= Gaby Music =

Puerto Rican record producer

- Born: Juan Gabriel Rivera Vázquez; November 26, 1989 (age 36); San Juan, Puerto Rico
- Genres: Reggaeton; Latin trap
- Occupations: Record producer; Songwriter
- Years active: 2013–present
- Labels: Universal Latino; La Familia

Juan Gabriel Rivera Vázquez (born November 26, 1989), known professionally as Gaby Music, is a Puerto Rican record producer and songwriter. He is recognized for working with artists such as Wisin & Yandel, Daddy Yankee, Don Omar, Bad Bunny, Ozuna, Anuel AA among others. He has won Billboard Latin Music Awards for songwriter of the year in 2019.

== Early life ==
Juan Gabriel Rivera Vázquez was born on November 26, 1989, in the city of San Juan, Puerto Rico. As a teenager, he met Chris Jedi. In 2013, they began working with Puerto Rican duo Wisin & Yandel as songwriters.

== Career ==
In 2016, Gaby Music worked on the composition of Chris Jedi's first single titled "Dale Hasta Abajo" featuring singer-songwriter Joey Montana. The following year, he was marked as a songwriter for Jedi's song "Ahora Dice" with the participation of J Balvin, Ozuna and Arcángel. He has worked as a producer on songs such as Daddy Yankee's "La Rompe Corazones" with Ozuna, Súbeme la Radio by Enrique Iglesias, "Vaina Loca" by Ozuna and Manuel Turizo, among others. In 2018, Gaby Music produced J Balvin's song "Peligrosa" featuring Wisin & Yandel, part from his studio album "Vibras". He produced alongside Chris Jedi every song on Anuel AA's debut studio album Real Hasta la Muerte.

On February 21, 2019, Gaby Music released his single as an artist "Soltera" with Lunay and Jedi, part from Lunay's debut studio album Épico. In 2020, he worked on songs from Anuel AA's second studio album Emmanuel including Reggaetonera, Hasta Que Dios Diga and Narcos. Gaby Music also was marked as producer and songwriter for Bad Bunny's albums YHLQMDLG, Las que no iban a salir and El Último Tour Del Mundo.

In 2021, Gaby Music and Chris Jedi launched La Familia Records. The first project released by the company was Lunay's second studio album El Ñino. The label is also affiliated with Puerto Rican rappers Bryant Myers, Juliito and Chanell. Meanwhile, Gaby Music worked on several albums including Anuel AA's Las Leyendas Nunca Mueren (2021) and LLNM2 and Rosalía's Motomami + (2022). In 2023, he produced the songs "Seda" and "Gracias por Nada" by Bad Bunny.

On December 15, 2023, Gaby Music released his single "No Te Quieren Conmigo" with the participation of Lunay and Luar la L. In February, 2024, along with Chris Jedi and Dei V, he released his debut extended play titled Los Marcianos, Vol.1: Dei V Version. On April 4, 2024, a remix version of "No Te Quieren Conmigo" was released with Anuel AA and Bryant Myers.

== Credits ==
=== Albums ===
- The Last Don 2 (2015), Don Omar - producer, songwriter
- Odisea (2017), Ozuna - producer, songwriter
- Vibras (2018), J Balvin - producer, songwriter
- Real Hasta la Muerte(2018), Anuel AA - producer, songwriter
- Aura (2018), Ozuna - producer, songwriter
- Ocean (2019), Karol G - producer, songwriter
- Épico (2019), Lunay - producer, songwriter
- YHLQMDLG (2020), Bad Bunny - producer, songwriter
- Las que no iban a salir (2020), Bad Bunny - producer, songwriter
- Emmanuel (2020), Anuel AA - producer, songwriter
- El Último Tour Del Mundo (2020), Bad Bunny - producer, songwriter
- Las Leyendas Nunca Mueren (2021), Anuel AA - producer, songwriter
- Motomami + (2022), Despechá - producer, songwriter
- LLNM2 (2022), Anuel AA - producer, songwriter
- Nadie Sabe Lo Que Va a Pasar Mañana (2020), Bad Bunny - producer, songwriter
- Cosmo (2023), Ozuna - producer, songwriter

=== Songs ===
- "Sígueme y Te Sigo" (2015), Daddy Yankee - producer
- "La Rompe Corazones" (2017), Daddy Yankee featuring Ozuna - producer
- "Súbeme la Radio" (2017), Enrique Iglesias featuring Descemer Bueno and Zion & Lennox - producer, songwriter
- "El Farsante" (2017), Ozuna - producer, songwriter
- "Se Preparó" (2017), Ozuna - producer, songwriter
- "La Modelo" (2017), Ozuna featuring Cardi B - producer, songwriter
- "Brindemos" (2018), Anuel AA featuring Ozuna - producer, songwriter
- "Quiere Beber" (2018), Anuel AA - producer, songwriter
- "Yeezy" (2018), Anuel AA featuring Ñengo Flow - producer, songwriter
- "Vaina Loca" (2018), Ozuna and Manuel Turizo - producer, songwriter
- "Culpables" (2018), Karol G and Anuel AA - producer, songwriter
- "Adictiva" (2018), Daddy Yankee and Anuel AA - producer, songwriter
- "Aullando" (2019), Wisin & Yandel and Romeo Santos - producer, songwriter
- "Te Robaré" (2019), Nicky Jam and Ozuna - producer, songwriter
- "Soltera (remix)" (2019), Lunay, Daddy Yankee and Bad Bunny - producer, songwriter
- "Aventura" (2019), Lunay, Ozuna and Anuel AA - producer, songwriter
- "Keii" (2020), Anuel AA - producer, songwriter
- "Hasta Que Dios Diga" (2020), Anuel AA and Bad Bunny - producer, songwriter
- "Narcos" (2020), Anuel AA - producer, songwriter
- "La Noche de Anoche" (2020), Bad Bunny and Rosalía - producer, songwriter
- "La Llevo al Cielo" (2022), Chris Jedi, Chencho Corleone and Anuel AA featuring Ñengo Flow - producer, songwriter
- "Despecha" (2022), Rosalía - producer, songwriter
- "Seda" (2023), Bad Bunny and Bryant Myers - producer, songwriter
- "Gracias por Nada" (2023), Bad Bunny - producer, songwriter
- "Baccarat" (2023), Ozuna - producer, songwriter

== Discography ==
=== Extended plays ===
List of extended plays, with selected chart positions
Title	Album details	Peak chart positions	
Title	Album details	US Latin	SPA
Los Marcianos Vol. 1: Dei V Version (with Chris Jedi and Dei V)	Released: February 9, 2024; Labels: La Familia, Universal Latino; Format: Digital download, streaming	41	15

=== Singles ===
==== As lead artist ====
List of singles as lead artist, with selected chart positions
Title	Year	Peak chart positions		Certifications	Album
Title	Year	US Latin	SPA	Certifications	Album
"Soltera" (with Lunay and Chris Jedi)	2019	—	3	FIMI: Gold; PROMUSICAE: Platinum	Épico
"Duro" (with Chris Jedi and Anuel AA featuring Jenny "La Sexy Voz")	2022	21	74	PROMUSICAE: Gold	Non-album singles
"No Te Quieren Conmigo" (with Lunay and Luar la L or remix with Anuel AA featuring Bryant Myers)	2023	36	4	PROMUSICAE: 2× Platinum	Non-album singles
"Bad Boy" (with Chris Jedi and Dei V featuring Anuel AA and Ozuna)	2024	46	19	PROMUSICAE: Gold	Los Marcianos, Vol.1: Dei V Version
"—" denotes a title that was not released or did not chart in that territory.

=== Other charted songs ===
List of other charted songs, with selected chart positions, showing year released and album name
Title	Year	Peak chart positions	Certifications	Album
Title	Year	SPA	Certifications	Album
"Perreo Lento" (with Chris Jedi and Dei V)	2024	35	PROMUSICAE: Platinum	Los Marcianos, Vol.1: Dei V Version
