= Bad Boy (Chris Jedi, Gaby Music and Dei V song) =

2023 single by Chris Jedi, Gaby Music and Dei V

Single by Chris Jedi, Gaby Music and Dei V featuring Anuel AA and Ozuna

from the EP Los Marcianos Vol. 1: Dei V Version
- Released: February 8, 2024
- Genre: Reggaeton
- Length: 3:56
- Label: La Familia; Under Water Music
- Songwriters: Carlos Ortiz; Juan Gabriel Rivera; David Rivera; Emmanuel Gazmey; Juan Carlos Ozuna
- Producers: Chris Jedi; Gaby Music

Chris Jedi singles chronology
"Los Que Son" (2023)	"Bad Boy" (2024)	"Me Va Kbrxxn" (2024)

Gaby Music singles chronology
"No Te Quieren Conmigo" (2023)	"Bad Boy" (2024)	"Me Va Kbrxxn" (2024)

Dei V singles chronology
"Diabolica" (2023)	"Bad Boy" (2024)	"Me Va Kbrxxn" (2024)

Anuel AA singles chronology
"Luces Tenues" (2023)	"Bad Boy" (2024)	"Tacos Gucci" (2024)

Ozuna singles chronology
"Carrussel" (2023)	"Bad Boy" (2024)	"Lollipop (remix)" (2024)

Music video
- "Bad Boy" on YouTube

"Bad Boy" is a song by Puerto Rican producers Chris Jedi and Gaby Music and Puerto Rican rapper Dei V featuring Puerto Rican rapper Anuel AA and Puerto Rican-Dominican singer Ozuna. It was released on February 8, 2024, through La Familia and Under Water Music as the lead single from Chris Jedi, Gaby Music and Dei V's extended play "Los Marcianos, Vol.1: Dei V Version".

== Background ==
In January, 2024, Chris Jedi and Gaby Music claimed that Dei V will collaborate with Anuel AA and Ozuna in a song titled "Bad Boy". In February 2024, the producers announced their debut extended play with the participation of Dei V, Los Marcianos, Vol.1: Dei V Version, and the song was included as the second track.

== Composition ==
In the song, Anuel AA used a similar to his verse from his unreleased song with J Balvin "No Te Olvido".

== Commercial performance ==
"Bad Boy" charted at number 46 on the US Hot Latin Songs chart upon the issue date of October 28, 2023. The song debuted and peaked at number 19 in Spain's official chart.

== Music video ==
The music video was uploaded to YouTube on Gaby Music's YouTube channel on February 8, 2023, with the release of Los Marcianos, Vol.1: Dei V Version.

== Charts ==
Chart performance for "Bad Boy"
Chart (2024)	Peak position
Spain (PROMUSICAE)	19
US Hot Latin Songs (Billboard)	46

== Certifications ==
Certifications for "Bad Boy"
Region	Certification	Certified units/sales
Spain (Promusicae)	Gold	30,000^{‡}
^{‡} Sales+streaming figures based on certification alone.
