= Los Marcianos Vol. 1: Dei V Version =

Los Marcianos, Vol. 1: Dei V Version

EP by Chris Jedi, Gaby Music and Dei V
- Released: February 9, 2024
- Recorded: 2023–2024
- Genre: Latin trap
- Length: 15:00
- Language: Spanish
- Label: La Familia; Under Water; Encore; Universal Latino
- Producer: Chris Jedi; Gaby Music

Singles from Los Marcianos, Vol. 1: Dei V Version
- 1. "Bad Boy" Released: February 9, 2024; 2. "Me Va Kabrxxn" Released: March 22, 2024

Los Marcianos, Vol. 1: Dei V Version is a collaborative EP by Puerto Rican producers and songwriters Chris Jedi and Gaby Music and Puerto Rican rapper Dei V. It was released on February 9, 2024, through La Famila Records, Under Water Music, Encore Recordings and Universal Music Latino. It was produced by Chris Jedi and Gaby Music and has collaborations with Anuel AA, Ozuna and Kendo Kaponi. The EP includes five songs, of which two are the singles "Bad Boy" and "Me Va Kabrxxn".

== Track listing ==
Los Marcianos, Vol.1: Dei V Version track listing
No.	Title	Length
1.	"Me Va Kabrxxn" (featuring Kendo Kaponi)	4:16
2.	"Bad Boy" (featuring Anuel AA and Ozuna)	3:55
3.	"Perreo Lento"	2:36
4.	"$Dollar$"	2:23
5.	"Barbie"	2:32
Total length:		15:00

== Charts ==
Chart performance for Los Marcianos, Vol.1: Dei V Version
Chart (2024)	Peak position
Spanish Albums (PROMUSICAE)	15
US Heatseekers Albums (Billboard)	14
US Top Latin Albums (Billboard)	41
US Latin Rhythm Albums (Billboard)	20
