= Gracias por Nada =

2023 song by Bad Bunny

Song by Bad Bunny

from the album Nadie Sabe Lo Que Va a Pasar Mañana
- Language: Spanish
- Released: October 13, 2023
- Genre: Latin trap
- Length: 2:57
- Label: Rimas
- Songwriters: Benito Martínez; Bryan Rohena; Carlos Ortiz; Juan Rivera
- Producers: Chris Jedi; Gaby Music; Mag; La Paciencia

Visualizer
- "Gracias por Nada" on YouTube

"Gracias por Nada" is a song by Puerto Rican rapper Bad Bunny. It was released on October 13, 2023, through Rimas Entertainment, as part of Bad Bunny's fifth studio album, Nadie Sabe Lo Que Va a Pasar Mañana. The song was written by Bad Bunny and Bryant Myers with Chris Jedi, Gaby Music, La Paciencia and Mag handling the production, who were also marked as songwriters.

== Background and release ==
On October 9, 2023, Bad Bunny announced his album Nadie Sabe Lo Que Va a Pasar Mañana, and "Gracias por Nada" was included as the album's ninth track.

== Commercial performance ==
Following the releasing of Nadie Sabe Lo Que Va a Pasar Mañana, "Gracias por Nada" appeared at number 52 on the US Billboard Hot 100 chart upon the issue date of October 28, 2023. The song also charted at number 28 on the US Hot Latin Songs chart upon the issue date of October 28, 2023. On the Billboard Global 200 chart, it debuted at number 18 on the chart dated October 28, 2023. "Gracias por Nada" peaked at number 21 in Spain's official chart. It appeared also in the Billboard charts in Chile (24), Colombia (20), Ecuador (17) and Peru (24).

== Critical reception ==
Billboard ranked "Gracias por Nada" at number 17 on their list of songs from Nadie Sabe Lo Que Va a Pasar Mañana describing it as "one of the album's most sentimental songs".

== Audio visualizer ==
The audio visualizer was uploaded to YouTube on Bad Bunny's channel on October 13, 2023, along with the other audio visualizer videos that premiered simultaneously with the release of Nadie Sabe Lo Que Va a Pasar Mañana.

== Charts ==
Chart performance for "Gracias por Nada"
Chart (2023)	Peak position
Chile (Billboard)	24
Colombia (Billboard)	20
Ecuador (Billboard)	17
Global 200 (Billboard)	28
Peru (Billboard)	24
Spain (PROMUSICAE)	21
US Billboard Hot 100	52
US Hot Latin Songs (Billboard)	13

== Certifications ==
Certifications for "Gracias por Nada"
Region	Certification	Certified units/sales
Spain (Promusicae)	Gold	50,000^{‡}
^{‡} Sales+streaming figures based on certification alone.
