= Yeezy (song) =

Song by Anuel AA featuring Ñengo Flow

from the album Real Hasta la Muerte
- Language: Spanish
- Released: July 17, 2018
- Studio: The Hit Factory
- Genre: Latin trap
- Length: 4:21
- Label: Real Hasta la Muerte
- Songwriters: Emmanuel Gazmey Santiago; Edwin Rosa Vázquez Ortiz; Carlos Enrique Ortiz Rivera; Juan Gabriel Rivera
- Producers: Mando Fresh; Chris Jedi; Gaby Music

Music video
- "Yeezy" on YouTube

"Yeezy" is a song by Puerto Rican rapper Anuel AA featuring Puerto Rican rapper Ñengo Flow. The song was released as a track on the former's debut studio album Real Hasta la Muerte on July 17, 2018, through Real Hasta la Muerte. A music video was released on August 28, 2018. Anuel AA and Ñengo Flow wrote the song alongside producers Chris Jedi, Gaby Music and Mando Fresh.

== Background and release ==
"Yeezy" was inspired by the fashion collaboration Yeezy between American rapper Kanye West and German sportswear company Adidas. Anuel AA and Ñengo Flow have had many previous collaborations, including "47", "Los Intocables" and "Jersey".

On July 17, 2018, Anuel AA's debut studio album Real Hasta la Muerte was available in all music platforms at the moment he was released from prison. "Yeezy" was included as the eleventh track with an audio visualizer uploaded to YouTube along with the other song visualizers that appeared on the album and got 35 million views.

== Music video ==
The music video for "Yeezy" was released on August 28, 2018, in Anuel AA's YouTube channel and was produced by Fernando Lugo and Luis Santana. It reached more than 235 million views.

== Charts ==
Chart performance for "Yeezy"
Chart (2018)	Peak position
US Hot Latin Songs (Billboard)	45

== Certifications ==
Certifications and sales for "Yeezy"
Region	Certification	Certified units/sales
Spain (PROMUSICAE)	Platinum	60,000^{‡}
United States (RIAA)	3× Platinum (Latin)	180,000^{‡}
^{‡} Sales+streaming figures based on certification alone.
