= El Manual =

Song by Anuel AA

from the album Emmanuel
- Language: Spanish
- English title: "The Manual"
- Released: May 29, 2020
- Genre: Reggaeton
- Length: 3:30
- Label: Real Hasta la Muerte
- Songwriter: Emmanuel Gazmey Santiago
- Producer: Ovy On The Drums

Visualizer
- "El Manual" on YouTube

"El Manual" (English: The Manual) is a song by Puerto Rican rapper Anuel AA. It was released through Real Hasta la Muerte as the tenth track from his second studio album, Emmanuel, on May 29, 2020.

== Background ==
On May 27, 2021, Anuel AA announced his second studio album Emmanuel, and "El Manual" was included as the tenth track.

== Live performance ==
Anuel AA performed "El Manual" at the 21st Annual Latin Grammy Awards on November 19, 2020, at American Airlines Arena in Miami, Florida.

== Composition ==
The song is written by Anuel AA and Ovy On The Drums and produced by the latter. It is about a girl who has all the right characteristics to win a man's heart. Billboard describes the song as an "upbeat track that kicks off with a captivating electric guitar melody meshed with flares of Brazilian funk exploding into an urban-tinged Calypso beat".

== Commercial performance ==
"El Manual" debuted at number 31 on the Hot Latin Songs chart dated February 6, 2024. In Spain, it debuted at number 23 on the chart dated May 29, 2020. On its fourth week on the chart dated June 19, 2020, the song reached a peak of number one. It was later given a 3× Platinum certification from PROMUSICAE.

== Audio visualizer ==
The song got released on May 29, 2020, with an audio visualizer uploaded to YouTube along with the other song visualizers that appeared on Emmanuel, and got more than 60 million views.

== Charts ==
Chart performance for "El Manual"
Chart (2020)	Peak position
Spain (PROMUSICAE)	1
US Hot Latin Songs (Billboard)	38

== Certifications ==
Certifications and sales for "El Manual"
Region	Certification	Certified units/sales
Spain (Promusicae)	3× Platinum	120,000^{‡}
^{‡} Sales+streaming figures based on certification alone.
