= Secreto (song) =

2019 single by Anuel AA and Karol G

Single by Anuel AA and Karol G

from the album Emmanuel
- Language: Spanish
- English title: "Secret"
- Released: January 15, 2019
- Genre: Pop; reggaeton
- Length: 4:18
- Label: Real Hasta la Muerte; Universal Latino
- Producers: Ezequiel Rivera; Henry de la Prida

Anuel AA singles chronology
| "Amanece" (2018) | "Secreto" (2019) | "Controla" (2019) |

Karol G singles chronology
| "Créeme" (2018) | "Secreto" (2019) | "Peligrosa" (2019) |

Music video
- "Secreto" on YouTube

"Secreto" (Secret in English) is a song by Puerto Rican rapper Anuel AA and Colombian singer Karol G. It was released on January 15, 2019, by Real Hasta la Muerte and Universal Music Latino. It reached number one on the Spanish charts, staying there for three weeks, as well as the top 40 in Italy, and number 68 on the US Billboard Hot 100. It was later given a 4× Platinum Latin certification from the RIAA.

== Background ==
The song, called a "pop-reggaeton duet about a torrid but hidden romance", was considered to be about Anuel AA and Karol G's prior rumored but unconfirmed relationship. The track leaked in December 2018, which the producers feared would hinder the song's success and demotivate the singers to promote it, but the song was successful regardless. Billboard described its lyrics as about the couple's "steamy love life in bed".

== Music video ==
The music video was also released on YouTube in January 2019, and features romantic scenes of Anuel AA and Karol G. Rolling Stone called it an "entire rom-com's worth of PDA". It achieved close to 100 million views in 10 days, and as of April 2020 has received over 1.0 billion views. The flower arrangements that Anuel AA had made for Karol G also appear in the music video. The arrangements were made by florist Erika Mejía.

== Charts ==
=== Weekly charts ===
| Chart (2019) | Peak position |
|---|---|
| Argentina (Argentina Hot 100) | 3 |
| Bolivia (Monitor Latino) | 1 |
| Colombia (Monitor Latino) | 8 |
| Colombia (National-Report) | 5 |
| Dominican Republic (Monitor Latino) | 13 |
| Ecuador (Monitor Latino) | 6 |
| Honduras (Monitor Latino) | 3 |
| Nicaragua (Monitor Latino) | 1 |
| Italy (FIMI) | 34 |
| Paraguay (Monitor Latino) | 5 |
| Peru (Monitor Latino) | 2 |
| Portugal (AFP) | 68 |
| Puerto Rico (Monitor Latino) | 1 |
| Spain (Promusicae) | 1 |
| Switzerland (Schweizer Hitparade) | 65 |
| US Billboard Hot 100 | 68 |
| US Hot Latin Songs (Billboard) | 5 |
| US Latin Airplay (Billboard) | 1 |
| US Latin Pop Airplay (Billboard) | 1 |
| US Latin Rhythm Airplay (Billboard) | 1 |
| Venezuela (Monitor Latino) | 12 |

=== Year-end charts ===
| Chart (2019) | Position |
|---|---|
| Argentina Airplay (Monitor Latino) | 34 |
| El Salvador (Monitor Latino) | 8 |
| Spain (PROMUSICAE) | 10 |

== Certifications ==
| Region | Certification | Certified units/sales |
|---|---|---|
| Brazil (Pro-Música Brasil) | Platinum | 40,000^{‡} |
| Italy (FIMI) | Platinum | 50,000^{‡} |
| Portugal (AFP) | Gold | 5,000^{‡} |
| Spain (Promusicae) | 4× Platinum | 240,000^{‡} |
| United States (RIAA) | Diamond (Latin) | 600,000^{‡} |
^{‡} Sales+streaming figures based on certification alone.

== See also ==
- List of Billboard Argentina Hot 100 top-ten singles in 2019
- List of Billboard Hot Latin Songs and Latin Airplay number ones of 2019
