= Peligrosa (disambiguation) =

Peligrosa is a Venezuelan TV series.

Peligrosa may also refer to:

- "Peligrosa" (FloyyMenor song), 2024
- "Peligrosa" (Lartiste and Karol G song), 2018
- "Peligrosa" a song by J Balvin from the album Vibras, 2018
