= Dei V =

Puerto Rican rapper (born 1995)

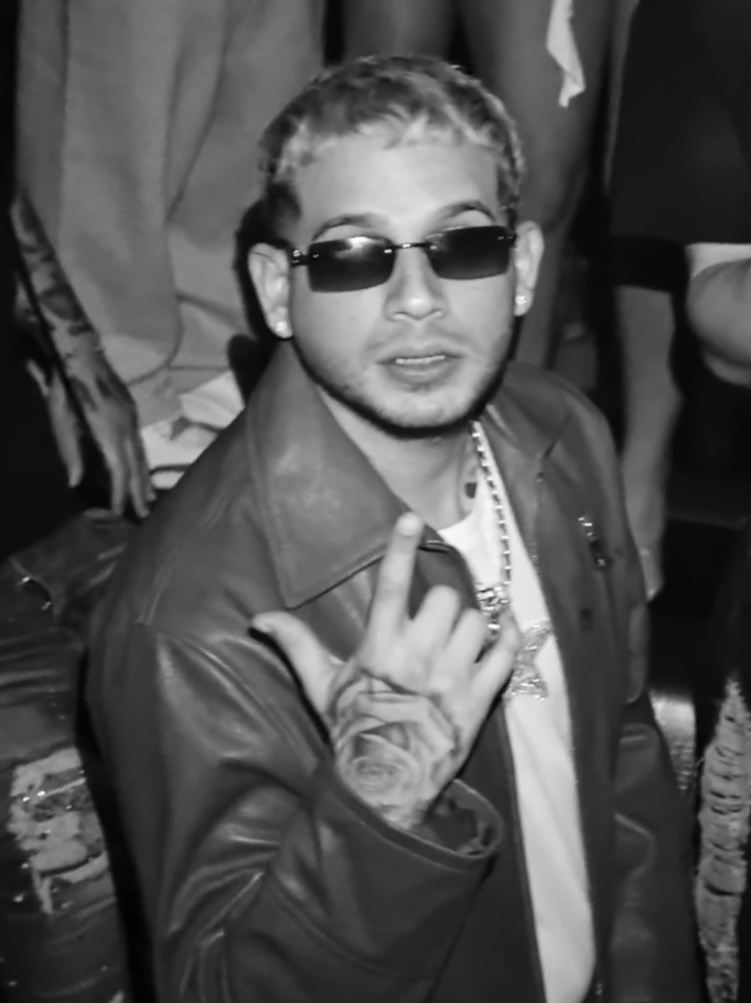
- Dei V in the music video "Drippeo Kbron" (2024)

Background information
- Born: David Gerardo Rivera Juarbe; December 26, 1995 (age 30); Carolina, Puerto Rico
- Genres: Latin trap; reggaeton
- Occupations: Rapper; singer; songwriter
- Instrument: Vocals
- Years active: 2020–present
- Labels: Under Water; Encore

David Gerardo Rivera Juarbe (born December 26, 1995), known professionally as Dei V, is a Puerto Rican rapper, singer and songwriter. Dei V's recording debut was in 2021 with his EP Yin Yang. Two years later, he made his international breakthrough with "¿Quién es Dei V?". In that year he was nominated for the Premio Tu Música Urbano in the Top Artist — Trap category. Also that year, he collaborated with artists such as Luar la L, Anuel AA, Karol G, Cris MJ, and Ozuna, among others.

In 2024, Dei V released his second EP entitled Los Marcianos Vol.1: Dei V Version with producers Chris Jedi and Gaby Music. In the middle of that year he released his debut studio album ¿Quién es Dei V?.

== Musical career ==
Dei V began his musical career in 2020, with the help of the record label Moneywayy and FERRORECORDS, led at that time by the artists Yeruza, KingKeni and Yovngchimi, his first single was his version of "Llegara", a song by Myke Towers. In 2021 he released his first extended play, Ying Yang; however, some time later he deleted the songs from Spotify to leave them only on YouTube, the project had 11 singles and video clips. "Quieren ser yo" released in 2022, was one of his first songs with a viral reach.

In March 2023, Dei V released the audiovisual of his debut single "Quién es Dei V?", it obtained more than 25 million views on YouTube in one year. In May of that year he released "Trending Remix" in collaboration with Myke Towers. In July he participated in Pacto (Remix), in collaboration with Jay Wheeler, Anuel AA, Bryant Myers, and Hades66. On August 9, Dei V released "Single", a single where the artist talks about forbidden love, the song shows a change in style in the artist, similar to his single "Trending". In that month he also participated in the song "Gatita Gangster", a single from Karol G's fourth studio album Mañana Será Bonito. Dei V later participated in the song "Diamonds", a single from the Mora's studio album Estrella. In September, he released the audiovisual of the single "Narcotics" in collaboration with Bryant Myers, obtaining more 30 million views on YouTube. In October, he released the single "Crush" in collaboration with Sky Rompiendo and Arcángel.

On February 13, 2024, Dei V released his second EP, entitled Los Marcianos Vol 1. Dei V Version, in collaboration with producers Chris Jedi and Gaby Music, consisting of four singles and a collaboration with Kendo Kaponi in the single "Me Va Kabrxxn ". The promotional single for the EP was "Bad Boy" with Anuel AA and Ozuna. On April 25, 2024, he released the single "Martini". In June 2024, he participated in the song Badgyal with Saiko and JC Reyes from Saiko's debut studio album "Sakura", which peaked at number one in Spain.

On January 5, 2025, he participated in the song "Veldá" with fellow Puerto Rican artists Bad Bunny and Omar Courtz. This marked his first entry on the Billboard Hot 100, debuting at #43 and eventually having a peak of number 23 on the chart.

On March 27, 2025, he released the EP Los Flavorz with artists such as Omar Courtz, De La Rose & Clarent participating on different songs.

On October 10, 2025, he released his album Underwater, featuring artists like Blessd, Luar la L, Arcángel, Ñengo Flow, Yandel and more.

== Musical style ==
The genre that Dei V has covered since he began his musical career is Latin trap with a relaxed style accompanied by a slow tempo, synthesizers and lyrics that talk about greed, the street, luxury cars, money and women. This type of style is shown in the artist's singles such as "Quién es Dei V?", "Single", "Trending", and "Right Thru", among others.

== Discography ==
=== Albums ===
List of albums, with selected chart positions
Title	Album details	Peak chart positions
Title	Album details	SPA
Quién es Dei V?	Released: June 14, 2024; Labels: Under Water Music; Format: Digital download, streaming	1
Underwater	Released: October 10, 2025; Labels: Under Water Music; Format: Digital download, streaming	93

=== Extended plays ===
List of extended plays, with selected chart positions
Title	Album details	Peak chart positions	
Title	Album details	US Latin	SPA
Yin Yang	Released: October 8, 2021; Labels: Drip 369 Media Group, Inc.; Format: Digital download, streaming	—	—
Los Marcianos Vol. 1: Dei V Version (with Chris Jedi and Gaby Music)	Released: February 9, 2024; Labels: La Familia, Universal Latino; Format: Digital download, streaming	41	15
Los Flavorz	Released: March 27, 2025; Labels: Under Water Music; Format: Digital download, streaming	40	76
"—" denotes a title that was not released or did not chart in that territory.

=== Singles ===
==== As lead artist ====
List of singles as lead artist, with selected chart positions
Title	Year	Peak chart positions		Certifications	Album
Title	Year	US Latin	SPA	Certifications	Album
"VVS"	2022	—	—	PROMUSICAE: Gold	Non-album singles
"Dame Lu (remix)" (with Brray and Dalex featuring Omar Courtz, Ñengo Flow and Yovngchimi)	2022	—	—		Non-album singles
"Trending" (or remix featuring Myke Towers)	2023	—	14	PROMUSICAE: Platinum (Remix)	Quién es Dei V?
"Single"	2023	—	—	PROMUSICAE: Gold	Quién es Dei V?
"Quién es Dei V?"	2023	—	15	PROMUSICAE: 2× Platinum	Quién es Dei V?
"Pacto" (with Jay Wheeler and Hades66 featuring Luar la L)	2023	—	42	PROMUSICAE: Gold	Emociones 1.5
"Narcotics" (with Bryant Myers)	2023	—	29	PROMUSICAE: 2× Platinum	Quién es Dei V?
"Tu$$i" (with Yovngchimi)	2023	—	22	RIAA: Platinum (Latin); PROMUSICAE: Platinum	WLGS
"Crush" (with Sky Rompiendo)	2023	—	30	PROMUSICAE: Platinum	Non-album single
"Diabolica" (with Cris MJ)	2023	—	21	PROMUSICAE: Platinum	Partyson
"Bad Boy" (with Chris Jedi and Gaby Music featuring Anuel AA and Ozuna)	2024	46	19	PROMUSICAE: Gold	Los Marcianos, Vol.1: Dei V Version
"Martini"	2024	—	17	PROMUSICAE: Platinum	Quién es Dei V?
"Clima" (with Foreign Teck)	2024	—	73		Quién es Dei V?
"Quickie"	2024	—	60		
"Trajecito" (with J Castle)	2024	—			
"Sirena"	2025	—	53		
"Oh, Baby!" (with Omar Montes and Ovy on the Drums)	2025	—	90		
"Amber" (with Omar Courtz)	2025	—	44		Los Flavorz
"Lolly" (with Clarent)	2025	—	60		Los Flavorz
"Toa" (with De La Rose)	2025	—	21		Los Flavorz
"La Presidencial" (with Mora)	2025	—	51		Lo Mismo De Siempre
"Balconcito" (with Blessd, Brytiago and Noriel)	2025	—	—		Trinidad Bendita
"Replay" (with Yandel)	2025	—	—		Square Houze Vol. 1
"Banda" (with Morad)	2025	—	45		
"Tumbao"	2025	—	—		
"Undercromo (W Sound 06)" (with W Sound and Ovy on the Drums)	2025	—	65		
"Duro Ma" (with Bryant Myers and Saiko)	2025	—	28		Millo Gangster Club
"Muñeca De Urba" (with Kris R)	2025	—	—		
"Modales" (with Kidd Voodoo)	2025	—	—		
"El Del Flavor"	2025	—	—		
"Whatever For You (Remix)" (with NTG, Bay Area and A Boogie Wit Da Hoodie)	2025	—	—		
"BB" (with Blessd)	2025	—	—		
"Dejala Caer" (with Ñengo Flow)	2025	—	—		
"Problema" (with Luar La L)	2025	—	28		
"QNP" (with Arcángel)	2025	—	—		
"Wo Oh" (with Yandel)	2025	—	—		
"La Favorita De Dios" (with ROA)	2025	—	—		
"Mi Droga" (with Luar La L)	2025	—	—		
"Polos Opuestos" (with Midnvght and Clarent)	2025	—	—		
"Volvió en Perreo" (with DJ Luian)	2026	—	—		
"$uelta Gatita $uelta" (with Omar Courtz and Clarent)	2026	—	—		
"NYX00" (with JC Reyes)	2026	—	—		
"—" denotes a title that was not released or did not chart in that territory.

==== As featured artist ====
List of singles as featured artist, with selected chart positions
Title	Year	Peak chart positions		Certifications	Album
Title	Year	US Latin	SPA	Certifications	Album
"Jetski (remix)" (ROA, Bryant Myers and Omar Courtz featuring Dei V)	2022	—	—	RIAA: Platinum (Latin)	Non-album single
"Pacto (remix)" (Jay Wheeler, Anuel AA and Hades66 featuring Bryant Myers and Dei V)	2023	29	29	PROMUSICAE: Platinum	TraPPii
"Si Si Si Si" (Dímelo Flow, Sech, Dalex, Justin Quiles and Lenny Tavárez featuring Eladio Carrión, Bryant Myers and Dei V)	2024	—	10	* PROMUSICAE: Gold	The Academy: Segunda Misión
"—" denotes a title that was not released or did not chart in that territory.

=== Other charted songs ===
List of other charted songs, with selected chart positions, showing year released and album name
Title	Year	Peak chart positions		Certifications	Album
Title	Year	US Latin	SPA	Certifications	Album
"Gatita Gangster" (with Karol G)	2023	29	39	PROMUSICAE: Platinum	Mañana Será Bonito (Bichota Season)
"Diamonds" (with Mora)	2023	—	74	PROMUSICAE: Gold	Estrella
"Perreo Lento" (with Chris Jedi and Gaby Music)	2024	—	35	PROMUSICAE: Platinum	Los Marcianos Vol.1: Dei V Version
"Badgyal" (with Saiko and JC Reyes)	2024	—	1	PROMUSICAE: 3× Platinum	Sakura
"Rapido" (with Cris MJ)	2024	—	11	PROMUSICAE: Platinum	Quién es Dei V?
"58" (with Jhayco)	2024	—	38		Le Clique: Vida Rockstar (X)
"Flipa" (with JC Reyes)	2025	—	2		Nacer de Nuevo
"TOA" (with De La Rose)	2025	—	21		Los Flavorz
"—" denotes a title that was not released or did not chart in that territory.
