= Que Se Joda =

Song by Anuel AA, Farruko and Zion

from the album Emmanuel
- Language: Spanish
- English title: "Fuck it"
- Released: May 29, 2020
- Genre: Reggaeton
- Length: 3:37
- Label: Real Hasta la Muerte
- Producer(s): Chris Jeday; Gaby Music; Frabian Eli; Dulce Como Candy; Dimelo Nino; Alex Killer

Music video
- "Que Se Joda" on YouTube

"Que Se Joda" (transl. "Fuck It") is a song by Puerto Rican rapper Anuel AA and Puerto Rican singers Farruko and Zion. It was released on May 29, 2020 as track on Anuel AA's second studio album Emmanuel. A music video was released on June 11, 2020.

== Music video ==
The video was released on June 11, 2020, and has so far received over 162 million views on YouTube. The visual is an explosion of summer fun including jet skis, off-road driving, a luxury yacht cruise and an afternoon at a water park.

== Charts ==
| Chart (2020) | Peak position |
|---|---|
| Spain (PROMUSICAE) | 41 |
| US Hot Latin Songs (Billboard) | 32 |
