= La Llevo al Cielo =

2022 single by Chris Jedi, Chencho Corleone, Anuel AA and Ñengo Flow

Single by Chris Jedi, Chencho Corleone, Anuel AA and Ñengo Flow
- Language: Spanish
- English title: "I Take Her To Heaven"
- Released: May 19, 2022
- Recorded: 2019–2021
- Genre: Reggaeton
- Length: 4:14
- Label: Universal Music Latino
- Songwriters: Carlos Enrique Ortiz Rivera; Orlando Javier Valle Vega; Emmanuel Gazmey Santiago; Edwin Rosa Vázquez; Juan Gabriel Rivera; Edgar Andino; Joel Hernández; Jorge Echevarria; Nino Karlo Segarra
- Producers: Chris Jedi; Gaby Music

Chris Jedi singles chronology
"Los de Siempre" (2021)	"La Llevo al Cielo" (2022)	"Condado" (2022)

Chencho Corleone singles chronology
"Desesperados" (2021)	"La Llevo al Cielo" (2022)	"Nos Comemos Vivos" (2022)

Anuel AA singles chronology
"Si Tú Me Busca'" (2022)	"La Llevo al Cielo" (2022)	"¿Qué Nos Pasó?" (2022)

Ñengo Flow singles chronology
"120MPH" (2022)	"La Llevo al Cielo" (2022)	"Jangueo" (2022)

Music video
- "La Llevo al Cielo" on YouTube

"La Llevo al Cielo" (transl. "I Take Her To Heaven") is a song by Puerto Rican producer Chris Jedi and Puerto Rican singers Chencho Corleone, Anuel AA and Ñengo Flow. It was released by Universal Music Latino on May 19, 2022, for digital download and streaming.

== Background ==
In 2019, Chencho Corleone posted a preview singing an acapella of a possible collaboration with Ñengo Flow. Later, a non-official edit of the song became viral on Youtube reaching nearly 200 million views. In 2022, Chris Jedi announced the song and the participation of Anuel AA in it: "A verse there that I had saved 2 years ago.", the latter wrote.

== Composition ==
In the song, Anuel AA mentioned Puerto Rican reggaeton duo Plan B and makes also reference to Ñengo Flow's verse in his song "Safaera" with Bad Bunny.

== Commercial performance ==
"La Llevo al Cielo" did not enter the Billboard Hot 100, but peaked at number 15 on the Bubbling Under Hot 100 chart. The song peaked at number 29 on the US Billboard Hot Latin Songs chart and at number 10 on the US Billboard Latin Digital Song Sales chart on June 4, 2022. It also debuted at number 100 on the Billboard Global 200 on the issue dated June 4, 2022. In Spain's official weekly chart, the song debuted and peaked at number nine on the PROMUSICAE chart dated May 27, 2022. "La Llevo al Cielo" reached the top of the chart in Dominican Republic and the fifth position in Honduras. In the artists' homecountry Puerto Rico, the song peaked at number two. It also appeared on the charts in Argentina (29), Chile (10), Colombia (21) and Peru (24).

== Music video ==
The music video for "La Llevo al Cielo" was released on May 19, 2022, at the same day the song came out, in Chris Jedi's YouTube channel and reached more than 300 million views. It was recorded in 2021 and produced by Fernando Lugo showing the artists dancing in different areas.

== Charts ==
Chart performance for "La Llevo al Cielo"
Chart (2022)	Peak position
Argentina Hot 100 (Billboard)	29
Chile (Billboard)	10
Colombia (Billboard)	21
Colombia (National-Report)	29
Dominican Republic (Monitor Latino)	1
Global 200 (Billboard)	100
Honduras (Monitor Latino)	5
Puerto Rico (Monitor Latino)	2
Peru (Billboard)	24
Spain (PROMUSICAE)	9
Spain (Billboard)	9
US Latin Rhythm Airplay (Billboard)	10
US Hot Latin Songs (Billboard)	29
US Latin Digital Song Sales (Billboard)	10

== Certifications ==
Certifications and sales for "La Llevo al Cielo"
Region	Certification	Certified units/sales
Spain (PROMUSICAE)	3× Platinum	180,000^{‡}
^{‡} Sales+streaming figures based on certification alone.
