= Reggaetonera =

Song by Anuel AA

from the album Emmanuel
- Language: Spanish
- Released: May 29, 2020
- Genre: Reggaeton
- Length: 3:32
- Label: Real Hasta la Muerte; Sony Latin
- Producer(s): Chris Jedi; Gaby Music

Music video
- "Reggaetonera" on YouTube

"Reggaetonera" is a song by Puerto Rican rapper and singer Anuel AA. It was released on May 29, 2020, through Real Hasta la Muerte and Sony Latin as a track on his second studio album Emmanuel. A Music video was released on June 19, 2020.

== Background ==
Previously, the song was previewed by Anuel AA multiple times in April, 2020. On May 27, 2021, Anuel AA announced his second studio album Emmanuel, and "Reggaetonera" was included as the third track.

== Commercial performance ==
"Reggaetonera" debuted and peaked at number 12 on the Billboard Hot Latin Songs dated June 13, 2020. The song also debuted and peaked at number 15 on Spain's official chart dated May 29, 2020.

== Music video ==
The video was released on June 19, 2020, and has so far received over 195 million views on YouTube. In the video Anuel shows the flags of the various Latin American countries.

== Controversy ==
A group of Bolivian rappers accused Anuel AA of showing the Bolivian flag in reverse in the video of the song. Anuel's answer was not long in coming: "Bolivia excuse me, I love you! It was a production error, we didn't realise! My last concert was in Bolivia, the love they showed me was legendary! Love and respect is what I have for you."

== Charts ==
=== Weekly charts ===
Chart (2020)	Peak position
Spain (PROMUSICAE)	15
US Hot Latin Songs (Billboard)	12
US Latin Digital Song Sales (Billboard)	25

=== Year-end charts ===
Chart (2020)	Position
US Hot Latin Songs (Billboard)	64

== Certifications ==
Region	Certification	Certified units/sales
Mexico (AMPROFON)	Gold	30,000^{‡}
Spain (PROMUSICAE)	Platinum	40,000^{‡}
^{‡} Sales+streaming figures based on certification alone.
