= Chris Jedi =

Puerto Rican record producer

- Born: Carlos Enrique Ortiz Rivera; September 19, 1989 (age 36); San Juan, Puerto Rico
- Genres: Reggaeton; Latin trap
- Occupation: Record producer
- Years active: 2010–present
- Labels: Universal Latino; La Familia

Carlos Enrique Ortiz Rivera (born September 19, 1989), known professionally as Chris Jedi or Chris Jeday, is a Puerto Rican record producer. He is recognized for working with artists such as Arcángel, Daddy Yankee, Don Omar, Wisin & Yandel, Ozuna, De la Ghetto, Anuel AA, Bad Bunny among others. He has won Billboard Latin Music Awards for producer of the year in 2019.

== Early life ==
Carlos Enrique Ortiz Rivera was born on September 19, 1989, in the city of San Juan, Puerto Rico. At age 15, he became a singer before becoming a producer. His first opportunities as a producer were thanks to Luny Tunes, whom he respects and admires.

== Career ==
Jedi has worked as a producer, songwriter and musical engineer alongside the producer and composer O'Neill for Zion & Lennox's "Si Fuera por Mí" on the album Los Verdaderos.

In 2012, he worked on the composition and production of 9 songs from the Wisin & Yandel album Líderes. One of the songs was "Algo Me Gusta de Ti".

Jedi released his first single in 2016, an electronic and reggaeton song titled "Dale Hasta Abajo" featuring singer-songwriter Joey Montana. The following year, he achieved recognition with the song "Ahora Dice", a song that featured the voices of J Balvin, Ozuna and Arcángel. "Ahora Dice" reached number seven on the Hot Latin Songs chart. The music video for the song has received more than 1 billion views on YouTube. The remix version included the participation of Cardi B.

He has worked as a producer on songs such as Daddy Yankee's "La Rompe Corazones" with Ozuna; "Caile" by Zion, De la Ghetto, Bryant Myers and Bad Bunny; "Vaivén" by Daddy Yankee, "La Fórmula" by De la Ghetto, Daddy Yankee, Ozuna, "Vaina Loca" by Ozuna and Manuel Turizo, among others.

In addition, he was the producer of all the songs on Anuel's album Real Hasta la Muerte along with Gaby Music and Frabián Elí. In collaboration with Gaby Music, he has supported the career of Lunay, who published his first studio album, Épico, months after his debut.

In March 2021, along with Gaby Music, Jedi launched La Familia Records. La Familia (meaning the Family) will be home to Lunay as well as newly signed Puerto Rican acts Chanell and Juliito, as well as producers Dímelo Ninow and Dulce como Candy.

== Awards ==
- 2019 - Billboard Latin Music Award as Producer of the Year
- Premio Juventud for Producer You Know By 'Shout-out'
- Tu Música Urbano
- ASCAP - Soltera (remix)

== Credits ==
=== Albums ===
- La Versatilidad de la Calle • Wolfine 2012 Producer - Chris Jedi
- The Last Don 2 • Don Omar 2015 Producer - Chris Jedi
- Odisea • Ozuna 2017 Producer - Chris Jedi
- Vibras • J Balvin 2018 Producer / Songwriter - Chris Jedi
- Real Hasta la Muerte • Anuel AA 2018 Producer - Chris Jedi
- Aura • Ozuna 2018 Producer - Chris Jedi
- Ocean • Karol G 2019 Producer - Chris Jedi
- Épico • Lunay 2019 Producer - Chris Jedi
- YHLQMDLG • Bad Bunny 2020 Producer - Chris Jedi
- Las que no iban a salir • Bad Bunny 2020 Producer - Chris Jedi
- Emmanuel • Anuel AA 2020 Producer - Chris Jedi
- El Último Tour Del Mundo • Bad Bunny 2020 Producer - Chris Jedi
- El Ñino • Lunay 2021 Producer - Chris Jedi
- Las Leyendas Nunca Mueren • Anuel AA 2021 Producer - Chris Jedi
- LLNM2 • Anuel AA 2022 Producer - Chris Jedi
- Nadie Sabe Lo Que Va a Pasar Mañana • Bad Bunny 2023 Producer - Chris Jedi
- Cosmo • Ozuna 2023 Producer - Chris Jedi

== Discography ==
=== Extended plays ===
List of extended plays, with selected chart positions
Title	Album details	Peak chart positions	
Title	Album details	US Latin	SPA
Los Marcianos Vol. 1: Dei V Version (with Gaby Music and Dei V)	Los Marcianos, Vol.1: Dei V Version: Released: February 9, 2024; Labels: La Familia, Universal Latino; Format: Digital download, streaming	41	15

=== Singles ===
==== As lead artist ====
List of singles as lead artist, with selected chart positions
Title	Year	Peak chart positions		Certifications	Album
Title	Year	US Latin	SPA	Certifications	Album
"Ahora Dice" (with J Balvin and Ozuna featuring Arcangel)	2017	—	7	RIAA: 2× Platinum (Latin); FIMI: Gold; PROMUSICAE: 4× Platinum	Non-album singles
"Ahora Dice" (remix) (with J Balvin and Ozuna featuring Cardi B, Offset, Anuel AA and Arcangel)	2017	7	—		Non-album singles
"Bipolar" (with Ozuna and Brytiago)	2018	17	37	RIAA: Platinum (Latin); PROMUSICAE: Platinum	Non-album singles
"Soltera" (with Lunay and Gaby Music)	2019	—	3	FIMI: Gold; PROMUSICAE: Platinum	Épico
"La Llevo al Cielo" (with Chencho Corleone and Anuel AA featuring Ñengo Flow)	2022	29	9	PROMUSICAE: 3× Platinum	Non-album singles
"Duro" (with Anuel AA and Gaby Music)	2022	21	74	PROMUSICAE: Gold	Non-album singles
"Bad Boy" (with Gaby Music and Dei V featuring Anuel AA and Ozuna)	2024	46	19	PROMUSICAE: Gold	Los Marcianos Vol.1: Dei V Version
"—" denotes a title that was not released or did not chart in that territory.

==== As featured artist ====
List of singles as featured artist, with selected chart positions
Title	Year	Peak chart positions	Certifications	Album
Title	Year	US Latin	Certifications	Album
"La Fórmula" (Daddy Yankee, De la Ghetto and Ozuna featuring Chris Jedi)	2017	23	PROMUSICAE: Gold	Mi Movimiento

=== Other charted songs ===
List of other charted songs, with selected chart positions, showing year released and album name
Title	Year	Peak chart positions		Certifications	Album
Title	Year	US Latin	SPA	Certifications	Album
"Vudú" (with Lunay and Chencho Corleone)	2021	—	75	PROMUSICAE: Gold	El Ñino
"Los de Siempre" (with Anuel AA)	2021	21	88		Non-album singles
"Pa Ti Estoy" (with Ozuna and Anuel AA)	2023	—	81	PROMUSICAE: Gold	Cosmo
"Perreo Lento" (with Gaby Music and Dei V)	2024	—	35	PROMUSICAE: Gold	Los Marcianos Vol.1: Dei V Version
"—" denotes a title that was not released or did not chart in that territory.

=== Appearances as producer ===
List of other songs as producer showing year released and album name
Title	Year	Performer(s)	Album
"Algo Me Gusta de Ti	2012	Wisin & Yandel, Chris Brown, T-Pain	Líderes
"Adrenalina	2014	Wisin, Ricky Martin, Jennifer Lopez	El Regreso del Sobreviviente
"Sígueme y Te Sigo	2015	Daddy Yankee	None
"Que Se Sienta el Deseo	2015	Wisin, Ricky Martin	Los Vaqueros: La Trilogía
"La Rompe Corazones	2017	Daddy Yankee, Ozuna	None
"Súbeme la Radio	2017	Enrique Iglesias, Descemer Bueno, Zion & Lennox	Final (Vol. 1)
"El Farsante" (or remix with Romeo Santos)	2017	Ozuna	Odisea
"Se Preparó"	2017	Ozuna	Odisea
"La Modelo"	2017	Ozuna, Cardi B	Aura
"Quiere Beber" (or remix with Romeo Santos)	2018	Anuel AA	Real Hasta la Muerte
"Brindemos"	2018	Anuel AA, Ozuna	Real Hasta la Muerte
"Vaina Loca"	2018	Ozuna, Manuel Turizo	Aura
"Culpables"	2018	Karol G, Anuel AA	Ocean
"Adictiva"	2018	Daddy Yankee, Anuel AA	None
"Aullando"	2019	Wisin & Yandel, Romeo Santos	Los Campeones del Pueblo
"Te Robaré"	2019	Nicky Jam, Ozuna	Íntimo
"Soltera (Remix)"	2019	Lunay, Daddy Yankee, Bad Bunny	Épico
"Aventura"	2019	Lunay, Ozuna, Anuel AA	Épico
"Keii"	2020	Anuel AA	None
"Hasta Que Dios Diga"	2020	Anuel AA, Bad Bunny	Emmanuel
"Que Se Joda"	2020	Anuel AA, Farruko, Zion	Emmanuel
"Reggaetonera"	2020	Anuel AA	Emmanuel
"Narcos"	2020	Anuel AA	Emmanuel
"La Noche de Anoche"	2020	Bad Bunny, Rosalía	El Último Tour Del Mundo
"Despechá"	2022	Rosalía	Motomami +
"Baccarat"	2023	Ozuna	Cosmo
"No Te Quieren Conmigo" (or remix with Anuel AA featuring Bryant Myers)	2023	Gaby Music, Lunay, Luar La L	None
