= Ahora Dice =

2017 single by Chris Jedi, J Balvin and Ozuna

Single by Chris Jedi, J Balvin and Ozuna featuring Arcángel
- English title: "Now She Says"
- Released: March 17, 2017
- Genre: Latin trap
- Length: 4:31
- Label: Universal Latino
- Songwriters: Jean-Pierre Soto Pascual; Rafael Pina; Luis E. Ortiz

Chris Jedi singles chronology
| "Dale Hasta Abajo" (2016) | "Ahora Dice" (2017) | "Ahora Dice (Remix)" (2018) |

Music video
- "Ahora Dice" on YouTube

"Ahora Dice" (transl. "Now She Says") is a song by Puerto Rican record producer Chris Jedi, interpreted by J Balvin, Ozuna and Arcángel. The official remix features Cardi B, Offset and Anuel AA.

== Chart performance ==
"Ahora Dice" peaked at number four on the Latin Streaming Songs chart on the issue dated June 24, 2017.

As of December 2022, the music video for the song has received over 1.3 billion views on YouTube.

== Charts ==
=== Weekly charts ===
| Chart (2017) | Peak position |
|---|---|
| Dominican Republic (Monitor Latino) | 18 |
| Paraguay (Monitor Latino) | 14 |
| US Bubbling Under Hot 100 (Billboard) | 4 |
| US Hot Latin Songs (Billboard) | 7 |
| US Latin Airplay (Billboard) | 23 |
| US Latin Rhythm Airplay (Billboard) | 12 |

=== Year-end charts ===
| Chart (2017) | Position |
|---|---|
| México (AMPROFON) | 8 |
| Spain (PROMUSICAE) | 17 |
| US Hot Latin Songs (Billboard) | 10 |

| Chart (2018) | Position |
|---|---|
| Dominican Republic Streaming (Monitor Latino) | 97 |

== Certifications ==
| Region | Certification | Certified units/sales |
|---|---|---|
| Brazil (Pro-Música Brasil) | Gold | 30,000^{‡} |
| Italy (FIMI) | Gold | 25,000^{‡} |
| Spain (Promusicae) | 4× Platinum | 160,000^{‡} |
| United States (RIAA) | 2× Platinum (Latin) | 120,000^{‡} |
Streaming
| Chile (Profovi) | Platinum | 8,000,000 |
^{‡} Sales+streaming figures based on certification alone.
