= No Te Olvido =

Unreleased 2024 song by J Balvin and Anuel AA

Song by J Balvin and Anuel AA
- Language: Spanish
- English title: "I Don't Forget You"
- Released: July 11, 2024 (leak)
- Recorded: 2023
- Genre: Reggaeton
- Length: 2:50
- Songwriter: José Álvaro Osorio Balvín • Emmanuel Gazmey Santiago • Edgar Semper • Luian Malave • Xavier Semper
- Producer: DJ Luian • Mambo Kingz

"No Te Olvido" (transl. "I Don't Forget You", also known as "Yo No Te Olvido") is an unreleased song by Colombian singer J Balvin and Puerto Rican rapper Anuel AA. The song was written in 2023 for J Balvin's upcoming studio album Sonríe, Estás en Cámara titled later Rayo (2024), but was cut for problems between two artists. It became clear when Anuel AA used his verse in other song titled "Bad Boy". On July 11, 2024, the song initially leaked online.

== Background ==
After the release of Más Rica Que Ayer, Anuel AA was spotted in a music studio alongside J Balvin, Maluma and Jhayco in March, 2023. At the end of the video for the single Mejor Que Yo, J Balvin appeared alongside Anuel AA confirming their upcoming collaboration, which was supposed to be in J Balvin's upcoming album Rayo (2024). J Balvin was spotted singing a song known as "No Te Olvido", containing featuring vocals by Anuel AA. In August, 2023, J Balvin uploaded preview on Instagram of the song, produced by Puerto Rican producer duo DJ Luian and Mambo Kingz.

== Cancellation and leak ==
American rapper Eladio Carrión was invited on one of J Balvin's concerts, where he declared Carrion is "the king of (Latin) trap". Anuel AA, regarded as one of the best Latin trap artists, mentioned J Balvin in his first diss track "Glock, Glock, Glock" for Puerto Rican rapper Arcángel: (Spanish: "Y, Balvin, sí, sabemos que Eladio es un rey del trap, pero no digas que es el único, canto de estúpido") (And yes, Balvin, we know that Eladion is a king of trap, but you didn't say that he is the one singing nonsense). Later, J Balvin stated in an Instagram Live that this has not affected his peace of mind and he is focused on his family.

In February, 2024, Anuel AA featured alongside Ozuna on the single "Bad Boy" by Chris Jedi, Gaby Music and Dei V, part of the latter's extended play Los Marcianos, Vol. 1: Dei V Version. Anuel AA used a similar to his verse from his song with J Balvin. This further indicated that "No Te Olvido" will never be released.

In late June, 2024, a 20-second-preview of the intro and chorus of "No Te Olvido" came forward in social media. The song was completely leaked on July 11, 2024.
