= Real Hasta la Muerte 2 Tour =

2024–25 concert tour by Anuel AA

- Tour by Anuel AA
- Location: North America; South America
- Associated album: Real Hasta la Muerte 2
- Start date: November 3, 2024
- End date: March 15, 2025
- No. of shows: 30
- Website: realhastalamuerte.com

Anuel AA concert chronology
- Europe Tour (2024); Real Hasta la Muerte 2 Tour (2024–2025)

Real Hasta la Muerte 2 Tour was the seventh concert tour by Puerto Rican rapper and singer-songwriter Anuel AA, supporting his fifth solo studio album, Real Hasta la Muerte 2. Promoted by Real Hasta la Muerte, the tour started on November 3, 2024 in Buenos Aires, Argentina, and was supposed to end on March 15, 2025, in Miami, Florida before some of the shows were postponed. It includes 30 shows across 27 cities in South America and North America.

== Background ==
After the end of the Europe Tour in 2024, Anuel AA promised that he would make another tour in North America and South America. On September 19, 2024, the 2024 dates for the Real Hasta la Muerte 2 USA Tour was announced by CNM events. Later, Anuel AA announced the dates for the concerts in 2025 on his Instagram page.

Later, it was announced that the first show from the Real Hasta la Muerte 2 South America Tour is expected to be on November 3, 2024, in Buenos Aires, Argentina. After three sold-out shows at Movistar Arena in Santiago, Chile, a fourth concert was scheduled to take place on November 15, 2024, at the same venue.

== Tour dates ==
Date	City	Country	Venue
November 3, 2024	Buenos Aires	Argentina	Tecnópolis
November 6, 2024	Santiago	Chile	Movistar Arena
November 12, 2024	Santiago	Chile	Movistar Arena
November 14, 2024	Santiago	Chile	Movistar Arena
November 15, 2024	Santiago	Chile	Movistar Arena
November 27, 2024	Dallas	United States	Dickies Arena
November 29, 2024	Houston	United States	Smart Financial Centre
November 30, 2024	Austin	United States	H-E-B Center at Cedar Park
December 1, 2024	Hidalgo	United States	Payne Arena
December 5, 2024	Glendale	United States	Desert Diamond Arena
December 6, 2024	Las Vegas	United States	Michelob Ultra Arena
December 8, 2024	Anaheim	United States	Honda Center
December 12, 2024	Ontario	United States	Toyota Arena
December 13, 2024	Los Angeles	United States	Crypto.com Arena
December 15, 2024	San Jose	United States	SAP Center
February 13, 2025	Seattle	United States	Climate Pledge Arena
February 14, 2025	Portland	United States	Moda Center
February 16, 2025	Salt Lake City	United States	Delta Center
February 21, 2025	Chicago	United States	Allstate Arena
February 23, 2025	Boston	United States	Agganis Arena
February 27, 2025	Reading	United States	Santander Arena
February 28, 2025	Uncasville	United States	Mohegan Sun Arena
March 1, 2025	Brooklyn	United States	Barclays Center
March 2, 2025	Newark	United States	Prudential Center
March 6, 2025	Washington	United States	EagleBank Arena
March 7, 2025	Charlotte	United States	Spectrum Center
March 9, 2025	Atlanta	United States	Gas South Arena
March 13, 2025	Orlando	United States	Kia Center
March 14, 2025	Tampa	United States	Amalie Arena
March 15, 2025	Miami	United States	Kaseya Center
