= Erika Mejía =

Businesswoman (born 1986)

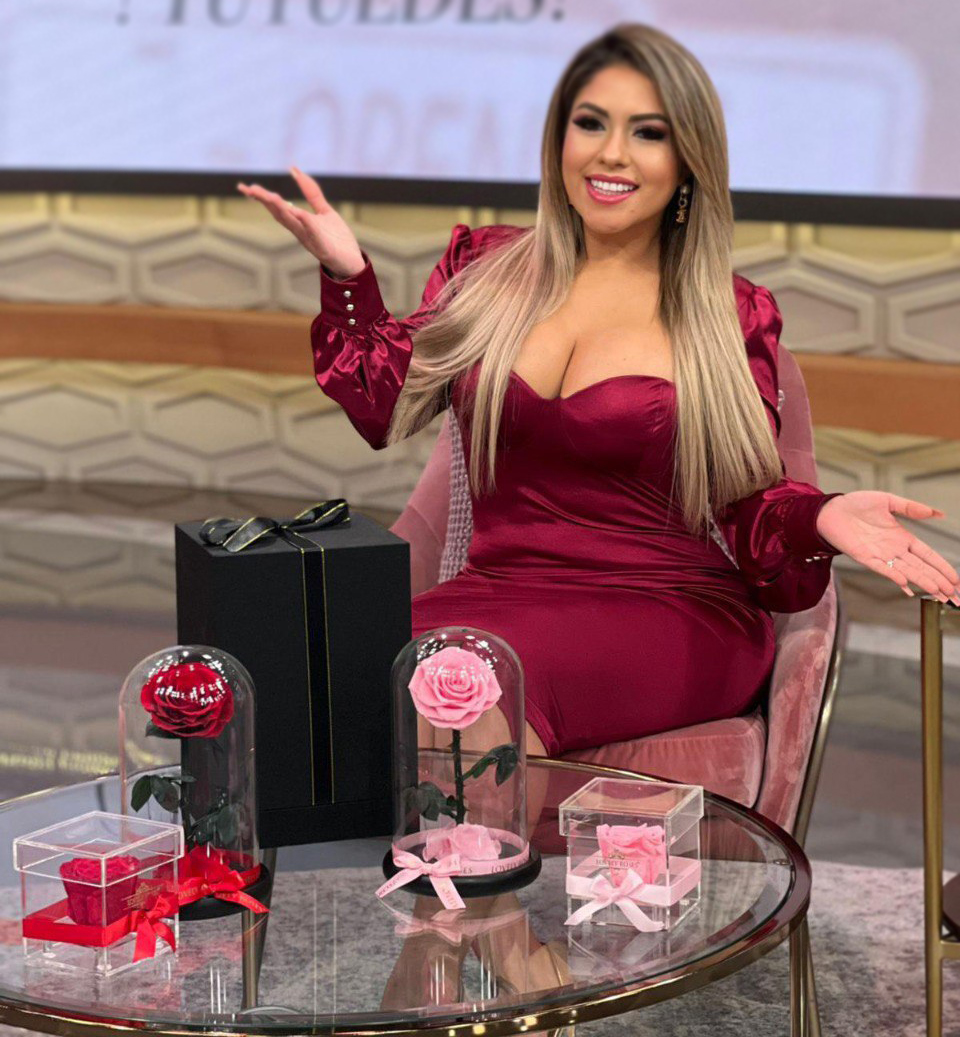
- Born: July 30, 1986 (age 39); San Pedro Sula, Honduras
- Occupation: Businesswoman
- Years active: 2014-present
- Known for: Flower arrangements with preserved roses

Erika Mejía (born 30 July 1986) is a Honduran florist and businesswoman, and CEO of WorldStaff USA and Lovely Roses, who has participated in major events such as Premios lo Nuestro 2018 and 2019, Latin Grammy, Premios Juventud and Nuestra Belleza Latina with its floral arrangements based on the preservation of roses.

Known as "the artist's florist," she has done work for celebrities such as Thalía, Pitbull, Demi Lovato, Camila Cabello, Luis Fonsi, and Anuel AA among others.

== Career ==
Mejía emigrated to the United States on September 15, the day of independence in Honduras, in 2006 at the age of 19, fleeing crime in her native country. Her mother and her stepfather owned a cable company. This is how the nickname for Erika and her brothers of "the children of the cable" was born. Mejía shared in various interviews that she arrived in Miami at the age of 19 and had only 200 dollars in her pocket.

In the USA, she began by working in an office for an employment agency. Two years later, when she became unemployed, she got a new opportunity as a waitress, later in a flower shop, however, she later decided to start in an employment agency where she did not do well.

The failure of this employment agency, the work that bankruptcy generated for her, and the multiple jobs she had to do to raise the capital that would allow her to start a new agency a few years later, are some of the events that Mejía recalls as triggers for creating a new company. It would be in 2011 that WorldStaff USA would arrive, being an employment agency located in Miami, which would gradually expand with locations in Florida, New York, New Jersey, Texas, Pennsylvania and Minnesota.

When the new employment agency was just beginning to bear fruit, the arrangements of roses as gifts kept arriving at the office, and with them, Mejía made gifts for other people. One day she decided and created the business that launched her career as a businesswoman: being a florist with flower arrangements that could last for years.

The first Lovely Roses store opened in January 2018 in Doral. In May she opened the second, on Miracle Mile, which celebrated the official opening party with the presence of the mayor of Coral Gables, Raúl Valdés Fauli. In 2019, she shared part of her entrepreneurial experience in three workshops given in Miami. Now known as "the queen of roses", she has also briefly explained how to make flower arrangements like the ones she distributes. One of her biggest customers has been Anuel AA, who purchased more than ten thousand roses and multiple details for Karol G before the two ended their engagement. Other details have been allocated to Maluma, Pitbull, Demi Lovato, and the edition of Beauty and the Beast that includes a rose like the one in the film adapted by Disney.

In 2020, Erika led a humanitarian campaign to collect supplies for families in Honduras that were affected by Hurricane Eta.

At the beginning of 2021, the United States imported around 660 million flowers grown in Colombia, contributing an important figure for Colombian floriculture, with Erika being one of its main contributors. In the case of Ecuador, the limitations have been a little more marked by the current pandemic, however, Erika Mejía continues to contribute to the economy of that country with contributions to flower growers and betting on the Ecuadorian industry.

In 2021, the businesswoman received media attention by proposing that flowers be given on Father's Day as well, stating that "flowers are not for a specific gender". In a video posted on the official YouTube account of Lovely Roses, Mejía recorded what it was like to once again bring her preserved roses to the Latin Grammy gala.

== Personal life ==
With Juan Manuel Alonso, also an entrepreneur, she works for Lovely Roses and the employment agency WorldStaff USA. She is the mother of two children.

== Participations ==
- 2018: Lo Nuestro Awards
- 2019: Lo Nuestro Awards
- 2019: Latin Grammy Awards
- 2020: Latin Grammy Awards
- 2020: Premios Juventud
- 2021: Latin Grammy Awards
