= Las que no iban a salir =

2020 compilation album by Bad Bunny

Las Que No Iban a Salir

Compilation album by Bad Bunny
- Released: May 10, 2020
- Recorded: 2018–2020
- Genre: Latin trap; reggaeton
- Length: 30:19
- Language: Spanish
- Label: Rimas

Bad Bunny chronology
| YHLQMDLG (2020) | Las Que No Iban a Salir (2020) | El Último Tour Del Mundo (2020) |

Singles from Las Que No Iban a Salir
- 1. "En Casita" Released: April 4, 2020; 2. "Cómo Se Siente (remix)" Released: May 10, 2020

Las Que No Iban a Salir (pronounced [ˈlas ke no ˈiβan a saˈliɾ]; transl. The Ones That Were Not Coming Out; stylized in all caps) is the first compilation album by Puerto Rican rapper and singer Bad Bunny. It was released without any previous announcement on May 10, 2020, by Rimas Entertainment. It features guest appearances by Zion & Lennox, Yandel, Don Omar, Nicky Jam, Jhayco, and Bad Bunny's girlfriend Gabriela Berlingeri.

== Background and singles ==
Bad Bunny teased some of the songs included on the album on Instagram, one week before the official release. Some songs were presented by him as unreleased tracks that didn't make the final cut of his studio albums X 100pre and YHLQMDLG. Parts of the album were recorded while being in quarantine due to the COVID-19 pandemic. "En Casita" featuring Bad Bunny's then-girlfriend Gabriela was released on April 4, 2020, as the album's lead single, exclusively on SoundCloud. "Cómo Se Siente (remix)" was released as the album's second single on May 10, 2020, alongside the album.

== Critical reception ==
Professional ratings
Aggregate scores
| Source | Rating |
|---|---|
| Metacritic | 77/100 |
Review scores
| Source | Rating |
| AllMusic | 3.5/5 stars |
| Consequence | B |
| Pitchfork | 7.2/10 |
| Rolling Stone | 4/5 stars |

Six days after its release, Pitchfork's Matthew Ismael Ruiz described Las que no iban a salir as "quick and dirty, with uncharacteristically crunchy production value and lo-fi aesthetics." 9 out of 10 songs were scrapped from his previous album YHLQMDLG, and was put together in two days. Despite its roughness, it received positive reviews from music critics.

== Commercial performance ==
The album debuted at number 7 on the US Billboard 200 with 42,000 album-equivalent units, including 46.2 million streams and 8,000 pure album sales. It marked Bad Bunny's third top 10 album in less than a year. Notably, the album debuted in the top 10 the same week his previous album YHLQMDLG fell out of the top 10 for the first time since its debut on the chart. Also, the album debuted at number one on the US Billboard Top Latin Albums replacing his previous album YHLQMDLG becoming one of the few artist to do that in that chart. Simultaneously, in that same week Bad Bunny held the numbers one, two and three (with YHLQMDLG and X 100pre) on the Top Latin Albums chart, becoming the first time that this happened since Juan Gabriel's death. Las que no iban a salir was the fifth best selling Latin album of 2020 in the United States, with 315,000 equivalent album units.

== Track listing ==
Las Que No Iban a Salir track listing
| No. | Title | Writer(s) | Producer(s) | Length |
|---|---|---|---|---|
| 1. | "Si Ella Sale" | Benito Martínez; Ronald Spence, Jr.; Maddox Grayson; Edgar Machuca | Ronny J; Grayson^{[a]} | 2:23 |
| 2. | "Más de Una Cita" (with Zion & Lennox) | Martínez; Félix Ortiz; Gabriel Pizarro; Marco Masís; Abner Boria | Tainy; Jota Rosa | 3:03 |
| 3. | "Bye Me Fui" | Martínez; Ivaniel Ortiz; José Cruz; Freddy Montalvo | Súbelo NEO; Hazen | 2:58 |
| 4. | "Canción con Yandel" (with Yandel) | Martínez; Llandel Veguilla; Ernesto Padilla; Juan Morales; Antony Aular; Luis Camero | Nesty | 3:29 |
| 5. | "Pa' Romperla" (with Don Omar) | Martínez; William Landrón; Masis; Jesús Nieves | Tainy; Jhay Cortez | 3:14 |
| 6. | "Bad con Nicky" (with Nicky Jam) | Martínez; Nick Rivera; Carlos Ortiz; Juan Rivera; Cruz; Montalvo; Nino Segarra; Jose Ortiz; Luis Ortiz | Chris Jedi; Gaby Music; Dímelo Ninow; Súbelo NEO | 3:22 |
| 7. | "Bendiciones" | Martínez; J. Rivera; Masis; C. Ortiz; L. Ortiz; J. Ortiz | Jedi; Gaby Music; Tainy | 2:35 |
| 8. | "Cómo Se Siente" (remix with Jhayco) | Martínez; Nieves; Masís; Elvin Rodriguez; Nydia Lander; Sergoio Roldan | Tainy; Ammunation^{[a]} | 3:47 |
| 9. | "Ronca Freestyle" | Martínez; Michael Torres; Misael Reynoso; Orlando Matos; José Reyes; Omar Rivera-Maldonado; Anthony Medina | Misael de la Cruz; Kyle Stemberger^{[a]} | 2:30 |
| 10. | "En Casita" (featuring Gabriela) | Martínez; Jonathan Rotem | J. R. Rotem | 2:56 |
| Total length: | | | | 30:19 |

Notes

- ^{^[a]} signifies an uncredited co-producer
- Every song title is stylized in all capital letters, for example, "En Casita" is stylized as "EN CASITA".

== Charts ==
=== Weekly charts ===
Chart performance for Las que no iban a salir
| Chart (2020) | Peak position |
|---|---|
| Belgian Albums (Ultratop Wallonia) | 159 |
| French Albums (SNEP) | 172 |
| Italian Albums (FIMI) | 90 |
| Spanish Streaming Albums (PROMUSICAE) | 1 |
| Swiss Albums (Schweizer Hitparade) | 37 |
| US Billboard 200 | 7 |
| US Top Latin Albums (Billboard) | 1 |
| US Latin Rhythm Albums (Billboard) | 1 |
| US Independent Albums (Billboard) | 1 |

=== Year-end charts ===
Year-end chart performance for Las que no iban a salir
| Chart (2020) | Position |
|---|---|
| Spanish Albums (PROMUSICAE) | 14 |
| US Billboard 200 | 174 |
| US Top Latin Albums (Billboard) | 4 |
| Chart (2021) | Position |
| Spanish Albums (PROMUSICAE) | 74 |
| US Top Latin Albums (Billboard) | 10 |
| Chart (2022) | Position |
| Spanish Albums (PROMUSICAE) | 85 |

== Certifications ==
| Region | Certification | Certified units/sales |
|---|---|---|
| Spain (Promusicae) | Platinum | 40,000^{‡} |
| United States (RIAA) | 3× Platinum (Latin) | 180,000^{‡} |
^{‡} Sales+streaming figures based on certification alone.

== See also ==
- 2020 in Latin music
- List of number-one Billboard Latin Albums from the 2020s
