= Hasta Que Dios Diga =

Song by Anuel AA and Bad Bunny

from the album Emmanuel
- Language: Spanish
- Released: May 29, 2020
- Recorded: 2020
- Genre: Reggaeton
- Length: 4:06
- Label: Real Hasta la Muerte; Sony Latin
- Songwriters: Emmanuel Gazmey; Benito Martínez
- Producers: Chris Jedi; Gaby Music; Dímelo Ninow

Music video
- "Hasta Que Dios Diga" on YouTube

"Hasta Que Dios Diga" (transl. "Until God Says") is a song by Puerto Rican rappers Anuel AA and Bad Bunny. It was released on May 29, 2020, through Real Hasta la Muerte and Sony Latin as a track on Anuel AA's second studio album Emmanuel, with a music video released on the same day.

== Background ==
Previously, the song was previewed by Anuel AA in April, 2020. On May 27, 2020, Anuel AA announced his second studio album Emmanuel, and "Hasta Que Dios Diga" was included as the fifth track.

== Commercial performance ==
"Hasta Que Dios Diga" debuted and peaked at number 86 on the Billboard Hot 100 chart and at number four on the Billboard Hot Latin Songs dated June 13, 2020. The song also debuted at number two on Spain's official chart dated May 29, 2020, before reaching the top of the chart in its second week. It peaked at number 33 on Argentina Hot 100's chart dated July 11, 2020.

== Music video ==
The video was released on May 29, 2020, and has so far garnered over 347 million views. It was filmed in Puerto Rico and Miami, Florida.

== Charts ==
=== Weekly charts ===
Weekly chart performance for "Hasta Que Dios Diga"
Chart (2020)	Peak position
Argentina (Argentina Hot 100)	33
Spain (PROMUSICAE)	1
US Billboard Hot 100	86
US Hot Latin Songs (Billboard)	4

=== Year-end charts ===
2020 year-end chart performance for "Hasta Que Dios Diga"
Chart (2020)	Position
Spain (PROMUSICAE)	31
US Hot Latin Songs (Billboard)	43

== Certifications ==
Certifications and sales for "Hasta Que Dios Diga"
Region	Certification	Certified units/sales
Italy (FIMI)	Gold	50,000^{‡}
Mexico (AMPROFON)	Gold	30,000^{‡}
Spain (Promusicae)	5× Platinum	300,000^{‡}
^{‡} Sales+streaming figures based on certification alone.
