= No Te Quieren Conmigo =

2023 single by Gaby Music, Lunay and Luar la L

Single by Gaby Music, Lunay and Luar la L
- Language: Spanish
- Released: December 14, 2023
- Genre: Reggaeton
- Length: 4:11
- Label: La Familia; Universal Latino
- Songwriters: Juan Gabriel Rivera; Jefnier Osorio Moreno; Raul Del Valle Robles; Carlos Enrique Ortiz Rivera; Randy Ortiz Acevedo; Andres Jael Correa Rios; Jesus Eduardo Fernandez-Calderon; Gerald Oscar Jimenez; Vicente Saavedra
- Producers: Gaby Music; Chris Jedi; Yizus

Gaby Music singles chronology
"Duro" (2022)	"No Te Quieren Conmigo" (2023)	"Bad Boy" (2024)

Lunay singles chronology
"Baby" (2023)	"No Te Quieren Conmigo" (2023)	"Hora y Lugar" (2024)

Luar la L singles chronology
"UuU2" (2023)	"No Te Quieren Conmigo" (2023)	"Al Otro Nivel" (2023)

Music video
- "No Te Quieren Conmigo" on YouTube

"No Te Quieren Conmigo" is a song by Puerto Rican producer and songwriter Gaby Music, Puerto Rican singer Lunay and Puerto Rican rapper and singer Luar la L. It was released on December 14, 2023, through La Familia and Universal Music Latino. Due to its popularity, the song got remixed with Anuel AA and Bryant Myers on April 4, 2024.

== Background and composition ==
In July, 2023, Lunay uploaded a preview of the song claiming that Luar la L will be part of the project too.

The song is produced by Gaby Music, Chris Jedi and Yizuk and interpolates the iconic single "Hola Bebé" by Héctor el Father and Jowell & Randy.

== Music video ==
The music video of "No Te Quieren Conmigo" was directed by Kevin Quiles and JIX and got more than 100 million views. It offers a captivating visual experience that complements the intensity of the single.

== Charts ==
Chart performance for "No Te Quieren Conmigo"
Chart (2023)	Peak position
Argentina Hot 100 (Billboard)	56
Chile (Billboard)	12
Ecuador (Billboard)	24
Global 200 (Billboard)	167
Honduras (Monitor Latino)	15
Peru (Billboard)	13
Spain (PROMUSICAE)	4
Spain (Billboard)	4
US Latin Rhythm Airplay (Billboard)	25
US Hot Latin Songs (Billboard)	36

== Certifications ==
Certifications and sales for "No Te Quieren Conmigo"
Region	Certification	Certified units/sales
Spain (Promusicae)	2× Platinum	120,000^{‡}
^{‡} Sales+streaming figures based on certification alone.

== Remix ==
"No Te Quieren Conmigo (remix)"

Remix by Gaby Music, Anuel AA and Luar la L featuring Lunay and Bryant Myers
- Language: Spanish
- Released: April 4, 2024
- Genre: Reggaeton
- Length: 5:28
- Label: La Familia; Universal Latino
- Producers: Gaby Music; Chris Jedi; Yizuk

Lyrics video
- "No Te Quieren Conmigo (remix)" on YouTube

On April 4, 2024, an official remix with Anuel AA featuring Bryant Myers was released with a lyrics video on Gaby Music's YouTube channel. An official video is expected to be premiered as Anuel AA and Lunay were spotted filming music video for the remix.

After the release of the original song, an Anuel AA AI-made remix of the song became popular on social media. It inspired the artists to make it happen. Lunay said in an interview that the second feature as a "surprise" starting with the letter "O". Omar Courtz hinted on his participation on the remix via X. Later Anuel AA announced via Kick that the song will come out. In early April, 2024, Anuel AA posted an official preview of the remix of "No Te Quieren Conmigo" claiming that it will come out on April 4, 2024. After the release, it became clear that the surprise feature was Bryant Myers.

In the lyrics, Anuel AA mentioned Puerto Rican rappers Arcángel and Cosculluela claiming that his feud with both of them is still ongoing.

In July, 2024, a previous remix version got leaked, which shows Ozuna was supposed to be on the official one. However, he participated only as a songwriter.
