= Quiere Beber =

2018 song by Anuel AA

Song by Anuel AA

from the album Real Hasta la Muerte
- Language: Spanish
- Released: July 17, 2018
- Studio: The Hit Factory
- Genre: Reggaeton
- Length: 3:08
- Label: Real Hasta la Muerte
- Songwriters: Emmanuel Gazmey Santiago; Carlos Enrique Ortiz Rivera; Juan Gabriel Rivera; Luis Enrique Ortiz Rivera; Nino Segarra
- Producers: Chris Jedi; Gaby Music

Music video
- "Quiere Beber" on YouTube

"Quiere Beber" (transl. "Wants To Drink") is a song by Puerto Rican rapper Anuel AA released as a track on his album Real Hasta la Muerte on July 17, 2018 through Real Hasta la Muerte. A music video was released on August 15, 2018. Due to the songs popularity, it got remixed with Romeo Santos on November 1, 2018 as "Ella Quiere Beber" (transl. "She Wants To Drink").

== Background ==
On July 17, 2018, Anuel AA's debut studio album Real Hasta la Muerte was available in all music platforms at the moment he was released from prison. "Quiere Beber" was included as the second track with an audio visualizer uploaded to YouTube along with the other song visualizers that appeared on the album and got 105 million views.

== Composition ==
Anuel AA wrote "Quiere Beber" with Puerto Rican producers Chris Jedi and Gaby Music, who produced the song, alongside Jonathony and Wichi. It is about a woman whose man failed her and tries to recover from that dark moment in her life. American singer Nicky Jam helped Anuel AA for the chore of this song. In the lyrics, the latter makes reference to Romeo Santos' song Hilito: "Bailando en un hilito de Romeo".

== Music video ==
The music video for "Quiere Beber" was released on August 15, 2018. It was filmed in Miami, Florida and produced by Venezuelan video director Nuno Gomes. It shows Anuel AA singing from a prison bar. At the end of the video, he got released from prison while a part from the intro from his debut studio album "Na' Nuevo" was played in the background.

== Charts ==
Chart performance for "Quiere Beber"
| Chart (2018) | Peak position |
|---|---|
| Bolivia (Monitor Latino) | 6 |
| Chile (Monitor Latino) | 2 |
| Colombia (Monitor Latino) | 4 |
| Costa Rica (Monitor Latino) | 11 |
| Dominican Republic (Monitor Latino) | 2 |
| Ecuador (Monitor Latino) | 5 |
| El Salvador (Monitor Latino) | 3 |
| Guatemala (Monitor Latino) | 15 |
| Honduras (Monitor Latino) | 2 |
| Nicaragua (Monitor Latino) | 9 |
| Puerto Rico (Monitor Latino) | 8 |
| Spain (Promusicae) | 6 |
| United States (Monitor Latino) | 17 |
| Venezuela (Monitor Latino) | 11 |

== Certifications ==
Certifications and sales for "Quiere Beber"
| Region | Certification | Certified units/sales |
|---|---|---|
| Spain (Promusicae) | 3× Platinum | 180,000^{‡} |
| United States (RIAA) | 9× Platinum (Latin) | 540,000^{‡} |
^{‡} Sales+streaming figures based on certification alone.

== Remix ==
"Ella Quiere Beber"

Single by Anuel AA and Romeo Santos
- Released: November 1, 2018
- Genre: Reggaeton
- Length: 3:39
- Label: Real Hasta la Muerte
- Songwriters: Emmanuel Gazmey Santiago; Romeo Santos; Carlos Enrique Rivera Ortíz; Juan Gabriel Rivera; Joan Antonio González Marrero; Luis Enrique Rivera Ortiz; Jose Enrique Rivera Ortiz; Miguel Muniz Rohena; Unknown writer
- Producers: Chris Jedi; Gaby Music

Anuel AA singles chronology
| "Asesina" (remix) (2018) | "Ella Quiere Beber" (2018) | "Bubalú" (2018) |

Romeo Santos singles chronology
| "Bellas" (2018) | "Ella Quiere Beber" (2018) | "Aullando" (2019) |

Music video
- "Ella Quiere Beber" on YouTube

The official remix version for the song titled "Ella Quiere Beber" was released in November 1, 2018, with the participation of Romeo Santos.

=== Music video ===
The video of "Ella Quiere Beber" was released alongside the song. It was directed by José Emilio Sagaró and as of 2024, the music video overall has over 790 million views on YouTube.

=== Charts ===
==== Weekly charts ====
| Chart (2018–2019) | Peak position |
|---|---|
| Argentina Hot 100 (Billboard) | 14 |
| Italy (FIMI) | 59 |
| Mexico Espanol Airplay (Billboard) | 34 |
| Spain (Promusicae) | 7 |
| US Billboard Hot 100 | 61 |
| US Hot Latin Songs (Billboard) | 4 |
| US Latin Airplay (Billboard) | 1 |
| US Latin Rhythm Airplay (Billboard) | 1 |

==== Year-end charts ====
| Chart (2018) | Position |
|---|---|
| US Hot Latin Songs (Billboard) | 48 |
| Chart (2019) | Position |
| US Hot Latin Songs (Billboard) | 5 |
| Spain (PROMUSICAE) | 30 |

==== Decade-end charts ====
| Chart (2010–2019) | Position |
|---|---|
| US Hot Latin Songs (Billboard) | 44 |

==== Certifications ====
Certifications and sales for "Ella Quiere Beber"
| Region | Certification | Certified units/sales |
|---|---|---|
| Italy (FIMI) | Platinum | 70,000^{‡} |
| Spain (Promusicae) | 5× Platinum | 300,000^{‡} |
| United States (RIAA) | Platinum (Latin) | 60,000^{‡} |
^{‡} Sales+streaming figures based on certification alone.

== See also ==
- List of Billboard number-one Latin songs of 2019
