= Cosmo (Ozuna album) =

Studio album by Ozuna
- Released: November 17, 2023
- Genre: Reggaeton; Latin urban; dembow; EDM
- Length: 45:11
- Language: Spanish
- Label: Aura; Sony Latin
- Producer: SHB; Nuviala; Scar; Chris Jedi; Gaby Music; Sky Rompiendo; Taiko; Botlok; DerBeat; Rios; DJ Maff; David Guetta; Rolo; Tainy; Mvsis; Jowan; DJ Blass; Yampi; Kavy

Ozuna chronology
Afro (2023)	Cosmo (2023)

Singles from Cosmo
- 1. "El Plan" Released: November 13, 2023; 2. "Fenti" Released: November 16, 2023; 3. "Vocation" Released: November 17, 2023; 4. "Made In Qatar" Released: November 21, 2023

Cosmo is the sixth studio album by Puerto Rican singer Ozuna. It was released on November 17, 2023, through Aura Music and Sony Music Latin. The album features collaborations with Sky Rompiendo, Chencho Corleone, Maldy, De la Ghetto, Anuel AA, Chris Jedi, David Guetta, Jhayco and Lito MC Cassidy.

== Background and release ==
On November 10, 2023, Ozuna announced the album's title and then the track listing, scheduled to be released on November 17.

== Promotion ==
=== Singles ===
The album was promoted by the release of four singles:

- "El Plan" with Puerto Rican singer Chencho Corleone and Colombian producer Sky Rompiendo was released on November 13, 2023, as the debut single from the album along with the announcement of the album's premiere.
- "Fenti" with Puerto Rican singer Jhayco was released on November 16, 2023, as the second single, and one day before the album's release.
- "Vocation" with French DJ David Guetta, was released simultaneously with the album on November 17, 2023, with first ever performance at the 2023 / The 24th Annual Latin Grammy Awards ceremony, showcasing their energy and undeniable chemistry on stage. At the 2024 Latin American Music Awards, the track was nominated for Crossover Collaboration of the Year, competing against tracks like Niña Bonita by Feid and Sean Paul, which ultimately took home the award, also the song was nominated as - My favorite "dance track" at the 2024 Premios Juventud-.
- "Made In Qatar" was released as the fourth single along a music video on November 21, 2023.

== Track listing ==
Cosmo track listing
No.	Title	Writer(s)	Producer(s)	Length
1.	"Made In Qatar"	Juan Carlos Ozuna Rosado; Sohaib Temssamani Takal; Gonzalo Nuviala Pedruzo; José Antonio Aponte; Jesús Manuel Benitez Hiraldo; Louis Jacoberger	SHB; Nuviala; Scar	2:31
2.	"Baccarat"	Juan Carlos Ozuna Rosado; Carlos Enrique Ortíz Rivera; Juan G. Rivera Vázquez; Orlando Aponte Ortíz; Jesús Manuel Benitez Hiraldo	Chris Jedi; Gaby Music	3:18
3.	"El Plan" (with Chencho Corleone and Sky Rompiendo)	Juan Carlos Ozuna Rosado; Alejandro Ramírez Suárez; Orlando Javier Valle Vega; José Antonio Aponte; Jesús Manuel Benitez Hiraldo; Nicolás Jaña Galleguillos	Sky Rompiendo; Taiko	3:47
4.	"Brabus" (with Maldy)	Juan Carlos Ozuna Rosado; Edwin F. Vázquez Vega; Alejandro Ramírez Suárez; Jesús Manuel Benitez Hiraldo; Nicolás Jaña Gallegillos	Sky Rompiendo; Taiko	2:25
5.	"Clase Azul"	Juan Carlos Ozuna Rosado; Andres Jael Correa Ríos; Elvin Jesús Roubert Rodríguez; José Antonio Aponte; Jesús Manuel Nieves; Luis Ángel O'Neill; Andrés Jese Gavillan Batista; Gerald Oscar Jiménez	Botlok	3:29
6.	"Mar de Lágrimas"	Juan Carlos Ozuna Rosado; Andrés Jael Correa Ríos; Gerald Oscar Jiménez; David Escobar Rivera; José Antonio Aponte; Rene A. Basabe; Antonio Manuel Colón Rodríguez	DerBeat; Ríos	2:55
7.	"A.B.C."	Juan Carlos Ozuna Rosado; Alejandro Ramírez Suárez; Andrés Jael Correa Ríos; Gerald Oscar Jiménez; Andrés David Restrepo	Sky Rompiendo	2:24
8.	"La Chulita" (with De la Ghetto)	Juan Carlos Ozuna Rosado; Rafael Castillo Torres; Alejandro Ramírez Suárez; José Antonio Aponte; Marvin Hawkins Rodríguez	Sky Rompiendo; DJ Maff	3:28
9.	"Pa Ti Estoy" (with Anuel AA and Chris Jedi)	Juan Carlos Ozuna Rosado; Emmanuel Gazmey Santiago; Carlos Enrique Ortíz Rivera; Juan G. Rivera Vázquez; José Antonio Aponte; Nino Karlo Segarra	Chris Jedi; Gaby Music	3:27
10.	"Vocation" (with David Guetta)	David Guetta; Juan Carlos Ozuna Rosado; Yazid Rivera López; David Sprecher; Benjamín Falik; Johnny Goldstein; Andrés Jael Correa Ríos; Max Borghetti; Alejandro Robledo Valencia; Lenin Yorney Palacios; Gerald Oscar Jiménez; Kevyn Mauricio Cruz Moreno; Spread LOF/Noelle's Afikoman	David Guetta; Johnny Goldstein; Julia Lewis; Yeti Beats	3:05
11.	"La 65"	Juan Carlos Ozuna Rosado; Andrés Jael Correa Ríos; Gerald Oscar Jiménez; Luis A. Oneill; Andrés David Restrepo Echavarría; Sebastien Graux; Eduardo Andrés Puche; José Antonio Aponte	Chris Jedi; Gaby Music	2:11
12.	"Fenti" (with Jhayco)	Juan Carlos Ozuna Rosado; Jesús Manuel Nieves Cortés; Marcos Efraín Masís; Michael Bryan Masis; José Antonio Aponte	Tainy; Mvsis	3:19
13.	"El Pin"	Juan Carlos Ozuna Rosado; Andrés Jael Correa Ríos; Gerald Oscar Jiménez; Andrés David Restrepo Echavarría; Johan Esteban Espinosa	Jowan	3:01
14.	"100 Squats"	Juan Carlos Ozuna Rosado; Vladimir Felix; Jean Pierre Soto; José Antonio Aponte	DJ Blass; Yampi	2:32
15.	"SM" (with Lito MC Cassidy)	Juan Carlos Ozuna Rosado; Diego Fernando Caviedes Franco; Rafael Sierra; Jesús Manuel Benitez Hiraldo; José Antonio Aponte	Kavy	3:19
Total length:				45:11

== Charts ==
Chart performance for Cosmo
Chart (2023)	Peak position
Spanish Albums (PROMUSICAE)	7
US Billboard 200	116
US Top Latin Albums (Billboard)	9
US Latin Rhythm Albums (Billboard)	5
