= Peligrosa (Lartiste and Karol G song) =

Song by Lartiste and Karol G

Single by Lartiste and Karol G

from the album Quartier latin vol. 1
- Language: Spanish and French
- Released: 31 January 2019
- Recorded: 2018
- Genre: French pop
- Length: 3:46
- Label: NuDeal Records
- Songwriter(s): Lartiste; Karol G

Lartiste singles chronology
"Mafiosa" (2018)	"Peligrosa" (2019)	"Code illimité" (2019)

Karol G singles chronology
"Secreto" (2018)	"Peligrosa" (2019)	"China" (2019)

Music video
- "Peligrosa" on YouTube

Peligrosa is a song of the Moroccan singer Lartiste and the Colombian singer Karol G, it was recorded in 2018 and was released in 31 January 2019 in YouTube, has of April 2020, the song has 27 million views.

== Charts ==
Chart (2019)	Peak position
France (SNEP)	94
