= Real Hasta la Muerte =

2018 studio album by Anuel AA

Studio album by Anuel AA
- Released: July 17, 2018
- Genres: Latin trap; reggaeton
- Length: 44:00
- Language: Spanish
- Label: Real Hasta la Muerte
- Producers: Chris Jedi; Gaby Music; JX "El Ingeniero"; Mando Fresh

Anuel AA chronology
| Real Hasta la Muerte (2018) | Emmanuel (2020) |

Professional ratings
Review scores
| Source | Rating |
|---|---|
| AllMusic | 3.5/5 stars |

Real Hasta la Muerte (Spanish for "Real Until Death") is the debut studio album by Puerto Rican rapper Anuel AA. Released on July 17, 2018, under the label Real Hasta la Muerte, the album features 12 tracks, and features collaborations with urban artists such as Zion, Wisin, Ozuna and Ñengo Flow. It was released hours before Anuel AA left jail and on September 18, 2018, the RIAA certified Real Hasta la Muerte Platinum.

== Production ==
Anuel AA, working with "Joshi", conceived and recorded the entire album while he was in prison. Due to his imprisonment, he did not give any interviews about the project.

Although the singer's lawyer, Edwin Prado, had anticipated the media that his client kept working from prison to get a production, the exclusive that the album would be released on the day of Anuel AA's release from prison was published by Billboard, as well as a full interview with the singer. In the said interview with Billboard, Anuel AA told them that he knew "[Puerto Rican police] were going to send [him] to jail" and that they likely arrested him for his songs.

== Track listing ==
| No. | Title | Length |
|---|---|---|
| 1. | "Na' Nuevo" | 4:44 |
| 2. | "Quiere Beber" | 3:08 |
| 3. | "Hipócrita" (featuring Zion) | 3:13 |
| 4. | "Modo de Avión" | 3:41 |
| 5. | "Bandolera" | 3:11 |
| 6. | "Pensando en Ti" (featuring Wisin) | 3:00 |
| 7. | "Brindemos" (featuring Ozuna) | 3:37 |
| 8. | "Espina" | 3:19 |
| 9. | "Tú No Lo Amas" | 3:35 |
| 10. | "Naturaleza" | 3:36 |
| 11. | "Yeezy" (featuring Ñengo Flow) | 4:22 |
| 12. | "Te Necesito" | 3:56 |

== Charts ==
=== Weekly charts ===
| Chart (2018) | Peak position |
|---|---|
| Spanish Albums (Promusicae) | 69 |
| US Billboard 200 | 42 |
| US Top Latin Albums (Billboard) | 1 |
| US Latin Rhythm Albums (Billboard) | 1 |

=== Year-end charts ===
| Chart (2018) | Position |
|---|---|
| US Top Latin Albums (Billboard) | 9 |
| Chart (2019) | Position |
| US Top Latin Albums (Billboard) | 4 |
| Chart (2020) | Position |
| Spanish Albums (PROMUSICAE) | 96 |
| US Top Latin Albums (Billboard) | 21 |
| Chart (2021) | Position |
| US Top Latin Albums (Billboard) | 73 |

== Certifications ==
| Region | Certification | Certified units/sales |
|---|---|---|
| Italy (FIMI) | Gold | 25,000^{‡} |
| Spain (Promusicae) | Gold | 20,000^{‡} |
| United States (RIAA) | 6× Platinum (Latin) | 360,000^{‡} |
^{‡} Sales+streaming figures based on certification alone.
