= Emmanuel (album) =

2020 studio album by Anuel AA

Studio album by Anuel AA
- Released: May 29, 2020
- Genre: Latin trap; reggaeton
- Length: 88:39
- Language: Spanish
- Label: Real Hasta la Muerte; Sony Latin
- Producer: Chris Jedi; Gaby Music; Yampi; Frabián Elí; Fresh Ayr; Ovy on the Drums

Anuel AA chronology
Real Hasta la Muerte (2018)	Emmanuel (2020)	Los Dioses (2021)

Singles from Emmanuel
- 1. "Secreto" Released: January 15, 2019; 2. "China" Released: July 19, 2019

Emmanuel is the second studio album by Puerto Rican rapper Anuel AA, released on May 29, 2020. The 22-track double album features collaborations from Travis Barker, Tego Calderón, Bad Bunny, Enrique Iglesias, Farruko, Zion, Lil Wayne, Kendo Kaponi, Yandel, Ñengo Flow, Mariah Angeliq, Karol G, Daddy Yankee, Ozuna and J Balvin.

Professional ratings
Review scores
Source	Rating
AllMusic	4/5 stars

== Background ==
On May 27, 2020, Anuel AA announced and revealed the tracklist for Emmanuel. Anuel AA had originally planned to release the album in April, but postponed the date due to the COVID-19 pandemic. Regarding the title of the album, the artist explained, "It's my name and it means 'God with us'. I wanted the album to have that good vibe. It's my life, made into music".

On the day of the album's release, he promoted the album by launching three luxury yachts off the coast of Miami's Isle of Normandy neighborhood. Each yacht had the name Emmanuel written on the side and played his music at high volume. The rapper explained his promotional strategy by saying, "Everybody does their release party in a club. And with coronavirus? I wouldn't go to the club right now!".

== Reception ==
Suzy Exposito of Rolling Stone called the album "a sonic feast that every bit as show-stopping, however indulgent, as his fleet of party boats...Even in the most crowded of featured tracks, Anuel’s hardy baritone cuts right through, leaving in his wake the smallest glint of pop sparkle". Griselda Flores of Billboard opined that several of the collaboration choices were "surprising" and stated "Emmanuel is a versatile album that has fresh music for the clubs, the street life, and even sentimental bops."

== Commercial performance ==
Emmanuel debut at number eight on the US Billboard 200 dated June 16, 2020, earning 39,000 equivalent album units earned in the week ending June 4, according to Nielsen Music/MRC Data. Of Emmanuel's starting count, 3,000 were in album sales and the bulk of the remainder attributed to streams. It registered 36,000 SEA units, equating to 55.8 million on-demand streams for the album's songs in its opening week.

Also, the album debut at number one on the US Top Latin Albums and Latin Rhythm Albums, becoming his second album to top both charts. With 39,000 units, Emmanuel net the third biggest debut of 2020 for a Latin album in terms of overall units. Of the 22 tracks 14 debuts on the Hot Latin Songs chart two of them in the top 10. It was the second Best Selling Latin Album in the United States with 411,000 equivalent album units.

The album also debut at the top of the Spanish Albums Chart and at the top 20 in Italy and Switzerland. Emmanuel was Anuel AA first album to debut in the Canadian Album Charts.

== Track listing ==
Disc 1 track listing
No.	Title	Writer(s)	Producer(s)	Length
1.	"No Llores Mujer" (with Travis Barker)	Emmanuel Gazmey	José Gazmey; Travis Barker	3:33
2.	"Somo o No Somos"	Gazmey	Chris Jedi; Gaby Music	3:57
3.	"Reggaetonera"	Gazmey; Steven Dominguez; Bryan Taveras	Chris Jedi; Gaby Music	3:36
4.	"Jangueo" (with Tego Calderón)	Gazmey; Tegui Calderón	Chris Jedi; Gaby Music	3:51
5.	"Hasta Que Dios Diga" (with Bad Bunny)	Gazmey; Benito Martínez	Dímelo Ninow; Chris Jedi; Gaby Music	4:06
6.	"Narcos"	Gazmey	Kavy Kali; Chris Jedi; Gaby Music	4:20
7.	"Fútbol y Rumba" (featuring Enrique Iglesias)	Gazmey; Iglesias	Ovy on the Drums	3:41
8.	"Que Se Joda" (with Farruko and Zion)	Gazmey; Joseph Vélez; Carlos Reyes; Félix Torres	Alex Killer; Dulce como Candy; Dímelo Ninow; Chris Jedi; Gaby Music; Ecby	3:46
9.	"Ferrari" (with Lil Wayne)	Gazmey; Dwayne Carter	Maximum; Chris Jedi	3:08
10.	"El Manual"	Gazmey	Ovy on the Drums	3:30

Disc 2 track listing
No.	Title	Writer(s)	Producer(s)	Length
11.	"Antes y Después" (with Kendo Kaponi and Yandel featuring Ñengo Flow)	Gazmey; José Morales; Llandel Veguilla; Edwin Vázquez	GloryGainz; Priority Beats; Fresh Ayr	6:54
12.	"¿Los Hombres No Lloran?"	Emmanuel Gazmey Santiago; Jose Alberto Robles; Juan Miguel Rubiera; Martin Rodriguez Vicente	Brasa; Rubiel; Shine; Karloff; Frabián Elí; Kairo la Sinfonía; Cromo X	3:09
13.	"Así Soy Yo" (with Bad Bunny)	Gazmey; Martínez	Dulce como Candy; Dímelo Ninow; Chris Jedi; Gaby Music	3:46
14.	"El Problema"	Gazmey	Dulce como Candy; Dímelo Ninow; Chris Jedi; Gaby Music	3:28
15.	"Bandido" (with Mariah Angeliq)	Gazmey; Mariah Pérez	Chris Jedi; Gaby Music	3:42
16.	"Rifles Rusos" (with Tego Calderón)	Gazmey; Calderón	Yampi	4:21
17.	"Mi Vieja"	Gazmey; Rafael López	Chris Jedi; Gaby Music	3:55
18.	"Nubes Negras"	Daniel Mizrahi; Emmanuel Gazmey; Frabian Eli Carrion; Juan Camilo Vargas Vasquez; Justin Devries; Kevyn Mauricio Cruz Moreno; Max Borghetti; Stefan G. Schonewille	Keityn; Pacific; Mantra	4:28
19.	"Tocándote"	Gazmey	Haze	3:50
20.	"Estrés Postraumático"	Gazmey; Rubén Blades	Ovy on the Drums	4:17

Disc 2 Bonus Tracks track listing
No.	Title	Writer(s)	Producer(s)	Length
21.	"Secreto" (with Karol G)	Gazmey; Carolina Giraldo; Henry Prida; Ezequiel Rivera	Prida; EZ Made da Beat	4:18
22.	"China" (with Daddy Yankee and Karol G featuring Ozuna and J Balvin)	Gazmey; Ramón Ayala; Giraldo; Juan Carlos Ozuna; José Osorio	Tainy	5:01

Notes

- In the CD version, "Antes y Después" and "Estrés Postraumático" are switched.

== Awards and nominations ==
Awards and nominations for Emmanuel
Year	Ceremony	Category	Result
2020	21st Annual Latin Grammy Awards	Best Urban Music Album	Nominated

== Charts ==
=== Weekly charts ===
Weekly chart performance for Emmanuel
Chart (2020)	Peak position
Belgian Albums (Ultratop Wallonia)	194
Canadian Albums (Billboard)	64
Finnish Albums (Suomen virallinen lista)	29
French Albums (SNEP)	141
Italian Albums (FIMI)	14
Spanish Albums (PROMUSICAE)	1
Swiss Albums (Schweizer Hitparade)	15
US Billboard 200	8
US Top Latin Albums (Billboard)	1
US Latin Rhythm Albums (Billboard)	1

=== Year-end charts ===
Year-end chart performance for Emmanuel
Chart (2020)	Position
Spanish Albums (PROMUSICAE)	4
US Billboard 200	152
US Top Latin Albums (Billboard)	3
Chart (2021)	Position
Spanish Albums (PROMUSICAE)	21
US Top Latin Albums (Billboard)	9
Chart (2022)	Position
Spanish Albums (PROMUSICAE)	59
US Top Latin Albums (Billboard)	24

== Certifications ==
Certifications for Emmanuel
Region	Certification	Certified units/sales
Italy (FIMI)	Platinum	50,000^{‡}
Mexico (AMPROFON)	Platinum	60,000^{‡}
Spain (Promusicae)	Platinum	40,000^{‡}
United States (RIAA)	6× Platinum (Latin)	360,000^{‡}
^{‡} Sales+streaming figures based on certification alone.

== See also ==
- 2020 in Latin music
- List of number-one Billboard Latin Albums from the 2020s
