= Narcos (Anuel AA song) =

Song by Anuel AA

from the album Emmanuel
- Language: Spanish
- Released: May 29, 2020
- Genre: Latin trap
- Length: 4:20
- Label: Real Hasta la Muerte
- Songwriter: Emmanuel Gazmey
- Producers: Chris Jedi; Gaby Music; Frabian Eli

Music video
- "Narcos" on YouTube

"Narcos" is a song by Puerto Rican rapper Anuel AA. It was released on May 29, 2020, through Real Hasta la Muerte and Sony Latin as a track on his second studio album Emmanuel. A video was released on June 26, 2020.

== Background ==
Previously, the song was previewed by Anuel AA multiple times in April, 2020. On May 27, 2021, Anuel AA announced his second studio album Emmanuel, and "Narcos" was included as the eight track.

== Commercial performance ==
"Narcos" debuted and peaked at number 13 on the Billboard Hot Latin Songs dated June 13, 2020. The song also debuted at number 25 on Spain's official chart dated May 29, 2020, before reaching its peak at number 15 in its third week on the chart.

== Music video ==
The video was released on June 26, 2020. It was produced by Fernando Lugo and has received over 200 million views on YouTube. It was directed by Mike Ho, with studio parts and outdoor parts, in which Anuel teaches his fans to do the famous choreography "El Baile del Dinero".

== Charts ==
=== Weekly charts ===
Chart (2020)	Peak position
Spain (PROMUSICAE)	15
US Hot Latin Songs (Billboard)	13

=== Year-end charts ===
Chart (2020)	Position
US Hot Latin Songs (Billboard)	71

== Certifications ==
Region	Certification	Certified units/sales
Spain (PROMUSICAE)	Platinum	40,000^{‡}
^{‡} Sales+streaming figures based on certification alone.
