= Baccarat (song) =

Song by Ozuna

from the album Cosmo
- Language: Spanish
- Released: November 17, 2023
- Genre: Reggaeton
- Length: 3:17
- Label: Aura Music; Sony Music Latin
- Songwriters: Jan Carlos Ozuna Rosado: Carlos Enrique Ortiz Rivera; Juan Gabriel Rivera Vazquez; Orlando Aponte Ortiz; Jesus Manuel Benitez Hiraldo
- Producers: Chris Jedi; Gaby Music

Visualizer
- "Baccarat" on YouTube

"Baccarat" is a song by Puerto Rican singer Ozuna. It was released on November 17, 2023, through Aura Music and Sony Music Latin as the second track of his sixth studio solo album Cosmo.

== Background and release ==
The song was previewed multiple times by Ozuna before its release. After releasing his single "El Plan", Ozuna announced his album Cosmo, and "Baccarat" was included as the second track. The song was produced by Chris Jedi and Gaby Music.

== Commercial performance ==
"Baccarat" peaked at number one on the Billboard Latin Airplay and on the Billboard Latin Rhythm Airplay chart dated March 30, 2024.

On the Monitor Latino's chart, the song peaked at number one in Argentina, Bolivia, Colombia, Ecuador, Peru, Paraguay and Uruguay.

== Audio visualizer ==
An audio visualizer was uploaded to YouTube on November 17, 2023 along with the other song audio visualizers that appeared on Cosmo.

== Charts ==
Chart performance for "Baccarat"
Chart (2023)	Peak position
Argentina (Monitor Latino)	1
Bolivia (Monitor Latino)	1
Chile (Monitor Latino)	2
Colombia (Monitor Latino)	1
Ecuador (Monitor Latino)	1
Peru (Monitor Latino)	1
Panama Urbano (Monitor Latino)	18
Paraguay (Monitor Latino)	1
Puerto Rico (Monitor Latino)	2
Uruguay (Monitor Latino)	1
US Latin Airplay (Billboard)	1
US Latin Rhythm Airplay (Billboard)	1
