= Adictiva =

Single by Daddy Yankee and Anuel AA

from the album El Disco Duro
- Language: Spanish
- English title: "Addictive"
- Released: November 9, 2018
- Genre: Reggaeton
- Length: 3:27
- Label: El Cartel
- Songwriters: Alonso Catalino Curet, Emmanuel Gazmey, Daddy Yankee, Carlos E. Ortiz Rivera, Vazquez Juan G Rivera

Daddy Yankee singles chronology
"Como Soy" (2018)	"Adictiva" (2018)	"Con Calma" (2019)

"Adictiva" is a song by Puerto Rican rappers Daddy Yankee and Anuel AA. It was released through El Cartel Records on November 9, 2018, and reached the top five in Spain and the top 10 on the US Hot Latin Songs chart. After announcing the song, the music video was released hours later on November 7, 2018, preceding the song's release to streaming platforms.

== Critical reception ==
Rolling Stone noted that the song attempts to "channel" the track "Te Boté".

== Charts ==
=== Weekly charts ===
Chart (2018–2019)	Peak position
Argentina (Argentina Hot 100)	5
Chile (Monitor Latino)	16
Colombia (National-Report)	34
Dominican Republic (Monitor Latino)	1
Honduras (Monitor Latino)	9
Mexican Pop Airplay (Billboard)	38
Nicaragua (Monitor Latino)	8
Paraguay (Monitor Latino)	14
Puerto Rico (Monitor Latino)	1
Spain (Promusicae)	4
US Bubbling Under Hot 100 (Billboard)	20
US Hot Latin Songs (Billboard)	10
US Latin Airplay (Billboard)	7
US Latin Rhythm Airplay (Billboard)	5
Venezuela (National-Report)	26

=== Year-end charts ===
Chart (2019)	Position
US Hot Latin Songs (Billboard)	25

== Certifications ==
Region	Certification	Certified units/sales
Spain (Promusicae)	3× Platinum	180,000^{‡}
^{‡} Sales+streaming figures based on certification alone.

== See also ==
- List of Billboard Argentina Hot 100 top-ten singles in 2019
