= Anuel AA =

Puerto Rican rapper and singer (born 1992)

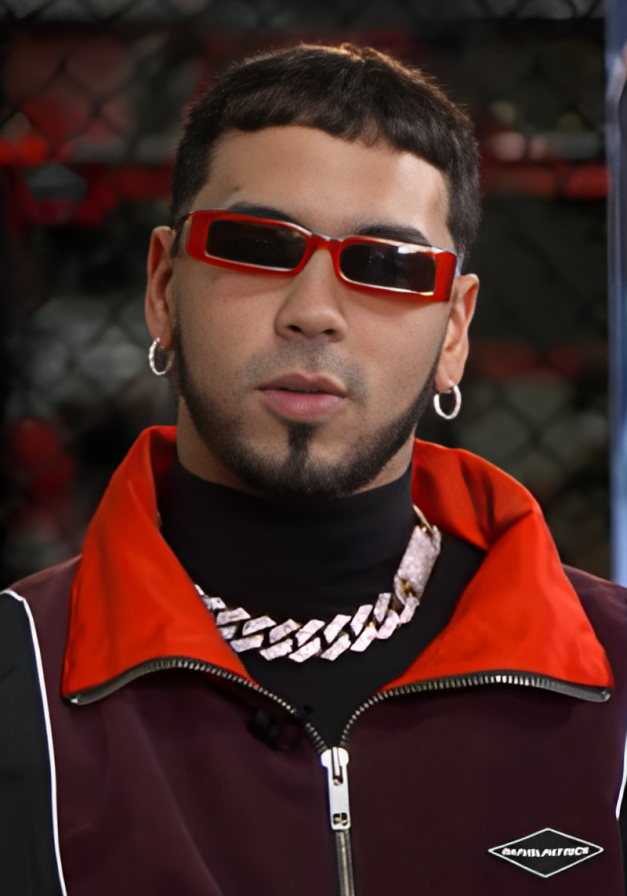
- Anuel AA in January 2022
- Born: Emmanuel Gazmey Santiago; November 26, 1992 (age 33); Carolina, Puerto Rico
- Other names: La 2blea; El Dios del Trap; El Rey del Trap
- Occupations: Rapper; singer; songwriter; producer
- Years active: 2010–present
- Spouses: Yailin La Más Viral (m. 2022; div. 2024)
- Partner: Laury Saavedra (2023–2026)
- Children: 4
- Musical career
- Genres: Reggaeton; Latin trap; Latin hip hop; R&B
- Labels: Real Hasta la Muerte; Sony Latin
- Website: www.anuelaa.com

Emmanuel Gazmey Santiago (born November 26, 1992), known professionally as Anuel AA, (Note: Pronounced as Doble A (Spanish for 'Double A').) is a Puerto Rican rapper and singer. Often dubbed as "The God of Latin trap" by himself and major Latin artists, his music often contains samples and interpolations of songs that were popular during his youth. He is seen as a controversial figure in the Latin music scene for his legal troubles and feuds with fellow Puerto Rican rappers Cosculluela, Ivy Queen, and Arcángel as well as American rapper 6ix9ine. Raised in Carolina, Puerto Rico, he started recording music at age fourteen and began posting it online four years later in 2014, before eventually signing to the Latin division of fellow American rapper Rick Ross's Maybach Music Group. His 2016 mixtape Real Hasta la Muerte was well-received, but his success was put on hold the same year by a 30-month prison sentence for illegal firearm possession in Puerto Rico. He recorded the entirety of his debut album while incarcerated, during which time his genre of music surged in popularity.

Anuel AA released his debut album, also titled Real Hasta la Muerte, on July 17, 2018, the day he was released from prison. The album was a critical and commercial success. In the coming six months, he appeared on the Billboard Hot Latin Songs, solidifying his position as one of the top Latino artists. In July 2019, he released the song "China", a collaboration with Daddy Yankee, Karol G, Ozuna, and J Balvin, which was a global success. He has since released the hit song "Me Gusta" with Shakira, and his second album, Emmanuel, which was released on May 29, 2020. In November, Anuel AA made a statement on Instagram and released a new song suggesting his imminent retirement from the music industry, citing family and relationship issues. He was back to music with his collaborative album Los Dioses with Ozuna. His third studio album Las Leyendas Nunca Mueren was released on November 26, 2021, including 16 tracks. His fourth studio album LLNM2 was the second part of "Las leyendas nunca mueren" and It was released on December 9, 2022.

== Early life ==
Anuel AA grew up in Carolina, Puerto Rico. His father is Afro–Puerto Rican and his mother is of White Puerto Rican descent; Anuel AA has stated that he has experienced racism since childhood for being mixed-race. His father, José Gazmey, was vice president of the Puerto Rican division of Sony Music Entertainment's A&R department. When Anuel AA was a child, his father worked in the studio with salsa artists such as Héctor Lavoe and Fania All-Stars. While he does not identify as a fan of the salsa genre, Anuel AA recalls that seeing his father interact with these artists inspired an interest in the recording industry. However, his father lost his job when Anuel AA was fifteen years old; this led him to become what Rolling Stone magazine described as a "son of the streets".

He idolized Tupac Shakur while growing up and aspired to emulate his style of dress, particularly his emphasis on jewelry. He is childhood friends with Puerto Rican rapper Casper Mágico, who co-wrote, and performed on the track "Te Boté". Speaking about how his upbringing in the projects influenced his music, Anuel AA stated, "My music is my soul speaking, literally. It's spiritual. It has a lot of feelings, a lot of pain. It's my experiences growing up en la calle [in the streets]."

== Career ==
=== Early career ===
Anuel AA began recording music at age fourteen, and started posting it online at age 18 in 2010. His music garnered millions of streams and views and eventually caught the attention of American rapper Rick Ross, who signed him to the Latin division of Maybach Music Group. His mixtape Real Hasta la Muerte was released in February 2016 and received positive reviews from critics. The success of this mixtape lead to Anuel AA landing a guest feature on Ozuna's 2017 album Odisea.

=== 2016–2018: Incarceration and Real Hasta la Muerte album ===
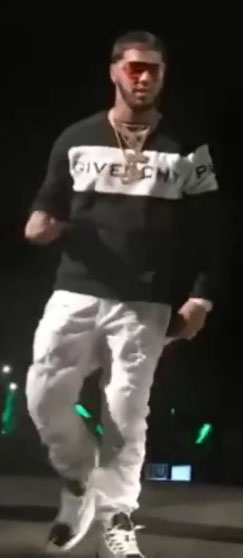
Anuel AA performing in 2018

In April 2016, Anuel AA was arrested in Guaynabo, Puerto Rico, and sentenced to 30 months in federal prison for illegal possession of three firearms. Billboard noted that Latin trap surged in popularity while Anuel AA was in prison, writing, "Anuel remained behind bars, while outside, his music flourished." After being arrested and imprisoned, he recorded his debut album while incarcerated. He did this by primarily recording his vocals over the phone and taking advantage of his mandatory stay at a Miami halfway house to complete the album.

He released his debut album Real Hasta la Muerte on July 17, 2018, the day he was released from prison. Rolling Stone included it on its list of Best Latin Albums of 2018, noting that the artist "demonstrates impressive pop instincts" and further commented, "As Anuel keeps one foot in trap, he's also looking toward Latin pop's mainstream". Real Hasta la Muerte peaked at number 42 on the Billboard 200 and topped the US Top Latin Albums chart. The release of the album, along with the artist's release from prison, garnered significant media attention; the rapper was surprised by the public response and stated that he "didn't even know how to talk in interviews" after being incarcerated for more than two years. He achieved his first Billboard Hot 100 hit in August 2018 through his collaboration with American rapper 6ix9ine on the song "Bebe".

In the six months following the release of Real Hasta la Muerte, Anuel AA contributed vocals to eleven Billboard Hot Latin Songs-charting singles, including "Ella Quiere Beber" with American singer Romeo Santos. He also collaborated with Nicki Minaj and Bantu on the song "Familia" for the Spider-Man: Into the Spider-Verse soundtrack, released in December 2018. In January 2019, the rapper released the single "Secreto" with Colombian singer Karol G, confirming the romantic relationship between the two artists in the song's accompanying music video. The single reached number 68 on the Billboard Hot 100 and number five on the US Hot Latin Songs charts. The song was inspired by the time when Anuel AA and Karol G were dating but had not yet publicly discussed their relationship. The video's "power couple" aesthetic garnered comparisons to Beyoncé and Jay-Z as well as Jennifer Lopez and Marc Anthony.

=== 2019–2020: "China" success and Emmanuel ===
In July 2019, Anuel AA released "China", a collaboration with Daddy Yankee, Karol G, Ozuna, and J Balvin. The song heavily samples Shaggy's 2000 single, "It Wasn't Me", a track Anuel AA remembered from his childhood, which he selected from a number of old songs he had been listening to with the intention of "redo[ing] a classic". He told XXL that "when I used to go with the big boys in my hood to the club, they put that song on and everybody used to go crazy". "China" debuted at number two on Billboard's Hot Latin Songs chart and topped both the Latin Digital Songs and Latin Streaming Songs charts with 1,000 downloads sold and 14.1 million streams, while the accompanying video was included on the Rolling Stone list of the 10 Best Latin Music Videos of July. Anuel AA later appeared on the single "Whine Up" from Nicky Jam's album Íntimo, released on November 1, 2019.

In January 2020, Anuel AA collaborated with Shakira on the song "Me Gusta", which interpolates Jamaican reggae band Inner Circle's 1992 hit "Sweat (A La La La La Long)". Rolling Stone called the song "an unhurried lover's rock number with a delicate touch of dembow". He featured on Bad Bunny's 2020 album YHLQMDLG on the song "Está Cabrón Ser Yo". On April 3, 2020, Anuel AA released "3 de Abril" which commemorates the day that the artist was arrested, leading to prison time. The song reflects on his troubled youth and the challenges he faced while incarcerated. Suzy Exposito of Rolling Stone called the track a "sobering commemoration". Also in April 2020, Anuel AA released the single and video for "Follow" with Karol G, recording it entirely while in quarantine in Miami due to the COVID-19 pandemic.

On May 27, 2020, he announced and revealed the tracklist for his second album, Emmanuel, which was released on May 29. Anuel AA had originally planned to release the album in April, but postponed the date due to the pandemic. On the day of the album's release, he promoted it by launching three luxury yachts off the coast of Miami's Isle of Normandy neighborhood. Each yacht had the name Emmanuel written on the side and played his music at high volume. The rapper explained his promotional strategy by saying, "Everybody does their release party in a club. And with coronavirus? I wouldn't go to the club right now!" The 22-track double album features collaborations from Bad Bunny, Enrique Iglesias, Travis Barker, Tego Calderón, Karol G, Lil Wayne, Farruko, Yandel and Ñengo Flow. Regarding the title of the album, the artist explained, "It's my name and it means 'God with us'. I wanted the album to have that good vibe. It's my life, made into music."

=== 2020 – mid 2021: Retirement comments and Los Dioses ===
In November 2020, Anuel AA indicated in an Instagram post that he was retiring from the music industry. On November 19, he released a new track, "Me Contagié 2", in which he talks about depression, indicates unhappiness with his relationships and expresses anguish at the fact that his career often takes him away from his young son, who has asked him to retire. He closes the song with the statement "In these Grammys, I retire". The comments have left his fans in a state of confusion about his future plans, as it appears that he has yet to make a more formal announcement of retirement.

On January 22, 2021, Anuel AA and Ozuna released their collaborative album Los Dioses. The album includes 12 tracks.

In June 2021, Anuel AA's manager Frabián Elí announced that Anuel's fourth studio album will be released in July. The album will include trap and only two reggaeton songs. Later he announced via Instagram that the album wouldn't come yet. Anuel later appeared on the remix of the single "Mr Jones" from the deluxe of Pop Smoke's album Faith, released on July 31, 2021.

In August 2021, Anuel released two songs, "Los de Siempre" with Chris Jedi and "23 Preguntas", dedicated to his ex-girlfriend Karol G. In the music video of 23 Preguntas he announced the name of his next album Las Leyendas Nunca Mueren. In September he partnered with Jhayco in the track "Ley Seca" part of his album Timelezz.

In December 2021, Anuel became the first Latin artist to collaborate with UFC to promote a sports conceptual album, which features his admiration for influential cultural figures, including sports icons. Real Hasta la Muerte was the presenting sponsor of UFC Fight Replay for pivotal moments of UFC 269's main card. The company's activation with UFC included Anuel AA's visuals, logo, and artistic concept for his third album, Las Leyendas Nunca Mueren.

=== Late 2021: Las Leyendas Nunca Mueren ===
On September 22, he announced that his album Las Leyendas Nunca Mueren was complete and ready for release. In October he released "Dictadura", the first single of his upcoming album. In November, Anuel featured on the long-awaited BZRP Music Session 46 with Argentinian Producer Bizarrap. On November 11 he released the second single from the album, "Leyenda". On November 17 he revealed the tracklist for his album by printing song names on the jersey of his basketball team. The day after, he released the album's last single, "Súbelo", with Myke Towers and Jhayco. Las Leyendas Nunca Mueren released on the rapper's 29th birthday. The album has 16 tracks and features Eladio Carrión, Mora, Myke Towers and Jhayco.

=== 2022: LLNM2 ===
On January 1, 2022, Anuel AA took part of Dominican rapper Rochy RD's song "Los Illuminaty". Later he confirmed the announcement of the second part of his album Las Leyendas Nunca Mueren. The first single of the new project is supposed to be "Si Tú Me Busca" with Dominican rapper Yailin La Más Viral. On 20 May 2022, Anuel AA partnered with Chris Jedi, Chencho Corleone and Ñengo Flow in global hit "La Llevo al Cielo". Later he released the electro pop song "¿Qué Nos Paso?".

Anuel AA announced the EP Me Fui de Gira with 6 or 7 tracks but later he cancelled it and unified it with the upcoming album Las Leyendas Nunca Mueren 2. The first announced single in the project was the collaboration "Malo" between Anuel and Puerto Rican singer Zion and Puerto Rican rapper Randy.

On February 18, 2022, Anuel participated in the 2022 NBA All-Star Celebrity Game.

=== 2023: Rompecorazones ===
In early 2023, Anuel AA announced his tour in the United States, named "Legends Never Die Tour". In the promotional video he also confirmed his upcoming extended play Rompecorazones.

On March 2, 2023, Anuel AA released the single "Más Rica Que Ayer" alongside Puerto Rican producer duo Mambo Kingz and Puerto Rican producer DJ Luian. It became popular and the music video has received over 275 million views on YouTube. Later he partnered with Maluma in the song "Diablo, Que Chimba". In April 2023, Anuel AA collaborated with Eladio Carrión on the long-awaited track "Triste Verano". Later he released "Mi Exxx", a collaboration with Wisin.

On May 5, 2023, Anuel AA released the single "Mejor Que Yo" with DJ Luian and Mambo Kingz, dedicated to his ex-girlfriend Karol G. In July 2023, Anuel AA featured on Rochy RD's song "Milloneta", previously performed by both artists at the 2023 Heat Latin Music Awards in Dominican Republic. On May 28, 2023, Anuel AA partnered with Jay Wheeler on the remix of "Pacto" alongside Hades66, Dei V and Bryant Myers.

In October 2023, Anuel AA postponed the release of his upcoming EP “Rompecorazones”, which was supposed to be released at the end of the month, due to an unexpected emergency surgery. Later he released the single "OA" with Spanish rapper Quevedo and Maluma featuring Mambo Kingz and DJ Luian. In November 2023, he collaborated with Ozuna on the track "Pa Ti Estoy", part of Ozuna's album Cosmo. In December 2023, Anuel AA released the single "Luces Tenues", produced by DJ Luian and Mambo Kingz.

=== 2024: Two new albums ===
In the beginning of 2024, Ozuna revealed that an album between him and Anuel AA is scheduled to be released following their collaborative album Los Dioses. Later Anuel AA announced in a live with Adin Ross on Kick that his upcoming album Rompecorazones is on the way. In February 2024, Anuel AA alongside Ozuna featured on the single "Bad Boy" by Chris Jedi, Gaby Music and Dei V. Later he appeared on the deluxe edition of Jennifer Lopez's album This Is Me... Now in the remix of "Rebound". At the same time Anuel released his single "Tacos Gucci", part of his upcoming album Rompecorazones. In March 2024, he took part of the remix of Pressure 9X19's "VVS Switch" alongside Puerto Rican rappers YOVNGCHIMI, Hades66, Luar La L and CDobleta.

In late March 2024, Anuel AA and Jhayco joined Puerto Rican rapper iZaak for the remix of "Bby Boo". Anuel AA and Bryant Myers appeared on the remix of "No Te Quieren Conmigo", released on April 4, 2024, alongside Gaby Music, Lunay and Luar La L. In mid-April 2024, Anuel AA confirmed that he will release two albums this year. On April 19, 2024, Anuel AA partnered with Brytiago in a collaboration titled "Kilerito". On May 3, 2024, Anuel AA participated on Casper Magico, Luar La L and iZaak's single "Toki". In late-June, 2024, he participated alongside Blessd and Pirlo on WYA (Remix Black and White) by J Abdiel and iZaak. Later, Anuel AA released "Razones" with Ozuna featuring DJ Luian and Mambo Kingz. In July, collaborations with Yovngchimi ("Baby Demon") and Omar Courtz ("Serio con ese Q") came out.

On August 30, 2024, Anuel AA released the song "Shampoo de Coco".

On November 14, 2024, Anuel AA released the song "DEPORTIVO" alongside Blessd.

On December 25, 2024, Anuel AA featured on "Popa (Remix)" alongside Ice Spice for the album Y2K: I'm Just A Girl (Deluxe).

== Musical style and influences ==
"China" (2019)
This song, which samples the melody of Shaggy's hit "It Wasn't Me" (2000), debuted at number two on Billboard's Hot Latin Songs chart.

"Medusa" (2020)
"Medusa", a collaboration with Jhayco and J Balvin, demonstrates Anuel AA's use of the "BRRR" adlib and contains elements of Latin trap.

According to XXL, Anuel AA is considered "one of the founding fathers of Latin trap music". He is noted for his signature "BRRR" adlib, which is meant to mimic the sound of an automatic firearm. Anuel AA's lyrics often discuss sex, crime, and life on the streets. Paul Simpson of AllMusic described his lyrics as "too risqué to be played on the radio" and highlighted that his success has instead stemmed from streaming services and the artist's highly active social media presence. Gary Suarez of Vice viewed his 2018 album Real Hasta la Muerte as a collection of both "gleaming trap bangers" and "reggaeton crowd pleasers". Despite his "bad guy image", Suarez wrote that the relationship-themed songs "Culpables" and "Secreto" represent "a softening of his hardened trapero persona". Anuel AA is noted for his use of the word "bebecita" ("baby girl") in songs and on social media, and the word has become associated with the reggaeton genre as well as Anuel AA and Karol G's relationship.

Anuel AA's introduction to hip hop occurred upon listening to rapper Tupac Shakur. His songs frequently pay homage to both U.S. and Latin artists that influenced him in his youth. Examples include "China" which samples both "It Wasn't Me" by Shaggy and "Ella Me Levantó" by Daddy Yankee, and "Delincuente" which interpolates "Bandoleros" by Don Omar and Tego Calderón. He is influenced by, and has collaborated with, American hip hop artists Meek Mill and Gucci Mane, both of whom, like Anuel AA, gained notoriety for serving time in prison. Describing Meek Mill's impact on his music, Anuel AA explained, "I listen to what people say in the songs, not just the melodies. With rappers you gotta listen to what they say. And Meek be talking some real shit. That's why I look up to him." In an interview with Vice, he expressed admiration for the music of bachata artist Zacarías Ferreíra, Dominican rapper el Alfa, and English singer-songwriter Ed Sheeran. He has also indicated an interest in collaborating with Post Malone and Billie Eilish.

== Controversies ==
On September 15, 2018, Anuel AA released a diss track called "Intocable" aimed at fellow rapper Cosculluela. The track was widely criticized due to its profanity and remarks about homosexuality and HIV/AIDS patients. In the song, he refers to model and television host La Taína as a "pig" for her HIV-positive status. Due to the public backlash, Anuel AA's concert at the Coliseo de Puerto Rico venue, scheduled for October 12 of that year, was canceled by his production staff and main producer Paco López. Anuel AA later issued an apology for the song. He explained, "It is the worst mistake of my career. I do not need this and I apologize to all the people I offended. To homosexuals, to people with AIDS, to La Taína [the model] and to those who lost everything after Hurricane Maria ... My fans deserve from me to be a better person, and I apologize to everyone in Puerto Rico."

In early April 2019, Anuel AA and Ivy Queen engaged in an argument on Instagram after Anuel AA questioned how Ivy Queen could be still considered the "Queen of Reggaeton". Anuel argued she hadn't had a hit song in more than 7 years, and further questioned if Karol G should be considered another "Queen of Reggaeton". Followers on Instagram speculated about why he made the comments. Ivy Queen responded with comments about where she came from and how she was a pioneer, paving the way for other women to follow.

In December 2023, a feud against Anuel AA and Arcángel would start after the latter released "Feliz Navidad 8", which is a diss track against Anuel, Rochy RD and Ozuna. The possible reason for the release of track is due to Anuel ending his business relationship with his longtime manager Frabián Eli, who is Arcángel's brother-in-law. Anuel responded with the release of the diss track "Glock, Glock, Glock", where he mentions that without Bad Bunny, Arcángel cannot make a hit single. Arcángel responded again with another diss track, "El Narcan", which is titled after the substance of the same name. The lyrics claim that Anuel has substance abuse issues. Anuel responded again with a second diss track "Arcángel Es Chota", a song where Karol G and Cosculluela are again mentioned and, in the lyrics, mentions Arcángel's arrest in 2019 for domestic battery. Also responding to Arcángel again through an Instagram post, Anuel claims that nobody noticed that he released his album, Sentimiento, Elegancia y Más Maldad, adding that "[he's] waiting for Bad Bunny to collaborate with him to revive his career." Arcángel would release a third diss track titled "3 a 0", where he mentions Anuel's ex-wife Yailin La Más Viral and defends Karol G and Feid in the track.

== Personal life ==
=== Relationships ===
Anuel AA has a son named Pablo Anuel, a daughter named Gianella, and a daughter with his ex-wife, Yailin La Más Viral, named Cattleya.

Anuel AA met Colombian singer Karol G in August 2018 on the set of the music video for their song "Culpables", a month after his release from prison. In January 2019, Anuel AA and Karol G confirmed their relationship. On April 25, 2019, Karol G arrived at the Billboard Latin Music Awards wearing a "massive" diamond ring, confirming the couple's engagement. In March 2021, it was reported that the couple ended their relationship after two years of dating.

In early 2022, Gazmey confirmed his relationship with Dominican rapper Yailin La Más Viral. In June 2022, the couple got married. In February 2023, the couple announced their separation. In March 2023, Yailin gave birth to his daughter Cattelaya. As of mid 2023, Anuel has been dating Venezuelan Laury Saavedra. In 2024, they announced via Instagram that they were expecting their first child together and it was revealed to be a girl. On January 23, 2025, Anuel AA became a father for the fourth time, a daughter with Laury Saavedra.

=== Politics ===
Anuel AA supported Donald Trump's 2024 presidential campaign and spoke at a campaign rally in Johnstown, Pennsylvania.

=== Legal issues ===
Anuel AA was arrested and held in the Metropolitan Detention Center, Guaynabo, on April 3, 2016, with three companions when police found three pistols including one stolen, nine magazines, and 152 bullets. He signed a plea deal, accepting a 30-month sentence in federal prison, on gun possession charges. Following his arrest, the #FreeAnuel movement became popular among his fans as he continued to release tracks from prison by recording his voice over the phone.

While incarcerated, Anuel AA spent 90 days in solitary confinement following an incident with another inmate. During his trial, he stated that the lyrics in his music did not represent his true character. The presiding judge Aida Delgado-Colón said she had never heard any of his songs. In March 2018, Anuel AA was released from federal prison into a state prison in Miami. During this time, he told Billboard that while imprisoned, he listened to the radio and kept up with what was happening in the streets to draw inspiration for his songwriting. Anuel also claims that during his time in prison he started reading the Bible for the first time and realizing that “his talent and blessings came from God”.

=== NFTs ===
On June 10, 2022, it was reported that Anuel AA would be entering the NFT space by launching his own NFT collection making him one of the first Latin rappers in history to do so. He is also the first Latin artist to collaborate with the UFC promoting a sports conceptual album.

The rapper's NFT collection will be made up of physical assets along with exclusive real life experiences such as limited edition merchandise, access to album release parties, studio visits and listening sessions.

== Discography ==
Solo studio albums

- Real Hasta la Muerte (2018)
- Emmanuel (2020)
- Las Leyendas Nunca Mueren (2021)
- LLNM2 (2022)
- Real Hasta La Muerte 2 (2026)
- Cartel Real Hasta La Muerte (2026)

Collaborative studio albums

- Los Dioses (with Ozuna, 2021)

== Tours ==
- Real Hasta la Muerte Tour (2018–2019)
- Culpables Tour (with Karol G) (2019)
- Emmanuel Tour (2019–2020)
- Las Leyendas Nunca Mueren Tour (2022–2023) (Note: The tour was titled Legends Never Die Tour in English-speaking countries.)
- Rompecorazones Tour (2023)
- Europe Tour (2024)
- Real Hasta la Muerte 2 Tour (2024–2025)

== Filmography ==
Film and television roles
Year	Title	Role	Notes	Ref.
2021–2022	30 Days with: Anuel	Himself	YouTube Originals	

== Awards and nominations ==
Award	Year	Recipient(s) and nominee(s)	Category	Result	Ref.
American Music Awards	2020	Emmanuel	Favorite Album – Latin	Nominated	
Billboard Music Awards	2019	Himself	Top Latin Artist	Nominated	
Billboard Music Awards	2019	Real Hasta La Muerte	Top Latin Album	Nominated	
Billboard Music Awards	2020	Himself	Top Latin Artist	Nominated	
Billboard Music Awards	2020	"China"	Top Latin Song	Nominated	
Billboard Music Awards	2020	"Otro Trago (Remix)"	Top Latin Song	Nominated	
Billboard Music Awards	2021	Himself	Top Latin Artist	Nominated	
Billboard Music Awards	2021	Emmanuel	Top Latin Album	Nominated	
Billboard Latin Music Awards	2019	Himself	New Artist of the Year	Won	
Billboard Latin Music Awards	2019	Himself	Social Artist of the Year	Nominated	
Billboard Latin Music Awards	2019	Real Hasta La Muerte	Top Latin Album of the Year	Nominated	
Billboard Latin Music Awards	2019	Real Hasta La Muerte	Latin Rhythm Album of the Year	Nominated	
Billboard Latin Music Awards	2020	Himself	Social Artist of the Year	Nominated	
Billboard Latin Music Awards	2020	Himself	Male Hot Latin Songs Artist of the Year	Nominated	
Billboard Latin Music Awards	2020	"Otro Trago (Remix)"	Hot Latin Song of the Year	Nominated	
Billboard Latin Music Awards	2020	"Otro Trago (Remix)"	Vocal Event Hot Latin Song of the Year	Nominated	
Billboard Latin Music Awards	2020	"Otro Trago (Remix)"	Latin Rhythm Song of the Year	Nominated	
Billboard Latin Music Awards	2020	"Baila Baila Baila (Remix)"	Latin Rhythm Song of the Year	Nominated	
Billboard Latin Music Awards	2020	"Baila Baila Baila (Remix)"	Digital Song of the Year	Nominated	
Billboard Latin Music Awards	2020	"Baila Baila Baila (Remix)"	Airplay Song of the Year	Nominated	
Billboard Latin Music Awards	2020	"China"	Airplay Song of the Year	Nominated	
Billboard Latin Music Awards	2020	"Ella Quiere Beber (Remix)"	Streaming Song of the Year	Nominated	
Billboard Latin Music Awards	2020	"Otro Trago (Remix)"	Streaming Song of the Year	Nominated	
Billboard Latin Music Awards	2021	Himself	Artist of the Year	Nominated	
Billboard Latin Music Awards	2021	Himself	Male Hot Latin Songs Artist of the Year	Nominated	
Billboard Latin Music Awards	2021	Himself	Male Top Latin Albums Artist of the Year	Nominated	
Billboard Latin Music Awards	2021	Himself	Latin Rhythm Artist of the Year	Nominated	
Billboard Latin Music Awards	2021	Himself	Songwriter of the Year	Nominated	
Billboard Latin Music Awards	2021	Emmanuel	Top Latin Album of the Year	Nominated	
Billboard Latin Music Awards	2021	Emmanuel	Latin Rhythm Album of the Year	Nominated	
Billboard Latin Music Awards	2021	"Me Gusta"	Latin Pop Song of the Year	Nominated	
Billboard Latin Music Awards	2022	Himself	Top Latin Albums Artist of the Year, Male	Nominated	
Billboard Latin Music Awards	2023	LLNM2	Latin Rhythm Album of the Year	Nominated	
ASCAP Latin Music Awards	2020	"Adictiva"	Winning Songs	Won	
ASCAP Latin Music Awards	2020	"Amanece"	Winning Songs	Won	
ASCAP Latin Music Awards	2020	"Bubalu"	Winning Songs	Won	
ASCAP Latin Music Awards	2020	"China"	Winning Songs	Won	
ASCAP Latin Music Awards	2020	"Secreto"	Winning Songs	Won	
ASCAP Latin Music Awards	2021	"Adicto"	Winning Songs	Won	
ASCAP Latin Music Awards	2021	"La Jeepeta (Remix)"	Winning Songs	Won	
ASCAP Latin Music Awards	2021	"Me Gusta"	Winning Songs	Won	
ASCAP Latin Music Awards	2021	"Te Quemaste"	Winning Songs	Won	
ASCAP Latin Music Awards	2022	"Reloj"	Winning Songs	Won	
ASCAP Latin Music Awards	2023	"Ley Seca"	Winning Songs	Won	
BMI Latin Awards	2020	"Adictiva"	Most-Performed Songs	Won	
BMI Latin Awards	2020	"Bebe"	Most-Performed Songs	Won	
BMI Latin Awards	2020	"Culpables"	Most-Performed Songs	Won	
BMI Latin Awards	2020	"Ella Quiere Beber"	Most-Performed Songs	Won	
BMI Latin Awards	2021	"Adicto"	Most-Performed Songs	Won	
BMI Latin Awards	2021	"Baila Baila Baila (Remix)"	Most-Performed Songs	Won	
BMI Latin Awards	2021	"China"	Most-Performed Songs	Won	
BMI Latin Awards	2021	"Ella Quiere Beber (Remix)"	Most-Performed Songs	Won	
BMI Latin Awards	2021	"Otro Trago (Remix)"	Most-Performed Songs	Won	
BMI Latin Awards	2021	"Secreto"	Most-Performed Songs	Won	
BMI Latin Awards	2022	"La Jeepeta (Remix)"	Most-Performed Songs	Won	
Latin Grammy Awards	2020	Himself	Best New Artist	Nominated	
Latin Grammy Awards	2020	"China"	Record of the Year	Nominated	
Latin Grammy Awards	2020	"China"	Best Urban Fusion/Performance	Nominated	
Latin Grammy Awards	2020	Emmanuel	Best Urban Music Album	Nominated	
Latin Grammy Awards	2020	"Narcos"	Best Rap/Hip Hop Song	Nominated	
Latin Grammy Awards	2020	"Medusa"	Best Rap/Hip Hop Song	Nominated	
Latin Grammy Awards	2020	"Adicto"	Best Urban Song	Nominated	
Latin American Music Awards	2019	Himself	Artist of the Year	Won	
Latin American Music Awards	2019	Himself	Favorite Male Artist	Won	
Latin American Music Awards	2019	Himself	Favorite Urban Artist	Won	
Latin American Music Awards	2019	Real Hasta La Muerte	Album of the Year	Won	
Latin American Music Awards	2019	Real Hasta La Muerte	Favorite Urban Album	Won	
Latin American Music Awards	2019	"Ella Quiere Beber (Remix)"	Song of the Year	Nominated	
Latin American Music Awards	2019	"Ella Quiere Beber (Remix)"	Favorite Urban Song	Nominated	
Latin American Music Awards	2021	Himself	Artist of the Year	Nominated	
Latin American Music Awards	2021	Himself	Favorite Male Artist	Nominated	
Latin American Music Awards	2021	Himself	Favorite Urban Artist	Nominated	
Latin American Music Awards	2021	Emmanuel	Album of the Year	Nominated	
Latin American Music Awards	2021	Emmanuel	Favorite Urban Album	Nominated	
Latin American Music Awards	2021	"Me Gusta"	Favorite Pop Song	Nominated	
Latin American Music Awards	2022	Himself	Favorite Urban Artist	Nominated	
Latin American Music Awards	2023	Himself	Favorite Urban Artist	Nominated	
Heat Latin Music Awards	2019	Himself	Best New Artist	Won	
Heat Latin Music Awards	2020	Himself	Best Male Artist	Nominated	
Heat Latin Music Awards	2020	Himself	Best Urban Artist	Nominated	
Heat Latin Music Awards	2020	"China"	Best Collaboration	Nominated	
Heat Latin Music Awards	2021	Himself	Best Urban Artist	Nominated	
Heat Latin Music Awards	2022	"Fiel (Remix)"	Best Collaboration	Nominated	
People's Choice Awards	2019	Himself	The Latin Artist of 2019	Nominated	
People's Choice Awards	2021	Himself	The Latin Artist of 2021	Nominated	
People's Choice Awards	2021	"Location"	The Music Video of 2021	Nominated	
LOS40 Music Awards	2021	"Location"	Best Video	Nominated	
Latin Music Italian Awards	2019	Himself	Best Latin Male Artist	Nominated	
Latin Music Italian Awards	2019	"China"	Best Latin Song	Nominated	
Latin Music Italian Awards	2019	"China"	Best Latin Male Video	Nominated	
MTV Europe Music Awards	2019	Himself	Best Caribbean Act	Won	
MTV Europe Music Awards	2020	Himself	Best Latin	Nominated	
MTV Europe Music Awards	2020	Himself	Best Caribbean Act	Nominated	
MTV Millennial Awards	2019	Himself	Viral Artist	Nominated	
MTV Millennial Awards	2019	"Secreto"	Hit of the Year	Nominated	
MTV Millennial Awards	2021	"Location"	Music-Ship of the Year	Nominated	
MTV Millennial Awards	2021	"Reloj"	Viral Anthem	Nominated	
MTV Video Music Awards	2019	"Secreto"	Best Latin	Nominated	
MTV Video Music Awards	2020	"China"	Best Latin	Nominated	
Premios Juventud	2019	Himself	Can't Get Enough... (Best Social Artist)	Nominated	
Premios Juventud	2019	Anuel and Karol G	Couples that Fire Up My Feed (Best Couple)	Won	
Premios Juventud	2019	"Adictiva"	Best Song: Can't Get Enough of This Song	Nominated	
Premios Juventud	2019	"Ella Quiere Beber (Remix)"	Best Song: Can't Get Enough of This Song	Nominated	
Premios Juventud	2019	"Ella Quiere Beber (Remix)"	Best Song: The Traffic Jam	Won	
Premios Juventud	2019	"Secreto"	Best Song: Singing in the Shower	Won	
Premios Juventud	2020	Himself	And Featuring...	Nominated	
Premios Juventud	2020	Anuel and Karol G	Together They Fire Up My Feed	Won	
Premios Juventud	2020	Gokú	#Pet Goals	Won	
Premios Juventud	2020	"Whine Up"	This Choreo Is On Fire	Nominated	
Premios Juventud	2020	"China"	The Traffic Jam	Won	
Premios Juventud	2020	"China"	The Perfect Mix	Won	
Premios Juventud	2020	"Me Gusta"	OMG Collaboration	Nominated	
Premios Juventud	2021	"Futbol y Rumba"	La Mezcla Perfecta (Song with the Best Collaboration)	Nominated	
Premios Juventud	2021	"La Jeepeta (Remix)"	Viral Track of the Year	Nominated	
Premios Juventud	2022	"Si Tú Me Busca"	Best Song by a Couple	Nominated	
Premios Juventud	2022	Anuel and Yailin La Más Viral	Best Social Media Power Couple	Nominated	
Premios Juventud	2023	"Mi Exxx"	Best Song for My Ex	Nominated	
Premios Juventud	2023	LLNM2	Best Urban Album – Male	Nominated	
Premios Juventud	2023	"Delicuente"	Best Dembow Collaboration	Won	
Premios Juventud	2023	"La 2Blea"	Best Trap Song	Nominated	
Premios Lo Nuestro	2019	Himself	Revelation Artist of the Year	Won	
Premios Lo Nuestro	2020	Himself	Social Artist of the Year	Won	
Premios Lo Nuestro	2020	"Baila Baila Baila (Remix)"	Remix of the Year	Nominated	
Premios Lo Nuestro	2020	"Otro Trago (Remix)"	Remix of the Year	Nominated	
Premios Lo Nuestro	2020	"Secreto"	Urban Collaboration of the Year	Won	
Premios Lo Nuestro	2020	"Delicuente"	Urban/Trap Song of the Year	Nominated	
Premios Lo Nuestro	2021	Himself	Male Urban Artist of the Year	Nominated	
Premios Lo Nuestro	2021	"Keii"	Song of the Year	Nominated	
Premios Lo Nuestro	2021	"Keii"	Urban Song of the Year	Nominated	
Premios Lo Nuestro	2021	"La Jeepeta (Remix)"	Remix of the Year	Won	
Premios Lo Nuestro	2021	"Me Gusta"	Urban/Pop Song of the Year	Nominated	
Premios Lo Nuestro	2021	"Medusa"	Urban/Trap Song of the Year	Nominated	
Premios Lo Nuestro	2021	"No Me Ame"	Urban/Trap Song of the Year	Nominated	
Premios Lo Nuestro	2022	"Fiel (Remix)"	Remix of the Year	Nominated	
Premios Lo Nuestro	2022	"Antes"	Urban Song of the Year	Nominated	
Premios Lo Nuestro	2022	"Antes"	Urban Collaboration of the Year	Nominated	
Premios Lo Nuestro	2022	"Location"	Urban Collaboration of the Year	Nominated	
Premios Lo Nuestro	2023	Las Leyendas Nunca Mueren	Urban Album of the Year	Nominated	
Premios Lo Nuestro	2024	"Podemos Repetirlo (Remix)"	Remix of the Year	Nominated	
Premios Lo Nuestro	2024	"Mi Exxx"	Urban Collaboration of the Year	Nominated	
Premios Lo Nuestro	2024	LLNM2	Urban Album of the Year	Nominated	
Premios Odeón	2020	Himself	Latin Odeon Artist	Nominated	
Premios Odeón	2021	Himself	Latin Odeon Artist	Nominated	
Premios Odeón	2022	Himself	Latin Odeon Artist	Nominated	
Premios Odeón	2022	Los Dioses	Best Latin Album	Nominated	
Premios Tu Música Urbano	2019	Himself	Artist of the Year	Nominated	
Premios Tu Música Urbano	2019	Himself	Urban Male Artist	Nominated	
Premios Tu Música Urbano	2019	"Asesina (Remix)"	Video of the Year	Nominated	
Premios Tu Música Urbano	2019	"Asesina (Remix)"	Remix of the Year	Nominated	
Premios Tu Música Urbano	2019	"Ella Quiere Beber (Remix)"	Remix of the Year	Nominated	
Premios Tu Música Urbano	2019	"Ella Quiere Beber (Remix)"	Song of the Year	Nominated	
Premios Tu Música Urbano	2019	"Ella Quiere Beber (Remix)"	Collaboration of the Year	Nominated	
Premios Tu Música Urbano	2019	"Culpables"	Collaboration of the Year	Nominated	
Premios Tu Música Urbano	2019	Real Hasta La Muerte	Álbum of the Year	Nominated	
Premios Tu Música Urbano	2020	Himself	Artist of the Year	Nominated	
Premios Tu Música Urbano	2020	Himself	Top Artist - Male	Nominated	
Premios Tu Música Urbano	2020	Himself	World Tour	Nominated	
Premios Tu Música Urbano	2020	"China"	Song of the Year	Nominated	
Premios Tu Música Urbano	2020	"China"	Collaboration of the Year	Won	
Premios Tu Música Urbano	2020	"Delicuente"	Collaboration of the Year	Nominated	
Premios Tu Música Urbano	2020	"Adicto"	Collaboration of the Year	Nominated	
Premios Tu Música Urbano	2020	"Adictiva"	Collaboration of the Year	Nominated	
Premios Tu Música Urbano	2020	"Verte Ir"	Collaboration of the Year	Nominated	
Premios Tu Música Urbano	2020	"Secreto"	Collaboration of the Year	Nominated	
Premios Tu Música Urbano	2020	"Ella Quiere Beber (Remix)"	Remix of the Year	Won	
Premios Tu Música Urbano	2020	"Otro Trago (Remix)"	Remix of the Year	Nominated	
Premios Tu Música Urbano	2020	"Gan-Ga (Remix)"	Remix of the Year	Nominated	
Premios Tu Música Urbano	2020	"Aventura"	Collaboration of the Year - New Generation	Nominated	
Premios Tu Música Urbano	2020	"Amanece"	Best Male Song	Nominated	
Premios Tu Música Urbano	2020	"China"	Video of the Year	Nominated	
Premios Tu Música Urbano	2020	"Adicto"	Video of the Year	Won	
Premios Tu Música Urbano	2020	Real Hasta La Muerte	Album of the Year - Male	Nominated	
Premios Tu Música Urbano	2022	Himself	Top Artist - Male	Nominated	
Premios Tu Música Urbano	2022	Himself	Top Social Artist	Nominated	
Premios Tu Música Urbano	2022	Himself	Top Artist - Trap	Nominated	
Premios Tu Música Urbano	2022	"Fiel (Remix)"	Remix of the Year	Nominated	
Premios Tu Música Urbano	2022	"Ley Seca"	Top Song - Pop Urban	Nominated	
Premios Tu Música Urbano	2022	"Los Illuminaty"	Top Song - Dembow	Nominated	
Premios Tu Música Urbano	2022	"Los De Siempre"	Top Song - Trap	Nominated	
Premios Tu Música Urbano	2022	"McGregor"	Video of the Year	Nominated	
Premios Tu Música Urbano	2022	Las Leyendas Nunca Mueren	Album of the Year - Male Artist	Nominated	
Premios Tu Música Urbano	2023	Himself	Top Artist - Male	Nominated	
Premios Tu Música Urbano	2023	Himself	Top Artist - Trap	Won	
Premios Tu Música Urbano	2023	"El Nene"	Top Song - Trap	Won	
Premios Tu Música Urbano	2023	"Diamantes En Mis Dientes"	Top Song - Trap	Nominated	
Premios Tu Música Urbano	2023	"Delincuente"	Top Song - Dembow	Nominated	
Premios Tu Música Urbano	2023	LLNM2	Album of the Year – Male Artist	Nominated	
Premios Tu Música Urbano	2023	"La Llevo al Cielo"	Video of the Year	Nominated	
Spotify Awards	2020	Himself	Most-Streamed Male Artist:	Nominated	
Spotify Awards	2020	Himself	Most-Added to Playlists Artist	Nominated	
Telehit Awards	2019	"China"	Best Urban Song	Nominated	
Telehit Awards	2019	"China"	Best Urban Video	Nominated	
Teen Choice Awards	2019	"Baila Baila Baila (Remix)"	Choice Latin Song	Nominated	
