= List of Billboard Latin Rhythm Airplay number ones of 2020 =

The Billboard Latin Rhythm Airplay is a chart that ranks the best-performing Spanish-language Latin rhythm singles in the United States. Published by Billboard magazine, the data is compiled by Nielsen SoundScan based collectively on each single's weekly airplay.

== Chart history ==
Key
†	Indicates number 1 on Billboard's year-end Latin rhythm chart

Issue date	Song	Artist	Ref
January 4	"Que Tire Pa Lante"	"Daddy Yankee	
January 11	"Que Tire Pa Lante"	"Daddy Yankee	
January 18	"Hasta Que Salga El Sol"	Ozuna	
January 25	"Que Tire Pa Lante"	Daddy Yankee	
February 1	"Que Tire Pa Lante"	Daddy Yankee	
February 8	"RITMO (Bad Boys For Life)"	The Black Eyed Peas and J Balvin	
February 15	"Tusa" †	Karol G & Nicki Minaj	
February 22	"Tusa" †	Karol G & Nicki Minaj	
February 29	"Qué Pena"	Maluma and J Balvin	
March 7	"Tusa" †	Karol G & Nicki Minaj	
March 14	"Vete"	Bad Bunny	
March 21	"Blanco"	J Balvin	
March 28	"Subelo (Further Up)"	Static & Ben El, Pitbull, and Chesca	
April 4	"Muévelo"	Nicky Jam and Daddy Yankee	
April 11	"Fantasía"	Ozuna	
April 18	"Me quedaré contigo"	Pitbull and Ne-Yo featuring Lenier and El Micha	
April 25	"Morado"	J Balvin	
May 2	"Keii"	Anuel AA	
May 9	"Tusa" †	Karol G & Nicki Minaj	
May 16	"Tusa" †	Karol G & Nicki Minaj	
May 23	"Sigues Con Él"	Arcángel, Sech and Romeo Santos	
May 30	"Definitivamente"	Daddy Yankee and Sech	
June 6	"Yo Perreo Sola"	Bad Bunny	
June 13	"Yo Perreo Sola"	Bad Bunny	
June 20	"Mamacita"	Black Eyed Peas, Ozuna and, J. Rey Soul	
June 27	"TBT"	Sebastián Yatra, Rauw Alejandro, Manuel Turizo	
July 4	"TBT"	Sebastián Yatra, Rauw Alejandro, Manuel Turizo	
July 11	"Mamacita"	Black Eyed Peas, Ozuna and, J. Rey Soul	
July 18	"Rojo"	J Balvin	
July 25	"Mamacita"	Black Eyed Peas, Ozuna, and J. Rey Soul	
August 1	"La Difícil"	Bad Bunny	
August 8	"Fútbol y Rumba"	Anuel AA featuring Enrique Iglesias	
August 15	"Caramelo"	Ozuna, Karol G, and Myke Towers	
August 22	"Caramelo"	Ozuna, Karol G, and Myke Towers	
August 29	Porfa	Feid, J Balvin, Maluma, Nicky Jam, Sech, Justin Quiles	
September 5	"Agua"	Tainy and J Balvin	
September 12	"Tattoo"	Rauw Alejandro and Camilo	
September 19	"Caramelo"	Ozuna, Karol G, and Myke Towers	
September 26	"Relación"	Sech, Daddy Yankee and J Balvin featuring Rosalía and Farruko	
October 3	"Hawái"	Maluma and the Weeknd	
October 10	"Ay, Dios Mio!"	Karol G	
October 17	"Un Día (One Day)"	J Balvin, Dua Lipa, Bad Bunny and Tainy	
October 24	"Hawái"	Maluma and the Weeknd	
October 31	"Hawái"	Maluma and the Weeknd	
November 7	"Hawái"	Maluma and the Weeknd	
November 14	"Hawái"	Maluma and the Weeknd	
November 21	"Gistro Amarillo"	Ozuna and Wisin	
November 28	"La Toxica"	Farruko	
December 5	"La Santa"	Bad Bunny and Daddy Yankee	
December 12	"Te Quiero Baby"	Chesca, Pitbull & Frankie Valli	
December 19	"Pa' Ti"	Jennifer Lopez and Maluma	
December 26	"Dakiti"	Bad Bunny and Jhay Cortez	
