= 2021 Billboard Latin Music Awards =

Annual American music awards ceremony

28th Billboard Latin Music Awards
- Date: September 23, 2021
- Site: Watsco Center, Coral Gables, Florida, United States
- Hosted by: Gaby Espino, Maite Perroni, William Levy & Pedro Fernandez

Highlights
- Most awards: Bad Bunny (10)
- Most nominations: Bad Bunny (22)

Television coverage
- Network: Universo and Telemundo Internacional
- Ratings: 3.6 million

The 28th Billboard Latin Music Awards ceremony, presented by Billboard to honor the most popular albums, songs and performers in Latin music, took place on September 23, 2021, at the Watsco Center in Coral Gables, Florida.

The red carpet for the event aired live on Telemundo while the ceremony was broadcast by Universo and Telemundo Internacional, the latter being for Latin America and the Caribbean.

== Performers ==
Artist(s)	Song(s)
Camila Cabello	"Don't Go Yet"
Christian Nodal & Banda MS de Sergio Lizarraga	"La Sinvergüenza"
Natti Natasha	"Noches en Miami (Dimitri Vegas & Like Mike vs. Bassjackers Remix)"
Juanes	"La Rebelión"
Carlos Rivera & Reik	"Cuántas Veces"
Myke Towers	"Experimento" "Pin Pin"
Ana Bárbara, Guadalupe Pineda & Yuri	Tribute to Juan Gabriel "Abrázame Muy Fuerte" "Se Me Olvidó Otra Vez" "Te Sigo Amando" "Me Nace del Corazón" "Amor Eterno"
Rauw Alejandro	"Todo de Ti"
Carlos Vives, Mau y Ricky & Lucy Vives	"Besos En Cualquier Horario"
Karol G	"El Makinon" "Bichota" "El Barco" "Ay, Dios Mío!" "Tusa"
Marc Anthony	"Pa'lla Voy"
Joss Favela	"Tu Adiós Como Tequila"
Reik & Rauw Alejandro	"Loquita"
Paquita la del Barrio & Ana Bárbara	"Rata de Dos Patas" "El Consejo"
Daddy Yankee	"Métele al Perreo"
Nicky Jam	"Miami"
Maná & Mabel	"El Reloj Cucú"
Tokischa & Rosalía	"Linda"
Prince Royce	"Lao A Lao"
Jhay Cortez & Skrillex	"En Mi Cuarto"

== Winners and nominees ==
The nominations were announced on August 12, 2021, with Puerto Rican singer Bad Bunny leading the nominations with 22, followed by Maluma with 11, J Balvin with 9 and Karol G, Anuel AA and Black Eyed Peas with 8 each. Due to the pause on touring for the last year, the category for Tour of the Year was not presented this year. In addition, the eligibility period was extended from its usual one-year period to 18 months (from February 1, 2020, to August 7, 2021), as the 2020 awards were delayed by the pandemic. Winners are listed first and highlighted in bold.

Artist of the Year	New Artist of the Year
**Bad Bunny**; Anuel AA; J Balvin; Maluma; Ozuna	**Myke Towers**; Camilo; Eslabon Armado; Kali Uchis; Rauw Alejandro
Crossover Artist of the Year	Duo/Group Hot Latin Songs Artist of the Year
**Black Eyed Peas**; Dua Lipa; Ne-Yo; Nicki Minaj; The Weeknd	**Banda MS de Sergio Lizárraga**; Calibre 50; Eslabon Armado; Grupo Firme; Los Dos Carnales
Vocal Event Hot Latin Song of the Year	Hot Latin Song of the Year
**Bad Bunny feat. Jhay Cortez – Dákiti**; Bad Bunny feat. Rosalía – La Noche de Anoche; Black Eyed Peas feat. J Balvin – Ritmo (Bad Boys For Life); Karol G feat. Nicki Minaj – Tusa; Maluma feat. The Weeknd – Hawái (Remix)	**Bad Bunny feat. Jhay Cortez – Dákiti**; Black Eyed Peas feat. J Balvin – Ritmo (Bad Boys For Life); Kali Uchis – telepatía; Karol G feat. Nicki Minaj – Tusa; Maluma feat. The Weeknd – Hawái (Remix)
Male Hot Latin Songs Artist of the Year	Female Hot Latin Songs Artist of the Year
**Bad Bunny**; Anuel AA; J Balvin; Jhay Cortez; Maluma	**Karol G**; Kali Uchis; Natti Natasha; Rosalía; Selena Gomez
Hot Latin Songs Label of the Year	Hot Latin Songs Imprint of the Year
**Rimas**; Epic; Interscope; Sony Music Latin; Universal Music Latin Entertainment	**Rimas**; Aura Music; Duars; Sony Music Latin; Universal Music Latino
Airplay Song of the Year	Airplay Label of the Year
**Maluma feat. The Weeknd – Hawái (Remix)**; Bad Bunny feat. Jhay Cortez – Dákiti; Karol G feat. Nicki Minaj – Tusa; Ozuna feat. Karol G & Myke Towers – Caramelo (Remix); Prince Royce – Carita de Inocente	**Sony Music Latin**; Remex; Rimas; Universal Music Latin Entertainment; Warner Latina
Airplay Imprint of the Year	Sales Song of the Year
**Sony Music Latin**; Aura; Fonovisa; Rimas; Universal Music Latino	**Black Eyed Peas feat. J Balvin – Ritmo (Bad Boys For Life)**; Bad Bunny feat. Jhay Cortez – Dákiti; Black Eyed Peas feat. Ozuna & J. Rey Soul – Mamacita; Karol G feat. Nicki Minaj – Tusa; Maluma feat. The Weeknd – Hawái (Remix)
Streaming Song of the Year	Top Latin Album of the Year
**Bad Bunny feat. Jhay Cortez – Dákiti**; Bad Bunny – Yo Perreo Sola; Bad Bunny – Vete; Bad Bunny feat. Jowell & Randy & Ñengo Flow – Safaera; Maluma feat. The Weeknd – Hawái	**Bad Bunny – YHLQMDLG**; Anuel AA – Emmanuel; Bad Bunny – El Último Tour del Mundo; Bad Bunny – Las que no iban a salir; Maluma – Papi Juancho
Male Top Latin Albums Artist of the Year	Female Top Latin Albums Artist of the Year
**Bad Bunny**; Anuel AA; J Balvin; Ozuna; Romeo Santos	**Karol G**; Becky G; Kali Uchis; Selena Gomez; Shakira
Duo/Group Top Latin Albums Artist of the Year	Top Latin Albums Label of the Year
**Eslabon Armado**; Aventura; Banda MS de Sergio Lizárraga; Black Eyed Peas; Los Legendarios	**Rimas**; Glad Empire; Rancho Humilde; Sony Music Latin; Universal Music Latin Entertainment
Top Latin Albums Imprint of the Year	Latin Pop Song of the Year
**Rimas**; DEL; Real Hasta La Muerte; Sony Music Latin; Universal Music Latin Entertainment	**Black Eyed Peas feat. Ozuna & J. Rey Soul – Mamacita**; Kali Uchis – telepatía; Reik feat. Farruko & Camilo – Si Me Dices Que Sí; Sebastián Yatra feat. Rauw Alejandro & Manuel Turizo – TBT; Shakira feat. Anuel AA – Me Gusta
Latin Pop Artist of the Year	Latin Pop Duo/Group of the Year
**Shakira**; Camilo; Enrique Iglesias; Kali Uchis; Luis Fonsi	**Maná**; CNCO; Mau y Ricky; Piso 21; Reik
Latin Pop Airplay Label of the Year	Latin Pop Airplay Imprint of the Year
**Sony Music Latin**; Epic; Rimas; Universal Music Latin Entertainment; Warner Latina	**Sony Music Latin**; Real Hasta La Muerte; Rimas; Universal Music Latino; WK
Latin Pop Album of the Year	Latin Pop Albums Label of the Year
**Kali Uchis – Sin Miedo (del Amor y Otros Demonios)**; Camilo – Mis Manos; Camilo – Por Primera Vez; Piso 21 – El Amor En Los Tiempos del Perreo; Selena Gomez – Revelación	**Universal Music Latin Entertainment**; Interscope Geffen A&M; Sony Music Latin; Thirty Tigers; Warner Latina
Latin Pop Albums Imprint of the Year	Tropical Song of the Year
**Universal Music Latino**; Capitol Latin; Hecho a Mano; Sony Music Latin; Warner Latina	**Prince Royce – Carita de Inocente**; Daddy Yankee feat. Marc Anthony – De Vuelta Pa' La Vuelta; Marc Anthony – Un Amor Eterno; Nio García feat. Casper Mágico, Ozuna, Wisin & Yandel, Myke Towers & Flow La Movie – Travesuras (Remix); Prince Royce – Lotería
Tropical Artist of the Year	Tropical Duo/Group of the Year
**Prince Royce**; Carlos Vives; Elvis Crespo; Marc Anthony; Romeo Santos	**Aventura**; Gente de Zona; La Sonora Dinamita; Monchy & Alexandra; N'Klabe
Tropical Songs Airplay Label of the Year	Tropical Songs Airplay Imprint of the Year
**Sony Music Latin**; El Cartel; LP; Pina; Universal Music Latin Entertainment	**Sony Music Latin**; El Cartel; Hecho a Mano; Pina; WK
Tropical Album of the Year	Tropical Albums Label of the Year
**Prince Royce – Alter Ego**; El Gran Combo de Puerto Rico – En Cuarentena; Frankie Ruiz – The Greatest Salsa Ever, Vol. 1; Gloria Estefan – Brazil305; Sonora Ponceña – Hegemonía Musical	**Sony Music Latin**; Discos Fuentes; The Orchard; Universal Music Latin Entertainment; Zacarías Ferreira
Tropical Albums Imprint of the Year	Regional Mexican Song of the Year
**Sony Music Latin**; Norte; Premium Latin; The Orchard; Top Stop	**Lenin Ramírez feat. Grupo Firme – Yo Ya No Vuelvo Contigo**; Banda MS de Sergio Lizárraga feat. Snoop Dogg – Que Maldición; El Fantasma feat. Los Dos Carnales – Cabrón y Vago; Los Dos Carnales – El Envidioso
Regional Mexican Artist of the Year	Regional Mexican Duo/Artist of the Year
**Christian Nodal**; El Fantasma; Junior H; Lenin Ramírez; Natanael Cano	**Banda MS de Sergio Lizárraga**; Calibre 50; Eslabon Armado; Los Ángeles Azules; Los Dos Carnales
Regional Mexican Airplay Label of the Year	Regional Mexican Airplay Imprint of the Year
**Universal Music Latin Entertainment**; Afinarte; Lizos; Remex; Sony Music Latin	**Fonovisa**; Afinarte; Disa; Lizos; Remex
Regional Mexican Album of the Year	Regional Mexican Albums Label of the Year
**Eslabon Armado – Tu Veneno Mortal**; Christian Nodal – AYAYAY!; Eslabon Armado – Corta Venas; Eslabon Armado – Vibras de Noche; Junior H – Atrapado En Un Sueño	**Universal Music Latin Entertainment**; Afinarte; DEL; Rancho Humilde; Sony Music Latin
Regional Mexican Albums Imprint of the Year	Latin Rhythm Song of the Year
**DEL**; Afinarte; Fonovisa; Lizos; Rancho Humilde	**Maluma feat. The Weeknd – Hawái (Remix)**; Bad Bunny feat. Jhay Cortez – Dákiti; Bad Bunny – Yo Perreo Sola; Black Eyed Peas feat. J Balvin – Ritmo (Bad Boys For Life); Karol G feat. Nicki Minaj – Tusa
Latin Rhythm Artist of the Year	Latin Rhythm Duo/Group of the Year
**Bad Bunny**; Anuel AA; J Balvin; Maluma; Ozuna	**Los Legendarios**; Jowell & Randy; Play-N-Skillz; Wisin & Yandel; Zion & Lennox
Latin Rhythm Airplay Label of the Year	Latin Rhythm Airplay Imprint of the Year
**Sony Music Latin**; Glad Empire; Rimas; Universal Music Latin Entertainment; Warner Latina	**Universal Music Latino**; Aura; La Industria; Rimas; Sony Music Latin
Latin Rhythm Album of the Year	Latin Rhythm Albums Label of the Year
**Bad Bunny – YHLQMDLG**; Anuel AA – Emmanuel; Bad Bunny – El Último Tour del Mundo; Bad Bunny – Las que no iban a salir; Maluma – Papi Juancho	**Rimas**; Glad Empire; Rich; Sony Music Latin; Universal Music Latin Entertainment
Latin Rhythm Albums Imprint of the Year	Producer of the Year
**Rimas**; Aura; Real Hasta La Muerte; Sony Music Latin; Universal Music Latino	**Tainy**; Mora; Ovy On The Drums; Sky Rompiendo; Súbelo Neo
Publisher of the Year	Publishing Corporation of the Year
**RSM Publishing, ASCAP**; Sony Discos Music Publishing LLC, ASCAP; Universal Music Corp, ASCAP; WC Music Corp, ASCAP	**Sony Music Publishing**; Kobalt Music; RSM Publishing; Universal Music; Warner Chappell Music
Songwriter of the Year
**Bad Bunny**; Anuel AA; Edgar 'Edge' Barrera; J Balvin; Tainy

=== Special Merit Awards ===
- Lifetime Achievement Award: Paquita la del Barrio
- Hall of Fame: Daddy Yankee
- Icon Award: Maná
