= Dakiti =

2020 single by Bad Bunny and Jhayco

Single by Bad Bunny and Jhay Cortez

from the album El Último Tour Del Mundo
- Language: Spanish
- Released: October 30, 2020
- Recorded: 2020
- Genre: Reggaeton; Latin pop
- Length: 3:25
- Label: Rimas
- Songwriters: Benito Martínez; Jesús Nieves; Marco Masís; Egbert Rosa; Gabriel Mora; Nydia Laner
- Producers: Bad Bunny; Jhayco; Tainy; La Paciencia

Bad Bunny singles chronology
"Una Vez" (2020)	"Dakiti" (2020)	"Yo Visto Así" (2020)

Jhayco singles chronology
"Only Fans (remix)" (2020)	"Dakiti" (2020)	"Pecar" (2020)

Music video
- "Dakiti" on YouTube

"Dakiti" (also titled "Dákiti") is a song by Puerto Rican rappers Bad Bunny and Jhayco (credited as Jhay Cortez). It was released on October 30, 2020 through Rimas Entertainment as the lead single from Bad Bunny's third studio album, El Último Tour Del Mundo. The island-tinged song simultaneously debuted in the top ten on the Billboard Hot 100, and number one on the Hot Latin Songs chart, becoming the first song in history to do so. It peaked at number five on the Hot 100, and simultaneously topped both the Billboard Global 200 and Global Excl. U.S., the first Spanish-language song to do so. On Spotify, it has over 2.5 billion streams, as of October 2025, making it one of the most-streamed Latin songs on the platform, as well as one of the most-streamed non-English language songs. The third collaboration between the artists, it reached number one in Argentina, Dominican Republic, Mexico, Spain, Sweden and the top 10 in France, Italy, Netherlands, Portugal and almost all of Latin America. The song also spent a total of 27 weeks at the top of the Hot Latin Songs chart.

== Background ==
The song was first teased by Bad Bunny on October 26, 2020, via his Instagram account; he previewed the song's instrumental and stated that it was coming "soon". Bad Bunny and Cortez previously collaborated on remixes for "No Me Conoce" and "Cómo Se Siente". Bad Bunny stated: "In this case, it's the first time we were able to work together in the studio, unlike the other two songs that were done via phone. Sharing ideas in person is the key of the success of the song". Following the song's release, Bunny tweeted a video of him doing a dance to the song, challenging his followers to post their own videos of the dance. "Dakiti" marks the first solo material from Bad Bunny since the release of his May 2020 album Las que no iban a salir.

== Recording and composition ==
Bad Bunny explained how the creative process of the song was different than his previous works: "I usually have a main idea for a song. For this one, though, Jhay composed the base, the initial rhythm and the main idea together with Mora. I then added to the evolution of the production, rhythm and lyrics with Tainy. It was a combined effort, which is unusual for me, but when one works as a team, great things come out".

"Dakiti" is a "slow-burning", "futuristic" reggaeton song with "wavy" electronic sounds backing the production. It contains an edgy synth riff, "lush" ambience, as well as heavier, thumping beats, and, as noted by ¡Hola!'s Rebecah Jacobs, is "a departure from the more aggressive reggaetón celebrations we're used to hearing from Bad Bunny on his 2020 releases, YHLQMDLG and Las que no iban a salir. Lyrically, the song sees the artists aiming to win over their love interests by flaunting their luxurious lifestyles. The title of the song has been speculated to refer to either the name of a beach or possibly an old bar in Puerto Rico.

== Music video ==
The song's release was accompanied by an "aquatic" music video directed by Stillz, who worked on some of Bad Bunny's previous visuals, including "Yo Perreo Sola". The video sees Bad Bunny and Cortez performing the song in an isolated floating box in the middle of the ocean. They also party underwater, on a boat and pilot their own submarines. Bad Bunny sports braided curls and a skirt, with Cortez wearing jewelry by Ian Delucca. The video concludes with a big truck driving by with a message that reads: :El Último Tour Del Mundo" ("The Last Tour of the World"). As of May 2026, it remains Bad Bunny's most watched music video on YouTube, with a total of 1.7 billion views.

== Chart performance ==
The song debuted at number nine on the US Billboard Hot 100. It became Bad Bunny's third Hot 100 top 10, following "I Like It", his collaboration with Cardi B and J Balvin, and "Mia", featuring Drake, both in 2018. "Dakiti" also joined "Mia" as the only all-Spanish-language songs to have ever debuted in the Hot 100's top 10. The song marked Cortez's first top 10 on the chart. It reached number five in its fifth charting week.

It also debuted at number one on the Hot Latin Songs chart, marking the first time a song debuted in the Hot 100 top 10 and atop Hot Latin Songs simultaneously. It became the third song in 2020 to debut at number one on the latter chart; the previous two debuts also belong to Bad Bunny ("Si Veo a Tu Mamá" and "Un Día (One Day)"). The song earned the biggest streaming week for a Latin song, garnering 22.2 million streams, besting Bad Bunny's own "Si Veo a Tu Mamá", which accumulated 19 million streams in March 2020.

"Dakiti" topped the Billboard Global 200 chart for two weeks. It became the first song to earn 100 million streams two weeks in a row on the chart. It also became the first Spanish-language song to top both the Global 200 and the Global Excl. U.S. 200, doing so simultaneously.

Bad Bunny said of the song's success, "This one is very special because it's a song that came out of nothing. We didn't expect to have success of this magnitude. Working with Jhay, both Latinos from Puerto Rico representing at a global level, fills me with pride as we are competing amongst great songs and artists".

== Charts ==
=== Weekly charts ===
Chart performance for "Dakiti"
Chart (2020–2026)	Peak position
Argentina Hot 100 (Billboard)	1
Belgium (Ultratip Bubbling Under Flanders)	26
Belgium (Ultratop 50 Wallonia)	22
Bolivia (Billboard)	14
Canada Hot 100 (Billboard)	73
Chile (Billboard)	22
Colombia (Billboard)	19
Costa Rica (Monitor Latino)	19
Dominican Republic (Monitor Latino)	13
Dominican Republic (SODINPRO)	1
Ecuador (Billboard)	12
El Salvador (Monitor Latino)	15
France (SNEP)	5
Germany (GfK)	88
Global 200 (Billboard)	1
Greece International (IFPI)	22
Guatemala (Monitor Latino)	20
Honduras (Monitor Latino)	4
Italy (FIMI)	11
Lithuania (AGATA)	52
Mexico (Billboard)	9
Mexico (Billboard Mexican Airplay)	32
Mexico (Billboard Espanol Airplay)	9
Mexico Streaming (AMPROFON)	1
Netherlands (Dutch Tipparade 40)	2
Netherlands (Single Tip)	2
New Zealand Hot Singles (RMNZ)	30
Nicaragua (Monitor Latino)	4
Panama (Monitor Latino)	10
Paraguay (SGP)	7
Peru (Billboard)	16
Portugal (AFP)	5
Puerto Rico (Monitor Latino)	10
Spain (Promusicae)	1
Sweden Heatseeker (Sverigetopplistan)	1
Switzerland (Schweizer Hitparade)	12
Uruguay (Monitor Latino)	7
US Billboard Hot 100	5
US Hot Latin Songs (Billboard)	1
US Latin Airplay (Billboard)	1
US Pop Airplay (Billboard)	19
US Rhythmic Airplay (Billboard)	3
Venezuela (Monitor Latino)	6

2026 chart performance for "Dakiti"
Chart (2026)	Peak position
Canada Hot 100 (Billboard)	48
Greece International (IFPI)	22
US Hot Latin Rhythm Songs (Billboard)	10

=== Year-end charts ===
2020 year-end chart performance for "Dakiti"
Chart (2020)	Position
Spain (PROMUSICAE)	11

2021 year-end chart performance for "Dakiti"
Chart (2021)	Position
Belgium (Ultratop Wallonia)	34
France (SNEP)	30
Global 200 (Billboard)	6
Italy (FIMI)	77
Portugal (AFP)	26
Spain (PROMUSICAE)	13
Switzerland (Schweizer Hitparade)	51
US Billboard Hot 100	28
US Hot Latin Songs (Billboard)	1
US Rhythmic (Billboard)	27

2022 year-end chart performance for "Dakiti"
Chart (2022)	Position
Global 200 (Billboard)	61
US Hot Latin Songs (Billboard)	13

=== All-time charts ===
All-time chart performance for "Dakiti"
Chart (2021)	Position
US Hot Latin Songs (Billboard)	16

== Certifications ==
Certifications and sales for "Dakiti"
Region	Certification	Certified units/sales
Denmark (IFPI Danmark)	Gold	45,000^{‡}
Germany (BVMI)	Gold	300,000^{‡}
France (SNEP)	Diamond	333,333^{‡}
Italy (FIMI)	3× Platinum	300,000^{‡}
New Zealand (RMNZ)	Gold	15,000^{‡}
Norway (IFPI Norway)	Gold	30,000^{‡}
Portugal (AFP)	4× Platinum	40,000^{‡}
Spain (Promusicae)	9× Platinum	540,000^{‡}
United Kingdom (BPI)	Silver	200,000^{‡}
United States (RIAA)	24× Platinum (Latin)	1,440,000^{‡}
Streaming
Greece (IFPI Greece)	Platinum	2,000,000^{†}
Sweden (GLF)	Gold	6,000,000^{†}
^{‡} Sales+streaming figures based on certification alone.^{†} Streaming-only figures based on certification alone.

== Release history ==
Release dates for "Dakiti"
Country	Date	Format	Label	Ref.
Various	October 30, 2020	Digital download; streaming	Rimas	
United States	November 24, 2020	Rhythmic contemporary radio	Rimas; The Orchard	
United States	November 24, 2020	Contemporary hit radio	Rimas; The Orchard	

== See also ==
- List of Billboard Global 200 number ones of 2020
- List of Billboard Hot Latin Songs and Latin Airplay number ones of 2020
