= Si Veo a Tu Mamá =

Single by Bad Bunny

from the album YHLQMDLG
- Language: Spanish
- Released: March 2, 2020
- Genre: Latin trap; hip hop
- Length: 2:50
- Label: Rimas
- Songwriter: Benito Martínez
- Producers: Subelo NEO; Elikai

Bad Bunny singles chronology
"La Difícil" (2020)	"Si Veo a Tu Mamá" (2020)	"Pero Ya No" (2020)

Music video
- "Si Veo a Tu Mamá" on YouTube

"Si Veo a Tu Mamá" (English: "If I See Your Mother") is a song by Puerto Rican rapper Bad Bunny from his third studio album YHLQMDLG (2020). It was released on March 2, 2020, as the fourth single from the album. The song was solely written by Bunny with Subelo NEO and Elikai handling the production and it interpolates "The Girl from Ipanema", written by Antônio Carlos Jobim, Vinícius de Moraes and Norman Gimbel, performed by Stan Getz and João Gilberto.

== Lyrics ==
"Si Veo a Tu Mamá" talks about a person who has not moved on yet from his former partner, no matter how much he pretends he is over her. The person is curious about his ex and is willing to ask their mother about them.

== Promotion and release ==
On February 28, 2020, Bad Bunny announced his third studio album that was revealed to be YHLQMDLG during his performance and guest appearance on The Tonight Show Starring Jimmy Fallon, which was released the following day.

== Commercial performance ==
Following the releasing of its parent album, "Si Veo a Tu Mamá" charted at number 32 on the US Billboard Hot 100 dated March 14, 2020, becoming the highest charting track from YHLQMDLG as well as peaking at number 1 on the US Hot Latin Songs chart upon the issue date of March 14, 2020, becoming the highest charting track. In Spain, "Si Veo a Tu Mamá" reached at number 10.

== Audio visualizer ==
A visualizer video for the song was uploaded to YouTube on February 29, 2020, along with the other visualizer videos of the songs that appeared on YHLQMDLG.

== Music video ==
A music video for "Si Veo a Tu Mamá" was released on March 2, 2020 on YouTube.

== Charts ==
=== Weekly charts ===
Chart performance for "Si Veo a Tu Mamá"
Chart (2020–2022)	Peak position
Argentina Hot 100 (Billboard)	72
Ecuador (Billboard)	25
Spain (Promusicae)	10
US Billboard Hot 100	32
US Hot Latin Songs (Billboard)	1

Chart (2026)	Peak position
Portugal (AFP)	115

=== Year-end charts ===
Chart (2020)	Position
US Hot Latin Songs (Billboard)	9

== Certifications ==
Certifications and sales for "Si Veo a Tu Mamá"
Region	Certification	Certified units/sales
Spain (Promusicae)	2× Platinum	120,000^{‡}
United States (RIAA)	17× Platinum (Latin)	1,020,000^{‡}
^{‡} Sales+streaming figures based on certification alone.

== See also ==
- List of Billboard Hot Latin Songs and Latin Airplay number ones of 2020
