= Jose (album) =

2021 studio album by J Balvin

- Cover for deluxe version of the album uses the same photograph but against a red background.

Studio album by J Balvin
- Released: September 10, 2021
- Genre: Reggaeton
- Length: 79:20
- Language: Spanish; English
- Label: Universal Latin
- Producer: Tainy; Sky Rompiendo; Skrillex; Taiko; De La Cruz; MVSIS; Mosty; Diplo; Rampa; Maximilian Jaeger; Wondra030; Jasper Helderman; Bas van Daalen; Jota Rosa; Leo RD; Richi López; ErickAnt; Jeff Kleinman; Lelo; Jazz; Lexuz; Keityn; Alex The Big Pieces; Fenix The Producer

J Balvin chronology
Colores (2020)	Jose (2021)	Rayo (2024)

Singles from Jose
- 1. "Un Día (One Day)" Released: 23 July 2020; 2. "Otra Noche sin Ti" Released: 8 April 2021; 3. "7 de Mayo" Released: 7 May 2021; 4. "Qué Más Pues?" Released: 27 May 2021; 5. "Otro Fili" Released: 11 June 2021; 6. "Poblado (Remix)" Released: 18 June 2021; 7. "In da Getto" Released: 2 July 2021; 8. "Que Locura" Released: 13 August 2021; 9. "Perra" Released: 27 August 2021; 10. "Si Te Atreves" Released: 10 September 2021; 11. "Vestido" Released: 1 October 2021; 12. "Una Nota" Released: 12 November 2021; 13. "F40" Released: 10 December 2021; 14. "Lo Que Dios Quiera" Released: 6 January 2022

Jose (stylised in all caps) is the fifth solo studio album (sixth overall) by Colombian reggaeton singer J Balvin, released on September 10, 2021, through Universal Latin. The album was preceded by six singles: "Otra Noche sin Ti", "7 de Mayo", "Qué Más Pues?", "Otro Fili", "In da Getto", and "Que Locura". The album also includes the standalone single "Un Día (One Day)" with Dua Lipa, Bad Bunny and Tainy. It is the longest studio album Balvin ever released, clocking at 79 minutes.

The album featured production from Tainy, Sky Rompiendo, Skrillex, Taiko, De La Cruz, MVSIS, Mosty, Diplo, Rampa, Maximilian Jaeger, Wondra030, Jasper Helderman, Bas van Daalen, Jota Rosa, Leo RD, Richi López, ErickAnt, Jeff Kleinman, Lelo, Jazz, Lexuz, Keityn, Alex The Big Pieces and Fenix The Producer, alongside collaborations with Sech, Yandel, Skrillex, Myke Towers, Jhay Cortez, Feid, Zion & Lennox, Ozuna, Tokischa, María Becerra, Khalid, Karol G, Nicky Jam, among others.

Commercially, the album reached number 12 on the US Billboard 200 chart, as well as, reaching number one on both the Top Latin Albums and Latin Rhythm Albums chart, with 27,000 album equivalent units being Balvin's fourth album top the chart.

The album was nominated for Best Música Urbana Album at the 64th Annual Grammy Awards.

The Deluxe edition of the album was released on December 17, 2021, featuring 8 more tracks. including a new guest appearance by Arcángel on "F40 (Remix)".

== Critical reception ==
Jose ratings
Aggregate scores
Source	Rating
Metacritic	72/100
Review scores
Source	Rating
AllMusic	4/5 stars
Clash	8/10
Exclaim!	9/10
Rolling Stone	3.5/5 stars

Jose received generally positive reviews. At Metacritic, which assigns a normalized rating out of 100 to reviews from mainstream publications, the album received an average score of 72, based on five reviews, indicating "generally favorable reviews". Antoine-Samuel Mauffette Alavo from Exclaim! gave the album a 9 out of 10, writing that "with the release of Balvin's fifth solo album, JOSE, he is on a mission to humbly recapture his seat on the throne — and undeniably succeeds". Ecleen Luzmila Caraballo from Rolling Stone gave the album three and a half stars out of five, writing that Balvin "promises introspection but instead gives us more of what we’ve come to expect", and that "this isn't a new J Balvin, just the one we've known all along".

In a more mixed review, Robin Murray from Clash rated the album a 6 out of 10, commenting on the length of the album writing that "it struggles under the weight of its 24 track span – clocking in at more than hour, the record at times tries the patience", though he highlighted the tracks "Que Locura", "Una Nota", "Que Mas Pues?" and "Suerte" as high points of the album.

== Track listing ==
Jose track listing
No.	Title	Writer(s)	Producer(s)	Length
1.	"F40"	Tainy; José Osorio; Jota Rosa; Kris Floyd	Tainy	2:41
2.	"Una Nota" (with Sech)	J. Osorio; Sech; Tainy; Sky Rompiendo	Tainy; Sky Rompiendo	2:50
3.	"Te Acuerdas de Mí" (with Yandel)	J. Osorio; Sech; Tainy; Sky Rompiendo; Yandel	Tainy; Sky Rompiendo	1:44
4.	"In da Getto" (with Skrillex)	J. Osorio; Delta Bennett; Handel Tucker; Sonny John Moore; Kevyn Mauricio Cruz Moreno; Sly Dunbar; Omniverse; Tainy	Skrillex; Tainy	2:10
5.	"Billetes de 100" (with Myke Towers)	Keityn; Alberto Carlos Melendez; J. Osorio; Jota Rosa; Michael A. Torres Monge; Misael De La Cruz; MVSIS; Sky Rompiendo; Taiko	Sky Rompiendo; Taiko; De La Cruz; MVSIS; Tainy	2:44
6.	"La Venganza" (with Jhay Cortez)	J. Osorio; Jhay Cortez; Keityn; Nydia Laner; Sky Rompiendo; Taiko	Sky Rompiendo; Taiko	4:07
7.	"Vestido"	J. Osorio; Keityn; Mosty; Taiko	Taiko; Mosty	3:06
8.	"Qué Locura"	David Vogt; Hannes Büscher; Phillip Böllhoff; Sipho Sililo; Gregor Sütterlin; J. Osorio; Richard Cook Mears IV; Thomas Wesley Pentz	Diplo; Rampa; Maximilian Jaeger; Wondra030	3:18
9.	"Bebé Qué Bien Te Ves" (with Feid)	J. Osorio; Feid; Lenny Tavárez; Sky Rompiendo	Sky Rompiendo	3:46
10.	"Lo Que Dios Quiera"	Keityn; Tainy; Bull Nene; J. Osorio; Sech; Sky Rompiendo	Sky Rompiendo; Tainy	3:14
11.	"Si Te Atreves" (with Zion & Lennox)	Jasper Helderman; Alejandro Ramirez; Bas van Daalen; D. Vogt; Gregor Sütterlin; H. Büscher; J. Osorio; Keityn; Lennox; P. Böllhoff; René Cano; Ronald Eduardo Hernandez Toro; S. Sililo; T. Wesley Pentz; Zion	Diplo; Jasper Helderman; Bas van Daalen	2:49
12.	"Fantasías"	J. Osorio; Keityn; MVSIS; Tainy	MVSIS; Tainy	3:15
13.	"Pa' Guayarte" (with Ozuna)	J. Osorio; Jan Carlos Ozuna Rosado; Luis Angel O'Neill Laureano; Rio; Sky Rompiendo	Sky Rompiendo	3:17
14.	"Ganas de Verte"	Bull Nene; J. Osorio; Jota Rosa; Keityn; K. Floyd; Tainy	Tainy; Jota Rosa	2:57
15.	"Perra" (with Tokischa)	K. Cruz; Cromo X; J. Osorio; Juan Vargas; Leonardo Felipe Yasmil; Raymi Miguel Paulus Torres; Tokischa	Leo RD	2:37
16.	"7 de Mayo"	J. Osorio; Keityn; Tainy	Tainy	3:29
17.	"Suerte"	Tainy; J. Osorio; Jota Rosa; Mosty; Sky Rompiendo	Tainy; Jota Rosa; Sky Rompiendo	3:23
18.	"Querido Río"	Keityn; J. Osorio; Tainy; Jota Rosa; Richi López	Tainy; Jota Rosa; Richi López	2:31
19.	"La Familia"	Erick A. Celis Marin; J. Osorio; Keityn	ErickAnt	4:11
20.	"Qué Más Pues?" (with María Becerra)	Keityn; A. Ramirez; J. Osorio; Jeff Kleinma; María Becerra	Jeff Kleinman; Sky Rompiendo	3:37
21.	"Otro Fili" (with Jay Wheeler)	K. Cruz Moreno; Emanuel Infante; J. Osorio; Jose Angel Lopez Martinez; Kristian Dariel Ginorio; Luis Suarez Silva; Nelson Diaz	Lelo; Jazz	3:22
22.	"Otra Noche sin Ti" (with Khalid)	K. Cruz Moreno; J. Osorio; Khalid Donnel Robinson; Lenin Yorney Palacios Machado	Lexuz; Keityn	3:48
23.	"Poblado (remix)" (with Karol G and Nicky Jam featuring Crissin, Totoy El Frio and Natan & Shander)	K. Cruz Moreno; Alexander Baena Vergara; Alexander Rojas Pineda; Andres Jael Correa Rios; Carolina Giraldo Navarro; Christian Tascon Velasco; Fabrizzio Hernández Dovalle; Gerald Oscar Jimenez; Jhon Marín Bastidas; J. Osorio; J. Vargas; Juan Lujan Torres; Juan Medina; Justin Quiles; Natanael Baena Vergara; Nick Rivera Caminero	Alex The Big Pieces; Fenix The Producer	6:32
24.	"Un Día (One Day)" (with Dua Lipa, Bad Bunny and Tainy)	Marco Masis; Alejandro Borrero; Benito Martinez Ocasio; Clarence Coffee Jr.; Daystar Peterson; Dua Lipa; Ivanni Rodríguez; J. Osorio; Maximiliano Rivera Cordoba	Tainy; J Balvin	3:51

== Charts ==
=== Weekly charts ===
Weekly chart performance for Jose
Chart (2021)	Peak position
Belgian Albums (Ultratop Flanders)	127
Belgian Albums (Ultratop Wallonia)	112
Canadian Albums (Billboard)	26
Dutch Albums (Album Top 100)	30
French Albums (SNEP)	40
Italian Albums (FIMI)	10
Spanish Albums (PROMUSICAE)	1
Swiss Albums (Schweizer Hitparade)	14
US Billboard 200	12
US Top Latin Albums (Billboard)	1
US Latin Rhythm Albums (Billboard)	1

=== Year-end charts ===
Year-end chart performance for Jose
Chart (2021)	Position
Spanish Albums (PROMUSICAE)	32
US Top Latin Albums (Billboard)	36
Chart (2022)	Position
Spanish Albums (PROMUSICAE)	30

== Certifications ==
Certifications for Jose
Region	Certification	Certified units/sales
Italy (FIMI)	Gold	25,000^{‡}
Mexico (AMPROFON)	2× Platinum+Gold	350,000^{‡}
Poland (ZPAV)	Gold	10,000^{‡}
Spain (PROMUSICAE)	Gold	20,000^{‡}
United States (RIAA)	14× Platinum (Latin)	840,000^{‡}
Streaming
Central America (CFC)	Platinum	7,000,000^{†}
^{‡} Sales+streaming figures based on certification alone.^{†} Streaming-only figures based on certification alone.

== See also ==
- 2021 in Latin music
- List of number-one Billboard Latin Albums from the 2020s
- List of number-one Billboard Latin Rhythm Albums of 2021
