= Bichiyal =

Single by Bad Bunny featuring Yaviah

from the album YHLQMDLG
- Language: Spanish
- Released: March 13, 2020
- Genre: Reggaeton
- Length: 3:16
- Label: Rimas
- Songwriters: Benito Martínez; Javier Marcano; Ernesto Padilla; Jose Cruz; Freddy Montalvo
- Producers: Nesty; Subelo NEO

Bad Bunny singles chronology
"Hablamos Mañana" (2020)	"Bichiyal" (2020)	"Yo Perreo Sola" (2020)

Music video
- "Bichiyal" on YouTube

"Bichiyal" is a song by Puerto Rican rapper Bad Bunny featuring fellow Puerto Rican singer Yaviah from his third studio album YHLQMDLG (2020). It was released on March 13, 2020, as the seventh single from the album. The song was written by Benito Martínez, Ernesto Padilla, Jose Cruz, Freddy Montalvo and Javier Marcano and it was produced by Nesty and Subelo NEO.

== Context ==
"Bichiyal" is a portmanteau of two popular slang words in Puerto Rico, "bicha" and "yal". The song is about a woman and the gap between Puerto Rico's upper-middle class and the poor.

== Promotion and release ==
On February 28, 2020, Bad Bunny announced his third studio album that was revealed to be YHLQMDLG during his performance and guest appearance on The Tonight Show Starring Jimmy Fallon, which was released the following day.

== Commercial performance ==
Following the releasing of its parent album, "Pero Ya No" charted at number 89 on the US Billboard Hot 100 dated March 14, 2020, becoming the lowest charting track from YHLQMDLG as well as peaking at number 11 on the US Hot Latin Songs chart upon the issue date of March 14, 2020. In Spain, "Pero Ya No" reached at number 22.

== Audio visualizer ==
A visualizer video for the song was uploaded to YouTube on February 29, 2020, along with the other visualizer videos of the songs that appeared on YHLQMDLG.

== Music video ==
A music video for "Bichiyal" was released on March 13, 2020, on YouTube.

== Charts ==
=== Weekly charts ===
Chart performance for "Pero Ya No"
Chart (2020)	Peak position
Spain (PROMUSICAE)	22
US Billboard Hot 100	89
US Hot Latin Songs (Billboard)	11

=== Year-end charts ===
Chart (2020)	Position
US Hot Latin Songs (Billboard)	46

== Certifications ==
Certifications and sales for "Bichiyal"
Region	Certification	Certified units/sales
Spain (PROMUSICAE)	Platinum	60,000^{‡}
^{‡} Sales+streaming figures based on certification alone.
