= List of Billboard Latin Rhythm Albums number ones of 2022 =

The Latin Rhythm Albums chart is a music chart published in Billboard magazine. The data is compiled by Nielsen SoundScan from a sample that includes music stores, music departments at electronics and department stores, internet sales (both physical and digital) and verifiable sales from concert venues in the United States. The chart is composed of studio, live, and compilation releases by Latin artists performing in the Latin hip hop, urban, dance and reggaeton, the most popular Latin Rhythm music genres.

== Albums ==
Chart date	Album	Artist(s)	Reference
January 1	YHLQMDLG	Bad Bunny	
January 8	YHLQMDLG	Bad Bunny	
January 15	Anniversary Trilogy	Bad Bunny	
January 22	YHLQMDLG	Bad Bunny	
January 29	YHLQMDLG	Bad Bunny	
February 5	YHLQMDLG	Bad Bunny	
February 12	YHLQMDLG	Bad Bunny	
February 19	YHLQMDLG	Bad Bunny	
February 26	YHLQMDLG	Bad Bunny	
March 5	YHLQMDLG	Bad Bunny	
March 12	YHLQMDLG	Bad Bunny	
March 19	YHLQMDLG	Bad Bunny	
March 26	YHLQMDLG	Bad Bunny	
April 2	YHLQMDLG	Bad Bunny	
April 9	Legendaddy	Daddy Yankee	
April 16	YHLQMDLG	Bad Bunny	
April 23	YHLQMDLG	Bad Bunny	
April 30	YHLQMDLG	Bad Bunny	
May 7	YHLQMDLG	Bad Bunny	
May 14	YHLQMDLG	Bad Bunny	
May 21	Un Verano Sin Ti	Bad Bunny	
May 28	Un Verano Sin Ti	Bad Bunny	
June 4	Un Verano Sin Ti	Bad Bunny	
June 11	Un Verano Sin Ti	Bad Bunny	
June 18	Un Verano Sin Ti	Bad Bunny	
June 25	Un Verano Sin Ti	Bad Bunny	
July 2	Un Verano Sin Ti	Bad Bunny	
July 9	Un Verano Sin Ti	Bad Bunny	
July 16	Un Verano Sin Ti	Bad Bunny	
July 23	Un Verano Sin Ti	Bad Bunny	
July 30	Un Verano Sin Ti	Bad Bunny	
August 6	Un Verano Sin Ti	Bad Bunny	
August 13	Un Verano Sin Ti	Bad Bunny	
August 20	Un Verano Sin Ti	Bad Bunny	
August 27	Un Verano Sin Ti	Bad Bunny	
September 3	Un Verano Sin Ti	Bad Bunny	
September 10	Un Verano Sin Ti	Bad Bunny	
September 17	Un Verano Sin Ti	Bad Bunny	
September 24	Un Verano Sin Ti	Bad Bunny	
October 1	Un Verano Sin Ti	Bad Bunny	
October 8	Un Verano Sin Ti	Bad Bunny	
October 15	Un Verano Sin Ti	Bad Bunny	
October 22	Un Verano Sin Ti	Bad Bunny	
October 29	Un Verano Sin Ti	Bad Bunny	
November 5	Un Verano Sin Ti	Bad Bunny	
November 12	Un Verano Sin Ti	Bad Bunny	
November 19	Un Verano Sin Ti	Bad Bunny	
November 26	Un Verano Sin Ti	Bad Bunny	
December 3	Un Verano Sin Ti	Bad Bunny	
December 10	Un Verano Sin Ti	Bad Bunny	
December 17	Un Verano Sin Ti	Bad Bunny	
December 24	Un Verano Sin Ti	Bad Bunny	
December 31	Un Verano Sin Ti	Bad Bunny	
