= List of Billboard Latin Rhythm Albums number ones of 2021 =

The Latin Rhythm Albums chart is a music chart published in Billboard magazine. The data is compiled by Nielsen SoundScan from a sample that includes music stores, music departments at electronics and department stores, internet sales (both physical and digital) and verifiable sales from concert venues in the United States. The chart is composed of studio, live, and compilation releases by Latin artists performing in the Latin hip hop, urban, dance and reggaeton, the most popular Latin Rhythm music genres.

== Albums ==
Chart date	Album	Artist(s)	Reference
January 2	El Último Tour Del Mundo	Bad Bunny	
January 9	El Último Tour Del Mundo	Bad Bunny	
January 16	El Último Tour Del Mundo	Bad Bunny	
January 23	El Último Tour Del Mundo	Bad Bunny	
January 30	El Último Tour Del Mundo	Bad Bunny	
February 6	Los Dioses	Anuel AA & Ozuna	
February 13	El Último Tour Del Mundo	Bad Bunny	
February 20	El Último Tour Del Mundo	Bad Bunny	
February 27	El Último Tour Del Mundo	Bad Bunny	
March 6	El Último Tour Del Mundo	Bad Bunny	
March 13	El Último Tour Del Mundo	Bad Bunny	
March 20	El Último Tour Del Mundo	Bad Bunny	
March 27	El Último Tour Del Mundo	Bad Bunny	
April 3	El Último Tour Del Mundo	Bad Bunny	
April 10	KG0516	Karol G	
April 17	El Último Tour Del Mundo	Bad Bunny	
April 24	El Último Tour Del Mundo	Bad Bunny	
May 1	El Último Tour Del Mundo	Bad Bunny	
May 8	El Último Tour Del Mundo	Bad Bunny	
May 15	El Último Tour Del Mundo	Bad Bunny	
May 22	El Último Tour Del Mundo	Bad Bunny	
May 29	El Último Tour Del Mundo	Bad Bunny	
June 5	El Último Tour Del Mundo	Bad Bunny	
June 12	El Último Tour Del Mundo	Bad Bunny	
June 19	El Último Tour Del Mundo	Bad Bunny	
June 26	El Último Tour Del Mundo	Bad Bunny	
July 3	El Último Tour Del Mundo	Bad Bunny	
July 10	Vice Versa	Rauw Alejandro	
July 17	Vice Versa	Rauw Alejandro	
July 24	YHLQMDLG	Bad Bunny	
July 31	YHLQMDLG	Bad Bunny	
August 7	YHLQMDLG	Bad Bunny	
August 14	YHLQMDLG	Bad Bunny	
August 21	YHLQMDLG	Bad Bunny	
August 28	YHLQMDLG	Bad Bunny	
September 4	YHLQMDLG	Bad Bunny	
September 11	YHLQMDLG	Bad Bunny	
September 18	YHLQMDLG	Bad Bunny	
September 25	Jose	J Balvin	
October 2	Jose	J Balvin	
October 9	Jose	J Balvin	
October 16	La 167	Farruko	
October 23	YHLQMDLG	Bad Bunny	
October 30	YHLQMDLG	Bad Bunny	
November 6	YHLQMDLG	Bad Bunny	
November 13	YHLQMDLG	Bad Bunny	
November 20	YHLQMDLG	Bad Bunny	
November 27	YHLQMDLG	Bad Bunny	
December 4	YHLQMDLG	Bad Bunny	
December 11	Las Leyendas Nunca Mueren	Anuel AA	
December 18	Las Leyendas Nunca Mueren	Anuel AA	
December 25	YHLQMDLG	Bad Bunny	
