= Pero Ya No =

Single by Bad Bunny

from the album YHLQMDLG
- Language: Spanish
- Released: March 3, 2020
- Genre: Latin trap; hip hop
- Length: 2:40
- Label: Rimas
- Songwriters: Benito Martínez; Gabriel Mora; Jose Cruz; Freddy Montalvo; Jesus Prato
- Producers: Subelo NEO; EMG; Dex Wright

Bad Bunny singles chronology
| "Si Veo a Tu Mamá" (2020) | "Pero Ya No" (2020) | "Hablamos Mañana" (2020) |

Music video
- "Pero Ya No" on YouTube

"Pero Ya No" (English: "But Not Anymore") is a song by Puerto Rican rapper Bad Bunny from his third studio album YHLQMDLG (2020). It was released on March 3, 2020, as the fifth single from the album. The song was solely written by Benito Martínez, Gabriel Mora, Jose Cruz, Freddy Montalvo and Jesus Prato and it was produced by Subelo NEO, EMG and Dex Wright.

== Promotion and release ==
On February 28, 2020, Bad Bunny announced his third studio album that was revealed to be YHLQMDLG during his performance and guest appearance on The Tonight Show Starring Jimmy Fallon, which was released the following day.

== Commercial performance ==
Following the releasing of its parent album, "Pero Ya No" charted at number 63 on the US Billboard Hot 100 dated March 14, 2020, becoming the sixth-highest charting track from YHLQMDLG as well as peaking at number 8 on the US Hot Latin Songs chart upon the issue date of March 14, 2020. In Spain, "Pero Ya No" reached at number 14.

== Audio visualizer ==
A visualizer video for the song was uploaded to YouTube on February 29, 2020, along with the other visualizer videos of the songs that appeared on YHLQMDLG.

== Music video ==
A music video for "Pero Ya No" was released on March 3, 2020 on YouTube.

== In politics ==
Bad Bunny, criticizing then-President Donald Trump, allowed thirty seconds of the song to be used in a political ad for Joe Biden's 2020 presidential campaign. That August, the half-minute ad ran in Arizona, Florida and Pennsylvania, for their large numbers of registered Puerto Rican voters. The chorus, with its lines "Antes yo te quería pero ya no / Tú me gustabas pero ya no" ("Before, I loved you, but not anymore / I used to like you, but not anymore"), assisted footage from several Trump rallies, interspersed with shots of detained immigrant children, protestors facing off with riot police with Trump sternly holding a Bible, COVID-19 first responders with cadavers, Trump tossing rolls of paper towels to Puerto Ricans after Hurricane Maria, and other negative footage such as empty tiers of seats in the auditorium of Trump's 2020 rally in Tulsa, Oklahoma.

== Charts ==
=== Weekly charts ===
Chart performance for "Pero Ya No"
| Chart (2020) | Peak position |
|---|---|
| Spain (PROMUSICAE) | 14 |
| US Billboard Hot 100 | 63 |
| US Hot Latin Songs (Billboard) | 8 |

=== Year-end charts ===
| Chart (2020) | Position |
|---|---|
| US Hot Latin Songs (Billboard) | 49 |

== Certifications ==
Certifications and sales for "Pero Ya No"
| Region | Certification | Certified units/sales |
|---|---|---|
| Spain (PROMUSICAE) | Platinum | 60,000^{‡} |
^{‡} Sales+streaming figures based on certification alone.
