= List of Billboard Hot Latin Songs and Latin Airplay number ones of 2020 =

The Billboard Hot Latin Songs and Latin Airplay are charts that rank the best-performing Latin songs in the United States and are both published weekly by Billboard magazine. The Hot Latin Songs ranks the best-performing Spanish-language songs in the country based on digital downloads, streaming, and airplay from all radio stations. The Latin Airplay chart ranks the most-played songs on Spanish-language radio stations in the United States.

== Chart history ==
Chart history
Issue date	Hot Latin Songs			Latin Airplay		
Issue date	Title	Artist(s)	Ref.	Title	Artist(s)	Ref.
January 4	"Ritmo (Bad Boys for Life)"	The Black Eyed Peas and J Balvin		"Caballero"	Alejandro Fernández	
January 11	"Ritmo (Bad Boys for Life)"	The Black Eyed Peas and J Balvin		"Caballero"	Alejandro Fernández	
January 18	"Ritmo (Bad Boys for Life)"	The Black Eyed Peas and J Balvin		"Escondidos"	La Adictiva Banda San Jose de Mesillas	
January 25	"Ritmo (Bad Boys for Life)"	The Black Eyed Peas and J Balvin		"Que Tire Pa Lante"	Daddy Yankee	
February 1	"Tusa"	Karol G and Nicki Minaj		"Que Tire Pa Lante"	Daddy Yankee	
February 8	"Tusa"	Karol G and Nicki Minaj		"RITMO (Bad Boys For Life)"	The Black Eyed Peas and J Balvin	
February 15	"Tusa"	Karol G and Nicki Minaj		"Tusa"	Karol G & Nicki Minaj	
February 22	"Ritmo (Bad Boys for Life)"	The Black Eyed Peas and J Balvin		"Tusa"	Karol G & Nicki Minaj	
February 29	"Ritmo (Bad Boys for Life)"	The Black Eyed Peas and J Balvin		"Qué Pena"	Maluma and J Balvin	
March 7	"Ritmo (Bad Boys for Life)"	The Black Eyed Peas and J Balvin		"Tusa"	Karol G & Nicki Minaj	
March 14	"Si Veo a Tu Mamá"	Bad Bunny		"Vete"	Bad Bunny	
March 21	"Ritmo (Bad Boys for Life)"	The Black Eyed Peas and J Balvin		"Blanco"	J Balvin	
March 28	"Ritmo (Bad Boys for Life)"	The Black Eyed Peas and J Balvin		"Subelo (Further Up)"	Static & Ben El & Pitbull	
April 4	"Ritmo (Bad Boys for Life)"	The Black Eyed Peas and J Balvin		"Muévelo"	Nicky Jam & Daddy Yankee	
April 11	"Ritmo (Bad Boys for Life)"	The Black Eyed Peas and J Balvin		"Fantasia"	Ozuna	
April 18	"Ritmo (Bad Boys for Life)"	The Black Eyed Peas and J Balvin		"Me Quedare Contigo"	Pitbull & Ne-Yo featuring Lenier & El Micha	
April 25	"Ritmo (Bad Boys for Life)"	The Black Eyed Peas and J Balvin		"Morado"	J Balvin	
May 2	"Ritmo (Bad Boys for Life)"	The Black Eyed Peas and J Balvin		"Keii"	Anuel AA	
May 9	"Ritmo (Bad Boys for Life)"	The Black Eyed Peas and J Balvin		"Tusa"	Karol G & Nicki Minaj	
May 16	"Ritmo (Bad Boys for Life)"	The Black Eyed Peas and J Balvin		"Tusa"	Karol G & Nicki Minaj	
May 23	"Ritmo (Bad Boys for Life)"	The Black Eyed Peas and J Balvin		"Sigues Con Él"	Arcángel x Sech	
May 30	"Ritmo (Bad Boys for Life)"	The Black Eyed Peas and J Balvin		"Definitivamente"	Daddy Yankee & Sech	
June 6	"Ritmo (Bad Boys for Life)"	The Black Eyed Peas and J Balvin		"Yo Perreo Sola"	Bad Bunny	
June 13	"Ritmo (Bad Boys for Life)"	The Black Eyed Peas and J Balvin		"Yo Perreo Sola"	Bad Bunny	
June 20	"Ritmo (Bad Boys for Life)"	The Black Eyed Peas and J Balvin		"Mamacita"	The Black Eyed Peas, Ozuna & J.Rey Soul	
June 27	"Ritmo (Bad Boys for Life)"	The Black Eyed Peas and J Balvin		"Si Me Dices Que Si"	Reik, Farruko & Camilo	
July 4	"Ritmo (Bad Boys for Life)"	The Black Eyed Peas and J Balvin		"TBT"	Sebastián Yatra, Rauw Alejandro & Manuel Turizo	
July 11	"Ritmo (Bad Boys for Life)"	The Black Eyed Peas and J Balvin		"ADMV"	Maluma	
July 18	"Mamacita"	Black Eyed Peas, Ozuna and J. Rey Soul		"Rojo"	J Balvin	
July 25	"Mamacita"	Black Eyed Peas, Ozuna and J. Rey Soul		"Carita de Inocente"	Prince Royce	
August 1	"Mamacita"	Black Eyed Peas, Ozuna and J. Rey Soul		"La Dificil"	Bad Bunny	
August 8	"Un Día (One Day)"	J Balvin, Dua Lipa, Bad Bunny and Tainy		"Fútbol y Rumba"	Anuel AA and Enrique Iglesias	
August 15	"Un Día (One Day)"	J Balvin, Dua Lipa, Bad Bunny and Tainy		"Caramelo"	Ozuna, Karol G, and Myke Towers	
August 22	"Un Día (One Day)"	J Balvin, Dua Lipa, Bad Bunny and Tainy		"Caramelo"	Ozuna, Karol G, and Myke Towers	
August 29	"Un Día (One Day)"	J Balvin, Dua Lipa, Bad Bunny and Tainy		"Porfa"	Feid, J Balvin, Maluma, Nicky Jam, Sech, and Justin Quiles	
September 5	"Un Día (One Day)"	J Balvin, Dua Lipa, Bad Bunny and Tainy		"Agua"	Tainy and J Balvin	
September 12	"Hawái"	Maluma		"Tattoo Remix"	Rauw Alejandro and Camilo	
September 19	"Hawái"	Maluma		"Caramelo"	Ozuna, Karol G, and Myke Towers	
September 26	"Hawái"	Maluma		"Relación"	Sech, Daddy Yankee and J Balvin featuring Rosalía & Farruko	
October 3	"Hawái"	Maluma		"Hawái"	Maluma	
October 10	"Hawái"	Maluma		"Ay, Dios Mio!"	Karol G	
October 17	"Hawái"	Maluma		"Un Día (One Day)"	J Balvin, Dua Lipa, Bad Bunny and Tainy	
October 24	"Hawái"	Maluma		"Hawái"	Maluma	
October 31	"Hawái"	Maluma		"Hawái"	Maluma	
November 7	"Hawái"	Maluma		"Hawái"	Maluma	
November 14	"Dakiti"	Bad Bunny and Jhay Cortez		"Feel the Beat"	Black Eyed Peas and Maluma	
November 21	"Dakiti"	Bad Bunny and Jhay Cortez		"Gistro Amarillo"	Ozuna and Wisin	
November 28	"Dakiti"	Bad Bunny and Jhay Cortez		"La Toxica"	Farruko	
December 5	"Dakiti"	Bad Bunny and Jhay Cortez		"La Santa"	Bad Bunny and Daddy Yankee	
December 12	"Dakiti"	Bad Bunny and Jhay Cortez		"Te Quiero Baby"	Chesca, Pitbull and Frankie Valli	
December 19	"Dakiti"	Bad Bunny and Jhay Cortez		"Pa' Ti"	Jennifer Lopez and Maluma	
December 26	"Dakiti"	Bad Bunny and Jhay Cortez		"Dakiti"	Bad Bunny and Jhay Cortez	

== Hot Latin Songs weeks at number one ==
=== Songs ===
Number of weeks	Song	Artist(s)
24	"Ritmo (Bad Boys for Life)"	The Black Eyed Peas and J Balvin
9	"Hawái"	Maluma
7	"Dakiti"	Bad Bunny and Jhay Cortez
5	"Un Día (One Day)"	J Balvin, Dua Lipa, Bad Bunny and Tainy
3	"Mamacita"	Black Eyed Peas, Ozuna and J. Rey Soul
3	"Tusa"	Karol G and Nicki Minaj
1	"Si Veo a Tu Mamá"	Bad Bunny

=== Artists ===
Number of weeks	Artist	Number of songs
29	J Balvin	2
27	The Black Eyed Peas	2
13	Bad Bunny	3
9	Maluma	1
7	Jhay Cortez	1
5	Dua Lipa	1
5	Tainy	1
3	Karol G	1
3	Nicki Minaj	1
3	Ozuna	1
3	J. Rey Soul	1

== See also ==
- 2020 in Latin music
- List of artists who reached number one on the U.S. Latin Songs chart
- List of number-one Billboard Latin Albums from the 2020s
