= Ignorantes =

2020 single by Bad Bunny and Sech

Single by Bad Bunny and Sech

from the album YHLQMDLG
- Language: Spanish
- English title: "Ignorant"
- Released: 13 February 2020
- Genre: Reggaeton
- Length: 3:31
- Label: Rimas
- Songwriters: Benito Martínez; Carlos Morales; Jorge Valdes; Eduardo Soteldo, Sr.
- Producers: Dímelo Flow; Soteldo Beats

Bad Bunny singles chronology
"Vete" (2019)	"Ignorantes" (2020)	"La Difícil" (2020)

Sech singles chronology
"Definitivamente" (2020)	"Ignorantes" (2020)	"Relación" (2020)

Music video
- "Ignorantes" on YouTube

"Ignorantes" (transl. "Ignorant") is a song by Puerto Rican rapper Bad Bunny and Panamanian singer Sech. It was released on February 13, 2020, through Rimas Entertainment. as the second single from Bad Bunny's second solo studio album YHLQMDLG (2020). The song debuted and peaked at number 3 on the Billboard Hot Latin Songs chart and peaked at number 49 on the Billboard Hot 100.

== Composition and lyrics ==
"Ignorantes" is the first collaboration between Bad Bunny and Sech. The lyrics describe a person who laments a former lover but admits that the relationship wasn't taken seriously. The song contains an interpolation of the 2007 track "No Sé Si Fue" by Arcángel and Zion.

== Music video ==
The music video was released alongside the single on February 13, 2020. It was directed by Cliqua and Stillz. The video showcases different types of couples that represent various races and sexual orientations as it follows closely with the song's theme about ignorant love. Bad Bunny and Sech are also featured in the music video. The video has amassed over 130 million views on YouTube as of June 2020.

== Live performances ==
Bad Bunny and Sech performed "Ignorantes" on The Tonight Show Starring Jimmy Fallon on February 27, 2020. The performance saw Bad Bunny call attention to the murder of Alexa Negrón Luciano, a homeless transgender woman who was killed in San Juan, Puerto Rico in a hate crime four days prior to the performance. Bad Bunny wore a long skirt and a pink jacket during that performance to honor Negrón, as well as a shirt that said "Mataron a Alexa, no a un hombre con falda" (transl. "They killed Alexa, not a man in a skirt"), referring to initial police reports that Negrón was a man in a skirt.

== Charts ==
=== Weekly charts ===
Chart (2020)	Peak position
Argentina (Argentina Hot 100)	29
Chile (Monitor Latino)	13
Dominican Republic (SODINPRO)	9
Italy (FIMI)	100
Mexican Streaming Chart (AMPROFON)	8
Panama (Monitor Latino)	3
Spain (PROMUSICAE)	4
Switzerland (Schweizer Hitparade)	48
US Billboard Hot 100	49
US Hot Latin Songs (Billboard)	3

Chart (2026)	Peak position
Portugal (AFP)	16

=== Year-end charts ===
Chart (2020)	Position
Spain (PROMUSICAE)	50
US Hot Latin Songs (Billboard)	17

== Certifications ==
Region	Certification	Certified units/sales
Spain (Promusicae)	2× Platinum	80,000^{‡}
United States (RIAA)	15× Platinum (Latin)	900,000^{‡}
^{‡} Sales+streaming figures based on certification alone.
