= Safaera =

2020 song by Bad Bunny, Jowell & Randy and Ñengo Flow

Song by Bad Bunny, Jowell & Randy and Ñengo Flow

from the album YHLQMDLG
- Language: Spanish
- Released: February 29, 2020
- Recorded: 2019–2020
- Genre: Alternative reggaeton; dembow; experimental
- Length: 4:55
- Label: Rimas
- Songwriters: Benito Martínez; Joel Muñoz; Randy Ortiz; Edwin Rosa; Melissa Elliott; Timothy Mosley; Robert Marley; Josías de la Cruz; José Cosculluela; Marco Masís
- Producers: DJ Orma; Tainy

Audio video
- "Safaera" on YouTube

"Safaera" (a Puerto Rican expression for "promiscuity, debauchery or substance abuse") is a song by Puerto Rican rappers Bad Bunny and Ñengo Flow, and Puerto Rican duo Jowell & Randy. It was released on February 29, 2020, as the 14th track of Bad Bunny's second studio album, YHLQMDLG.

The song reached number one in Spain in its fifth week, becoming Bad Bunny's seventh song, as well as Jowell & Randy's and Ñengo Flow's first song to peak atop the charts.

== Background ==
Bad Bunny and Jowell had previously talked about a collaboration in the past, in a time when Bad Bunny was recording mostly trap songs, a genre that Jowell dislikes. They said to each other that they would work together if one of them was willing to make either a trap or a reggaeton track. A year later, after listening to Bad Bunny's "Mía" featuring Canadian singer Drake, Jowell liked the single's style and called Rimas Music to arrange a recording session with him, but he was very busy at the time. Three weeks before the release of YHLQMDLG, Bad Bunny called Jowell & Randy, who were in Puerto Rico, in order to work together for the album. "Safaera" was produced by Latin Grammy Award-winner Tainy and Bad Bunny's disc jockey DJ Orma.

In March 2020, the song inspired the "SafaeraChallenge" and the "#AbuelaChallenge", both of which went viral on the app TikTok. The latter saw especially elderly people dancing to the song while being placed in quarantine due to COVID-19.

== Composition ==
Due to its structural complexity, the song was described as a "reggaetón symphony and perreo megamix". During its course, the song "ventures through at least eight beat changes, five different rap flows, and 10+ years of references". The track makes use of numerous samples throughout its runtime, which include a guitar riff from "Get Ur Freak On" by Missy Elliott, the rhythm tracks from "Big Up" by Shaggy and Rayvon, "Santa Barbara" by Chaka Demus & Pliers, synths from DJ Nelson's and DJ Goldy's Xtassy Reggae, an opening line from Cosculluela's "Pa' La Pared" and a sample from Alexis & Fido's "El Tiburón", among others.

== Critical reception ==
The song received widespread acclaim from music critics. In a review for Pitchfork, Isabelia Herrera awarded the song the accolade "Best New Track" and went on to describe the track as "a technical masterpiece" in which the artist "harnesses this musical nostalgia and transforms it into an antidote for the most formulaic tendencies of the pop-reggaetón panorama". Griselda Flores of Billboard picked the song as one of the album's essential tracks, saying that the rapper "takes it way back with this old-school reggaetón song" and praised it for "its contagious beats", as well as "Missy Elliott's famous riff from 'Get Your Freak On'". Rolling Stone's Suzy Exposito referred to the song as "five-minutes of unadulterated chaos" and opined that Bad Bunny "gets to ride a wave of reggaeton he was much too young to participate in the first time around".

NPR ranked it as the 5th best song of 2020, and Rolling Stone ranked it as the 15th best of the year. In 2021, Rolling Stone added "Safaera" to their list of "500 Greatest Songs of All Time," ranking it at #329. In September 2024, Pitchfork included "Safaera" on their list of "The 100 Best Songs of the 2020s So Far", ranking it at number 17.

== Copyright controversy ==
On May 14, 2020, "Safaera" was removed from Spotify. Bad Bunny claimed on a live video with Residente that he knew the reason behind the removal but preferred not to talk about it to avoid controversy. It was added back to the platform on May 15, the following day. Spotify then stated that it was due to a sample clearance. In an interview uploaded on YouTube on March 9, 2022, on Jorge A. Pabón Ocasio's channel MoluscoTV in which he interviews Jowell, he recounts that Missy Elliott asked for millions of dollars for copyright in the song. In the end, Noah Assad, founder of the record label Rimas Entertainment, had to intervene, who managed to reach an agreement with Elliott where Bad Bunny, Jowell, Randy and Ñengo Flow would only receive 1% of the total profits. However, despite this, Elliott later called out Jowell for misrepresenting what the actual song splits look like, writing to him on Twitter and saying, "Sadly you mislead all these people to make them think I have 99%. Now I don’t talk business online because that’s messy, but now we are here I have 25% and there is 6 other samples & 15 other writers on this one song. They got [a] percentage also…".

== Live performances ==
Bad Bunny performed the song as part of his Super Bowl halftime show.

== Charts ==
=== Weekly charts ===
| Chart (2020) | Peak position |
|---|---|
| Argentina Hot 100 (Billboard) | 4 |
| Colombia (Monitor Latino) | 8 |
| Dominican Republic (SODINPRO) | 28 |
| El Salvador (Monitor Latino) | 12 |
| Global 200 (Billboard) | 186 |
| Honduras (Monitor Latino) | 1 |
| Mexican Streaming (AMPROFON) | 1 |
| Nicaragua (Monitor Latino) | 2 |
| Spain (PROMUSICAE) | 1 |
| Paraguay (SGP) | 1 |
| Peru (Monitor Latino) | 3 |
| US Billboard Hot 100 | 81 |
| US Hot Latin Songs (Billboard) | 4 |
| US Rolling Stone Top 100 | 49 |

| Chart (2026) | Peak position |
|---|---|
| Global 200 (Billboard) | 80 |
| Greece International (IFPI) | 88 |
| Portugal (AFP) | 88 |
| US Hot Latin Rhythm Songs (Billboard) | 12 |

=== Year-end charts ===
| Chart (2020) | Position |
|---|---|
| US Hot Latin Songs (Billboard) | 5 |

== Certifications ==
| Region | Certification | Certified units/sales |
|---|---|---|
| Italy (FIMI) | Gold | 50,000^{‡} |
| Spain (Promusicae) | 4× Platinum | 240,000^{‡} |
| United States (RIAA) | 21× Platinum (Latin) | 1,260,000^{‡} |
^{‡} Sales+streaming figures based on certification alone.
