= Qué Pena =

2019 song by Colombian singers Maluma and J Balvin

Single by Maluma and J Balvin
- Language: Spanish
- English title: "Too Bad"
- Released: 27 September 2019
- Genre: Reggaeton; Tango music
- Length: 3:33
- Label: Sony Music Latin
- Songwriters: Juan Luis Londoño; Jose Álvaro Osorio Balvin; Edgar Barrera; Alejandro Ramírez; Wissem Larfaoui
- Producers: Sky Rompiendo; Edge

Maluma singles chronology
"No Se Me Quita" (2019)	"Qué Pena" (2019)	"Así Así" (2019)

J Balvin singles chronology
"La Canción" (2019)	"Qué Pena" (2019)	"Ritmo (Bad Boys for Life)" (2019)

"Qué Pena" is a song by Colombian singers Maluma and J Balvin. The single and its music video were released on September 27, 2019.

== Background ==
Maluma and J Balvin announced their collaboration on "Qué Pena" on their social media accounts on August 20, 2019. This song is the first original collaboration between the two Colombian singers, after Maluma joined J Balvin on the remix of the latter and Nicky Jam's hit song "X."

== Composition and lyrics ==
"Qué Pena" is an urban fusion track that contains elements of EDM and tango music. It is described as a seductive track in which Maluma and J Balvin try to convince a woman who they have met before to go out with them, only to feel embarrassed about the situation. They seem to remember her face, but not her name.

== Music video ==
The music video for "Qué Pena" was directed by Colin Tilley and was filmed in New York City. The video shows Maluma and J Balvin making fun of each other as they attend a private party, where they both meet a woman who they can't fully seem to remember, but they are shown to have a good time regardless. The video has over 180 million views on YouTube as of May 2020.

== Charts ==
=== Weekly charts ===
Chart (2019)	Peak position
US Hot Latin Songs (Billboard)	13
US Latin Airplay (Billboard)	1
US Latin Rhythm Airplay (Billboard)	1

=== Year-end charts ===
Chart (2020)	Position
US Hot Latin Songs (Billboard)	68

== Certifications ==
Region	Certification	Certified units/sales
Brazil (Pro-Música Brasil)	Platinum	40,000^{‡}
Mexico (AMPROFON)	3× Platinum	180,000^{‡}
Portugal (AFP)	Gold	5,000^{‡}
Spain (Promusicae)	Platinum	100,000^{‡}
^{‡} Sales+streaming figures based on certification alone.

== See also ==
- List of Billboard number-one Latin songs of 2020
