= YHLQMDLG =

2020 studio album by Bad Bunny

Studio album by Bad Bunny
- Released: February 29, 2020
- Recorded: 2019–2020
- Genres: Latin hip hop; Latin trap; reggaeton; alternative reggaeton
- Length: 65:48
- Language: Spanish
- Label: Rimas
- Producers: Albert Hype; Bad Bunny; Based1; Chris Jedi; Demy & Clipz; Dez Wright; Dímelo Flow; DJ Orma; Elikai; EMG; EZ Made da Beat; Frank King; Forthenight; Gaby Music; Haze; Hazen; Hide Miyabi; Jota Rosa; Lennex; Mora; Mvsis; Nesty; Dímelo Ninow; Payday; Prida; Soteldo Beats; Súbelo NEO; Taiko; Tainy; The Skybeats

Bad Bunny chronology
Oasis (2019)	YHLQMDLG (2020)	Las que no iban a salir (2020)

Singles from YHLQMDLG
- 1. "Vete" Released: November 22, 2019; 2. "Ignorantes" Released: February 14, 2020; 3. "La Difícil" Released: February 29, 2020; 4. "Si Veo a Tu Mamá" Released: March 2, 2020; 5. "Pero Ya No" Released: March 3, 2020; 6. "Hablamos Mañana" Released: March 5, 2020; 7. "Bichiyal" Released: March 13, 2020; 8. "Yo Perreo Sola" Released: March 27, 2020; 9. "Una Vez" Released: September 20, 2020

YHLQMDLG (acronym for "Yo Hago Lo Que Me Da La Gana", Spanish: [ɟʝo ˈaɣo lo ke me ˈða la ˈɣana]; transl. I Do Whatever I Want) is the second solo studio album and third overall by Puerto Rican rapper and singer Bad Bunny. It was released on February 29, 2020, by Rimas Entertainment. The album's music style is heavily influenced by "old-school" reggaeton, and features guest appearances from Daddy Yankee, Nesi, Yaviah, Ñengo Flow, Sech, Mora, Jowell & Randy, Anuel AA, Myke Towers, Kendo Kaponi, Arcángel, Duki and Pablo Chill-E.

The album debuted at number two on the US Billboard 200, becoming the highest-charting all-Spanish album ever on the chart at the time, until the release of his third album, El Último Tour Del Mundo. YHLQMDLG was the best selling Latin album in the United States of 2020, became Spotify's most streamed album globally of 2020, and won for Best Latin Pop or Urban Album at the 63rd Annual Grammy Awards.

== Background and singles ==
"Vete" was released as the lead single of the album on November 22, 2019. The album title was first mentioned during a sequence of the accompanying music video. The second single "Ignorantes" with Panamanian singer Sech came out on February 14, 2020. Bad Bunny announced the album on February 27, 2020, and stated that it would be released on Leap Day 2020.

== Composition ==
YHLQMDLG is a primarily a Latin trap and reggaeton album that also incorporates elements of pop, rock, hip-hop, R&B, reggae, dancehall, ballad, acoustic, electronic, lo-fi, bachata, dembow, and sandungueo. Billboard had described the album as an "old-school perreo, romantic reggaeton, and Latin trap with global appeal. It is a departure from Bad Bunny's Latin trap style showcased on his very beginnings and focuses more on fun, bouncy, and aggressive reggaeton beats, and lyrics. Bad Bunny's vision for the album was for it to bring back the “glory days” of reggaeton, drawing inspiration from it, like the song “Safaera”, which is a heavy, 00's-inspired, beat switching described as "reggaeton symphony", which features Puerto Rican duo Jowell y Randy and Nengo Flow. The album also features Latin trap sounds, incorporating the widely known 808 drum patterns, and both fun and aggressive melodies, such as in “Si Veo A Tu Mama”, which samples the bossa-nova classic "The Girl from Ipanema", featuring a sweet, Nintendo-ish keyboard sound, while the song “25/8” is an example of the dark, hard-hitting melodies that some of the trap songs in the record share. Lyrically, Bad Bunny raps and sings about themes such as women, partying, heartbreak, and women's empowerment, an example of it is the song “Yo Perreo Sola”, which talks about a girl whom Bad Bunny wants to dance with, but she refuses, because according to her, Bad Bunny also refused to dance with her in the past, so now he is the one who is "begging". In the last track of the album, “<3”, Bad Bunny thanks all his fans and a team of work for supporting and believing in him, while also expressing his desire to retire and live with no more stress, closing both the song and album with the title of the record.

== Critical reception ==
Professional ratings
Aggregate scores
Source	Rating
Metacritic	88/100
Review scores
Source	Rating
AllMusic	4/5 stars
Consequence of Sound	B+
Pitchfork	8.5/10
Rolling Stone	4.5/5 stars

YHLQMDLG received widespread critical acclaim. At Metacritic, which assigns a normalised rating out of 100 to reviews from mainstream critics, the album has an average score of 88 based on five reviews, indicating "universal acclaim".

Writing for AllMusic, Thom Jurek stated Bad Bunny "turns the notion of the cohesive urban statement into a sprawling 20-track mix of styles, production techniques, and completely accessible hooks in a work of peerless musical invention," and described YHLQMDLG as "a transformative fever dream of an album that accents freedom by breaking all the rules without writing new ones." In Rolling Stone, Suzy Exposito gave YHLQMDLG 4.5 stars, writing that Bad Bunny "convenes a family reunion of his favorite rappers and reggaetoneros to produce a genre-promiscuous work of reggaeton a la marquesina." For Consequence of Sound, Lucas Villa wrote that Bad Bunny "is emerging as a rarity in the game like the mythical Mew. Benito is game-sharking a system that was once othering Latin music artists with his perreo takeover of pop." Matthew Ismael Ruiz in Pitchfork deemed the album "outstanding" and described it as "a big party record that pushes boundaries and pays homage to reggaetón's past and future, all made by a swaggering star with absolutely nothing to prove."

=== Accolades ===
Accolades for YHLQMDLG
Publication	List	Rank	Ref.
Billboard	The 50 Best Albums of 2020	4	
Complex	The Best Albums of 2020	16	
Entertainment Weekly	The 15 Best albums of 2020	5	
NPR	The 50 Best Albums of 2020	5	
Pitchfork	The 50 Best Albums of 2020	10	
Rolling Stone	The 50 Best Albums of 2020	3	
The New York Times	Best Albums of 2020 (Jon Caramanica)	8	
Consequence of Sound	Top 50 Albums of 2020	6	
Crack	The Top 50 Albums of 2020	9	
Pitchfork	The 100 Best Rap Albums of All Time	67	

== Commercial performance ==
YHLQMDLG debuted at number two on the US Billboard 200 dated March 14, 2020, earning 179,000 album-equivalent units, including 35,000 pure album sales in its first week. It earned 201.4 million on-demand streams in the country, achieving the biggest streaming week ever for a Latin album, surpassing the record set by Ozuna's Aura (2018, 53.2 million streams). It became the highest-charting all-Spanish album to ever appear on the chart at the time—before he broke his own record with El Último Tour Del Mundo's release in November, which debuted atop the chart. Previous record-holders for an all-Spanish-language albums were Shakira's Fijación Oral, Vol. 1 (2005) and Maná's Amar es Combatir (2006), both at number four, while two mostly-Spanish albums have reached number one, Selena's Dreaming of You (1995) and Il Divo's Ancora (2006). In its second week, the album dropped to number three on the chart, earning an additional 111,000 units. In its third week, the album remained at number three on the chart, earning 69,000 more units. In its fourth week, the album fell to number four on the chart, with 51,000 units. YHLGMLG was the best selling Latin Album of 2020 in the United States with 1,444,000 album-equivalent units. In 2021 and 2022, it was the second best selling latin album with 755,000 and 802,000 units moved respectively. As of April 2024, the album has shifted 2 million album-equivalent units worldwide.

Bad Bunny charted all 20 album tracks on the US Hot Latin Songs ranking dated March 14, setting several records: most concurrently charting titles in the top 10 (8), in the top 20 (18) and in the top 25 (20). With eight top 10 songs on the chart, Bad Bunny outdid himself as he previously held the record for the most simultaneous top 10s, with six (September 2019). With 18 songs in the top 20, he surpassed J Balvin's nine-song mark (February 2020). Both Bad Bunny and Ozuna have placed 20 songs simultaneously on the chart. Bad Bunny brought his total career entries on the chart to a record 83, surpassing Daddy Yankee's 74 entries.

Bad Bunny also placed 11 album tracks simultaneously on the US Billboard Hot 100, the most for any Latin artist performing only in Spanish. YHLQMDLG became Spotify's most streamed album globally of 2020, with 3.3 billion streams during the year.

In Spain, the album debuted at number one on the charts. It was the most popular and most streamed album of 2020 in Spain.

== Awards and nominations ==
Award	Year	Category	Result	Ref.
American Music Awards	2020	Favorite Album – Latin	Won	
Grammy Awards	2021	Best Latin Pop or Urban Album	Won	
Latin Grammy Awards	2020	Album of the Year	Nominated	
Latin Grammy Awards	2020	Best Urban Music Album	Nominated	
Premios Lo Nuestro	2021	Album of the Year	Won	
Premios Lo Nuestro	2021	Urban Album of the Year	Won	
Billboard Latin Music Awards	2021	Top Latin Album of the Year	Won	
Billboard Latin Music Awards	2021	Latin Rhythm Album of the Year	Won	

== Track listing ==
YHLQMDLG track listing
No.	Title	Writer(s)	Producer(s)	Length
1.	"Si Veo a Tu Mamá"	Benito Martínez	Súbelo NEO; Elikai	2:50
2.	"La Difícil"	Martínez; Gabriel Mora; Jose Cruz; Freddy Montalvo; Jesus Prato	Súbelo NEO; Lennex; Mora	2:43
3.	"Pero Ya No"	Martínez; Cruz; Montalvo; Dylan Cleary-Krell; Emanuel Gonzalez	Súbelo NEO; EMG; Dez Wright	2:40
4.	"La Santa" (featuring Daddy Yankee)	Martínez; Ramón Ayala; Marco Masis	Tainy	3:26
5.	"Yo Perreo Sola" (featuring Nesi)	Martínez; Genesis Rios-Serrano; Cruz; Montalvo; Marco Masis	Bad Bunny; Tainy; Súbelo NEO	2:52
6.	"Bichiyal" (featuring Yaviah)	Martínez; Javier Marcano; Ernesto Padilla; Cruz; Montalvo	Nesty; Súbelo NEO	3:16
7.	"Soliá"	Martínez; Mora; Cruz; Montalvo; Etienne Gagnon; Steve Martinez	Súbelo NEO; Demy & Clipz; Mora	2:39
8.	"La Zona"	Martínez; Egbert Rosa; Carlos Ortiz; Juan Rivera; Nino Segarra	Chris Jedi; Gaby Music; Haze; Dímelo Ninow	2:16
9.	"Que Malo" (featuring Ñengo Flow)	Martínez; Edwin Rosa; Abner Boria; Michael Masis	Mvsis; Jota Rosa	2:47
10.	"Vete"	Martínez; Ivaniel Ortiz; Cruz; Montalvo; Cesar Batista-Escalera; Edgar Semper-Vergas; Xavier Semper-Vergas	Súbelo NEO; Hazen	3:12
11.	"Ignorantes" (featuring Sech)	Martínez; Carlos Morales; Eduardo Soteldo, Sr.; Jorge Valdes	Dímelo Flow; Soteldo Beats	3:30
12.	"A Tu Merced"	Martínez; Ezequiel Rivera; Henry De La Prida; Cruz; Montalvo	EZ Made da Beat; Prida; Súbelo NEO	2:55
13.	"Una Vez" (featuring Mora)	Martínez; Mora; Cruz; Montalvo; Nicolas Jana	Taiko	3:52
14.	"Safaera" (featuring Jowell & Randy and Ñengo Flow)	Martinez; Joel Munoz; Randy Ortiz; Rosa; Cruz; Montalvo; Lowell Dunbar; Lloyd Willis; Melissa Elliott; Timothy Mosley; Robert Marley; Ormani Perez; Shaun Pizzonia; Richard Lied; Felix Rodriguez; Marco Masis	Tainy; DJ Orma	4:55
15.	"25/8"	Martínez; Cruz; Montalvo; Kaled Rivera; Ben Sturdivant; Felix Rodriguez; Jason Garcia	Súbelo NEO; Hide Miyabi; Based1; Elikai	4:03
16.	"Está Cabrón Ser Yo" (featuring Anuel AA)	Martínez; Emmanuel Gazmey; Frank Packer; Harald Sorebo	Payday; Frank King	3:47
17.	"Puesto Pa' Guerrial" (featuring Myke Towers)	Martínez; Michael Torres; I. Ortiz; Cruz; Montalvo	Súbelo NEO; Hazen	3:10
18.	"P FKN R" (featuring Kendo Kaponi and Arcángel)	Martínez; José Rivera; Austin Santos; Charles Ocansey; Frederik Thrane	The Skybeats; Forthenight	4:18
19.	"Hablamos Mañana" (featuring Duki and Pablo Chill-E)	Martínez; Mauro Lombardo; Pablo Acevedo; Masis; Carlos Melendez	Tainy; Albert Hype	4:00
20.	"<3"	Martínez; Masis; Melendez	Tainy; Albert Hype	2:37
Total length:				65:48

Sample credits

- "Si Veo a Tu Mamá" contains interpolations from "The Girl from Ipanema", written by Antônio Carlos Jobim, Vinícius de Moraes and Norman Gimbel, performed by Stan Getz and João Gilberto.
- "La Santa" contains interpolations from "Aquí Está Tu Caldo", written and performed by Daddy Yankee.
- "Vete" contains interpolations from "Si Te Vas", written by Cesar Batista-Escalera, performed by Kartiel.
- "Ignorantes" contains interpolations from "No Sé Si Fue", written and performed by Arcángel and Zion.
- "Safaera" contains samples from "Get Ur Freak On", performed by Missy Elliott, "Could You Be Loved", performed by Bob Marley, "El Tiburón", performed by Alexis & Fido and an opening line from Cosculluela's "Pa' La Pared".

== Charts ==
=== Weekly charts ===
Chart performance for YHLQMDLG
Chart (2020)	Peak position
Belgian Albums (Ultratop Flanders)	62
Belgian Albums (Ultratop Wallonia)	75
Canadian Albums (Billboard)	17
Chilean Albums (TopCharts)	1
Dutch Albums (Album Top 100)	27
French Albums (SNEP)	79
Italian Albums (FIMI)	14
Spanish Albums (Promusicae)	4
Spanish Streaming Albums (PROMUSICAE)	1
Swedish Albums (Sverigetopplistan)	48
Swiss Albums (Schweizer Hitparade)	12
US Billboard 200	2
US Independent Albums (Billboard)	1
US Top Latin Albums (Billboard)	1
US Latin Rhythm Albums (Billboard)	1

Chart (2025–2026)	Peak position
Portuguese Albums (AFP)	9

=== Year-end charts ===
2020 year-end chart performance for YHLQMDLG
Chart (2020)	Position
Spanish Albums (PROMUSICAE)	1
US Billboard 200	14
US Independent Albums (Billboard)	1
US Top Latin Albums (Billboard)	1

2021 year-end chart performance for YHLQMDLG
Chart (2021)	Position
Spanish Albums (PROMUSICAE)	11
US Billboard 200	35
US Independent Albums (Billboard)	3
US Top Latin Albums (Billboard)	2

2022 year-end chart performance for YHLQMDLG
Chart (2022)	Position
Spanish Albums (PROMUSICAE)	7
US Billboard 200	36
US Independent Albums (Billboard)	5
US Top Latin Albums (Billboard)	2

2023 year-end chart performance for YHLQMDLG
Chart (2023)	Position
US Billboard 200	104
US Independent Albums (Billboard)	15
US Top Latin Albums (Billboard)	4

== Certifications ==
Sales certifications for YHLQMDLG
Region	Certification	Certified units/sales
Italy (FIMI)	Platinum	50,000^{‡}
Spain (Promusicae)	3× Platinum	120,000^{‡}
United States (RIAA)	24× Platinum (Latin)	1,440,000^{‡}
^{‡} Sales+streaming figures based on certification alone.

== See also ==
- 2020 in Latin music
- List of best-selling Latin albums
- List of number-one Billboard Latin Albums from the 2020s
- List of number-one Billboard Latin Rhythm Albums of 2021
- List of number-one Billboard Latin Rhythm Albums of 2022
