= Un Día (One Day) =

2020 single by J Balvin, Dua Lipa, Bad Bunny and Tainy

Single by J Balvin, Dua Lipa, Bad Bunny and Tainy
- Language: English; Spanish
- Released: July 23, 2020
- Recorded: 2019
- Genre: House; Latin pop; reggaeton
- Length: 3:51
- Label: Universal
- Composers: Daystar Peterson; Marco Masís; Alejandro Borrero; Ivanni Rodriguez
- Lyricists: Dua Lipa; José Álvaro Osorio Balvín; Benito Antonio Martínez Ocasio; Clarence Coffee Jr.
- Producer: Tainy

J Balvin singles chronology
"Anaranjado" (2020)	"Un Día (One Day)" (2020)	"Relación (remix)" (2020)

Dua Lipa singles chronology
"Hallucinate" (2020)	"Un Día (One Day)" (2020)	"Levitating (The Blessed Madonna remix)" (2020)

Bad Bunny singles chronology
"Cómo Se Siente (remix)" (2020)	"Un Día (One Day)" (2020)	"Una Vez" (2020)

Tainy singles chronology
"Agua" (2020)	"Un Día (One Day)" (2020)	"Falta" (2020)

Music video
- "Un Día (One Day)" on YouTube

"Un Día (One Day)" (Note: Stylized in all caps as a single, on Summer Vacation and on Jose.) is a song by Colombian singer J Balvin, English singer Dua Lipa, Puerto Rican rapper and singer Bad Bunny and Puerto Rican producer Tainy. Tainy produced the song, while he co-wrote it with Balvin, Lipa, Bad Bunny, Alejandro Borrero, Clarence Coffee Jr., Tory Lanez, and Ivanni Rodriguez. Universal Music Group released the song for digital download and streaming as a standalone single in various countries on July 23, 2020. It appears on J Balvin's second compilation extended play (EP), Summer Vacation (2020), his fifth studio album Jose (2021), and the reissue of Lipa's second studio album, Future Nostalgia: The Moonlight Edition (2021).

A house, Latin pop, and reggaeton song with dream pop melodies and dancehall flairs, "Un Día (One Day)" lyrically talks about emotions of nostalgia and longing between two alienated romantic partners over a somber piano riff. Critics praised the song's fusion of each participating artist's musical styles. The song placed on best of 2020 year-end lists published by Billboard, Idolator and Rolling Stone. It was nominated for Best Pop Duo/Group Performance at the 63rd Annual Grammy Awards. The song reached the top 10 on the charts in various Central American countries, and received multi-platinum certifications in the United States, Mexico, and Spain.

The black and white music video for "Un Día (One Day)", which was released on the same day as the song, features Úrsula Corberó dancing to it and contemplating a heartbreak. It was nominated for Best Music Video at the 46th People's Choice Awards. Lipa performed the song at her livestream concert Studio 2054, with Bad Bunny and J Balvin contributing their verses through a video.

== Background and release ==
Tainy conceived "Un Día (One Day)" in January 2019, and invited his NEON16 partner Lex Borrero to executive produce it with him. Tainy asked J Balvin to record vocals for the song. J Balvin, in turn, asked Dua Lipa to join it; he told New Zealand DJ Zane Lowe in an interview, "I'm grateful and happy to have Dua Lipa on it. It was a dream to me to work with her". Bad Bunny was the last addition to "Un Día (One Day)", recording his vocals during the same session in which "Callaíta", another 2019 collaboration between him and Tainy, was written. Tainy, J Balvin, Lipa, and Bad Bunny wrote the song alongside Alejandro Borrero, Clarence Coffee Jr., Daystar Peterson, and Ivanni Rodriguez. Tainy recorded the song and produced it, while Colin Leonard and Josh Gudwin handled the mastering (Note: Mastered at Sing Mastering in Atlanta, Georgia) and mixing, respectively. It was recorded in 2019.

In May 2020, a nine-second clip of Lipa singing over a reggaeton beat leaked online, leading to speculation about a potential collaboration. On July 21, 2020, she revealed that "Un Día (One Day)" would be released two days later, and shared a 30-second teaser of the music video, which included imagery of a statue disintegrating underwater that is surrounded by fishes, people on fire, a glowing rectangle, cityscapes, and fireworks. Universal Music Group released the song for digital download and streaming as a single in various countries on July 23. The record label released it for radio airplay in Italy the following day; Republic Records sent the song to contemporary hit and rhythmic contemporary stations in the United States on August 4, 2020. "Un Día (One Day)" appears as the first track on J Balvin's second compilation extended play (EP) Summer Vacation (2020), the 24th and final track on Balvin's fifth studio album Jose (2021), and as the 19th and final track on the reissue of Lipa's second studio album Future Nostalgia: The Moonlight Edition (2021).

== Music and lyrics ==
"Un Día (One Day)"
Set to a somber piano line and dream pop melodies, "Un Día (One Day)" is a blend of house, Latin pop, and reggaeton where Balvin, Lipa and Bad Bunny tell a story about two alienated lovers.

Musically, "Un Día (One Day)" is a midtempo house, Latin pop, and reggaeton song, with dream pop melodies, dancehall flairs, hip hop elements and Latin rhythms as well as a somber pop piano riff. Bad Bunny samples Puerto Rican singer Tito El Bambino and Jadiel's song "Sol, Playa y Arena" (2007) during his verse. Lyrically, the song has themes of nostalgia and longing emotions. A bilingual English and Spanish song, Lipa and J Balvin voice two alienated romantic partners as they employ a call and response technique on it. Bad Bunny narrates a hopeful future for them during his verse. Lipa sings the titular line, "One day you'll realize I'm more than your lover/I'm your friend", over a downtempo dembow. The lyrics are an expression of being unable to see "a good thing" even when it is right there; Bad Bunny and J Balvin try to court estranged ex-girlfriends by promising vacation trips to Marbella and Turks and Caicos.

== Reception ==
=== Critical ===
Entertainment Tonight's Liz Calvario described "Un Día (One Day)" as a flawless fusion of Lipa's pop-house musical style with J Balvin, Bad Bunny, and Tainy's critically acclaimed reggaeton music. Jessica Roiz of Billboard agreed it fuses "the best of both worlds". For the same magazine, Jason Lipshutz complimented the song for "simultaneously [showcasing] the complexities of its creators". Writing for Idolator, Mike Wass positively reviewed the song, describing it as a continuation of Lipa's "triumphant 2020". NME's Anna Rose named it "a breakup anthem for the summer". Ana Monroy Yglesias, a staff writer for Grammy.com, shared a similar opinion, stating that "Un Día (One Day)" is "a perfect 2020 summer jam", and praising its melancholy nature and "infectious, slowed down reggaetón beat". For Exclaim!, Antoine-Samuel Mauffette Alavo viewed the song as "genre-bending" while praising Balvin for proving to be "taking risks the whole way through" and concluding the Jose album "neatly" with the song.

In Clash, Robin Murray wrote that the artists collaborating is like a "genuine Avengers Assemble line up of 2k20 pop music", while also noting that each artist pushes and pulls the single in "exciting new directions". She went on to say that it "remains true" to Balvin's roots: "matching his latin culture heritage against house music, future-facing pop, and hip-hop". In his review of Jose, the reviewer thought that the four artists was a "somewhat odd casting". Stereogum writer Chris DeVille named "Un Día (One Day)" a "midtempo reggaeton pop-crossover ballad of sorts" and thought it was an "Event Song" he'd expect to hear in "ad campaigns, inspirational montages, and heavy Top 40 radio rotation". Variety's Jem Aswad thought it is "another great song to add to the catalogs of all four artists". The staff of The Face named the song a "bilingual banger" while stating that the blend of Latin rhythms and Lipa's "irresistible" pop sound is "a recipe that's destined for success".

=== Commercial ===
"Un Día (One Day)" debuted at its peak of number 72 on the UK Singles Chart issue dated August 6, 2020. On the US Billboard Hot 100, the song reached number 63, while it topped the US Hot Latin Songs and Latin Airplay charts. The Recording Industry Association of America (RIAA) certified the song quindecuple Platinum (Latin) in the US, which denotes 900,000 units based on sales and track-equivalent on-demand streams. "Un Día (One Day)" charted at number 70 on the Canadian Hot 100 and was certified Platinum by Music Canada. The song peaked within the top 10 of various national record charts, reaching number one in Costa Rica, number two in El Salvador, Nicaragua, and Panama, number three in Honduras, number five in Colombia, number six in Spain, number seven in both Chile and Guatemala, number nine in both Bolivia and the Dominican Republic, and number 10 in Poland. It was certified Diamond+quadrouple Platinum+Gold in Mexico, double Platinum in Spain, and Platinum in both Italy and Portugal.

=== Accolades ===
"Un Día (One Day)" has received several awards and nominations. The song was awarded winning songwriters awards at the ASCAP Latin Awards and Crossover Collaboration of the Year at the Premio Lo Nuestro 2021. At the 63rd Annual Grammy Awards, it was nominated for Best Pop Duo/Group Performance, which Billboard called "the process of normalizing non-English singles appearing in the pop categories at the Grammys" and viewed a surprising due to its commercial underperformance. The song was nominated for OMG Collaboration at the 2021 Premios Juventud and International Collaboration of the Year at the 2020 Premios MUSA. It was nominated for Best Latin at 2021 MTV Video Music Awards. "Un Día (One Day)" also placed on numerous best of 2020 year-end lists, including unranked ones by Billboard for best Latin music and Rolling Stone for pop collaborations. Billboard hailed it as 2020's 42nd best song while it placed at number 39 on Idolator's year-end list.

== Promotion ==
Stillz directed the music video for "Un Día (One Day)", which was filmed during the COVID-19 lockdowns. It stars Spanish actress Úrsula Corberó, who captured the footage on her own without the involvement of production assistance. The video was released on the same day as the song. The black and white clip does not feature appearances by J Balvin, Lipa, Bad Bunny or Tainy. It depicts Corberó passing a day by spinning in bed and dancing to "Un Día (One Day)" in her room, stressed over a relationship that has ended and trying to find happiness. Rose drew a connection between the video's storyline and the song's lyrics; she thought that while "going through life alone", the actress is "processing the [same] breakup that Lipa sings about on the track". It earned a nomination for the Music Video of 2020 award at the 46th People's Choice Awards and won Video with the Best Social Message at the 2021 Premios Juventud.

"Un Día (One Day)" was included as the 11th track on Lipa's set list for her livestream concert Studio 2054, held on November 27, 2020. She donned Versace attire and sang the song while sitting in a pink and red-hued dressing room; Bad Bunny and J Balvin contributed their verses through a video broadcast on a tube television set in the room's corner.

== Personnel ==
- J Balvin – executive production, vocals
- Dua Lipa – vocals
- Bad Bunny – vocals
- Tainy – vocals, production, recording
- Colin Leonard – mastering
- Josh Gudwin – mixing
- Elijah Marrett-Hitch – mix assisting

== Charts ==
=== Weekly charts ===
Weekly chart positions for "Un Día (One Day)"
Chart (2020)	Peak position
Argentina Hot 100 (Billboard)	22
Belgium (Ultratip Bubbling Under Flanders)	1
Belgium (Ultratop 50 Wallonia)	18
Bolivia (Monitor Latino)	9
Brazil (Top 100 Airplay)	93
Canada Hot 100 (Billboard)	70
Canada CHR/Top 40 (Billboard)	42
Canada Hot AC (Billboard)	40
Chile (Monitor Latino)	7
Colombia (National-Report)	5
Costa Rica (Monitor Latino)	1
Dominican Republic (Monitor Latino)	7
Dominican Republic (SODINPRO)	9
El Salvador (Monitor Latino)	2
France (SNEP)	144
Germany (GfK)	94
Global 200 (Billboard) (Note: The Billboard Global 200 chart was launched in September 2020. Therefore, "Un Día (One Day)" did not have a full run on the chart.)	30
Greece (IFPI)	38
Guatemala (Monitor Latino)	7
Honduras (Monitor Latino)	3
Hungary (Single Top 40)	36
Ireland (IRMA)	56
Italy (FIMI)	23
Mexico (Billboard Mexican Airplay)	3
Netherlands (Dutch Top 40)	13
Netherlands (Single Top 100)	24
New Zealand Hot Singles (RMNZ)	20
Nicaragua (Monitor Latino)	2
Panama (Monitor Latino)	2
Paraguay (Monitor Latino)	13
Peru (Monitor Latino)	11
Poland Airplay (ZPAV)	10
Portugal (AFP)	18
Portugal Airplay (AFP)	22
Puerto Rico (Monitor Latino)	14
Romania (Airplay 100)	31
San Marino (SMRRTV Top 50)	32
Slovakia Airplay (ČNS IFPI)	72
Spain (Promusicae)	6
Switzerland (Schweizer Hitparade)	30
UK Singles (Official Charts)	72
US Billboard Hot 100	63
US Hot Latin Songs (Billboard)	1
US Latin Airplay (Billboard)	1
US Pop Airplay (Billboard)	40
US Rhythmic Airplay (Billboard)	17
US Rolling Stone Top 100	42

=== Monthly charts ===
Monthly chart position for "Un Día (One Day)"
Chart (2020)	Peak position
Paraguay (SGP)	3

=== Year-end charts ===
2020 Year-end chart positions for "Un Día (One Day)"
Chart (2020)	Position
Argentina (Monitor Latino)	100
Guatemala (Monitor Latino)	88
Honduras (Monitor Latino)	60
Italy (FIMI)	80
Netherlands (Dutch Top 40)	66
Netherlands (Single Top 100)	95
Panama (Monitor Latino)	25
Paraguay (Monitor Latino)	54
Peru (Monitor Latino)	86
Poland (Polish Airplay Top 100)	24
Portugal (AFP)	97
Spain (PROMUSICAE)	47
US Hot Latin Songs (Billboard)	12
US Latin Airplay (Billboard)	29

2021 Year-end chart positions for "Un Día (One Day)"
Chart (2021)	Position
Global Excl. U.S. (Billboard)	175
Portugal (AFP)	109
US Hot Latin Songs (Billboard)	53

== Certifications ==
Certifications for "Un Día (One Day)"
Region	Certification	Certified units/sales
Australia (ARIA)	Gold	35,000^{‡}
Brazil (Pro-Música Brasil)	3× Platinum	120,000^{‡}
Canada (Music Canada)	Platinum	80,000^{‡}
Italy (FIMI)	Platinum	70,000^{‡}
Mexico (AMPROFON)	Diamond+4× Platinum+Gold	570,000^{‡}
Poland (ZPAV)	Platinum	50,000^{‡}
Portugal (AFP)	Platinum	10,000^{‡}
Spain (Promusicae)	3× Platinum	120,000^{‡}
United States (RIAA)	15× Platinum (Latin)	900,000^{‡}
^{‡} Sales+streaming figures based on certification alone.

== Release history ==
Release dates and formats for "Un Día (One Day)"
Region	Date	Format(s)	Label	Ref.
Various	July 23, 2020	Digital download; streaming	Universal	
Italy	July 24, 2020	Radio airplay	Universal	
United States	August 4, 2020	Contemporary hit radio	Republic	
United States	August 4, 2020	Rhythmic contemporary radio	Republic	

== See also ==
- List of Billboard Hot Latin Songs and Latin Airplay number ones of 2020
