= Muévelo (Nicky Jam and Daddy Yankee song) =

Single by Nicky Jam and Daddy Yankee

from the album Bad Boys for Life – The Soundtrack
- Language: Spanish
- English title: "Move It"
- Released: January 8, 2020
- Recorded: 2019
- Genre: Reggaeton
- Length: 3:15
- Label: Epic
- Songwriters: Ramón Luis Ayala Rodríguez; Nick Rivera Caminero; Juan "Play" Salinas; Oscar "Skillz" Salinas; Waldemar "WallyTMW" Cancel; Cecil Campbell; Kenton Nix; Salaam Remi Gibbs; Christophe Kenner; Charles Chavez; David Macías; Francisco Saldaña; Juan Diego Medina; Rafael Regginalds Aponte
- Producers: Play-N-Skillz; WallyTMW; Scott Summers; Daddy Yankee

Daddy Yankee singles chronology
"Que Tire Pa Lante" (2019)	"Muévelo" (2020)	"Definitivamente" (2020)

Music video
- "Muévelo" on YouTube

"Muévelo" ([ˈmweβelo], transl ."Move It") is a song by American singer Nicky Jam, and Puerto Rican rapper Daddy Yankee. It was released as the second single from Bad Boys for Life soundtrack. Produced by Play-N-Skillz, Scott Summers Wally The Mind Writer and Daddy Yankee, the song samples Ini Kamoze's "Here Comes the Hotstepper".

== Charts ==
=== Weekly charts ===
Chart (2020)	Peak position
Argentina Hot 100 (Billboard)	6
Bolivia (Monitor Latino)	1
Chile (Monitor Latino)	2
Colombia (National-Report)	2
Dominican Republic (SODINPRO)	5
Mexico Airplay (Billboard)	8
Mexican Pop Airplay (Billboard)	8
Puerto Rico (Monitor Latino)	1
Spain (PROMUSICAE)	12
Switzerland (Schweizer Hitparade)	68
US Bubbling Under Hot 100 (Billboard)	13
US Hot Latin Songs (Billboard)	10
US Latin Airplay (Billboard)	1
US Latin Rhythm Airplay (Billboard)	1
Venezuela (Monitor Latino)	3

=== Year-end charts ===
Chart (2020)	Position
Argentina Airplay (Monitor Latino)	11
US Hot Latin Songs (Billboard)	27

== Certifications ==
Region	Certification	Certified units/sales
Brazil (Pro-Música Brasil)	Gold	20,000^{‡}
Italy (FIMI)	Gold	35,000^{‡}
Mexico (AMPROFON)	3× Platinum+Gold	210,000^{‡}
Spain (Promusicae)	2× Platinum	120,000^{‡}
United States (RIAA)	3× Platinum (Latin)	180,000^{‡}
Streaming
Chile (Profovi)	Gold	14,000,000
^{‡} Sales+streaming figures based on certification alone.

== See also ==
- List of Billboard number-one Latin songs of 2020
