= Definitivamente (song) =

2020 song by Daddy Yankee and Sech

Single by Daddy Yankee and Sech
- Language: Spanish
- Released: January 31, 2020
- Genre: Reggaeton
- Length: 3:38
- Label: El Cartel Records; Universal
- Songwriters: Ramón Ayala; Carlos Isaías Morales Williams; Jorge Valdes Vasquez; Daniel Oveido; Nekxum
- Producers: Nekxum; Ovy on the Drums

Daddy Yankee singles chronology
"Muevelo" (2020)	"Definitivamente" (2020)	"Pam" (2020)

Sech singles chronology
"Sigues Con Él" (2019)	"Definitivamente" (2020)	"Ignorantes" (2020)

"Definitivamente" (in English: "Definitely") is a song by Puerto Rican rapper and singer Daddy Yankee and Panamanian singer Sech. The track peaked at number 15 on the US Billboard Hot Latin Songs chart.

== Charts ==
=== Weekly charts ===
Weekly chart performance for "Definitivamente"
Chart (2020)	Peak position
Argentina Hot 100 (Billboard)	43
Bolivia (Monitor Latino)	10
Chile (Monitor Latino)	10
Dominican Republic (Monitor Latino)	3
Honduras (Monitor Latino)	6
Mexican Airplay (Billboard)	6
Mexican Pop Airplay (Billboard)	11
Panama (Monitor Latino)	2
Paraguay (Monitor Latino)	9
Paraguay (SGP)	40
Puerto Rico (Monitor Latino)	1
Spain (PROMUSICAE)	31
US Hot Latin Songs (Billboard)	15
US Latin Airplay (Billboard)	1
US Latin Pop Airplay (Billboard)	3
US Latin Rhythm Airplay (Billboard)	1
Venezuela (Monitor Latino)	13

=== Year-end charts ===
2020 year-end chart performance for "Definitivamente"
Chart (2020)	Position
Bolivia Airplay (Monitor Latino)	62
Chile Airplay (Monitor Latino)	28
Colombia Streaming (Monitor Latino)	95
Dominican Republic Airplay (Monitor Latino)	27
Dominican Republic Streaming (Monitor Latino)	32
Ecuador Airplay (Monitor Latino)	88
Ecuador Streaming (Monitor Latino)	70
El Salvador Airplay (Monitor Latino)	43
El Salvador Streaming (Monitor Latino)	31
Guatemala Airplay (Monitor Latino)	50
Guatemala Streaming (Monitor Latino)	47
Mexico Airplay (Monitor Latino)	92
Mexico Streaming (Monitor Latino)	52
Nicaragua Airplay (Monitor Latino)	43
Panama Airplay (Monitor Latino)	2
Paraguay Airplay (Monitor Latino)	87
Puerto Rico Airplay (Monitor Latino)	6
Puerto Rico Streaming (Monitor Latino)	6
US Hot Latin Songs (Billboard)	55
Venezuela Airplay (Monitor Latino)	27

== Certifications ==
Certifications and sales for "Definitivamente"
Region	Certification	Certified units/sales
Spain (Promusicae)	Gold	30,000^{‡}
United States (RIAA)	2× Platinum (Latin)	120,000^{‡}
^{‡} Sales+streaming figures based on certification alone.

== See also ==
- List of Billboard number-one Latin songs of 2020
