= La Santa (song) =

Song by Bad Bunny featuring Daddy Yankee

from the album YHLQMDLG
- Language: Spanish
- Released: February 29, 2020
- Genre: Reggaeton
- Length: 3:26
- Label: Rimas
- Songwriters: Benito Martínez; Ramon Ayala; Marco Masis
- Producer: Tainy

Visualizer
- "BAD BUNNY x DADDY YANKEE - LA SANTA [Visualizer]" on YouTube

"La Santa" (English: "The Saint") is a song by Puerto Rican rapper Bad Bunny featuring guest vocals from Daddy Yankee from the former's third studio album YHLQMDLG (2020). The song was written by Benito Martínez, Ramon Ayala and Marco Masis with the latter handling the production as Tainy. "La Santa" contains interpolations from "Aquí Está Tu Caldo", written and performed by Daddy Yankee.

== Promotion and release ==
On February 28, 2020, Bad Bunny announced his third studio album that was revealed to be YHLQMDLG during his performance and guest appearance on The Tonight Show Starring Jimmy Fallon, which was released the following day.

== Commercial performance ==
Following the releasing of YHLQMDLG, "La Santa" charted at number 53 on the US Billboard Hot 100 dated March 14, 2020 as well as peaking at number 6 on the US Hot Latin Songs chart upon the same issue date. In Spain, "La Santa" reached at number 7.

== Audio visualizer ==
A visualizer video for the song was uploaded to YouTube on February 29, 2020, along with the other visualizer videos of the songs that appeared on YHLQMDLG.

== Charts ==
=== Weekly charts ===
Chart performance for "La Santa"
Chart (2020)	Peak position
Chile (Billboard)	25
Ecuador (Billboard)	14
Global 200 (Billboard)	151
Mexico (Billboard)	18
Peru (Billboard)	19
Spain (Promusicae)	7
US Billboard Hot 100	53
US Hot Latin Songs (Billboard)	6
US Latin Rhythm Airplay (Billboard)	1

=== Year-end charts ===
Chart (2020)	Position
US Hot Latin Songs (Billboard)	25

== Certifications ==
Certifications and sales for "La Santa"
Region	Certification	Certified units/sales
Spain (Promusicae)	3× Platinum	300,000^{‡}
United States (RIAA)	12× Platinum (Latin)	720,000^{‡}
^{‡} Sales+streaming figures based on certification alone.
