= Agua (Tainy and J Balvin song) =

Single by Tainy and J Balvin

from the album The SpongeBob Movie: Sponge On The Run (Original Motion Picture Soundtrack)
- Language: Spanish
- English title: "Water"
- Released: July 9, 2020
- Genre: Reggaeton
- Length: 2:38
- Label: NEON16; Interscope
- Songwriters: José Osorio Balvín; Jhay Cortez; Kevyn "Keityn" Cruz; Derek Drymon; Mark Harrison; Stephen Hillenburg; Marcos Masís; Alejandro "Sky" Ramírez; Blaise Smith
- Producer: Tainy

Tainy singles chronology
"Malos Habitos" (2020)	"Agua" (2020)	"Un Día (One Day)" (2020)

J Balvin singles chronology
"Negro" (2020)	"Agua" (2020)	"Anaranjado" (2020)

Music video
- "Agua" on YouTube

"Agua" (Spanish: "Water") is a song by Puerto Rican producer Tainy and Colombian singer J Balvin. The track was released on July 9, 2020 by NEON16 and Interscope Records as the theme song and lead single off the soundtrack to the 2020 film The SpongeBob Movie: Sponge on the Run. "Agua" is prominently characterized by a sample of the SpongeBob SquarePants theme song throughout the track.

== Composition and lyrics ==
"Agua" is a reggaeton track that samples the SpongeBob SquarePants theme song throughout the track, though Stephen Hillenburg was credited as a co-writer of "Agua". Regarding this track, J Balvin expressed that the track "has good vibes and a lot of happiness, which we need during these moments." Throughout the song, Balvin makes numerous references to SpongeBob characters and settings in the lyrics, and he interpolates part of the SpongeBob theme song in the track's bridge.

== Music video ==
The music video for "Agua" premiered on J Balvin's YouTube channel on July 15, 2020. The video reached 35.9 million views in its first tracking week and has amassed over 530 million views as of January 2021.

== Charts ==
=== Weekly charts ===
Weekly chart performance for "Agua"
Chart (2020)	Peak position
Argentina Hot 100 (Billboard)	3
Global 200 (Billboard)	46
Italy (FIMI)	89
Netherlands (Dutch Tipparade 40)	11
Netherlands (Single Top 100)	98
Portugal (AFP)	119
Spain (PROMUSICAE)	1
Suriname (Nationale Top 40)	5
Switzerland (Schweizer Hitparade)	80
US Bubbling Under Hot 100 (Billboard)	2
US Hot Latin Songs (Billboard)	5
US Latin Airplay (Billboard)	1
US Latin Pop Airplay (Billboard)	1
US Latin Rhythm Airplay (Billboard)	1

=== Year-end charts ===
2020 year-end chart performance for "Agua"
Chart (2020)	Position
Bolivia Airplay (Monitor Latino)	26
Chile Airplay (Monitor Latino)	87
Colombia Airplay (Monitor Latino)	80
Colombia Streaming (Monitor Latino)	46
Costa Rica Airplay (Monitor Latino)	48
Costa Rica Streaming (Monitor Latino)	22
Dominican Republic Streaming (Monitor Latino)	84
Ecuador Airplay (Monitor Latino)	36
Ecuador Streaming (Monitor Latino)	38
El Salvador Airplay (Monitor Latino)	19
El Salvador Streaming (Monitor Latino)	22
Guatemala Airplay (Monitor Latino)	48
Guatemala Streaming (Monitor Latino)	33
Honduras Airplay (Monitor Latino)	34
Latin America Airplay (Monitor Latino)	52
Latin America Streaming (Monitor Latino)	35
Nicaragua Airplay (Monitor Latino)	28
Paraguay Airplay (Monitor Latino)	37
Peru Airplay (Monitor Latino)	21
Peru Streaming (Monitor Latino)	32
Puerto Rico Airplay (Monitor Latino)	49
Puerto Rico Streaming (Monitor Latino)	37
Spain (PROMUSICAE)	54
US Hot Latin Songs (Billboard)	35
US Latin Streaming (Monitor Latino)	48

== Certifications ==
Certifications and sales for "Agua"
Region	Certification	Certified units/sales
Italy (FIMI)	Gold	35,000^{‡}
Spain (Promusicae)	2× Platinum	80,000^{‡}
United States (RIAA)	Gold	500,000^{‡}
^{‡} Sales+streaming figures based on certification alone.

== See also ==
- List of Billboard number-one Latin songs of 2020
