= List of number-one Billboard Latin Albums from the 2020s =

The Billboard Top Latin Albums chart, published by Billboard magazine, is a record chart that ranks the performance of Latin music albums in the United States. The data is compiled by Nielsen SoundScan from a sample that includes music stores, music departments at electronics and department stores, Internet sales (both physical and digital) and verifiable sales from concert venues in the United States. The multi-metric methodology to compile the Top Latin Albums chart also includes track equivalent album units and streaming equivalent album units.

The first number-one album of the decade was X 100pre by Puerto Rican rapper Bad Bunny.

== Number one albums ==
Artist	Album	Reached number one	Weeks at number one
Bad Bunny	X 100pre	4 January 2020	5
Myke Towers	Easy Money Baby	8 February 2020	1
Bad Bunny	X 100pre	15 February 2020	1
Prince Royce	Alter Ego	22 February 2020	1
Alejandro Fernández	Hecho en México	29 February 2020	1
Bad Bunny	X 100pre	7 March 2020	1
Bad Bunny	YHLQMDLG	14 March 2020	10
Bad Bunny	Las que no iban a salir	23 May 2020	1
Bad Bunny	YHLQMDLG	30 May 2020	2
Anuel AA	Emmanuel	13 June 2020	1
Bad Bunny	YHLQMDLG	20 June 2020	6
Eslabón Armado	Vibras de Noche	1 August 2020	1
Bad Bunny	YHLQMDLG	8 August 2020	6
Ozuna	ENOC	19 September 2020	1
Bad Bunny	YHLQMDLG	26 September 2020	11
Bad Bunny	El Último Tour Del Mundo	12 December 2020	3
Artist	Album	Reached number one	Weeks at number one
Bad Bunny	El Último Tour Del Mundo	2 January 2021	5
Anuel AA and Ozuna	Los Dioses	6 February 2021	1
Bad Bunny	El Último Tour Del Mundo	13 February 2021	6
Selena Gomez	Revelación	27 March 2021	1
Bad Bunny	El Último Tour Del Mundo	3 April 2021	1
Karol G	KG0516	10 April 2021	1
Bad Bunny	El Último Tour Del Mundo	17 April 2021	12
Rauw Alejandro	Vice Versa	10 July 2021	2
Bad Bunny	YHLQMDLG	24 July 2021	9
J Balvin	Jose	25 September 2021	3
Farruko	La 167	16 October 2021	1
Bad Bunny	YHLQMDLG	23 October 2021	7
Anuel AA	Las Leyendas Nunca Mueren	11 December 2021	2
Bad Bunny	YHLQMDLG	25 December 2021	1
Artist	Album	Reached number one	Weeks at number one
Bad Bunny	YHLQMDLG	1 January 2022	2
Bad Bunny	Anniversary Trilogy	15 January 2022	1
Bad Bunny	YHLQMDLG	22 January 2022	11
Daddy Yankee	Legendaddy	9 April 2022	1
Bad Bunny	YHLQMDLG	16 April 2022	5
Bad Bunny	Un Verano Sin Ti	21 May 2022	33
Artist	Album	Reached number one	Weeks at number one
Bad Bunny	Un Verano Sin Ti	7 January 2023	9
Karol G	Mañana Será Bonito	11 March 2023	5
Bad Bunny	Un Verano Sin Ti	15 April 2023	4
Eslabón Armado	Desvelado	13 May 2023	1
Bad Bunny	Un Verano Sin Ti	20 May 2023	7
Peso Pluma	Génesis	8 July 2023	7
Karol G	Mañana Será Bonito (Bichota Season)	26 August 2023	1
Peso Pluma	Génesis	2 September 2023	8
Bad Bunny	Nadie Sabe Lo Que Va a Pasar Mañana	28 October 2023	8
Peso Pluma	Génesis	23 December 2023	2
Artist	Album	Reached number one	Weeks at number one
Peso Pluma	Génesis	6 January 2024	1
Bad Bunny	Nadie Sabe Lo Que Va a Pasar Mañana	13 January 2024	1
Peso Pluma	Génesis	20 January 2024	1
Kali Uchis	Orquídeas	27 January 2024	2
Peso Pluma	Génesis	10 February 2024	4
Bad Bunny	Nadie Sabe Lo Que Va a Pasar Mañana	9 March 2024	1
Peso Pluma	Génesis	16 March 2024	3
Shakira	Las Mujeres Ya No Lloran	6 April 2024	1
Peso Pluma	Génesis	13 April 2024	2
Fuerza Regida	Pa Las Baby's y Belikeada	27 April 2024	3
Bad Bunny	Un Verano Sin Ti	18 May 2024	7
Peso Pluma	Éxodo	6 July 2024	4
Iván Cornejo	Mirada	3 August 2024	1
Peso Pluma	Éxodo	10 August 2024	8
Tito Double P	Incómodo	5 October 2024	8
Rauw Alejandro	Cosa Nuestra	30 November 2024	5
Artist	Album	Reached number one	Weeks at number one
Rauw Alejandro	Cosa Nuestra	4 January 2025	1
Tito Double P	Incómodo	11 January 2025	1
Bad Bunny	Debí Tirar Más Fotos	18 January 2025	18
Fuerza Regida	111xpantia	24 May 2025	1
Bad Bunny	Debí Tirar Más Fotos	31 May 2025	5
Karol G	Tropicoqueta	5 July 2025	2
Bad Bunny	Debí Tirar Más Fotos	19 July 2025	18
Rosalía	Lux	22 November 2025	1
Bad Bunny	Debí Tirar Más Fotos	29 November 2025	5
Artist	Album	Reached number one	Weeks at number one
Bad Bunny	Debí Tirar Más Fotos	3 January 2026	1
Peso Pluma and Tito Double P	Dinastía	10 January 2026	2
Bad Bunny	Debí Tirar Más Fotos	24 January 2026	30
Karol G	No Me Arrepiento de Sentir Tanto	22 August 2026	11
Bad Bunny	Debí Tirar Más Fotos	7 November 2026	3
