= La Difícil =

2020 song by Bad Bunny

Single by Bad Bunny

from the album YHLQMDLG
- Language: Spanish
- English title: "Hard to Get"
- Released: February 29, 2020
- Genre: Reggaeton
- Length: 2:43
- Label: Rimas
- Songwriter: Benito A. Martinez Ocasio
- Producers: Lenex; Mora; Subelo NEO; La Paciencia

Bad Bunny singles chronology
| "Ignorantes" (2020) | "La Difícil" (2020) | "Si Veo a Tu Mamá" (2020) |

Music video
- "La Difícil" on YouTube

"La Difícil" (English: "Hard to Get") is a song by Puerto Rican rapper Bad Bunny. It was released on February 29, 2020 as the third single of his second solo studio album of YHLQMDLG.

== Composition ==
In the song, the singer addresses one of his romantic interests that he is unable to win over as she is "playing hard to get". She was further described as a "woman with zero interest in being tied down after a bad breakup". However, according to Matthew Ismael Ruiz of Pitchfork, this is just the story "on its surface". The underlying message is amplified by its "empathetic" video, in that it gives an otherwise "one-dimensional scenery" more layers, which in this case depicts "a single mom who's doing her best for her daughter".

== Music video ==
Released on February 29, 2020, the music video was directed by Cliqua and Stillz. The visuals were referred to as "retro" and reminiscent of the 1990s and 2000s. Craig Jenkins of Vulture thought that the video "revisits the garish lighting, staging, styling, and dance sequences of early aughts music videos, with Bunny channeling *NSYNC-era Justin Timberlake in frosted tips, baby-blue threads, and gratuitous headbands and goggles". Isabella Gomez Sarmiento at NPR Music said that the music video underscores "the old-school feel of the album".

== Charts ==
=== Weekly charts ===
| Chart (2020) | Peak position |
|---|---|
| Argentina Hot 100 (Billboard) | 48 |
| Italy (FIMI) | 79 |
| Mexico Streaming (AMPROFON) | 3 |
| New Zealand Hot Singles (RMNZ) | 33 |
| Spain (PROMUSICAE) | 2 |
| Switzerland (Schweizer Hitparade) | 69 |
| Paraguay (Monitor Latino) | 15 |
| Puerto Rico (Monitor Latino) | 3 |
| US Billboard Hot 100 | 33 |
| US Hot Latin Songs (Billboard) | 2 |
| US Latin Airplay (Billboard) | 1 |
| US Latin Rhythm Airplay (Billboard) | 1 |
| US Rolling Stone Top 100 | 12 |

=== Year-end charts ===
| Chart (2020) | Position |
|---|---|
| Spain (PROMUSICAE) | 41 |
| US Hot Latin Songs (Billboard) | 6 |

== Certifications ==
| Region | Certification | Certified units/sales |
|---|---|---|
| Spain (Promusicae) | 3× Platinum | 180,000^{‡} |
| United States (RIAA) | 15× Platinum (Latin) | 900,000^{‡} |
^{‡} Sales+streaming figures based on certification alone.

== See also ==
- List of Billboard number-one Latin songs of 2020
