= Sandungueo =

Style of reggaeton dance and party music from Puerto Rico

Sandungueo, also known as perreo, is a style of dance and party music associated with reggaeton that emerged in the late 1980s in Puerto Rico. The style was developed by DJ Blass, who released the albums Sandunguero Vol. 1 and Vol. 2, and it was further popularized worldwide through the website Sandungueo.com.

Sandungueo is characterized by hip movements and can be performed in various ways. It may be danced solo or with a partner, with men and women often adopting different approaches. Perreo, like many dances, can be enjoyed individually by emphasizing hip movements, or it can be performed with a partner.

The concept of dancing perreo alone was highlighted in Bad Bunny's song "Yo Perreo Sola," which encourages women to dance solo if they choose. This idea builds upon the work of Ivy Queen, who empowered women within reggaeton culture by including messages in her songs that emphasized female agency and the importance of respect in perreo.

== Origins ==
Sandungueo, or perreo, is a dance that involves front-to-back pelvic thrusts and swiveling movements of the hips and pelvis, mirroring movements associated with sexual intercourse, specifically anal sex or "doggy style." The general attitude of the dance is one of seduction, with most of the movements involving the female dancer grinding her backside against the male dancer's crotch. Alongside its sexual connotations, the dance also includes natural improvisations and role reversals.

Drawing on research conducted in Cuba by ethnomusicologist Vincenzo Perna (see his book Timba: The Sound of the Cuban Crisis, Ashgate, 2005), author Jan Fairley suggested that this style of dance, along with other timba moves such as despelote, tembleque, and subasta de la cintura—in which the woman is both in control and the main focus of the dance—can be traced to Cuba's economic conditions in the 1990s and to choreographic forms of popular music dancing of that period, particularly Afro-Cuban timba. As the U.S. dollar (which functioned as a dual currency alongside the Cuban peso until 2001) became more valuable, women adapted their dance styles to appear more visually appealing to men, particularly to yumas (foreigners) who had dollars. This tension between the use of the female body as both an objectified commodity and an active, self-expressive tool is one of the paradoxes that dembow dancing creates in Cuba.

Additionally, Cubans attribute this woman-led style of dancing to the broader Caribbean region, where waistline movements known as whining are similar to sandungueo. Sandungueo has both influenced and been influenced by other hip-oriented, sexually suggestive dance styles, including American twerking, grinding, and bootydancing. It also borrows gestures from other Latin American dance forms such as salsa and merengue.

== Dance movements ==
Typical gestures of sandungueo consist of pelvic thrusting that mimics anal sex, with the female dancer typically bent over, swiveling her hips against the male dancer's crotch. These movements resemble other dance styles such as twerking and grinding, but there are unwritten stylistic rules that make sandungueo distinct. For example, the female dancer's hips usually sway more vigorously toward the male's, and her knees are flexed downward and upward, similar to movements found in salsa and merengue.

The sexual dynamic of the movements creates roles for each dancer: the male as the "penetrator" and the female as the "penetrated." However, the concept of dominance traditionally assigned to the male in social dance is subverted in sandungueo. The female dancer is considered to be in control of the partnered dance while still maintaining the "penetrated" role. Often, she uses this control to lead the male and dictate the movements according to her preference. Additionally, the female dancer is known to terminate the dance by walking away if she disapproves of the male's behavior, suggesting that her control and agency within the dance are to be respected.

== Controversy ==
Sandungueo.com and the underground/reggaeton music genre became the subject of national controversy in Puerto Rico as reggaeton music and the predominantly lower-class culture from which it emerged gained popularity and wider accessibility. Velda González, a well-known senator and public figure in Puerto Rico and the Dominican Republic, led a campaign against reggaeton, specifically targeting Sandungueo.com and the perreo style of dancing. She described the dance as overtly erotic, sexually explicit, and degrading to women.

Sandungueo has also faced significant criticism in Cuba. Part of this criticism stems from its association with reggaeton, which, despite its popularity in Cuba, has been heavily criticized for being degrading to women. Perreo has been viewed as a departure from traditional front-to-front partner dances (such as salsa) to back-to-front dancing. Some Cuban dancers argue that this shift places women in control, while others claim it is "un-Cuban". The Cuban government appeared to share this sentiment, banning reggaeton (sometimes referred to as "Cubaton") in 2012.

A remix titled "Perreo intenso" became one of the popular songs during the Telegramgate protests that led to Puerto Rican Governor Ricardo Rosselló's resignation.

An analysis of Puerto Rican discourse during this period shows politicians and reggaeton artists denouncing each other's corruption and immoral behavior, respectively. While SWAT teams were on standby, a perreo intenso (transl. an intense perreo) took place in front of the governor's mansion at the time of his resignation announcement.

== Doble Paso ==
Doble Paso is a form of sandungueo or perreo characterized by a faster rhythm and tempo, resulting in a dance style that is more sexually explicit and intense. Doble Paso has been emerging and gaining popularity primarily among Puerto Rican teenagers, leading to criticism from parents and conservative sectors of the community.

== See also ==
- Reggaeton
- Twerking
- Daggering
- "Yo Perreo Sola"
