= Hawái (song) =

2020 single by Maluma featuring the Weeknd

Single by Maluma

from the album Papi Juancho
- Language: Spanish
- Released: July 29, 2020
- Genre: Reggaeton
- Length: 3:20
- Label: Sony Music Latin
- Songwriters: Juan Luis Londoño; Edgar Barrera; René Cano; Kevin Cruz; Kevin Jiménez; Johan Espinosa; Stiven Rojas; Bryan Lezcano; Andrés Uribe; Juan Vargas
- Producers: Ily Wonder; Jowan; Keityn; Kevin ADG; Chan El Genio

Maluma singles chronology
"Feel the Beat" (2020)	"Hawái" (2020)	"Pa' Ti + Lonely" (2020)

Music video
- "Hawái" on YouTube

"Hawái" (English: "Hawaii") is a song recorded by the Colombian singer Maluma, released on July 29, 2020, through Sony Music Latin as the second single from Maluma's fifth studio album, Papi Juancho (2020). A reggaeton song with pop ballad elements, it was written by Maluma, Edgar Barrera, René Cano, Kevin Cruz, Kevin Jiménez, Johan Espinosa, Stiven Rojas, Bryan Lezcano, Andrés Uribe and Juan Vargas, and co-produced by Ily Wonder, Jowan, Keityn, and Kevin ADG and Chan El Genio (The Rude Boyz). A remix with Canadian singer the Weeknd was released on November 5, 2020, accompanying a music video.

"Hawái" topped the Billboard Hot Latin Songs chart for nine weeks consecutively, giving Maluma his first number one hit on the chart. The song has also topped the record charts in Argentina, Chile, Colombia, Mexico, Panama, and Spain. After the release of the remix that improved its charting performance, the song peaked at number 12 on the US Billboard Hot 100, and at number three on the Global 200 chart. "Hawái" also became the first number-one single on the Billboard Global Excl. U.S. chart.

== Background and composition ==
"Hawái" is a reggaeton song with pop ballad elements about the protagonist dealing with his ex lover publicly preaching her newfound happiness after their break-up, not convinced by her social media persona.

In August 2020, Paris Saint-Germain F.C. player Ángel Di Maria posted an Instagram story singing "Hawái" alongside other teammates, including Neymar, who the press noticed became close friends with Maluma's ex-girlfriend. Shortly after, Maluma closed his Instagram account, with the reaction receiving media coverage. The singer later explained that the latter was unrelated to the video and that he was appreciative of them playing the song, denying having any problem with Neymar. Maluma also denied that the song was inspired by his personal life, despite several similarities.

== Music video ==
The music video for "Hawái" was released on the same day as the single. Filmed in Miami, the video was directed by Jessy Terrero and stars Maluma and model Yovanna Ventura. In the video, Maluma argues with his girlfriend (portrayed by Ventura) and consequently breaks up with her. Maluma proceeds to crash his ex's wedding ceremony in order to win her back. The music video has generated over 1 billion views on YouTube as of June 2023.

== Live performances ==
On August 30, 2020, Maluma performed "Hawái" at the 2020 MTV Video Music Awards. He performed in a drive-in concert on a stage near the East River. He also performed the song at the 2020 Billboard Latin Music Awards and at the 2020 MTV Europe Music Awards in a medley with "Djadja (Remix)".

== The Weeknd remix ==
"Hawái" (remix)

Single by Maluma and the Weeknd
- Language: Spanish; English
- Released: November 5, 2020
- Length: 3:20
- Label: Sony Music Latin
- Songwriters: Juan Luis Londoño; Edgar Barrera; René Cano; Kevin Cruz; Kevin Jiménez; Johan Espinosa; Stiven Rojas; Bryan Lezcano; Andrés Uribe; Juan Vargas; Abel Tesfaye
- Producers: Ily Wonder; Jowan; Keityn; Kevin ADG; Chan El Genio

Maluma singles chronology
"Pa' Ti + Lonely" (2020)	"Hawái" (remix) (2020)	"Madrid" (2020)

The Weeknd singles chronology
"Over Now" (2020)	"Hawái" (remix) (2020)	"Save Your Tears" (remix) (2021)

Music video
- "Hawái" (remix) on YouTube

=== Background and release ===
A day after posting a picture together on their respective Instagram pages teasing a collaboration, Maluma and the Weeknd released a remixed version of "Hawái" on November 5, 2020. The Weeknd opens the song with a verse in English and sings the hook in Spanish. A music video directed by Jessy Terrero accompanied the release as well, wherein both artists perform the song in a "neon-lit club".

In Billboard, Leila Cobo noticed "[it] wasn't a last-minute, let's-slap-this-together remix, but a let-me-write-a-new-verse-and-work-on-my-Spanish collaboration." In an interview with the magazine, Maluma's music partner Miguel Lua stated that, "Originally, Maluma didn't want to do a remix... he doesn't have any bilingual remixes, and in this particular case, he wasn't looking for one... [however] he had a short list of artists he wanted to work on in general." The Weeknd's manager Sal Slaiby contacted Lua in early October saying that the singer was considering "doing something for the Latin market" and asking for Maluma's unreleased tracks to listen, with the other part proposing them the idea of the remix. They shot the video in Los Angeles and delivered it to Sony Music Latin the night before the release.

=== Critical reception ===
Justin Curto of Vulture commented that the Weeknd "brings his R&B longing" to the first verse of the track, which "seems like an extension of his After Hours universe", until he "begins singing in Spanish and loosening up onstage" in the video. He also opined that "the Spanish is fine, but the dancing is unexpectedly dorky, especially compared to the Papi Juancho himself, still oozing sex appeal here" and concluded that his dance routine "just might be the thing that makes you smile today." News agency EFE opined that "the song flows while both artists keep their musical identities intact." Andrew Tendrell of NME called it a "slick party gem" and Jessica Roiz of Billboard deemed it a "fiery" remix.

== Commercial performance ==
On the US Billboard Hot 100, the original version peaked at number 55, becoming Maluma's 6th chart entry. After the release of the remix version with the Weeknd, the song peaked at number 12 on November 1, 2020, becoming his first top 15 and highest-charting single in the US, surpassing his collaboration "Arms Around You". The song would become the first #1 of the Billboard Global Excluding US chart (which compiles streaming and sales data for all territories except the United States) when it was launched for the week dated September 19, 2020.

== Charts ==
=== Weekly charts ===
Chart performance for "Hawái"
Chart (2020–2021)	Peak position
Argentina Hot 100 (Billboard)	1
Australia (ARIA)	88
Belgium (Ultratip Bubbling Under Flanders)	33
Brazil (Pop Internacional)	4
Brazil (Top 100 Airplay)	43
Colombia (National-Report)	1
France (SNEP)	86
Global 200 (Billboard)	3
Hungary (Single Top 40)	30
Italy (FIMI)	60
Mexico Airplay (Billboard)	1
Panama (Monitor Latino)	1
Paraguay (SGP)	7
Portugal (AFP)	2
Romania (Airplay 100)	8
Singapore (RIAS)	25
Slovakia Singles Digital (ČNS IFPI)	64
Spain (Promusicae)	1
Sweden Heatseeker (Sverigetopplistan)	14
Switzerland (Schweizer Hitparade)	8
UK Singles (Official Charts)	84
US Billboard Hot 100	55
US Hot Latin Songs (Billboard)	1
US Latin Airplay (Billboard)	1
US Rolling Stone Top 100	49

Chart performance for "Hawái" with the Weeknd
Chart (2020–2021)	Peak position
Austria (Ö3 Austria Top 40)	58
Belgium (Ultratip Bubbling Under Flanders)	11
Belgium (Ultratop 50 Wallonia)	27
Bolivia (Monitor Latino)	1
Canada Hot 100 (Billboard)	21
Canada CHR/Top 40 (Billboard)	37
Canada Hot AC (Billboard)	50
Chile (Monitor Latino)	1
Costa Rica (Monitor Latino)	1
Dominican Republic (Monitor Latino)	1
Germany (GfK)	62
Guatemala (Monitor Latino)	1
Italy (FIMI)	41
Lithuania (AGATA)	33
Netherlands (Dutch Top 40)	13
Netherlands (Single Top 100)	17
New Zealand Hot Singles (RMNZ)	8
Panama (Monitor Latino)	1
Peru (Monitor Latino)	1
Portugal (AFP)	30
Spain (PROMUSICAE)	39
Sweden (Sverigetopplistan)	28
Uruguay (Monitor Latino)	1
US Billboard Hot 100	12
US Pop Airplay (Billboard)	34
US Rhythmic Airplay (Billboard)	18
US Rolling Stone Top 100	5
Venezuela (Monitor Latino)	1

=== Year-end charts ===
Chart (2020)	Position
Argentina Airplay (Monitor Latino)	16
El Salvador (ASAP EGC)	2
Peru (Monitor Latino)	18
Spain (PROMUSICAE)	4
Switzerland (Schweizer Hitparade)	77
US Hot Latin Songs (Billboard)	14
Venezuela (Monitor Latino)	8

Chart (2021)	Position
Global 200 (Billboard)	24
Netherlands (Dutch Top 40)	68
Portugal (AFP)	59
Spain (PROMUSICAE)	31
US Hot Latin Songs (Billboard)	3

=== All-time charts ===
Chart (2021)	Position
US Hot Latin Songs (Billboard)	31

== Certifications ==
=== Original version ===
Region	Certification	Certified units/sales
Brazil (Pro-Música Brasil)	Diamond	160,000^{‡}
Canada (Music Canada)	Platinum	80,000^{‡}
France (SNEP)	Platinum	200,000^{‡}
Mexico (AMPROFON)	4× Diamond+2× Platinum	1,320,000^{‡}
New Zealand (RMNZ)	Gold	15,000^{‡}
Poland (ZPAV)	Gold	10,000^{‡}
Portugal (AFP)	3× Platinum	30,000^{‡}
Spain (Promusicae)	7× Platinum	420,000^{‡}
Switzerland (IFPI Switzerland)	Gold	10,000^{‡}
United Kingdom (BPI)	Silver	200,000^{‡}
United States (RIAA)	4× Diamond (Latin)	2,400,000^{‡}
^{‡} Sales+streaming figures based on certification alone.

=== The Weeknd remix ===
Region	Certification	Certified units/sales
Brazil (Pro-Música Brasil)	2× Platinum	80,000^{‡}
Italy (FIMI)	Platinum	70,000^{‡}
Mexico (AMPROFON)	Platinum	140,000^{‡}
Portugal (AFP)	Gold	5,000^{‡}
Spain (Promusicae)	Gold	30,000^{‡}
United States (RIAA)	22× Platinum (Latin)	1,320,000^{‡}
^{‡} Sales+streaming figures based on certification alone.

== See also ==
- List of Billboard Hot Latin Songs and Latin Airplay number ones of 2020
