= Vete =

2019 song by Bad Bunny

Single by Bad Bunny

from the album YHLQMDLG
- Language: Spanish
- English title: "Leave"
- Released: November 21, 2019
- Genre: Reggaeton
- Length: 3:12
- Label: Rimas
- Songwriters: Benito Martínez; Ivaniel Ortiz; Jose Cruz; Freddy Montalvo; Cesar Batista-Escalera; Edgar Semper-Vergas; Xavier Semper-Vergas
- Producers: Subelo NEO; Hazen

Bad Bunny singles chronology
"Cántalo" (2019)	"Vete" (2019)	"Ignorantes" (2020)

Music video
- "Vete" on YouTube

"Vete" (transl. "Leave") is a song by Puerto Rican rapper Bad Bunny. It was released on November 21, 2019, through Rimas Entertainment, as the lead single from his second solo studio album YHLQMDLG (2020).

== Critical reception ==
Ecleen Luzmila Caraballo of Remezcla pointed out that the song does not stand out amongst his previous releases but "it lives on an emo wavelength I (and I suspect many of you) generally appreciate, and have come to expect from this urbano loverboy". Alejandra Cortés at Nación Rex praised the song for having a sticky rhythm that makes one want to dance.

== Music video ==
The video was released on November 21, 2019, and was directed by Cliqua x Stillz. It features the singer stepping into a light that previously illuminated him and performing next to a LaFerrari in front of a fire afterwards. He is later seen showing off the car at a party. The Fader's Jordan Darville described the visuals as "sad yet flashy, juxtaposing images of a spurned young child with Bad Bunny flexing from another dimension as only he can".

== Charts ==
=== Weekly charts ===
Chart (2019)	Peak position
Argentina Hot 100 (Billboard)	30
Bolivia (Monitor Latino)	11
Paraguay (SGP)	25
Puerto Rico (Monitor Latino)	4
Spain (PROMUSICAE)	2
Switzerland (Schweizer Hitparade)	63
US Billboard Hot 100	33
US Hot Latin Songs (Billboard)	1
US Latin Airplay (Billboard)	1
US Latin Rhythm Airplay (Billboard)	1
US Rolling Stone Top 100	6
Venezuela (Monitor Latino)	18

=== Year-end charts ===
Chart (2019–2020)	Position
Spain (PROMUSICAE)	62
US Hot Latin Songs (Billboard)	3

== Certifications ==
Region	Certification	Certified units/sales
Italy (FIMI)	Gold	50,000^{‡}
Spain (Promusicae)	3× Platinum	180,000^{‡}
United States (RIAA)	27× Platinum (Latin)	1,620,000^{‡}
^{‡} Sales+streaming figures based on certification alone.

== See also ==
- List of Billboard Hot Latin Songs and Latin Airplay number ones of 2019
- List of Billboard Hot Latin Songs and Latin Airplay number ones of 2020
