= Yo Perreo Sola =

2020 single by Bad Bunny

- Spotify promotional cover

Single by Bad Bunny

from the album YHLQMDLG
- Language: Spanish
- English title: "I Twerk Alone"
- Released: March 27, 2020
- Genre: Reggaeton; dembow
- Length: 2:52
- Label: Rimas
- Songwriters: Benito Martínez; Cruz; Montalvo; Marco Masis; Genesis Rios-Serrano
- Producers: Bad Bunny; Tainy; Subelo NEO

Bad Bunny singles chronology
"Bichiyal" (2020)	"Yo Perreo Sola" (2020)	"Hasta Que Dios Diga" (2020)

Remix cover

Music video
- "Yo Perreo Sola" on YouTube

"Yo Perreo Sola" (English: "I Twerk Alone") is a song by Puerto Rican rapper Bad Bunny from his second studio album YHLQMDLG (2020), featuring uncredited vocals by Nesi. The song's music video features Bad Bunny performing in drag. It won a Latin Grammy Award for Best Reggaeton Performance. A remix featuring Nesi and Ivy Queen was released on October 14, 2020, following their performance of the song at the 2020 Billboard Music Awards.

== Production ==
Musically, "Yo Perreo Sola" comprises 808 drums and "stripped-down" reggaeton beats. It features uncredited vocals from artist Nesi (Genesis Rios). According to Rolling Stone, the song "is dedicated to those who desire to dance alone, and safely, at the club." Bad Bunny told the magazine in an interview:

I wrote it from the perspective of a woman. I wanted a woman's voice to sing it—'yo perreo sola'—because it doesn’t mean the same thing when a man sings it. But I do feel like that woman sometimes.

== Critical reception ==
Writing for Jezebel, Shannon Malero called the original "song of the summer", adding that the remix "elevates this song from good to pendeja power anthem of the winter." Liz Calvario for Entertainment Weekly, labeled the performance at the Billboard Music Awards as "epic" and "slamming". For E!, Billy Nilles called the remix "excellent", adding that the "extra feminine energy on the track made it more powerful". Billboard magazine named Ivy Queen joining the remix as one of five uplifting moments in Latin music for the week of October 17, 2020. Billboard also named it Latin remix of the week. Before the remixed version, album reviews by Pitchfork and NPR criticized that Nesi was not credited as a performer on the track listing, despite the song's message of empowerment.

Time named "Yo Perreo Sola" remix the third best song of the year. Complex ranked the original version the seventh-best of the year, calling it "one of 2020's defining musical moments," and Billboard ranked it 18th. Pitchfork included it among the 100 best songs of the year and on "the 22 best songs by Latinx artists in 2020." In 2022, Rolling Stone listed the remix at number 14 on its list of the 100 Greatest Reggaeton Songs of All Time.

== Music video ==
Bad Bunny perreando with himself in drag.

Directed by Bad Bunny and Stillz, the music video for "Yo Perreo Sola" premiered on March 27, 2020. Bad Bunny opens the clip in a red vinyl miniskirt and thigh-high boots, as he pushes away a group of men who approaches him. He also appears perreando in a green room, with the message "Ni una menos" displayed in the background. The video closes with "Si no quiere bailar contigo, respeta, ella perrea sola" ("If she doesn’t want to dance with you, respect her, she twerks alone.")

Stillz stated in Billboard that the performer "wanted to symbolize that men also care about women’s rights and that violence against women also affects us as men... he wanted to impact and take a message to the reggaeton community that usually is not as open to speak about the LGBTQ community." Stillz and stylist Chloe Delgadillo further explained the looks displayed in the video, with the red outfit representing a sexy "badass" girl in latex suit, the second look, a perfect "Instagram girl" who "is ready to dance alone at the club", and the third, a "classy girl", dressed in a black outfit with a shiny hat.

Writing for Billboard, Suzette Fernandez opined, "it's as visually eye-opening as it is conscientious, talking about respect for women and highlighting the LGBT community, a departure for Latin urban music." In Rolling Stone, Suzy Exposito described the video as "jaw dropping", and considered the message in the closing scene "[a] damning-but-necessary public service announcement on sexual harassment." As of September 2021, the music video has received more than 500 million views on YouTube.

Vulture and Billboard ranked it as the best and fifth-best music video of 2020, respectively.

== Live performances ==
Bad Bunny performed the song as part of his Super Bowl halftime show.

== Charts ==
=== Weekly charts ===
Weekly chart performance for "Yo Perreo Sola"
Chart (2020)	Peak position
Argentina Hot 100 (Billboard)	2
Chile (Monitor Latino)	1
Costa Rica (Monitor Latino)	10
Colombia (Monitor Latino)	5
Dominican Republic (SODINPRO)	7
Ecuador (Monitor Latino)	4
El Salvador (Monitor Latino)	7
Global 200 (Billboard)	79
Guatemala (Monitor Latino)	13
Honduras (Monitor Latino)	5
Mexico Streaming (AMPROFON)	6
Nicaragua (Monitor Latino)	1
Spain (PROMUSICAE)	4
Suriname (Nationale Top 40)	3
Paraguay (SGP)	6
Peru (Monitor Latino)	4
Puerto Rico (Monitor Latino)	12
US Billboard Hot 100	53
US Hot Latin Songs (Billboard)	2
US Latin Rhythm Airplay (Billboard)	1
US Latin Airplay (Billboard)	1
Venezuela (Monitor Latino)	16

Chart (2026)	Peak position
Global 200 (Billboard)	74
Greece International (IFPI)	17
Portugal (AFP)	57
US Hot Latin Rhythm Songs (Billboard)	9

=== Year-end charts ===
2020 year-end chart performance for "Yo Perreo Sola"
Chart (2020)	Position
Argentina Airplay (Monitor Latino)	37
Bolivia Airplay (Monitor Latino)	89
Chile Airplay (Monitor Latino)	12
Colombia Airplay (Monitor Latino)	27
Colombia Streaming (Monitor Latino)	9
Costa Rica Airplay (Monitor Latino)	49
Costa Rica Streaming (Monitor Latino)	54
Dominican Republic Airplay (Monitor Latino)	67
Dominican Republic Streaming (Monitor Latino)	40
Ecuador Airplay (Monitor Latino)	16
Ecuador Streaming (Monitor Latino)	17
El Salvador Airplay (Monitor Latino)	22
El Salvador Streaming (Monitor Latino)	33
Guatemala Airplay (Monitor Latino)	41
Guatemala Streaming (Monitor Latino)	21
Honduras Airplay (Monitor Latino)	18
Nicaragua Airplay (Monitor Latino)	4
Paraguay Airplay (Monitor Latino)	48
Peru Airplay (Monitor Latino)	21
Peru Streaming (Monitor Latino)	5
Puerto Rico Airplay (Monitor Latino)	68
Puerto Rico Streaming (Monitor Latino)	42
Spain (PROMUSICAE)	39
Uruguay Airplay (Monitor Latino)	84
US Hot Latin Songs (Billboard)	4
Venezuela Airplay (Monitor Latino)	43

== Certifications ==
Certifications for "Yo Perreo Sola"
Region	Certification	Certified units/sales
Italy (FIMI)	Gold	50,000^{‡}
Spain (Promusicae)	3× Platinum	180,000^{‡}
United States (RIAA)	24× Platinum (Latin)	1,440,000^{‡}
^{‡} Sales+streaming figures based on certification alone.

== See also ==
- List of Billboard number-one Latin songs of 2020
