= Anuel AA discography =

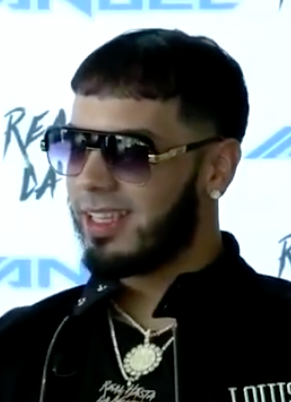
- Anuel AA in 2018
- Studio albums: 5
- Singles: 81
- Mixtapes: 1
- Promotional singles: 3

Puerto Rican rapper and singer Anuel AA has released five studio albums, one mixtape, eighty one singles (including seventeen as a featured artist), three promotional singles and seventy one other charted.

== Albums ==
=== Studio albums ===
List of studio albums, with selected details, chart positions and certifications
Title	Studio album details	Peak chart positions									Certifications
Title	Studio album details	US	US Latin	BEL (Wa)	CAN	FIN	FRA	ITA	SPA	SWI	Certifications
Real Hasta la Muerte	Released: July 17, 2018; Label: Real Hasta la Muerte; Format: CD, digital download, streaming	42	1	—	—	—	—	—	69	—	RIAA: 6× Platinum (Latin); FIMI: Gold; PROMUSICAE: Gold
Emmanuel	Released: May 29, 2020; Label: Real Hasta la Muerte, Sony Latin; Format: CD, digital download, streaming	8	1	194	64	29	141	14	1	15	RIAA: 6× Platinum (Latin); AMPROFON: Platinum; FIMI: Platinum; PROMUSICAE: Platinum
Los Dioses (with Ozuna)	Released: January 22, 2021; Label: Real Hasta la Muerte, Aura, Sony Latin; Format: CD, digital download, streaming	10	1	—	—	—	—	46	1	17	PROMUSICAE: Gold
Las Leyendas Nunca Mueren	Released: November 26, 2021; Label: Real Hasta la Muerte, Sony Latin; Format: CD, digital download, streaming	30	1	—	—	—	—	—	5	96	RIAA: 4× Platinum (Latin); PROMUSICAE: Gold
LLNM2	Released: December 9, 2022; Label: Real Hasta la Muerte, Sony Latin; Format: CD, digital download, streaming	30	2	—	—	—	—	—	8	—	RIAA: 3× Platinum (Latin); PROMUSICAE: Gold
Real Hasta La Muerte 2	Released: November 19, 2026; Label: Real Hasta la Muerte, Sony Latin; Format: CD, digital download, streaming	—	—	—	—	—	—	—	—	—	
Cartel Real Hasta La Muerte	Released: November 19, 2026; Label: Real Hasta la Muerte, Sony Latin; Format: CD, digital download, streaming	—	—	—	—	—	—	—	—	—	
"—" denotes a recording that did not chart or was not released in that territory.

== Singles ==
=== As lead artist ===
List of singles as lead artist, with selected chart positions, showing year released and album name
Title	Year	Peak chart positions										Certifications	Album
Title	Year	US	US Latin	ARG	COL	ITA	MEX	SPA	SWE	SWI	WW	Certifications	Album
"Ayer" (featuring DJ Nelson or remix featuring Farruko)	2015	—	42	—	—	—	—	—	—	—	—	RIAA: 2× Platinum (Latin)	Non-album singles
"Sola" (or remix featuring Daddy Yankee, Zion & Lennox, Farruko and Wisin)	2017	—	34	—	—	—	—	15	—	—	—	RIAA: 7× Platinum (Latin) (remix); FIMI: Gold; PROMUSICAE: 3× Platinum; PROMUSICAE: Platinum (remix)	Non-album singles
"La Última Vez" (with Bad Bunny)	2017	—	34	—	—	—	—	74	—	—	—		Non-album singles
"Ayer 2" (featuring DJ Nelson, J Balvin, Nicky Jam and Cosculluela)	2017	—	—	—	—	—	—	—	—	—	—	PROMUSICAE: Platinum	Non-album singles
"Culpables" (with Karol G)	2018	— (Note: "Culpables" did not enter the Billboard Hot 100, but peaked at number 17 on the Bubbling Under Hot 100 chart.)	8	14	32	—	— (Note: "Culpables" did not enter the Billboard Mexico Airplay chart, but peaked at number 46 on the Mexico Espanol Airplay chart.)	19	—	—	—	RIAA: Diamond (Latin); PROMUSICAE: 2× Platinum	Ocean
"Que Sería"	2018	—	—	—	—	—	—	73	—	—	—		Non-album singles
"Ella Quiere Beber" (with Romeo Santos)	2018	61	4	14	—	59	— (Note: "Ella Quiere Beber" did not enter the Billboard Mexico Airplay chart, but peaked at number 34 on the Mexico Espanol Airplay chart.)	7	—	—	—	RIAA: Platinum (Latin); FIMI: Platinum; PROMUSICAE: 4× Platinum	Non-album singles
"Adictiva" (with Daddy Yankee)	2018	— (Note: "Adictiva" did not enter the Billboard Hot 100, but peaked at number 20 on the Bubbling Under Hot 100 chart.)	10	5	34	—	— (Note: "Adictiva" did not enter the Billboard Mexico Airplay chart, but peaked at number 38 on the Mexico Espanol Airplay chart.)	4	—	—	—	PROMUSICAE: 3× Platinum	Non-album singles
"A Solas" (remix) (with Lunay, Lyanno, Brytiago and Alex Rose)	2018	—	—	—	—	—	—	39	—	—	—	RIAA: Platinum (Latin); PROMUSICAE: Platinum	Épico
"Amanece" (with Haze)	2018	—	11	17	—	—	— (Note: "Amanece" did not enter the Billboard Mexico Airplay chart, but peaked at number 46 on the Mexico Espanol Airplay chart.)	4	—	—	—	RIAA: 13× Platinum (Latin); FIMI: Platinum; PROMUSICAE: 6× Platinum	Non-album single
"Secreto" (with Karol G)	2019	68	4	3	5	34	— (Note: "Secreto" did not enter the Billboard Mexico Airplay chart, but peaked at number 36 on the Mexico Espanol Airplay chart.)	1	—	65	—	RIAA: Diamond (Latin); FIMI: Platinum; PROMUSICAE: 4× Platinum	Emmanuel
"Controla" (with Brytiago)	2019	—	28	60	—	—	—	41	—	—	—	PROMUSICAE: Gold	Non-album singles
"Ven y Hazlo Tú" (with Nicky Jam and J Balvin featuring Arcángel)	2019	—	39	72	—	—	—	56	—	—	—		Non-album singles
"Guayo" (with Zion & Lennox and Haze)	2019	—	50	—	—	—	— (Note: "Guayo" did not enter the Billboard Mexico Airplay chart, but peaked at number 28 on the Mexico Espanol Airplay chart.)	47	—	—	—	PROMUSICAE: Gold	Non-album singles
"Por Ley"	2019	—	49	—	—	—	—	64	—	—	—		Non-album singles
"Cambio" (with Ozuna)	2019	—	27	—	—	—	—	25	—	—	—	PROMUSICAE: Gold	Non-album singles
"LHNA" (with RobGz)	2019	—	—	—	—	—	—	—	—	—	—	RIAA: Platinum (Latin)	LHNA
"China" (with Daddy Yankee and Karol G featuring Ozuna and J Balvin)	2019	43	1	1	1	15	1	1	39	10	—	RIAA: Gold (Latin); AMPROFON: Diamond+Gold; FIMI: 2× Platinum; PROMUSICAE: 7× Platinum	Emmanuel
"Otro Trago" (remix) (with Sech and Ozuna featuring Darell and Nicky Jam)	2019	34	1	1	1	—	6	2	96	—	—	PROMUSICAE: 3× Platinum	Non-album singles
"Adicto" (with Tainy and Ozuna)	2019	86	5	5	10	—	—	3	—	87	—	RIAA: Platinum; FIMI: Gold; PROMUSICAE: 4× Platinum	Non-album singles
"Yes" (with Fat Joe and Cardi B)	2019	— (Note: "Yes" did not enter the Billboard Hot 100, but peaked at number 15 on the Bubbling Under Hot 100 chart.)	—	—	—	—	—	—	—	—	—	RIAA: Gold	Family Ties
"Te Quemaste" (with Manuel Turizo)	2019	—	31	44	5	—	— (Note: "Te Quemaste" did not enter the Billboard Mexico Airplay chart, but peaked at number 18 on the Mexico Espanol Airplay chart.)	4	—	—	—	AMPROFON: 2× Platinum; FIMI: Gold; PROMUSICAE: 3× Platinum	ADN
"Whine Up" (with Nicky Jam)	2019	—	17	18	3	—	— (Note: "Whine Up" did not enter the Billboard Mexico Airplay chart, but peaked at number 17 on the Mexico Espanol Airplay chart.)	3	—	66	—	AMPROFON: 3× Platinum; PROMUSICAE: 2× Platinum	Íntimo
"Aventura" (with Lunay and Ozuna)	2019	— (Note: "Aventura " did not enter the Billboard Hot 100, but peaked at number 20 on the Bubbling Under Hot 100 chart.)	11	16	—	—	—	5	—	—	—	PROMUSICAE: 2× Platinum	Épico
"Me Gusta" (with Shakira)	2020	— (Note: "Me Gusta" did not enter the Billboard Hot 100, but peaked at number 16 on the Bubbling Under Hot 100 chart.)	6	18	3	62	4	2	—	42	—	AMPROFON: 3× Diamond+Gold; FIMI: Gold; PROMUSICAE: 3× Platinum	Non-album singles
"Medusa" (with Jhayco and J Balvin)	2020	— (Note: "Medusa" did not enter the Billboard Hot 100, but peaked at number 19 on the Bubbling Under Hot 100 chart.)	12	57	48	—	—	5	—	—	—	RIAA: Diamond (Latin); PROMUSICAE: Platinum	Non-album singles
"Keii"	2020	83	3	33	—	—	21	2	—	—	—	PROMUSICAE: 2× Platinum	Non-album singles
"Fantasías" (remix) (with Rauw Alejandro, Farruko, Natti Natasha and Lunay)	2020	—	—	—	—	—	—	16	—	—	—	AMPROFON: Platinum+Gold; PROMUSICAE: Platinum	Non-album singles
"Follow" (with Karol G)	2020	—	17	68	43	—	—	9	—	—	—	PROMUSICAE: Platinum	Non-album singles
"3 de Abril"	2020	—	28	—	—	—	—	23	—	—	—	PROMUSICAE: Gold	Non-album singles
"Sola & Vacía" (with Casper Mágico)	2020	—	—	—	—	—	—	5	—	—	—	RIAA: 2× Platinum (Latin); PROMUSICAE: Platinum	Now or Never
"No Me Ame" (with Rvssian and Juice Wrld)	2020	—	15	—	—	—	—	24	—	—	—		Non-album singles
"Illuminati" (with Lil Pump)	2020	—	21	—	—	—	—	—	—	—	—		Non-album singles
"La bebe" (remix) (with Cardi B and Black Jonas Point featuring Secreto "El Famoso Biberón" and Liro Shaq)	2020	—	—	—	—	—	—	58	—	—	—	RIAA: Gold (Latin)	Non-album singles
"Sur y Norte" (with Ñengo Flow)	2020	—	—	—	—	—	—	5	—	—	—	PROMUSICAE: 2× Platinum	The Goat
"La Jeepeta" (remix) (with Nio García, Myke Towers, Juanka and Brray)	2020	93	3	1	—	—	—	1	—	—	29	RIAA: 16× Platinum (Latin); PROMUSICAE: 4× Platinum	Now or Never
"Don Don" (with Daddy Yankee and Kendo Kaponi)	2020	—	10	55	—	—	—	16	—	—	101	RIAA: 2× Platinum (Latin); PROMUSICAE: Platinum	El Disco Duro
"Diosa" (remix) (with Myke Towers and Natti Natasha)	2020	—	—	—	—	—	—	35	—	—	135	RIAA: Gold (Latin); PROMUSICAE: Gold	Non-album singles
"Reloj" (with Rauw Alejandro)	2020	— (Note: "Reloj" did not enter the Billboard Hot 100, but peaked at number 25 on the Bubbling Under Hot 100 Singles chart.)	10	11	3	—	—	11	—	—	41	AMPROFON: 2× Diamond+Platinum; PROMUSICAE: 3× Platinum	Afrodisíaco
"Location" (with Karol G and J Balvin)	2021	— (Note: "Location" did not enter the Billboard Hot 100, but peaked at number three on the Bubbling Under Hot 100 chart.)	6	46	9	—	29	13	—	—	63	AMPROFON: Diamond+Platinum+Gold; CAPIF: Gold; RIAA: 6× Platinum (Latin); PROMUSICAE: Platinum	KG0516
"Conversación Con Dios"	2021	—	—	—	—	—	—	—	—	—	—	RIAA: Gold (Latin)	Non-album singles
"Fiel" (remix) (with Wisin and Jhayco featuring Myke Towers and Los Legendarios)	2021	—	—	—	—	—	—	9	—	—	—	RIAA: 8× Platinum (Latin); PROMUSICAE: 2× Platinum	Non-album singles
"Los de Siempre" (with Chris Jedi)	2021	—	21	—	—	—	—	88	—	—	—		Non-album singles
"23 Preguntas"	2021	—	17	—	—	—	—	52	—	—	—	PROMUSICAE: Platinum	Non-album singles
"Ley Seca" (with Jhayco)	2021	— (Note: "Ley Seca" did not enter the Billboard Hot 100, but peaked at number 23 on the Bubbling Under Hot 100 chart.)	12	—	—	—	—	2	—	—	79	PROMUSICAE: 3× Platinum	Timelezz
"Dictadura"	2021	— (Note: "Dictadura" did not enter the Billboard Hot 100, but peaked at number 13 on the Bubbling Under Hot 100 chart.)	12	—	—	—	—	13	—	—	159	PROMUSICAE: Gold	Las Leyendas Nunca Mueren
"Anuel AA: Bzrp Music Sessions, Vol. 46" (with Bizarrap)	2021	—	38	7	—	—	—	3	—	—	122	PROMUSICAE: Platinum	Non-album single
"Leyenda"	2021	—	21	—	—	—	—	51	—	—	—		Las Leyendas Nunca Mueren
"Súbelo" (with Myke Towers and Jhayco)	2021	— (Note: "Súbelo" did not enter the Billboard Hot 100, but peaked at number 15 on the Bubbling Under Hot 100 chart.)	12	—	—	—	—	15	—	—	114	PROMUSICAE: Platinum	Las Leyendas Nunca Mueren
"Si Tú Me Busca" (with Yailin La Más Viral)	2022	—	12	—	—	—	—	97	—	—	—		Non-album singles
"La Llevo al Cielo" (with Chris Jedi and Chencho Corleone featuring Ñengo Flow)	2022	—	29	29	21	—	—	9	—	—	100	PROMUSICAE: 3× Platinum	Non-album singles
"Malo" (with Zion and Randy)	2022	—	38	—	—	—	—	78	—	—	—		LLNM2
"Mercedes Tintia"	2022	—	29	97	—	—	—	38	—	—	177	PROMUSICAE: Gold	LLNM2
"El Nene" (with Foreign Teck)	2022	—	26	—	—	—	—	59	—	—	—	RIAA: 2× Platinum (Latin)	LLNM2
"Diamantes en Mis Dientes" (with Yovngchimi)	2022	—	41	—	—	—	—	—	—	—	—		LLNM2
"Si Yo Me Muero" (with Mvsis)	2022	—	32	—	—	—	—	78	—	—	—		LLNM2
"Más Rica Que Ayer" (with Mambo Kingz and DJ Luian)	2023	— (Note: "Más Rica Que Ayer" did not enter the Billboard Hot 100, but peaked at number five on the Bubbling Under Hot 100 chart.)	16	75	23	—	—	22	—	—	93	RIAA: 8× Platinum (Latin); PROMUSICAE: Platinum	Non-album single
"Diablo, Qué Chimba" (with Maluma)	2023	—	45	—	12	—	—	66	—	—	—		Don Juan
"Triste Verano" (with Eladio Carrión)	2023	—	36	—	—	—	—	22	—	—	—	PROMUSICAE: Gold	Non-album singles
"Mejor Que Yo" (with DJ Luian and Mambo Kingz)	2023	83	17	71	13	—	—	34	—	—	72	PROMUSICAE: Gold	Non-album singles
"Pacto" (remix) (with Jay Wheeler and Hades66 featuring Bryant Myers and Dei V)	2023	—	29	—	20	—	—	29	—	—	168	PROMUSICAE: Platinum	TRAPPii
"Corazón Roto, Pt. 3" (with Brray and Chencho Corleone featuring Jhayco and Ryan Castro)	2023	—	— (Note: "Corazon Roto, Pt. 3" did not enter the Billboard Hot Latin Songs, but peaked at number 19 on the Billboard Latin Rhythm Airplay chart.)	58	5	—	—	—	—	—	—	RIAA: 4× Platinum (Latin)	Non-album singles
"OA" (with Quevedo and Maluma featuring Mambo Kingz and DJ Luian)	2023	—	— (Note: "OA" did not enter the Billboard Hot Latin Songs, but peaked at number 14 on the Billboard Latin Rhythm Airplay chart.)	—	—	—	—	5	—	—	—	RIAA: 4× Platinum (Latin); PROMUSICAE: 3× Platinum	Non-album singles
"Luces Tenues"	2023	—	—	—	—	—	—	—	—	—	—		Non-album singles
"Tacos Gucci"	2024	—	— (Note: "Tacos Gucci" did not enter the Billboard Hot Latin Songs, but peaked at number 10 on the Billboard Latin Rhythm Airplay chart.)	—	—	—	—	43	—	—	—		Non-album singles
"VVS Switch" (remix) (with Pressure 9X19 and Yovngchimi featuring CDobleta, Hades66 and Luar la L)	2024	— (Note: "VVS Switch (Remix)" did not enter the Billboard Hot 100, but peaked at number eight on the Bubbling Under Hot 100 chart.)	15	—	6	—	—	26	—	—	110	PROMUSICAE: Gold	Non-album singles
"Bby Boo" (remix) (with iZaak and Jhayco)	2024	—	27	18	—	—	—	6	—	—	179	RIAA: Platinum (Latin); PROMUSICAE: Platinum	Non-album singles
"Kilerito" (with Brytiago)	2024	—	—	—	—	—	—	68	—	—	—		Non-album singles
"Toki" (with Casper Mágico, Luar la L and iZaak)	2024	—	37	—	—	—	—	54	—	—	—		Non-album singles
"Bellakita" (with Conep)	2024	—	— (Note: "Bellakita" did not enter the Billboard Hot Latin Songs, but peaked at number 23 on the Billboard Latin Rhythm Airplay chart.)	—	—	—	—	—	—	—	—	RIAA: Gold (Latin)	El Plug D3
"XQCP" (with iZaak)	2024	—	—	—	—	—	—	76	—	—	—	RIAA: Gold (Latin)	Non-album singles
"WYA" (remix Black and Yellow) (with J Abdiel and Blessd featuring iZaak and Pirlo)	2024	—	—	10	—	—	—	65	—	—	—	RIAA: Gold (Latin)	Non-album singles
"Razones" (with Ozuna and DJ Luian featuring Mambo Kingz)	2024	—	20	—	—	—	—	21	—	—	—		Non-album singles
"Baby Demon" (with Yovngchimi)	2024	—	36	—	—	—	—	70	—	—	—		Non-album singles
"Serio con ese Q" (with Omar Courtz)	2024	—	43	—	—	—	—	57	—	—	—		Primera Musa
"Shampoo de Coco"	2024	—	—	—	—	—	—	57	—	—	—		TBA
"Headshot"	2024	—	48	—	—	—	—	55	—	—	—		TBA
"Deportivo" (with Blessd)	2024	—	41	48	2	—	—	32	—	—	182		Non-album single
"Bugatti"	2025	—	—	—	—	—	—	52	—	—	—		Non-album single
"Little Demon"	2025	—	—	—	—	—	—	40	—	—	—		Non-album single
"La Bebesita" (with Casper Mágico)	2025	—	—	—	—	—	—	47	—	—	—		
"—" denotes releases that did not chart or were not released in that territory

=== As featured artist ===
List of singles as featured artist, with selected chart positions, showing year released and album name
Title	Year	Peak chart positions									Certifications	Album
Title	Year	US	US Latin	ARG	COL	ITA	MEX	SPA	SWE	SWI	Certifications	Album
"Háblame" (Dvice featuring Anuel AA, Bryant Myers, Lyan and Juanka)	2016	—	—	—	—	—	—	—	—	—	RIAA: Gold (Latin)	Non-album singles
"Ella y Yo" (Pepe Quintana featuring Farruko, Anuel AA, Tempo, Bryant Myers and Almighty or remix featuring Kevin Roldán, Ñengo Flow, Alexis La Bestia and Ñejo)	2016	—	34	—	—	—	—	—	—	—	RIAA: Platinum (Latin); PROMUSICAE: Gold; RIAA: Gold (Latin) (remix)	Non-album singles
"La Ocasión" (DJ Luian, Mambo Kingz and De La Ghetto featuring Arcángel, Ozuna and Anuel AA)	2016	—	21	—	—	—	—	—	—	—	RIAA: 18× Platinum (Latin); PROMUSICAE: Platinum	Non-album singles
"Háblame 2" (Dvice featuring Lary Over, Darkiel, Bryant Myers, Lyan, J King, Ñengo Flow, Alex Kyza, Juanka, Anuel AA and Almighty)	2016	—	—	—	—	—	—	—	—	—	RIAA: Gold (Latin)	Non-album singles
"La Ocasión (remix)" (DJ Luian and Mambo Kingz featuring Ozuna, De La Ghetto, Arcángel, Anuel AA, Daddy Yankee, Nicky Jam, Farruko, J Balvin and Zion)	2017	—	—	—	—	—	—	—	—	—	RIAA: 4× Platinum (Latin)	Non-album singles
"Bebé" (Ozuna featuring Anuel AA)	2017	—	28	—	—	—	—	66	—	—	PROMUSICAE: Gold	Odisea
"Ahora Dice" (remix) (Chris Jedi, J Balvin and Ozuna featuring Cardi B, Offset, Anuel AA and Arcángel)	2018	— (Note: "Ahora Dice" (remix) did not enter the Billboard Hot 100, but peaked at number 4 on the Bubbling Under Hot 100 Singles chart.)	7	—	—	—	— (Note: "Ahora Dice" (remix) did not enter the Billboard Mexico Airplay chart, but peaked at number 43 on the Mexico Espanol Airplay chart.)	—	—	—		Non-album singles
"Thinkin" (Spiff TV featuring Anuel AA, Bad Bunny and Future)	2018	—	—	—	—	—	—	—	—	—	RIAA: Gold (Latin)	Non-album singles
"Bebe" (6ix9ine featuring Anuel AA)	2018	30	1	9	5	68	— (Note: "Bebe" did not enter the Billboard Mexico Airplay chart, but peaked at number 24 on the Mexico Espanol Airplay chart.)	1	62	15	AMPROFON: Platinum; FIMI: Gold; PROMUSICAE: 3× Platinum; RIAA: Platinum (Latin)	Dummy Boy
"Asesina" (remix)" (Brytiago and Darell featuring Daddy Yankee, Ozuna and Anuel AA)	2018	— (Note: "Asesina (Remix)" did not enter the Billboard Hot 100, but peaked at number 13 on the Bubbling Under Hot 100 Singles chart.)	7	11	—	—	— (Note: "Asesina (Remix)" did not enter the Billboard Mexico Airplay chart, but peaked at number 30 on the Mexico Espanol Airplay chart.)	—	—	—	RIAA: 4× Platinum (Latin)	Non-album singles
"Bubalu" (DJ Luian & Mambo Kingz featuring Anuel AA, Prince Royce and Becky G)	2018	—	22	74	33	—	— (Note: "Bubalu" did not enter the Billboard Mexico Airplay chart, but peaked at number 38 on the Mexico Espanol Airplay chart.)	12	—	—	RIAA: 24× Platinum (Latin); PROMUSICAE: 2× Platinum	Non-album singles
"Verte Ir" (DJ Luian & Mambo Kingz featuring Darell, Anuel AA, Nicky Jam and Brytiago)	2019	—	17	32	5	—	—	5	—	—	RIAA: 24× Platinum (Latin); FIMI: Gold; PROMUSICAE: 3× Platinum	Non-album singles
"Tú No Amas" (DJ Luian & Mambo Kingz featuring Anuel AA, Arcángel and Karol G)	2019	—	—	—	—	—	—	39	—	—	RIAA: 8× Platinum (Latin); PROMUSICAE: Gold	Non-album singles
"Baila Baila Baila" (remix) (Ozuna featuring Daddy Yankee, J Balvin, Farruko and Anuel AA)	2019	69	3	19	—	—	— (Note: "Baila Baila Baila" (remix) did not enter the Billboard Mexico Airplay chart, but peaked at number 32 on the Mexico Espanol Airplay chart.)	—	—	—	PROMUSICAE: Platinum	Non-album singles
"Gan-Ga" (remix) (Bryant Myers featuring Anuel AA)	2019	—	11	40	—	—	—	14	—	—	PROMUSICAE: Platinum	Non-album singles
"Elegí" (remix) (Rauw Alejandro, Dalex and Lenny Tavárez featuring Farruko, Anuel AA, Sech, Dímelo Flow, and Justin Quiles)	2020	—	—	—	—	—	—	61	—	—	PROMUSICAE: Gold	Afrodisíaco
"Bad Boy" (Chris Jedi, Gaby Music and Dei V featuring Anuel AA and Ozuna)	2024	—	46	—	—	—	—	19	—	—	PROMUSICAE: Platinum	Los Marcianos Vol.1: Dei V Version
"Cuando No Era Cantante (remix)" (El Bogueto featuring Anuel AA, Fuerza Regida and Yung Beef)	2025	—	10	—	—	—	—	13	—	—		Non-album single
"—" denotes releases that did not chart or were not released in that territory.

=== Promotional singles ===
List of promotional singles, with selected chart positions, showing year released and album name
Title	Year	Peaks	Certifications	Album
Title	Year	US	Certifications	Album
"Uptown Vibes" (Meek Mill featuring Anuel AA and Fabolous)	2018	39	RIAA: Gold	Championships
"Familia" (with Nicki Minaj featuring Bantu)	2018	—		Spider-Man: Into the Spider-Verse
"Vibra" (with David Guetta)	2023	—	PROMUSICAE: Gold	LLNM2
"—" denotes releases that did not chart or were not released in that territory.

== Other charted songs ==
List of other charted songs, with selected chart positions, showing year released and album name
Title	Year	Peak chart positions									Certifications	Album
Title	Year	US	US Latin	ARG	COL	ITA	MEX	SPA	SWI	WW	Certifications	Album
"Tú Me Enamoraste" (remix) (Lary Over featuring Anuel, Bryant Myers, Almighty and Brytiago)	2016	—	—	—	—	—	—	—	—	—	RIAA: Platinum (Latin); PROMUSICAE: Gold	Non-album singles
"Liberace" (Farruko featuring Anuel AA)	2016	—	—	—	—	—	—	—	—	—	RIAA: Gold (Latin)	Non-album singles
"47" (Solo or remix with Ñengo Flow and Farruko featuring Casper Mágico, Darell, Bad Bunny and Lil Geniuz)	2016	—	—	—	—	—	—	—	—	—	RIAA: Gold (Latin); RIAA: Platinum (Latin) (remix); PROMUSICAE: Gold	Non-album singles
"Na' Nuevo"	2018	—	34	—	—	—	—	—	—	—	RIAA: 3× Platinum (Latin); PROMUSICAE: Gold	Real Hasta la Muerte
"Yeezy" (featuring Ñengo Flow)	2018	—	45	—	—	—	—	—	—	—	RIAA: 3× Platinum (Latin); PROMUSICAE: Platinum	Real Hasta la Muerte
"Brindemos" (featuring Ozuna)	2018	—	16	—	—	—	—	67	—	—	RIAA: 7× Platinum (Latin); PROMUSICAE: Platinum	Real Hasta la Muerte
"Quiere Beber"	2018	—	11	34	—	—	— (Note: "Quiere Beber" did not enter the Billboard Mexico Airplay chart, but peaked at number 34 on the Mexico Espanol Airplay chart.)	6	—	—	RIAA: 9× Platinum (Latin); PROMUSICAE: 3× Platinum	Real Hasta la Muerte
"Hipócrita" (featuring Zion)	2018	—	39	84	—	—	—	42	—	—	RIAA: 3× Platinum (Latin); PROMUSICAE: 2× Platinum	Real Hasta la Muerte
"Supuestamente" (Ozuna featuring Anuel AA)	2018	—	32	—	—	—	—	89	—	—	PROMUSICAE: Gold	Aura
"Pasado y Presente" (Ozuna featuring Anuel AA)	2018	—	28	—	—	—	—	92	—	—		Aura
"Única" (remix) (Ozuna featuring Anuel AA and Wisin & Yandel)	2018	—	—	—	—	—	—	57	—	—		Aura
"Mala" (6ix9ine featuring Anuel AA)	2018	— (Note: "Mala" did not enter the Billboard Hot 100, but peaked at number 20 on the Bubbling Under Hot 100 chart.)	7	59	—	21	—	2	80	—	FIMI: Platinum; PROMUSICAE: 3× Platinum	Dummy Boy
"Modo de Avión"	2018	—	—	—	—	—	—	—	—	—	RIAA: Platinum (Latin)	Real Hasta la Muerte
"Bandolera"	2018	—	—	—	—	—	—	—	—	—	RIAA: Platinum (Latin); PROMUSICAE: Platinum	Real Hasta la Muerte
"Pensando en Tí" (featuring Wisin)	2018	—	—	—	—	—	—	—	—	—	RIAA: Platinum (Latin); PROMUSICAE: Gold	Real Hasta la Muerte
"Espina"	2018	—	—	—	—	—	—	—	—	—	RIAA: Platinum (Latin); PROMUSICAE: Gold	Real Hasta la Muerte
"Naturaleza"	2018	—	—	—	—	—	—	—	—	—	RIAA: Platinum (Latin); PROMUSICAE: Gold	Real Hasta la Muerte
"Tú No Lo Amas"	2018	—	—	—	—	—	—	—	—	—	RIAA: Platinum (Latin); PROMUSICAE: Platinum	Real Hasta la Muerte
"Te Necesito"	2018	—	—	—	—	—	—	—	—	—	RIAA: Platinum (Latin); PROMUSICAE: Gold	Real Hasta la Muerte
"Delincuente" (with Farruko and Kendo Kaponi)	2019	—	27	38	—	—	—	24	—	—	AMPROFON: Gold; PROMUSICAE: Platinum	Gangalee
"Tú No Metes Cabra" (remix) (Bad Bunny featuring Daddy Yankee, Anuel AA and Cosculluela)	2019	—	—	—	—	—	—	—	—	—	RIAA: Platinum (Latin)	Non-album single
"Dices Que Te Vas" (Karol G featuring Anuel AA)	2019	—	35	67	—	—	—	—	—	—		Ocean
"Patek" (with Ozuna and Snoop Dogg)	2019	—	49	—	—	—	—	71	—	—		Nibiru
"Está Cabrón Ser Yo" (Bad Bunny featuring Anuel AA)	2020	97	13	—	—	—	—	15	—	—	PROMUSICAE: Platinum	YHLQMDLG
"Jangueo" (with Tego Calderón)	2020	—	16	—	—	—	—	8	—	—	PROMUSICAE: Platinum	Emmanuel
"Fútbol y Rumba" (featuring Enrique Iglesias)	2020	— (Note: "Fútbol y Rumba" has not entered the Billboard Hot 100, but has peaked at number 12 on the Bubbling Under Hot 100 chart.)	8	—	—	—	2	6	96	—	PROMUSICAE: Platinum	Emmanuel
"Hasta Que Dios Diga" (with Bad Bunny)	2020	86	4	33	4	—	—	1	—	—	AMPROFON: Gold; FIMI: Gold; PROMUSICAE: 5× Platinum	Emmanuel
"Reggaetonera"	2020	—	12	—	—	—	—	15	—	—	AMPROFON: Gold; PROMUSICAE: 2× Platinum	Emmanuel
"El Manual"	2020	—	38	—	—	—	—	1	—	—	PROMUSICAE: 3× Platinum	Emmanuel
"Narcos"	2020	—	13	—	—	—	—	15	—	—	PROMUSICAE: Platinum	Emmanuel
"Así Soy Yo" (with Bad Bunny)	2020	—	14	—	—	—	—	29	—	—	PROMUSICAE: Gold	Emmanuel
"Que Se Joda" (with Farruko and Zion)	2020	—	32	—	—	—	—	41	—	—		Emmanuel
"Bandido" (with Mariah)	2020	—	44	—	—	—	—	43	—	—	PROMUSICAE: Gold	Emmanuel
"Somo o No Somos"	2020	—	26	—	—	—	—	50	—	—		Emmanuel
"Ferrari" (with Lil Wayne)	2020	—	29	—	—	—	—	53	—	—		Emmanuel
"Antes y Después" (with Kendo Kaponi, Yandel and Ñengo Flow)	2020	—	23	—	—	—	—	60	—	—		Emmanuel
"El Problema"	2020	—	45	—	—	—	—	72	—	—		Emmanuel
"No Llores Mujer" (with Travis Barker)	2020	—	50	—	—	—	—	88	—	—		Emmanuel
"Tocándote"	2020	—	—	—	—	—	—	96	—	—		Emmanuel
"Por Mi Reggae Muero 2020" (with Yandel)	2020	—	50	—	—	—	—	81	—	—	RIAA: Gold (Latin); PROMUSICAE: Gold	Quién Contra Mí 2
"100" (with Ozuna)	2021	—	16	—	—	—	—	23	—	—		Los Dioses
"Los Dioses" (with Ozuna)	2021	— (Note: "Los Dioses" did not enter the Billboard Hot 100, but peaked at number five on the Bubbling Under Hot 100 chart.)	8	—	—	—	—	10	—	92	PROMUSICAE: Gold	Los Dioses
"Antes" (with Ozuna)	2021	100	5	77	12	—	16	4	—	76	PROMUSICAE: Platinum	Los Dioses
"Municiones" (with Ozuna)	2021	—	30	—	—	—	—	40	—	—		Los Dioses
"Dime Tú" (with Ozuna)	2021	—	27	—	—	—	—	50	—	—		Los Dioses
"RD" (with Ozuna)	2021	—	17	—	—	—	—	31	—	—		Los Dioses
"Nena Buena" (with Ozuna)	2021	—	23	—	—	—	—	28	—	—	PROMUSICAE: Gold	Los Dioses
"Contra el Mundo" (with Ozuna)	2021	—	42	—	—	—	—	76	—	—		Los Dioses
"Perreo" (with Ozuna)	2021	—	32	—	—	—	—	37	—	—		Los Dioses
"Perfecto" (with Ozuna)	2021	—	35	—	—	—	—	77	—	—		Los Dioses
"La María" (with Ozuna)	2021	—	18	—	—	—	—	65	—	—		Los Dioses
"Nunca" (with Ozuna)	2021	—	25	—	—	—	—	46	—	—		Los Dioses
"Real Hasta la Muerte"	2021	—	31	—	—	—	—	—	—	—		Las Leyendas Nunca Mueren
"North Carolina" (featuring Eladio Carrión)	2021	—	24	—	—	—	—	78	—	—	PROMUSICAE: Gold	Las Leyendas Nunca Mueren
"Rick Flair"	2021	—	41	—	—	—	—	—	—	—		Las Leyendas Nunca Mueren
"1942"	2021	—	39	—	—	—	—	—	—	—		Las Leyendas Nunca Mueren
"Pin"	2021	—	44	—	—	—	—	—	—	—		Las Leyendas Nunca Mueren
"McGregor"	2021	—	25	—	—	—	—	58	—	—	PROMUSICAE: Gold	Las Leyendas Nunca Mueren
"Llorando en un Ferrari"	2021	—	33	—	—	—	—	49	—	—		Las Leyendas Nunca Mueren
"Esa Cruz"	2021	—	48	—	—	—	—	—	—	—	PROMUSICAE: Gold	Las Leyendas Nunca Mueren
"¿Qué Nos Pasó?"	2022	—	43	—	—	—	—	60	—	—	PROMUSICAE: Platinum	Non-album singles
"Delincuente" (with Tokischa and Ñengo Flow)	2022	—	27	—	—	—	—	—	—	—	AMPROFON: Platinum; RIAA: 4× Platinum (Latin); PROMUSICAE: Platinum	Non-album singles
"Nosotros"	2022	—	47	—	—	—	—	—	—	—		LLNM2
"Brother"	2022	—	—	—	—	—	—	79	—	—	PROMUSICAE: Gold	LLNM2
"La 2blea"	2022	—	29	—	—	—	—	91	—	—		LLNM2
"La Máquina" (with Jowell & Randy & De La Ghetto featuring Yailin La Más Viral)	2022	—	23	—	—	—	—	79	—	—		LLNM2
"Sufro" (with Kodak Black and Ñengo Flow)	2022	—	44	—	—	—	—	—	—	—		LLNM2
"Brrr"	2022	—	40	—	—	—	—	98	—	—		LLNM2
"Duro" (with Chris Jedi and Gaby Music featuring Jenny la Sexy Voz)	2022	—	21	—	—	—	—	74	—	—	PROMUSICAE: Gold	Non-album singles
"Presidentes Muertos" (with Casper Mágico and Bryant Myers featuring Yovngchimi)	2022	—	—	—	—	—	—	—	—	—	RIAA: Platinum (Latin)	Non-album singles
"Mi Exxx" (with Wisin)	2023	—	40	—	—	—	—	57	—	—	RIAA: 2× Platinum (Latin)	Mr. W
"Pa Ti Estoy" (with Ozuna and Chris Jedi)	2023	—	—	—	—	—	—	81	—	—	PROMUSICAE: Gold	Cosmo
"Pórtate Bonito" (with Blessd and Ovy on the Drums)	2025	—	26	—	—	—	—	65	—	—		Non-album singles
"Yogurcito" (remix) (with Blessd, Kris R. and Luar la L featuring Roa and Yan Block)	2025	—	—	—	—	—	—	8	—	—		Non-album singles
"—" denotes releases that did not chart or were not released in that territory.

== Other appearances ==
List of guest appearances showing year released and album name
Title	Year	Other performer(s)	Album
"Diablita"	2016	Trap Capos, Noriel, Baby Rasta	Trap Capos: Season 1
"Get Money"	2019	Akon	None
"Special"	2019	Gucci Mane	Delusions of Grandeur
"Lemonade" (Latin remix)	2020	Internet Money, Gunna, Don Toliver, Nav	None
"Whoopty" (Latin remix)	2021	CJ, Ozuna	Loyalty Over Royalty (Deluxe)
"Button"	2021	Maroon 5, Tainy	Jordi (Deluxe)
"Mr. Jones" (remix)	2021	Pop Smoke	Faith (Deluxe)
"Los Illuminaty"	2022	Rochy RD	None
"Muevelo"	2022	Black Eyed Peas, Marshall Jefferson	Elevation
"Podemos Repetirlo" (remix)	2023	Don Omar, Chencho Corleone	None
"Para Siempre"	2023	Zion & Lennox	None
"Oh Na Na"	2023	Nio Garcia	Anto-Nio
"Alcohol"	2023	Marshmello	Sugar Papi
"Carbon 15"	2024	Ñengo Flow	RealG4Life Vol. 4
"Rebound"	2024	Jennifer Lopez	This is Me... Now (Deluxe)
"No Te Quieren Conmigo" (remix)	2024	Gaby Music, Luar la L, Lunay, Bryant Myers	None
"ARCOBALENO"	2026	Geolier	Tutto è possibile
