= Las Leyendas Nunca Mueren Tour =

2022–23 concert tour by Anuel AA

- Tour by Anuel AA
- Location: South America; Europe; North America
- Associated albums: Las Leyendas Nunca Mueren; LLNM2
- Start date: April 30, 2022
- End date: December 10, 2023
- No. of shows: 45
- Website: https://anuelaa.com

Anuel AA concert chronology
- Emmanuel Tour (2020); Las Leyendas Nunca Mueren Tour (2022); Rompecorazones Tour (2023)

The Las Leyendas Nunca Mueren Tour was the fourth concert tour by Puerto Rican rapper and singer-songwriter Anuel AA to promote his third and fourth studio solo albums Las Leyendas Nunca Mueren and LLNM2. Promoted by Real Hasta la Muerte, LLC, it began on April 30, 2023, in Miami, Florida and concluded on December 6 in Quito, Ecuador, comprising 45 dates over 39 cities throughout North America, South America and Europe. A second part of the tour titled Legends Never Die USA Tour was announced with new dates of the postponed concerts in the United States. It began on April 28, 2023, in Orlando, Florida and concluded on December 10, 2023, in Washington.

== Background ==
In March 2022, Anuel AA announced a tour in North America, South America and Europe titled Las Leyendas Nunca Mueren Tour associated with his fourth studio solo album Las Leyendas Nunca Mueren as much as his upcoming album LLNM2. In late July, 2023, he stated that all the concerts in the United States in August and October were postponed because he wanted to take a break because he wanted to "recharge my batteries" and concentrate more on his personal life.

In February 2023, Anuel AA announced the Legends Never Die Tour alongside his upcoming extended play Rompecorazones (cancelled later). The concerts in the United States were rescheduled with new dates on the line.

== Special guests ==
- DaBaby on April 30, 2022, in Las Vegas
- Yailin La Más Viral on July 8, 2022, in Barcelona and July 16, 2022, in Rome
- Bryant Myers on April 28, 2023, in Orlando
- Farruko, Wisin, Ozuna and Maluma in Miami on April 29, 2023
- Peso Pluma on May 12, 2023, in Los Angeles
- Tokischa and El Alfa on May 28, 2023, in New York City

== Set list ==
This set list is representative of the show on May 22, 2023, in Viña del Mar. It is not representative of all concerts for the duration of the tour.

1. "Real Hasta la Muerte"
2. "Medusa"
3. "Amanece"
4. "China"
5. "Adicto"
6. "Súbelo"
7. "Leyenda"
8. "Ley Seca"
9. "Otro Trago" (remix)
10. "Delincuente"
11. "Baila Baila Baila (remix)"
12. "Quiere Beber"
13. "Brindemos"
14. "Hasta Que Dios Diga"
15. "Me Contagié"
16. "Sola (remix)"
17. "Esclava (remix)"
18. "Ayer"
19. "Bebé"
20. "La Ocasión"
21. "Verte Ir"
22. "Fiel (remix)"
23. "47"
24. "Narcos"
25. "Bebe"
26. "Está Cabrón Ser Yo"
27. "La Llevo al Cielo"
28. "¿Qué Nos Pasó?"
29. "La Jeepeta (remix)"
30. "Reloj"
31. "McGregor"

== Tour dates ==
| Date | City | Country | Venue |
Leg 1 – Las Leyendas Nunca Mueren Tour
| April 30, 2022 | Las Vegas | United States | Las Vegas Festival Grounds |
| May 19, 2022 | Buenos Aires | Argentina | Movistar Arena (Buenos Aires) |
| May 21, 2022 | Lima | Peru | Estadio Universidad San Marcos |
| May 28, 2022 | Viña del Mar | Chile | Quinta Vergara |
| May 31, 2022 | Santiago | Chile | Movistar Arena (Santiago) |
| June 13, 2022 | Ibiza | Spain | Platja d'en Bossa |
| June 17, 2022 | Santiago de Compostela | Spain | Auditorio Monte do Gozo |
| June 18, 2022 | Oropesa del Mar | Spain | Marina d'Or |
| June 20, 2022 | Ibiza | Spain | Platja d'en Bossa |
| June 24, 2022 | Zurich | Switzerland | Halle 622 |
| June 25, 2022 | Asturias | Spain | Oscar Niemeyer International Cultural Centre |
| June 27, 2022 | Ibiza | Spain | Platja d'en Bossa |
| July 1, 2022 | Las Vegas | United States | Resorts World Las Vegas |
| July 3, 2022 | Madrid | Spain | Caja Mágica |
| July 4, 2022 | Ibiza | Spain | Platja d'en Bossa |
| July 8, 2022 | Barcelona | Spain | Poble Espanyol |
| July 10, 2022 | Benidorm | Spain | Estadio Municipal Guillermo Amor |
| July 15, 2022 | Milan | Italy | Assago Summer Arena |
| July 16, 2022 | Rome | Italy | Via Appia Nuova |
| July 17, 2022 | Mallorca | Spain | Mateu Cañellas Municipal Sports Center |
| July 22, 2022 | Valencia | Spain | Playa de Cullera |
| July 23, 2022 | Almería | Spain | Recinto de las Canteras |
| August 5, 2022 | Cádiz | Spain | El Puerto de Santa Maria |
| August 6, 2022 | Marbella | Spain | Estadio de Fútbol San Pedro de Alcantara |
| August 12, 2022 | Rosarito | Mexico | Papas n' Beer |
| August 19, 2022 | Rosarito | Mexico | Papas n' Beer |
| November 26, 2022 | Mexico City | Mexico | Autódromo Hermanos Rodríguez |
| December 2, 2022 | Monterrey | Mexico | Fundidora Park |
| December 3, 2022 | Guadalajara | Mexico | Carretera Guadalajara |
| December 8, 2022 | Quito | Ecuador | Parque Bicentenario de Quito |
Leg 2 – Legends Never Die USA Tour
| April 28, 2023 | Orlando | United States | Kia Center |
| April 29, 2023 | Miami | United States | Kaseya Center |
| April 30, 2023 | Fort Myers | United States | Hertz Arena |
| May 5, 2023 | Dallas | United States | American Airlines Center |
| May 6, 2023 | Houston | United States | Smart Financial Centre |
| May 7, 2023 | Hidalgo | United States | Payne Arena |
| May 12, 2023 | Los Angeles | United States | Kia Forum |
| May 13, 2023 | Ontario | United States | Toyota Arena |
| May 14, 2023 | San Jose | United States | SAP Center |
| May 22, 2023 | Chicago | United States | Allstate Arena |
| May 21, 2023 | Charlotte | United States | Spectrum Center |
| May 26, 2023 | Reading | United States | Santander Arena |
| May 27, 2023 | Newark | United States | Prudential Center |
| May 28, 2023 | New York City | United States | Madison Square Garden |
| December 10, 2023 | Washington | United States | Capital One Arena |

== Cancelled shows ==
List of cancelled concerts, showing date, city, country, venue, and reason for cancellation
| Date | City | Country | Venue | Reason |
|---|---|---|---|---|
| May 24, 2022 | Antofagasta | Chile | Casino Enjoy de Antofagasta | Organization problems |
| May 26, 2022 | Coquimbo | Chile | Estadio Francisco Sánchez Rumoroso | Organization problems |
| June 11, 2022 | Bilbao | Spain | Bilbao Arena | Technical and personal issues |
| June 23, 2022 | Badajos | Spain | Recinto Ferial Badajoz | Technical and personal issues |
| July 29, 2022 | Rimini | Italy | Rimini Beach Arena | Unknown |
| July 30, 2022 | Tenerife | Spain | Amarilla Golf | Organization problems |
