= Rompecorazones Tour =

2023 concert tour by Anuel AA

- Tour by Anuel AA
- Location: North America; Europe; South America
- Start date: July 21, 2023
- End date: October 3, 2023
- No. of shows: 14
- Website: https://anuelaa.com

Anuel AA concert chronology
- Las Leyendas Nunca Mueren Tour (2022-2023); Rompecorazones Tour (2023); Europe Tour (2024)

The Rompecorazones Tour was the fifth concert tour by Puerto Rican rapper and singer-songwriter Anuel AA to promote his first extended play Rompecorazones, which was cancelled later. Promoted by Real Hasta la Muerte, it began on July 21, 2023, in Miami, Florida and concluded on September 30 in Panama City, Panama, comprising 14 dates over 14 cities throughout North America, Europe and South America.

== Background ==
In 2022, Anuel AA started his Las Leyendas Nunca Mueren Tour in South America and Europe, which was associated with his third solo studio album Las Leyendas Nunca Mueren. Unfortunately, he wanted to take a break because he wanted to "recharge my batteries" and concentrate more on his personal life.

In 2023, Anuel AA announced the Legends Never Die Tour alongside his upcoming extended play Rompecorazones, which started in North America. Right after its end he started the new tour in July, 2023, titled Rompecorazones Tour. The first show of the tour was on July 21, 2023, at the Rolling Loud festival in Miami, Florida, becoming the first Latin singer to participate alongside Yovngchimi.

The Rompecorazones tour ended on October 3, 2023, in Santiago, Chile. The last show of the tour was supposed to take place on October 28, 2023, in Guatemala City, Guatemala. However, Anuel AA was subjected to an unexpected emergency surgery. That was the reason cancellation of the show and his upcoming extended play Rompecorazones.

== Set list ==
This set list is representative of the show on September 2, 2023, in Lima. It is not representative of all concerts for the duration of the tour.

1. "Más Rica Que Ayer"
2. "Amanece"
3. "Sola (remix)"
4. "Quiere Beber"
5. "Medusa"
6. "47"
7. "La Jeepeta (remix)"
8. "Delincuente"
9. "Baila Baila Baila (remix)"
10. "Otro Trago" (remix)
11. "Me Gusta"
12. "Leyenda"
13. "Verte Ir"
14. "Adicto"
15. "Delincuente"
16. "Hasta Que Dios Diga"
17. "La Ocasión"
18. "Esclava (remix)"
19. "Ella y Yo"
20. "Pacto (remix)"
21. "Me Contagié"
22. "23 Preguntas"
23. "Culpables"
24. "Secreto"
25. "Reloj"
26. "Bebe"
27. "China"
  Encore
28. "Brindemos"

== Tour dates ==
Date	City	Country	Venue
July 21, 2023 (Note: The July 21, 2023, in Miami was part of the 2023 Rolling Loud festival)	Miami	United States	Hard Rock Stadium
July 22, 2023 (Note: The July 22, 2023, in Barcelona was part of Reggaeton Beach Festival 2023)	Barcelona	Spain	Parc del Fòrum
July 23, 2023 (Note: The July 23, 2023, in Madrid was part of Reggaeton Beach Festival 2023)	Madrid	Spain	Caja Mágica
July 27, 2023 (Note: The July 27, 2023, in Milan was part of Milano Latin Festival 2023)	Milan	Italy	Forum di Milano
July 28, 2023 (Note: The July 28, 2023, in Almería was part of Marble Dream Music 2023)	Almería	Spain	Recinto de las Canteras
July 29, 2023 (Note: The July 29, 2023, in Murcia was part of Marble Dream Music 2023)	Murcia	Spain	Polideportivo San Javier
July 30, 2023 (Note: The July 30, 2023, in Santander was part of Reggaeton Beach Festival 2023)	Santander	Spain	Virgen del Mar
August 4, 2023 (Note: The August 4, 2023, in Valencia was part of Arenal Sound 2023)	Valencia	Spain	Acampada Malvarrosa Arenal Sound
August 5, 2023 (Note: The August 5, 2023, in Cádiz was part of Puro Latino Festival 2023)	Cádiz	Spain	El Puerto de Santa Maria
August 6, 2023 (Note: The August 6, 2023, in Nigrán was part of Reggaeton Beach Festival 2023)	Nigrán	Spain	Parque Empresarial Porto do Molle
September 1, 2023 (Note: The September 1, 2023, in Asunción was part of Super Festival 1)	Asunción	Paraguay	Jockey Club
September 2, 2023 (Note: The September 2, 2023, in Lima was part of Reggaeton Lima Festival 2023)	Lima	Peru	Estadio Universidad San Marcos
September 3, 2023 (Note: The September 3, 2023, in Santiago was part of Super Festival 2)	Santiago	Chile	Movistar Arena
September 30, 2023	Panama City	Panama	Figali Convention Center

== Cancelled shows ==
List of cancelled concerts, showing date, city, country, venue, and reason for cancellation
Date	City	Country	Venue	Reason
August 29, 2024 (Note: The August 29, 2023, in Montevideo was part of the O2 Urban Fest)	Montevideo	Uruguay	Antel Arena	Financial problems
October 28, 2024	Guatemala City	Guatemala	Explanada Cayala	Health issues
