= Headshot (disambiguation) =

A head shot is a specific type of portrait where the focus is on person's face.

Head shot or headshot may also refer to:

== Film ==
- Headshot (2011 film), a Thai thriller film directed by Pen-Ek Ratanaruang
- Headshot (2016 film), an Indonesian martial arts action film directed by The Mo Brothers
- Bullet to the Head (working title: Headshot), a 2012 American action thriller film directed by Walter Hill

== Television ==
- "Head Shots", a 2013 episode of the American television drama series The Killing
- "Headshot", a 2005 episode of the American television sitcom series Yes, Dear

== Music ==
- Headshots: Se7en, a compilation album by the American hip hop duo Atmosphere
- "Headshot" (Lil Tjay, Polo G and Fivio Foreign song), a 2021 song by Lil Tjay, Polo G, and Fivio Foreign
- "Headshot" (Anuel AA song), 2024
- "Headshots (4r da Locals)" a 2021 song by Isaiah Rashad from The House Is Burning
- "Headshot", a 2026 song by Hakos Baelz from Mirror Mirror

== Games ==
- Headshot, in video gaming, an attack aimed at the target's head
- Headshot, a time-out inducing action according to National Dodgeball League rules
