= Llorando en un Ferrari =

2021 single by Anuel AA

Song by Anuel AA

from the album Las Leyendas Nunca Mueren
- Language: Spanish
- Released: November 26, 2021
- Genre: Electropop; Electronic dance music
- Length: 3:14
- Label: Real Hasta la Muerte
- Songwriters: Emmanuel Gazmey Santiago; Tyshane Thompson; Max Borghetti; Gabriel Mora Quintero; Dim Crux
- Producers: Boombox Cartel; Machael; EQ el Equalizer; Benjamin Lasnier; Max Borghetti; Dim Crux

Music video
- "Llorando en un Ferrari" on YouTube

"Llorando en un Ferrari" is a song by Puerto Rican rapper Anuel AA. It was released through Real Hasta la Muerte on December 3, 2021 as a track on the album Las Leyendas Nunca Mueren (2021). The song is primarily an EDM and electropop track that also combines elements from Anuel AA's urban style. A music video was released on December 3, 2021.

== Background ==
In late-November, 2021, Anuel AA announced his third solo studio album Las Leyendas Nunca Mueren, and "Llorando en un Ferrari" was included as the seventh track. A day before the album release, he posted a preview of the song on TikTok. On November 26, 2021, an audio visualizer of the song was uploaded to YouTube along with the other song visualizers that appeared on the album.

== Composition ==
Anuel AA wrote "Llorando en un Ferrari" with Puerto Rican rapper and singer Mora alongside Beam and Dim Crux. It was produced by Boombox Cartel, Machael, EQ el Equalizer, Benjamin Lasnier, Max Borghetti and Dim Crux. In an interview for El Guru in Apple Music, Anuel AA stated that this song was the last one he wrote for the album and was the first time he was the first time was confident with a mainstream song after "China". In the lyrics, the rapper makes reference to Ricky Martin's "Livin' la Vida Loca" and Maná's "En el muelle de San Blas".

== Commercial performance ==
"Llorando en un Ferrari" debuted and peaked at number 33 on the US Billboard Hot Latin Songs chart on December 11, 2022. In Spain's official weekly chart, it debuted at number 49. The song also reached the top of the charts in Ecuador, El Salvador and Mexico and peaked also at number 2 in Peru, at number 4 in Guatemala and at number 6 in Panama.

== Music video ==
The music video for "Llorando en un Ferrari" was released on December 3, 2021. It was filmed in Miami, Florida and produced by Fernando Lugo. It shows Anuel AA suffering a road accident and has references from his other music videos including the music videos for the songs "Leyenda" and "Súbelo". At the end, Anuel AA pays homage to UFC star Conor McGregor and teased his next music video for the song "McGregor".

== Charts ==
Chart performance for "Llorando en un Ferrari"
Chart (2021)	Peak position
Costa Rica (Monitor Latino)	11
Ecuador (Monitor Latino)	1
El Salvador (Monitor Latino)	1
Guatemala (Monitor Latino)	4
Mexico (Monitor Latino)	1
Panama (Monitor Latino)	6
Peru (Monitor Latino)	2
Spain (PROMUSICAE)	49
US Hot Latin Songs (Billboard)	33
