= Ley Seca (song) =

2021 single by Jhayco and Anuel AA

Single by Jhayco and Anuel AA

from the album Timelezz
- Language: Spanish
- Released: September 2, 2021
- Genre: Reggaeton
- Length: 4:23
- Label: Universal Latino
- Songwriters: Jhayco; Anuel AA; Tainy; Juno Watt; Gale
- Producer: Tainy

Jhayco singles chronology
"Nos Matamos" (2021)	"Ley Seca" (2021)	"Emojis de Corazones" (2021)

Anuel AA singles chronology
"23 Preguntas" (2021)	"Ley Seca" (2021)	"Dictadura" (2021)

Music video
- "Ley Seca" on YouTube

"Ley Seca" is a song by Puerto Rican rappers Jhayco and Anuel AA. It was released on September 2, 2021 through Universal Music Latino. The song was released as the sixth single from Jhayco's second studio album Timelezz. The song peaked at number 23 on the Billboard Bubbling Under Hot 100 chart and at number 12 on the Hot Latin Songs chart. Furthermore, the song managed to reach the summit of the Latin Airplay chart, marking Jhayco's fourth and Anuel's tenth song to achieve this feat.

== Background ==
Anuel AA announced through his Instagram account a new collaboration with Jhayco in a video in which Anuel AA can be seen showing off the design of his Bugatti Veyron along with the background song. Finally the song came out on September 2 and not on September 3 as planned, Jhayco announced that the song was the sixth single from his next studio album which was coming out in a few days.

== Composition and lyric ==
The song was produced by renowned Puerto Rican producer Tainy and co-written by Juno Watt and Puerto Rican singer Gale. The song is a reggaeton rhythm, the lyrics refer to the parties in the clubs, implying that the clubs are already opening this because most of them around the world were closed due to the COVID-19 pandemic.

== Music video ==
The music video was released the same day the single was released and was directed by Santiago Laffe, the music video reached one million views on YouTube in just one hour.

== Charts ==
=== Weekly charts ===
Chart (2021)	Peak position
Bolivia (Monitor Latino)	15
Colombia (Promúsica)	18
Costa Rica (Monitor Latino)	12
Global 200 (Billboard)	79
Guatemala (Monitor Latino)	4
Honduras (Monitor Latino)	8
Nicaragua (Monitor Latino)	12
Panama (Monitor Latino)	5
Paraguay (SGP)	28
Puerto Rico (Monitor Latino)	13
Spain (Promusicae)	2
US Bubbling Under Hot 100 (Billboard)	23
US Hot Latin Songs (Billboard)	12
US Latin Airplay (Billboard)	1
US Latin Rhythm Airplay (Billboard)	1

=== Year-end charts ===
Chart (2021)	Position
US Hot Latin Songs (Billboard)	84

== Certifications ==
Region	Certification	Certified units/sales
Spain (Promusicae)	3× Platinum	120,000^{‡}
Streaming
Central America (CFC)	Platinum	7,000,000^{†}
^{‡} Sales+streaming figures based on certification alone.^{†} Streaming-only figures based on certification alone.

== See also ==
- List of Billboard Hot Latin Songs and Latin Airplay number ones of 2022
