= North Carolina (song) =

Song by Anuel AA featuring Eladio Carrión

from the album Las Leyendas Nunca Mueren
- Language: Spanish
- Released: November 26, 2021
- Genre: Latin trap
- Length: 2:56
- Label: Real Hasta la Muerte
- Songwriters: Emmanuel Gazmey Santiago; Eladio Carrión Morales
- Producers: Pru; Ninesoul

Music video
- "North Carolina" on YouTube

"North Carolina" is a song by Puerto Rican rapper Anuel AA featuring American rapper Eladio Carrión. It was released through Real Hasta la Muerte on November 26, 2021, as a track from the album Las Leyendas Nunca Mueren (2021). A music video was released on January 28, 2021.

== Background ==
In November 2021, Eladio Carrión posted a preview of a song with Anuel AA, which wasn't include in the later's upcoming album. A photos of Carrión and Anuel AA working in a music studio were leaked in social media. In November 2021, Anuel AA announced his third solo studio album Las Leyendas Nunca Mueren, and the song was included as the second track. On November 26, 2021, an audio visualizer of the song was uploaded to YouTube along with the other song visualizers that appeared on the album.

== Composition ==
"North Carolina" was written by Anuel AA and Eladio Carrión and produced by Pru and Ninesoul. In an interview for El Guru in Apple Music, Anuel AA stated Carrión was his favourite Spanish rapper at the moment. He also said he is impressed by his professionalism and described the work with him as "legendary".

The song is a reflection on mistrust, luxurious lifestyle, internal conflicts, and the perception of fame and success from the singers’ perspective. Anuel AA and Carrión sing about the lack of trust in the people around them, reflecting a feeling of loneliness and distrust even in the shadows and in relationships. It also describes personal experiences related to drug use, luxury, and the pressure of fame, as well as the management of interpersonal relationships in the midst of this environment. In the lyrics, Anuel AA mentions global football stars Lionel Messi, Sergio Ramos and Neymar. He also confirmed his separation with Colombian singer Karol G: Ya no estoy con Karol y no e' un misterio (I am no longer with Karol and it's not a mystery).

== Commercial performance ==
"North Carolina" debuted and peaked at number 24 on the US Billboard Hot Latin Songs chart dated December 11, 2021. In Spain's official weekly chart, it debuted at number 78 on the PROMUSICAE chart dated November 26, 2021.

== Music video ==
The music video for "North Carolina" was released on January 28, 2021. It was produced by Javi Neris and Anuel AA and was filmed in Ensanche Capotillo in Santo Domingo, Dominican Republic. The video features the participation of Dominican dembow artists Rochy RD and Yailin La Más Viral.

== Charts ==
Chart performance for "North Carolina"
Chart (2021)	Peak position
Spain (Promusicae)	78
US Hot Latin Songs (Billboard)	24

== Certifications ==
Certifications and sales for "North Carolina"
Region	Certification	Certified units/sales
Spain (Promusicae)	Gold	30,000^{‡}
^{‡} Sales+streaming figures based on certification alone.
