= Keii (song) =

2020 single by Anuel AA

Single by Anuel AA
- Language: Spanish
- Released: February 7, 2020
- Genre: Dembow; reggaeton
- Length: 3:30
- Label: Real Hasta la Muerte; Sony Latin
- Producers: Chris Jedi; Gaby Music

Anuel AA singles chronology
"Medusa" (2020)	"Keii" (2020)	"Fantasías (remix)" (2020)

Music video
- "Keii" on YouTube

"Keii" (transl. "Respect") is a song by Puerto Rican rapper and singer Anuel AA and was released on February 7, 2020. The song debuted at number two in Spain and reached number 83 on the US Billboard Hot 100.

== Composition ==
"Keii" was described as a "laid-back dembow swing". In the song, the singer name-drops several songs from fellow artists, such as Daddy Yankee's "Con Calma", Bad Bunny's "Callaíta", Don Omar's "Hasta Abajo", DJ Snake's "Taki Taki", Nio García's "Te Boté", Nicky Jam and J Balvin's "X" and more.

== Music video ==
The video was released on February 7, 2020, and portrays the artist as Dracula. It was directed by Spiff TV. The storyline was compared to a "gothic romance" in which the singer lures a woman from her wedding into a dark world full of "rampant pleasure".

== Charts ==
=== Weekly charts ===
Weekly chart performance for "Keii"
Chart (2020)	Peak position
Argentina Hot 100 (Billboard)	33
Puerto Rico (Monitor Latino)	13
Spain (PROMUSICAE)	2
US Billboard Hot 100	83
US Hot Latin Songs (Billboard)	3
US Latin Airplay (Billboard)	1
US Latin Rhythm Airplay (Billboard)	1
US Rolling Stone Top 100	69

=== Year-end charts ===
2020 year-end chart performance for "Keii"
Chart (2020)	Position
Chile Airplay (Monitor Latino)	48
Colombia Streaming (Monitor Latino)	62
Dominican Republic Streaming (Monitor Latino)	85
El Salvador Airplay (Monitor Latino)	94
El Salvador Streaming (Monitor Latino)	75
Latin America Airplay (Monitor Latino)	64
Latin America Streaming (Monitor Latino)	43
Honduras Airplay (Monitor Latino)	97
Panama Airplay (Monitor Latino)	67
Paraguay Airplay (Monitor Latino)	96
Puerto Rico Airplay (Monitor Latino)	70
Puerto Rico Streaming (Monitor Latino)	56
Spain (PROMUSICAE)	57
US Hot Latin Songs (Billboard)	28
US Latin Airplay (Monitor Latino)	99
US Latin Streaming (Monitor Latino)	38

== Certifications ==
Certifications and sales for "Keii"
Region	Certification	Certified units/sales
Mexico (AMPROFON)	Platinum+Gold	90,000^{‡}
Spain (Promusicae)	2× Platinum	200,000^{‡}
^{‡} Sales+streaming figures based on certification alone.

== See also ==
- List of Billboard Hot Latin Songs and Latin Airplay number ones of 2020
