= Headshot (Anuel AA song) =

2024 single by Anuel AA

Single by Anuel AA
- Language: Spanish
- Released: September 19, 2024
- Genre: Latin trap
- Length: 6:49
- Label: Real Hasta la Muerte
- Songwriter: Emmanuel Gazmey
- Producers: EZ Made da Beat; Nely el Arma Secreta; Prida; Jaco

Anuel AA singles chronology
| "Shampoo de Coco" (2024) | "Headshot" (2024) |

Music video
- "Headshot" on YouTube

"Headshot" is a song by Puerto Rican rapper Anuel AA. It was released by Real Hasta la Muerte on September 19, 2024. The song is written by Anuel AA with EZ Made da Beat, Nely el Arma Secreta, Prida and Jaco handling the production.

== Composition ==
The song is divided into two parts, with the melody changing in the second part. Anuel AA generated controversy by mentioning Colombian singer and songwriter Feid. He also mentioned globally famous singers including Travis Scott, Ariana Grande, Mac Miller and Central Cee.

== Music video ==
The music video was released on September 19, 2024, on Anuel AA's YouTube channel. It was directed by Spiff TV in collaboration with Netflix and contains the participation of American actor and WWE superstar Dave Bautista. In the music video, Anuel AA plays the role of Blaze who is going to avenge his brother who was murdered by drug dealers.

== Charts ==
| Chart (2024) | Peak position |
|---|---|
| Spain (PROMUSICAE) | 55 |
| US Hot Latin Songs (Billboard) | 48 |
