= Amanece =

2018 single by Anuel AA and Haze

Single by Anuel AA and Haze
- Language: Spanish
- Released: December 14, 2018
- Genre: Reggaeton
- Length: 3:10
- Label: House of Haze; Cinq Music Group
- Songwriters: Emmanuel Gazmey Santiago; Egbert Rosa; Jesús Manuel Nieves Cortés
- Producer: Fino como el Haze

Anuel AA singles chronology
| "A Solas (remix)" (2018) | "Amanece" (2018) | "Secreto" (2019) |

Music video
- "Amanece" on YouTube

"Amanece" (English: "Dawn") is a song by Puerto Rican rapper Anuel AA and Puerto Rican producer and songwriter Fino como el Haze, simply known as Haze. It was released through House of Haze and Cinq Music Group on December 14, 2018. Anuel AA and Fino como el Haze wrote the song alongside Puerto Rican rapper and singer Jhayco.Amanece" by Anuel AA and Haze is featured on Cocoteo FM, a radio station in Grand Theft Auto VI (GTA 6)

== Background and composition ==
In October, 2018, Anuel AA posted a preview for his upcoming single with Puerto Rican producer Fino como el Haze titled "Amanece". In the song, Anuel AA sings about a woman with whom he wants to enjoy an entire night until dawn. He also name-drops songs from fellow artists, such as Karol G's Mi Cama and Becky G's "Sin Pijama": Y como Karol G en mi cama / Como Becky G sin pijama.

== Music video ==
The music video for "Amanece" was released on December 14, 2018, at the same day the song came out, in Anuel AA's YouTube channel. It reached more than 850 million views.

== Charts ==
Chart performance for "Amanece"
| Chart (2018) | Peak position |
|---|---|
| Argentina Hot 100 (Billboard) | 17 |
| Dominican Republic (Monitor Latino) | 20 |
| Mexico Espanol Airplay (Billboard) | 46 |
| Nicaragua (Monitor Latino) | 9 |
| Spain (Promusicae) | 4 |
| US Latin Airplay (Billboard) | 46 |
| US Latin Pop Airplay (Billboard) | 39 |
| US Latin Rhythm Airplay (Billboard) | 24 |
| US Hot Latin Songs (Billboard) | 11 |
| US Latin Digital Song Sales (Billboard) | 5 |

== Certifications ==
Certifications and sales for "Amanece"
| Region | Certification | Certified units/sales |
|---|---|---|
| Italy (FIMI) | Platinum | 200,000^{‡} |
| Spain (Promusicae) | 7× Platinum | 700,000^{‡} |
| United States (RIAA) | 47× Platinum (Latin) | 2,820,000^{‡} |
^{‡} Sales+streaming figures based on certification alone.
