= 23 Preguntas =

Single by Anuel AA
- Language: Spanish
- Released: August 23, 2021
- Genre: Latin pop
- Length: 4:10
- Label: Real Hasta la Muerte
- Producers: Frabian Eli; Jug; Taz Taylor; Census

Anuel AA singles chronology
"Los De Siempre" (2021)	"23 Preguntas" (2021)	"Ley Seca" (2021)

Music video
- "23 Preguntas" on YouTube

"23 Preguntas" is a song by Puerto Rican rapper and singer Anuel AA. It was released by Real Hasta la Muerte on August 23, 2021, for digital download and streaming. Dedicated to his ex-girlfriend Karol G, the song is influenced by 50 Cent's 21 Questions.

== Background ==
In August, 2021, Anuel AA confirmed the release of his next single "23 Preguntas" uploading a preview of the outro for the song. The title is associated with the date August 23, 2018, marking three years since Anuel AA and Karol G recorded the video for their first collaboration "Culpables".

== Composition ==
"23 Preguntas" was produced by Anuel AA's ex-manager Frabian Eli and American producers Taz Taylor, Jug and Census. The intro and the outro of the song contain additional vocals by Puerto Rican singer and rapper Rauw Alejandro. As its name suggests, the theme has 23 questions that are revealed during the song. "23 Preguntas" shows the feelings Anuel AA still had for Karol G after both artists confirmed their separation in early 2021. The song culminated all those expressions, confirming his feelings, and partly revealing the reasons why this relationship ended despite their great complicity.

== Music video ==
The music video for "23 Preguntas" was produced by Abez Media and released on August 23, 2021, at the same day the song came out, in Anuel AA's YouTube channel. It reached more than 244 million views. In the video, Anuel AA revealed the title of his upcoming studio album Las Leyendas Nunca Mueren.

== Charts ==
Chart performance for "23 Preguntas"
Chart (2021)	Peak position
Spain (PROMUSICAE)	52
US Hot Latin Songs (Billboard)	17

== Certifications ==
Certifications and sales for "23 Preguntas"
Region	Certification	Certified units/sales
Spain (PROMUSICAE)	Platinum	60,000^{‡}
^{‡} Sales+streaming figures based on certification alone.
