= Dictadura =

Single by Anuel AA

from the album Las Leyendas Nunca Mueren
- Language: Spanish
- Released: October 28, 2021
- Genre: Reggaeton
- Length: 3:28
- Label: Real Hasta la Muerte
- Songwriters: Emmanuel Gazmey; Gabriel Mora Quintero; Cromo X; Machael; Freddy "El Syntethyzer"
- Producers: Subelo Neo; Mora; Cromo X; Machael

Anuel AA singles chronology
"Ley Seca" (2021)	"Dictadura" (2021)	"Anuel AA: Bzrp Music Sessions, Vol. 46" (2021)

Music video
- "Dictadura" on YouTube

"Dictadura" (transl. "Dictatorship") is a song by Puerto Rican rapper and singer Anuel AA and was released on October 28, 2021. It was released as the first single from his upcoming album Las Leyendas Nunca Mueren. The song debuted at number 13 in Spain and reached number 13 on the US Billboard Bubbling Under Hot 100.

== Composition ==
In the song, the singer name-drops several songs from fellow artists, such as Bad Bunny's "Amorfoda", Don Omar's "Danza Kuduro" and his ex Karol G's El Makinon.

== Music video ==
The video was released on October 28, 2021 and was directed by Anuel AA.

== Charts ==
Chart performance for "Dictadura"
Chart (2021)	Peak position
Global 200 (Billboard)	159
Spain (Promusicae)	13
US Bubbling Under Hot 100 (Billboard)	13
US Hot Latin Songs (Billboard)	12
US Latin Airplay (Billboard)	49
US Latin Rhythm Airplay (Billboard)	25

== Certifications ==
Certifications and sales for "Dictadura"
Region	Certification	Certified units/sales
Spain (Promusicae)	Gold	20,000^{‡}
^{‡} Sales+streaming figures based on certification alone.
