= Súbelo =

2021 single by Anuel AA, Myke Towers and Jhayco

Single by Anuel AA, Myke Towers and Jhayco

from the album Las Leyendas Nunca Mueren
- Language: Spanish
- Released: November 18, 2021
- Genre: Reggaeton
- Length: 4:00
- Label: Real Hasta la Muerte
- Songwriters: Emmanuel Gazmey Santiago; Michael Anthony Torres Monge; Jesús Manuel Nieves Cortés
- Producer: Ovy on the Drums

Anuel AA singles chronology
| "Leyenda" (2021) | "Súbelo" (2021) | "Si Tú Me Busca" (2022) |

Myke Towers singles chronology
| "La Llamada" (2021) | "Súbelo" (2021) | "Jóvenes Millonarios" (2021) |

Jhayco singles chronology
| "Holy Shit" (remix) (2021) | "Súbelo" (2021) | "Está Dañada" (remix) (2021) |

Music video
- "Súbelo" on YouTube

"Súbelo" is a song by Puerto Rican singers Anuel AA, Myke Towers and Jhayco. It was released through Real Hasta la Muerte on November 18, 2021, as the third single from the album Las Leyendas Nunca Mueren (2021), which revealed the official cover of the album.

== Background ==
In January, 2021, a short preview of a song between Anuel AA, Myke Towers and Jhayco became viral. In mid-November, 2021, Anuel AA posted official preview for the song with moments from filming of its music video. After the release of "Súbelo", he announced his third solo studio album Las Leyendas Nunca Mueren, and the song was included as the fifteenth track.

== Composition ==
Anuel AA, Myke Towers and Jhayco wrote the song alongside Colombian producer Ovy on the Drums who literally produced it. In an interview for El Guru in Apple Music, Anuel AA described it as "perfect" and stated that "Súbelo" was the first song he recorded in his home country Puerto Rico after being released from prison.

== Commercial performance ==
"Súbelo" did not enter the Billboard Hot 100, but peaked at number 15 on the Bubbling Under Hot 100 chart. The song debuted and peaked at number 12 on the US Billboard Hot Latin Songs chart on November 12, 2022. In Spain's official weekly chart, it debuted at number 15.

"Súbelo" debuted at number 114 on the Billboard Global 200 on the issue dated December 4, 2021. The song also peaked at the top of the chart in Dominican Republic and at number 6 in El Salvador.

== Music video ==
The music video for "Súbelo" was released on December 18, 2021. It was filmed at the LoanDepot Park in Miami, Florida and produced by Fernando Lugo and Anuel AA. It shows the artists participating in a baseball game. In the video, Anuel AA pays homage to Major League Baseball stars including Robinson Canó, Miguel Rojas and Guillermo Heredia.

== Charts ==
Chart performance for "Súbelo"
| Chart (2021) | Peak position |
|---|---|
| Dominican Republic (Monitor Latino) | 1 |
| Global 200 (Billboard) | 114 |
| El Salvador (Monitor Latino) | 6 |
| US Bubbling Under Hot 100 (Billboard) | 15 |
| Spain (Promusicae) | 15 |
| US Hot Latin Songs (Billboard) | 12 |
| US Latin Airplay (Billboard) | 50 |
| US Latin Rhythm Airplay (Billboard) | 23 |
| US Latin Digital Song Sales (Billboard) | 7 |

== Certifications ==
Certifications and sales for "Súbelo"
| Region | Certification | Certified units/sales |
|---|---|---|
| Spain (Promusicae) | Platinum | 60,000^{‡} |
^{‡} Sales+streaming figures based on certification alone.
