= VVS Switch =

2023 single by Pressure 9x19

Single by Pressure 9x19
- Language: Spanish
- Released: October 10, 2023; March 15, 2024 (remix)
- Genre: Latin trap
- Length: 2:48; 9:15 (remix)
- Label: Stash Money Way; Glizzy Gvng; 10K Projects
- Producer: Young Pepo

Pressure 9x19 singles chronology
"VVS Switch" (2023)	"El Rey De Las Rapidas" (2023)

Anuel AA singles chronology
"Tacos Gucci" (2024)	"VVS Switch (remix)" (2024)	"Bby Boo (remix)" (2024)

Yovngchimi singles chronology
"Las Gatas (Dembow)" (2023)	"VVS Switch (remix)" (2024)	"9x19/300BLK" (2024)

CDobleta singles chronology
"Funny" (2024)	"VVS Switch (remix)" (2024)	"Fulete" (2024)

Hades66 singles chronology
"AKrusi" (2024)	"VVS Switch (remix)" (2024)	"RPG" (2024)

Luar la L singles chronology
"Al Otro Nivel" (2024)	"VVS Switch (remix)" (2024)	"KTM" (2024)

Music video
- "VVS Switch" on YouTube

"VVS Switch" is a song by Puerto Rican rapper Pressure 9X19. It was released by Stash Money Way as his debut single on October 10, 2023. The song contains samples of "What You Won't Do for Love" performed by Bobby Caldwell. Due to its popularity, the song got later remixed by Puerto Rican rappers Anuel AA, Yovngchimi, Hades66, Luar la L and CDobleta. In August 2024, Hades66 was removed from the official remix version in all music platforms.

== Commercial performance ==
"VVS Switch (remix)" did not enter the Billboard Hot 100, but debuted at number eight on the Bubbling Under Hot 100 chart. On the US Billboard Hot Latin Songs chart dated March 30, 2023, the song debuted at number 15 which was Pressure 9X19 and CDobleta's first entry in Billboard charts. On the Billboard Global 200 chart, it debuted at number 110 on the chart dated March 30, 2023. "VVS Switch (remix)" peaked at number 26 in Spain's official chart. It appeared also in the Billboard charts in Colombia (6), Ecuador (9) and Spain (14).

== Controversy ==
In the remix version, Anuel AA mentioned Puerto Rican rappers Tempo and Cosculluela. He announced via Kick that firstly, he wished to mention American rapper Arcángel, but the version got later cancelled. He was also criticised for mentioning Colombian singer Feid.

In August, 2024, the music video for "VVS Switch (remix)" was deleted by YouTube at the request of La Positiva Entertainment. Later, Hades66 was removed from the remix version in all music platforms because of issues between La Positiva Entertainment and Money Wayy.

== Music video ==
The music video was released at October 10, 2024, on Pressure 9x19's Youtube channel. It filmed and directed by Chinola Films and has received more than 38 million views on YouTube. The music video for the remix version was released on March 15, 2024 and was directed by QuePasoJefe. In August, 2024, the music video of "VVS Switch (remix)" was deleted.

== Charts ==
Chart performance for "VVS Switch (remix)"
Chart (2023)	Peak position
Chile (Billboard)	24
Colombia (Billboard)	6
Ecuador (Billboard)	9
Global 200 (Billboard)	110
Spain (PROMUSICAE)	26
Spain (Billboard)	14
US Bubbling Under Hot 100 (Billboard)	8
US Hot Latin Songs (Billboard)	15

== Certifications ==
Certifications for "VVS Switch" (remix)"
Region	Certification	Certified units/sales
Spain (Promusicae)	Gold	30,000^{‡}
^{‡} Sales+streaming figures based on certification alone.
