= Medusa (Jhayco, Anuel AA and J Balvin song) =

2020 single by Jhayco, Anuel AA and J Balvin

Single by Jhayco, Anuel AA and J Balvin
- Language: Spanish
- Released: February 5, 2020
- Genre: Latin trap
- Length: 5:04
- Label: Universal Music Latin
- Songwriters: Jesús Nieves Cortés; Emmanuel Gazmey Santiago; José Álvaro Osorio Balvín; Misael De La Cruz; Elvin Roubert; Josias De La Cruz; Michael Masis; Nydia Yera; Sergio Roldan
- Producers: Nely El Arma Secreta; M. De La Cruz; Fino como el Haze; Fabiana Olive; Botlok; Ammu-Nation

Jhayco singles chronology
"Easy (remix)" (2019)	"Medusa" (2020)	"Dispo" (2020)

Anuel AA singles chronology
"Me Gusta" (2020)	"Medusa" (2020)	"Keii" (2020)

J Balvin singles chronology
"Morado" (2020)	"Medusa" (2020)	"Rojo" (2020)

Music video
- "Medusa" on YouTube

"Medusa" is a song by Puerto Rican rappers Jhayco and Anuel AA and Colombian singer J Balvin. It was released on February 5, 2020, through Universal Music Latin. The song is inspired by the logo of the Italian luxury fashion company Versace.

== Background ==
On January 29, 2019, a song containing vocals by Jhayco and Anuel AA was leaked online. The appearance of J Balvin in its official version was confirmed in February, 2020, before the release of the song.

== Commercial performance ==
"Medusa" did not enter the Billboard Hot 100, but peaked at number 19 on the Bubbling Under Hot 100 chart. The song debuted and peaked at number 12 on the US Billboard Hot Latin Songs chart on February 22, 2020. In Spain's official weekly chart, it debuted and peaked at number five on the chart dated February 7, 2020. In Argentina, "Medusa" appeared at number 57.

== Music video ==
The music video was uploaded to YouTube on Jhayco's YouTube channel on February 5, 2023. It was directed by Fernando Lugo and reached more than 373 million views.

== Charts ==
Chart performance for "Medusa"
Chart (2020)	Peak position
Argentina Hot 100 (Billboard)	57
Dominican Republic (Monitor Latino)	7
Honduras (Monitor Latino)	3
Nicaragua (Monitor Latino)	8
Spain (PROMUSICAE)	5
US Bubbling Under Hot 100 (Billboard)	19
US Hot Latin Songs (Billboard)	12

== Certifications ==
Certifications and sales for "Medusa"
Region	Certification	Certified units/sales
Spain (Promusicae)	Platinum	40,000^{‡}
United States (RIAA)	Diamond (Latin)	600,000^{‡}
^{‡} Sales+streaming figures based on certification alone.
