= Bby Boo =

2023 single by iZaak

Single by iZaak
- Released: December 22, 2023
- Genre: Latin R&B; Latin trap; reggaeton
- Length: 2:56; 4:35 (remix)
- Label: Ican; Warner Music Latina
- Songwriters: Isaak Ortiz; Jesús Manuel Nieves Cortés; Emmanuel Gazmey Santiago; Baruc Omar Castro Batista; Johnny Oscar López; Jorge Valdés Vázquez
- Producers: Barvc; BK; Dímelo Flow

IZaak singles chronology
"Bonnie and Clyde" (remix) (2023)	"Bby Boo" (2023)	"No Es Suficiente" (2024)

Jhayco singles chronology
"KTM" (2024)	"Bby Boo" (remix) (2024)	"Torii" (2024)

Anuel AA singles chronology
"VVS Switch" (remix) (2024)	"Bby Boo" (remix) (2024)	"No Te Quieren Conmigo" (remix) (2024)

Music video
- "Bby Boo (Remix)" on YouTube

"Bby Boo" is a song by Puerto Rican singer iZaak. It was produced by Barvc, BK and Panamian producer Dímelo Flow and was released on December 22, 2023, through Warner Music Latina. iZaak and Dímelo Flow wrote the song alongside producers Barvc and BK. The song got remixed later by the appearance of Puerto Rican rappers Jhayco and Anuel AA on March 27, 2024.

== Background and release ==
After the remix of "Bonnie and Clyde" with Luar La L and Omar Courtz, iZaak released his new song titled "Bby Boo". It came out on December 22, 2023, and was made available worldwide on all music platforms. "Fame Icon" magazine describes the song as "a musical odyssey" for unbreakable romantic ties which is "a celebration of love and partnership".

=== Remix ===
After the release of "Bby Boo", an Anuel AA AI-made remix of the song became popular on social media. It inspired both iZaak and Anuel AA to make it happen. Later Anuel AA and Jhayco were seen filming the official video of the remix as much as a preview of the song intro. Later iZaak revealed that the remix will come out very soon. The song and its official music video got leaked one week before its release. Then iZaak announced the date for the remix release.

"Bby Boo" (Remix) was released on March 27, 2024, and was made available worldwide on all music platforms.

== Commercial performance ==
On the US Billboard Hot Latin Songs chart dated April 12, 2024, the song debuted at number 27. On the Billboard Global 200 the song debuted at number 179 on the chart dated April 12, 2024.

On the Argentina Hot 100 chart dated April 12, 2024, the song debuted at number 76. A new peak of number 20 was reached on the chart dated May 18, 2024.

In Spain, the song debuted at number 11 on the chart dated March 28, 2024. It reached a new peak of number six on the chart dated April 12, 2024. In April 2024, the song was given a Gold certification from PROMUSICAE.

== Controversy ==
In the remix, Anuel AA mentioned Puerto Rican rapper Arcángel claiming that their feud is still ongoing: "Me pongo como Héctor y la arrodillo como Arca" (I get up like Héctor and she kneels like Arca). Anuel AA initials here the physical alteration between Puerto Rican rapper Héctor el Father and Arcángel in 2006.

== Music video ==
A music video was released for both the original song, on December 22, 2023, and for the remix, the latter, on March 27, 2024, featuring iZaak, Jhayco and Anuel AA dancing together. Both music videos are available on iZaak's YouTube channel.

== Track listing ==
Digital download / streaming
No.	Title	Length
1.	"Bby Boo" (remix)	4:35
2.	"Bonnie and Clyde" (remix)	4:46
3.	"Bby Boo"	2:56

== Charts ==
Chart performance for "Bby Boo" (Remix)
Chart (2024)	Peak position
Argentina Hot 100 (Billboard)	18
Chile (Billboard)	13
Colombia (Billboard)	21
Costa Rica (Monitor Latino)	11
Dominican Republic (Monitor Latino)	19
Global 200 (Billboard)	179
Peru (Billboard)	22
Spain (PROMUSICAE)	6
Spain (Billboard)	6
US Hot Latin Songs (Billboard)	27

== Certifications ==
Certifications and sales for "Bby Boo" (Remix)
Region	Certification	Certified units/sales
Spain (PROMUSICAE)	Platinum	60,000^{‡}
United States (RIAA)	4× Platinum (Latin)	240,000^{‡}
^{‡} Sales+streaming figures based on certification alone.
