= Jhayco =

Puerto Rican singer (born 1993)

- Also known as: Jhay Cortez; La Presión
- Born: Jesús Manuel Nieves Cortés; April 9, 1993 (age 33); Río Piedras, San Juan, Puerto Rico
- Genres: Reggaeton; Latin trap; Latin hip hop; Latin R&B
- Occupations: Rapper; singer; songwriter; record producer
- Instrument: Vocals
- Years active: 2013–present
- Label: Universal Latino

Jesús Manuel Nieves Cortés (born April 9, 1993), known professionally as Jhayco (/ˈdʒeɪkoʊ/; formerly Jhay Cortez), is a Puerto Rican rapper and singer. After releasing multiple EPs, his debut studio album, Famouz, was released in 2019.

== Early life ==
Cortés was born in Río Piedras, Puerto Rico. Later, he moved to Camden, New Jersey, where he learned English.

Cortés began songwriting at the age of 15, gaining the interest of producer Eddie Dee. Cortés wrote music with Lele el Arma Secreta and Eliel, who introduced Cortés to the duo Zion & Lennox. Cortés composed three songs that featured on Zion & Lennox's 2011 album Los Verdaderos: "Como curar," "Detective de tu amor," and "Soltera" (under the pseudonym Jay el Superdotado).

Cortés wrote five singles for Tito El Bambino, including "Llama al Sol," featured on his 2011 album Invencible, which won a Latin Grammy for Best Tropical Album.

== Career ==
In 2013, Cortés began as a singer for the Latin pop group Stereo 4, composed of four Puerto Rican singers: Jafet Cortes, Eduardo Esteras, Rubén Chinea, and Jesús M. Nieves. Cortés later launched his career as a soloist. He collaborated with Stereo 4 for the last time in 2016 with the song "Te quiero ver."

On August 22, 2017, Cortés was the first artist signed under House of Haze, a partnership established between Universal Music Latino and producer Fino como el Haze. He released his first single, "Donde no se vea," under this label, collaborating with Jory Boy and Pusho.

On March 16, 2018, Cortés performed at SXSW's Sounds from Puerto Rico showcase.

Cortés helped in the composition of the songs "Criminal" by Natti Natasha with Ozuna and "Mi Religión" by Yandel. On May 16, 2018, he released the EP Eyez on Me under the Universal Music Latino record label. At the end of 2018, he released his single "Costear" with Almighty, which led to the release of two remixes.

On February 22, 2019, Cortés released the single "No Me Conoce," which reached the top of several Latin American music charts. It was certified triple platinum by PROMUSICAE of Spain; the song also featured a remix with J Balvin and Bad Bunny and was certified 20× platinum by the RIAA. In that same year, he also released the song "Deseame suerte" with the collaboration of Karol G. On May 24, 2019, he released his first studio album, Famouz, under the Universal Music Latino label. It was ranked 164 on the US Billboard 200 chart and was certified triple platinum by the RIAA.

In 2020, Cortés published a special edition of his first studio album with unreleased songs under the name Famouz Reloaded and released a new single, "Dime a Ve," which would be part of his second album, Timelezz. He was also the winner of five ASCAP awards as a composer and two Tú Música Urbano Awards in the categories of Composer of the Year and New Generation Album by Famouz. He received nominations for the Billboard Awards for Latin music, Premios Juventud, Lo Nuestro Awards, and the Latin Grammys. On October 30, he released the song "Dakiti" in collaboration with Bad Bunny, which reached number one on the Billboard Global 200 charts; it also reached the top 10 of the Billboard Hot 100, reaching number 9. At the end of that year, he collaborated on the Blue Grand Prix remix of "La Curiosidad" by Jay Wheeler and Myke Towers. He also appeared on Yandel's album Quien Contra Mí 2 in the collaboration of the song "Ponme al día."

At the beginning of 2021, Cortés participated in a production of Los Legendarios with the song "Fiel" with Wisin, which reached number 9 globally on the Spotify music platform. On March 14, he appeared with Bad Bunny performing "Dakiti" at the Grammy Awards ceremony. He also received another iHeartRadio Music Awards nomination in the Latin Pop/Reggaeton Song of the Year category for "Dakiti." He then appeared on the remix of 911 by Panamanian singer Sech.

On September 3, he released his album "Timelezz", featuring collaborations with Anuel AA, Skrillex, Myke Towers, Kendo Kaponi, Arcángel and Buscabulla. The album hit #2 on the Billboard Top Latin Albums chart. Later that year, he was a part of Anuel AA's Súbelo, with Myke Towers.

In 2022, he released "En La De Ella" with Feid and Sech.

In 2023, he released "Holanda". He was also a part of Tainy's album Data, on the song "FANTASMA | AVC".

In 2024, he released his album, "Le Clique: Vida Rockstar (X)". The 29-track album features collaborations with Quevedo, Yandel, DJ Khaled, Omar Courtz, Yovngchimi, and many others. He also formed part of the remix of Si No Es Contigo by Cris MJ, along with Kali Uchis.

== Personal life ==
Cortez was in a relationship with pornographic film actress and webcam model Mia Khalifa.

== Controversies ==
In 2020, Cortez had a public spat with fellow rapper Bryant Myers on Twitter. The two rappers published diss tracks.

In December 2021, Cortez threw jabs at fellow artist Rauw Alejandro, comparing his dance moves to that of a cockroach on Ankhal's Si Pepe remix. Rauw would respond with the diss track "Hunter", saying Cortez's verse on the 911 (Remix) was written by Mora. Cortez then released "Enterrauw", a seven minute diss track.

On August 12, 2025, Cortez was arrested in Miami after deputies allegedly found cocaine and cannabis in his car during a traffic stop. He was later bonded out of jail.

== Discography ==
=== Studio albums ===
List of studio albums with selected chart positions
Title	Album details	Peak chart positions			Certifications
Title	Album details	US	US Latin	SPA	Certifications
Famouz	Released: May 24, 2019; Label: Universal Music Latino	164	5	54	RIAA: 3× Platinum (Latin)
Famouz Reloaded	Released: January 24, 2020; Label: Universal Music Latino	—	—	54	
Timelezz	Released: September 3, 2021; Label: Universal Music Latino	70	2	4	RIAA: Platinum (Latin); PROMUSICAE: Gold
Le Clique: Vida Rockstar (X)	Released: September 6, 2024; Label: Universal Music Latino	77	6	1	RIAA: 2× Platinum (Latin)
"—" denotes a recording that did not chart or was not released in that territory.

=== EPs ===
List of EPs
Title	EP details
Eyez on Me	Released: May 18, 2018; Label: Universal Music Latino

=== Singles ===
==== As lead artist ====
List of singles as lead artist, with selected chart positions and certifications, showing year released and album name
Title	Year	Peak chart positions						Certifications	Album
Title	Year	US	US Latin	ARG	MEX	SPA	WW	Certifications	Album
"Deseos" (with Bryant Myers)	2018	—	—	—	—	—	—	RIAA: Gold (Latin)	Eyez on Me
"Se Supone" (remix) (with Darell and Ñengo Flow featuring Miky Woodz, Almighty and Myke Towers)	2018	—	—	—	—	—	—	RIAA: Gold (Latin)	Eyez on Me
"Están Pa' Mí" (with J Balvin)	2018	—	—	—	—	—	—	RIAA: Gold (Latin)	Eyez on Me
"Costear" (with Almighty)	2018	—	—	—	—	—	—	RIAA: Gold (Latin)	Famouz
"No Me Conoce" (or remix with J Balvin and Bad Bunny)	2019	71	4	4	—	4	—	FIMI: Gold; PROMUSICAE: 4× Platinum; RIAA: 9× Diamond (Latin) (remix)	Famouz
"Deséame Suerte" (with Karol G and Haze)	2019	—	—	—	—	—	—	RIAA: Gold (Latin)	Famouz Reloaded
"A Tu Manera (Corbata)" (with Sofía Reyes)	2019	—	—	85	25	—	—		Mal de Amores
"Easy" (remix) (with Ozuna)	2019	—	33	—	—	—	—		Famouz Reloaded
"Medusa" (with Anuel AA and J Balvin)	2020	— (Note: "Medusa" did not enter the Billboard Hot 100, but peaked at number 19 on the Bubbling Under Hot 100 Singles chart.)	12	57	—	5	—	RIAA: Diamond (Latin); PROMUSICAE: Platinum	Non-album single
"Dispo" (with Brytiago)	2020	—	—	—	—	—	—	RIAA: Gold (Latin)	Orgánico
"Dime a Ve"	2020	—	—	—	—	—	—	RIAA: Gold (Latin)	Non-album single
"Prendemos" (with Haze and Lunay)	2020	—	—	—	—	—	—	RIAA: 2× Platinum (Latin)	Non-album single
"Dakiti" (with Bad Bunny)	2020	5	1	1	32	1	—	FIMI: 3× Platinum; RIAA: 24× Platinum (Latin); PROMUSICAE: 8× Platinum	El Último Tour Del Mundo
"Kobe en LA"	2020	—	44	—	—	—	—	RIAA: Gold (Latin)	Non-album single
"Los Bo" (with Myke Towers)	2021	—	40	—	—	46	—	RIAA: Gold (Latin)	Timelezz
"Fiel" (with Los Legendarios and Wisin or remix with Anuel AA featuring Myke Towers)	2021	62	5	8	—	1	—	FIMI: Gold; RIAA: 14× Platinum (Latin); PROMUSICAE: 5× Platinum; RIAA: 8× Platinum (Latin) (remix); PROMUSICAE: Platinum (remix)	Los Legendarios 001
"Christian Dior"	2021	—	28	—	—	27	—	PROMUSICAE: Gold	Timelezz
"911" (remix) (with Sech)	2021	—	—	—	—	11	—	PROMUSICAE: Platinum	Non-album singles
"Súbele el Volumen" (with Daddy Yankee and Myke Towers)	2021	—	—	—	2	62	—		Non-album singles
"En Mi Cuarto" (with Skrillex)	2021	—	22	—	—	31	—	RIAA: 2× Platinum (Latin); PROMUSICAE: Gold	Timelezz
"Delincuente" (with Sebastián Yatra)	2021	—	—	—	—	94	—		Non-album single
"Ley Seca" (with Anuel AA)	2021	— (Note: "Ley Seca" did not enter the Billboard Hot 100, but peaked at number 23 on the Bubbling Under Hot 100 Singles chart.)	12	—	—	2	—	PROMUSICAE: 3× Platinum	Timelezz
"Emojis de Corazones" (with Wisin and Ozuna featuring Los Legendarios)	2021	—	22	—	—	68	—	RIAA: Platinum (Latin); PROMUSICAE: Gold	Multimillo Vol. 1
"Súbelo" (with Anuel AA and Myke Towers)	2021	— (Note: "Súbelo" did not enter the Billboard Hot 100, but peaked at number 15 on the Bubbling Under Hot 100 Singles chart.)	12	—	—	15	—	PROMUSICAE: Platinum	Las Leyendas Nunca Mueren
"Sensual Bebé"	2022	—	22	—	—	28	—	PROMUSICAE: Gold	LCVRX
"Ande con Quien Ande" (with Myke Towers)	2022	—	49	—	—	56	—	RIAA: Platinum (Latin); PROMUSICAE: Gold	Non-album single
"En la de Ella" (with Feid and Sech)	2022	—	—	—	—	20	—	PROMUSICAE: Platinum	LCVRX
"Cuerpecito"	2023	—	—	—	—	38	—	PROMUSICAE: Gold	LCVRX
"Mami Chula" (with Quevedo)	2023	—	—	—	—	5	—	PROMUSICAE: 2× Platinum	LCVRX
"Fantasma/AVC" (with Tainy)	2023	—	—	—	—	69	—	PROMUSICAE: Gold	Data
"En To Lao" (with Haze)	2023	—	—	—	—	51	—	PROMUSICAE: Platinum	Non-album single
"Rockstar 2.0" (with Duki)	2023	—	—	16	—	26	—	PROMUSICAE: Gold	Antes de Ameri
"Holanda"	2023	—	—	21	—	3	54	RIAA: 4× Platinum (Latin); PROMUSICAE: 3× Platinum	LCVRX
"Ex-Special" (with Peso Pluma)	2023	— (Note: "Ex-Special" did not enter the Billboard Hot 100, but peaked at number 14 on the Bubbling Under Hot 100 Singles chart.)	22	—	—	58	—		LCVRX
"Bby Boo (remix)" (with Izaak and Anuel AA)	2024	—	27	18	—	6	179	RIAA: Platinum (Latin); PROMUSICAE: Platinum	Non-album single
"Passoa" (with Kapo)	2024	—	—	—	—	36	—		Non-album single
"58" (with Dei V)	2024	—	—	—	—	38	—		Le Clique: Vida Rockstar (X)
"Scorpio"	2025	—	—	—	—	92	—		Non-album singles
"Rosita" (with Tainy and Rauw Alejandro)	2026	—	—	—	—	—	192		Non-album singles
"—" denotes a recording that did not chart or was not released in that territory.

==== As featured artist ====
List of singles as featured artist, with selected chart positions and certifications, showing year released and album name
Title	Year	Peak chart positions				Certifications	Album
Title	Year	US	US Latin	ARG	SPA	Certifications	Album
"Darte" (remix) (Alex Rose featuring Casper Mágico, Noriel, Bryant Myers, Juhn, Jhayco, Miky Woodz, Ñengo Flow and Myke Towers)	2018	—	—	—	—	RIAA: 4× Platinum (Latin)	Sexflix 1.5
"Only Fans" (remix) (Young Martino, Lunay and Myke Towers featuring Joyce Santana, Brray, Jhayco, Darell, Arcángel and Ñengo Flow)	2020	—	—	—	94	RIAA: 2× Platinum (Latin)	Non-album singles
"La Curiosidad" (Blue Grand Prix remix) (Jay Wheeler, Myke Towers and Rauw Alejandro featuring DJ Nelson, Jhayco, Lunay and Kendo Kaponi)	2020	—	—	—	14		Non-album singles
"—" denotes a recording that did not chart or was not released in that territory.

=== Other charted and certified songs ===
List of other charted and certified songs, with selected chart positions and certifications, showing year released and album name
Title	Year	Peak chart positions				Certifications	Album
Title	Year	US	US Latin	ARG	SPA	Certifications	Album
"Easy"	2019	—	—	—	5	RIAA: 3× Platinum (Latin); PROMUSICAE: 3× Platinum	Famouz
"Imaginaste" (with Tainy)	2019	—	45	75	—	RIAA: Platinum (Latin)	Famouz
"Como Se Siente"	2020	—	—	—	6	RIAA: Gold (Latin); PROMUSICAE: Platinum	Famouz Reloaded
"Como Se Siente" (remix) (with Bad Bunny)	2020	—	7	61	—		Las que no iban a salir
"512" (with Mora)	2021	—	—	24	8	PROMUSICAE: 2× Platinum	Primer Día de Clases
"Magnum" (with Nicky Jam)	2021	—	41	—	78		Infinity
"Dile (Homenaje)"	2021	—	—	—	5	PROMUSICAE: 2× Platinum	Timelezz
"La Venganza" (with J Balvin)	2021	—	46	—	—		Jose
"Memorias" (with Mora)	2022	—	—	—	6	PROMUSICAE: 6× Platinum	Microdosis
"Tarot" (with Bad Bunny)	2022	18	7	52	2	PROMUSICAE: 5× Platinum	Un Verano Sin Ti
"Llueve" (with Wisin & Yandel and Sech)	2022	—	—	—	92	RIAA: Gold (Latin)	La Última Misión
"Porshe Carrera" (with Yandel and Haze)	2024	—	—	—	79		Le Clique: Vida Rockstar (X)
"No Entiendo" (with Eladio Carrión and Omar Courtz)	2024	—	—	—	80		Le Clique: Vida Rockstar (X)
"—" denotes a recording that did not chart or was not released in that territory.

== Awards and nominations ==
Award	Year	Recipient(s) and nominee(s)	Category	Result	Ref.
American Music Awards	2021	"Dakiti" (with Bad Bunny)	Collaboration of the Year	Nominated	
American Music Awards	2021	"Dakiti" (with Bad Bunny)	Favorite Song - Latin	Nominated	
American Music Awards	2022	Himself	Favorite Male Latin Artist	Nominated	
ASCAP Latin Awards	2020	"Amanece" (as songwriter)	Winning Songs	Won	
ASCAP Latin Awards	2020	"Hola" (as songwriter)	Winning Songs	Won	
ASCAP Latin Awards	2020	"Loco Contigo" (as songwriter)	Winning Songs	Won	
ASCAP Latin Awards	2020	"No Me Conoce (Remix)	Winning Songs	Won	
ASCAP Latin Awards	2020	"Reggaeton" (as songwriter)	Winning Songs	Won	
ASCAP Latin Awards	2021	"Adicto" (as songwriter)	Winning Songs	Won	
ASCAP Latin Awards	2021	"Agua" (as songwriter)	Winning Songs	Won	
ASCAP Latin Awards	2021	"Dakiti" (with Bad Bunny)	Winning Songs	Won	
ASCAP Latin Awards	2022	"Dakiti" (with Bad Bunny)	Song of the Year	Won	
ASCAP Latin Awards	2022	"Fiel" (with Wisin)	Winning Songs	Won	
ASCAP Latin Awards	2023	"Ley Seca" (with Anuel AA)	Winning Songs	Won	
ASCAP Latin Awards	2023	"Sensual Bebé"	Winning Songs	Won	
ASCAP Latin Awards	2023	"Tarot" (with Bad Bunny)	Winning Songs	Won	
Billboard Music Awards	2020	"No Me Conoce (Remix)" (with J Balvin & Bad Bunny)	Top Latin Song	Nominated	
Billboard Music Awards	2021	"Dakiti" (with Bad Bunny)	Top Latin Song	Won	
Billboard Latin Music Awards	2020	Himself	New Artist of the Year	Nominated	
Billboard Latin Music Awards	2021	Himself	Male Hot Latin Songs Artist of the Year	Nominated	
Billboard Latin Music Awards	2021	"Dakiti" (with Bad Bunny)	Vocal Event Hot Latin Song of the Year	Won	
Billboard Latin Music Awards	2021	"Dakiti" (with Bad Bunny)	Hot Latin Song of the Year	Won	
Billboard Latin Music Awards	2021	"Dakiti" (with Bad Bunny)	Airplay Song of the Year	Nominated	
Billboard Latin Music Awards	2021	"Dakiti" (with Bad Bunny)	Sales Song of the Year	Nominated	
Billboard Latin Music Awards	2021	"Dakiti" (with Bad Bunny)	Streaming Song of the Year	Won	
Billboard Latin Music Awards	2021	"Dakiti" (with Bad Bunny)	Latin Rhythm Song of the Year	Nominated	
Billboard Latin Music Awards	2022	Himself	Artist of the Year	Nominated	
Billboard Latin Music Awards	2022	Himself	Hot Latin Songs Artist of the Year, Male	Nominated	
Grammy Awards	2023	Un Verano Sin Ti	Album of the Year (Note: Tarot, with Bad Bunny)	Nominated	
Latin American Music Awards	2019	Himself	New Artist of the Year	Nominated	
Latin American Music Awards	2022	Himself	Artist of the Year	Nominated	
Latin American Music Awards	2022	Himself	Favorite Male Artist	Nominated	
Latin American Music Awards	2022	Himself	Favorite Urban Artist	Nominated	
Latin American Music Awards	2022	"Dakiti" (with Bad Bunny)	Song of the Year	Won	
Latin American Music Awards	2022	"Dakiti" (with Bad Bunny)	Favorite Urban Song	Won	
Latin American Music Awards	2022	"Fiel" (with Wisin)	Favorite Urban Song	Nominated	
Latin American Music Awards	2022	"Fiel" (with Wisin)	Collaboration of the Year	Nominated	
Latin American Music Awards	2022	"Fiel" (with Wisin)	Viral Song of the Year	Nominated	
Latin American Music Awards	2023	Himself	Favorite Urban Artist	Nominated	
Latin American Music Awards	2023	"Sensual Bebe"	Favorite Urban Song	Nominated	
Latin Grammy Awards	2020	"Medusa" (with Anuel AA & J Balvin)	Best Rap/Hip Hop Song	Nominated	
Latin Grammy Awards	2020	"Adicto" (as songwriter)	Best Urban Song	Nominated	
Latin Grammy Awards	2021	"Agua" (as songwriter)	Song of the Year	Nominated	
Latin Grammy Awards	2021	"Agua" (as songwriter)	Best Urban Song	Nominated	
Latin Grammy Awards	2021	"Dakiti" (with Bad Bunny)	Best Urban Song	Nominated	
Latin Grammy Awards	2022	Un Verano Sin Ti (as songwriter)	Album of the Year	Nominated	
iHeartRadio Music Awards	2021	"Dakiti" (with Bad Bunny)	Latin Pop/Reggaeton Song of the Year	Nominated	
