= Anuel AA: Bzrp Music Sessions, Vol. 46 =

2021 single by Bizarrap and Anuel AA

Single by Bizarrap and Anuel AA
- Language: Spanish
- Released: November 3, 2021
- Recorded: 2021
- Studio: Hit Factory Criteria, Miami, United States
- Genre: Latin trap
- Length: 3:21
- Label: Dale Play
- Songwriters: Emmanuel Gazmey; Gonzalo Julián Conde
- Producer: Bizarrap

Bizarrap singles chronology
| "Unfollow" (2021) | "Anuel AA: Bzrp Music Sessions, Vol. 46" (2021) | "Morad: Bzrp Music Sessions, Vol. 47" (2021) |

Anuel AA singles chronology
| "Dictadura" (2021) | "Anuel AA: Bzrp Music Sessions, Vol. 46" (2021) | "Leyenda" (2021) |

Music video
- "Anuel AA: Bzrp Music Sessions, Vol. 46" on YouTube

"Anuel AA: Bzrp Music Sessions, Vol. 46" is a song by Argentine record producer Bizarrap and Puerto Rican rapper and singer Anuel AA. It was released on November 3, 2021. This is the third Bzrp Music Sessions to feature an artist of Puerto Rican descent. Bizarrap collaborated previously with Eladio Carrion and Nicky Jam and Anuel AA is the second Puerto Rican artist to record with Bizarrap.

== Background ==
The session has been the subject of rumors since mid-July 2021. In August Anuel's manager Frabián Elí announced in an interview that Anuel and Biza are interested to work together.

At the beginning of October, Anuel uploaded photos on his Instagram in a studio, and then Bizarrap confirmed that he was in the same place, producing. On October 31, 2021, Bizarrap implicitly confirmed the exit of this session, as it does in the usual way: leaving subtle clues. First, he uploaded a deleted photo where there was a cap with the United States flag and next to it a double A battery pack, referring to the name of the Puerto Rican artist. Next, Bizarrap uploaded the most obvious clue: a photo with an Anuel merch hoodie that says "Real Hasta la Muerte".

The official confirmation was made the next day, November 1, 2021, through an Instagram post Bizarrap. Anuel also made the same post.

== Composition and lyric ==
In the mid-October Anuel posted an a cappella singing about the thug life on the street and being in the hood. A day before the release of the music session he posted a video with Bizarrap, writing: "Do you remember the chore that I posted singing (Asi es el caserio, asi es mi caserio)?".

After the release of the song he had some criticism about the lyrics of the song. Many people began to criticize Anuel AA for the lyrics of the song after there was a verse in the lyrics which says "Some of us are not dead, but we are not alive (Algunos no estamos muertos, pero no estamos vivos)", since many said that it was a meaningless phrase as well as the verse "She told me that she is a lesbian, then we do a threesome (Me dijo que ella es lesbiana, pues entonces hacemos un trío)".

== Music video ==
The music video for the song was directed by Pipes and reached 1 million views on YouTube in just 30 minutes of release. The music video for the song reached 10 million views on YouTube in one day.

== Personnel ==
Credits adapted from Genius.

- Bizarrap – producer, recording engineer
- Anuel AA – vocals
- Evlay – mixing
- Javier Fracchia – mastering
- EQ El Equalizer – recording engineer
- Nicolás Patiño – assistant engineer
- ElTiin14 – artwork

== Charts ==
Chart performance for "Anuel AA: Bzrp Music Sessions, Vol. 46"
| Chart (2021) | Peak position |
|---|---|
| Argentina Hot 100 (Billboard) | 7 |
| Global 200 (Billboard) | 122 |
| Spain (Promusicae) | 3 |
| US Hot Latin Songs (Billboard) | 38 |

== Certifications ==
Certifications for "Anuel AA: Bzrp Music Sessions, Vol. 46"
| Region | Certification | Certified units/sales |
|---|---|---|
| Spain (Promusicae) | Platinum | 60,000^{‡} |
^{‡} Sales+streaming figures based on certification alone.

== See also ==
- List of Billboard Argentina Hot 100 top-ten singles in 2021
