= Leyenda (song) =

2021 single by Anuel AA

Single by Anuel AA

from the album Las Leyendas Nunca Mueren
- Language: Spanish
- Released: November 11, 2021
- Genre: Latin trap
- Length: 3:40
- Label: Real Hasta la Muerte
- Songwriter: Emmanuel Gazmey Santiago
- Producers: FnZ; Foreign Teck; Chris Hojas

Anuel AA singles chronology
| "Anuel AA: Bzrp Music Sessions, Vol. 46" (2021) | "Leyenda" (2021) | "Súbelo" (2021) |

Music video
- "Leyenda" on YouTube

"Leyenda" is a song by Puerto Rican rapper Anuel AA. It was released through Real Hasta la Muerte on November 11, 2021 as the second single from the album Las Leyendas Nunca Mueren (2021). For this song in particular, Anuel AA was inspired by global sports legends including basketball stars Kobe Bryant and Michael Jordan.

== Background ==
In April, 2021, an 8-second preview of a song in which Anuel AA accented the word "leyenda" appeared on social media. In November, 2021, Anuel AA posted official preview for the song's music video. Later, he announced his third solo studio album Las Leyendas Nunca Mueren, and the song was included as the eight track.

== Composition ==
The song was written by Anuel AA and produced by FnZ, Foreign Teck and Chris Hojas. In an interview for El Guru in Apple Music, Anuel AA stated he is working hard and feels "like I'm just getting started". He also said his team is bigger and more powerful now and there are a lot of positive vibes. In "Leyenda", Anuel AA makes references to Bad Bunny's "Yo Perreo Sola" and Tego Calderon's "Guasa, Guasa". He also mentions fellow music artists including El Alfa, Rauw Alejandro and Rosalía.

== Commercial performance ==
"Leyenda" debuted and peaked at number 21 on the US Billboard Hot Latin Songs chart dated November 27, 2022. In Spain's official weekly chart, it debuted at number 51. The song would reach the 13th position on the Latin Digital Song Sales chart dated January 21, 2022. "Leyenda" also debuted and peaked at number 20 on the Latin Streaming Songs chart dated November 27, 2021.

== Music video ==
The music video for "Leyenda" was released on December 18, 2021. It was produced by Fernando Lugo and Anuel AA. It shows Anuel AA paying homage to basketball legends Kobe Bryant and Michael Jordan and recreating the moment when Bryant won one of his NBA championship titles.

== Charts ==
Chart performance for "Leyenda"
| Chart (2021) | Peak position |
|---|---|
| Spain (PROMUSICAE) | 51 |
| US Latin Rhythm Airplay (Billboard) | 23 |
| US Latin Digital Song Sales (Billboard) | 13 |
