= La Ocasión =

2016 single by DJ Luian and others

Single by DJ Luian, Mambo Kingz and De la Ghetto featuring Arcángel, Ozuna and Anuel AA
- Language: Spanish
- English title: "The Occasion"
- Published: February 10, 2016
- Genre: Latin trap; Latin R&B
- Label: Hear This Music
- Songwriters: Rafaell Castillo; Austin Santos; Juan Carlos Ozuna; Emmanuel Gazmey
- Producers: DJ Luian; Mambo Kingz

Music video
- "La Ocasión" on YouTube

"La Ocasión" (English: "The Occasion") is a song by Puerto Rican producer DJ Luian, Puerto Rican producer duo Mambo Kingz and American singer De la Ghetto featuring American singer Arcángel and Puerto Rican singers Ozuna and Anuel AA. It was released by Hear This Music on February 10, 2016.

== Charts ==
=== Weekly charts ===
Weekly chart performance for "La Ocasión"
Chart (2016)	Peak position
US Hot Latin Songs (Billboard)	21
US Latin Rhythm Airplay (Billboard)	23

=== Year-end charts ===
2016 year-end chart performance for "La Ocasión"
Chart (2016)	Position
US Hot Latin Songs (Billboard)	54

== Remix ==
A remix version was released on February 8, 2017 by DJ Luian and Mambo Kingz featuring Ozuna, De la Ghetto, Arcángel, Anuel AA, Daddy Yankee, Nicky Jam, Farruko, J Balvin, and Zion.

== Certifications ==
Certifications for "La Ocasión"
Region	Certification	Certified units/sales
Spain (Promusicae)	Platinum	60,000^{‡}
United States (RIAA)	18× Platinum (Latin)	1,080,000^{‡}
United States (RIAA) Remix	4× Platinum (Latin)	240,000^{‡}
^{‡} Sales+streaming figures based on certification alone.
