= Fiel (song) =

2021 song by Los Legendarios, Wisin and Jhayco

Single by Los Legendarios, Wisin and Jhayco

from the album Los Legendarios 001
- Language: Spanish
- Released: February 4, 2021
- Genre: Reggaeton
- Length: 4:21
- Label: WK; La Base
- Producers: Los Legendarios; Haze

Music video
- "Fiel" on YouTube

"Fiel" (English: "Faithful") is a song by Puerto Rican producer duo Los Legendarios and Puerto Rican singers Wisin and Jhayco. It was released by WK Records and La Base Music Group as the lead single from the album Los Legendarios 001 on February 4, 2021. The song peaked in top 10 on the charts of the United States and Spain. On June 15, 2021, a remixed version of the song with the participation of Puerto Rican singers Anuel AA and Myke Towers was released as single.

== Background ==
In an interview for Billboard magazine, the artists said the song came "organically" and was result of a hard work and good vibes. They were meant to create a classic reggaeton hit. Jhayco stated that he has been very happy to work with Wisin. Previously, he accepted Los Legendarios' invitation for a song on their album.

== Composition ==
Jhayco's verse in Fiel became viral on Tiktok and Los Legendarios said "it as was like a snowball — every day it kept growing": Tú 'tás dura sin ir al gym (You look good without going to the gym). In the song, Wisin and Jhayco name-drops several songs from fellow artists, such as Wisin & Yandel's "Noche de Sexo" (featuring Romeo Santos), "Llame Pa' Verte" and "Paleta" (featuring Daddy Yankee) and "Como Se Siente" by Jhayco himself.

== Commercial performance ==
In the United States, "Fiel" appeared at number 20 on the Bubbling Under Hot 100 chart on the issue dated April 24, 2024, before reaching its debut at number 93 on the Billboard Hot 100 with and would peak at number 62 in its 9th week. On the Hot Latin Songs chart, it debuted at number 42 and eventually peaked at number fifth on the chart dated May 22, 2021. It would also peak atop the Latin Airplay chart and the Latin Rhythm Airplay chart on the issue dated 12 June 2021. "Fiel" also peaked at number fourth the Latin Digital Song Sales chart, the Latin Pop Airplay chart and the Latin Streaming Songs chart.

"Fiel" debuted at number 119 on the Billboard Global 200 on the issue dated March 27, 2021. The song would reach the 13th position on the chart dated July 3, 2021. It also appeared on the Billboard Global Excl. US chart and would reach its peak on the chart at number eight on the issue dated April 24, 2021. On the song chart in Spain, it debuted at the 31st position, before reaching the 10th position in its sixth week on the chart. It has won the first place of the chart and was also certified quintuple-platinum in the country. "Fiel" was certified with 21 Platinum by RIAA.

"Fiel" reached at the top also in El Salvador, Guatemala and Honduras. The song also peaked at top 5 in Bolivia, Colombia, Costa Rica, Dominican Republic, Nicaragua, Panama, Peru and Puerto Rico. It also peaked at top 10 in Argentina, Ecuador and Paraguay.

== Charts ==
Chart performance for "Fiel"
Chart (2021)	Peak position
Argentina Hot 100 (Billboard)	8
Bolivia (Monitor Latino)	4
Colombia (Monitor Latino)	2
Costa Rica (Monitor Latino)	4
Dominican Republic (Monitor Latino)	4
Ecuador (Monitor Latino)	8
El Salvador (Monitor Latino)	1
Global 200 (Billboard)	13
Guatemala (Monitor Latino)	1
Honduras (Monitor Latino)	1
Italy (FIMI)	72
Nicaragua (Monitor Latino)	4
Panama (Monitor Latino)	2
Paraguay (Monitor Latino)	6
Peru (Monitor Latino)	2
Portugal (AFP)	94
Puerto Rico (Monitor Latino)	3
Spain (PROMUSICAE)	1
Switzerland (Schweizer Hitparade)	81
US Billboard Hot 100	62
US Hot Latin Songs (Billboard)	5
US Latin Airplay (Billboard)	1

== Certifications ==
Certifications and sales for "Fiel"
Region	Certification	Certified units/sales
Italy (FIMI)	Gold	35,000^{‡}
Mexico (AMPROFON)	Diamond	700,000^{‡}
Spain (PROMUSICAE)	5× Platinum	300,000^{‡}
United States (RIAA)	14× Platinum (Latin)	840,000^{‡}
^{‡} Sales+streaming figures based on certification alone.

== Remix ==
"Fiel (remix)"

Single by Wisin, Jhayco and Anuel AA featuring Los Legendarios and Myke Towers
- Language: Spanish
- Released: June 15, 2021
- Genre: Reggaeton
- Length: 5:49
- Label: WK Records; La Base Music Group
- Producers: Los Legendarios; Fino como el Haze

Anuel AA singles chronology
"Location" (2021)	"Fiel (remix)" (2021)	"Los De Siempre" (2021)

Myke Towers singles chronology
"Besame" (2021)	"Fiel (remix)" (2021)	"Rapido" (2021)

Music video
- "Fiel (remix)" on YouTube

On June 15, 2021, a remix of the song with Puerto Rican rappers Anuel AA and Myke Towers was released by WK Records and La Base Music group and was made available worldwide as a single. It was written by Wisin, Jhay Cortez, Anuel AA and Myke Towers alongside Puerto Rican producers Los Legendarios and Fino como el Haze, Nydia Laner, Orlando Jovani Cepeda Matos and Puerto Rican rapper and singer Mora. It was produced by Los Legendarios and Fino como el Haze. In Spain, the remix of "Fiel" debuted at number 59 on the chart dated June 18, 2021, and would reach its peak at number nine at its second week. It got an octuple-platinum certification by RIAA and a double-platinum certification in Spain.

=== Music video ===
The music video was released the same day the single was released and was directed by NAVS. It has reached 180 million views on YouTube.

=== Charts ===
Weekly chart performance for "Fiel (remix)"
Chart (2021)	Peak position
Spain (PROMUSICAE)	9

=== Certifications ===
Certifications and sales for "Fiel (remix)"
Region	Certification	Certified units/sales
Spain (PROMUSICAE)	2× Platinum	120,000^{‡}
United States (RIAA)	8× Platinum (Latin)	480,000^{‡}
^{‡} Sales+streaming figures based on certification alone.
