= Me Gusta (Shakira and Anuel AA song) =

2020 single by Shakira and Anuel AA

Single by Shakira and Anuel AA
- Language: Spanish
- English title: "I Like It"
- Released: 13 January 2020
- Studio: Criteria Studios (Miami, FL)
- Genre: Reggaeton; trap; dembow
- Length: 3:10
- Label: Sony Music Latin
- Songwriters: Carlos E. Ortiz Rivera; Daniel Echavarría Oviedo; Emmanuel Gazmey Santiago; Ian Lewis; Joan Antonio González Marrero; Shakira; Édgar Barrera
- Producers: Alex "A.C." Castillo; Shakira; Édgar Barrera "Edge"

Shakira singles chronology
"Tutu" (2019)	"Me Gusta" (2020)	"Girl Like Me" (2020)

Anuel AA singles chronology
"Aventura" (2019)	"Me Gusta" (2020)	"Medusa" (2020)

Music video
- "Me Gusta" on YouTube

"Me Gusta" (transl. "I Like It") is a song by Colombian singer-songwriter Shakira and Puerto Rican rapper Anuel AA. It was released on 13 January 2020, via Sony Music Latin. It samples Inner Circle's song "Sweat (A La La La La Long)" (1992). The song was initially released as the lead single of Shakira's at the time upcoming twelfth studio album, which was supposed to be released in 2020, but was ultimately scrapped due to the COVID-19 Pandemic in the same year.

== Background and promotion ==
Sony Music Latin CEO Afo Verde partnered Anuel AA with Shakira to grow his audience, after the rapper demanded "more services from [the label]". Shakira played a clip of the song in her home recording studio during a 60 Minutes interview with CBS in November 2019. On 12 January 2020, Shakira announced the collaboration posting the single cover alongside the song's release date on her Instagram. The singer is seen wearing a pink dress designed by Kuwaiti designer Yousef Al-Jasmi on the cover. The song marks Shakira's first single as a lead artist since 2018's "Nada". "Me Gusta" was promoted on huge billboards in Times Square. On January 22, 2020, Shakira shared a "Making of" video of the song on her social medias. To celebrate Shakira's upcoming Super Bowl Halftime Show performance, a special "Me Gusta"-themed pop-up store was put up in Miami. It featured colored walls and fancy furniture that resembled the song's music video setting. In the store on January 31 and February 1, among several items, fans could purchase an exclusive "Me Gusta" clothing line, that was later added on Shakira's official online store. On March 11, 2020, a "Me Gusta" official Instagram filter was sponsored by Shakira.

== Critical reception ==
Suzette Fernandez of Billboard described the song as "upbeat reggaeton trap" with lyrics focusing on Shakira and Anuel AA as a couple whose love is "losing the sparks". Suzy Exposito at Rolling Stone thought that the track "is an unhurried lover's rock number with a delicate touch of dembow" and pointed out the couples' complicated relationship "they're fully committed to reclaim". Idolator's Mike Nied called the song "another catchy and seriously danceable banger" within Shakira's catalogue.

Billboard included 'Me Gusta' in their '20 Best Latin Summer Songs of 2020' list.

== Commercial performance ==
The single broke the record for biggest first-week debut on Spotify by a lead female Spanish song with 9,290,165 streams, surpassing the record previously held by "Tusa".

In its first four tracking days, it debuted at number 20 on Billboard's Hot Latin Songs. The song grew on the chart the following week reaching number 6. The song became Shakira's 30th Top 10 hit on the chart extending her record as the female artist with most Top 10 entries on the chart.

"Me Gusta" also debuted in the Top 10 of multiple Latin American countries, reaching number one in Mexico and Ecuador, and reached the second spot in Spain.

The single was certified x2 Platinum in Spain, Platinum+Gold in Mexico and Gold in Italy.

"Me Gusta" was the most Shazammed Latin song in the first half of 2020, according to Shazam’s Mid-Year Chart.

== Music video ==
The official lyric video of the song was released on January 14, 2020. The official music video was filmed in Miami in January 2020 and was directed by Drew Kirsch. It premiered on YouTube on March 6, 2020, in a live premiere format.

The colorful visual pays homage to the Asian culture ] with different costumes, hairstyles, and the theme of sushi. Shakira & Anuel travel through the Sri Lankan hills on the popular "Kandy-Nuwara Eliya train ride", one of the most scenic train journeys in all of Asia. In other scenes Anuel prepares sushi, while Shakira lies on the kitchen table, wearing luxurious pink satin and feathers. Throughout the video Shakira changes hair colors multiple times. By the video’s end, both artists share a colorful feast.

=== Reception ===
According to Rolling Stone, the video "presents a colorful fantasy of cosmopolitan life".

The music video surpassed 100 million views on June 26, 2020, earning the Vevo Certified Award. It was Shakira's 40th music video to reach this milestone. Shakira became the artist with the highest number of Vevo Certified videos as lead artist, with a total of 35 videos, surpassing Taylor Swift’s previous number (34). Shakira joined Madonna as the only female artists to have at least four videos from four different decades to reach 100 million views. As of July 9, 2020, "Me Gusta" is the most viewed Latin video by a female artist released in 2020, according to Vevo.

== Accolades ==
Year	Ceremony	Award	Result	Ref
2020	Premios Juventud	OMG Collaboration	Nominated	
2020	Monitor Latino Music Awards	Colaboración del Año	Nominated	

== Credits and personnel ==
Credits adapted from Tidal.

- Shakira – vocals, production, songwriting
- Anuel AA – vocals, songwriting
- Alex "A.C." Castillo – production, programming
- Édgar Barrera "Edge" – production, songwriting, guitar, programming
- Carlos E. Ortiz Rivera – songwriting
- Daniel Echavarría Oviedo – songwriting
- Ian Lewis – songwriting (samples of "Sweat (A La La La La Long)")
- Joan Antonio González Marrero – songwriting
- Adam Ayan – master engineering
- Andros Rodriguez – mixing engineering, recording engineering
- Ervin Quiroz "EQ" – recording engineering
- Roger Rodés – recording engineering

== Charts ==
=== Weekly charts ===
Weekly chart performance for "Me Gusta"
Chart (2020)	Peak position
Argentina Hot 100 (Billboard)	18
Belgium (Ultratip Bubbling Under Flanders)	17
Bolivia (Monitor Latino)	3
Brazil (Top 100 Brasil)	73
Canadian Digital Songs Sales (Billboard)	32
Chile (Monitor Latino)	3
ERROR in "CIS": Invalid position: 380. Expected number 1–200 or dash (–).
Colombia (National-Report)	3
Costa Rica (Monitor Latino)	6
Croatia International Airplay (HRT)	21
Dominican Republic (SODINPRO)	5
Ecuador (National-Report)	1
El Salvador (Monitor Latino)	3
Finland Airplay (Radiosoittolista)	90
Guatemala (Monitor Latino)	7
Honduras (Monitor Latino)	7
Italy (FIMI)	62
Latin America (Monitor Latino)	3
Mexico (Monitor Latino)	1
Mexico (Billboard Mexican Airplay)	4
Netherlands (Dutch Tipparade 40)	16
Nicaragua (Monitor Latino)	9
Panama (Monitor Latino)	7
Paraguay (Monitor Latino)	6
Peru (Monitor Latino)	7
Poland Airplay (ZPAV)	13
Puerto Rico (Monitor Latino)	4
Romania (Airplay 100)	7
Slovenia (SloTop50)	49
Spain (PROMUSICAE)	2
Switzerland (Schweizer Hitparade)	42
Uruguay (Monitor Latino)	3
US Bubbling Under Hot 100 (Billboard)	16
US Hot Latin Songs (Billboard)	6
US Latin Airplay (Billboard)	4
US Latin Rhythm Airplay (Billboard)	4
Venezuela (Monitor Latino)	3

=== Year-end charts ===
2020 year-end chart performance for "Me Gusta"
Chart (2020)	Position
Argentina Airplay (Monitor Latino)	17
Poland (ZPAV)	99
Romania (Airplay 100)	35
Spain (PROMUSICAE)	23
US Hot Latin Songs (Billboard)	33

== Certifications ==
Certifications and sales for "Me Gusta"
Region	Certification	Certified units/sales
Brazil (Pro-Música Brasil)	2× Platinum	80,000^{‡}
Canada (Music Canada)	Platinum	80,000^{‡}
Colombia	Platinum+3× Gold	
Italy (FIMI)	Gold	35,000^{‡}
Mexico (AMPROFON)	4× Platinum+Gold	270,000^{‡}
Poland (ZPAV)	Gold	10,000^{‡}
Spain (Promusicae)	3× Platinum	180,000^{‡}
^{‡} Sales+streaming figures based on certification alone.
