= Está Cabrón Ser Yo =

2020 song by Bad Bunny featuring Anuel AA

Song by Bad Bunny featuring Anuel AA

from the album YHLQMDLG
- Language: Spanish
- Released: February 29, 2020
- Genre: Latin trap
- Length: 3:47
- Label: Rimas
- Songwriters: Benito Martínez; Emmanuel Gazmey; Frank Packer; Harald Sorebo
- Producers: Payday; Frank King

Visualizer
- "Está Cabrón Ser Yo" on YouTube

"Está Cabrón Ser Yo" (English: "It's Fucking Hard to Be Me") is a song by Puerto Rican rapper Bad Bunny featuring Puerto Rican rapper Anuel AA from his third studio album YHLQMDLG (2020). The song was written by Benito Martínez, Emmanuel Gazmey, Frank Packer and Harald Sorebo with Payday and Frank King handling the production.

== Promotion and release ==
On February 28, 2020, Bad Bunny announced his third studio album that was revealed to be YHLQMDLG during his performance and guest appearance on The Tonight Show Starring Jimmy Fallon, which was released the following day. Anuel AA was not included in the tracklist that Bad Bunny released on Instagram since this collaboration was planned as a surprise featuring.

== Commercial performance ==
Following the releasing of YHLQMDLG, "Está Cabrón Ser Yo" appeared on the US Billboard Hot 100 chart upon the issue date of March 14, 2020. The song also charted at number 13 on the US Hot Latin Songs chart upon the issue date of March 14, 2020. In Spain, it reached at number 15.

== Audio visualizer ==
A visualizer video for the song was uploaded to YouTube on February 29, 2020, along with the other visualizer videos of the songs that appeared on YHLQMDLG.

== Charts ==
Chart performance for "Está Cabrón Ser Yo"
Chart (2020)	Peak position
Spain (Promusicae)	15
US Billboard Hot 100	97
US Hot Latin Songs (Billboard)	13

== Certifications ==
Certifications for "Está Cabrón Ser Yo"
Region	Certification	Certified units/sales
Spain (Promusicae)	Platinum	60,000^{‡}
^{‡} Sales+streaming figures based on certification alone.
