= Kendo Kaponi =

Puerto Rican rapper

- Born: José Fernando Rivera Morales; August 19, 1984 (age 42); Bayamón, Puerto Rico
- Genres: Latin trap; reggaeton; hip-hop
- Occupations: Rapper; singer; songwriter; producer
- Years active: 2004–present
- Labels: Rimas; Real Hasta la Muerte; Sony Latin

José Fernando Rivera Morales (born August 19, 1984), known professionally as Kendo Kaponi, is a Puerto Rican rapper, songwriter and producer.

== Personal life ==
Kaponi was raised by his grandmother, as both of his parents were drug addicts who had died by the time he was seven years old. When he was nine, his grandmother also died and he lived in several foster homes.

He has been to jail several times with cases ranging from drug possession to assault.

He has two daughters and one son.

== Career ==
Kaponi began his career in the early 2000s writing songs for artists such as Héctor el Father, Cosculluela and Wisin & Yandel. He eventually became a sought-after songwriter, catching the attention of Don Omar who signed him to his label “El Orfanato”, where he started releasing his own music as well as songwriting for other artists signed to the label, mainly Farruko.

Kaponi has released one mixtape, El Alpha & El Omega in 2018. He is also known for participating in productions with Don Omar such as Don Omar Presents: Meet the Orphans, which include El Duro, Viviendo Con el Enemigo, and RX. He was also involved in a diss battle against Baby Rasta, Cosculluela and Arcángel.

As of 2025, he is signed to Rimas Entertainment where he works as a producer. He also writes songs for Anuel AA independently.

== Discography ==
=== Studio albums ===
- Apocalypto (2026)

=== Mixtape ===
- Musicologo & Menes: Kendo Edition (2016)
- El Alpha & El Omega (2018)

== Filmography ==
Year	Title	Character	Notes
2013	Reggaetón the Movie	Omar	First appearance in acting
