= McGregor (song) =

Song by Anuel AA

from the album Las Leyendas Nunca Mueren
- Language: Spanish
- Released: November 26, 2021
- Genre: Latin trap
- Length: 4:43
- Label: Real Hasta la Muerte
- Songwriter: Emmanuel Gazmey Santiago
- Producers: Foreign Teck; Todd Pritchard; Chris Hojas

Music video
- "McGregor" on YouTube

"McGregor" is a song by Puerto Rican rapper and singer Anuel AA, released as a track from the album Las Leyendas Nunca Mueren on November 26, 2021. The song debuted at number 58 in Spain and reached number 25 on the US Billboard Hot Latin Songs chart. A music video was released on March 4, 2022.

== Background ==
Two days before the release of the album Las Leyendas Nunca Mueren, Anuel AA uploaded the official preview of the sixth track, called McGregor.

== Composition ==
The song contains samples of "Drive Forever" performed by Sergio Valentino. Anuel AA mentions such artists as Daddy Yankee, Don Omar and even his ex-girlfriend Karol G. In the music video he censored Karol G's name.

== Music video ==
The music video of the song was released on March 4, 2022 and was directed by Fernando Lugo and Anuel AA. It was recorded in the Dominican Republic and shows fragments and recreates Conor McGregor's fights against José Aldo, Nate Diaz and Eddie Alvarez. In June the music video got removed due to copyright but it was recovered later.

== Charts ==
Chart (2021)	Peak position
Spain (PROMUSICAE)	58
US Hot Latin Songs (Billboard)	25

== Certifications ==
Certifications and sales for "McGregor"
Region	Certification	Certified units/sales
Spain (Promusicae)	Gold	30,000^{‡}
^{‡} Sales+streaming figures based on certification alone.
