= Brindemos =

Song by Anuel AA featuring Ozuna

from the album Real Hasta la Muerte
- Released: July 17, 2018
- Studio: The Hit Factory
- Genre: Latin trap
- Length: 3:08
- Songwriters: Emmanuel Gazmey Santiago; Carlos E. Ortiz Rivera; Juan Carlos Ozuna Rosado; Juan Rivera Vázquez; Vicente Saavedra; Jean Pierre Soto Pascual
- Producers: Chris Jedi; Gaby Music

Music video
- "Brindemos" on YouTube

"Brindemos" is a song by Puerto Rican rapper Anuel AA featuring Puerto Rican singer Ozuna, released as a track on the former's album Real Hasta la Muerte on July 17, 2018. A music video was released on August 3, 2018, the first music video that Anuel AA released after coming out of prison.

== Music video ==
The video of "Brindemos" was released in August with the song in Anuel AA's YouTube channel. As of April 2019, the music video overall has over 170 million views on YouTube. This is the first video that Anuel AA releases after being released from prison.

== Charts ==
=== Weekly charts ===
Chart (2018–19)	Peak position
Spain (Promusicae)	67
US Hot Latin Songs (Billboard)	16

=== Year-end charts ===
Chart (2018)	Position
US Hot Latin Songs (Billboard)	72

== Certifications ==
Region	Certification	Certified units/sales
Spain (Promusicae)	Platinum	60,000^{‡}
United States (RIAA)	7× Platinum (Latin)	420,000^{‡}
^{‡} Sales+streaming figures based on certification alone.
