= Adicto (Tainy, Anuel AA and Ozuna song) =

2019 single by Tainy, Anuel AA and Ozuna

Single by Tainy, Anuel AA and Ozuna
- Language: Spanish
- Released: August 22, 2019
- Genre: Reggaeton
- Length: 4:31
- Label: Neon16; Interscope
- Songwriter: Tainy • Anuel AA • Jhayco • Ozuna
- Producer: Tainy

Anuel AA singles chronology
| "Otro Trago (Remix)" (2019) | "Adicto" (2019) | "Yes" (2019) |

Ozuna singles chronology
| "Yo x Ti, Tu x Mi" (2019) | "Adicto" (2019) | "Si Te Vas" (2019) |

Music video
- "Adicto" on YouTube

"Adicto" is a song by Puerto Rican musicians Tainy, Anuel AA and Ozuna, released through Neon16 and Interscope Records on August 22, 2019.

Tainy's first song as lead producer, "Adicto" peaked at number 86 on the US Billboard Hot 100 and received a platinum certification in Spain. The music video for the song has reached 1 billion views on YouTube as of December 2022.

== Charts ==
=== Weekly charts ===
| Chart (2019) | Peak position |
|---|---|
| Argentina (Argentina Hot 100 | 5 |
| Colombia (National-Report) | 10 |
| Colombia Airplay (Monitor Latino) | 5 |
| Paraguay (SGP) | 7 |
| Spain (Promusicae) | 3 |
| Switzerland (Schweizer Hitparade) | 96 |
| US Billboard Hot 100 | 86 |
| US Hot Latin Songs (Billboard) | 5 |
| US Latin Airplay (Billboard) | 25 |
| US Latin Rhythm Airplay (Billboard) | 13 |

=== Year-end charts ===
| Chart (2019) | Position |
|---|---|
| Spain (PROMUSICAE) | 36 |
| US Hot Latin Songs (Billboard) | 35 |
| Chart (2020) | Position |
| US Hot Latin Songs (Billboard) | 32 |

== Certifications ==
| Region | Certification | Certified units/sales |
|---|---|---|
| Brazil (Pro-Música Brasil) | Platinum | 40,000^{‡} |
| Italy (FIMI) | Gold | 35,000^{‡} |
| Portugal (AFP) | Gold | 5,000^{‡} |
| Spain (Promusicae) | 4× Platinum | 240,000^{‡} |
| United States (RIAA) | Platinum | 1,000,000^{‡} |
Streaming
| Chile (Profovi) | Diamond | 45,000,000 |
^{‡} Sales+streaming figures based on certification alone.

== See also ==
- List of Billboard Argentina Hot 100 top-ten singles in 2019
