= Las Leyendas Nunca Mueren =

2021 studio album by Anuel AA

Studio album by Anuel AA
- Released: November 26, 2021
- Recorded: 2020–2021
- Genre: Latin trap; reggaeton; Latin hip hop
- Length: 67:13
- Language: Spanish
- Label: Real Hasta la Muerte; Sony Latin
- Producer: Foreign Teck; Tainy; Misael de la Cruz; Mvsis; Ovy on the Drums; Súbelo NEO; Mora; Cromo X; Machael; FnZ; Chris Hojas

Anuel AA chronology
Los Dioses (2021)	Las Leyendas Nunca Mueren (2021)	LLNM2 (2022)

Singles from Las Leyendas Nunca Mueren
- 1. "Dictadura" Released: October 28, 2021; 2. "Leyenda" Released: November 11, 2021; 3. "Súbelo" Released: November 18, 2021

Professional ratings
Review scores
Source	Rating
Allmusic	3.5/5 stars
Rolling Stone	4/5 stars

Las Leyendas Nunca Mueren (English: "The Legends Never Die") is the third solo studio album by Puerto Rican rapper Anuel AA. It was released on November 26, 2021, through Real Hasta la Muerte and Sony Music Latin. The album follows his second studio album Emmanuel (2020), and his collaboration album with Ozuna, Los Dioses (2021).

The album features collaborations with Eladio Carrión, Mora, Myke Towers and Jhayco.

== Background ==
In August 2020, Anuel AA uploaded a preview of a song, called "300" and wrote: "I will make an album for the trap, should I?". Anuel AA announced his upcoming album in May 2021 in an Instagram live. His manager Frabián Elí confirmed that the album would be released in July and will include trap and only two reggaeton songs. Later he announced via Instagram that the album had been delayed.

The title was revealed in August 2021 when Anuel uploaded an Instagram post with the name of his next album. The photo was from the official video of the song "23 Preguntas". In September 2021, Anuel uploaded a freestyle preview on Instagram, claiming that the album was finished. The unreleased track samples "Ready or Not" by the Fugees.

On November 18, 2021, Anuel AA announced the track listing for the album via the final basketball game between Capitanes de Arecibo and Mets de Guaynabo. The names and numbers of the tracks were on the warm-up shirts of the Capitanes team.

== Singles ==
Anuel AA released the first two singles of the album, "Dictadura" on October 28, 2021 and "Leyenda" on November 12, 2021. Puerto Rican rappers Myke Towers and Jhayco featured on the third and final single of the album, "Súbelo", released on November 18, 2021.

== Track listing ==
Las Leyendas Nunca Mueren track listing
No.	Title	Writer(s)	Producer(s)	Length
1.	"Real Hasta la Muerte"	Emmanuel Gazmey Santiago	Foreign Teck; Coleman	10:01
2.	"North Carolina" (with Eladio Carrión)	Gazmey; Eladio Carrión	Andre the Giant	2:56
3.	"Rick Flair"	Gazmey	Misael de la Cruz; Mvsis; Nely el Arma Secreta; EQ el Equalizer	2:58
4.	"1942"	Gazmey	Hide Miyabi; Kabeh; JBento	3:56
5.	"Pin"	Gazmey	Dimelo Ninow	3:41
6.	"McGregor"	Gazmey	Todd Pritchard; Foreign Teck; Chris Hojas	4:43
7.	"Llorando en un Ferrari"	Americo Garcia; Benjamin Lasnier; Emmanuel Gazmey; Ervin Quiroz; Gabriel Mora; Jorge Medina; Juan Jose Botero; Machael Angelo Cole; Max Borghetti; Patrick Ingunza; BEAM (rapper)	Machael; Urbøi; Boombox Cartel; Max Borghetti; Dim Crux	3:13
8.	"Leyenda"	Gazmey	Foreign Teck; Chris Hojas; FBN	3:40
9.	"Esa Cruz"	Gazmey	Tainy; Misael de la Cruz; Mvsis	2:44
10.	"300"	Gazmey	Misael de la Cruz; Mvsis	3:42
11.	"Exit"	Gazmey	Foreign Teck; Wain; Bass Charity; SAMUDAI	3:55
12.	"Una Palabra"	Gazmey; Carlos Varela	Ovy on the Drums; Tainy; Mvsis; Nely el Arma Secreta; Misael de la Cruz	6:09
13.	"Dictadura"	Gazmey; Gabriel Mora; Freddy Montalvo; Jose Carlos Cruz; Machael; Martin Rodriguez Vicente	Súbelo NEO; Mora; Cromo X; Machael	3:28
14.	"Mi Voz Cuesta un Billón" (with Mora)	Gazmey; Mora	Joseph Michael; Nathan Butts; Tyree Hawkins; Dim Crux	3:48
15.	"Súbelo" (with Myke Towers and Jhayco)	Gazmey; Jesús Manuel Nieves Cortez; Michael Anthony Torres Monge; Daniel Echavarría Oviedo	Ovy on the Drums	3:59
16.	"Última Canción"	Gazmey; Michael Hernandez; Ervin Quiroz; Tyree Hawkins; Crux	Foreign Teck; Nathan Butts; Tyree Hawkins; EQ el Equalizer; Dim Crux	4:20
Total length:				67:13

Notes

- "Real Hasta la Muerte" contains samples of "Hello Zepp" and "Zepp Overture" performed by Charlie Clouser
- "McGregor" contains samples of "Drive Forever" performed by Sergio Valentino
- "Última Canción" contains samples of "Ready or Not" performed by the Fugees and "Boadicea" performed by Enya

== Charts ==
=== Weekly charts ===
Weekly chart performance for Las Leyendas Nunca Mueren
Chart (2021)	Peak position
Spanish Albums (Promusicae)	5
Swiss Albums (Schweizer Hitparade)	96
US Billboard 200	30
US Top Latin Albums (Billboard)	1
US Latin Rhythm Albums (Billboard)	1
US Independent Albums (Billboard)	3

=== Year-end charts ===
2022 year-end chart performance for Las Leyendas Nunca Mueren
Chart (2022)	Position
Spanish Albums (PROMUSICAE)	52
US Independent Albums (Billboard)	47
US Top Latin Albums (Billboard)	12

2023 year-end chart performance for Las Leyendas Nunca Mueren
Chart (2023)	Position
Spanish Albums (PROMUSICAE)	95

== Certifications ==
Certifications for Las Leyendas Nunca Mueren
Region	Certification	Certified units/sales
Spain (Promusicae)	Gold	20,000^{‡}
United States (RIAA)	4× Platinum (Latin)	240,000^{‡}
^{‡} Sales+streaming figures based on certification alone.

== See also ==
- 2021 in Latin music
- List of number-one Billboard Latin Rhythm Albums of 2021
- List of number-one Billboard Latin Albums from the 2020s
