= Real Hasta la Muerte (record label) =

Puerto Rican record label

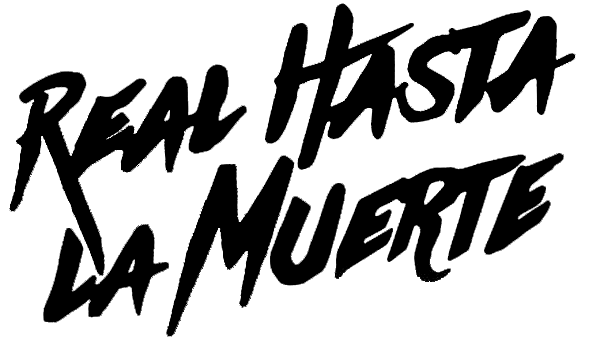
- Founded: May 9, 2017; 8 years ago
- Founder: Anuel AA
- Distributor: The Orchard
- Genre: Latin trap; reggaeton; hip hop
- Country of origin: Puerto Rico
- Location: Puerto Rico; Florida

Real Hasta la Muerte (RHLM; Spanish for "Real Until Death") is a Puerto Rican record label founded by Anuel AA in 2017, it has one headquarters located in Puerto Rico and two in Florida. Releases by artists signed to the label are distributed by The Orchard.

The label's current acts include rappers Anuel AA and Kendo Kaponi. The label has had four projects: Real Hasta la Muerte, Emmanuel, Los Dioses, Las Leyendas Nunca Mueren and LLNM2.

== History ==
=== 2017–2019 ===
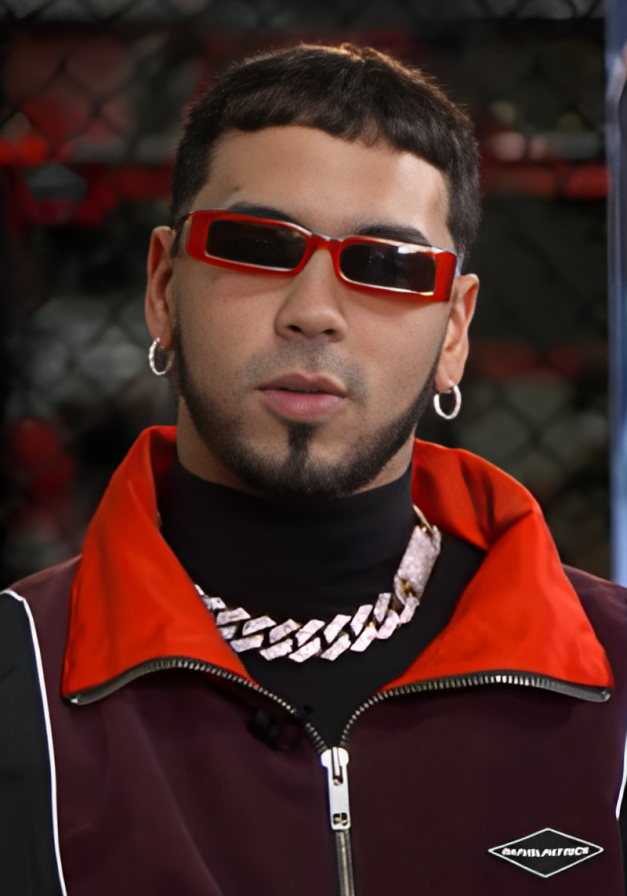
Anuel AA, founder of Real Hasta la Muerte

Real Hasta la Muerte was founded in 2017 by Anuel AA, a year before releasing his debut album Real Hasta la Muerte, this happened while he was in prison.

Anuel's Real Hasta la Muerte (2018) was the label's first album release, leading both the artist and label to tremendous success, debuting at number fifty-one on the Billboard 200.

On April 24, 2019, Anuel signs a contract with The Orchard for them to distribute the music of all the members of Real Hasta la Muerte.

I am super excited to work with The Orchard to share my new music with the world, as an independent artist, this is a great step forward.

— Anuel AA, The Orchard

=== 2020–present ===
In 2020 Kendo Kaponi is released from prison, signs for the label and releases his song "Resistencia". In May 2020, Anuel releases his second studio album, Emmanuel, debuting at number eight on the Billboard 200. On November 19, 2020, Anuel released his song "Me Contagié 2" on his Instagram account, announcing his retirement from music, but in January 2021 he returned to music, releasing his third studio album Los Dioses with Ozuna, debuting at number ten on the Billboard 200. In November 2021, Anuel releases his four studio album, Las Leyendas Nunca Mueren, debuting at number thirty on the Billboard 200.

On August 20, 2022, Frabián Elí was removed from his position as president of the label and files a lawsuit against Anuel AA for breach of contract. On August 22, 2022, José Gazmey becomes the new president of the label.

In December 2022, Anuel releases his fifth studio album LLNM2, debuting at number thirty on the Billboard 200.

== Artists ==
=== Current acts ===
Act	Year signed	Releases under the label
Anuel AA	Founder	5
Kendo Kaponi	2020	–

== Presidents ==
Name	Years	Reference
Frabián Elí	2017–2022	
José Gazmey	2022–present	

== Discography ==
Real Hasta la Muerte has officially released fifth studio albums.

=== Studio albums ===
Artist	Album	Details
Anuel AA	Real Hasta la Muerte	Released: July 17, 2018; Chart position: #42 U.S.; RIAA certification: Multi-Platinum
Anuel AA	Emmanuel (released with Sony Latin)	Released: May 29, 2020; Chart position: #8 U.S.; RIAA certification: Multi-Platinum
Anuel AA and Ozuna	Los Dioses (released with Aura Music and Sony Latin)	Released: January 22, 2021; Chart position: #10 U.S.; RIAA certification: —
Anuel AA	Las Leyendas Nunca Mueren (released with Sony Latin)	Released: November 26, 2021; Chart position: #30 U.S.; RIAA certification: —
Anuel AA	LLNM2 (released with Sony Latin)	Released: December 9, 2022; Chart position: #30 U.S.; RIAA certification: —
