= Ozuna discography =

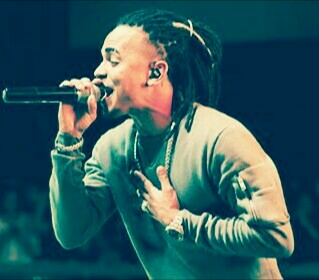
- Studio albums: 6
- EPs: 1
- Singles: 146
- Collaborative albums: 2

Puerto Rican singer Ozuna has released six studio albums, two collaborative studio albums, one extended plays (EPs), and 146 singles (including 24 as a featured artist).

== Albums ==
=== Solo studio albums ===
List of studio albums, with selected details, chart positions, and certifications
| Title | Album details | Peak chart positions | | | | | | | | | | Sales | Certifications |
| Title | Album details | US | US Latin | BEL (FL) | BEL (WA) | CAN | FRA | ITA | NL | SPA | SWI | Sales | Certifications |
|---|---|---|---|---|---|---|---|---|---|---|---|---|---|
| Odisea | Released: August 25, 2017; Label: VP, Dímelo Vi, Sony Latin; Format: CD, digital download, streaming | 22 | 1 | — | — | — | — | 31 | 156 | 38 | — | US: 18,000 | RIAA: 28× Platinum (Latin); FIMI: Platinum; PROMUSICAE: Gold |
| Aura | Released: August 24, 2018; Label: VP, Dímelo Vi, Sony Latin; Format: CD, digital download, streaming | 7 | 1 | 128 | 115 | 25 | 83 | 9 | 39 | 44 | 10 | US: 49,000 | RIAA: 23× Platinum (Latin); FIMI: Platinum; PROMUSICAE: Gold |
| Nibiru | Released: November 29, 2019; Label: Aura, Sony Latin; Format: CD, digital download, streaming | 41 | 1 | — | — | — | — | 60 | — | 17 | 50 | US: 17,000 | RIAA: 5× Platinum (Latin) |
| ENOC | Released: September 4, 2020; Label: Aura, Sony Latin; Format: CD, digital download, streaming | 17 | 1 | — | — | 80 | 172 | 16 | 75 | 1 | 23 | US: 21,000 | RIAA: 7× Platinum (Latin); FIMI: Gold; PROMUSICAE: Platinum |
| Ozutochi | Released: October 7, 2022; Label: Aura, Sony Latin; Format: CD, digital download, streaming | 161 | 5 | — | — | — | — | — | — | 7 | — | | |
| Cosmo | Released: November 17, 2023; Label: Aura, Sony Latin; Format: CD, digital download, streaming | 116 | 9 | — | — | — | — | — | — | 7 | — | | |
"—" denotes a single that did not chart or was not released in that territory.

=== Collaborative studio albums ===
List of studio albums, with selected details, chart positions, and certifications
| Title | Details | Peak chart positions | | | | | Certifications |
| Title | Details | US | US Latin | ITA | SPA | SWI | Certifications |
|---|---|---|---|---|---|---|---|
| Los Dioses (with Anuel AA) | Released: January 22, 2021; Label: Real Hasta la Muerte, Aura, Sony Latin; Format: CD, digital download, streaming | 10 | 1 | 46 | 1 | 17 | PROMUSICAE: Gold |
| Stendhal (with Beéle) | Released: December 5, 2025; Label: Sony Music, Nibiru; Format: CD, digital download, streaming | — | — | — | 16 | — | |

== Extended plays ==
| Title | Details |
|---|---|
| Afro | Released: May 26, 2023; Label: Aura, Sony Latin; Formats: digital download, streaming |

== Singles ==
=== As lead artist ===
List of singles released as lead artist, showing selected chart positions, certifications, and associated albums
| Title | Year | Peaks | | | | | | | | | | Certifications | Album |
| Title | Year | US | US Latin | US Latin Rhy. | ARG | CAN | FRA | ITA | NL | SPA | SWI | Certifications | Album |
|---|---|---|---|---|---|---|---|---|---|---|---|---|---|
| "Si No Te Quiere" (solo or remix featuring D.OZi or Arcángel and Farruko) | 2014 | — | 19 | 7 | — | — | — | — | — | — | — | PROMUSICAE: Gold | Odisea |
| "Si Te Dejas Llevar" (featuring Juanka El Problematik) | 2015 | — | — | — | — | — | — | — | — | — | — | RIAA: Platinum (Latin) | Non-album single |
| "No Quiere Enamorarse" (solo or remix featuring Daddy Yankee) | 2015 | — | 35 | — | — | — | — | — | — | — | — | PROMUSICAE: Gold (Remix) | Odisea |
| "Me Reclama" (with Luigi 21 Plus) | 2016 | — | — | — | — | — | — | — | — | — | — | PROMUSICAE: Gold | Non-album singles |
| "Te Vas" | 2016 | — | 31 | 14 | — | — | — | — | — | — | — | | Non-album singles |
| "Dile Que Tú Me Quieres" (solo or remix featuring Yandel) | 2016 | — | 8 | 6 | — | — | — | — | — | 33 | — | RIAA: 12× Platinum (Latin); FIMI: Gold; PROMUSICAE: Platinum | Odisea |
| "Diles" (Remix) (with Bad Bunny and Farruko, featuring Arcángel, Ñengo Flow, DJ Luian and Mambo Kingz) | 2016 | — | — | — | — | — | — | — | — | 85 | — | RIAA: 4× Platinum (Latin); PROMUSICAE: Gold; PROMUSICAE: 3× Platinum (Remix) | Non-album singles |
| "Me Ama Me Odia" (with Arcángel, Cosculluela and Brytiago) | 2016 | — | — | — | — | — | — | — | — | — | — | RIAA: 4× Platinum (Latin); PROMUSICAE: Gold | Non-album singles |
| "Hello" (with Karol G) | 2016 | — | 39 | 12 | — | — | — | — | — | — | — | | Unstoppable |
| "Simple" (with DJ Luian and Mambo Kingz featuring Cosculluela, Ñengo Flow and Baby Rasta y Gringo) | 2017 | — | — | — | — | — | — | — | — | — | — | RIAA: 2× Platinum (Latin) | Non-album singles |
| "Ahora Dice" (with Chris Jedi and J Balvin featuring Arcángel) | 2017 | — (Note: "Ahora Dice" did not enter the Billboard Hot 100, but peaked at number five on the Bubbling Under Hot 100 chart.) | 7 | 12 | — | — | — | — | — | 7 | — | FIMI: Gold; PROMUSICAE: 4× Platinum | Non-album singles |
| "Tu Foto" | 2017 | — (Note: "Tu Foto" did not enter the Billboard Hot 100, but peaked at number 10 on the Bubbling Under Hot 100 chart.) | 8 | 5 | — | — | — | — | — | 16 | — | RIAA: 11× Platinum (Latin); FIMI: Gold; PROMUSICAE: 2× Platinum | Odisea |
| "Bebé" (featuring Anuel AA) | 2017 | — | 28 | — | — | — | — | — | — | 66 | — | PROMUSICAE: Gold | Odisea |
| "El Farsante" (solo or remix with Romeo Santos) | 2017 | 49 | 2 | 6 | — | — | — | — | — | 22 | — | FIMI: Platinum; PROMUSICAE: 5× Platinum | Odisea |
| "Que Va" (with Alex Sensation) | 2017 | — | 17 | 9 | — | — | — | — | — | — | — | FIMI: Gold; PROMUSICAE: 2× Platinum | Non-album single |
| "Se Preparó" | 2017 | — | 16 | 8 | — | — | — | — | — | 3 | — | RIAA: 21× Platinum (Latin); FIMI: Platinum; PROMUSICAE: 5× Platinum | Odisea |
| "Criminal" (with Natti Natasha) | 2017 | 95 | 5 | 10 | — | — | — | 69 | — | 1 | 91 | RIAA: 15× Platinum (Latin); FIMI: 2× Platinum; PROMUSICAE: 5× Platinum; SNEP: Gold | Non-album single |
| "Síguelo Bailando" | 2017 | — | 16 | — | — | — | — | 71 | — | 8 | — | RIAA: 13× Platinum (Latin); FIMI: Platinum; PROMUSICAE: 3× Platinum | Odisea |
| "La Fórmula" (with De La Ghetto, Daddy Yankee featuring Chris Jedi) | 2017 | — | 23 | 14 | — | — | — | — | — | — | — | RIAA: 3× Platinum (Latin); PROMUSICAE: Gold | Mi Movimiento |
| "El Desorden" (with Daddy Yankee and Plan B) | 2017 | — | — | — | — | — | — | — | — | — | — | PROMUSICAE: Gold | Non-album single |
| "La Modelo" (with Cardi B) | 2017 | 52 | 3 | 1 | — | 84 | — | — | — | 50 | — | PROMUSICAE: Platinum | Aura |
| "Solita" (with Mambo Kingz and DJ Luian featuring Bad Bunny, Wisin and Almighty) | 2018 | — | 17 | — | — | — | — | — | — | — | — | RIAA: 38× Platinum (Latin); FIMI: Gold; PROMUSICAE: 2× Platinum | Non-album singles |
| "Bipolar" (with Chris Jedi and Brytiago) | 2018 | — | 20 | — | 88 | — | — | — | — | — | — | PROMUSICAE: Platinum | Non-album singles |
| "Balenciaga" (with Ele A el Dominio) | 2018 | — | 37 | — | — | — | — | — | — | 67 | — | PROMUSICAE: Gold | Non-album singles |
| "Única" (solo or remix featuring Anuel AA and Wisin & Yandel) | 2018 | 72 | 3 | 1 | 42 | — | — | — | — | 57 | — | FIMI: Gold; PROMUSICAE: Platinum | Aura |
| "Pa Mí" (with Tory Lanez) | 2018 | — | — | — | — | — | — | — | — | — | — | RIAA: Gold (Latin) | Non-album single |
| "Casualidad" (with Nacho) | 2018 | — | — | 24 | — | — | — | — | — | 67 | — | | La Criatura |
| "Vaina Loca" (featuring Manuel Turizo) | 2018 | 94 | 5 | 1 | 6 | — | — | 38 | — | 1 | 63 | FIMI: Platinum; PROMUSICAE: 5× Platinum | Aura |
| "El Anillo" (Remix) (with Jennifer Lopez) | 2018 | — | — | — | 58 | — | — | — | — | 41 | — | | Non-album single |
| "Me Dijeron" | 2018 | — | 11 | 19 | — | — | — | — | — | 30 | 95 | PROMUSICAE: Platinum | Aura |
| "Coméntale" (featuring Akon) | 2018 | — | 44 | — | — | — | — | — | — | — | — | PROMUSICAE: Gold | Aura |
| "Devuélveme" | 2018 | — | 21 | — | 75 | — | — | — | — | 45 | — | FIMI: Gold; PROMUSICAE: Platinum | Aura |
| "Luz Apaga" (with Lunay, Rauw Alejandro and Lyanno) | 2018 | — | — | 24 | 63 | — | — | — | — | 50 | — | PROMUSICAE: Platinum | Non-album singles |
| "Karma" (with Sky and J Balvin) | 2018 | — | — | — | — | — | — | — | — | — | — | RIAA: Platinum (Latin) | Non-album singles |
| "Confía (Remix)" (with Juhn) | 2018 | — | — | — | — | — | — | — | — | — | — | RIAA: Gold (Latin) | M.U.S.A |
| "Quiero Más" (featuring Wisin & Yandel) | 2018 | — | 20 | — | — | — | — | — | — | 100 | — | | Aura |
| "Imposible" (with Luis Fonsi) | 2018 | — (Note: "Imposible" did not enter the Billboard Hot 100, but peaked at number ten on the Bubbling Under Hot 100 chart.) | 9 | 1 | 8 | — | — | — | — | 4 | 17 | FIMI: Gold; PROMUSICAE: 3× Platinum | Vida |
| "Llegó la Navidad" (with Generación Escogida featuring Christian Nieves) | 2018 | — | — | — | — | — | — | — | — | — | — | | Non-album single |
| "Baila, Baila, Baila" (solo or remix featuring Ala Jaza or Daddy Yankee, J Balvin, Farruko and Anuel AA) | 2019 | 69 | 3 | 1 | 19 | — | 19 | 10 | — | 2 | 14 | RIAA: Platinum; FIMI: 3× Platinum; PROMUSICAE: 5× Platinum; PROMUSICAE: Platinum (Remix); SNEP: Gold | Nibiru |
| "Cama Vacía" | 2019 | — | — | — | — | — | — | — | — | 75 | — | | Non-album single |
| "Esclavo de Tus Besos" (with Manuel Turizo) | 2019 | — | — | 18 | 67 | — | — | — | — | 14 | — | RIAA: Platinum (Latin); PROMUSICAE: Platinum | ADN |
| "Vacía Sin Mí" (featuring Darell) | 2019 | — | — | — | — | — | — | — | — | 40 | — | | Non-album single |
| "Te Robaré" (with Nicky Jam) | 2019 | 91 | 6 | 1 | 7 | — | — | 28 | — | 7 | 28 | FIMI: Platinum; PROMUSICAE: 3× Platinum; SNEP: Gold | Íntimo |
| "Amor Genuino" | 2019 | 92 | 8 | — | — | — | — | — | — | 31 | — | PROMUSICAE: Gold | Nibiru |
| "Te Soñé de Nuevo" | 2019 | — | 16 | 1 | 39 | — | — | 87 | — | 18 | — | PROMUSICAE: Platinum | Nibiru |
| "Cambio" (with Anuel AA) | 2019 | — | 27 | — | — | — | — | — | — | 25 | — | PROMUSICAE: Gold | Non-album singles |
| "Muito Calor" (with Anitta) | 2019 | — | — | — | — | — | — | — | — | 60 | 80 | | Non-album singles |
| "Otro Trago" (Remix) (with Sech and Anuel AA featuring Darell and Nicky Jam) | 2019 | 34 | 1 | 1 | 1 | — | — | — | — | 2 | — | PROMUSICAE: 3× Platinum | Non-album singles |
| "Yo x Ti, Tú x Mí" (with Rosalía) | 2019 | — (Note: "Yo x Ti, Tu x Mi" did not enter the Billboard Hot 100, but peaked at number 17 on the Bubbling Under Hot 100 chart.) | 13 | 1 | 12 | — | 189 | 82 | — | 1 | 29 | RIAA: Platinum; FIMI: Gold; PROMUSICAE: 5× Platinum | Non-album singles |
| "Adicto" (with Tainy and Anuel AA) | 2019 | 86 | 9 | 13 | 5 | — | — | — | — | 3 | 87 | RIAA: Platinum; FIMI: Gold; PROMUSICAE: 4× Platinum | Non-album singles |
| "Si Te Vas" (with Sech) | 2019 | — | 20 | 19 | 15 | — | — | — | — | 8 | — | RIAA: 11× Platinum (Latin); PROMUSICAE: Platinum | Non-album singles |
| "Nadie" (Remix) (with Farruko and Lunay featuring Sech and Sharo Towers) | 2019 | — | — | — | — | — | — | — | — | — | — | | Non-album singles |
| "Aventura" (with Lunay and Anuel AA) | 2019 | — (Note: "Aventura" did not enter the Billboard Hot 100, but peaked at number 20 on the Bubbling Under Hot 100 chart.) | 11 | 1 | 16 | — | — | — | — | 5 | — | PROMUSICAE: 2× Platinum | Épico |
| "Hasta Que Salga el Sol" | 2019 | — | — | 1 | 64 | — | — | — | — | 20 | — | PROMUSICAE: Platinum | Nibiru |
| "Easy" (Remix) (with Jhay Cortez) | 2019 | — | — | 20 | — | — | — | — | — | — | — | | Non-album single |
| "Fantasía" | 2019 | — | 14 | 1 | — | — | — | — | — | 13 | — | PROMUSICAE: Gold | Nibiru |
| "Loco Contigo" (Remix) (with DJ Snake and J Balvin featuring Darell, Sech, Natti Natasha and Nicky Jam) | 2019 | — | — | — | — | — | — | — | — | — | — | | Non-album singles |
| "100 Preguntas" | 2020 | — | — | — | — | — | — | — | — | 76 | — | | Non-album singles |
| "La Cama" (Remix) (with Lunay and Myke Towers featuring Chencho Corleone and Rauw Alejandro) | 2020 | — | — | — | — | — | — | — | — | 16 | — | PROMUSICAE: Platinum | Non-album singles |
| "Mamacita" (with Black Eyed Peas and J. Rey Soul) | 2020 | 62 | 1 | 1 | 76 | 11 | 7 | 2 | 6 | 29 | 7 | RIAA: Platinum; FIMI: 3× Platinum; PROMUSICAE: Platinum; SNEP: Platinum | Translation |
| "Caramelo" (solo or remix featuring Karol G and Myke Towers) | 2020 | 76 | 3 | 1 | 3 | — | — | 17 | — | 1 | 42 | FIMI: 2× Platinum; PROMUSICAE: 4× Platinum; PROMUSICAE: 2× Platinum (Remix) | ENOC |
| "Mi Niña" | 2020 | — | — | — | — | — | — | — | — | — | — | | Non-album singles |
| "A Correr Los Lakers" (Remix) (with El Alfa and Nicky Jam featuring Arcángel and Secreto "El Famoso Biberón") | 2020 | — | — | — | — | — | — | — | — | — | — | PROMUSICAE: Gold | Non-album singles |
| "Gistro Amarillo" (with Wisin) | 2020 | — | 28 | 1 | — | — | — | — | — | — | — | | ENOC |
| "Drogba (Joanna)" (Global Latin Version) (with Afro B) | 2020 | — | — | 19 | — | — | — | — | — | — | — | | Non-album single |
| "Enemigos Ocultos" (with Wisin and Myke Towers featuring Arcángel, Juanka and Cosculluela) | 2020 | — | — | — | — | — | — | — | — | — | — | PROMUSICAE: Gold | ENOC |
| "Despeinada" (with Camilo) | 2020 | — | 28 | 1 | 11 | — | — | — | — | 2 | — | PROMUSICAE: 4× Platinum | ENOC |
| "Del Mar" (with Doja Cat and Sia) | 2020 | — (Note: "Del Mar" did not enter the Billboard Hot 100, but peaked at number 20 on the Bubbling Under Hot 100 chart.) | 10 | — | — | — | 30 | — | — | 16 | — | FIMI: Gold; PROMUSICAE: 3× Platinum; SNEP: Diamond | ENOC |
| "Hey Shorty" (Remix) (with Los Legendarios and Chris Andrew) | 2020 | — | — | — | — | — | — | — | — | — | — | RIAA: Gold (Latin) | Los Legendarios 001 |
| "No Drama" (with Becky G) | 2020 | — | 23 | 10 | 65 | — | — | — | — | 48 | 88 | | Non-album single |
| "No Me Acostumbro" (Remix) (with Wisin and Reik featuring Los Legendarios and Miky Woodz) | 2020 | — | — | — | — | — | — | — | — | — | — | RIAA: Platinum (Latin) | Los Legendarios 001 |
| "Feliz Navidad" | 2020 | — | — | — | — | — | — | — | — | — | — | | Non-album single |
| "Los Dioses" (with Anuel AA) | 2021 | — (Note: "Los Dioses" did not enter the Billboard Hot 100, but peaked at number 78 on the Bubbling Under Hot 100 chart.) | 8 | — | — | — | — | — | — | 10 | — | PROMUSICAE: Gold | Los Dioses |
| "Antes" (with Anuel AA) | 2021 | 100 | 5 | 12 | 77 | — | — | — | — | 4 | — | PROMUSICAE: Platinum | Los Dioses |
| "Municiones" (with Anuel AA) | 2021 | — | 30 | — | — | — | — | — | — | 40 | — | | Los Dioses |
| "Travesuras" (Remix) (with Nio García and Casper Mágico featuring Wisin & Yandel, Myke Towers and Flow La Movie) | 2021 | — (Note: "Travesuras" (Remix) did not enter the Billboard Hot 100, but peaked at number 12 on the Bubbling Under Hot 100 chart.) | 9 | 1 | 63 | — | — | — | — | — | — | RIAA: Platinum (Latin); PROMUSICAE: 2× Platinum | Non-album singles |
| "Envidioso" (with Ovi) | 2021 | — | — | — | — | — | — | — | — | — | — | | Non-album singles |
| "Tiempo" | 2021 | — | 12 | 1 | 91 | — | — | — | — | — | — | PROMUSICAE: Gold | Non-album singles |
| "Este Loko" | 2021 | — | 31 | 9 | — | — | — | — | — | — | — | | Non-album singles |
| "A La Buena, El Mejor" (featured in Call of Duty Mobile: Season 7 - Elite of the Elite) | 2021 | — | — | — | — | — | — | — | — | — | — | | Non-album singles |
| "La Funka" | 2021 | — | 13 | 1 | 57 | — | — | — | — | 99 | — | | Non-album singles |
| "Emojis de Corazones" (with Wisin and Jhay Cortez featuring Los Legendarios) | 2021 | — | — | 1 | — | — | — | — | — | 68 | — | RIAA: Platinum (Latin); PROMUSICAE: Gold | Multimillo, Vol. 1 |
| "SG" (with DJ Snake, Megan Thee Stallion, and Lisa) | 2021 | — (Note: "SG" did not enter the Billboard Hot 100, but peaked at number two on the Bubbling Under Hot 100 chart.) | 11 | 1 | — | 86 | 87 | — | — | — | 56 | SNEP: Gold | Non-album singles |
| "Señor Juez" (with Anthony Santos) | 2021 | — | 30 | — | — | — | — | — | — | 66 | — | PROMUSICAE: Gold | Non-album singles |
| "Another Day in America" (with Kali Uchis) | 2021 | — | — | — | — | — | — | — | — | — | — | | Non-album singles |
| "Santo" (with Christina Aguilera) | 2022 | — | — | 7 | — | — | — | — | — | — | — | RIAA: Platinum (Latin) | Non-album singles |
| "Deprimida" | 2022 | — | — | 1 | — | — | — | — | — | — | — | | Non-album singles |
| "G Wagon" | 2022 | — | 36 | 22 | — | — | — | — | — | 96 | — | | Non-album singles |
| "Nos comemos" (with Tiago PZK) | 2022 | — | — | 16 | 14 | — | — | — | — | 22 | — | RIAA: Gold (Latin); PROMUSICAE: 2× Platinum | Non-album singles |
| "Somos Iguales" (with Tokischa) | 2022 | — | 45 | 1 | — | — | — | — | — | — | — | | Ozutochi |
| "Arhbo" (with Gims) | 2022 | — | — | — | — | — | — | — | — | — | — | | FIFA World Cup 2022™ Official Soundtrack |
| "La Copa" | 2022 | — | — (Note: "La Copa" did not enter the Billboard Hot Latin Songs, but peaked at number 14 on the Latin Pop Airplay chart.) | — | — | — | — | — | — | — | — | PROMUSICAE: Gold | Ozutochi |
| "Te Pienso" | 2022 | — | — | — | — | — | — | — | — | — | — | | Ozutochi |
| "Hey Mor" (with Feid) | 2022 | 85 | 11 | 1 | 14 | — | — | — | — | 3 | — | PROMUSICAE: 7× Platinum | Ozutochi |
| "Monotonía" (with Shakira) | 2022 | 65 | 3 | — | 7 | — | 137 | 67 | — | 3 | 17 | RIAA: 7× Platinum (Latin); FIMI: Gold; PROMUSICAE: 4× Platinum | Las Mujeres Ya No Lloran |
| "Chao Bebe" (with Ovy on the Drums) | 2022 | — | — | 20 | 98 | — | — | — | — | 79 | — | | Non-album single |
| "Stars" (with PNAU and Bebe Rexha) | 2023 | — | — | — | — | — | — | — | — | — | — | | Hyperbolic |
| "Tucu" (with Amarion) | 2023 | — | — | 1 | — | — | — | — | — | — | — | | Afro |
| "El Plan" (with Chencho Corleone & Sky Rompiendo) | 2023 | — | — | — | — | — | — | — | — | — | — | | Cosmo |
| "Vocation" (with David Guetta) | 2023 | — | — | 11 | — | — | — | — | — | 69 | — | PROMUSICAE: Gold | Cosmo |
| "Fenti" (with Jhayco) | 2023 | — | — | — | — | — | — | — | — | 79 | — | | Cosmo |
| "Lollipop" (Remix) (with Darell and Maluma) | 2024 | — | — | 7 | — | — | — | — | — | 39 | — | RIAA: Gold (Latin); PROMUSICAE: Gold | Non-album singles |
| "Guay" (with Bad Gyal) | 2024 | — | — | 18 | — | — | — | — | — | 8 | — | PROMUSICAE: Platinum | Non-album singles |
| "Gata Only" (remix) (with FloyyMenor and Anitta) | 2024 | — | — | — | — | — | — | — | — | 64 | — | | Non-album singles |
| "Tengo Un Plan" (Remix) (with Key-Key) | 2024 | — | — | 12 | — | — | — | — | — | 78 | — | | Non-album singles |
| "Razones" (with Anuel AA, DJ Luian, and Mambo Kingz) | 2024 | — | — | 14 | — | — | — | — | — | 21 | — | | Non-album singles |
| "Ya No Comparto" (with Natti Natasha) | 2025 | — | — | — | — | — | — | — | — | — | — | | Natti Natasha en Amargue |
| "Más Que Tú" (with Kapo) | 2025 | — | 43 | 1 | — | — | — | — | — | 72 | — | | |
| "Contar" (with JC Reyes) | 2025 | — | — | — | — | — | — | — | — | 47 | — | | Nacer de Nuevo |
| "Última Noche" (with Bad Gyal) | 2025 | — | — | — | — | — | — | — | — | 24 | — | | Más Cara |
| "La Nena" | 2025 | — | — | — | — | — | — | — | — | — | — | | |
| "Sirenita" | 2025 | — | 32 | 1 | — | — | — | — | — | — | — | | |
| "El Spot" (with Bryant Myers) | 2025 | — | — | — | — | — | — | — | — | — | — | | Millo Gangster Club |
| "no lo ves" (with Grupo Frontera) | 2025 | — | — | — | — | — | — | — | — | — | — | | Lo Que Me Falta Por Llorar |
| "Enemigos" (with Beéle) | 2025 | — | 26 | 1 | — | — | — | — | — | 47 | — | | Stendhal |
| "Pikito" (with Beéle) | 2025 | — | — | — | — | — | — | — | — | 65 | — | | Stendhal |
| "Un Kiss - Remix" (with Fronti) | 2025 | — | — | — | — | — | — | — | — | — | — | | |
| "Una Aventura" | 2026 | — | 18 | — | — | — | — | — | — | 39 | — | | |
"—" denotes a single that did not chart or was not released in that territory.

=== As featured artist ===
| Title | Year | Peaks | | | | | | | | | | Certifications | Album |
| Title | Year | US | US Latin | US Latin Rhy. | ARG | CAN | FRA | ITA | NL | SPA | SWI | Certifications | Album |
|---|---|---|---|---|---|---|---|---|---|---|---|---|---|
| "Te Fuiste" (Pusho featuring Ozuna) | 2016 | — | — | — | — | — | — | — | — | — | — | RIAA: 2× Platinum (Latin) | Non-album singles |
| "Ella y Yo" (Remix) (Pepe Quintana featuring Arcángel, Farruko, Kevin Roldán, Ñejo, Ñengo Flow, Darell, Anuel AA, Bryant Myers and Ozuna) | 2016 | — | — | — | — | — | — | — | — | — | — | RIAA: Gold (Latin) | Non-album singles |
| "La Rompe Corazones" (Daddy Yankee featuring Ozuna) | 2017 | — | 12 | 4 | — | — | — | — | — | 8 | — | FIMI: Gold; PROMUSICAE: 3× Platinum | El Disco Duro |
| "Escápate Conmigo" (Wisin featuring Ozuna) | 2017 | 63 | 3 | 1 | — | — | — | — | — | 8 | — | FIMI: Platinum; PROMUSICAE: 4× Platinum | Victory |
| "Soy Peor" (Remix) (Bad Bunny featuring J Balvin, Ozuna and Arcángel) | 2017 | — | — | — | — | — | — | — | — | — | — | RIAA: Platinum (Latin) | Non-album singles |
| "El Amante" (Remix) (Nicky Jam featuring Ozuna and Bad Bunny) | 2017 | — | — | — | — | — | — | — | — | — | — | | Non-album singles |
| "No Quiero Amores" (Yandel featuring Ozuna) | 2017 | — | — | — | — | — | — | — | — | — | — | RIAA: 2× Platinum (Latin) | Update |
| "Choka Choka" (Chayanne featuring Ozuna) | 2017 | — | 41 | 13 | — | — | — | — | — | — | — | RIAA: Gold (Latin) | Non-album singles |
| "Bonita" (Remix) (J Balvin and Jowell & Randy featuring Wisin & Yandel, Nicky Jam and Ozuna) | 2017 | — (Note: "Bonita" did not enter the Billboard Hot 100, but peaked at number five on the Bubbling Under Hot 100 chart.) | 8 | 6 | — | — | — | — | — | — | — | | Non-album singles |
| "Sobredosis" (Romeo Santos featuring Ozuna) | 2018 | — | 23 | — | — | — | — | — | — | — | — | FIMI: Gold; PROMUSICAE: 2× Platinum | Golden |
| "Me niego" (Reik featuring Ozuna and Wisin) | 2018 | 77 | 6 | 1 | 9 | — | — | 39 | — | 2 | — | RIAA: 21× Platinum (Latin); FIMI: Platinum; PROMUSICAE: 4× Platinum | Ahora |
| "La Ocasión" (DJ Luian, Mambo Kingz and De La Ghetto featuring Arcángel, Ozuna and Anuel AA) | 2018 | — | 21 | 23 | — | — | — | — | — | — | — | RIAA: 13× Platinum (Latin); PROMUSICAE: Platinum | Non-album singles |
| "Te Boté (Remix)" (Nio García, Darell, and Casper Magico featuring Bad Bunny, Nicky Jam and Ozuna) | 2018 | 36 | 1 | 2 | 20 | 98 | — | — | — | — | 38 | RIAA: 10× Diamond (Latin) | Non-album singles |
| "X" (Remix) (Nicky Jam & J Balvin featuring Maluma and Ozuna) | 2018 | — | — | — | — | — | — | — | — | 15 | — | PROMUSICAE: Platinum | Non-album singles |
| "Quisiera Alejarme" (Wisin featuring Ozuna) | 2018 | — | 13 | 1 | — | — | — | — | — | — | — | | Victory |
| "Taki Taki" (DJ Snake featuring Selena Gomez, Ozuna and Cardi B) | 2018 | 11 | 1 | 1 | 1 | — | 2 | 2 | 3 | 1 | 3 | RIAA: 4× Platinum; FIMI: 2× Platinum; MC: 3× Platinum; PROMUSICAE: 3× Platinum; SNEP: Diamond | Carte Blanche |
| "Asesina" (Remix) (Brytiago and Darell featuring Daddy Yankee, Ozuna and Anuel AA) | 2018 | — (Note: "Asesina" (Remix) did not enter the Billboard Hot 100, but peaked at 13 on the Bubbling Under Hot 100 chart.) | 7 | 16 | 11 | 7 | — | — | — | — | — | RIAA: 4× Platinum (Latin) | Non-album single |
| "Callao" (Wisin & Yandel featuring Ozuna) | 2018 | — | 44 | — | 94 | — | — | — | — | 93 | — | RIAA: 3× Platinum (Latin) | Los Campeones del Pueblo: The Big Leagues |
| "China" (Anuel AA, Daddy Yankee and Karol G featuring Ozuna and J Balvin) | 2019 | 43 | 1 | 1 | 1 | 77 | 47 | 15 | 27 | 1 | 10 | RIAA: Gold (Latin); FIMI: 2× Platinum; PROMUSICAE: 7× Platinum; SNEP: Gold | Emmanuel |
| "Millonario" (Remix) (Messiah and Nicky Jam featuring Ozuna) | 2021 | — | — | 25 | — | — | — | — | — | — | — | | Non-album singles |
| "A Mi Manera" (Remix) (Omy De Oro featuring Ozuna) | 2021 | — | — | — | — | — | — | — | — | — | — | RIAA: Platinum (Latin) | Non-album singles |
| "Santo" (Christina Aguilera featuring Ozuna) | 2022 | — | 24 | 7 | — | — | — | — | — | 72 | — | | La Fuerza and Aguilera |
| "Mirage" (AriBeatz featuring Ozuna, Gims and Sfera Ebbasta) | 2023 | — | — | — | — | — | 53 | 9 | — | — | 36 | | Non-album single |
| "Bad Boy" (Chris Jedi, Gaby Music and Dei V featuring Anuel AA and Ozuna) | 2024 | — | 46 | — | — | — | — | — | — | 19 | — | PROMUSICAE: Gold | Los Marcianos Vol.1: Dei V Version |
"—" denotes a single that did not chart or was not released in that territory.

== Other charted and certified songs ==
| Title | Year | Peaks | | | | Certifications | Album |
| Title | Year | US Latin | US Latin Rhy. | ARG | SPA | Certifications | Album |
|---|---|---|---|---|---|---|---|
| "Yo Soy Yo" (with Pirulo y la Tribu) | 2017 | — | 16 | — | — | | Calle Linda 2 |
| "Quiero Repetir" (featuring J Balvin) | 2017 | 28 | — | — | 33 | PROMUSICAE: Platinum | Odisea |
| "Odisea" | 2017 | — | — | — | — | RIAA: Gold (Latin) | Odisea |
| "Una Flor" | 2017 | — | — | — | — | RIAA: 4× Platinum (Latin) | Odisea |
| "Egoista" (featuring Zion & Lennox) | 2017 | — | — | — | — | RIAA: 4× Platinum (Latin); PROMUSICAE: Gold | Odisea |
| "100" (with Anuel AA) | 2018 | 16 | — | — | 23 | | Los Dioses |
| "Dime Tú" (with Anuel AA) | 2018 | 27 | — | — | — | | Los Dioses |
| "RD" (with Anuel AA) | 2018 | 17 | — | — | 31 | | Los Dioses |
| "Nena Buena" (with Anuel AA) | 2018 | 23 | — | — | 28 | PROMUSICAE: Gold | Los Dioses |
| "Contra el Mundo" (with Anuel AA) | 2018 | 42 | — | — | 76 | | Los Dioses |
| "Perreo" (with Anuel AA) | 2018 | 32 | — | — | 37 | | Los Dioses |
| "Perfecto" (with Anuel AA) | 2018 | 35 | — | — | 77 | | Los Dioses |
| "La María" (with Anuel AA) | 2018 | 18 | — | — | 65 | | Los Dioses |
| "Nunca" (with Anuel AA) | 2018 | 25 | — | — | 46 | | Los Dioses |
| "Me Dijeron" | 2018 | 11 | — | — | 30 | PROMUSICAE: Platinum | Aura |
| "Tu Olor" | 2018 | 27 | — | — | — | | Aura |
| "Supuestamente" (featuring Anuel AA) | 2018 | 32 | — | — | 89 | PROMUSICAE: Gold | Aura |
| "Escape" | 2018 | 39 | — | — | — | | Aura |
| "Haciéndolo" (featuring Nicky Jam) | 2018 | 41 | — | — | — | | Aura |
| "Coméntale" (featuring Akon) | 2018 | 44 | — | — | — | | Aura |
| "Hola" | 2018 | 45 | — | — | — | | Aura |
| "Aunque me Porté Mal" | 2018 | 47 | — | — | — | | Aura |
| "Ibiza" (featuring Romeo Santos) | 2018 | 13 | 20 | — | 7 | FIMI: Gold; PROMUSICAE: 3× Platinum | Aura |
| "Aura" (featuring Arthur Hanlon) | 2018 | 14 | — | — | 63 | | Aura |
| "Pasado y presente" (featuring Anuel AA) | 2018 | 28 | — | — | 92 | | Aura |
| "Sígueme los Pasos" (featuring J Balvin and Natti Natasha) | 2018 | 37 | — | — | 99 | | Aura |
| "Quiero Más" (featuring Wisin & Yandel) | 2018 | 20 | — | — | 100 | | Aura |
| "Brindemos" (Anuel AA featuring Ozuna) | 2018 | 17 | — | — | 67 | RIAA: 7× Platinum (Latin); PROMUSICAE: Platinum | Real Hasta la Muerte |
| "Quizás" (with Brytiago and Lunay) | 2020 | — | — | — | — | RIAA: Gold (Latin) | Orgánico |
| "No Se Da Cuenta" (with Daddy Yankee) | 2020 | 35 | — | 99 | — | PROMUSICAE: Gold | ENOC |
| "Una Locura" (with J Balvin and Chencho Corleone) | 2020 | 32 | 18 | 25 | 3 | PROMUSICAE: 3× Platinum | ENOC |
| "Patek" (with Anuel AA and Snoop Dogg) | 2020 | 49 | — | — | 71 | | ENOC |
| "Apretaito" (with Boza) | 2022 | — | 15 | — | 83 | | non-album single |
| "Mañana" | 2022 | — | — | — | 86 | | non-album single |
| "Te Menti" (with Saiko and Ovy on the Drums) | 2022 | — | — | — | 31 | PROMUSICAE: Gold | non-album single |
| "Eva Longoria" (featuring Davido) | 2023 | — | — | — | 10 | PROMUSICAE: 2× Platinum | Afro |
| "Baccarat" | 2023 | — (Note: "Baccarat" did not enter the Billboard Hot Latin Songs, but peaked at number one on the Latin Airplay chart.) | 1 | — | — | | Cosmo |
| "Pa Ti Estoy" (with Anuel AA and Chris Jedi) | 2023 | — | — | — | 81 | PROMUSICAE: Gold | Cosmo |
"—" denotes a single that did not chart or was not released in that territory.
