= List of Billboard Latin Rhythm Airplay number ones of 2021 =

The Billboard Latin Rhythm Airplay is a chart that ranks the best-performing Spanish-language Latin rhythm singles in the United States. Published by Billboard magazine, the data is compiled by Nielsen SoundScan based collectively on each single's weekly airplay.

== Chart history ==
Key
†	Indicates number 1 on Billboard's year-end Latin rhythm chart

Issue date	Song	Artist	Ref
January 2	"Hawái" †	Maluma and the Weeknd	
January 9	"Dakiti"	Bad Bunny and Jhay Cortez	
January 16	"Mi Niña"	Los Legendarios, Wisin, and Myke Towers	
January 23	"La Nota"	Manuel Turizo, Rauw Alejandro and Myke Towers	
January 30	"Hawái" †	Maluma and the Weeknd	
February 6	"Despeinada"	Ozuna and Camilo	
February 13	"Bichota"	Karol G	
February 20	"Chica Ideal"	Guaynaa and Sebastián Yatra	
February 27	"Hawái" †	Maluma and the Weeknd	
March 6	"Travesuras"	Nio Garcia, Casper Magico, Ozuna, Wisin, Yandel, Myke Towers, Flow La Movie	
March 13	"Dakiti"	Bad Bunny and Jhay Cortez	
March 20	"Dakiti"	Bad Bunny and Jhay Cortez	
March 27	"Baila Conmigo"	Selena Gomez and Rauw Alejandro	
April 3	"Tu Veneno"	J Balvin	
April 10	"Location"	Karol G, Anuel AA, and J Balvin	
April 17	"Tu Veneno"	J Balvin	
April 24	"La Noche de Anoche"	Bad Bunny and Rosalía	
May 1	"Fan de Tus Fotos"	Nicky Jam and Romeo Santos	
May 8	"La Noche de Anoche"	Bad Bunny and Rosalía	
May 15	"Problema"	Daddy Yankee	
May 22	"Problema"	Daddy Yankee	
May 29	"Vacío"	Luis Fonsi and Rauw Alejandro	
June 5	"El Makinón"	Karol G and Mariah Angeliq	
June 12	"Fiel"	Los Legendarios, Wisin and Jhayco	
June 19	"Bandido"	Myke Towers and Juhn	
June 26	"Tiempo"	Myke Towers and Juhn	
July 3	"Todo de Ti"	Rauw Alejandro	
July 10	"Otra Noche Sin Ti"	J Balvin and Khalid	
July 17	"Ram Pam Pam"	Natti Natasha and Becky G	
July 24	"Todo de Ti"	Rauw Alejandro	
July 31	"Todo de Ti"	Rauw Alejandro	
August 7	"Viendo el Techo"	Jay Wheeler	
August 14	"Pareja del Año"	Sebastián Yatra and Myke Towers	
August 21	"Todo de Ti"	Rauw Alejandro	
August 28	"Loco"	Justin Quiles, Chimbala and Zion & Lennox	
September 4	"Yonaguni"	Bad Bunny	
September 11	"In da Getto"	J Balvin and Skrillex	
September 18	"Deja vú"	Tainy and Yandel	
September 25	"La Funka"	Ozuna	
October 2	"Me Pasé"	Enrique Iglesias featuring Farruko	
October 9	"Pepas"	Farruko	
October 16	"Noches en Miami"	Natti Natasha	
October 23	"Volví"	Aventura and Bad Bunny	
October 30	"Volví"	Aventura and Bad Bunny	
November 6	"Sobrio"	Maluma	
November 13	"Pepas"	Farruko	
November 20	"Pepas"	Farruko	
November 27	"Bésame"	Luis Fonsi and Myke Towers	
December 4	"Dos Tragos"	Jay Wheeler	
December 11	"Sal y Perrea"	Sech, Daddy Yankee, and J Balvin	
December 18	"Pepas"	Farruko	
December 25	"Todo de Ti"	Rauw Alejandro	
