= List of Billboard Latin Rhythm Albums number ones of 2020 =

The Latin Rhythm Albums chart is a music chart published in Billboard magazine. The data is compiled by Nielsen SoundScan from a sample that includes music stores, music departments at electronics and department stores, internet sales (both physical and digital) and verifiable sales from concert venues in the United States. The chart is composed of studio, live, and compilation releases by Latin artists performing in the Latin hip hop, urban, dance and reggaeton, the most popular Latin Rhythm music genres.

== Albums ==
Chart date	Album	Artist(s)	Reference
January 4	X 100pre	Bad Bunny	
January 11	X 100pre	Bad Bunny	
January 18	X 100pre	Bad Bunny	
January 25	X 100pre	Bad Bunny	
February 1	X 100pre	Bad Bunny	
February 8	Easy Money Baby	Myke Towers	
February 15	X 100pre	Bad Bunny	
February 22	X 100pre	Bad Bunny	
February 29	X 100pre	Bad Bunny	
March 7	X 100pre	Bad Bunny	
March 14	YHLQMDLG	Bad Bunny	
March 21	YHLQMDLG	Bad Bunny	
March 28	YHLQMDLG	Bad Bunny	
April 4	YHLQMDLG	Bad Bunny	
April 11	YHLQMDLG	Bad Bunny	
April 18	YHLQMDLG	Bad Bunny	
April 25	YHLQMDLG	Bad Bunny	
May 2	YHLQMDLG	Bad Bunny	
May 9	YHLQMDLG	Bad Bunny	
May 16	YHLQMDLG	Bad Bunny	
May 23	Las que no iban a salir	Bad Bunny	
May 30	YHLQMDLG	Bad Bunny	
June 6	YHLQMDLG	Bad Bunny	
June 13	Emmanuel	Anuel AA	
June 20	YHLQMDLG	Bad Bunny	
June 27	YHLQMDLG	Bad Bunny	
July 4	YHLQMDLG	Bad Bunny	
July 11	YHLQMDLG	Bad Bunny	
July 18	YHLQMDLG	Bad Bunny	
July 25	YHLQMDLG	Bad Bunny	
August 1	YHLQMDLG	Bad Bunny	
August 8	YHLQMDLG	Bad Bunny	
August 15	YHLQMDLG	Bad Bunny	
August 22	YHLQMDLG	Bad Bunny	
August 29	YHLQMDLG	Bad Bunny	
September 5	YHLQMDLG	Bad Bunny	
September 12	YHLQMDLG	Bad Bunny	
September 19	ENOC	Ozuna	
September 26	YHLQMDLG	Bad Bunny	
October 3	YHLQMDLG	Bad Bunny	
October 10	YHLQMDLG	Bad Bunny	
October 17	YHLQMDLG	Bad Bunny	
October 24	YHLQMDLG	Bad Bunny	
October 31	YHLQMDLG	Bad Bunny	
November 7	YHLQMDLG	Bad Bunny	
November 14	YHLQMDLG	Bad Bunny	
November 21	YHLQMDLG	Bad Bunny	
November 28	YHLQMDLG	Bad Bunny	
December 5	YHLQMDLG	Bad Bunny	
December 12	El Último Tour Del Mundo	Bad Bunny	
December 19	El Último Tour Del Mundo	Bad Bunny	
December 26	El Último Tour Del Mundo	Bad Bunny	
