= Premio Lo Nuestro 2021 =

33rd Lo Nuestro Awards
- Date: February 18, 2021
- Site: American Airlines Arena; Miami, Florida, U.S.
- Most wins: Bad Bunny (7)
- Most nominations: J Balvin (14)

Television/radio coverage
- Network: Univision

The 33rd Lo Nuestro Awards ceremony, presented and televised by American television network Univision and Las Estrellas, will recognize the most popular Spanish-language music of 2020 that was played on Uforia Audio Network during the year in 35 categories. The ceremony was held on February 18, 2021, at the American Airlines Arena in Miami.

== Performers ==
Below is the list of the live performances of the artists and the songs they performed:

| Name(s) | Performed |
|---|---|
| Selena Gomez and Rauw Alejandro | "Baila Conmigo" |
| Gloria Trevi and Ivy Queen | "Pelo Suelto" / "Cinco Minutos" / "Todos Me Miran" / "Grande" / "Gloria" |
| Luis Fonsi and Rauw Alejandro | "Vacío" |
| Maluma | "Agua de Jamaica" / "La Burbuja" / "Hawái" |
| Daddy Yankee and Marc Anthony | "De Vuelta Pa La Vuelta" |
| Maluma and Carlos Rivera | "100 Años" |
| CNCO and Ricardo Montaner | "Dejaría Todo" / "Un Beso" / "Tan Enamorados" |
| Víctor Manuelle and La India | "Víctimas Las Dos" |
| Camilo and El Alfa | "Bebê" |
| Anuel AA and Ozuna | "Antes" / "RD" |
| Wisin, Rauw Alejandro, Jhay Cortez, Zion & Lennox, Carlos Vives, Lunay & Maluma | "Fiel" / "Mayor Que Yo" / "Vacaciones" / "Nota de Amor" |
| Natti Natasha and Prince Royce | "Antes Que Salga El Sol" |
| Justin Quiles | "Jeans" |
| Mau y Ricky, Evaluna Montaner, Camilo and Ricardo Montaner | "Amén" |
| Grupo Firme, Lenin Ramírez and Chesca | "El Cambio (Mariachi)" "Yo Ya No Vuelvo Contigo" |
| Farina | "La Boca" |
| Zion & Lennox and El Alfa | "Gota Gota" |
| Joss Favela and Jessi Uribe | "El Alumno" |
| Guaynaa | "Monterrey" |
| Alejandra Guzmán, Yuri and Lila Downs | "Te Extraño" / "Adoro" / "Voy A Apagar La Luz" |
| Gloria Trevi, Chiquis, Kinky and Los Ángeles Azules | "El Listón De Tu Pelo" / "Cómo Te Voy a Olvidar" / "Mis Sentimientos" |

== Winners and nominees ==
The nominees for the 33rd Lo Nuestro Awards were announced digitally on January 12, 2021, by Univision.

=== General ===
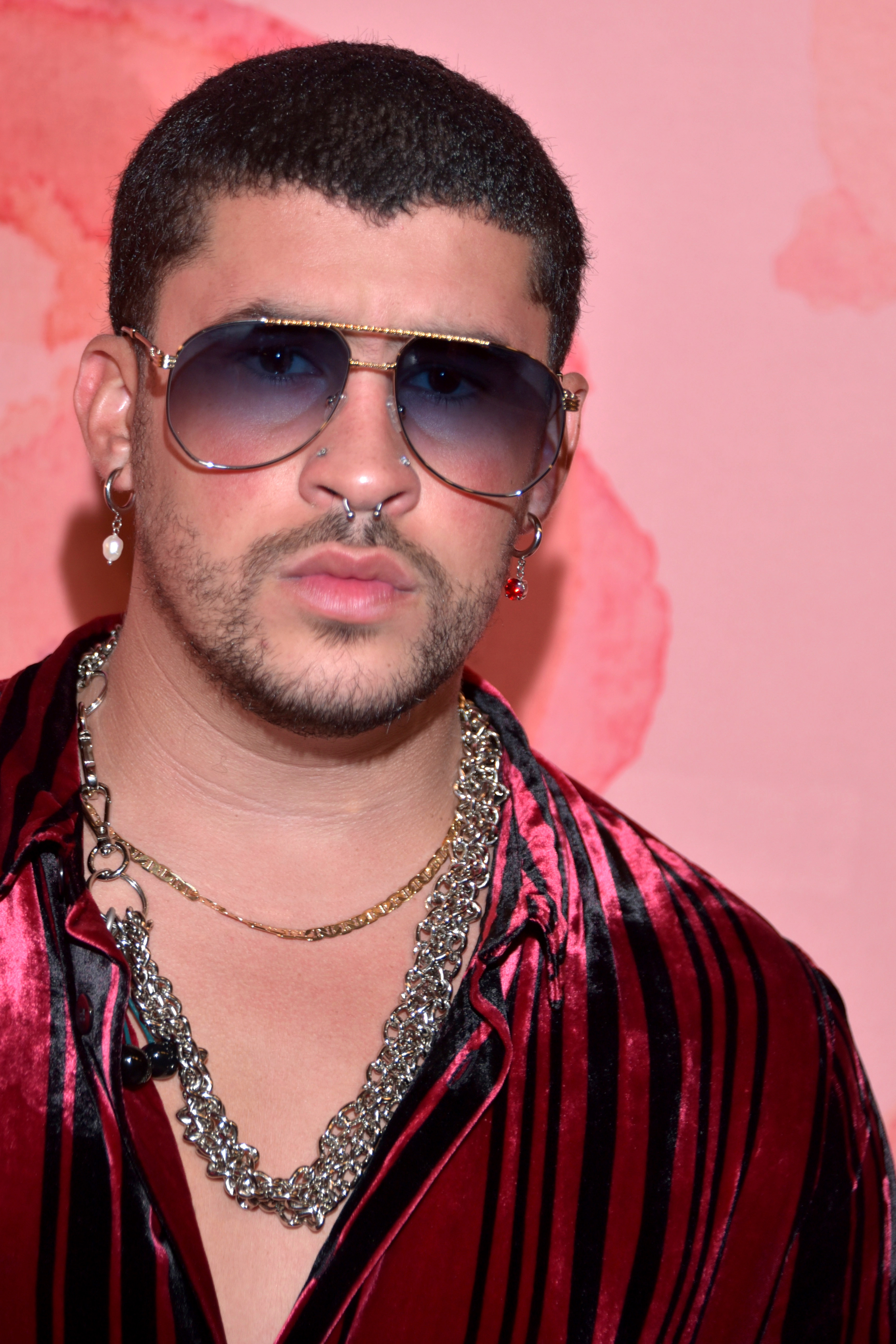
Bad Bunny, Artist of the Year, Album of the Year, Crossover Collaboration, Male Urban Artist, Urban Song, Urban Album and Urban/Trap Song winner

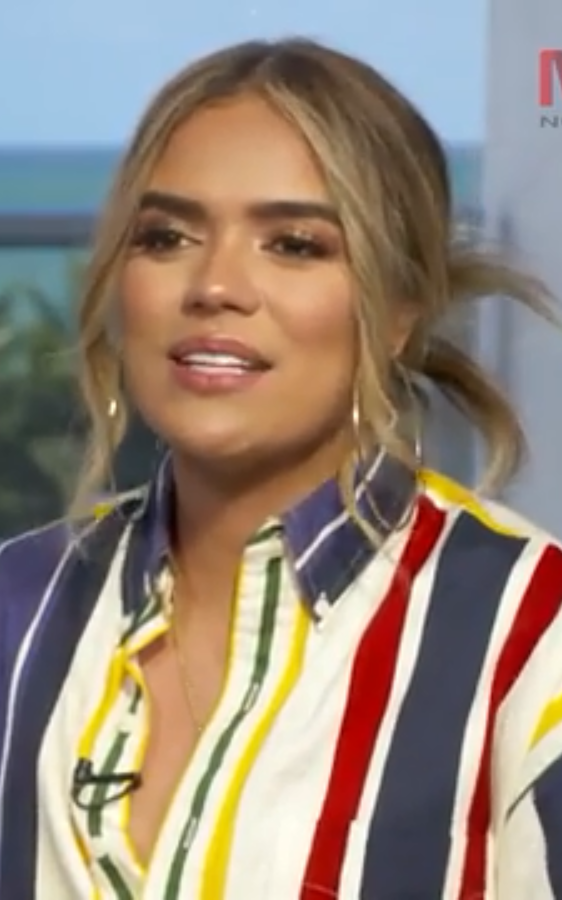
Karol G, Female Urban Artist of the Year, Song of the Year and Urban Collaboration of the Year winner

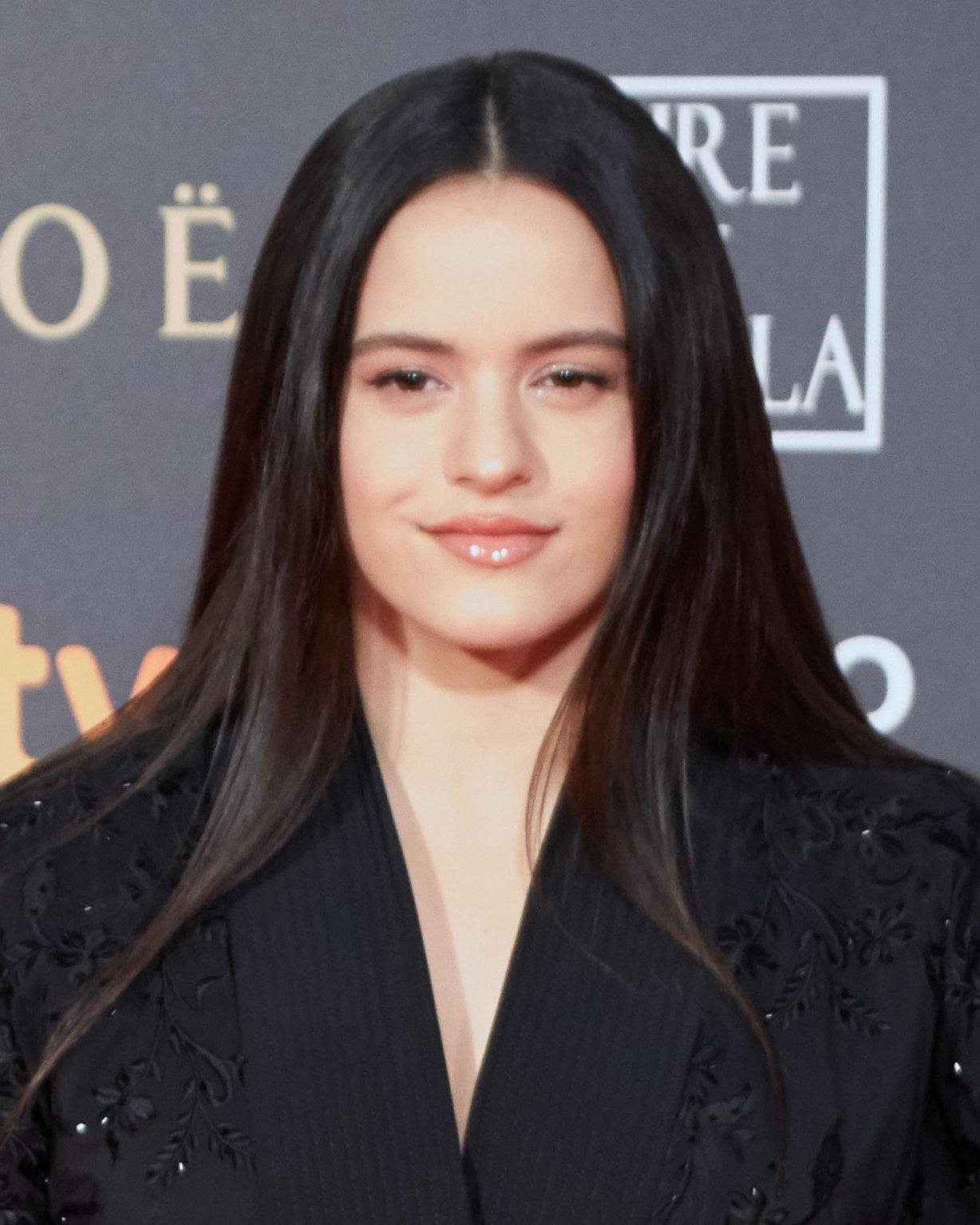
Rosalía, Video of the Year winner

| Artist of the Year: Bad Bunny; Alejandro Fernández; Camilo; Christian Nodal; J Balvin; Karol G; Maluma; Natti Natasha; Ozuna; Sebastián Yatra | Album of the Year: YHLQMDLG – Bad Bunny; Alter Ego – Prince Royce; Ayayay! – Christian Nodal; Colores – J Balvin; De Buenos Aires Para el Mundo – Los Ángeles Azules; Guárdame Esta Noche – El Fantasma; Hecho en México – Alejandro Fernández; Más Caro Que Ayer – Gerardo Ortíz; Más Futuro Que Pasado – Juanes; Papi Juancho – Maluma |
| Song of the Year: "Tusa" – Karol G & Nicki Minaj; "ADMV" – Maluma; "Bonita" – Juanes & Sebastián Yatra; "Carita de Inocente" – Prince Royce; "Fantasía" – Ozuna; "Favorito" – Camilo; "Keii" – Anuel AA; "La Mejor Versión De Mí (Remix)" – Natti Natasha & Romeo Santos; "Morado" – J Balvin; "Solo Tú" – Calibre 50 | Video of the Year: "TKN" – Rosalía & Travis Scott; "Boogaloo Supreme" – Víctor Manuelle & Wisin; "Cuando Estés Aquí" – Pablo Alborán; "Después De Todo" – Yordano; "En Cantos" – Ile & Natalia Lafourcade; "For Sale" – Carlos Vives & Alejandro Sanz; "Girasoles" – Luis Fonsi; "Mala Vida" – Nicki Nicole; "Pecador" – Residente; "Qué Lástima" – Chocquibtown & Sech |
| New Artist – Female: Nicki Nicole; Chesca; Emilia; Nathy Peluso; Yenni S | New Artist – Male: Camilo; Jay Wheeler; Natanael Cano; Rauw Alejandro; Neto Bernal |
| Crossover Collaboration of the Year: "Un Día (One Day)" – J Balvin, Dua Lipa, Bad Bunny featuring Tainy; "Hawái (Remix)" – Maluma & The Weeknd; "Mamacita" – Black Eyed Peas, Ozuna & J. Rey Soul; "Me Gusta" – Anitta, Cardi B & Myke Towers; "Me Quedaré Contigo" – Pitbull, Ne-Yo feat. Lenier & El Micha; "Qué Maldición" – Banda MS de Sergio Lizárraga & Snoop Dogg; "Ritmo (Bad Boys For Life)" – Black Eyed Peas & J Balvin; "Súbelo (Further Up)" – Static & Ben El Tavori, Pitbull & Chesca; "TKN" – Rosalía & Travis Scott; "Tusa" – Karol G & Nicki Minaj | Remix of the Year: "La Jeepeta (Remix)" – Nio Garcia, Anuel AA, Myke Towers, Brray & Juanka; "Caramelo (Remix)" – Ozuna, Karol G & Myke Towers; "DJ No Pare (Remix)" – Justin Quiles, Natti Natasha, Farruko ft. Zion, Dalex & Lenny Tavárez; "Hawái (Remix)" – Maluma & The Weeknd; "La Cama (Remix)" – Lunay, Myke Towers, Ozuna, Chencho Corleone & Rauw Alejandro; "La Mejor Versión De Mí (Remix)" – Natti Natasha & Romeo Santos; "Porfa (Remix)" – Feid, Justin Quiles, J Balvin ft. Maluma, Nicky Jam & Sech; "Relación (Remix)" – Sech, Daddy Yankee, J Balvin ft. Rosalía & Farruko; "Tattoo (Remix)" – Rauw Alejandro & Camilo; "Yo No Sé (Remix)" – Maxi Gómez, Nicky Jam & Reik |

=== Pop ===
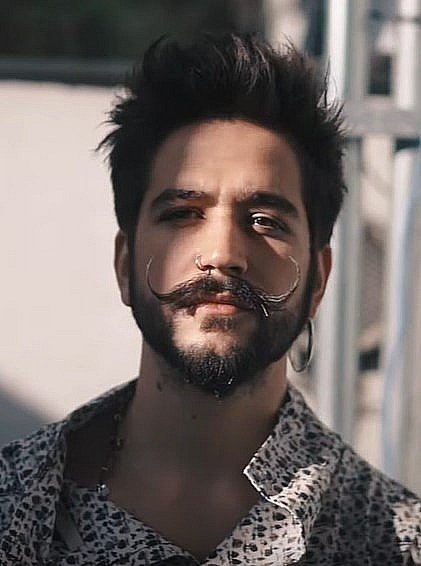
Camilo, New Artist – Male, Pop Artist, Pop Album, Pop Collaboration and Urban/Pop Song winner

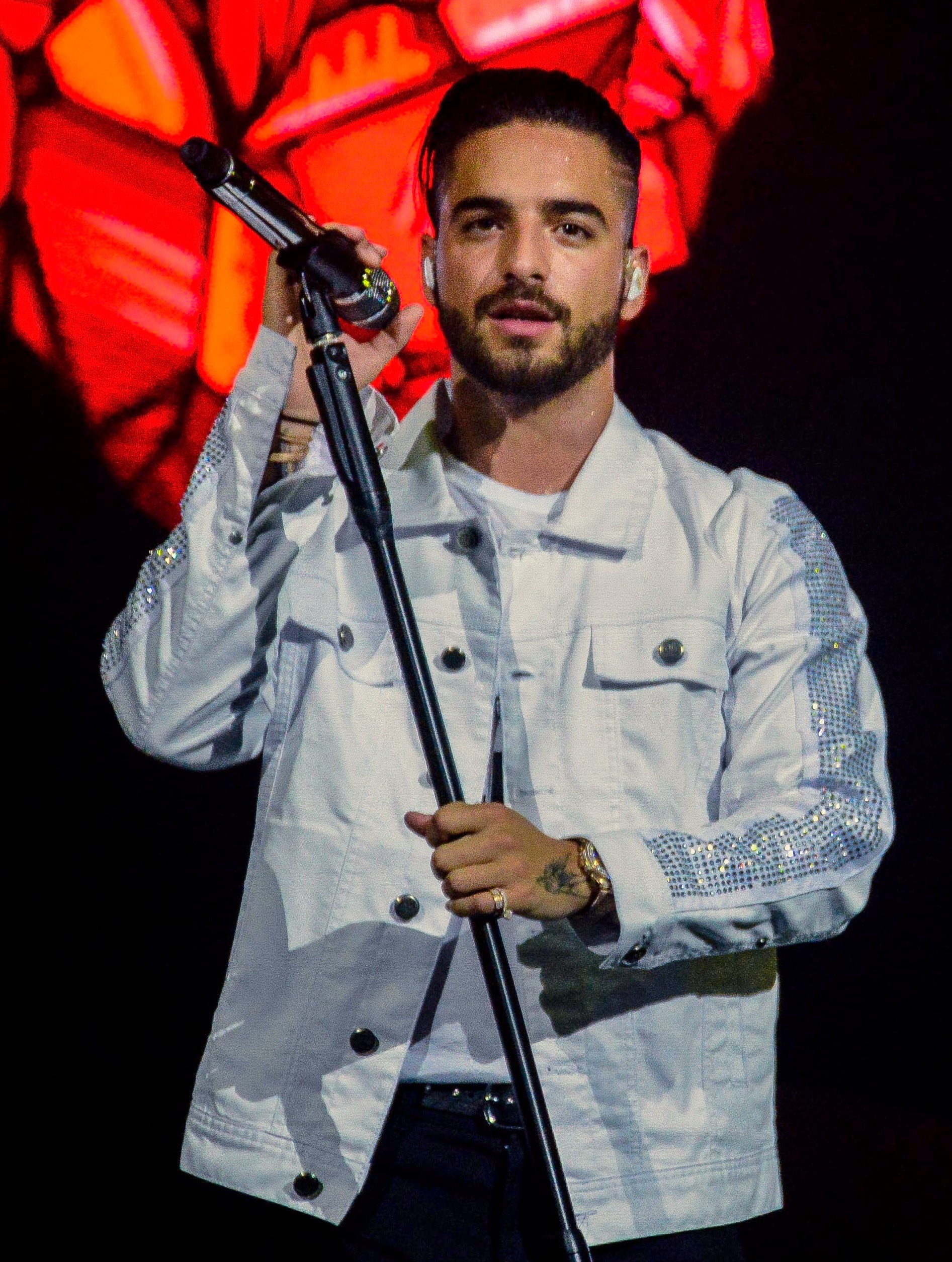
Maluma, Pop Song and Pop/Ballad Song winner

| Pop Artist of the Year: Camilo; Carlos Rivera; Enrique Iglesias; Jennifer Lopez; Juanes; Kany García; Pedro Capó; Ricky Martin; Sebastián Yatra; Shakira | Pop Album of the Year: Por Primera Vez – Camilo; Aire – Jesse & Joy; Blanco – Ricardo Arjona; Colegio – Cali y El Dandee; Más Futuro Que Pasado – Juanes; Mesa Para Dos – Kany García; Munay – Pedro Capó; Pausa – Ricky Martin; Que Quiénes Somos – CNCO; 20–21 – Reik |
| Pop Collaboration of the Year: "Si Me Dices Que Sí" – Reik, Farruko & Camilo; "Bonita" – Juanes & Sebastián Yatra; "Como Así" – Lali featuring CNCO; "El Ciego" – Melendi & Cali y El Dandee; "For Sale" – Carlos Vives & Alejandro Sanz; "Muchacha" – Gente de Zona & Becky G; "Perdiendo La Cabeza" – Carlos Rivera, Becky G & Pedro Capó; "Tabú" – Pablo Alborán & Ava Max; "Tanto" – Jesse & Joy featuring Luis Fonsi; "Una Mentira Más" – Yuri & Natalia Jiménez | Pop Song of the Year: "ADMV" – Maluma; "Bonita" – Juanes & Sebastián Yatra; "Buena Suerte" – Pedro Capó; "Favorito" – Camilo; "Perdiendo la Cabeza" – Carlos Rivera, Becky G & Pedro Capó; "No Ha Parado de Llover" – Maná & Sebastián Yatra; "Si Me Dices Que Sí" – Reik, Farruko & Camilo; "Tabú" – Pablo Alborán & Ava Max; "Tanto" – Jesse & Joy & Luis Fonsi; "Tiburones" – Ricky Martin |
| Pop Group or Duo of the Year: CNCO; Cali y El Dandee; Jesse & Joy; Mau y Ricky; Reik | Pop/Ballad Song of the Year: "ADMV" – Maluma; "Hongos" – Ricardo Arjona; "Lo Que En Ti Veo" – Kany García & Nahuel Pennisi; "Te Adoraré" – Ricardo Montaner; "Una Mentira Más" – Yuri & Natalia Jiménez |

=== Urban ===
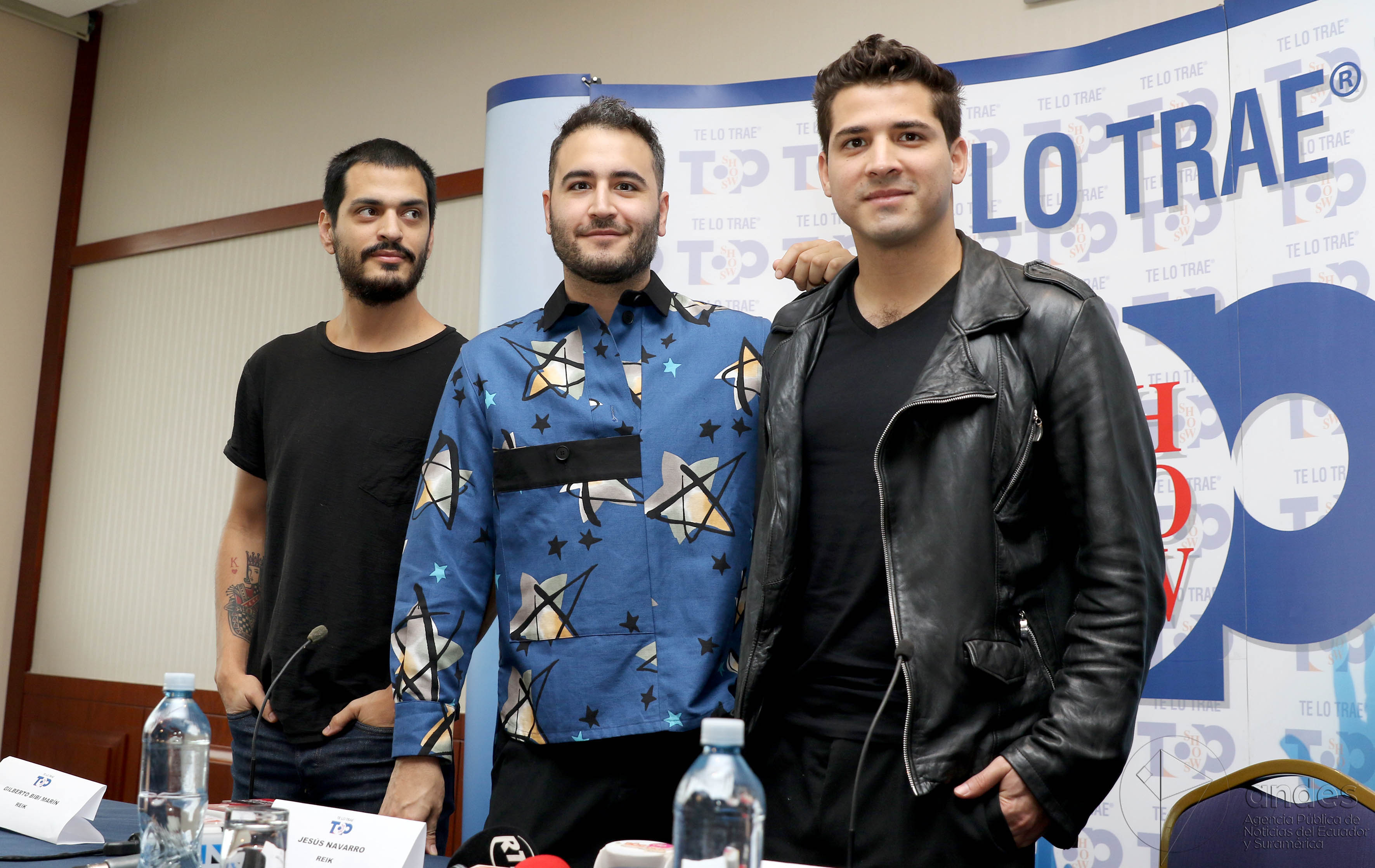
Reik, Urban/Pop Song winner

| Female Urban Artist of the Year: Karol G; Anitta; Becky G; Cazzu; Ivy Queen; Natti Natasha; Paloma Mami; Rosalía | Male Urban Artist of the Year: Bad Bunny; Anuel AA; Daddy Yankee; Farruko; J Balvin; Maluma; Ozuna; Sech |
| Urban Song of the Year: "La Difícil" – Bad Bunny; "Fantasía" – Ozuna; "Hawái" – Maluma; "Keii" – Anuel AA; "Morado" – J Balvin; "Muévelo" – Nicky Jam & Daddy Yankee; "Que Tire Pa Lante" – Daddy Yankee; "Sigues Con Él" – Arcángel & Sech; "Ritmo (Bad Boys For Life)" – Black Eyed Peas & J Balvin; "Tusa" – Karol G & Nicki Minaj | Urban Collaboration of the Year: "Tusa" - Karol G & Nicki Minaj; "Muévelo’ -Nicky Jam & Daddy Yankee; "Qué Pena" – Maluma & J Balvin; "Ritmo’ (Bad Boys For Life) – Black Eyed Peas & J Balvin; "Sigues Con Él" – Arcángel & Sech |
| Urban Album of the Year: YHLQMDLG – Bad Bunny; 1 of 1 – Sech; Colores – J Balvin; Nibiru – Ozuna; Papi Juancho – Maluma | Urban/Pop Song of the Year: "Si Me Dices Que Sí" – Reik, Farruko & Camilo; "Honey Boo" – CNCO & Natti Natasha; "Me Gusta" – Shakira & Anuel AA; "Me Quedaré Contigo" – Pitbull & Ne-Yo featuring Lenier & El Micha; "TBT" – Sebastián Yatra, Rauw Alejandro & Manuel Turizo |
Urban/Trap Song of the Year: "Vete" – Bad Bunny; "Bounce" – Cazzu; "Gan-Ga" – Bryant Myers; "Medusa" – Jhay Cortez, Anuel AA & J Balvin; "No Me Ame" – Rvssian, Anuel AA & Juice Wrld

=== Tropical ===
| Tropical Artist of the Year: Romeo Santos; Carlos Vives; Gente De Zona; Gilberto Santa Rosa; Juan Luis Guerra; Marc Anthony; Prince Royce; Silvestre Dangond; Víctor Manuelle; Willie Colón | Tropical Song of the Year: "La Mejor Versión de Mí" – Natti Natasha & Romeo Santos; "Boogaloo Supreme" – Víctor Manuelle & Wisin; "Carita De Inocente" – Prince Royce; "El Carnaval De Celia: A Tribute" – KYEN?ES?; "Lámpara Pa’ Mis Pies" – Juan Luis Guerra; "Lo Que Te Di" – Marc Anthony; "No Te Vayas" – Carlos Vives; "Pa’lante y Pa’tras" – N’Klabe, La Tribu de Abrante & Farina; "Perriando’ (La Murga Remix) -Reykon featuring Willie Colón; "Vallenato Apretao" – Silvestre Dangond |
Tropical Collaboration of the Year: "Nuestro Amor" – Alex Bueno & Romeo Santos; "Boogaloo Supreme" – Víctor Manuelle & Wisin; "Canción Para Rubén" – Carlos Vives & Rubén Blades; "Cartagena" – Fonseca & Silvestre Dangond; "Imaginarme Sin Ti" – Elvis Crespo & Manny Cruz; "La Familia" – Gilberto Santa Rosa & Tito Nieves; "Mi Corazón Es Tuyo" – Olga Tañón & Manny Manuel; "Pa’lante y Pa’tras" – N’Klabe, La Tribu de Abrante & Farina; "Perriando’ (La Murga Remix) -Reykon featuring Willie Colón; "Vallenato Apretao" – Silvestre Dangond featuring Zion y Lennox

=== Regional Mexican ===
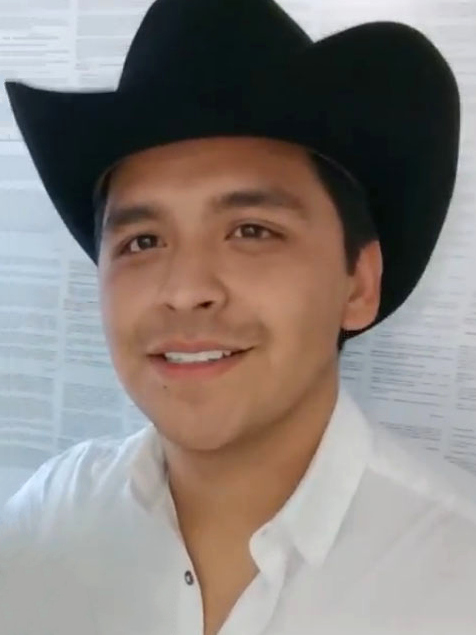
Christian Nodal, Regional Mexican Artist and Regional Mexican "Mariachi/Ranchera" Song winner

| Regional Mexican Artist of the Year: Christian Nodal; Alejandro Fernández; Carín León; Chiquis; El Fantasma; Gerardo Ortíz; Joss Favela; Neto Bernal; Lenin Ramírez; Natanael Cano | Regional Mexican Song of the Year: "Yo Ya No Vuelvo Contigo (En Vivo)" – Lenin Ramírez featuring Grupo Firme; "Amor Tumbao" – Natanael Cano; "Caballero" – Alejandro Fernández; "Dormida" – Edwin Luna y La Trakalosa de Monterrey; "En Eso No Quedamos" – Banda Los Sebastianes; "Escondidos" – La Adictiva San José De Mesillas; "Otra Borrachera" – Gerardo Ortíz; "Se Me Olvidó" – Christian Nodal; "Si Quieres" – Neto Bernal & Carolina Ross; "Solo Tú" – Calibre 50 |
| Regional Mexican Collaboration of the Year: "Yo Ya No Vuelvo Contigo (En Vivo) – Lenin Ramírez featuring Grupo Firme; "No Es Que Me Gustes" – Luis Coronel & La Séptima Banda; "Qué Maldición" – Banda MS de Sergio Lizárraga & Snoop Dogg; "Si Quieres" – Neto Bernal & Carolina Ross; "Y La Hice Llorar" – Los Ángeles Azules featuring Abel Pintos | Regional Mexican Group or Duo of the Year: Grupo Firme; Banda MS de Sergio Lizárraga; Calibre 50; Edwin Luna y La Trakalosa de Monterrey; Los Ángeles Azules |
| Regional Mexican "Sierreño" Song of the Year: "El Güero" – Marca MP; "Con Tus Besos" – Eslabon Armado; "El Muchacho Alegre" – Fuerza Regida; "En Boca de Todos" – T3r Elemento; "Tú" – Carín León | Regional Mexican Band Song of the Year: "Yo Ya No Vuelvo Contigo’ (En Vivo) – Lenin Ramírez featuring Grupo Firme; "Dormida" – Edwin Luna y La Trakalosa de Monterrey; "En Eso Quedamos" – Banda Los Sebastianes; "Escondidos" – La Adictiva Banda San José de Mesillas; "Esta Vez Soy Yo" – Banda Carnaval |
| Regional Mexican "Mariachi/Ranchera" Song of the Year: "Se Me Olvidó" – Christian Nodal; "Caballero" – Alejandro Fernández; "Claro y Obvio" – Joss Favela; "Dile" – Jary Franco; "Si Quieres" – Neto Bernal & Carolina Ross | Regional Mexican Northern Song of the Year: "El Envidioso" – Los Dos Carnales; "En Honor A Ti" – La Maquinaria Norteña featuring Grupo Firme; "Más Te Recuerdo" – Julión Álvarez; "Otra Borrachera" – Gerardo Ortíz; "Solo Tú" – Calibre 50 |

=== Special Merit Awards ===
- Trajectory Award: Gloria Trevi
- Musical Legacy Award: Los Ángeles Azules
- Excellence Award: Wisin
