= Diosa =

2020 song by Myke Towers

- Cover of Remix version

Single by Myke Towers

from the album Easy Money Baby
- Language: Spanish
- English title: Goddess
- Released: February 5, 2020 (original); October 28, 2020 (remix)
- Genre: Reggaeton
- Length: 3:35 (original); 4:20 (remix)
- Label: White World Music
- Producer: Fara

Myke Towers singles chronology
"Relación Rota" (2020)	"Diosa" (2020)	"Tú" (2020)

Anuel AA singles chronology
"Reloj" (2020)	"Diosa (remix)" (2020)	"Los Dioses" (2021)

Natti Natasha singles chronology
"Que Mal Te Fue (remix)" (2020)	"Diosa (remix)" (2020)	"Ayer Me Llamó Mi Ex (remix)" (2020)

Music video
- "Diosa" on YouTube

"Diosa" is a song by Puerto Rican rapper and singer Myke Towers. It was released by White World Music on February 5, 2020, as the third single from his second studio album Easy Money Baby. The song was written by Myke Towers and produced by Fara. On October 28, 2020, a remix of the song with the participation of Puerto Rican rapper Anuel AA and Dominican singer Natti Natasha was released as a single for digital download and streaming. On Christmas Day of 2021, Natti Natasha performed a medley of "Diosa (remix)", which was part of her live album Regalo de Madre (2021).

== Background ==
On January 24, 2020, Myke Towers released his second studio album Easy Money Baby, and "Diosa" was included as the fifth track. At the same day, an audio visualizer of the song was uploaded to YouTube along with the other song visualizers that appeared on the album. Later, Myke Towers announced a remix version for the song on Alex Sensation's concert. On October 28, 2020, the official remix of the song with Anuel AA and Natti Natasha was released as a single.

== Music video ==
The music video for "Diosa" was released on February 5, 2020, in Myke Towers' Youtube channel and reached more than 482 million views. On October 28, 2020, an official music video for the remix was also released at the same day the song came out, which was directed by Marlon P and reached more than 100 million views.

== Charts ==
Chart performance for "Diosa"
Chart (2020)	Peak position
Argentina Hot 100 (Billboard)	14
Costa Rica (Monitor Latino)	6
Dominican Republic (Monitor Latino)	3
Global 200 (Billboard) Remix version	135
Guatemala (Monitor Latino)	1
Honduras (Monitor Latino)	2
Mexico (Billboard Mexican Airplay)	36
Nicaragua (Monitor Latino)	1
Panama (Monitor Latino)	1
Peru (Monitor Latino)	1
Spain (PROMUSICAE)	2
Spain (PROMUSICAE) Remix version	35
US Latin Airplay (Billboard)	19
US Latin Rhythm Airplay (Billboard)	11
US Hot Latin Songs (Billboard)	29

== Certifications ==
Certifications for "Diosa"
Region	Certification	Certified units/sales
Spain (PROMUSICAE)	3× Platinum	180,000^{‡}
Spain (PROMUSICAE) Remix version	Gold	30,000^{‡}
United States (RIAA)	7× Platinum (Latin)	420,000^{‡}
United States (RIAA) Remix version	Gold (Latin)	30,000^{‡}
^{‡} Sales+streaming figures based on certification alone.
