= Papi Juancho =

Studio album by Maluma
- Released: 21 August 2020
- Length: 73:30
- Language: Spanish
- Label: Sony Latin
- Producer: Rude Boyz

Maluma chronology
11:11 (2019)	Papi Juancho (2020)	Marry Me (2022)

Singles from Papi Juancho
- 1. "ADMV" Released: 23 April 2020; 2. "Hawái" Released: 29 July 2020; 3. "Parce" Released: 21 August 2020; 4. "Madrid" Released: 23 October 2020

Papi Juancho is the fifth studio album by Colombian singer-songwriter Maluma. It was surprise-released on 21 August 2020 by Sony Music Latin. The album features guest appearances from Randy, Yandel, Yomo, Lenny Tavárez, Justin Quiles, Ñengo Flow, Jory Boy, Ñejo & Dalmata, and Darell, and was supported by the singles "ADMV", "Hawái" and "Parce". The album is supported by the Papi Juancho Tour, with concerts starting in September 2021.

The album debuted at number 34 on the US Billboard 200 and number 2 on the Top Latin Albums chart with first week sales of 16,000.

== Track listing ==
Standard edition
No.	Title	Writer(s)	Length
1.	"Medallo City"	Juan Londoño; Kevin Jiménez; Bryan Lezcano; Teo Grajales	3:53
2.	"Bella-K" (with Zion featuring Randy)	Londoño; Jiménez; Lezcano; Andrés Uribe; Randy Ortiz; Félix Torres	3:43
3.	"Hawái"	Londoño; Jiménez; Lezcano; Édgar Barerra; Uribe; Kevyn Cruz; Juan Vargas; Miky La Sensa; René Cano; Johan Espinosa	3:19
4.	"Cielo a un Diablo"	Londoño; Jiménez; Lezcano; Cruz; Vargas	3:25
5.	"Perdón" (featuring Yandel)	Londoño; Jiménez; Lezcano; Cruz; Vargas; Llandel Malavé	3:00
6.	"La Cura"	Londoño; Jiménez; Lezcano; Alejandro Suárez	2:56
7.	"Luz Verde"	Londoño; Giencarlos Rivera; Jonathan Rivera	3:03
8.	"Cuidau" (featuring Yomo)	Londoño; Jiménez; Lezcano; La Sensa; Victor Cruz; Jose Torres	3:33
9.	"Parce" (featuring Lenny Tavárez and Justin Quiles)	Londoño; Jiménez; Lezcano; Uribe; Julio Távarez; Justin Quiles; Cristian Salazar	4:08
10.	"Viento" (Interlude)	Londoño; Jiménez; Lezcano	2:42
11.	"Madrid" (with Myke Towers)	Londoño; Jiménez; Lezcano; Barerra; Michael Torres	3:18
12.	"Salida de Escape"	Londoño; Alejandro Correa; Salomón Hoyos	3:04
13.	"Ansiedad"	Londoño; Jiménez; Lezcano	3:40
14.	"Mai Mai" (featuring Ñengo Flow and Jory Boy)	Londoño; Jiménez; Lezcano; La Sensa; Edwin Laureano; Fernando Sierra	3:57
15.	"Vete Vete" (featuring Ñejo and Dalmata)	Londoño; Jiménez; Lezcano; Carlos Crespo; Fernando Mangual	4:03
16.	"Me Acuerdo de Ti" (featuring Darell)	Londoño; Jiménez; Lezcano; Barerra; Osval Castro; Luis Suarez	3:43
17.	"Boy Toy"	Londoño; Vincente Barco; Mateo Cano	3:15
18.	"Booty"	Londoño; Jiménez; Lezcano	2:37
19.	"Quality"	Londoño; Barerra; Johnattan Gaviria; Yhoan Jimenez	2:41
20.	"Copas de Vino"	Londoño; Jiménez; Lezcano	3:12
Total length:			67:12

Bonus tracks
No.	Title	Writer(s)	Length
21.	"ADMV"	Londoño; Barerra; Barco; Stiven Rojas	3:13
22.	"ADMV" (Versión Urbana)	Londoño; Barerra; Barco; Rojas	3:05
Total length:			73:30

== Personnel ==
Credits adapted from Tidal.

- The Rude Boyz - production (1–6, 8–11, 13–16, 18, 20)
- Édgar Barerra - production (19, 21, 22)
- Keityn - production (3, 4)
- Ily Wonder - production (3, 9)
- Nyal - production (12, 22)
- Teo Grajales - production (1)
- Jowan - production (3)
- Alejandro Suárez - production (6)
- Madmusick - production (7)
- Lil Geniuz - production (16)
- Yanyo the Secret Panda - production (16)
- Tezzel - production (17)
- The Prodigiez - production (19)

== Charts ==
=== Weekly charts ===
Chart performance for Papi Juancho
Chart (2020)	Peak position
Belgian Albums (Ultratop Wallonia)	152
Canadian Albums (Billboard)	47
French Albums (SNEP)	132
Italian Albums (FIMI)	48
Spanish Albums (PROMUSICAE)	2
Swiss Albums (Schweizer Hitparade)	22
US Billboard 200	34
US Top Latin Albums (Billboard)	2
US Latin Rhythm Albums (Billboard)	2

=== Year-end charts ===
Year-end chart performance for Papi Juancho
Chart (2020)	Position
Spanish Albums (PROMUSICAE)	46
US Top Latin Albums (Billboard)	28
Chart (2021)	Position
Spanish Albums (PROMUSICAE)	69
US Top Latin Albums (Billboard)	8

== Certifications ==
Certifications for Papi Juancho
Region	Certification	Certified units/sales
Brazil (Pro-Música Brasil)	Platinum	40,000^{‡}
Mexico (AMPROFON)	4× Platinum	240,000^{‡}
Spain (PROMUSICAE)	Gold	20,000^{‡}
Switzerland (IFPI Switzerland)	Gold	10,000^{‡}
United States (RIAA)	12× Platinum (Latin)	720,000^{‡}
^{‡} Sales+streaming figures based on certification alone.
