= Easy Money Baby =

2020 studio album by Myke Towers

Studio album by Myke Towers
- Released: January 24, 2020
- Length: 55:32
- Labels: One World; Casablanca
- Producers: Smash David; JW Lucas; LosTheProducer; Nely; The Rudeboyz; DJ Syke45; Montana the Producer; Fly TwilightZone; OreooBeatzzz; YannC; Z3N; Tainy; Haze; Ily Wonder; Santana the Golden Boy; Misael de la Cruz; Kyle Stemberger

Myke Towers chronology
El Final de Principio (2016)	Easy Money Baby (2020)	Like Myke (2021)

Singles from Easy Money Baby
- 1. "Si Se Da" Released: February 26, 2019; 2. "La Playa" Released: April 9, 2019; 3. "Piensan" Released: September 13, 2019; 4. "Girl" Released: January 24, 2020; 5. "Diosa" Released: February 4, 2020

Easy Money Baby is the first studio album by Puerto Rican rapper Myke Towers, released on 24 January 2020.

== Artwork ==
The album's artwork features Myke Towers posing with his newborn son, who was born just 20 days before the release of the album.

The title of the album is a tribute to his son and also a phrase he goes by "when everything is going great in my life".

== Track listing ==
Songwriting credits adapted from BMI.

No.	Title	Writer(s)	Producer(s)	Length
1.	"MIB"	Michael Torres; Samuel Jimenez; John Lucas; Orlando Matos; José Reyes; Omar Rivera-Maldonado; Anthony Medina	Smash David; JW Lucas; LosTheProducer	2:14
2.	"Tú"	Torres; Josias de la Cruz; Omar Rivera; Matos; Reyes; Manu Chao	Nely	3:25
3.	"Parcerita"	Torres; Kevin London; Bryan Chaverra; Matos; Reyes; Rivera-Maldonado; Medina	The Rudeboyz	3:27
4.	"Una Noche Más"	Torres; Luc Adim Jeanty; Carlos Reyes; Marcos Perez; Franklin Martinez; Matos; Reyes; Rivera-Maldonado; Medina	DJ Syke45	3:26
5.	"Si Se Da" (with Farruko)	Torres; Alberto Lozada-Algarin; Marcos Perez; Martinez; Matos; Reyes; Rivera-Maldonado	Montana the Producer	3:52
6.	"Fugaz"	Torres; Kevin Louzau; Matos; Reyes; Rivera-Maldonado; Medina	Fly TwilightZone	2:58
7.	"LVCC"	Torres; Jonathan Gonzalez; Matos; Reyes; Rivera-Maldonado; Medina	OreooBeatzzz	2:22
8.	"La Playa"	Torres; Jean Carlos Hernandez-Espinell; Matos; Reyes	YannC	3:26
9.	"Relación Rota"	Torres; Jimenez; Juan Guerrieri-Maril; Matos; Reyes; Rivera-Maldonado; Medina	Smash David; Z3N	2:40
10.	"Girl"			3:06
11.	"Viral"	Torres; Marcos Masís; Matos; Reyes; Rivera-Maldonado; Medina	Tainy	2:43
12.	"Diosa"	Torres; Matos; Reyes; Rivera-Maldonado; Medina		3:34
13.	"Hechizo"	Torres; Jimenez; Guerrieri-Maril; Matos; Reyes; Rivera-Maldonado; Medina	Smash David; Z3N	2:25
14.	"Piensan"	Torres; Egbert Rosa; Matos; Reyes; Rivera-Maldonado	Haze	3:02
15.	"Tiene Que Saber"	Torres; London; Chaverra; Andrés Uribe; Matos; Reyes; Rivera-Maldonado; Medina	The Rudeboyz; Ily Wonder	3:01
16.	"Otro"	Torres; Sharon Ramirez; Matos; Reyes; Rivera-Maldonado; Medina	Santana the Golden Boy	3:46
17.	"Ronca"	Torres; Misael de la Cruz Reynoso; Orlando; Reyes; Rivera-Maldonado; Medina	Misael de la Cruz; Kyle Stemberger	2:30
18.	"Funeral"	Torres; Lozada-Algarin; Christian Perez; Matos; Reyes; Rivera-Maldonado; Medina	Montana the Producer	3:34
Total length:				55:32

Notes

- ^{^[a]} signifies an uncredited co-producer

== Charts ==
=== Weekly charts ===
Weekly chart performance for Easy Money Baby
Chart (2020)	Peak position
Spanish Albums (Promusicae)	15
Spanish Streaming Albums (PROMUSICAE)	1
US Billboard 200	55
US Top Latin Albums (Billboard)	1
US Latin Rhythm Albums (Billboard)	1
US Independent Albums (Billboard)	4

=== Year-end charts ===
Year-end chart performance for Easy Money Baby
Chart (2020)	Position
Spanish Albums (PROMUSICAE)	24
US Top Latin Albums (Billboard)	11
Chart (2021)	Position
Spanish Albums (PROMUSICAE)	24
US Top Latin Albums (Billboard)	20
Chart (2022)	Position
Spanish Albums (PROMUSICAE)	29

== Certifications and sales ==
Certifications for Easy Money Baby
Region	Certification	Certified units/sales
Spain (Promusicae)	Platinum	40,000^{‡}
United States (RIAA)	3× Platinum (Latin)	180,000^{‡}
^{‡} Sales+streaming figures based on certification alone.
