= Del Mar (song) =

2020 song by Ozuna, Doja Cat and Sia

Single by Ozuna, Doja Cat and Sia

from the album ENOC
- Language: Spanish; English
- English title: Of the Sea
- Released: October 9, 2020
- Genre: Reggaeton; afrobeats
- Length: 3:34
- Songwriters: Juan Carlos Ozuna; Sia Furler; Amala Dlamini; Yazid Antonio Rivera; Starlin Rivas Rivera; Jose Cotto; José Aponte Santi; Jesse Shatkin; Eli Xavier Vargas; Donny Flores; Alexis Gotay
- Producers: LegazzyYazid; Hi Music Hi Flow; Hyde "El Verdadero Quimico"

Ozuna singles chronology
"Despeinada" (2020)	"Del Mar" (2020)	"No Drama" (2020)

Doja Cat singles chronology
"Do It" (remix) (2020)	"Del Mar" (2020)	"Baby, I'm Jealous" (2020)

Sia singles chronology
"Cold" (2020)	"Del Mar" (2020)	"Hey Boy" (2020)

"Del Mar" (Latin American Spanish: [del ˈmaɾ]; transl. "Of the Sea") is a song by Puerto Rican singer Ozuna, American rapper and singer Doja Cat and Australian singer-songwriter Sia. The track was released as part of Ozuna's fourth studio album ENOC on September 4, 2020, and was later sent to radio as the album's sixth single in October 2020. Over a reggaeton instrumental, the singers perform in verses which alternate between Spanish and English. It was the first-ever Spanish language song and collaboration for both Sia and Doja Cat.

== Background and release ==
The song was first mentioned by Sia in an August 2020 interview with Open House Party; she stated that she had a collaboration lined up with Ozuna and Doja Cat. In an interview with Billboard, Ozuna revealed that Doja Cat and Sia sent him their vocals for the track in less than 24 hours of him asking, and allowed him to do with them what he wished. "Del Mar" was released on September 4, 2020, with no prior announcement, as part of Ozuna's album ENOC. In October 2020, the track was released as a single after being serviced to rhythmic radio in the United States.

== Critical reception ==
Jessica Roiz of Billboard described the song as "hip-shaking" and "fantasy-like", while Leila Cobo of the same publication described it as "beautiful" and "island-tinged". Diego Oritz of Rolling Stone also deemed it a "beach bum love song" and wrote that it is a prime example of how "latin trap and hip-hop come together harmoniously with native Caribbean rhythms like dembow, dancehall, soca and reggaeton" on the ENOC record.

== Music video ==
The official music video for "Del Mar", directed by Nuno Gomes, was released on October 15, 2020. It features Ozuna and Doja Cat, as well as Sia in the form of a water nymph hologram, takes place under the sea, and is laden with special effects. Critics noted that the video took inspiration from Atlantis and The Little Mermaid. The video received a nomination for Favorite Music Video at the 2021 Latin American Music Awards.

== Live performances ==
Ozuna promoted the single by performing it on his Tiny Desk Concert with NPR, as well as on Jimmy Kimmel Live! alongside Doja Cat.

== Charts ==
=== Weekly charts ===
Weekly chart performance for "Del Mar"
Chart (2020–2021)	Peak position
Belgium (Ultratip Bubbling Under Wallonia)	11
France (SNEP)	30
Global 200 (Billboard)	101
Mexico (Billboard Mexican Airplay)	2
New Zealand Hot Singles (RMNZ)	36
Portugal (AFP)	108
Romania (Airplay 100)	69
Spain (PROMUSICAE)	16
Switzerland (Schweizer Hitparade)	51
US Bubbling Under Hot 100 (Billboard)	20
US Hot Latin Songs (Billboard)	10
US Rhythmic Airplay (Billboard)	34

=== Year-end charts ===
Year-end chart performance for "Del Mar"
Chart (2021)	Position
France (SNEP)	69
Spain (PROMUSICAE)	79

== Certifications ==
Certifications for "Del Mar"
Region	Certification	Certified units/sales
France (SNEP)	Diamond	333,333^{‡}
Italy (FIMI)	Platinum	100,000^{‡}
Mexico (AMPROFON)	Platinum+Gold	90,000^{‡}
Portugal (AFP)	Gold	5,000^{‡}
Spain (PROMUSICAE)	3× Platinum	180,000^{‡}
^{‡} Sales+streaming figures based on certification alone.

== Release history ==
Release dates and formats for "Del Mar"
Region	Date	Format	Label	Ref.
Italy	October 9, 2020	Radio airplay	Sony	
United States	October 13, 2020	Rhythmic radio	The Orchard	
