= ADMV (song) =

Single by Maluma

from the album Papi Juancho
- Language: Spanish
- Released: April 23, 2020
- Length: 3:14
- Label: Sony Music Latin
- Songwriters: Juan Londoño; Stiven Rojas; Vicente Barco; Edgar Barrera
- Producer: Edgar Barrera

Maluma singles chronology
"Qué Chimba" (2020)	"ADMV" (2020)	"Feel the Beat" (2020)

Music video
- "ADMV" on YouTube

"ADMV" (short for "Amor de Mi Vida"; English: "Love of My Life") is a song by Colombian singer Maluma. Co-written by Maluma, Stiven Rojas, Vicente Barco, and Edgar Barrera, the lattermost of whom also produced the song, it was released by Sony Music Latin on April 23, 2020. The song topped the charts in Colombia, Costa Rica, Guatemala, Chile, Panama, Paraguay, Mexico, and the Dominican Republic; it also reached the top ten in Puerto Rico, El Salvador, Honduras, Uruguay and, Venezuela.

== Background and composition ==
Maluma teased the song on his Instagram account on 17 April 2020, as well as a sneak peek of the music video. Maluma stated that "ADMV" was written during a trip to Jamaica. The song depicts "a man who lives out his life with the love of his life", and it has been described as a "stripped-down, acoustic ballad". Regarding its lyrics, Maluma stated: "I'm single right now, but [...] of course I dream about [...] when I get old with someone and live different things". On May 18, 2020, Maluma released an "urban version" of the song, titled "ADMV (Versión Urbana)", which incorporates a "reggaetón beat".

== Music video ==
The Nuno Gomes-directed music video was released on April 23, 2020. It depicts Maluma as a hopelessly-in-love elderly man.

== Live performances ==
Maluma performed "ADMV" on the April 30, 2020 episode of The Tonight Show Starring Jimmy Fallon. In June, he performed it during the digital commencement event Dear Class of 2020.

== Charts ==
=== Weekly charts ===
Weekly chart performance for "ADMV"
Chart (2020)	Peak position
Global 200 (Billboard)	165
Argentina Hot 100 (Billboard)	33
Bolivia (Monitor Latino)	12
Chile (Monitor Latino)	1
Colombia (National-Report)	1
Costa Rica (Monitor Latino)	1
Dominican Republic (Monitor Latino)	1
El Salvador (Monitor Latino)	6
Guatemala (Monitor Latino)	1
Honduras (Monitor Latino)	2
Mexico Airplay (Billboard)	1
Panama (Monitor Latino)	1
Paraguay (Monitor Latino)	1
Puerto Rico (Monitor Latino)	2
Spain (PROMUSICAE)	52
Uruguay (Monitor Latino)	7
US Hot Latin Songs (Billboard)	14
US Latin Airplay (Billboard)	1
US Latin Pop Airplay (Billboard)	1
Venezuela (Monitor Latino)	5

=== Year-end charts ===
Year-end chart performance for "ADMV"
Chart (2020)	Position
Argentina Airplay (Monitor Latino)	34
Bolivia Airplay (Monitor Latino)	34
Chile Airplay (Monitor Latino)	55
Colombia Airplay (Monitor Latino)	13
Colombia Streaming (Monitor Latino)	17
Costa Rica Airplay (Monitor Latino)	7
Costa Rica Streaming (Monitor Latino)	7
Dominican Republic Airplay (Monitor Latino)	5
Dominican Republic Streaming (Monitor Latino)	11
Ecuador Airplay (Monitor Latino)	24
Ecuador Streaming (Monitor Latino)	14
El Salvador Airplay (Monitor Latino)	67
El Salvador Streaming (Monitor Latino)	74
Guatemala Airplay (Monitor Latino)	69
Guatemala Streaming (Monitor Latino)	59
Honduras Airplay (Monitor Latino)	38
Latin America Airplay (Monitor Latino)	12
Latin America Streaming (Monitor Latino)	8
Mexico Airplay (Monitor Latino)	61
Mexico Streaming (Monitor Latino)	21
Panama Airplay (Monitor Latino)	10
Paraguay Airplay (Monitor Latino)	16
Puerto Rico Airplay (Monitor Latino)	13
Puerto Rico Streaming (Monitor Latino)	5
Uruguay Airplay (Monitor Latino)	44
US Hot Latin Songs (Billboard)	45
US Latin Airplay (Monitor Latino)	80
US Latin Streaming (Monitor Latino)	12

== Certifications ==
Certifications and sales for "ADMV"
Region	Certification	Certified units/sales
Brazil (Pro-Música Brasil)	Platinum	40,000^{‡}
Mexico (AMPROFON)	Diamond+2× Platinum+Gold	450,000^{‡}
Portugal (AFP)	Gold	5,000^{‡}
Spain (Promusicae)	2× Platinum	120,000^{‡}
United States (RIAA)	Gold (Latin)	30,000^{‡}
^{‡} Sales+streaming figures based on certification alone.

== Release history ==
Release dates for "ADMV"
Region	Date	Format	Label	Ref.
Various	April 23, 2020	Digital download; streaming	Sony Latin	

== See also ==
- List of Billboard number-one Latin songs of 2020
