= RD (song) =

Song by Anuel AA and Ozuna

from the album Los Dioses
- Language: Spanish
- Released: January 22, 2021
- Studio: The Hit Factory
- Genre: Latin trap
- Length: 3:18
- Label: Real Hasta la Muerte; Aura Music
- Songwriters: Emmanuel Gazmey Santiago; Jan Carlos Ozuna Rosado; Felix Ozuna; Daniel Echavarría Ovied
- Producer: Ovy on the Drums

Visualizer
- "RD" on YouTube

"RD" (an abbreviation of Republica Dominicana in Spanish, Dominican Republic in English) is a song by Puerto Rican rapper Anuel AA and Puerto Rican rapper and singer Ozuna. It was released through Real Hasta la Muerte and Aura Music as the fifth track from their collaborative studio album, Los Dioses, on January 22, 2021. Anuel AA and Ozuna wrote the song with the Colombian producer Ovy on the Drums, alongside Felix Ozuna.

== Background ==
On January 19, 2021, Anuel AA and Ozuna announced their collaborative album Los Dioses, and "RD" was included as the fifth track. The song was previewed by both artists one day before its release in Los Dioses: El Documental, a documental movie showing the process of making of the album.

== Composition ==
Billboard describes the song as "a sensual trap song about reliving a connection in the Caribbean island". In "RD", Anuel AA and Ozuna are showing their respect for Dominican Republic. While Ozuna is half Dominican, Anuel AA describes the country as "his second home".

== Commercial performance ==
"RD" debuted at number 17 on the Hot Latin Songs chart dated February 6, 2021. On the Billboard Latin Digital Song Sales chart dated February 6, 2021, the song debuted at number 23. In Spain, it debuted at number 31 on the chart dated February 6, 2021.

== Visualizer ==
The song got released on January 22, 2021, with a visualizer uploaded to YouTube along with the other song visualizers that appeared on Los Dioses. It shows both artists dancing. The official visualizer of "RD" has more than 50 million views on YouTube.

== Live performance ==
Anuel AA and Ozuna performed "RD" at the 2021 Premio Lo Nuestro ceremony on February 18, 2021, at American Airlines Arena in Miami, Florida.

== Charts ==
Chart performance for "RD"
Chart (2021)	Peak position
Spain (PROMUSICAE)	31
US Hot Latin Songs (Billboard)	17
US Latin Digital Song Sales (Billboard)	23
