= Nena Buena =

Song by Anuel AA and Ozuna

from the album Los Dioses
- Language: Spanish
- English title: "Good Girl"
- Released: January 22, 2021
- Studio: The Hit Factory
- Genre: Reggaeton
- Length: 3:32
- Label: Real Hasta la Muerte; Aura Music
- Songwriters: Emmanuel Gazmey Santiago; Jan Carlos Ozuna Rosado; Felix Ozuna; Freddy Montalvo; Gabriel Mora Quintero; Jose Carlos Cruz
- Producers: Mikey Tone; Subelo NEO

Visualizer
- "Nena Buena" on YouTube

"Nena Buena" (English: Good Girl) is a song by Puerto Rican rapper Anuel AA and Puerto Rican rapper and singer Ozuna. It was released through Real Hasta la Muerte and Aura Music as the sixth track from their collaborative studio album, Los Dioses, on January 22, 2021. Anuel AA and Ozuna wrote the song with the producer Mikey Tone, alongside Puerto Rican producer duo Subelo NEO and Puerto Rican rapper Mora.

== Background ==
On January 19, 2021, Anuel AA and Ozuna announced their collaborative album Los Dioses, and "Nena Buena" was included as the sixth track.

== Composition ==
Billboard describes the song as a typical reggaeton tune with "hip-shaking and head-bopping trackand". It finds both Anuel and Ozuna singing about a good girl "whose looks are deceiving, but she’s actually mischievous under wraps".

== Commercial performance ==
"Nena Buena" debuted at number 23 on the Hot Latin Songs chart dated February 6, 2024. In Spain, it debuted at number 28 on the chart dated February 6, 2021. It was later given a Gold certification from PROMUSICAE.

== Audio visualizer ==
The song got released on January 22, 2021, with an audio visualizer uploaded to YouTube along with the other song visualizers that appeared on Los Dioses. It shows both artists dancing while on the other side a group of gentlemen are fighting among themselves for a girl.

== Charts ==
Chart performance for "Nena Buena"
Chart (2021)	Peak position
Spain (PROMUSICAE)	28
US Hot Latin Songs (Billboard)	23

== Certifications ==
Certifications and sales for "Nena Buena"
Region	Certification	Certified units/sales
Spain (PROMUSICAE)	Gold	20,000^{‡}
^{‡} Sales+streaming figures based on certification alone.
