= Los Dioses =

2021 studio album by Anuel AA and Ozuna

Studio album by Anuel AA and Ozuna
- Released: January 22, 2021
- Genre: Latin trap; reggaeton
- Length: 42:00
- Language: Spanish
- Label: Real Hasta la Muerte; Aura; Sony Latin
- Producer: Taxz23; DJ Luian; Dynell; EQ el Equalizer; Foreign Teck; FortyOneSix; Hi Flow; Jowny; Legazzy; Lil Geniuz; Mambo Kingz; Misael de la Cruz; Mercader; Mikey Tone; Mvsis; Ovy on the Drums; Pitt Tha Kid; Súbelo Neo; Tainy; Yazid; Yo Poppy

Anuel AA chronology
Emmanuel (2020)	Los Dioses (2021)	Las Leyendas Nunca Mueren (2021)

Ozuna chronology
ENOC (2020)	Los Dioses (2021)	Ozutochi (2022)

Los Dioses is a collaborative studio album by Puerto Rican rappers and singers Anuel AA and Ozuna. It was released on January 22, 2021, by Real Hasta la Muerte, Aura Music and Sony Music Latin. The production on the album was handled by multiple producers including: Tainy, DJ Luian, Ovy on the Drums, Foreign Teck, Súbelo Neo, Mambo Kingz and Mvsis. The pair previously collaborated on several singles, including "China", "Adicto", "Brindemos" and "Cambio".

The album received generally positive reviews from music critics and was a commercial success. It debuted at number ten on the US Billboard 200 and number one on both the US Top Latin Albums and US Latin Rhythm Albums charts, earning 29,000 album-equivalent units in its first week.

== Critical reception ==
Professional ratings
Review scores
Source	Rating
Allmusic	3/5 stars
NME	4/5 stars
Pitchfork	6.9/10
Rolling Stone	2.5/5 stars

Kyann-Sian Williams of NME praises the collaboration of Anuel AA and Ozuna, calling the collaboration "the coming together of two musical titans". Williams spoke on how the smooth sultry vocals of Ozuna and the deep smoky vocals of Anuel AA coming together with music that transcends the reggaeton genre. She said "Ozuna and Anuel AA have penned hits deeply imbued with timeless grooves that rival those of the biggest stars in the world right now". She also said "With a worldly shimmer and energetic drumming, this is an aching reminder us of the partying days that many of us are still missing." Ultimately, Williams gave the album a rating of 4 stars out of 5.

== Commercial performance ==
Los Dioses debuted at number one on the US Top Latin Albums chart, earning 29,000 album-equivalent units (including 6,000 copies as pure album sales) in its first week, according to MRC Data. This became Anuel AA's third number one and Ozuna's fifth on the chart. The album also debuted at number ten on the US Billboard 200 and US Latin Rhythm Albums charts respectively. In addition, the album accumulated a total of 34.4 million on-demand streams for its songs.

All twelve songs from the album debuted on the US Hot Latin Songs chart, with two songs charting in the top ten. "Antes" debuted at number five and "Los Dioses" debuted at number eight on the chart respectively.

== Track listing ==
No.	Title	Writer(s)	Producer(s)	Length
1.	"Los Dioses"	Juan Carlos Rosado; Emmanuel Gazmey; Hainze Arroyo; Felix Ozuna; Christian Adorno; Jesus Vazquez	Lil Geniuz; Yo Poppy; EQ el Equalizer (Note: signifies an uncredited co-producer)	4:38
2.	"100"	Gazmey; Ozuna; Rosado; Jesús Nieves; Marcos Masís	Tainy; Misael de la Cruz; Mvsis	3:35
3.	"Antes"	Eduardo Berrios; Gazmey; Ozuna; Rosado; Starlin Batista; Yazid Lopez	Yazid; Legazzy; Dynell	3:26
4.	"Dime Tú"	Gazmey; Rosado; Marcos Masís	Tainy; Taxz23	2:58
5.	"RD"	Daniel Oviedo; Gazmey; Ozuna; Rosado	Ovy on the Drums	3:18
6.	"Nena Buena"	Gazmey; Ozuna; Freddy Montalvo; Gabriel Mora; Rosado; José Carlos Cruz	Súbelo Neo; Mikey Tone	3:32
7.	"Contra el Mundo"	Edgar Semper; Gazmey; Ozuna; Rosado; Kedin Maysonet; Luian Malavé; Xavier Semper	DJ Luian; Mambo Kingz; Jowny	2:53
8.	"Perreo"	Gazmey; Rosado; Marcos Masís	Tainy; Taxz23	3:18
9.	"Perfecto"	E. Semper; Gazmey; Ozuna; Rosado; Maysonet; Malave; X. Semper	DJ Luian; Mambo Kingz; Jowny	4:16
10.	"La María"	Gazmey; Ozuna; Rosado; Michael Hernandez	Foreign Teck; FortyOneSix; Pitt Tha Kid	3:14
11.	"Nunca"	Gazmey; Ozuna; Rosado; Michael Masís; Misael de la Cruz Reynoso	Misael de la Cruz; Mvsis	3:52
12.	"Municiones"	Rosado; Gazmey; Ozuna; Jose Aponte; Carlos Mercader	Hi Flow; Mercader	2:56
Total length:				42:00

== Charts ==
=== Weekly charts ===
Weekly chart performance for Los Dioses
Chart (2021)	Peak position
Italian Albums (FIMI)	46
Swiss Albums (Schweizer Hitparade)	17
Spanish Albums (PROMUSICAE)	1
US Billboard 200	10
US Top Latin Albums (Billboard)	1
US Latin Rhythm Albums (Billboard)	1

=== Year-end charts ===
Year-end chart performance for Los Dioses
Chart (2021)	Position
Spanish Albums (PROMUSICAE)	29
US Top Latin Albums (Billboard)	30

== Certifications ==
Certifications for Los Dioses
Region	Certification	Certified units/sales
Spain (Promusicae)	Gold	20,000^{‡}
^{‡} Sales+streaming figures based on certification alone.

== See also ==
- 2021 in Latin music
- List of number-one Billboard Latin Albums from the 2020s
