= Dime Tú =

Song by Anuel AA and Ozuna

from the album Los Dioses
- Released: February 26, 2021
- Studio: The Hit Factory
- Genre: Reggaeton
- Length: 2:58
- Label: Real Hasta la Muerte; Aura Music
- Songwriters: Emmanuel Gazmey; Juan Carlos Ozuna Rosado; Marcos Masis
- Producer: Tainy

Music video
- "Dime Tú" on YouTube

"Dime Tú" is a song by Puerto Rican rapper Anuel AA and Puerto Rican singer Ozuna, released on February 26, 2021 as a track on their collaborative album Los Dioses, by Real Hasta la Muerte and Aura Music.

== Background and release ==
On January 19, 2021, Anuel AA and Ozuna announced their collaborative album Los Dioses, and "Dime Tú" was included as the fourth track. The song got released on January 22, 2021, with an audio visualizer uploaded to YouTube along with the other song visualizers that appeared on Los Dioses.

== Composition ==
The song was written by Anuel AA, Ozuna and Tainy, and produced by Tainy. It is a typical reggaeton tune and finds both Anuel and Ozuna singing about a girl who is playing hard to get. Anuel AA described it as "sometimes it sounds like a single singer".

== Music video ==
The video of "Dime Tú" was released on February 26, 2021, one month after the release of the song, in Anuel AA's YouTube channel and has garnered over 79 million views. It was filmed in Puerto Rico and directed by Fernando Lugo. This was Anuel AA's first filmed music video in his homeland Puerto Rico after his stay in prison.

== Charts ==
| Chart (2021) | Peak position |
|---|---|
| Spain (Promusicae) | 50 |
| US Hot Latin Songs (Billboard) | 27 |
