= Los Dioses (song) =

Song by Anuel AA and Ozuna

from the album Los Dioses
- Released: January 21, 2021
- Recorded: 2020
- Genre: Latin trap
- Length: 4:38
- Songwriters: Emmanuel Gazmey; Juan Ozuna; Jesús Vázquez
- Producers: Lil Geniuz; Yo Poppy

Music video
- "Los Dioses" on YouTube

"Los Dioses" is a song by Puerto Rican rapper Anuel AA and Puerto Rican singer Ozuna, released on January 21, 2021, a day before the release of their collaborative album of the same name. It was released by Real Hasta la Muerte and Aura Music.

== Music video ==
The video of "Los Dioses" was released in Anuel AA's YouTube channel on January 21, the same day the song was released. It was filmed in Miami and directed by Fernando Lugo. It kicks off with a sample of the theme for professional wrestler John Cena, before transitioning into a melodic trap record as sleek as unreleased Bugatti and Lamborghini from far in the future.

== Charts ==
Chart (2021)	Peak position
Spain (Promusicae)	10
US Hot Latin Songs (Billboard)	8
US Latin Airplay (Billboard)	8
US Latin Rhythm Airplay (Billboard)	13
Global 200 (Billboard)	92

== Certifications ==
Region	Certification	Certified units/sales
Spain (Promusicae)	Gold	20,000^{‡}
^{‡} Sales+streaming figures based on certification alone.
