= Antes (song) =

Song by Anuel AA and Ozuna

from the album Los Dioses
- Released: January 22, 2021
- Genre: Reggaeton
- Length: 3:26
- Songwriters: Emmanuel Gazmey; Juan Carlos Ozuna Rosado; Starlin Rivas Batista; Yazid Rivera López; Eduardo Alfonso Vargas Berrios; Frabian Eli; Feliz Ozuna
- Producers: Yazid; Legazzy; Dynell

Music video
- "Antes" on YouTube

"Antes" is a song by Puerto Rican rapper Anuel AA and Puerto Rican singer Ozuna, released in January 2022 as a track from their collaborative album Los Dioses. A music video was released on the same day.

== Background ==
Ozuna previewed firstly the song in September in an Instagram live. In January, 2021, he posted an official preview of the single. Later the preview leaked got copyrighted on YouTube claiming that Anuel AA is the other artist in the song.

== Music video ==
The video of "Antes" was released on 22 January 2021 at the same day they released the album, with the song in Ozuna's YouTube channel. It was filmed in Miami and directed by Fernando Lugo and is about their yearning to meet a beautiful lady they met in the club one more time.

== Live performances ==
Anuel AA and Ozuna performed "Antes" at The Tonight Show Starring Jimmy Fallon on January 29, 2021.

== Charts ==
=== Weekly charts ===
Chart (2021)	Peak position
Argentina Hot 100 (Billboard)	77
Colombia (National-Report)	12
Costa Rica (Monitor Latino)	11
Dominican Republic (Monitor Latino)	14
El Salvador (Monitor Latino)	2
Global 200 (Billboard)	76
Guatemala (Monitor Latino)	3
Honduras (Monitor Latino)	12
Mexico Airplay (Billboard)	16
Mexico Espanol Airplay (Billboard)	10
Panama (Monitor Latino)	3
Paraguay (SGP)	8
Spain (Promusicae)	4
US Billboard Hot 100	100
US Hot Latin Songs (Billboard)	5
US Latin Airplay (Billboard)	22
US Latin Rhythm Airplay (Billboard)	13

=== Year-end charts ===
Chart (2021)	Position
US Hot Latin Songs (Billboard)	70

== Certifications ==
Region	Certification	Certified units/sales
Spain (Promusicae)	Platinum	40,000^{‡}
^{‡} Sales+streaming figures based on certification alone.
