= ENOC (album) =

2020 studio album by Ozuna

Studio album by Ozuna
- Released: September 4, 2020
- Length: 72:04
- Language: Spanish; English
- Label: Aura Music; Sony Latin

Ozuna chronology
Nibiru (2019)	ENOC (2020)	Los Dioses (2021)

Singles from ENOC
- 1. "Caramelo" Released: June 11, 2020; 2. "Despeinada" Released: September 3, 2020; 3. "No Se Da Cuenta" Released: September 23, 2020; 4. "Del Mar" Released: October 9, 2020; 5. "Una Locura" Released: December 18, 2020

ENOC (an acronym for El Negrito Ojos Claros, transl. The Black Kid, Light Eyes) is the fourth studio album by Puerto Rican reggaeton singer Ozuna. It was released through Aura Music and Sony Music Latin on September 4, 2020. The album was supported by six singles: "Caramelo", "Gistro Amarillo", "Enemigos Ocultos", "Despeinada", "No Se Da Cuenta", and "Del Mar". The album's guest features include Myke Towers, Karol G, Daddy Yankee, Doja Cat, Sia, Camilo, and J Balvin.

Professional ratings
Review scores
Source	Rating
Allmusic	3.5/5 stars

== Commercial performance ==
In United States, ENOC debuted at number 17 on the US Billboard 200 and at number one on the Billboard Top Latin Albums chart, with 21,000 album-equivalent units.

== Track listing ==
No.	Title	Writer(s)	Producer(s)	Length
1.	"Enemigos Ocultos" (With Wisin, Myke Towers, Arcángel, Juanka And Cosculluela)	Juan Carlos Ozuna; Rafael Betancourt; Eliezer Vargas Torres; Joel Ismael Vázquez; Austin Santos; Juanka; José Fernando Cosculluela; Juan Luis Morera; Michael Towers; Elijah Sarraga; Eli Xavier Vargad; Marcos A. Ramírez	Los Legendarios	07:26
2.	"Caramelo"	Ozuna; Yazid Antonio Rivera; Vicente Saavedra; Marco Efraín Masís; Alexis Gotay; José Aponte Santi; Eli Xavier Vargas	Tainy; Yazid “El Metálico”; Hi Music Hi Flow; Gotay	03:38
3.	"No Se Da Cuenta" (With Daddy Yankee)	Ozuna; Ramón Luis Ayala; Rivera; Víctor Torres; Ramírez; Gabriel Lebrón; Eli Xavier Vargas; Audberto Duprey	Los Legendarios; Yazid; Los Harmónicos	03:52
4.	"Mala"	Ozuna; Vázquez; Aponte; Jean Carlos Espinell; Alexis Gotay; Felix Ozuna	Hi Music Hi Flow; YannC El Armónico	03:06
5.	"Del Mar" (With Doja Cat And Sia)	Ozuna; Sia Furler; Amala Dlamini; Rivera; Starlin Rivas Rivera; Jose Cotto; Aponte; Jesse Samuel Shatkin; Eli Xavier Vargas; Donny Flores; Alexis Gotay	Legazzy; Yazid; Hi Music Hi Flow; Hyde “El Verdadero Quimico”	03:35
6.	"Sincero"	Ozuna; Andres Jael Correa; Aponte; Torres; Ramírez; Felix Ozuna; Jose Yamil Diaz; Gerald Oscar Jimenez; Alexis Gotay	Los Legendarios; Rio; Hi Music Hi Flow; Dímelo Yama	03:16
7.	"Qué Tú Esperas" (Featuring Zion & Lennox)	Ozuna; Félix G. Ortiz; Gabriel Enrique Pizarro; Eliezer Vargas Torres; Cotto; Rivera; Ramírez; Breton; Aponte; Eli Xavier Vargas; Felix Ozuna; Gotay	Los Legendarios; Hi Music Hi Flow; Hyde	03:42
8.	"Un Get"	Ozuna; Aponte; Joel Ismael Vázquez; Robert Martínez Lebron; Torres; Jaime Cosculluela; Felix Ozuna; Cotto; Christian Linares; Alexis Gotay	Hi Music Hi Flow; Linares; Came Beats	03:32
9.	"Una Locura" (With J Balvin And Chencho Corleone)	Ozuna; José Álvaro Osorio; Aponte; Rivas; Gotay; Orlando Javier Valle; Eli Xavier Vargas; Rivera; Felix Ozuna; Cotto; Christian Linares; Alexis Gotay	Legazzy; Yazid; Hi Music Hi Flow; Hyde	03:51
10.	"A Escondidas"	Ozuna; Correa; Felix Ozuna; Eliezer Vargas Torres; Ramírez; Jimenez	Los Legendarios; Rio	03:21
11.	"Esto No Acaba" (With Nicky Jam)	Ozuna; Nick Rivera; Eliezer Vargas Torres; DJ Nelson; Ramírez; Juan Diego Medina; Eddy Grant	Los Legendarios; DJ Nelson	03:38
12.	"El Reggaetón"	Ozuna; Eliezer Vargas Torres; Ramírez; Correa; Vázquez; Felix Ozuna; Jimenez	Los Legendarios; Rio	03:37
13.	"Despeinada" (With Camilo)	Ozuna; Camilo Echeverry; Alexis Gotay; Eli Xavier Vargas	Legazzy; Yazid; Hi Music Hi Flow	03:45
14.	"Gistro Amarillo" (With Wisin)	Ozuna; Juan Luis Morera; Gotay; Urbani Mota; Luis Jorge Romero	Urba & Rome	03:51
15.	"El Oso Del Dinero"	Ozuna; Aponte; Gotay; Felix Ozuna; Diego Caviedes Franco; Cotto; Rivera	Yazid; Hi Music Hi Flow; Hyde; Kavy Kali	02:38
16.	"No La Mires" (With Jhay Cortez)	Ozuna; Jesus Nieves; Aponte; Gotay; Felix Ozuna; Cotto; Cosculluela; Carlos Mejias; Vázquez	Hi Music Hi Flow; Hyde; Came Beats	03:32
17.	"Duele Querer"	Ozuna; David Aponte; Maximo Domingo Selman; José Ramón Jiménez; Jeanpierre Soto; Felix Ozuna; Jadiel Jesus Nuñez	Yampi; Kronix Magical	02:01
18.	"Caramelo" (Remix With Karol G and Myke Towers)	Ozuna; Michael Towers; Carolina Giraldo; Rivera; Saavedra; Efraín; Eli Xavier Vargas	Legazzy; Tainy; Yazid; Hi Music Hi Flow; Gotay	03:54
19.	"Del Mar" (Solo Version)	Ozuna; Rivera; Starlin Rivas Rivera; Jose Cotto; Aponte; Jesse Samuel Shatkin; Eliezer Vargas Torres; Donny Flores; Eli Xavier Vargas; Alexis Gotay	Legazzy; Yazid; Hi Music Hi Flow; Hyde	03:27
20.	"Gracias"	Ozuna; Aponte; Felix Ozuna; Eli Xavier Vargas; Jimenez; Gotay	Hi Music Hi Flow; Rio	02:42
Total length:				72:05

== Charts ==
=== Weekly charts ===
Chart (2020)	Peak position
Canadian Albums (Billboard)	80
Dutch Albums (Album Top 100)	75
French Albums (SNEP)	172
Italian Albums (FIMI)	16
Spanish Albums (PROMUSICAE)	1
Swiss Albums (Schweizer Hitparade)	23
US Billboard 200	17
US Top Latin Albums (Billboard)	1
US Latin Rhythm Albums (Billboard)	1

=== Year-end charts ===
Chart (2020)	Position
Spanish Albums (PROMUSICAE)	18
US Top Latin Albums (Billboard)	32
Chart (2021)	Position
Spanish Albums (PROMUSICAE)	17
US Top Latin Albums (Billboard)	14
Chart (2022)	Position
Spanish Albums (PROMUSICAE)	51

== Certifications ==
Region	Certification	Certified units/sales
Italy (FIMI)	Gold	25,000^{‡}
Mexico (AMPROFON)	Platinum+Gold	90,000^{‡}
Spain (PROMUSICAE)	Platinum	40,000^{‡}
United States (RIAA)	7× Platinum (Latin)	420,000^{‡}
^{‡} Sales+streaming figures based on certification alone.

== See also ==
- 2020 in Latin music
- List of number-one Billboard Latin Albums from the 2020s
