= Myke Towers =

Puerto Rican rapper (born 1994)

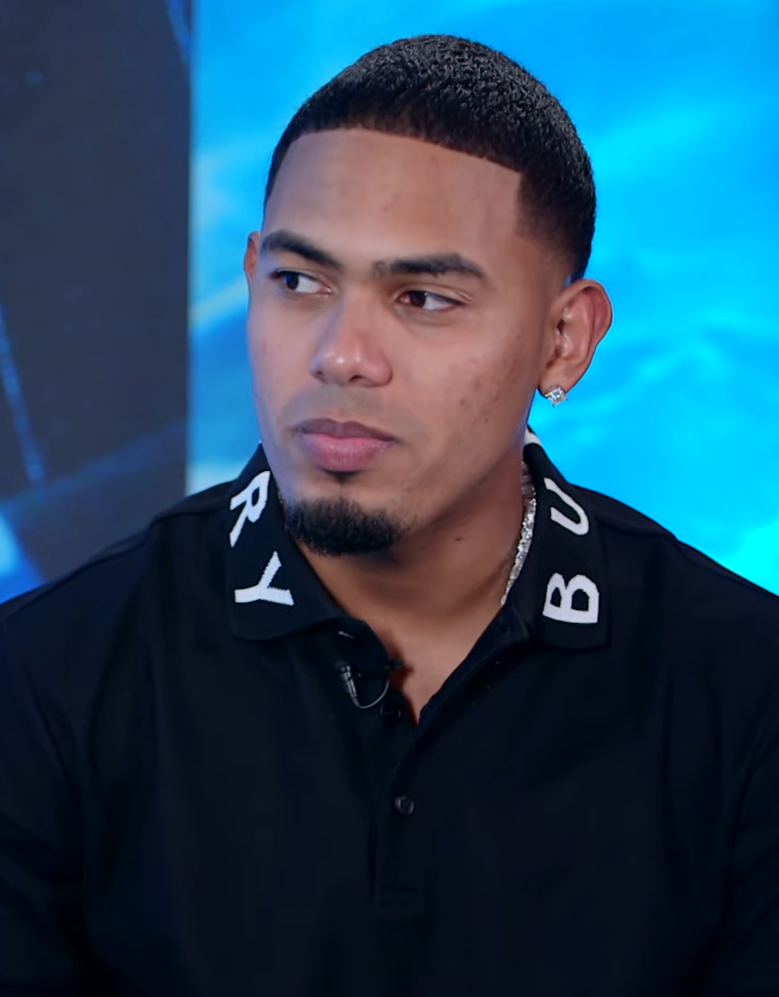
- Towers in 2021

Background information
- Also known as: Young Kingz
- Born: Michael Anthony Torres Monge; January 15, 1994 (age 32); Río Piedras, Puerto Rico
- Genres: Reggaeton; urban pop; Latin trap
- Occupations: Rapper; singer
- Years active: 2016–present
- Labels: White World; One World; Warner Latina; Warner
- Website: myketowerspr.com (in Spanish and English)
- Children: 1

Michael Anthony Torres Monge (born January 15, 1994), known professionally as Myke Towers, is a Puerto Rican rapper and singer. He was recognized as New Artist of the Year by the Billboard Latin Music Awards in 2021 and has been nominated at the Latin Grammys. To date, Towers has released 7 studio albums and is co-managed by One World International and S10 Entertainment.

== Early life ==
Towers was born on January 15, 1994, in Río Piedras, a district that now belongs to San Juan, Puerto Rico. From a very young age he drew inspiration from 90's hip-hop and started practicing freestyle independently, while recording various demos afterwards.

== Career ==
When Towers began his career, he initially posted his songs to SoundCloud, which gained popularity in Puerto Rico. Originally, his stage name was "Mike", but was later stylized to "Myke", joining the letters "Y" and "K", short for the moniker "Young Kingz". His mixtape El Final del Principio (2016) peaked at 12 on Latin Rhythm Albums. The mixtape was produced by the record label G Starr Entertainment and featured singles such as "Dinero en mano", "Déjate ver", "No sabe nada" and "Alternativas".

Towers collaborated with Bad Bunny with the song "Estamos Arriba" released in June 2019. On July 5, 2019, Piso 21 released the single "Una Vida Para Recordar" featuring Towers. He collaborated with Becky G with the song "Dollar"; a music video was released July 12, 2019. His first studio album Easy Money Baby was released on January 23, 2020, just one week after the birth of his son. The album peaked at number one on the Top Latin Albums chart for 83 consecutive weeks and was nominated for Best Urban Music Album at the Latin Grammy Awards. His EP Para Mi Ex was released on December 16, 2020.

His second album, Lyke Mike, was released on April 23, 2021. The title refers to his previous stage name, while the number of tracks (23) pays homage to the jersey number of former basketball player Michael Jordan. It features collaborations with Jon Z, Ñengo Flow, and Sahir.

His third studio album, La Vida Es Una was released on March 23, 2023. This album also had 23 songs, which included features from Arcángel, J Balvin, Chita, Ozuna, and Daddy Yankee. In July 2023, the song "Lala" topped charts in several countries after the use of the song went viral on TikTok. It also became Towers' first song to top Billboard's Global 200 US chart. In that same month, Towers signed a managerial deal with Brandon Silverstein’s S10 Entertainment.

Towers' fourth album, LVEU: Viva la Tuya… No la Mía, was released on November 23, 2023.

His fifth album, La Pantera Negra, was released on August 23, 2024. The album features collaborations with Peso Pluma, Jay Wheeler, Omar Montes, Cosculluela, and Yovngchimi.

== Discography ==
Studio albums

- Easy Money Baby (2020)
- Lyke Mike (2021)
- La Vida Es Una (2023)
- LVEU: Vive la Tuya... No la Mía (2023)
- La Pantera Negra (2024)
- Lyke Miike (2024)
- Island Boyz (2025)

== Awards and nominations ==
Award	Year	Recipient(s) and nominee(s)	Category	Result	Ref.
ASCAP Latin Awards	2020	"Si Se Da" (with Farruko)	Winning Songs	Won	
ASCAP Latin Awards	2021	"La Jeepeta (Remix)" (with Anuel AA, Nio Garcia, Brray & Juanka)	Winning Songs	Won	
ASCAP Latin Awards	2022	Himself	Songwriter of the Year	Won	
ASCAP Latin Awards	2022	"Bandido" (with Juhn)	Winning Songs	Won	
ASCAP Latin Awards	2022	"Diosa"	Winning Songs	Won	
ASCAP Latin Awards	2022	"La Curiosidad" (with Jay Wheeler)	Winning Songs	Won	
ASCAP Latin Awards	2022	"La Nota" (with Manuel Turizo & Rauw Alejandro)	Winning Songs	Won	
ASCAP Latin Awards	2022	"Mi Niña" (with Wisin)	Winning Songs	Won	
ASCAP Latin Awards	2022	"Pareja del Año" (with Sebastián Yatra)	Winning Songs	Won	
ASCAP Latin Awards	2022	"Travesuras (Remix)" (with Nio Garcia, Casper Magico, Ozuna & Wisin & Yandel)	Winning Songs	Won	
ASCAP Latin Awards	2024	"Lala"	Winning Songs	Won	
ASCAP Latin Awards	2024	"Uh Lala" (with Daddy Yankee)	Winning Songs	Won	
Billboard Latin Music Awards	2021	Himself	New Artist of the Year	Won	
Billboard Latin Music Awards	2021	"Caramelo (Remix)" (with Ozuna & Karol G)	Airplay Song of the Year	Nominated	
Billboard Latin Music Awards	2021	"Travesuras (Remix)" (with Nio Garcia, Casper Magico, Ozuna & Wisin & Yandel)	Tropical Song of the Year	Nominated	
Billboard Latin Music Awards	2024	Himself	Latin Rhythm Artist of the Year, Solo	Nominated	
Billboard Latin Music Awards	2024	"Lala"	Global 200 Latin Song of the Year	Nominated	
Billboard Latin Music Awards	2024	"Lala"	Airplay Song of the Year	Nominated	
Billboard Latin Music Awards	2024	"La Falda"	Airplay Song of the Year	Nominated	
Billboard Latin Music Awards	2024	"La Capi"	Tropical Song of the Year	Nominated	
Billboard Music Awards	2021	"Caramelo (Remix)" (with Ozuna & Karol G)	Top Latin Song	Nominated	
iHeartRadio Music Awards	2024	"Lala"	Latin Pop/Reggaeton Song of the Year	Nominated	
iHeartRadio Music Awards	2025	"La Falda"	Latin Pop/Reggaeton Song of the Year	Nominated	
iHeartRadio Music Awards	2025	Himself	Latin Pop/Urban Artist of the Year	Nominated	
iHeartRadio Music Awards	2026	"Degenere" (with Benny Blanco)	Latin Pop/Urban Song of the Year	Nominated	
Latin American Music Awards	2021	Himself	New Artist of the Year	Nominated	
Latin American Music Awards	2021	"Caramelo (Remix)" (with Ozuna & Karol G)	Favorite Urban Song	Nominated	
Latin American Music Awards	2021	"Caramelo (Remix)" (with Ozuna & Karol G)	Collaboration of the Year	Nominated	
Latin American Music Awards	2022	Himself	Artist of the Year	Nominated	
Latin American Music Awards	2022	Himself	Favorite Male Artist	Nominated	
Latin American Music Awards	2022	"Pareja del Año" (with Sebastián Yatra)	Favorite Pop Song	Won	
Latin American Music Awards	2024	"Lala"	Song of the Year	Nominated	
Latin American Music Awards	2024	"Lala"	Global Latin Song of the Year	Nominated	
Latin American Music Awards	2024	"Lala"	Favorite Urban Song	Nominated	
Latin American Music Awards	2024	"Borracho y Loco" (with Yandel)	Best Urban Collaboration	Nominated	
Latin Grammy Awards	2020	Easy Money Baby	Best Urban Music Album	Nominated	
Latin Grammy Awards	2021	Lyke Mike	Best Urban Music Album	Nominated	
Latin Grammy Awards	2021	"La Curiosidad" (with Jay Wheeler)	Best Reggaeton Performance	Nominated	
Latin Grammy Awards	2021	"La Curiosidad" (with Jay Wheeler)	Best Urban Song	Nominated	
Latin Grammy Awards	2024	"El Cielo" (with Feid & Sky Rompiendo)	Best Urban Song	Nominated	
Latin Grammy Awards	2024	"La Falda"	Best Urban Song	Nominated	
LOS40 Music Awards	2021	"Pareja del Año" (with Sebastián Yatra)	Best Latin Song	Nominated	
LOS40 Music Awards	2021	"Pareja del Año" (with Sebastián Yatra)	Best Latin Video	Won	
LOS40 Music Awards	2023	Himself	Best Latin Live Act	Nominated	
LOS40 Music Awards	2023	Himself	Best Latin Urban Act or Producer	Nominated	
LOS40 Music Awards	2023	La Vida es Una	Best Latin Album		
LOS40 Music Awards	2023	"Uh Lala" (with Daddy Yankee)	Best Latin Collaboration	Nominated	
LOS40 Music Awards	2023	"Lala"	Best Latin Urban Song	Nominated	
LOS40 Music Awards	2024	Himself	Best Latin Live Act	Nominated	
LOS40 Music Awards	2024	Himself	Best Latin Urban Act	Won	
LOS40 Music Awards	2024	La Pantera Negra	Best Latin Album	Won	
LOS40 Music Awards	2024	La Vida es Una Tour	Best Latin Tour, Festival or Concert	Nominated	
LOS40 Music Awards	2024	"La Falda"	Best Latin Urban Song	Nominated	
LOS40 Music Awards	2024	"Mi Lova" (with Bad Gyal)	Best Latin Urban Collaboration	Won	
LOS40 Music Awards	2024	"La Ranger" (with Sech, Justin Quiles, Lenny Tavárez, Dalex & Dímelo Flow)	Best Latin Urban Collaboration	Nominated	
LOS40 Music Awards	2025	Himself	Best Latin Act	Nominated	
LOS40 Music Awards	2025	"Soleao" (with Quevedo)	Best Latin Urban Song	Nominated	
LOS40 Music Awards	2025	"Sentimiento Natural" (with Aitana)	Best Spanish Collaboration	Nominated	
MTV Europe Music Awards	2022	Himself	Best Caribbean Act	Nominated	
MTV Europe Music Awards	2023	Himself	Best Caribbean Act	Nominated	
MTV Europe Music Awards	2024	Himself	Best Caribbean Act	Nominated	
MTV Millennial Awards	2021	"La Curiosidad" (with Jay Wheeler)	Hit of the Year	Nominated	
MTV Millennial Awards	2021	"La Nota" (with Manuel Turizo & Rauw Alejandro)	Music-Ship of the Year	Nominated	
MTV Millennial Awards	2021	"Pareja del Año" (with Sebastián Yatra)	Viral Anthem	Won	
MTV Millennial Awards	2024	"La Falda"	Bellakeo Supremo	Nominated	
MTV Millennial Awards	2024	"Lala"	Viral Anthem	Nominated	
Nickelodeon Mexico Kids' Choice Awards	2021	"Pareja del Año" (with Sebastián Yatra)	Catchier Song	Won	
Premios Juventud	2020	Himself	The New Generation - Male	Nominated	
Premios Juventud	2021	Himself	Male Youth Artist of the Year	Nominated	
Premios Juventud	2021	"Caramelo (Remix)" (with Ozuna & Karol G)	The Perfect Mix	Nominated	
Premios Juventud	2021	"Mi Niña (Remix)" (with Wisin, Anitta & Maluma)	The Perfect Mix	Nominated	
Premios Juventud	2021	"Me Gusta" (with Anitta & Cardi B)	OMG Collaboration	Nominated	
Premios Juventud	2021	"La Jeepeta (Remix)" (with Anuel AA, Nio Garcia, Brray & Juanka)	Viral Track of the Year	Nominated	
Premios Juventud	2022	"Pareja del Año" (with Sebastián Yatra)	The Perfect Mix	Nominated	
Premios Juventud	2022	"Oh Na Na" (with Camila Cabello & Tainy)	OMG Collaboration	Nominated	
Premios Juventud	2023	Himself	Male Youth Artist of the Year	Nominated	
Premios Juventud	2023	"Ande Con Quien Ande" (with Jhayco)	Best Urban Mix	Nominated	
Premios Juventud	2023	"Uh Lala" (with Daddy Yankee)	Best Urban Mix	Nominated	
Premios Juventud	2023	La Vida es Una	Best Urban Album – Male	Nominated	
Premios Juventud	2023	"Baby Father 2.0" (with Yovngchimi, Arcangel, Ñengo Flow & Yeruza)	Best Trap Song	Nominated	
Premios Juventud	2024	"Lala"	Best Urban Track	Nominated	
Premios Juventud	2024	"Borracho y Loco" (with Yandel)	Best Urban Mix	Nominated	
Premios Juventud	2024	LVEU: Vive la Tuya... No la Mía	Best Urban Album	Nominated	
Premios Juventud	2025	Himself	Male Youth Artist of the Year	Nominated	
Premios Juventud	2025	Himself	Change Agent	Won	
Premios Juventud	2025	"Degenere" (with Benny Blanco)	Best Urban Track	Nominated	
Premios Juventud	2025	"Adivino" (with Bad Bunny)	Best Urban Mix	Won	
Premios Juventud	2025	La Pantera Negra	Best Urban Album	Nominated	
Premios Juventud	2025	"Soleao" (with Quevedo)	Afrobeat of the Year	Nominated	
Premios Juventud	2026	Himself	Male Youth Artist of the Year	Nominated	
Premios Juventud	2026	"5 Estrellas" (with W Sound & Ovy On The Drums)	Best Urban Mix	Nominated	
Premios Juventud	2026	"Tengo Celos"	Best Urban Rhythmic Song	Nominated	
Premios Juventud	2026	"Topshelf"	Best Urban Trap Song	Nominated	
Premios Juventud	2026	Island Boyz	Best Urban Album	Nominated	
Premios Lo Nuestro	2020	Himself	New Male Artist	Nominated	
Premios Lo Nuestro	2021	"Me Gusta" (with Anitta & Cardi B)	Crossover Collaboration of the Year	Nominated	
Premios Lo Nuestro	2021	"La Jeepeta (Remix)" (with Anuel AA, Nio Garcia, Brray & Juanka)	Remix of the Year	Nominated	
Premios Lo Nuestro	2021	"Caramelo (Remix)" (with Ozuna & Karol G)	Remix of the Year	Nominated	
Premios Lo Nuestro	2021	"La Cama (Remix)" (with Lunay, Ozuna, Chencho Corleone & Rauw Alejandro)	Remix of the Year	Nominated	
Premios Lo Nuestro	2022	Himself	Male Urban Artist of the Year	Nominated	
Premios Lo Nuestro	2022	"La Tóxica (Remix)" (with Farruko, Sech, Jay Wheeler & Tempo)	Remix of the Year	Nominated	
Premios Lo Nuestro	2022	"Fiel (Remix)" (with Wisin, Jhayco & Anuel AA)	Remix of the Year	Nominated	
Premios Lo Nuestro	2022	"Travesuras (Remix)" (with Nio Garcia, Casper Magico, Ozuna & Wisin & Yandel)	Remix of the Year	Nominated	
Premios Lo Nuestro	2022	"Pareja del Año" (with Sebastián Yatra)	Perfect Mix of The Year	Nominated	
Premios Lo Nuestro	2022	"Pareja del Año" (with Sebastián Yatra)	Pop Collaboration of the Year	Won	
Premios Lo Nuestro	2022	"La Nota" (with Manuel Turizo & Rauw Alejandro)	Urban Song of the Year	Nominated	
Premios Lo Nuestro	2022	"Mi Niña" (with Wisin)	Urban Collaboration of the Year	Nominated	
Premios Lo Nuestro	2023	"Oh Na Na" (with Camila Cabello & Tainy)	The Perfect Mix of the Year	Nominated	
Premios Lo Nuestro	2023	Lyke Mike	Urban Album of the Year	Nominated	
Premios Lo Nuestro	2023	"Experimento"	Urban/Pop Song of the Year	Nominated	
Premios Lo Nuestro	2024	Himself	Male Urban Artist of the Year	Nominated	
Premios Lo Nuestro	2024	"Lala"	Song of the Year	Nominated	
Premios Lo Nuestro	2024	"Lala"	Urban Song of the Year	Nominated	
Premios Lo Nuestro	2024	La Vida Es Una	Urban Album of the Year	Nominated	
Premios Lo Nuestro	2024	"Uh Lala" (with Daddy Yankee)	Urban Collaboration of the Year	Nominated	
Premios Lo Nuestro	2025	Himself	Artist of the Year	Nominated	
Premios Lo Nuestro	2025	Himself	Male Urban Artist of the Year	Nominated	
Premios Lo Nuestro	2025	"La Falda"	Song of the Year	Nominated	
Premios Lo Nuestro	2025	"La Falda"	Urban Song of the Year	Nominated	
Premios Lo Nuestro	2025	LVEU: Vive la Tuya... No la Mía	Album of the Year	Nominated	
Premios Lo Nuestro	2025	LVEU: Vive la Tuya... No la Mía	Urban Album of the Year	Nominated	
Premios Lo Nuestro	2025	"Degenere" (with Benny Blanco)	Crossover Collaboration of the Year	Nominated	
Premios Lo Nuestro	2025	"Borracho y Loco" (with Yandel)	Urban Collaboration of the Year	Nominated	
Premios Lo Nuestro	2025	"La Capi"	Tropical Song Of The Year	Nominated	
Premios Lo Nuestro	2026	Himself	Urban Male Artist of the Year	Nominated	
Premios Lo Nuestro	2026	Island Boyz	Album of the Year	Nominated	
Premios Lo Nuestro	2026	Island Boyz	Urban Album of the Year	Nominated	
Premios Lo Nuestro	2026	“Otra Noche” (with Darell)	Song of the Year	Nominated	
Premios Lo Nuestro	2026	“Otra Noche” (with Darell)	Urban Collaboration of the Year	Nominated	
Premios Lo Nuestro	2026	“No Hay Break” (with Omah Lay)	Crossover Collaboration of the Year	Nominated	
Premios Lo Nuestro	2026	“Tengo Celos”	Pop/Urban Song of the Year	Nominated	
Premios Lo Nuestro	2026	“Nueva Era” (with Duki)	Best Urban Trap/Hip-Hop Song of the Year	Nominated	
Premios Lo Nuestro	2026	“Soleao” (with Quevedo)	Urban Song of the Year	Nominated	
Premios Lo Nuestro	2026	“Soleao” (with Quevedo)	AfroBeats of the Year	Won	
