= Sech discography =

- Studio albums: 6
- EPs: 4
- Singles: 74
- Mixtapes: 1

Panamanian singer Sech has released six studio albums including a collaborative album, one mixtape, four extended plays, seventy-four singles as a lead artist, and seven singles as a featured artist.

Sech released his debut album Sueños on April 19, 2019, under the label Rich Music. The album peaked at 81 on the Billboard 200 and 3 on the Top Latin Albums chart and has received 4× Platinum certification from the Recording Industry Association of America for 240,000 sales in the United States. His second album, 1 of 1 was released on May 21, 2020, and reached No. 168 on the Billboard 200 and No. 7 on the Top Latin Albums chart. On April 15, 2021, Sech released his third album 42, which peaked at number 7 on the Top Latin Albums chart. On March 28, 2024, Sech released his fourth studio album The Academy: Segunda Misión with Dímelo Flow, Dalex, Justin Quiles, and Lenny Tavárez. Sech's fifth studio album Tranki, Todo Pasa was released on November 29 of the same year and was his first release under the label Rimas Entertainment. His sixth studio album Secho Gang was released on May 14, 2026.

== Albums ==
=== Studio albums ===
List of studio albums, with selected details, chart positions, and certifications
Title	Details	Peak chart positions				Certifications
Title	Details	US	US Indie	US Latin	SPA	Certifications
Sueños	Released: April 19, 2019; Format: CD, digital download, streaming; Label: Rich Music	81	41	3	—	RIAA: 4× Platinum (Latin)
1 of 1	Released: May 21, 2020; Format: Digital download, streaming; Label: Rich Music	168	21	4	8	RIAA: 3× Platinum (Latin)
42	Released: April 15, 2021; Format: CD, digital download, streaming; Label: Rich Music	—	43	7	6	RIAA: 2× Platinum (Latin); PROMUSICAE: Gold
Tranki, Todo Pasa	Released: November 29, 2024; Format: Digital download, streaming; Label: Rimas Entertainment	—	—	—	18	
Secho Gang	Released: May 14, 2026; Format: Digital download, streaming; Label: Rimas Entertainment	TBA				
"—" denotes items which were not released in that country or failed to chart.

=== Collaborative albums ===
List of studio albums, with selected details and chart positions
Title	Details	Peak chart positions		Certifications
Title	Details	US Latin	SPA	Certifications
The Academy: Segunda Misión (with Dímelo Flow, Dalex, Justin Quiles, and Lenny Tavárez)	Released: March 28, 2024; Label: Rich Music; Format: CD, LP, digital download, streaming	19	3	RIAA: Platinum (Latin)

=== Mixtapes ===
List of mixtapes, with selected details
Title	Details
The Sensation Mixtape	Released: December 5, 2017; Format: Digital download; Label: Rich Music

== Extended plays ==
List of extended plays, with selected details and chart positions
Title	Details	Peak chart positions
Title	Details	SPA
The Sensation	Released: December 6, 2018; Format: Digital download, streaming; Label: Rich Music	97
A Side	Released: April 15, 2020; Format: Digital download, streaming; Label: Rich Music	—
El Bloke Hills	Released: September 21, 2023; Format: Digital download, streaming; Label: Rich Music	32
Esa Noche Terminó de Día	Released: December 11, 2025; Format: Digital download, streaming; Label: Rimas Entertainment	—

=== Collaborative extended plays ===
List of studio albums, with selected details and chart positions
Title	Details	Peak chart positions		Certifications
Title	Details	US Latin	SPA	Certifications
The Academy (with Rich Music and Dalex featuring Justin Quiles, Lenny Tavárez and Feid)	Released: October 11, 2019; Label: Rich Music; Format: CD, LP, digital download, streaming	11	20	RIAA: Platinum (Latin)

== Singles ==
=== As a lead artist ===
Title	Year	Peak chart positions										Certifications	Album
Title	Year	PAN	ARG	COL	FRA	ITA	SPA	SWE	SWI	US	US Latin	Certifications	Album
"Yo Sin Ti"	2014	—	—	—	—	—	—	—	—	—	—		Non-album singles
"Porno Auditiva"	2014	—	—	—	—	—	—	—	—	—	—		Non-album singles
"Mentira Bonita"	2015	—	—	—	—	—	—	—	—	—	—		Non-album singles
"El Error"	2016	—	—	—	—	—	—	—	—	—	—		Non-album singles
"Eso Se"	2016	—	—	—	—	—	—	—	—	—	—		Non-album singles
"My Lova"	2017	—	—	—	—	—	—	—	—	—	—		Non-album singles
"Toco Mentir"	2017	—	—	—	—	—	—	—	—	—	—		Non-album singles
"Mi Linea"	2017	—	—	—	—	—	—	—	—	—	—		Non-album singles
"Tu Pollo" (with Justin Quiles)	2017	—	—	—	—	—	—	—	—	—	—		Non-album singles
"Batta" (featuring Mayeli Vanducci and Da Silva)	2017	—	—	—	—	—	—	—	—	—	—		Non-album singles
"La Otra"	2017	—	—	—	—	—	—	—	—	—	—		Non-album singles
"Imaginate" (with Kaih)	2017	—	—	—	—	—	—	—	—	—	—		Non-album singles
"Miss Lonely" (Note: The solo version of "Miss Lonely" is a stand-alone single while the 2018 Dimelo Flow remix version was included on Sueños.) (solo or remix with Justin Quiles, De La Ghetto, and Dimelo Flow)	2017	—	—	—	—	—	—	—	—	—	—	PROMUSICAE: Gold; RIAA: 2× Platinum (Latin)	Sueños
"5nco"	2017	—	—	—	—	—	—	—	—	—	—		Non-album single
"Con Bochinche"	2017	—	—	—	—	—	—	—	—	—	—		The Sensation Mixtape
"Tu Me Quieres Pa' Ti"	2018	—	—	—	—	—	—	—	—	—	—		Non-album singles
"1AM" (featuring Akim, Yemil, BCA, and Wiz Naziz)	2018	—	—	—	—	—	—	—	—	—	—		Non-album singles
"La Fulana" (featuring Martin Machore)	2018	—	—	—	—	—	—	—	—	—	—		Non-album singles
"Un Like" (featuring Yemil)	2018	—	—	—	—	—	—	—	—	—	—		Non-album singles
"Unplugged Acustico"	2018	—	—	—	—	—	—	—	—	—	—		Non-album singles
"Mintiendo y Enamorado"	2018	—	—	—	—	—	—	—	—	—	—		Non-album singles
"La Esperanza"	2018	—	—	—	—	—	—	—	—	—	—		Non-album singles
"Very Busy"	2018	—	—	—	—	—	—	—	—	—	—		Non-album singles
"Carpe Diem" (featuring Yemil and El Tiex)	2018	—	—	—	—	—	—	—	—	—	—		Non-album singles
"La Serenata" (featuring BCA)	2018	—	—	—	—	—	—	—	—	—	—		Non-album singles
"Me Gustaría" (with Justin Quiles and Jowell & Randy)	2018	—	—	—	—	—	—	—	—	—	—		The Sensation
"Sígueme (Remix)" (with Feid)	2019	—	—	—	—	—	—	—	—	—	—		19
"La Vida"	2019	—	—	—	—	—	—	—	—	—	—		The Sensation
"Solita" (featuring Farruko and Zion & Lennox)	2019	4	—	—	—	—	—	—	—	—	—	RIAA: 5× Platinum (Latin)	Sueños
"Que Más Pues (Remix)" (Note: The original version of "Que Más Pues" is included on The Sensation, while the remix version is included on Sueños.) (with Justin Quiles featuring Maluma, Nicky Jam, Farruko, Dalex and Lenny Tavarez)	2019	—	12	—	—	—	—	—	—	—	—	RIAA: Diamond (Latin)	Sueños
"Otro Trago" (featuring Darell or Ozuna, Anuel AA and Nicky Jam)	2019	1	1	1	176	36	1	96	26	34	1	FIMI: Platinum; PROMUSICAE: 3× Platinum; RIAA: 42× Platinum (Latin)	Sueños
"La Mentira (Remix)" (with Brytiago and Rafa Pabön featuring Myke Towers, Cazzu, and Rauw Alejandro)	2019	—	—	—	—	—	—	—	—	—	—		Non-album singles
"No" (with Milly and Farruko featuring Miky Woodz and Gigolo y La Exce)	2019	—	—	—	—	—	—	—	—	—	48		Non-album singles
"El Favor" (with Dimelo Flow and Nicky Jam featuring Farruko, Zion and Lunay)	2019	—	26	—	—	—	—	—	—	—	21		Non-album singles
"Quizas" (with Dimelo Flow, Dalex, Justin Quiles, Lenny Taváres, Feid, Wisin, and Zion)	2019	19	31	—	—	—	—	—	—	—	41	RIAA: 7× Platinum (Latin)	The Academy
"Si Te Vas" (with Ozuna)	2019	5	15	—	—	—	8	—	—	—	19	RIAA: 11× Platinum (Latin)	1 of 1
"La Isla" (with Dimelo Flow and Dalex featuring Justin Quiles, La Exce, Feid, and Zion)	2019	—	—	—	—	—	—	—	—	—	—		Non-album single
"Sigues Con Él" (with Arcángel and Dimelo Flow)	2019	2	6	—	—	—	16	—	—	78	3	PROMUSICAE: Platinum; RIAA: 8× Platinum (Latin)	Historias de un Capricornio
"Definitivamente" (with Daddy Yankee)	2020	1	43	—	—	—	31	—	—	—	15		Non-album single
"Mejor" (with Dalex)	2020	16	57	—	—	—	—	—	—	—	—		Modo Avión
"Ignorantes" (with Bad Bunny)	2020	3	29	—	—	100	4	—	48	49	3	PROMUSICAE: Platinum; RIAA: 15× Platinum (Latin)	YHLQMDLG
"Ganas de Ti" (with Wisin & Yandel)	2020	2	—	—	—	—	—	—	—	—	49		Non-album single
"Perfume" (with Dalex and Justin Quiles)	2020	—	—	—	—	—	—	—	—	—	—		Modo Avión
"Relación"	2020	1	3	—	—	73	10	—	—	64	2	FIMI: Gold; PROMUSICAE: 2× Platinum; RIAA: 29× Platinum (Latin)	1 of 1
"Fe"	2020	—	—	—	—	—	—	—	—	—	—		1 of 1
"Trofeo"	2020	—	—	—	—	—	—	—	—	—	—		1 of 1
"Fabuloso" (featuring Justin Quiles)	2020	—	37	—	—	—	8	—	—	—	—		1 of 1
"Porfa" (remix) (with Feid, J Balvin, Maluma, Nicky Jam, and Justin Quiles)	2020	—	—	6	—	—	—	—	—	—	11		Bahía Ducati
"Qué Lástima" (with ChocQuibTown)	2020	14	—	—	—	—	—	—	—	—	—		Non-album singles
"Amantes y Amigos" (with Arcángel)	2020	13	—	—	—	—	74	—	—	—	26		Non-album singles
"La Luz" (with J Balvin)	2020	13	—	—	—	—	7	—	—	—	22		Non-album singles
"Girl Like You"(with Dímelo Flow and Tyga featuring J.I the Prince of N.Y)	2021	—	—	—	—	—	—	—	—	—	—		Non-album singles
"911"	2021	4	7	2	—	—	2	—	—	— (Note: "911" did not enter the Billboard Hot 100, but peaked at number five on the Bubbling Under Hot 100 chart.)	9	PROMUSICAE: 3× Platinum; RIAA: 17× Platinum (Latin)	42
"Te Acuerdas"(featuring Arcángel)	2021	—	—	—	—	—	—	—	—	—	—		42
"Sal y Perrea"	2021	1	—	16	—	—	10	—	—	—	14	PROMUSICAE: 2× Platino; RIAA: 9× Platinum (Latin)	42
"Somos Iguales"	2021	—	—	—	—	—	—	—	—	—	—		Non-album singles
"Volando (Remix)" (with Mora and Bad Bunny)	2021	9	29	—	—	—	3	—	—	89	7		Non-album singles
"Se Le Ve" (with Dímelo Flow and Dalex, featuring Justin Quiles, Arcángel, De la Ghetto and Lenny Tavárez)	2021	—	54	—	—	—	92	—	—	—	—	PROMUSICAE: Gold; RIAA: 3× Platinum (Latin)	Always Dream
"Una Nota" (with J Balvin)	2021	18	90	1	—	—	28	—	—	— (Note: "Una Nota" did not enter the Billboard Hot 100, but peaked at number 19 on the Billboard Bubbling Under Hot 100 chart.)	11	PROMUSICAE: Gold	Jose
"Borracho" (with DJ Khaled)	2021	3	—	—	—	—	77	—	—	—	28		Non-album singles
"Desde Mis Ojos (Remix)"	2022	5	—	—	—	—	—	—	—	—	43		Non-album singles
"Noche De Teteo"	2022	15	—	—	—	—	89	—	—	—	—	PROMUSICAE: Gold	Non-album singles
"Llueve"	2022	—	—	—	—	—	92	—	—	—	—		Non-album singles
"Qué Me Contás" (with Dímelo Flow, J Balvin, featuring Justin Quiles and Lenny Tavárez)	2022	—	—	—	—	—	—	—	—	—	—		Always Dream
"Mi Perfume" (with Dímelo Flow)	2022	—	—	—	—	—	—	—	—	—	—		Always Dream
"Dame Break" (with Darell)	2022	—	—	—	—	—	—	—	—	—	—	RIAA: Gold (Latin)	Non-album singles
"En La De Ella" (with Feid and Jhayco)	2022	—	—	—	—	—	20	—	—	—	26		Non-album singles
"La Baby" (with Tainy and Daddy Yankee and Feid)	2023	—	—	—	—	—	36	—	—	—	47		Data
"Cafe Malibú" (with Mora and Saiko)	2023	16	—	—	—	—	13	—	—	—	—		Non-album single
"Toy Perdio"	2024	10	—	—	—	—	—	—	—	—	—		Tranki, Todo Pasa
"Tarde"	2024	—	—	—	—	—	—	—	—	—	—		Tranki, Todo Pasa
"Tus Labios (Remix)" (with Beéle)	2024	—	—	—	—	—	—	—	—	—	—		Tranki, Todo Pasa
"Priti" (with Danny Ocean)	2025	6	72	—	—	—	23	—	—	—	—		Non-album singles
"París" (with Boza)	2025	1	—	—	—	—	—	—	—	—	—		Non-album singles

=== As a featured artist ===
Title	Year	Peak chart positions				Certifications	Album
Title	Year	PAN	ARG	SPA	US Latin	Certifications	Album
"Sin Igual" (Gian Varela featuring Dalex and Sech)	2018	2	—	—	—		Non-album single
"Pa Mi (Remix)" (Dalex featuring Rafa Pabön, Khea, Sech, Cazzu, Feid and Lenny Tavárez)	2019	—	—	—	—	PROMUSICAE: 3× Platinum; RIAA: 19× Platinum (Latin)	Climaxxx
"Cuaderno" (Dalex featuring Nicky Jam, Justin Quiles, Sech, Lenny Tavárez and Rafa Pabön)	2019	—	13	15	47	PROMUSICAE: Platinum; RIAA: Diamond (Latin)	Climaxxx
"Rebota (Remix)" (Guaynaa, Nicky Jam, and Farruko featuring Becky G and Sech)	2019	—	18	24	28	PROMUSICAE: Gold; RIAA: Platinum (Latin)	Non-album single
"Atrévete" (Nicky Jam featuring Sech)	2019	4	26	42	23	PROMUSICAE: Gold	Íntimo
"Elegí (Remix)" (Rauw Alejandro, Dalex and Lenny Tavárez featuring Farruko, Anuel AA, Sech, Dímelo Flow and Justin Quiles)	2020	—	—	61	—		Afrodisíaco
"Para Siempre" Daddy Yankee featuring Sech	2022	—	—	40	24		Legendaddy

== Other charted or certified songs ==
Title	Year	Peak chart positions				Certifications	Album
Title	Year	PAN	ESV	SPA	US Latin	Certifications	Album
"Boomerang"	2019	—	—	80	—	PROMUSICAE: Gold	Sueños
"PSL"	2019	—	—	—	—	PROMUSICAE: Gold	Sueños
"Confía" (with Daddy Yankee)	2020	—	—	33	47		1 of 1
"Bentley" (with Myke Towers)	2020	—	—	89	—		1 of 1
"Wao"	2021	—	20	30	—	PROMUSICAE: Platinum	42
"Tus Lágrimas" (with Mora)	2021	13	—	20	43		Microdosis
"Dañamos la Amistad" (with Karol G)	2023	—	—	70	29		Mañana Será Bonito

=== Guest appearances ===
Title	Year	Other artist(s)	Album
"Sra Pistola (Remix)"	2015	Robinho, Mr. Fox, Calero, Gypson Do It	Innovaando
"No Dice Na"	2015	Murder Cat	El Clickiti
"Baby Si Tu (Remix)"	2016	Klasico, Eddy Lover, Farruko, Ken-Y, Flex	Los Que Gustan
"No Me Olvidas"	2016	Klasico	Los Que Gustan
"Baby Si Tu (Remix)"	2017	Akim	Say This
"El Kbreo de Tu Pollo (Remix)"	2017	RD Maravilla, Real Phantom, Mr. Fox, Robinho	Disparando Pa la Luna
"Atrevida"	2017	Kenai	Ícono
"One Love"	2017	Jdam	No Tienen Level
"Mil Razones"	2017	Azhika	Non-album singles
"Tal para Cual (Remix)"	2017	El Skiz, El Tachi, Tobe Love	Non-album singles
"Sentimientos de Papel"	2017	El Blopa, El Tachi	Soul Rebel, Soul Free
"El Grammy"	2017	Robinho, El Blopa	Non-album single
"El Dealer"	2018	Wiz Naziz, El Combo de Oro	Combo de Oro Hits
"Vente Commigo (Remix)"	2018	Wiz Naziz, BCA, Real Phantom, El Combo de Oro	Combo de Oro Hits
"With U (Remix)"	2018	La Mentalidad, At' Fat, Akim, Blopa, El Tachi	ESTELAR
"Lana Del Rey (Remix)"	2018	At' Fat, David L	Afrobeat, Vol.1
"La Hija de Luna (Remix)"	2018	El Codigo Kirkao, Chamaco, Akim, Boza, El Tachi	Non-album singles
"Puesto pal' Millón (Remix)"	2018	Dalex, Arcángel, Justin Quiles, Dímelo Flow, Alex Rose, Myke Towers	Non-album singles
"Las Istrucciones (Remix)"	2018	Carlitos Rossy, Dalex, Kevin Roldan	The Mansion, Vol.2
"Victoria"	2018	Dalex, Dímelo Flow	La Nueva Ola
"Mojadita"	2019	Choliare	Mi Estilo
"Sin Ti"	2019	Dalex, Miky Woodz	Climaxxx
"Vuelva A Ver (Remix)"	2019	Dalex, Lyanno, Justin Quiles, Rauw Alejandro	Climaxxx
"Como Es [Tom Sawyer Remix]"	2019	Akim, Tom Sawyer	Non-album single
"Cali (Sech Remix)"	2019	Bigstate	Medellin (The Remixes)
"Instinto Natural"	2019	Maluma	11:11
"Quiero Estar Contigo"	2019	El Roockie, Robinho	Non-album singles
"Si Se Da (Remix)"	2019	Myke Towers, Farruko, Arcángel, Zion	Non-album singles
"Cosita"	2019	Valentino, Dalex, Lenny Tavárez	Non-album singles
"Nadie [Remix]"	2019	Farruko, Ozuna, Lunay, Sharo Towers	Non-album singles
"VÁMONOS"	2019	Becky G	Mala Santa
"No Quiere Amor (Remix)"	2019	Kaih	Non-album single
"Yo Tengo una Gata"	2019	Ozuna	Nibiru
"Loco Contigo (Remix)"	2019	DJ Snake, J Balvin, Ozuna, Nicky Jam, Natti Natasha, Darrell	Carte Blanche (Deluxe)
"Gyal a Freaks"	2020	Toby King	Non-album single
"Miradas Raras"	2022	Eladio Carrión	Sauce Boyz 2
"Te Extraño"	2025	Arcángel	La 8va Maravilla
