= Arcángel discography =

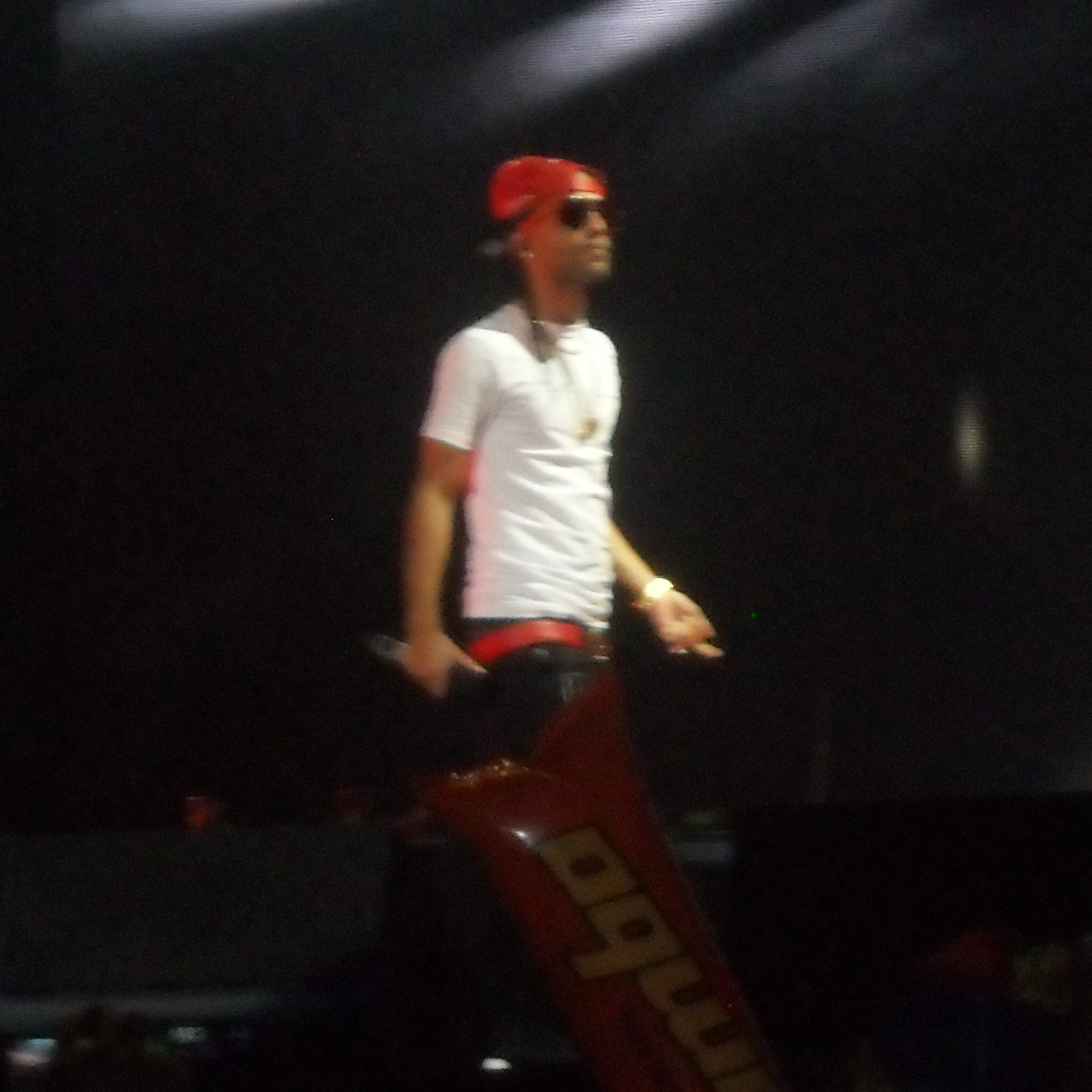
- Arcángel performing in 2013
- Studio albums: 8
- Extended plays: 2
- Compilation albums: 1
- Singles: 18
- Music videos: 9
- Collaborative albums: 1
- Mixtapes: 2

The discography of American singer Arcángel consists of eight major-label studio albums, one collaborative album, one compilation, two mixtapes, two extended plays and 18 singles as lead artist.

In 2004, Arcángel would form a duo alongside De la Ghetto, Arcángel & De la Ghetto, after having interest in becoming a reggaeton performer. Eventually creating hit singles such as "Aparentemente" and "Agresivo", the group would separate in 2007 to pursue solo careers. Soon after, Arcángel planned on releasing an album titled La Maravilla (2008), but was eventually cancelled due to the result of it being leaked. Within the leaked album, "Pa' Que la Pases Bien" eventually received airplay from Latin urban stations in the United States. He would release his debut studio album El Fenómeno in 2008, which includes some tracks from his planned album.

== Albums ==
=== Studio albums ===
List of singles as lead artist, with selected details, chart positions and certifications
Title	Details	Peak chart positions					Certifications (sales thresholds)
Title	Details	US	US Latin	US Latin Rhyt.	US Rap	SPA	Certifications (sales thresholds)
El Fenómeno	Released: December 9, 2008; Label: Machete; Formats: CD, digital download	— (Note: El Fenómeno did not enter the Billboard 200, but peaked at number 10 on the US Heatseekers Albums chart.)	14	3	—	—	
Sentimiento, Elegancia & Maldad	Released: November 19, 2013; Label: Pina; Formats: CD, digital download	98	1	1	—	—	RIAA: Gold (Latin)
Los Favoritos (with DJ Luian)	Released: December 11, 2015; Label: Pina; Formats: CD, digital download	—	2	1	11	—	RIAA: Gold (Latin)
Ares	Released: July 13, 2018; Label: Pina; Formats: CD, digital download	—	5	5	—	74	
Historias de un Capricornio	Released: December 20, 2019; Label: Rimas; Formats: CD, digital download	—	2	2	—	3	RIAA: Platinum (Latin)
Los Favoritos 2	Released: October 16, 2020; Label: Rimas; Formats: Digital download, streaming	—	5	5	—	9	
Los Favoritos 2.5	Released: September 17, 2021; Label: Rimas; Formats: Digital download, streaming	—	15	11	—	33	
Sr. Santos	Released: December 1, 2022; Label: Rimas; Formats: Digital download, streaming	37	3	2	—	10	
Sentimiento, Elegancia y Más Maldad	Released: November 17, 2023; Label: Rimas; Formats: Digital download, streaming	195	10	6	—	13	
Papi Arca	Released: December 19, 2024; Label: Rimas; Formats: Digital download, streaming	—	—	—	—	—	

=== Mixtapes ===
List of mixtapes, with selected details
Title	Details
El Diario de un Soñador	Released: August 28, 2007; Formats: Digital download
The New King	Released: December 25, 2007; Formats: Digital download
Los Metálicos	Released: September 15, 2009; Formats: Digital download
The Problem Child	Released: April 15, 2010; Label: Flow Factory; Formats: Digital download
Optimus A.R.C.A.	Released: October 31, 2010; Label: Flow Factory; Formats: CD, digital download
La Maravilla II	Released: December 21, 2010; Label: Flow Factory; Formats: Digital download

=== Extended plays ===
List of extended plays, with selected details
Title	Details
FloWres (with Fariana)	Released: 22 April 2021; Label: Sony Latin; Formats: Digital download, streaming

== Singles ==
=== As lead artist ===
List of singles as lead artist, with selected chart positions and certifications, showing year released and album name
Title	Year	Peak chart positions					Certifications	Album
Title	Year	US	US Latin	ARG	SPA	WW	Certifications	Album
"Chica Virtual"	2007	—	22	—	—	—		Flow la Discoteka 2
"Pa' Que la Pases Bien"	2008	—	—	—	—	—		El Fenómeno
"Por Amar a Ciegas"	2008	—	35	—	—	—		El Fenómeno
"Ganas de Ti"	2008	—	—	—	—	—		El Fenómeno
"Como Tú Me Tocas"	2009	—	—	—	—	—		Golpe de Estado
"La Velita" (with Ivy Queen, Jadiel and Zion)	2009	—	—	—	—	—		Golpe de Estado
"Mi Voz, Mi Estilo & Mi Flow"	2010	—	—	—	—	—		Optimus A.R.C.A.
"Tengo Dinero"	2010	—	—	—	—	—		Optimus A.R.C.A.
"Panamiur"	2010	—	—	—	—	—		Optimus A.R.C.A.
"Flow Violento"	2012	—	—	—	—	—		La Fórmula
"Me Prefieres a Mí" (remix) (featuring Don Omar)	2012	—	—	—	—	—	RIAA: Platinum (Latin)	La Fórmula
"Ella Me Dice" (with Zion)	2012	—	—	—	—	—		La Fórmula
"Hace Mucho Tiempo"	2013	—	—	—	—	—	RIAA: Platinum (Latin)	Sentimiento, Elegancia & Maldad
"Contigo Quiero Amores"	2013	—	—	—	—	—	RIAA: Gold (Latin)	Sentimiento, Elegancia & Maldad
"Como Tiene Que Ser"	2013	—	—	—	—	—		Sentimiento, Elegancia & Maldad
"Gucci Boys Club"	2013	—	—	—	—	—		Sentimiento, Elegancia & Maldad
"Tu Cuerpo Me Hace Bien" (with DJ Luian)	2015	—	—	—	—	—		Los Favoritos
"50 Sombras de Austin" (with DJ Luian)	2015	—	21	—	—	—	RIAA: Platinum (Latin)	Los Favoritos
"El Granjero"	2018	—	—	—	—	—		Ares
"Austin Baby"	2018	—	—	—	—	—		Non-album singles
"La Cabaña" (with Jay Menez)	2018	—	—	—	—	—		Non-album singles
"Deo a Mi Ex" (with Jaudy)	2018	—	—	—	—	—		Non-album singles
"Zum Zum" (with Daddy Yankee and R.K.M & Ken-Y)	2018	—	20	60	58	—		Non-album singles
"Original" (with Bad Bunny)	2018	—	28	—	82	—	PROMUSICAE: Gold	Ares
"Mi Primer Kilo"	2018	—	—	—	—	—		Ares
"Me Gusta"	2018	—	—	—	—	—		Ares
"Satisfacción" (with Nicky Jam and Bad Bunny)	2018	—	—	—	—	—	AMPROFON: Gold	Non-album singles
"Puesto pa'l Millón" (remix) (with Justin Quiles and Dalex)	2018	—	—	—	—	—		Non-album singles
"Todo Va a Estar Bien" (with Mark B.)	2018	—	—	—	—	—		Non-album singles
"Millones" (with Jay Menez, Jon Z, Bryant Myers, El Alfa, DJ Luian and Mambo Kingz)	2018	—	—	—	—	—		Non-album singles
"Falso Amor" (with Jon Z)	2018	—	—	—	—	—		Non-album singles
"Bésame" (with Revol, Jon Z and Baby Rasta)	2018	—	—	—	—	—		Non-album singles
"Como Soy II" (with Pacho "El Antifeka", Anuel AA and Farruko)	2019	—	—	—	—	—		Non-album singles
"Dios Bendiga" (remix) (with Tito Flow, Amenazzy, De la Ghetto and Noriel)	2019	—	—	—	—	—		Non-album singles
"Si Se Da" (remix) (with Myke Towers, Farruko, Sech and Zion)	2019	—	—	—	24	—	PROMUSICAE: 2× Platinum; RIAA: 13× Platinum (Latin)	Non-album singles
"Te Esperaré"	2019	—	—	—	—	—	RIAA: Gold (Latin)	Historias de un Capricornio
"Perreito" (remix) (with Mariah Angeliq and Darell)	2019	—	—	—	—	—		Non-album singles
"Vivimo Caro" (remix) (with Jose Reyes and Eladio Carrión featuring Jon Z and Duki)	2019	—	—	—	—	—		Non-album singles
"Invicto"	2019	—	—	—	—	—	RIAA: Gold (Latin)	Historias de un Capricornio
"Rasta Barbie" (remix) (with Farruko, El Alfa and Myke Towers)	2019	—	—	—	—	—		Non-album single
"Memoria Rota" (with Myke Towers)	2019	—	—	—	—	—	RIAA: Platinum (Latin)	Historias de un Capricornio
"Traficante" (with King Goyi)	2019	—	—	—	—	—		Non-album singles
"MCNTM" (remix) (with Marvel Boy, Casper Magico, Quimico Ultra Mega and Pablo Chill-E)	2019	—	—	—	—	—		Non-album singles
"Sigues Con Él" (with Sech or remix with Romeo Santos)	2019	78	3	6	16	159	PROMUSICAE: Platinum; RIAA: 8× Platinum (Latin)	Historias de un Capricornio
"No Hay Amor"	2020	—	—	—	—	—		Road to Fast 9
"Tussi" (with Justin Quiles and Eladio Carrión featuring De la Ghetto)	2020	—	—	—	24	—	PROMUSICAE: Platinum; RIAA: Gold (Latin)	Los Favoritos 2
"Amantes y Amigos" (with Sech)	2020	—	26	—	74	—		Los Favoritos 2
"La Boca" (with Farina)	2021	—	—	—	—	—		FloWres
"Te Va Bien" (with Kevvo and Becky G featuring Darell)	2021	—	—	—	—	—	RIAA: Platinum (Latin)	Cotidiando
"Te Acuerdas" (with Sech)	2021	—	35	—	—	—		42
"JS4E"	2022	—	23	—	46	—		Sr. Santos
"Baby Father 2.0" (with YovngChimi and Myke Towers featuring Ñengo Flow and Yeruza)	2022	—	—	—	—	—	RIAA: Platinum (Latin)	WLGS
"La Jumpa" (with Bad Bunny)	2022	68	3	27	1	15	PROMUSICAE: 5× Platinum	Sr. Santos
"No Te Vayas"	2022	—	—	—	—	—		Sr. Santos
"Kame Hame"	2022	—	—	—	—	—		Sr. Santos
"PortoBello"	2022	—	—	—	—	—		Sr. Santos
"Arcángel: Bzrp Music Sessions, Vol. 54" (with Bizarrap)	2023	—	34	9	3	30	PROMUSICAE: Platinum	Non-album single
"La Chamba" (with Peso Pluma)	2023	—	50	—	—	—		Sentimiento, Elegancia y Más Maldad
"Plutón"	2023	—	—	—	—	—		Sentimiento, Elegancia y Más Maldad
"ALV" (with Grupo Frontera)	2023	—	39	—	—	—		Sentimiento, Elegancia y Más Maldad
"Me Gusta Tu Flow"	2023	—	—	—	—	—		Sentimiento, Elegancia y Más Maldad
"X'clusivo" (remix) (with Gonzy and Saiko)	2024	—	—	—	—	—		Non-album single
"Acho PR" (with Bad Bunny, Ñengo Flow, and De la Ghetto)	2024	83	24	—	22	47		Nadie Sabe Lo Que Va a Pasar Mañana
"Peso Completo" (with Peso Pluma)	2024	—	—	—	—	—		Éxodo

=== As featured artist ===
List of singles as featured artist, with selected chart positions and certifications, showing year released and album name
Title	Year	Chart positions			Certifications	Album
Title	Year	US Bub.	US Latin	SPA	Certifications	Album
"Agresivo" (Jowell & Randy featuring Arcángel)	2006	—	—	—		La Calle Vol. 1
"Aparentemente" (Yaga & Mackie featuring Arcángel & De la Ghetto)	2007	—	42	—		La Reunión
"Un Amor Como Tú" (Julio Voltio featuring Arcángel)	2007	—	—	—		En Lo Claro
"Algo Musical" (Ñejo & Dalmata featuring Arcángel)	2007	—	—	—		Broke & Famous
"Pa Frontiale A Cualquiera" (Yaga y Mackie featuring Arcángel)	2008	—	—	—		Los Mackieavelikos
"Un Party Remix" (Plan B featuring Arcángel, Franco "El Gorila")	2008	—	—	—		Non-album single
"Pasion" (Daddy Yankee featuring Arcángel)	2008	—	—	—		Talento de Barrio
"Yo Tengo Una Gata [Intro]" (Zion y Lennox featuring De la Ghetto, Arcángel, Daddy Yankee, Yomo, Alexis, Angel Doze, Plan B, Yaviah, Jadiel, Franco El Gorila)	2009	—	—	—		Pa La Calle Mixtape
"Sentimiento" (Vico C featuring Arcángel)	2009	—	—	—		Babilla
"Regalame Una Noche" (J Álvarez featuring Arcángel)	2009	—	—	—		Otro Nivel De Música
"Traeme A Tu Amiga" (Farruko featuring Arcángel & Julio Voltio)	2010	—	—	—		Talento Del Bloque
"Caliente" (Dyland & Lenny featuring Arcángel)	2010	—	—	—		My World
"Danza Kuduro (Official Remix)" (Don Omar featuring Lucenzo, Daddy Yankee & Arcángel)	2010	—	—	—		Meet The Orphans
"Guaya" (Daddy Yankee with Arcángel)	2012	—	—	—		El Imperio Nazza
"Llegamos A La Disco" (Daddy Yankee featuring De la Ghetto, Ñengo Flow, Arcángel, Farruko, Baby Rasta & Gringo, Alex Kyza & Kendo Kaponi)	2012	—	—	—		Prestige
"Por Los Míos" (Alex Kyza featuring Arcángel & De la Ghetto)	2012	—	—	—		Street King: The Mixtape
"Baja El Fronte De Mostro" (Kendo Kaponi featuring Arcángel)	2012	—	—	—		Los Duros: The Mixtape
"Yo Soy De Aquí" (Don Omar featuring Yandel, Daddy Yankee & Arcángel)	2013	—	—	—		The Last Don 2
"Mi Vida No Va A Cambiar" (Farruko featuring Arcángel)	2013	—	—	—		Imperio Nazza: Farruko Edition
"Hay Party" (Ñejo featuring Arcángel)	2014	—	—	—		Yo Soy La Fama
"Hasta Verla Sin Na'" (Tony Dize featuring Arcángel)	2015	—	—	—		La Melodía De La Calle: 3rd Season
"Mensajes De Texto" (El Boy C featuring Arcángel)	2015	—	—	—		Non-album singles
"Si No Te Quiere (Remix)" (Ozuna featuring Arcángel & Farruko)	2015	—	19	—		Non-album singles
"Sin Mucha Demora 2" (Randy Nota Loca featuring Arcángel & De la Ghetto)	2015	—	—	—		Roses & Wine
"La Ocasión" (Mambo Kingz & DJ Luian featuring De la Ghetto, Arcángel, Anuel AA & Ozuna)	2016	—	21	—	RIAA: 13× Platinum (Latin)	Non-album singles
"Diles" (with Bad Bunny, Farruko and Ozuna featuring Arcángel and Ñengo Flow)	2016	—	—	85	PROMUSICAE: 3× Platinum; RIAA: 4× Platinum (Latin)	Non-album singles
"DM (Remix)" (Mueka featuring Cosculluela, Arcángel, J Balvin & De la Ghetto)	2016	—	33	—		Non-album singles
"Ahora Dice" (Chris Jeday featuring Arcángel, J Balvin & Ozuna)	2017	4	7	7	PROMUSICAE: 4× Platinum	Non-album singles
"Vitamina" (Maluma featuring Arcángel)	2017	—	49	—		Non-album singles
"Nuestra Canción Pt. 2" (Snow Tha Product featuring Arcángel)	2017	—	—	—		Non-album singles
"Ven y Hazlo Tú" (Nicky Jam, J Balvin and Anuel AA featuring Arcángel)	2019	—	—	56		Non-album singles
"A Correr Los Lakers" (Remix) (El Alfa, Ozuna and Nicky Jam featuring Arcángel and Secreto "El Famoso Biberón")	2020	—	—	—	PROMUSICAE: Gold	Non-album singles
"Tócame" (Anitta featuring Arcángel & De la Ghetto)	2020	—	—	—		Non-album singles
"Only Fans (Remix)" (Young Martino, Lunay and Myke Towers, featuring Jhay Cortez, Arcángel, Darell, Ñengo Flow, Brray & Joyce Santana)	2020	—	—	94	PROMUSICAE: Gold; RIAA: 2× Platinum (Latin)	Non-album singles
"Se Le Ve" (Dímelo Flow, Sech and Dalex, featuring Justin Quiles, Arcángel, De la Ghetto and Lenny Tavárez)	2021	—	—	92	PROMUSICAE: Gold; RIAA: 3× Platinum (Latin)	Always Dream

== Other charted and certified songs ==
List of other charted songs, with selected chart positions, certifications and album name
Title	Year	Peak chart positions				Certifications	Album
Title	Year	US Bub.	US Latin	SPA	WW	Certifications	Album
"Infeliz" (with Bad Bunny)	2019	—	33	57	—	PROMUSICAE: Gold; RIAA: 2× Platinum	Historias de un Capricornio
"P Fkn R" (Bad Bunny featuring Kendo Kaponi and Arcángel)	2020	18	19	48	—		YHLQMDLG
"Satisfacción" (with Myke Towers)	2020	—	45	94	—		Los Favoritos 2
"Soy una Gárgola" (with Rauw Alejandro and Randy)	2020	—	—	66	—		Afrodisíaco
"Bottas" (with Duki and Bizarrap)	2022	—	—	79	—		Sr. Santos
"La Ruta" (with YovngChimi)	2022	—	45	—	—		Sr. Santos
"Pasiempre" (with Tainy, Jhayco, Arca, Myke Towers, and Omar Courtz)	2023	20	28	32	122	PROMUSICAE: Gold	Data
"Laguna" (with Mora)	2023	—	—	56	—		Estrella
"Los Roques" (with Quevedo)	2023	—	—	87	—		Sentimiento, Elegancia y Más Maldad
"Tanta Droga" (with Eladio Carrión and De la Ghetto)	2024	—	—	54	—		Sol María
"Flowhot" (Dímelo Flow, Sech, Dalex, Justin Quiles and Lenny Tavárez featuring Arcángel, De la Ghetto and Randy)	2024	—	—	69	—		The Academy: Segunda Misión
"Que Sensación" (with Jezzy	2025	—	—	74	—		

== Guest appearances ==
List of non-single guest appearances, with other performing artists, showing year released and album name
Title	Year	Other artist(s)	Album
"La Distancia"	2007	Luny Tunes	Los Benjamins: La Continuación
"Cazando"	2007	Zion, Don Omar	Flow Factory
"Que Lloren" (Remix)	2007	Ivy Queen, Tito El Bambino and Naldo	Sentimiento Platinum Edition
"Nada Va A Pasar"	2008	Yaga & Mackie	Los Mackieavelikos
"Pa Frontarle a Cualquiera"	2008	Yaga & Mackie	Los Mackieavelikos
"Mi Amor Es Pobre"	2009	Tony Dize, Ken-Y	La Melodía De La Calle "Updated"
"Se Acordan de Mi"	2009	Tempo	Free Tempo
"El Demonio De La Tinta"	2010	Kendo Kaponi	The Orphan's Demon
"Pa' Lo Tiguere Vacano"	2010	—	The Orphan's Demon
"Nuestro Combo"	2011	Randy Nota Loca, De la Ghetto, Guelo Star	Una Nota Con Elegancia
"Tu Juguetito Sexual"	2011	Galante	Una Nota Con Elegancia
"Me Rankié"	2011	Maya	Superhuman: The Mixtape
"Lo De Nosotros"	2011	Gotay	El Concepto
"Sé Que es Así"	2011	Yeyow	Armados y Peligrosos
"Gata Oficial"	2011	Luigi 21 Plus	El Boki Sucio
"Feliz Navidad 3"	2011	Los de la Nazza	Los de la Nazza: The Collection, Vol. 1
"Barcelona"	2012	Onyx	Mr. Crossover
"Hablan De Mi"	2012	Tego Calderón	The Original Gallo Del País - O.G. El Mixtape
"Euros"	2012	De la Ghetto, Alex Kyza	Champion Boyz
"Dévorame"	2012	Ñengo Flow	Real G4 Life Part II
"La Dupleta"	2012	Daddy Yankee	El Imperio Nazza: Gold Edition
"No Lo Intenten"	2013	Gaona	La Mina de Oro
"Dime Qué Pasó"	2013	Daddy Yankee	El Imperio Nazza: Top Secret Edition
"Relájate Conmigo"	2013	De la Ghetto	Geezy Boyz: The Album
"Sincero Amor (Official Remix)"	2013	De la Ghetto	Geezy Boyz: The Album
"Millionarios"	2013	Daddy Yankee	King Daddy
"Se Acabaron Los Hombres"	2013	Tempo, De la Ghetto	Free Music
"Travesuras (Official Remix)"	2014	Nicky Jam, De la Ghetto, J Balvin, Zion	Nicky Jam Hits
"Triple S"	2014	Artista Rosario	El Teatro De La Mente
"Paño De Lágrimas"	2014	Luigi 21 Plus	In Business
"¿Dónde Están?"	2014	Perreke, Big Boy, Zion, Franco El Gorila, Farruko, J Álvarez, Luigi 21 Plus	La Makinaria Vol. 1
"4 Gente"	2014	Poeta Callejero	Hagan Sus Diligencias
"Antes No Tenía Na'"	2014	Yeyow, Genio	I'm Blessed
"Salgo"	2014	Farruko, D.Ozi, Kelmitt, Genio, Ñengo Flow, Alexio "La Bestia"	Los Menores
"A Fuego Lento"	2014	Jaycob Duque	Boy Toy
"Tu Conmigo"	2014	Tony Lenta	Somos Diferentes
"Me Dejo Llevar"	2015	DJ Luian & Wise The Gold Pen	14F
"Decisiones"	2015	DJ Luian & Wise The Gold Pen, Luigi 21 Plus	14F
"Los Vaqueros (Intro)"	2015	Wisin, Gávilan, Baby Rasta, Cosculluela, Tito El Bambino, Franco El Gorila, Ñengo Flow, J Álvarez, Farruko, Pusho, Jenay	Los Vaqueros: La Trilogía
"Si Tú Sigues"	2015	Jory, Farruko	Matando La Liga
"EveryDay"	2015	Randy Nota Loca, Jowell	Roses & Wine
"Tu Cariño"	2015	Maluma	Pretty Boy, Dirty Boy
"Me Impresionó"	2015	Yeyow	La Potencia
"Alerta Roja"	2016	Daddy Yankee, Zion, Nicky Jam, De la Ghetto, Kafú Banton, Plan B, J Balvin, Farruko, Cosculluela, El Micha, Brytiago, Alexio "La Bestia", Mozart La Para, Secreto, Gente De Zona	El Disco Duro
"Me Ama, Me Odia"	2016	Ozuna, Brytiago, Cosculluela, Revol	El Pentágono 2
"Triste Recuerdo"	2016	Cosculluela, De la Ghetto	Blanco Perla
"Despacio"	2017	Nicky Jam	Fénix
"Eres Tú"	2017	Ñengo Flow	Real G4 Life, Vol. 3
"Oficial"	2020	Sech, Gigolo & La Exce	1 of 1
"Joseo y Fe"	2021	Ovi	Retumban2
"F40" (remix)	2021	J Balvin	Jose (Deluxe Edition)
"Me Jodí..."	2023	Tainy	Data
"Que Fluya"	2024	Residente	Las Letras Ya No Importan
