= Cuaderno =

2019 single by Dalex, Nicky Jam and Justin Quiles

Single by Dalex, Nicky Jam and Justin Quiles featuring Sech, Lenny Tavárez, Feid and Rafa Pabön

from the album Climaxxx
- Language: Spanish
- English title: "Notebook"
- Released: May 9, 2019
- Genre: Latin R&B
- Length: 4:46
- Label: Rich; La Industria; Universal Latino
- Songwriter(s): Carlos Morales Williams; Esteban Higuita Estrada; Ivo Thomas Serue; Jorge Valdés Vásquez; Joshua Méndez; Juan Diego Medina; Julio González Tavárez; Justin Quiles Rivera; Nick Rivera Caminero; Pedro Daleccio Torres; Rafael Pabón Navedo; Salomón Villada Hoyos
- Producer(s): Dímelo Flow; Wain

Dalex singles chronology
"¿Qué Más, Pues?" (remix) (2019)	"Cuaderno" (2019)	"Bailemos" (2019)

Nicky Jam singles chronology
"Body Good" (2019)	"Se Le Ve" (2019)	"Ven y Hazlo Tú" (2019)

Justin Quiles singles chronology
"¿Qué Más, Pues?" (remix) (2019)	"Cuaderno" (2019)	"Mi Llamada" (remix) (2019)

Sech singles chronology
"¿Qué Más, Pues?" (remix) (2019)	"Cuaderno" (2019)	"La Mentira" (remix) (2019)

Lenny Tavárez singles chronology
"¿Qué Más, Pues?" (remix) (2019)	"Cuaderno" (2019)	"Mi Llamada" (remix) (2019)

Feid singles chronology
"Trampa" (2019)	"Cuaderno" (2019)	"Badwine" (remix) (2019)

Rafa Pabön singles chronology
"Me Atrevo" (2019)	"Cuaderno" (2019)	"La Mentira" (remix) (2019)

Music video
- "Cuaderno" on YouTube

"Cuaderno" is a song by American singers Dalex, Nicky Jam and Justin Quiles featuring Panamian singer Sech, Puerto Rican singer Lenny Tavárez, Colombian singer Feid and fellow Puerto Rican singer Rafa Pabön. It was released on May 9, 2019, through Rich Music, La Industria, Inc. and Universal Music Latino, as the third single from Dalex's first studio album Climaxxx (2019). The song was written by Dímelo Flow, Khea, Joshua Méndez, Juan Diego Medina and Wain in conjunction with the aforementioned artists.

== Background and lyrics ==
The song is about a man who has feelings for a woman and wants to be intimate with her. He reminisces about past encounters and wonders when they can meet again to be together. The lyrics are explicit in describing his physical attraction and desire for each other. "Cuaderno" was written by Dalex, Nicky Jam, Justin Quiles, Sech, Lenny Tavárez, Feid, Rafa Pabön, Dímelo Flow, Khea, Joshua Méndez, Juan Diego Medina and Wain, while it was produced by Dímelo Flow and Wain. The Argentine rapper Khea was going to participate in the song, but due to his busy schedule and the need for all the artists to be present at the recording of the video clip, it was decided to decline his participation.

== Audio visualizer ==
The audio visualizer for "Cuaderno" was posted on Dalex's YouTube channel on May 9, 2019, marking the release of the song as a single.

== Music video ==
The music video for "Cuaderno" was posted on Dalex's YouTube channel on June 7, 2019. The music video stars the artists themselves and takes place in a high school in the 90s. Its concept revolves around the experience of first school love. The filming was directed by Daniel "Calamar" Gallego and produced by Cinema Entertainment.

== Charts ==
=== Weekly charts ===
Weekly chart performance for "Cuaderno"
Chart (2019)	Peak position
Argentina (Argentina Hot 100)	13
Spain (PROMUSICAE)	15
US Hot Latin Songs (Billboard)	47

Weekly chart performance for "Cuaderno"
Chart (2021–2022)	Peak position
Peru (UNIMPRO)	385

=== Year-end charts ===
Year-end chart performance for "Pa Mí"
Chart (2019)	Position
Spain (PROMUSICAE)	57

== Certifications ==
Certifications for "Cuaderno"
Region	Certification	Certified units/sales
Spain (PROMUSICAE)	2× Platinum	80,000^{‡}
United States (RIAA)	Diamond (Latin)	600,000^{‡}
^{‡} Sales+streaming figures based on certification alone.
