= La Ranger =

2024 single by Sech, Justin Quiles, Lenny Tavárez, Dalex and Dímelo Flow

Single by Sech, Justin Quiles, Lenny Tavárez, Dalex and Dímelo Flow featuring Myke Towers

from the album The Academy: Segunda Misión
- Language: Spanish
- English title: "The Ranger"
- Published: March 28, 2024
- Released: April 1, 2024
- Genre: Reggaeton
- Label: Warner Latina; Rich
- Songwriters: Carlos Morales Williams; Carlos Torrejón Verano; Jeremy O. Ruiz; Johnny López Pimentel; Julio González Tavárez; Justin Quiles Rivera; Michael Torres Monge; Pablo Mitre Rodríguez; Pedro Daleccio Torres; Ramiro Barsallo Sánchez; Ramsés Herrera Soto; Jorge Valdés Vázquez
- Producers: Dímelo Flow; BK; One Rose; PM Beatz

Sech singles chronology
"Sí, Sí, Sí, Sí" (2024)	"La Ranger" (2024)	"Latte" (2024)

Justin Quiles singles chronology
"Sí, Sí, Sí, Sí" (2024)	"La Ranger" (2024)	"Latte" (2024)

Lenny Tavárez singles chronology
"Sí, Sí, Sí, Sí" (2024)	"La Ranger" (2024)	"Latte" (2024)

Dalex singles chronology
"Sí, Sí, Sí, Sí" (2024)	"La Ranger" (2024)	"Latte" (2024)

Dímelo Flow singles chronology
"Sí, Sí, Sí, Sí" (2024)	"La Ranger" (2024)	"Latte" (2024)

Myke Towers singles chronology
"Tu Cuerpo Me Llama" (2024)	"La Ranger" (2024)	"La Falda" (club remixes) (2024)

Music video
- "La Ranger" on YouTube

"La Ranger" is a song by Panamian singer Sech, American singer Justin Quiles, Puerto Rican singer Lenny Tavárez, also American singer Dalex and Panamian producer Dímelo Flow featuring also Puerto Rican singer Myke Towers. It was released on April 1, 2024, as the second single from collaborative studio album The Academy: Segunda Misión (2024).

== Promotion and release ==
The song was promoted with a preview that went viral on TikTok, achieving more than 30 thousand creations in 8 days. On March 28, 2024, the song was released along with the rest of the songs from the album The Academy: Segunda Misión.

== Music video ==
The music video for "La Ranger" was released on April 1, 2024, via Warner Music Latina's YouTube channel. The video managed to be a trend on said platform globally in its first week of release, reaching first place in Puerto Rico and Panama, while in Uruguay it achieved second place and in countries such as Bolivia, Colombia, Costa Rica, Ecuador, Guatemala, Honduras and Peru obtained the third place. Finally, in both Mexico and Argentina it ranked fourth.

== Charts ==
Weekly chart performance for "La Ranger"
Chart (2024)	Peak position
Argentina Hot 100 (Billboard)	63
Bolivia (Billboard)	19
Colombia (Billboard)	8
Ecuador (Billboard)	10
Global 200 (Billboard)	176
Peru (Billboard)	9
Spain (Promusicae)	3
US Hot Latin Songs (Billboard)	43

== Certifications ==
Certifications and sales for "La Ranger"
Region	Certification	Certified units/sales
Spain (Promusicae)	Platinum	60,000^{‡}
United States (RIAA)	3× Platinum (Latin)	180,000^{‡}
^{‡} Sales+streaming figures based on certification alone.
