= Se Le Ve =

2021 single by Dímelo Flow, Sech and Dalex

Single by Dímelo Flow, Sech and Dalex featuring Justin Quiles, Arcángel, De la Ghetto and Lenny Tavárez

from the album Always Dream
- Language: Spanish
- English title: "You Can See It"
- Released: August 12, 2021
- Genre: Reggaeton
- Length: 4:32
- Label: Rich
- Songwriters: Carlos Morales; Rafael Castillo; Jorge Valdés; Austin Santos; Julio González; Justin Quiles; Miguel Martínez; Pedro Daleccio
- Producers: Dímelo Flow; Slow Mike

Dímelo Flow singles chronology
"Hickey" (2021)	"Se Le Ve" (2021)	"MCC" (2021)

Sech singles chronology
"911" (remix) (2021)	"Se Le Ve" (2021)	"Wao" (2021)

Dalex singles chronology
"Real" (2021)	"Se Le Ve" (2021)	"Pa'nama" (2021)

Justin Quiles singles chronology
"Vitamina Q" (2021)	"Se Le Ve" (2021)	"Unfollow" (2021)

Arcángel singles chronology
"Todo Caro" (2021)	"Se Le Ve" (2021)	"Swaggy" (remix) (2021)

De la Ghetto singles chronology
"Súbele" (2021)	"Se Le Ve" (2021)	"Tú La Tienes" (2021)

Lenny Tavárez singles chronology
"Se Soltó" (2021)	"Se Le Ve" (2021)	"Como Si Nada" (remix) (2021)

Music video
- "Se Le Ve" on YouTube

"Se Le Ve" (transl. "You Can See It") is a song by Panamanian producer Dímelo Flow, Panamanian singer Sech and American singer Dalex featuring American singers Justin Quiles, Arcángel and De la Ghetto, and Puerto Rican singer Lenny Tavárez. It was released on August 12, 2021, through Rich Music, as the third single from Dímelo Flow's debut studio album Always Dream (2022). The song was written by all singers and Miguel Martínez, with Dímelo Flow co-writing it and producing it, along with Slow Mike.

== Background ==
Dímelo Flow previewed a snippet of a song which contained a verse by Arcángel, with a verse by De la Ghetto later being previewed. A final version of it was titled "Se Le Ve" and was released on August 12, 2021, which also added Sech, Dalex, Justin Quiles, and Lenny Tavárez.

== Commercial performance ==
Though "Se Le Ve" did not debut in any charts in the United States, it peaked at number 158 on the Billboard Global Excl. US chart. It also peaked at number 57 on the Billboard Argentina Hot 100 and number 92 on Spain's weekly song chart.

== Charts ==
Chart performance for "Se Le Ve"
Chart (2021–22)	Peak position
Argentina Hot 100 (Billboard)	57
Bolivia (Billboard)	15
Costa Rica Urbano (Monitor Latino)	10
Ecuador (Billboard)	19
Global Excl. US (Billboard)	158
Peru (Billboard)	14
Spain (PROMUSICAE)	92

== Certifications ==
Certifications for "Se Le Ve"
Region	Certification	Certified units/sales
Spain (Promusicae)	Gold	30,000^{‡}
United States (RIAA)	3× Platinum (Latin)	180,000^{‡}
^{‡} Sales+streaming figures based on certification alone.
