= 1 of 1 (Sech album) =

Studio album by Sech
- Released: May 21, 2020
- Genre: Reggaeton
- Length: 63:00
- Label: Rich Music
- Producers: Dimelo Flow; Slow Mike; Jhon El Diver; Subelo NEO; Sky Rompiendo; Symon Dice; Dynell; Rike Music; Alez El Ecuatoriano; Mozart Musik; Klasico; Noize "El Nuevo Sonido"

Sech chronology
Sueños (2019)	1 of 1 (2020)	42 (2021)

Singles from 1 of 1
- 1. "Si Te Vas" Released: September 26, 2019; 2. "Relación" Released: April 1, 2020

1 of 1 is the second studio album by Panamanian singer Sech, released on May 21, 2020 through Rich Music. It was mainly produced by Dimelo Flow (who also produced Sech's previous album) with contributions from producers Slow Mike, Jhon El Diver, Subelo NEO, Sky Rompiendo, Symon Dice, Dynell, Rike Music, Alez El Ecuatoriano, Mozart Musik and Klasico and features collaborations with Myke Towers, Arcángel, Gigolo & La Exce, Daddy Yankee, Lenny Tavárez, Nando Boom, Justin Quiles, Farruko, BCA and Ozuna.

At the 21st Annual Latin Grammy Awards, the album was nominated for Best Urban Music Album while the song "Si Te Vas" received a nomination for Best Reggaeton Performance. It also received a nomination for Urban Album of the Year at the Premio Lo Nuestro 2021.

The album peaked at number 168 and 4 at the Billboard 200 and Top Latin Albums charts, respectively, it also peaked at number 21 on the Independent Albums chart.

== Background ==
Prior to the release of the album, Sech released an EP titled A Side on April 16, 2020, the EP was composed of four songs, "Goteras", "Panama City", "Fé" and "Trofeo", all four songs were eventually included into 1 of 1. The date for the release of the album alongside its number of tracks and collaborations was announced by Sech himself during a zoom listening party from Panama City, where he lived during the COVID-19 pandemic.

The album was released on May 21, 2020, composing of 21 tracks and featuring collaborations with urban music artists such as Daddy Yankee and Ozuna, among others, about the release and reception of the album, Sech said that "the uncertainty was huge, I was very nervous but the result is being much better that I have imagined, I am very happy". The name of the album comes from the fact that each song is separated from the others, only connected by Sech's voice and the themes of love and heartbreak.

== Singles ==
The album's first single was the song "Si Te Vas" with Puerto Rican singer Ozuna, released on September 26, 2019. The second single "Relación" was released on April 1, 2020, with a remix of the song featuring Daddy Yankee, J Balvin, Rosalía and Farruko being released on September 4, 2020. The remix of the song peaked at number 2 and 64 at the Hot Latin Songs and Billboard Hot 100 charts, respectively, being Sech's fourth entry into the latter chart.

== Critical reception ==
Billboard included 1 of 1 on their list The 25 Best Latin Albums of 2020: Staff Picks, with Jessica Roiz noting "Sech pays tribute to his reggae plena roots, fusing it with reggaetón, dancehall, and dembow".

=== Accolades ===
Accolades for 1 of 1
Publication	Accolade	Rank
Billboard	25 Best Latin Albums of 2020: Staff Picks	—N/a

== Awards and nominations ==
Award	Year	Recipient(s) and nominee(s)	Category	Result	Ref.
Latin Grammy Awards	2020	"Si Te Vas" (with Ozuna)	Best Reggaeton Performance	Nominated	
Latin Grammy Awards	2020	1 of 1	Best Urban Music Album	Nominated	
MTV MIAW Awards	2021	"Relación (Remix)" (with Daddy Yankee, J Balvin, Rosalía, & Farruko)	Hit of the Year	Nominated	
Premios Juventud	2021	"Relación (Remix)" (with Daddy Yankee, J Balvin, Rosalía, & Farruko)	Viral Track of the Year	Nominated	
Premios Juventud	2021	"Relación (Remix)" (with Daddy Yankee, J Balvin, Rosalía, & Farruko)	La Mezcla Perfecta	Won	
Premios Lo Nuestro	2021	"Relación (Remix)" (with Daddy Yankee, J Balvin, Rosalía, & Farruko)	Remix of the Year	Nominated	
Premios Lo Nuestro	2021	1 of 1	Urban Album of the Year	Nominated	
Premios Lo Nuestro	2022	"911 (Remix)" (with Jhayco)	Remix of the Year	Nominated	
Premios Tu Música Urbano	2020	"Si Te Vas" (with Ozuna)	Collaboration of the Year - New Generation	Won	

== Track listing ==
1 of 1 track listing
No.	Title	Writer(s)	Producer(s)	Length
1.	"Me Olvidé"	Carlos Isaias Morales Williams; Jorge Valdés Vázquez; Joshua Mendez; Miguel Andrés Martinez Perea	Dimelo Flow; Slow Mike	2:37
2.	"Casino"	Morales Williams; Valdés Vázquez; Mendez; Daniel Rodríguez; Isaac Ortiz Geronimo; Jhonattan Jacob Reyes Cedano; Ramsés Iván Herrera Soto	Dímelo Flow; Jhon El Diver	3:01
3.	"Bentley" (featuring Myke Towers)	Morales Williams; Valdés Vázquez; Mendez; Martinez Perea; Michael Torres Monge	Dímelo Flow; Slow Mike	3:08
4.	"Oficial" (featuring Arcángel and Gigolo & La Exce)	Morales Williams; Valdés Vázquez; Austin Agustín Santos; Freddy Montalvo; Jean Carlos Ferreira Suero; José Carlos Cruz; Ronald Rafael Tejeda Santos	Dímelo Flow; Subelo NEO	3:17
5.	"Portarse Mal"	Morales Williams; Valdés Vázquez; Mendez; Martinez Perea	Dímelo Flow; Slow Mike	3:06
6.	"Fé"	Morales Williams; Valdés Vázquez; Mendez; Martinez Perea	Dímelo Flow	2:52
7.	"Confía" (featuring Daddy Yankee)	Morales Williams; Valdés Vázquez; Mendez; Martinez Perea; Ortiz Geronimo; Ramon Ayala	Dímelo Flow; Slow Mike	3:22
8.	"En Lo Oscuro"	Morales Williams; Valdés Vázquez; Mendez; Martinez Perea; Alejandro Ramírez	Dímelo Flow; Slow Mike; Sky Rompiendo	2:21
9.	"Relación"	Morales Williams; Valdés Vázquez; Mendez; Martinez Perea; Herrera Soto	Dímelo Flow; Slow Mike	3:04
10.	"Dale" (featuring Lenny Tavárez)	Morales Williams; Valdés Vázquez; Mendez; Julio Manuel González Tavárez	Dímelo Flow	2:42
11.	"Trofeo"	Morales Williams; Valdés Vázquez; Mendez; Manuel Enrique Cortés Cleghorn	Dímelo Flow; Rike Music	3:26
12.	"Se Va Viral" (featuring Nando Boom)	Morales Williams; Valdés Vázquez; Mendez; Herrera Soto; Fernando Orlando Brown; Ramon Bustamante	Dímelo Flow	2:29
13.	"Tú y Yo" (featuring Zion & Lennox)	Morales Williams; Valdés Vázquez; Mendez; Eduardo Alfonso Vargas Berrios; Felix Ortiz Torres; Gabriel Pizarro; Simon Restrepo	Dímelo Flow; Symon Dice; Dynell	3:46
14.	"Goteras"	Morales Williams; Valdés Vázquez; Mendez; Gabriel Morales	Dímelo Flow	2:52
15.	"Uni"	Morales Williams; Valdés Vázquez; Mendez; Martinez Perea; Cortés Cleghorn	Dímelo Flow; Slow Mike; Rike Music	2:29
16.	"Fabuloso" (featuring Justin Quiles)	Morales Williams; Valdés Vázquez; Mendez; Martinez Perea; Jose Luis Nisco Chaparro; Justin Rafael Quiles; Marcello Pastuisaca	Dímelo Flow; Slow Mike; Alez El Ecuatoriano; Mozart Musik	3:20
17.	"Arriba" (featuring Farruko)	Morales Williams; Valdés Vázquez; Mendez; Carlos Efrén Reyes Rosado; Mauro Menendez	Dímelo Flow; Maheez	3:10
18.	"Panama City"	Morales Williams; Valdés Vázquez; Mendez; Antonio Enrique Nuñez Del Mar	Dímelo Flow; Klasico	2:46
19.	"Dios Te Guarde" (featuring BCA)	Morales Williams; Valdés Vázquez; Mendez; Herrera Soto; Bryan Lezcano Chaverra; Kevin Mauricio Jiménez Londoño	Dímelo Flow	2:43
20.	"Siempre"	Morales Williams; Valdés Vázquez; Mendez; Reyes Cedano; Cortés Cleghorn	Dímelo Flow; Rike Music; Jhon El Diver	3:09
21.	"Si Te Vas" (featuring Ozuna)	Morales Williams; Valdés Vázquez; Mendez; Restrepo; Vicente Saavedra; Juan Carlos Ozuna Rosado	Dímelo Flow; Symon Dice	3:24
Total length:				63:00

== Charts ==
Weekly chart performance for 1 of 1
Chart (2019)	Peak position
Spanish Albums (PROMUSICAE)	8
US Billboard 200	168
US Independent Albums (Billboard)	21
US Top Latin Albums (Billboard)	4
US Latin Rhythm Albums (Billboard)	4

=== Year-end charts ===
Year-end chart performance for 1 of 1
Chart (2020)	Position
Spanish Albums (PROMUSICAE)	47
US Top Latin Albums (Billboard)	27

Year-end chart performance for 1 of 1
Chart (2021)	Position
US Top Latin Albums (Billboard)	32

== Certifications ==
Certifications for 1 of 1
Region	Certification	Certified units/sales
United States (RIAA)	3× Platinum (Latin)	180,000^{‡}
^{‡} Sales+streaming figures based on certification alone.
