= 42 (Sech album) =

Studio album by Sech
- Released: April 15, 2021
- Genre: Reggaeton
- Length: 36:19
- Labels: Rich Music, Universal Music Publishing
- Producers: Sech; Dimelo Flow; Cerebro; Jhon El Divertido

Sech chronology
1 of 1 (2019)	42 (2021)	The Academy: Segunda Misión (2024)

Singles from 42
- 1. "911" Released: February 5, 2021; 2. "Te Acuerdas" Released: March 19, 2021; 3. "Sal y Perrea" Released: April 15, 2021

42 is the third studio album by Panamanian singer Sech. The album was released through Rich Music on April 15, 2021 and was co-produced by Dimelo Flow, Cerebro, and Jhon El Divertido. It contains 11 tracks with guest appearances from Wisin, Yandel, Arcángel, Nicky Jam, and Rauw Alejandro.

The album was nominated for Album of the Year - Male at the 2022 Premios Tu Música Urbano. The album peaked at number 43 and 7 on the Billboard Top Latin Albums and Independent Albums charts.

== Background ==
While his previous album was created partially during lockdown due to COVID-19, 42 was created "fully in the pandemic", where Sech used a journal from when he was younger as inspiration for the album. Production lasted about a year and a half, with Sech and the co-producers working in studios in Panama, United States cities Los Angeles, New York City, and Miami, and La Romana, Puerto Rico. The album was intended to be released at the end of the year 2020, but was postponed to 2021.

The name of the album was chosen as a tribute to Jackie Robinson, the first African American in the MLB, and Mariano Rivera, the Panamanian baseball player who wore 42 to honor Robinson and was the last MLB player allowed to wear the number 42 after the number was retired by the League.

== Release and promotion ==
The first single of the album, "911", was released on February 5, 2021 along with a music video. The second single, "Te Acuerdas" featuring Arcángel, was released on March 19, 2021. On April 15, 2021, "Sal y Perrea" was released as a single with a music video alongside the album. At release, Sech called 42 his "best project".

Sech released a 12-minute documentary along with the album, directed by his brother Moises. The documentary focuses on the struggles Sech faced while growing up.

On October 4, 2021, NPR released Sech's Tiny Desk Concert performance, where he sang "Playa", "911", and "Sal y Perrea".

== Critical reception ==
=== Accolades ===
Work	Publication	List	Rank	Ref.
42	Billboard	The 25 Best Latin Albums of 2021 So Far: Staff Picks	—N/a	
42	Billboard	The 20 Best Latin Albums of 2021: Staff Picks	—N/a	
42	NPR	The Best Latin Music of 2021	—N/a	
"Sal y Perrea"	Pitchfork	The 10 Best Songs by Latinx Artists in 2021 (So Far)	—N/a	

== Awards and nominations ==
Award	Year	Recipient(s) and nominee(s)	Category	Result	Ref.
Premios Lo Nuestro	2022	"911 (Remix)" (with Jhayco)	Remix of the Year	Nominated	
Premios Lo Nuestro	2023	"Sal y Perrea (Remix)" (with Daddy Yankee & J Balvin)	Remix of the Year	Won	
Premios Tu Música Urbano	2022	"Sal y Perrea (Remix)" (with Daddy Yankee & J Balvin)	Remix of the Year	Nominated	
Premios Tu Música Urbano	2022	"911 (Remix)" (with Jhayco)	Remix of the Year	Nominated	
Premios Tu Música Urbano	2022	42	Album of the Year - Male	Nominated	

== Track listing ==
42 track listing
No.	Title	Writer(s)	Producer(s)	Length
1.	"Pata' Abajo"	Carlos Isaias Morales Williams; Jorge Valdés Vázquez; Eduardo Fernandez; Juan Luis Morera Luna; Llandel Veguilla Malave; Marvin Hawkins Rodríguez; Omar Jahir Perez de Gracia	Dimelo Flow; Cerebro; DJ Maff	4:05
2.	"Mi Ex"	Morales Williams; Valdés Vázquez; Fernandez; Jhonattan Jacob Reyes; Manuel Enrique Cortes; Perez de Gracia; Ramses Ivan Soto Herrera "BCA"	Dímelo Flow; Cerebro; Rike Music; Jhon El Divertido	3:03
3.	"¿Qué Somos?"	Albert Hype; Morales Williams; Valdés Vázquez; Fernandez; Michael Masis "Mvsis"; Perez de Gracia; Soto Herrera	Dímelo Flow; Cerebro; Mvsis; Albert Hype	2:52
4.	"Te Acuerdas" (featuring Arcángel)	Morales Williams; Valdés Vázquez; Austin Agustín Santos; Fernandz; Perez de Gracias; Soto Herrera	Dímelo Flow; Cerebro	3:47
5.	"Feliz de Mentira"	Morales Williams; Valdés Vázquez; Reyes; Johnny Oscar Lopez Pimentel; Cortes; Perez de Gracia	Dímelo Flow; Jhon El Divertido; BK; Rike Music	3:11
6.	"PSL"	Morales Williams; Fernandez; Reyes; Cortes; Perez de Gracia; Soto Herrera	Dímelo Flow; Cerebro; Rike Music; Jhon El Divertido	2:55
7.	"Playa" (featuring Nicky Jam and Rauw Alejandro)	Morales Williams; Alejandro Ramirez "Sky Rompiendo"; Nick Rivera Caminero; Perez de Gracia; Soto Herrera; Raúl Alejandro Ocasio Ruiz	Sky Rompiendo	3:12
8.	"Duvibes"	Morales Williams; Valdés Vázquez; Fernandez; Perez de Gracia	Dímelo Flow; Cerebro	3:00
9.	"911"	Morales Williams; Chan El Genio (of The Rude Boyz); Ily Wonder; Valdés Vázquez; Kevin ADG (of The Rude Boyz); Fernandez; Perez de Gracia	Dímelo Flow; Cerebro	3:35
10.	"Sal y Perrea"	Andrea Elena Mangiamarchi; Morales Williams; Valdés Vázquez; Fernandez; Reyes; Perez de Gracia	Dímelo Flow; Cerebro; Jhon El Divertido	3:36
11.	"Wao"	Morales Williams; Valdés Vázquez; Fernandez; Reyes; Perez de Gracia	Dímelo Flow; Cerebro; Jhon El Divertido	2:58
Total length:				36:19

== Charts ==
Weekly chart performance for 42
Chart (2019)	Peak position
Spanish Albums (PROMUSICAE)	18
US Independent Albums (Billboard)	43
US Top Latin Albums (Billboard)	7
US Latin Rhythm Albums (Billboard)	6

=== Year-end charts ===
Year-end chart performance for 42
Chart (2021)	Position
Spanish Albums (PROMUSICAE)	34
US Top Latin Albums (Billboard)	31

Year-end chart performance for 42
Chart (2022)	Position
US Top Latin Albums (Billboard)	78

== Certifications ==
Certifications for 42
Region	Certification	Certified units/sales
Spain (Promusicae)	Gold	20,000^{‡}
United States (RIAA)	2× Platinum (Latin)	120,000^{‡}
^{‡} Sales+streaming figures based on certification alone.
