= List of number-one songs of 2019 (Panama) =

This is a list of the number-one songs of 2019 in Panama. The charts are published by Monitor Latino, based on airplay across radio stations in Panama using the Radio Tracking Data, LLC in real time. The chart week runs from Monday to Sunday.

During 2019, sixteen singles reached number one in Panama. Of those sixteen number-one singles, twelve were collaborations. In total, twenty-four acts topped the chart as either lead or featured artists, with eighteen—Felipe Araujo, Pedro Capó, Farruko, Snow, Silvestre Dangond, Camila Cabello, Juanes, Alessia Cara, Greice Santo, Jonas Brothers, Natti Natasha, Sech, Darell, Shawn Mendes, Jace López, Real Phantom, Nacho and Yandel—achieving their first number-one single in Panama.

Daddy Yankee's "Con Calma" was the longest-running number-one of the year and later ranked as the best-performing single of 2019 in Panama, leading the chart for fourteen non-consecutive weeks, becoming the fourth song with most weeks at number one in Panama following "Despacito" by Luis Fonsi and Daddy Yankee featuring Justin Bieber (2017), "Dura" by Daddy Yankee (2018) and "Mi Gente (Remix)" by J Balvin and Willy William featuring Beyoncé (2017–18).

Daddy Yankee and Sebastián Yatra were the only acts to have multiple number-one songs in 2019, with three apiece.

== Chart history ==
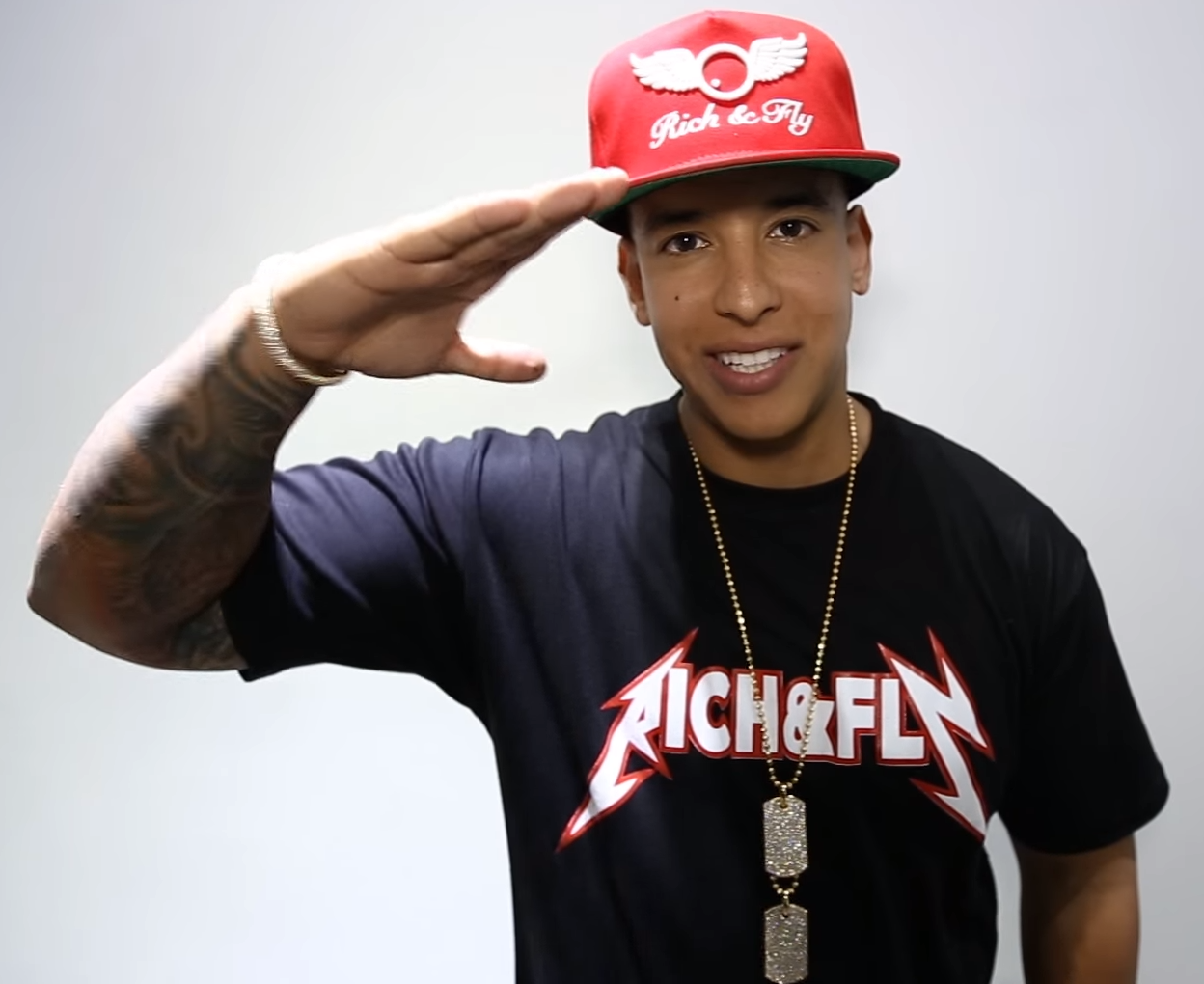
"Con Calma" by Daddy Yankee (pictured) became the best-performing single of 2019 in Panama, and the longest-running number-one song of 2019 spending 14 weeks at number one. With "Que Tire Pa Lante", Daddy Yankee extended his own record for the most weeks at number one in Panama, with 62 weeks in total.

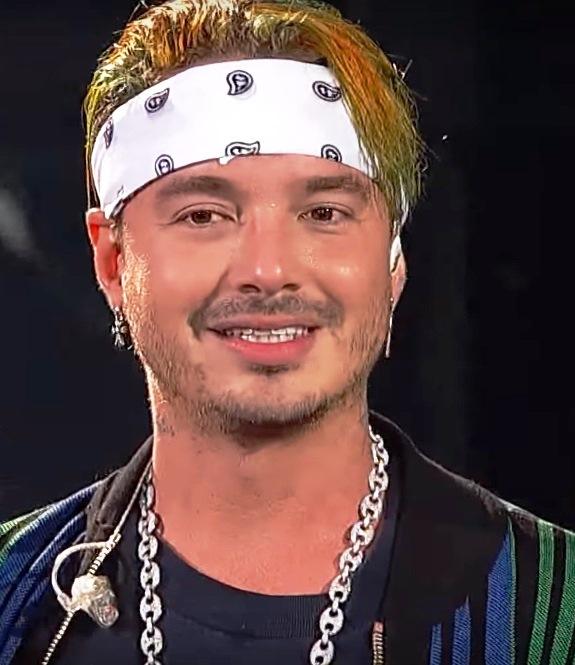
J Balvin (pictured) scored his seventh number-one song with "Qué Pena", extending his own record as the act with the most number-one singles in Panama.

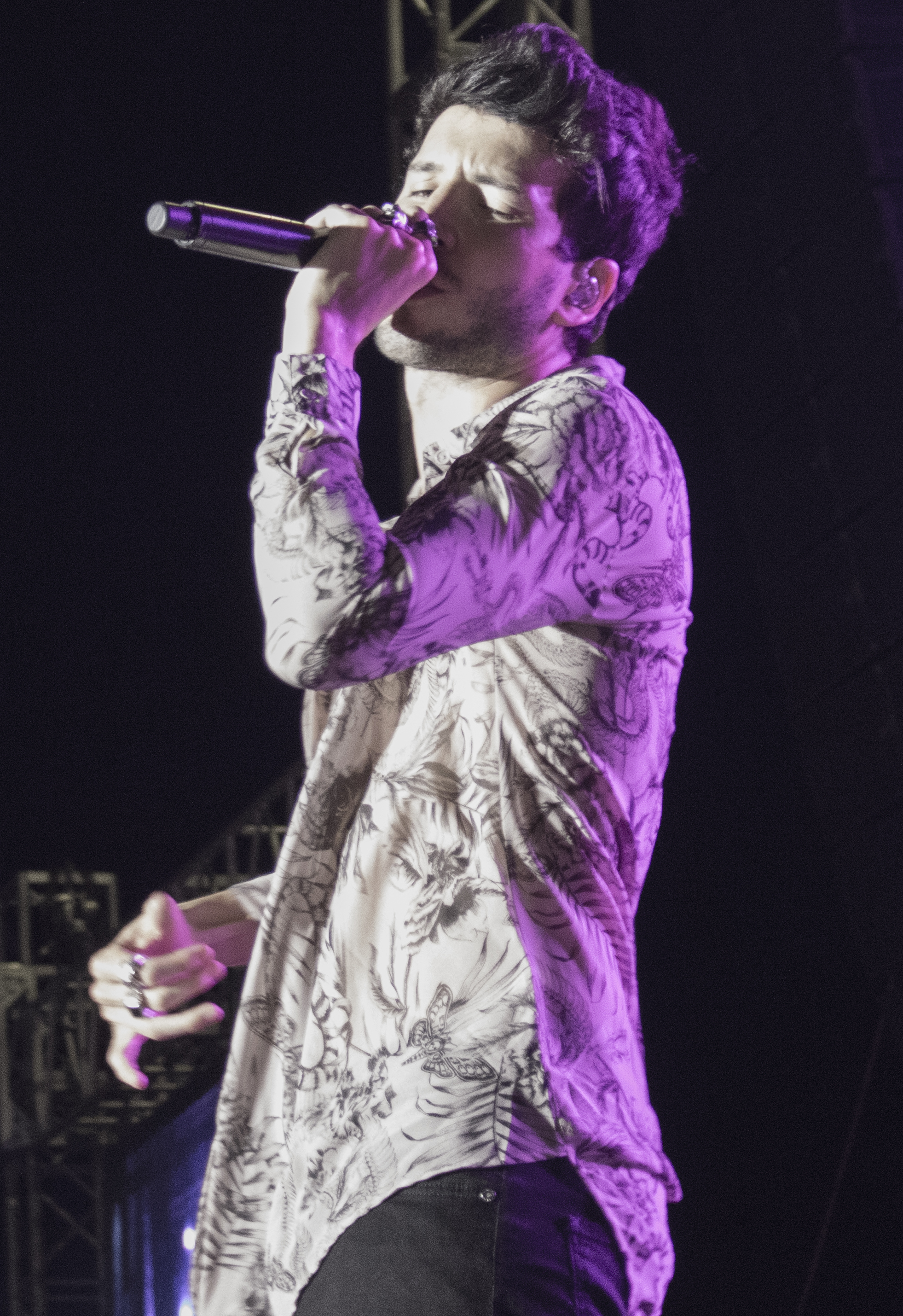
Sebastián Yatra (pictured) scored three number-one hits in Panama with "Runaway", "Bonita" and "Ya No Más".

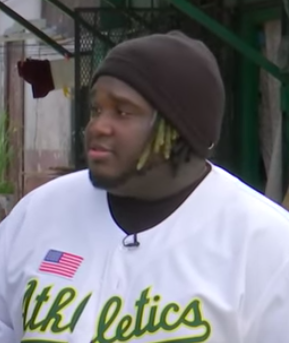
Panamanian singer Sech (pictured) earns his first number-one single with "Otro Trago".

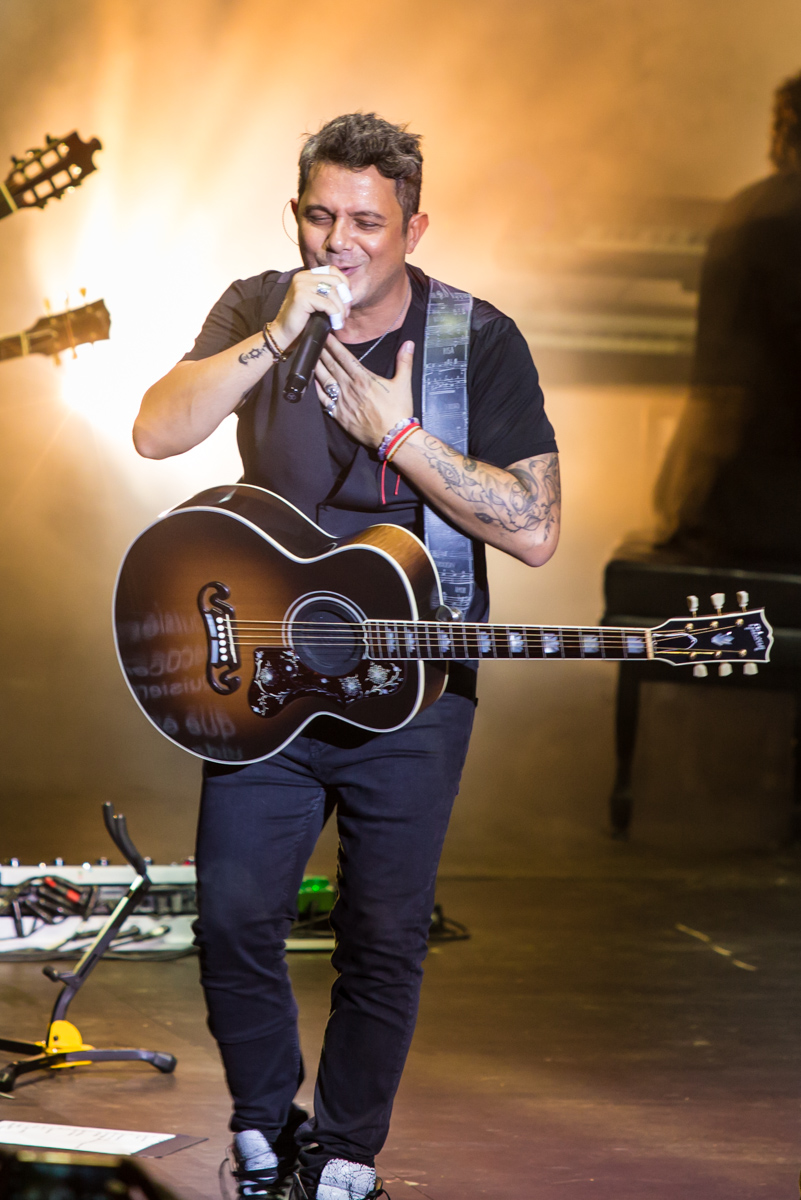
"Mi Persona Favorita" became Alejandro Sanz's (pictured) second number-one single in Panama, and his first in 21 years since "Amiga Mía".

Key
| † | Indicates best-performing single of 2019 |

| Issue date | Song | Artist | Reference |
|---|---|---|---|
| 7 January | "Viral Pisadinha" | Joey Montana and Felipe Araujo | |
| 14 January | "Viral Pisadinha" | Joey Montana and Felipe Araujo | |
| 21 January | "Viral Pisadinha" | Joey Montana and Felipe Araujo | |
| 28 January | "Calma (Remix)" | Pedro Capó and Farruko | |
| 4 February | "Calma (Remix)" | Pedro Capó and Farruko | |
| 11 February | "Con Calma" † | Daddy Yankee featuring Snow | |
| 18 February | "Calma (Remix)" | Pedro Capó and Farruko | |
| 25 February | "Con Calma" † | Daddy Yankee featuring Snow | |
| 4 March | "Con Calma" † | Daddy Yankee featuring Snow | |
| 11 March | "Calma (Remix)" | Pedro Capó and Farruko | |
| 18 March | "Vivir Bailando" | Silvestre Dangond and Maluma | |
| 25 March | "Con Calma" † | Daddy Yankee featuring Snow | |
| 1 April | "Con Calma" † | Daddy Yankee featuring Snow | |
| 8 April | "Con Calma" † | Daddy Yankee featuring Snow | |
| 15 April | "Con Calma" † | Daddy Yankee featuring Snow | |
| 22 April | "Con Calma" † | Daddy Yankee featuring Snow | |
| 29 April | "Con Calma" † | Daddy Yankee featuring Snow | |
| 6 May | "Con Calma" † | Daddy Yankee featuring Snow | |
| 13 May | "Con Calma" † | Daddy Yankee featuring Snow | |
| 20 May | "Con Calma" † | Daddy Yankee featuring Snow | |
| 27 May | "Mi Persona Favorita" | Alejandro Sanz and Camila Cabello | |
| 3 June | "Con Calma" † | Daddy Yankee featuring Snow | |
| 10 June | "Con Calma" † | Daddy Yankee featuring Snow | |
| 17 June | "Querer Mejor" | Juanes featuring Alessia Cara | |
| 24 June | "Querer Mejor" | Juanes featuring Alessia Cara | |
| 1 July | "Querer Mejor" | Juanes featuring Alessia Cara | |
| 8 July | "Querer Mejor" | Juanes featuring Alessia Cara | |
| 15 July | "Voce Voce" | Greice Santo | |
| 22 July | "Runaway" | Sebastián Yatra, Daddy Yankee and Natti Natasha featuring Jonas Brothers | |
| 29 July | "Runaway" | Sebastián Yatra, Daddy Yankee and Natti Natasha featuring Jonas Brothers | |
| 5 August | "Otro Trago" | Sech featuring Darell | |
| 12 August | "Señorita" | Shawn Mendes and Camila Cabello | |
| 19 August | "Señorita" | Shawn Mendes and Camila Cabello | |
| 26 August | "Señorita" | Shawn Mendes and Camila Cabello | |
| 2 September | "Tonta Fui" | Jace López | |
| 9 September | "Tonta Fui" | Jace López | |
| 16 September | "Tonta Fui" | Jace López | |
| 23 September | "Tonta Fui" | Jace López | |
| 30 September | "Bonita" | Juanes and Sebastián Yatra | |
| 7 October | "Sin Novio" | Real Phantom | |
| 14 October | "Sin Novio" | Real Phantom | |
| 21 October | "Sin Novio" | Real Phantom | |
| 28 October | "Qué Pena" | Maluma and J Balvin | |
| 4 November | "Qué Pena" | Maluma and J Balvin | |
| 11 November | "Qué Pena" | Maluma and J Balvin | |
| 18 November | "Qué Pena" | Maluma and J Balvin | |
| 25 November | "Que Tire Pa Lante" | Daddy Yankee | |
| 2 December | "Que Tire Pa Lante" | Daddy Yankee | |
| 9 December | "Que Tire Pa Lante" | Daddy Yankee | |
| 16 December | "Ya No Más" | Nacho, Joey Montana and Yandel featuring Sebastián Yatra | |
| 23 December | "Ya No Más" | Nacho, Joey Montana and Yandel featuring Sebastián Yatra | |
| 30 December | "Ya No Más" | Nacho, Joey Montana and Yandel featuring Sebastián Yatra | |
