= The Academy: Segunda Misión =

Studio album by Dímelo Flow, Sech, Dalex, Justin Quiles and Lenny Tavárez
- Released: March 28, 2024
- Genres: Reggaeton; Latin R&B; Latin trap
- Length: 35:14
- Labels: Warner Latina; Rich
- Producer: Dímelo Flow

Dímelo Flow chronology
Always Dream (2022)	The Academy: Segunda Misión (2024)

Sech chronology
42 (2021)	The Academy: Segunda Misión (2024)	Tranki, Todo Pasa (2024)

Dalex chronology
Reggaetón Sex (2023)	The Academy: Segunda Misión (2024)

Justin Quiles chronology
La Última Promesa (2021)	The Academy: Segunda Misión (2024)	Permanente (2024)

Lenny Tavárez chronology
Krack (2021)	The Academy: Segunda Misión (2024)	Billar (2024)

Singles from The Academy: Segunda Misión
- 1. "Sí, Sí, Sí, Sí" Released: March 29, 2024; 2. "La Ranger" Released: April 1, 2024; 3. "Latte" Released: April 5, 2024; 4. "Flowhot" Released: April 9, 2024; 5. "El Royce" Released: April 15, 2024; 6. "Quítenme el Teléfono" Released: April 22, 2024; 7. "Amiga" Released: April 24, 2024

The Academy: Segunda Misión is a collaborative studio album by Panamanian producer Dímelo Flow, fellow Panamanian singer Sech, American singers Dalex and Justin Quiles, and Puerto Rican singer Lenny Tavárez, which was released on March 28, 2024, through Warner Latina and Rich. It is the sequel to the 2019 EP The Academy, with the absence of Feid, who appeared on the previous album. It contains guest appearances by Arcángel, Bryant Myers, Dei V, De la Ghetto, Eladio Carrión, iZaak, Jay Wheeler, María Becerra, Myke Towers, Natti Natasha, Omar Courtz, Randy, Ryan Castro, Yandel and Zion.

== Background and release ==
Before the album's release, "La Ranger" was released as a promotional single on TikTok, where it went viral. The album was announced in March 2024 and was confirmed to be the reunion of "the Avengers", which consists of Dímelo Flow, Sech, Dalex, Justin Quiles, Lenny Tavárez, and Feid. Feid did not appear on any track of the album by release, with some questioning his absence.

Like the previous album, The Academy (2019), the album's concept is inspired by the Avengers.

== Track listing ==
The Academy: Segunda Misión track listing
No.	Title	Length
1.	"Sí, Sí, Sí, Sí" (featuring Eladio Carrión, Bryant Myers and Dei V)	4:02
2.	"La Ranger" (featuring Myke Towers)	3:50
3.	"Flowhot" (featuring Arcángel, De la Ghetto and Randy)	3:54
4.	"Latte" (featuring María Becerra)	4:21
5.	"El Royce" (featuring Natti Natasha and iZaak)	3:55
6.	"Quítenme el Teléfono" (featuring Yandel and Jay Wheeler)	3:55
7.	"Amiga" (featuring Ryan Castro)	4:30
8.	"Señorita" (featuring Zion)	2:54
9.	"Blinblineo" (featuring Omar Courtz)	3:57
Total length:		35:14

== Charts ==
Chart performance for The Academy: Segunda Misión
Chart (2024)	Peak position
Spanish Albums (Promusicae)	3
US Latin Rhythm Albums (Billboard)	8
US Top Latin Albums (Billboard)	19

== Certifications ==
Certifications for The Academy: Segunda Misión
Region	Certification	Certified units/sales
United States (RIAA)	Platinum (Latin)	60,000^{‡}
^{‡} Sales+streaming figures based on certification alone.
