= Relación =

2020 single by Sech

Single by Sech

from the album 1 of 1
- Language: Spanish
- English title: "Relation"
- Released: April 1, 2020
- Genre: Reggaeton
- Length: 3:04
- Label: Rich Music
- Songwriters: Carlos Isaías Morales Williams; Jorge Valdés Vásquez; Joshua Méndez; Miguel Andrés Martínez Perea; Ramses Iván Herrera Soto
- Producers: Dímelo Flow; Slow Mike

Sech singles chronology
| "Ignorantes" (2020) | "Relación" (2020) | "Casino" (2020) |

Music video
- "Relación" on YouTube

"Relación" is a song recorded by Panamanian singer and songwriter Sech. The song was released on April 1, 2020 as the second single from his sophomore studio album 1 of 1, released a month later. It was written by the performer alongside its producers and Joshua Méndez and Ramses Herrera. The track was produced by Jorge Valdes and Miguel Andrés Martínez, better known as Dímelo Flow and Slow Mike. "Relación" became a top ten hit in Panama, Argentina and Spain as well as a very popular song on TikTok. In the United States, the track made it to the twenty-second position on the Bubbling Under Hot 100 Singles chart.

A remixed version of the song featuring vocals by Daddy Yankee, J Balvin, Rosalía and Farruko, was released on September 4, 2020. It achieved great commercial success, surpassing the chart success of the original song, reaching the top ten position in Argentina, Panama and Spain, among others, and peaked at number one in Mexico. In the United States, it entered the Billboard Hot 100, peaking at 64 and topped the Latin Airplay chart as well as reaching the second position on the US Hot Latin Songs one.

== Background ==
Following the success of Sech's collaboration with Bad Bunny "Ignorantes", the Panamanian singer announced on March 30 that he would be releasing his new single "Relación" on the first of April as a new advance of his upcoming studio album. The song is about female empowerment, in this way, the song reflects again the spite and liberation of a woman in a failed relationship. A music video was uploaded on YouTube the same day the track was released in order to promote the song.

== Commercial performance ==
"Relación" has been named one of the songs of the summer of 2020 by multiple magazines specially after the track became extremely popular on TikTok following a choreography designed by Spanish influencer Samuel López. The audio reached over four million uses on the app in August. Thus, the song entered the Top 50 global Spotify chart, reaching the number one spot on the national streaming lists in many Latin American countries, topping them in Bolivia, Costa Rica, Ecuador, Honduras, Panama and Perú while reaching the top ten in Argentina, Spain and Guatemala. "Relación" became the sixth most listened song in Spain during summer season.

== Charts ==
=== Weekly charts ===
Weekly chart performance for "Relación"
| Chart (2020) | Peak position |
|---|---|
| Argentina (Argentina Hot 100) | 3 |
| Mexico (Billboard Mexican Airplay) | 28 |
| Panama (Monitor Latino) | 7 |
| Spain (PROMUSICAE) | 10 |
| US Bubbling Under Hot 100 (Billboard) | 18 |
| US Hot Latin Songs (Billboard) | 12 |

=== Year-end charts ===
2020 year-end chart performance for "Relación"
| Chart (2020) | Position |
|---|---|
| Spain (PROMUSICAE) | 28 |

== Certifications ==
Certifications and sales for "Relación"
| Region | Certification | Certified units/sales |
|---|---|---|
| Italy (FIMI) | Platinum | 100,000^{‡} |
| Spain (Promusicae) | 2× Platinum | 80,000^{‡} |
| United States (RIAA) | 29× Platinum (Latin) | 1,740,000^{‡} |
^{‡} Sales+streaming figures based on certification alone.

== Remix ==
"Relación (remix)"

Single by Sech, Daddy Yankee and J Balvin featuring Rosalía and Farruko
- Language: Spanish
- Released: September 4, 2020
- Length: 4:07
- Label: Rich Music
- Songwriters: Carlos Efrén Reyes Rosado; Carlos Isaías Morales Williams; Eduardo Fernández; Jorge Valdés Vásquez; Jose Alvaro Balvin Osorio; Miguel Andres Martínez Perea; Ramón L. Ayala; Ramses Iván Soto Herrera; Rosalia Vila Tobella

Sech singles chronology
| "Elegí (Remix)" (2020) | "Relación (remix)" (2020) | "Amantes y Amigos" (2020) |

Daddy Yankee singles chronology
| "Bésame" (2020) | "Relación (remix)" (2020) | "No Se Da Cuenta" (2020) |

J Balvin singles chronology
| "Un Día (One Day)" (2020) | "Relación (remix)" (2020) | "Billetes Azules" (2020) |

Rosalía singles chronology
| "KLK" (2020) | "Relación (remix)" (2020) | "Lo Vas a Olvidar" (2021) |

Farruko singles chronology
| "Aruba" (2020) | "Relación (remix)" (2020) | "Perfecta" (2020) |

Music video
- "Relación (remix)" on YouTube

After the music video for "Relación" reached a hundred hits on YouTube in the beginning of July, Sech share his enthusiasm on Instagram stories as well as an audio where you could hear Colombian reggaeton star J Balvin sing "latino gang. remix". Later, Rosalía shared an Instagram story of herself at a recording studio in San Juan singing to the song's melody. On August 15, Rosalía posted on TikTok a short video of her at a recording studio alongside producer David Rodríguez where she also shared a preview of the song. On August 29, 2020, the painting of a mural started in Miami to promote the remix's release. Sech, as well as Rich Music, shared the construction of the artwork on their respective social media profiles, confirming the project and the participation of Daddy Yankee and Farruko in it. On September 2, the track was confirmed to be released that same Friday at noon.

=== Charts ===
==== Weekly charts ====
Weekly chart performance for remix of "Relación"
| Chart (2020–2021) | Peak position |
|---|---|
| Argentina Hot 100 (Billboard) | 3 |
| Global 200 (Billboard) | 13 |
| Italy (FIMI) | 73 |
| Mexico (Billboard Mexican Airplay) | 1 |
| Paraguay (SGP) | 28 |
| Spain (PROMUSICAE) | 2 |
| Switzerland (Schweizer Hitparade) | 47 |
| US Billboard Hot 100 | 64 |
| US Hot Latin Songs (Billboard) | 2 |
| US Latin Airplay (Billboard) | 1 |
| US Latin Rhythm Airplay (Billboard) | 1 |

==== Year-end charts ====
2020 year-end chart performance for remix of "Relación"
| Chart (2020) | Position |
|---|---|
| Argentina Airplay (Monitor Latino) | 77 |
| Spain (PROMUSICAE) | 33 |
| US Hot Latin Songs (Billboard) | 13 |

2021 year-end chart performance for remix of "Relación"
| Chart (2021) | Position |
|---|---|
| Global 200 (Billboard) | 147 |

=== Certifications ===
| Region | Certification | Certified units/sales |
|---|---|---|
| Spain (Promusicae) | 3× Platinum | 120,000^{‡} |
^{‡} Sales+streaming figures based on certification alone.

== Release history ==
Release dates for "Relación"
| Region | Date | Format | Version | Label | Ref. |
|---|---|---|---|---|---|
| Various | April 1, 2020 | Digital download; streaming | Original | Rich Music | |
| Various | September 4, 2020 | Digital download; streaming | Remix | Rich Music | |

== See also ==
- List of Billboard number-one Latin songs of 2020
