= Río Abajo =

Corregimiento in Panamá, Panama

Coordinates: 9°01′10″N 79°30′05″W

- Corregimiento
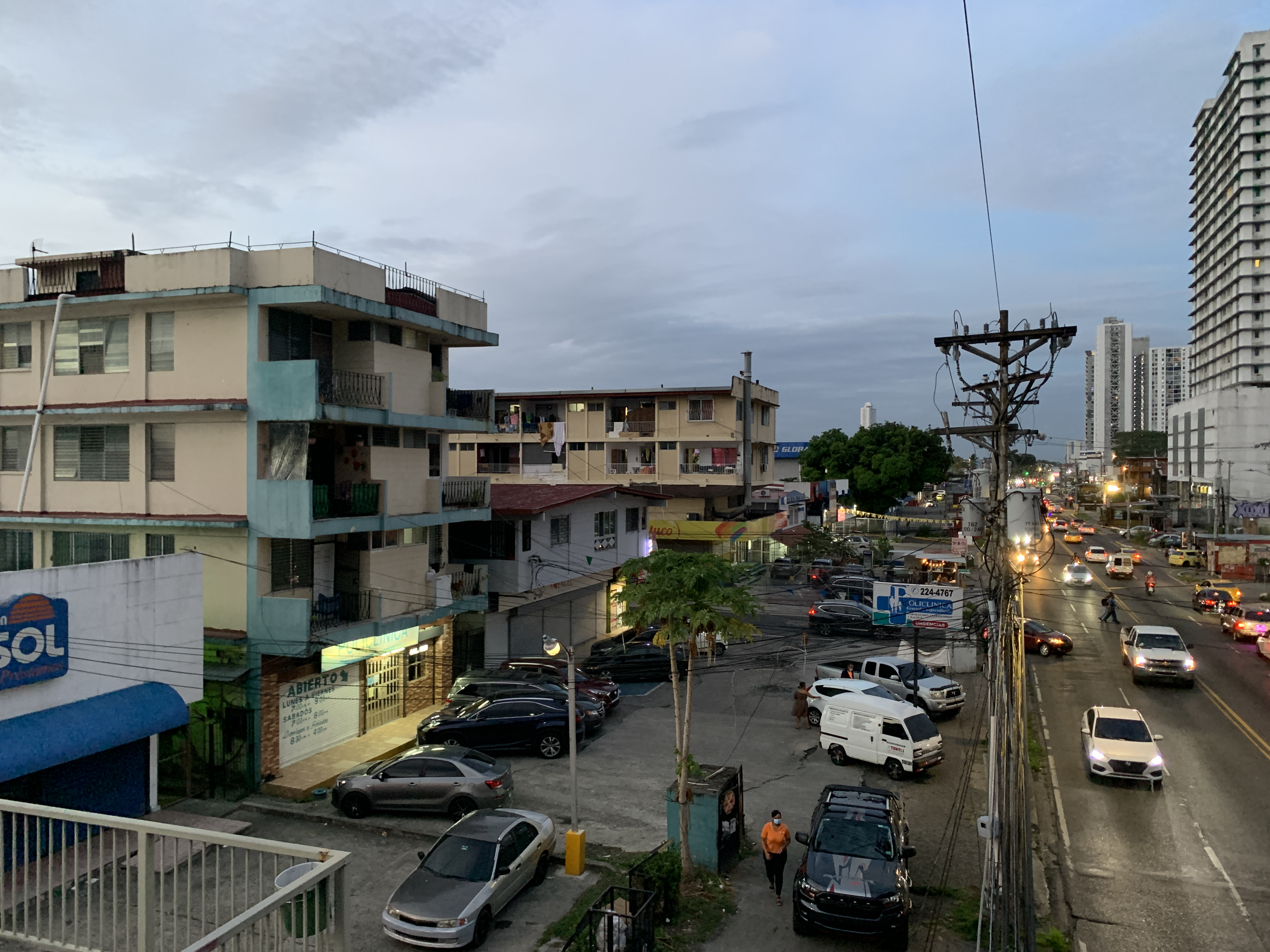

- Location within Panama
- Country: Panama
- Province: Panamá
- District: Panamá

Area
  - Land: 3.9 km^{2} (1.5 sq mi)

Population (2010)
  - Total: 26,607
  - Density: 6,892.5/km^{2} (17,851/sq mi)
- Population density calculated based on land area.
- Time zone: UTC−5 (EST)

Río Abajo is a corregimiento within Panama City, in Panamá District, Panamá Province, Panama with a population of 26,607 as of 2010. Its population as of 1990 was 33,155; its population as of 2000 was 28,714. It is a West Indian neighborhood; the unique culture of this area of Panama stems mainly from the English Caribbean people who relocated to the area from Anglophone islands in the Antilles more than a century ago, namely Jamaica and Barbados. Rio Abajo consists of over 30 streets, the most notable are 4th, 13th and 17th streets, 2 story wood houses, churches with old southern architecture. Rio Abajo is also the name of a river flowing through Rio Abajo neighborhood.

One of Rio Abajo's most famous sons is El General (born Edgardo A. Franco), arguably the one musical artist who most helped to spread the popularity of Spanish Reggae. The latter a product of Panamanian youth of Caribbean descent with the first known one to be sung by Renato.
