= Tranki, Todo Pasa =

Studio album by Sech
- Released: November 29, 2024
- Genre: Reggaeton
- Length: 40:28
- Label: Rimas

Sech chronology
The Academy: Segunda Misión (2024)	Tranki, Todo Pasa (2024)

Singles from Tranki, Todo Pasa
- 1. "Toy Perdio" Released: October 24, 2024; 2. "Tarde" Released: November 14, 2024; 3. "Tus Labios (remix)" Released: November 22, 2024

Tranki, Todo Pasa (transl. Relax, Everything Passes) is the fourth studio album by Panamanian singer Sech, and the first after he signed with Rimas Entertainment. The album was released on November 29, 2024, and contains 14 tracks including guest appearances from De la Rose, Elena Rose, Beéle, and T.Y.S.

== Background and release ==
On October 24, 2024, Sech announced his fourth album Tranki, Todo Pasa through Rolling Stone with the release of its first single, "Toy Perdio" (transl. I'm Lost). The song is Sech's first release since signing with Rimas Entertainment and was based on his personal experiences where an ex reached out to him after he had gone through a period of personal growth. On November 14, he released the album's second single, "Tarde". On November 22, Sech released a remix of his 2023 single "Tus Labios" with a new feature from Beéle. On November 29, he released the album Tranki, Todo Pasa. According to Sech, the album took five or six months to complete.

== Critical reception ==
A week after its release, Billboard included Tranki, Todo Pasa in its weekly New Music Latin recommendation list. The album was ranked 29 in Billboard's year end list The Best Latin Albums of 2024, with Jessica Roiz noting "Sech is a changed man after delivering an album that’s primarily about heartbreak and (most importantly) self-care".

=== Accolades ===
Publication	List	Rank	Ref.
Billboard	Staff Picks: The Best Latin Albums of 2024, Ranked	29	

== Awards and nominations ==
Award	Year	Recipient(s) and nominee(s)	Category	Result	Ref.
Premios Juventud	2025	Tranki, Todo Pasa	Best Urban Album	Nominated	

== Track listing ==
Tranki, Todo Pasa track listing
No.	Title	Writer(s)	Producer(s)	Length
1.	"Toy Perdio"	Carlos Isaías Morales Williams; Daves Hidalgo "Kaih"; Omar Jahir Perez de Gracia "Tokyo"	One Rose; Rafita; Sech	2:55
2.	"Tarde"	Morales Williams; Hidalgo; Perez de Gracia	One Rose; DJ Maff; Rafita; Sech	200
3.	"Gym Girl" (with De la Rose)	Morales Williams; De la Rose; Hidalgo; Perez de Gracia	One Rose; Rafita; Sech	3:42
4.	"Chiste Jaja"	Morales Williams; Hidalgo; Perez de Gracia	One Rose; Rafita; Sech	3:07
5.	"Picasso"	Morales Williams; Hidalgo; Perez de Gracia	Phantom Neo; One Rose; Rafita; Sech	3:05
6.	"1-0" (with Elena Rose)	Morales Williams; Andrea Elena Mangiamarchi; Hidalgo; Perez de Gracia; Rafita; Daniel Ignacio Rondón; Héctor Mazzarri	Édgar Barrera; One Rose; Sech	3:22
7.	"Me Quedé Off"	Morales Williams; Perez de Gracia; Hidalgo	One Rose; Rafita; Sech	3:22
8.	"Tranki, Todo Pasa" (interlude)	Morales Williams; Nina	One Rose; Kaih; Sech	1:16
9.	"Tus Labios" (remix, with Beéle)	Morales Williams; Brandon de Jesús López Orozco; Perez de Gracia	One Rose; Erick Celis; Tokyo; Rafita; Nyal	3:15
10.	"Aquí Pensando"	Morales Williams; Perez de Gracia	Cerebro; One Rose; Rafita; Sech	2:34
11.	"Deli Gourmet"	Morales Williams; Hidalgo; Perez de Gracia	One Rose; Rafita; Sech; DJ Maff	2:56
12.	"Te Lo Hundo"	Morales Williams; Hidalgo; Perez de Gracia	One Rose; Rafita; Sech	2:19
13.	"X Tu Culpa"	Morales Williams; Perez de Gracia; Hidalgo	One Rose; Rafita; Sech	2:43
14.	"Casa de Mami" (with T.Y.S)	Morales Williams; Perez de Gracia; Jhon el Divertido	One Rose; Rafita; Sech; Kaih; Cerebro	3:46
Total length:				40:28

Notes

- "Chiste Jaja" samples "Linda" by Rosalía and Tokischa.
- "Picacsso" samples "Rosas" by la Oreja de Van Gogh.

== Charts ==
Weekly chart performance for Tranki, Todo Pasa
Chart (2024)	Peak position
Spanish Albums (PROMUSICAE)	18
