= Dalex =

American singer

- Born: Pedro David Daleccio Torres; October 7, 1990 (age 35); Philadelphia, Pennsylvania, U.S.
- Genres: Reggaeton; Latin R&B
- Occupations: Singer; songwriter
- Years active: 2015–present
- Label: Rich
- Website: dalexmusic.com

Pedro David Daleccio Torres (born October 7, 1990), known professionally as Dalex, is an American singer and songwriter. He was formerly part of the duo Jayma & Dalex.

Currently, Dalex is signed to the Rich Music record label.

== Jayma and Dalex ==
After signing with Anakin Entertainment, Dalex started singing in the duo Jayma and Dalex. Their first single "Aquellos Tiempos" drew attention. Subsequently, the duo collaborated with urban artist Cosculluela on the song "Lento," which surpassed a million views on YouTube.

Jayma and Dalex's first album, Gravedad, was released in October 2015. It featured collaborations with Justin Quiles, Jory Boy and Pusho.

== Solo career - EPs, Climaxxx, and Unisex ==
In 2017, Jayma and Dalex split. Dalex began his solo career and was signed by Rich Music. His first debut single, "Puesto Pal Millón", was released in 2018, with Sech, Myke Towers, Justin Quiles, Arcángel, and Alex Rose joining him on the remix after the single gained popularity. This led to Dalex releasing two EPs in 2018: License to Trap and La Nueva Ola, with features from Rauw Alejandro, Sech, Lyanno, and Justin Quiles.

In 2018 he released the single "Pa Mi" with Rafa Pabön, which peaked in the top three on the streaming charts in six countries and at number one in 12 other countries. This led to the release of "Pa Mi (Remix)", which featured Cazzu, Sech, Feid, Khea, and Lenny Tavárez, and became Dalex's first Billboard-charting song.

He released his first studio album, Climaxxx, in 2019, which featured Nicky Jam, Justin Quiles, Rauw Alejandro, and Lyanno. Climaxxx debuted at number 20 on the Global Streaming list and in the Top 20 Latin Rhythms Albums rankings. In June, he released "Cuaderno," a popular video and song that also featured Nicky Jam, Sech, Justin Quiles, Feid, Lenny Tavárez, and Rafa Pabon. In the same year, Dalex collaborated on the EP The Academy with fellow Rich Music labelmates Sech, Justin Quiles, along with promising artists Feid, Lenny Tavárez, and Dímelo Flow. He released the Modo Avión mixtape in 2020.

Unisex, Dalex's second LP, was released in 2021. The album featured the songs "Máquina del Tiempo" with Rauw Alejandro, and "XLEY," with one of his favorite artists, Trey Songz. The album also featured Jay Wheeler, Zion y Lennox, and Ryan Castro.

== Discography ==
=== Albums ===
List of extended plays, showing selected details, chart positions, and certifications
Title	Details	Peak chart positions	Certifications
Title	Details	US Latin	Certifications
Climaxxx	Released: May 10, 2019; Label: Ingrooves; Formats: CD, digital download, streaming	13	RIAA: Platinum (Latin)
Modo Avión	Released: March 19, 2020; Label: Rich Music; Formats: CD, digital download, streaming	12	
Unisex	Released: November 4, 2021; Label: Rich Music; Formats: CD, digital download, streaming	14	

=== Collaborative albums ===
List of extended plays, showing selected details, chart positions, and certifications
Title	Details	Peak chart positions	Certifications
Title	Details	US Latin	Certifications
The Academy (with Rich Music LTD and Dalex featuring Justin Quiles, Lenny Tavárez and Feid)	Released: October 11, 2019; Label: Rich Music; Format: CD, LP, digital download, streaming	11	RIAA: Platinum (Latin)
Rich Music Sessions (Acústico En Vivo)	Released: November 4, 2021; Label: Rich Music; Formats: digital download, streaming	—	
The Academy: Segunda Misión (with Dímelo Flow and Dalex featuring Justin Quiles and Lenny Tavárez)	Released: March 28, 2024; Label: Rich Music; Format: CD, LP, digital download, streaming	19	RIAA: Platinum (Latin)

=== EPs ===
Year	Title
2018	License to Trap
2018	La Nueva Ola
2020	3AM
2022	Yo Te Quiero Pa Mi
2023	Reggaetón Sex
2024	Area 69 (F.001)
2024	Area 69 (F.002)

=== Singles ===
==== As lead artist ====
List of singles as lead artist, with selected chart positions and certifications, showing year released and album name
Title	Year	Peak chart positions							Certifications	Album
Title	Year	US Latin	ARG	ECU	ITA	MEX	PAR	SPA	Certifications	Album
"Fantasía"	2016	—	—	—	—	—	—	—		Non-album singles
"Tú Decides"	2016	—	—	—	—	—	—	—		Non-album singles
"Mi Cama"	2017	—	—	—	—	—	—	—		Non-album singles
"Rockstar (Spanish Version)" (with Dimelo Flow and Justin Quiles)	2017	—	—	—	—	—	—	—		Non-album singles
"Indomable"	2017	—	—	—	—	—	—	—		Non-album singles
"Yo No Sé"	2018	—	—	—	—	—	—	—		Non-album singles
"Psycho" (with Dímelo Flow)	2018	—	—	—	—	—	—	—		License to Trap
"Puesto Pal Millón" (with Dímelo Flow)	2018	—	—	—	—	—	—	—		License to Trap
"No Confías"	2018	—	—	—	—	—	—	—		License to Trap
"Exótico"	2018	—	—	—	—	—	—	—		License to Trap
"Afortunada"	2018	—	—	—	—	—	—	—		License to Trap
"Antes Que Te Vayas"	2018	—	—	—	—	—	—	—		License to Trap
"Yo Quisiera" (with Alex Rose)	2018	—	—	—	—	—	—	—	PROMUSICAE: Platinum	Sexflix
"Psycho (Remix)" (with Dímelo Flow and Alex Rose)	2018	—	—	—	—	—	—	—		Non-album singles
"Puesto Pal Millón" (Remix) (with Dímelo Flow, Alex Rose, Arcangel, Justin Quiles, Myke Towers, and Sech)	2018	—	—	—	—	—	—	—		Non-album singles
"Pa Mí" (with Rafa Pabön and remix featuring Sech, Cazzu, Feid, Khea and Lenny Tavárez)	2018	20	3	16	78	— (Note: "Pa Mí" did not enter the Billboard Mexico Airplay chart, but peaked at number 46 on the Mexico Espanol Airplay chart.)	14	6	RIAA: 19× Platinum (Latin); FIMI: Gold; PROMUSICAE: 3× Platinum	La Nueva Ola and Climaxxx
"Vuelva a Ver" (with Lyanno and remix featuring Justin Quiles, Sech and Rauw Alejandro)	2018	—	82	—	—	—	—	—		La Nueva Ola and Climaxxx
"Nadie La Dejo" (with Cauty, Dímelo Flow, Lyanno, and Rafa Pabön)	2018	—	—	—	—	—	—	—		Non-album singles
"Mi Regalo"	2018	—	—	—	—	—	—	—		Non-album singles
"Llame Pa' Verte" (with Dímelo Flow, Rafa Pabön, Barbara Doza, BCA)	2019	—	—	—	—	—	—	—		Non-album singles
"Cuaderno" (with Nicky Jam and Justin Quiles featuring Feid, Sech, Lenny Tavárez and Rafa Pabön)	2019	47	13	—	—	—	—	15	RIAA: Diamond (Latin); PROMUSICAE: Platinum	Climaxxx
"Es Normal" (with Menor Menor, Milly, Lary Over, Sharo Towers)	2019	—	—	—	—	—	—	—		Non-album singles
"Bellaquita" (with Lenny Tavárez)	2019	34	4	—	—	—	—	90		Non-album singles
"Cosita" (with Valentino, Lenny Tavárez, featuring Sech)	2019	—	—	—	—	—	—	—		Non-album singles
"Hola" (solo or remix featuring Lenny Tavárez, Chencho Corleone and Juhn)	2019	35	6	—	—	—	—	11	RIAA: 15× Platinum (Latin); PROMUSICAE: Platinum	Climaxxx
"Quizás" (as part of The Academy)	2019	41	31	—	—	—	—	15	RIAA: 7× Platinum (Latin); PROMUSICAE: Platinum	The Academy
"Uniforme" (as part of The Academy)	2019	—	67	—	—	—	—	91		The Academy
"Perreo en La Luna" (as part of The Academy)	2019	—	16	—	—	—	—	27	RIAA: 2× Platinum (Latin)	The Academy
"Tú Tranquila" (with RK and Lyanno)	2019	—	—	—	—	—	—	—		Non-album singles
"Comerte Toda" (with Ghetto Kids and Happy Colors)	2019	—	—	—	—	—	—	—		Non-album singles
"Bellaquita (Remix)" (with Lenny Tavárez, Anitta, Farruko, Justin Quiles, and Natti Natasha)	2019	—	4	—	—	—	—	—	RIAA: 8× Platinum (Latin)	Modo Avión
"La Isla" (with Sech, Dímelo Flow, featuring Feid, Justin Quiles, La Exce, and Zion)	2019	—	—	—	—	—	—	—		Non-album singles
"Igual o Peor" (with Gigolo Y La Exce)	2019	—	—	—	—	—	—	—		Non-album singles
"SUBIENDO" (with Becky G)	2019	—	—	—	—	—	—	—		MALA SANTA
"+Linda"	2020	—	68	—	—	—	—	—	RIAA: 5× Platinum (Latin)	Non-album single
"Mejor" (with Sech)	2020	—	57	—	—	34	—	68		Modo Avión
"Perfume" (with Justin Quiles and Sech)	2020	—	—	—	—	—	—	67		Modo Avión
"Elegí" (with Rauw Alejandro, Lenny Tavárez and Dimelo Flow)	2020	—	4	—	—	—	5	26	RIAA: Platinum (Latin); PROMUSICAE: Platinum; AMPROFON: Diamond+Gold	Non-album single
"Elegí (Remix)" (with Rauw Alejandro, Lenny Tavárez and Dimelo Flow featuring Farruko, Anuel AA, Sech, and Justin Quiles)	2020	—	—	—	—	—	91	61		Afrodisíaco
"Calling You Back" (with Chris Marshall)	2020	—	—	—	—	—	—	—		Non-album singles
"+Linda (Remix)" (with Arcangel, Beéle, De La Ghetto, and Manuel Turizo)	2020	—	—	—	—	—	—	—		Non-album singles
"Lo Noto" (with Maffio)	2020	—	—	—	—	—	—	—		Non-album singles
"Te Necesito" (with Darell, Dímelo Flow, Justin Quiles, and Rich Music LTD)	2020	—	—	—	—	—	—	—		Non-album singles
"Jockey" (with Lenny Tavárez, iZaak, and Dímelo Flow)	2020	—	—	—	—	—	—	—		Unisex
"Otra Baby" (Akim, Beéle, and Boza)	2021	—	—	—	—	—	—	—		Non-album single
"Discípulo" (with Lenny Tavárez)	2021	—	—	—	—	—	—	—		KRACK
"Hickey" (with Dímelo Flow, Justin Quiles, and iZaak)	2021	—	—	—	—	—	—	—		Unisex
"Como Si Nah) (with Justin Quiles, Arcangel, featuring KEVVO)	2021	—	—	—	—	—	—	—		Non-album single
"Feeling"	2021	—	—	—	—	24	—	—		Unisex
"XLEY" (with Trey Songz)	2021	—	—	—	—	—	—	—		Unisex
"Real" (with Justin Quiles and Konshens)	2021	—	—	—	—	—	—	—		F9: The Fast Saga (Original Motion Picture Soundtrack)
"Se Le Ve" (with Dímelo Flow, Arcangel, De La Ghetto, Justin Quiles, Lenny Tavárez, and Sech)	2021	—	54	—	—	—	—	92	PROMUSICAE: Gold; RIAA: 3× Platinum (Latin)	Always Dream
"Pa'nama"	2021	—	—	—	—	—	—	—		Unisex
"MMC" (with Jowell & Randy and Rich Music LTD, featuring Lenny Tavárez, Justin Quiles, and Dímelo Flow)	2021	—	—	—	—	—	—	—		Always Dream
"Qué Te Pasó" (with Symon Dice and Juhn, featuring Gigolo Y La Exce)	2021	—	—	—	—	—	—	—		Non-album singles
"De Cora" (Alex Rose, D-Note The Beatllionare)	2021	—	—	—	—	—	—	—		Non-album singles
"La Hora y el Día"(with Daddy Yankee and Justin Quiles)	2023	—	—	—	—	—	—	85		Non-album singles
"—" denotes a title that was not released or did not chart in that territory.

==== As a featured artist ====
List of singles as featured artist, with selected chart positions and certifications, showing year released and album name
Title	Year	Peak chart positions		Certifications	Album
Title	Year	ARG	SPA	Certifications	Album
"Ron (Remix)" (with Feid)	2019	—	—		Non-album singles
"BOTA FUEGO (Remix)" (with Dímelo Flow, Mau y Ricky, Nicky Jam, featuring Justin Quiles, and Lenny Tavárez)	2019	—	—		Non-album singles
"Qué Más Pues (Remix)" (with Sech featuring Maluma, Nicky Jam, Farruko, Justin Quiles, and Lenny Tavárez)	2019	12	18	PROMUSICAE: Platinum	Sueños
"DJ No Pare (Remix)" (with Justin Quiles featuring Natti Natasha, Farruko, Zion, and Lenny Tavárez)	2019	21	—	PROMUSICAE: Platinum	Non-album single
"Nada" (with Cazzu, Rauw Alejandro and Lyanno)	2019	65	—		Error 93
"El Efecto (Remix)" (Rauw Alejandro, Chencho Corleone, and Kevvo featuring Bryant Myers, Lyanno, and Dalex	2019	—	49	PROMUSICAE: Gold	Non-album single
"MERA" (with Tainy and Álvaro Díaz)	2020	—	—		NEON16 TAPE: THE KIDS THAT GREW UP ON REGGAETON
"Te Falle (Remix)" (with Brytiago and Lenny Tavárez)	2020	—	—		Non-album singles
"Locura (Remix) (with Cali Y El Dandee, Justin Quiles, and Sebastian Yatra)	2020	—	—		Non-album singles
"Otro Día Lluvioso" (with Juhn, Lenny Tavárez, and Becky G)	2020	—	—		Non-album singles
"Cosas Malas" (with Manuel Turizo and Justin Quiles)	2021	71	—		Dopamina
"Qué Te Pasó" (with Symon Dice, Juhn, and Gigolo Y La Exce)	2021	—	—		Non-album single
"Dificil" (with Randy)	2021	—	—		Romances de una Nota 2021, Vol. 2
"Angel" (with Gigolo Y La Exce)	2022	—	—		Las II Torres
"La Cartera (Remix)" (with Rafa Pabön& De La Ghetto)	2022	—	—		Non-album singles
"Dificil" (with Carlitos Rossy)	2022	—	—		Non-album singles
"Otro Dia" (with Freestyle Mania, Leebrian)	2022	—	—		Desamores Vol.2
"Whattsup" (with Revol, Arcangel, and Bryant Myers)	2022	—	—		Non-album singles
"Tour (Remix)" (with Eix and Juhn)	2022	—	—		Non-album singles
"3 Deseos (Remix)" (with ROBI and Eix, featuring Alejo)	2022	—	—		Non-album singles
"Que te Paso (Remix)" (with Symon Dice, DEEIKEL, LuMiix and Joelsa)	2022	—	—		Non-album singles
"Falda Corta" (with Thyago)	2022	—	—		Journey EP
"Doble Cara" (with Dimelo Flow)	2022	—	—		Always Dream
"En La Disco Revela" (with DJ Nelson and Alejandro Armes)	2022	—	—		De Camino A Palomino, Vol. 1
"—" denotes a title that was not released or did not chart in that territory.
