= Dímelo Flow =

Panamanian record producer

- Born: Jorge Valdés Vázquez; September 11, 1989 (age 37); Panama
- Other name: DJ Flow
- Occupations: Producer, DJ

Jorge Valdés Vázquez, better known as DJ Flow or Dímelo Flow, is a Panamanian DJ and producer based in the United States. After collaborating with many artists and producers in the Latin music industry like J Balvin, Justin Quiles, Dalex, and Feid, Dímelo Flow released his debut album Always Dream with features from Ozuna, Nicky Jam, Arcangel, and Reik.

== Life and career ==
Dímelo Flow began his career as a DJ at 15 years old. When he was 20 years old, he moved to Florida from Panama working for a radio station until he began to work consistently as a DJ for clubs in Tampa, Florida. In Tampa, Dímelo Flow met Justin Quiles, a successful reggaeton singer-songwriter that was not well known at the time. Soon after meeting, the two began working together and Dímelo Flow began producing his songs. Quiles introduced him to more artists in the Latin music industry, which led to him being signed by RichMusic.

=== 2022–present: Always Dream ===
After producing many hits for his label mates at Rich Music, including the popular album The Academy, he has developed close bonds with up-and-coming as well as well-known artists, who contributed to his debut album, Always Dream. Ozuna, Farruko, Chencho Corleone, De La Ghetto Zion & Lennox, Wisin, Nicky Jam, Jowell & Randy, Arcangel, Reik, and newcomers Mariah Angeliq, Beéle, paopao, and Thyago are among the other performers on the 28-track album.

== Artistry ==
Dímelo Flow's style is described as an electronic twist to reggaeton. He is also known for being able to adapt to the style of other musical artists and find a middle ground for both his and their styles.

== Discography ==
=== Studio albums ===
Title	Details	Peak chart positions			
Title	Details	SPA	US Heat	US Latin	US Latin Rhythm
Always Dream	Released: June 9, 2022; Label: RichMusic; Formats: Digital download, streaming	27	2	13	9

=== Collaborative albums ===
Title	Details
License to Trap (with Dalex)	Released: June 14, 2018; Label: RichMusic; Format: Digital download, streaming

=== Singles ===
List of singles, with selected chart positions and certifications, showing year released and album name
Title	Year	Peak chart positions								Certifications	Album
Title	Year	ARG	BOL	COL	ECU	PER	SPA	US Latin	WW	Certifications	Album
"In the Morning" (featuring Justin Quiles and Fuego)	2017	—	—	—	—	—	—	—	—		Non-album singles
"Tu Pollo" (with Justin Quiles and Sech)	2017	—	—	—	—	—	—	—	—		Non-album singles
"Rockstar" (with Dalex Justin Quiles)	2017	—	—	—	—	—	—	—	—		Non-album singles
"El Favor" (with Nicky Jam and Sech featuring Farruko, Zion and Lunay)	2019	26	—	—	—	—	30	21	—	PROMUSICAE: Platinum; RIAA: 2× Platinum (Latin)	Non-album singles
"Elegí" (Rauw Alejandro, Lenny Tavárez and Dalex featuring Dímelo Flow)	2020	4	—	—	—	—	26	— (Note: "Elegí" did not enter the Billboard Hot Latin Songs chart, but peaked at number 12 on the Billboard Latin Digital Songs Sales chart.)	98	PROMUSICAE: Platinum; RIAA: Platinum (Latin)	Non-album singles
"Se Le Ve" (with Sech, Lenny Tavárez, Arcángel, De la Ghetto, Justin Quiles, and Dalex)	2021	54	15	—	19	14	92	—	— (Note: "Se Le Ve" did not enter the Billboard Global 200 chart, but peaked at number 158 on the Global Excl. US chart.)	PROMUSICAE: Gold; RIAA: 3× Platinum (Latin)	Always Dream
"Suelta" (with Farruko and Rauw Alejandro featuring Mr. Vegas, María Becerra, and Fatman Scoop)	2022	—	—	—	38	—	—	— (Note: "Suelta" did not enter the Billboard Hot Latin Songs chart, but peaked at number 12 on the Billboard Latin Digital Songs Sales chart.)	—		Always Dream
"Sí, Sí, Sí, Sí" (with Sech, Dalex, Justin Quiles and Lenny Tavárez featuring Eladio Carrión, Bryant Myers and Dei V)	2024	—	—	—	—	—	10	—	—		The Academy: Segunda Misión
"La Ranger" (with Sech, Dalex, Justin Quiles and Lenny Tavárez featuring Myke Towers)	2024	63	19	8	10	9	3	43	176	PROMUSICAE: Gold	The Academy: Segunda Misión
"Latte" (with Sech, Dalex, Justin Quiles and Lenny Tavárez featuring María Becerra)	2024	21	—	—	—	—	70	—	—		The Academy: Segunda Misión
"Flowhot" (with Sech, Dalex, Justin Quiles and Lenny Tavárez featuring Arcángel, De la Ghetto and Randy)	2024	—	—	—	—	—	69	—	—		The Academy: Segunda Misión
"El Royce" (with Sech, Dalex, Justin Quiles and Lenny Tavárez featuring Natti Natasha and iZaak)	2024	—	—	—	—	—	—	—	—		The Academy: Segunda Misión

=== Other charted songs ===
List of songs, with selected chart positions, showing year released and album name
Title	Year	Peak chart positions			Album
Title	Year	ECU	PER	SPA	Album
"Quítenme el Teléfono" (with Sech, Dalex, Justin Quiles and Lenny Tavárez featuring Yandel and Jay Wheeler)	2024	20	18	55	The Academy: Segunda Misión

=== Produced songs ===
Title	Year	Other performer(s)
"In the Morning"	2017	Justin Quiles and Fuego
"Tu Pollo"	2017	Justin Quiles and Sech
"Rockstar" (Spanish version)	2017	Dalex and Justin Quiles
"Envidiosos"	2018	Bryant Myers, Dalex, Farruko, Justin Quiles, and Kelmitt
"Dinero Facil"	2018	Brytiago, Gigolo Y La Exce, and Justin Quiles
"Psycho" (remix)	2018	Dalex and Alex Rose
"Me Frontió"	2018	Justin Quiles, Alex Rose, Gigolo Y La Exce
"Pa Mí"	2018	Dalex and Rafa Pabön
"Nadie La Dejo"	2018	Dalex, Lyanno, Rafa Pabön, and Cauty
"ALOÓ"	2019	BCA
"Llame Pa' Verte"	2019	Dalex, Rafa Pabön, Barbara Doza, BCA
"El Favor"	2019	Nicky Jam and Sech, featuring Farruko, Zion, and Lunay
"La Isla"	2019	Sech and Dalex featuring Justin Quiles, La Exce, Feid, Zion
"Sigues Con Él"	2019	Arcángel and Sech
"Ta Ta Ta"	2020	De La Ghetto, Kafu Banton, Luigi 21 Plus, Rich Music LTD, Ñejo
"Pirueta"	2020	Arcángel, Chencho Corleone featuring Wisin & Yandel, Myke Towers
"Girl Like You"	2021	J.I the Prince N.Y, Sech, and Tyga
"Mírame" (Bilmem Mi? remix)	2022	Sefo, Reik, and Aerro
