= Sech (singer) =

Panamanian singer

- Born: Carlos Isaías Morales Williams; December 3, 1993 (age 32); Río Abajo, Panama
- Genres: Reggaeton; Latin pop; dancehall; Latin R&B
- Occupations: Singer, songwriter, record producer
- Instruments: Vocals; piano
- Years active: 2014–present
- Labels: Rich; Rimas

Carlos Isaías Morales Williams (born December 3, 1993), better known as Sech, is a Panamanian singer, songwriter and record producer. He is from the Río Abajo township of Panama City and is best known for his single "Otro Trago", which was nominated for Best Urban Song and Best Urban Fusion/Performance at the 2019 Latin Grammy Awards. He has collaborated with numerous Latin artists including Maluma, Anitta, Nicky Jam, Daddy Yankee, and Bad Bunny. He released his debut studio album Sueños in April 2019 and his second album 1 of 1 was released on May 21, 2020.

== Early life ==
Carlos Isaías Morales Williams was born the youngest of four children in the Río Abajo township of Panama City to parents who were both pastors. He developed his singing voice while singing in his church's choir. He additionally enjoyed writing poetry and singing along to the music of Boyz II Men. After high school, he worked in the food service and construction industries while producing music on the side with his friend Focking Rafita. He began his musical career in Panama as a street vendor who also sang to customers. Morales started his career in the group Los Principiantes. At age 14, he released "Te Llamaba" with the group in June 2008.

== Musical career ==
=== 2014–2018: Solo career, Rich Music, and national success ===
In 2014, Sech released his debut single "Yo Sin Ti". Between 2014 and 2017, Sech began releasing new songs until the release of "Miss Lonely", which became his first national hit and gave him his national recognition. The song went viral in Colombia and attracted the attention of producer and DJ Dímelo Flow. Following this, Sech was signed to Rich Music in 2017, and in December of that year, he released his first mixtape album, titled The Sensation Mixtape.

Sech's debut extended play The Sensation, was released on December 6, 2018. Consisting of 8 songs, the album includes the singles "Me Gustaría", "La Vida" and the original version of "Que Más Pues", which its remix would be included on his following release. The album also features guest appearances from International artists, including Justin Quiles, Jowell & Randy and Dalex.

=== 2019–2023: Debut album and international recognition ===
In April 2019, Sech released "Otro Trago". The song reached number one in his native Panama, as well in Spain, Argentina, Colombia, Peru, Paraguay, Honduras and Mexico. It also became Sech's first entry on the US Billboard Hot 100 peaking at number 34. Sech describes "Otro Trago" as "the song that truly changed [his] life". The track was nominated for Best Urban Song and Best Urban Fusion/Performance at the 2019 Latin Grammy Awards. That same month, Sech released his debut studio album Sueños, which reached number three on the Billboard Top Latin Albums chart. The album includes the Panamanian top 10 single "Solita" featuring Farruko and Zion & Lennox. It also includes the remix of the song "Qué Más Pues" featuring Maluma, Nicky Jam, Lenny Tavárez, Justin Quiles and Dalex. Sueños was ranked number three on the Rolling Stone list of the "25 Best Latin Albums of 2019". In August 2019, Suzy Exposito of Rolling Stone noted that Sech is "rapidly becoming urbano's most wanted collaborator".

He featured on Nicky Jam's 2019 Íntimo album on the song "Atrévete", released in November 2019. The song peaked at number four in Sech's native Panama. Sech also appeared on the song "Ignorantes" with Bad Bunny, included on Bad Bunny's album YHLQMDLG. The song reached the top ten in Panama, Spain and the US Billboard Hot Latin Songs chart, and peaked at number 49 on the US Billboard Hot 100. Other songs Sech was featured includes "Definitivamente" with Daddy Yankee, and "Ganas De Ti" with Wisin & Yandel, with both songs peaking at number two in Panama.

During a Zoom listening party on May 7, 2020, Sech announced that his second studio album, 1 of 1 would be released on May 21, 2020. The album's lead single, "Si Te Vas" with Ozuna, reached the top ten in Panama and Spain. The album also includes the Panamanian top 10 single "Relación" and features appearances from Daddy Yankee, Arcángel, Nando Boom, and Lenny Tavárez. Sech explained that the album also includes "throwbacks to Panama's classic reggae en español sound". "Relación" became Sech's fourth top 10 on the Hot Latin Songs chart and his first solo song to do so. The song also garnered popularity on the video-sharing app TikTok.

On April 15, 2021, Sech released his third studio album called 42, an 11 track album with features from Rauw Alejandro, Wisin, Yandel, Arcángel, and Nicky Jam. The name of this album was chosen as a tribute to Jackie Robinson, who was the first African American in the MLB. The number also has significance to Sech because of how it was passed on to Panamanian baseball player, Mariano Rivera. In the same year, he released "Volando (Remix)" with Bad Bunny and Mora, Una Nota with J Balvin, "Tus Lágrimas" with Mora, and "Se Le Ve" with Dímelo Flow, Justin Quiles, Lenny Tavárez, Arcángel, De La Ghetto, and Dalex. At the end of 2021, Sech and DJ Khaled released the song "Borracho".

In 2022, Sech released the single "Noche De Teteo". In June, Sech announced that the name for his upcoming album would be "Bienvenidos al Bloke." On September 21, 2023, Sech released his EP El Bloke Hills.

=== 2024–present: Rimas Entertainment and fourth and fifth albums ===
On October 24, 2024, Sech released single "Toy Perdio" after signing with Rimas Entertainment. On November 29, he released his fourth studio album Tranki, Todo Pasa.

On August 3, 2025, Sech joined Bad Bunny onstage for the latter's San Juan residency No Me Quiero Ir de Aquí to perform their collaboration "Ignorantes" as well as his own hits "Otro Trago", "911", and "Sal y Perrea".

On September 25, Sech released the single "París" with fellow Panamanian singer Boza, with Boza stating "All of Panama wanted us to [collaborate], and now it's finally come to life." On December 9, Sech headlined an Amazon City Session in New York. On December 11, Sech released his fourth EP, Esa Noche Terminó de Día, with features from Danny Ocean and Myke Towers as well as a reunion of The Academy collaborators Dalex, Dímelo Flow, Lenny Tavárez, and Justin Quiles.

On May 14, 2026, Sech released his fifth solo album Secho Gang with features including Ryan Castro, Jay Wheeler, and Kris R.

== Musical style ==
Sech possesses a tenor vocal range. A Billboard staff member wrote that Sech's music contains "soothing vocals, sensual urban fusion melodies, and lyrics that focus on romance, dreams and positive vibes". In an interview with Billboard, Sech mentioned El General as being an influence on his music. "Otro Trago" was described by Rolling Stone as a "piano-reggaeton ballad about drinking and dancing the heartbreak away". Sech is a fan of jazz music and expressed a desire to incorporate jazz music into his compositions. He described his musical experimentation by saying, "Everything changes so fast. Today, we're singing reggaeton. Tomorrow, we'll be singing in Arabic! You never know where things are gonna go, and that's an exciting challenge".

== Discography ==
Solo studio albums

- Sueños (2019)
- 1 of 1 (2020)
- 42 (2021)
- Tranki, Todo Pasa (2024)
- Secho Gang (2026)

Collaborative studio albums

- The Academy: Segunda Misión (with Dímelo Flow, Dalex, Justin Quiles, and Lenny Tavárez) (2024)

== Awards and nominations ==
Award	Year	Recipient(s) and nominee(s)	Category	Result	Ref.
Billboard Music Awards	2020	Sueños	Top Latin Album	Nominated	
Billboard Music Awards	2020	"Otro Trago (Remix)" (with Darell, Nicky Jam, Ozuna, Anuel AA)	Top Latin Song	Nominated	
Billboard Latin Music Awards	2020	Himself	New Artist of the Year	Won	
Billboard Latin Music Awards	2020	"Otro Trago (Remix)" (with Darell, Nicky Jam, Ozuna, Anuel AA)	Hot Latin Song of the Year	Nominated	
Billboard Latin Music Awards	2020	"Otro Trago (Remix)" (with Darell, Nicky Jam, Ozuna, Anuel AA)	Vocal Event Hot Latin Song of the Year	Nominated	
Billboard Latin Music Awards	2020	"Otro Trago (Remix)" (with Darell, Nicky Jam, Ozuna, Anuel AA)	Streaming Song of the Year	Nominated	
Billboard Latin Music Awards	2020	"Otro Trago (Remix)" (with Darell, Nicky Jam, Ozuna, Anuel AA)	Latin Rhythm Song of the Year	Nominated	
Billboard Latin Music Awards	2020	Sueños	Top Latin Album of the Year	Nominated	
Billboard Latin Music Awards	2020	Sueños	Latin Rhythm Album of the Year	Nominated	
Latin American Music Awards	2019	Himself	New Artist of the Year	Nominated	
Latin American Music Awards	2021	Himself	Artist of the Year	Nominated	
Latin American Music Awards	2023	"Borracho" (with DJ Khaled)	Collaboration Crossover of the Year	Nominated	
Latin Grammy Awards	2019	"Otro Trago" (with Darell)	Best Urban Fusion/Performance	Nominated	
Latin Grammy Awards	2019	"Otro Trago" (with Darell)	Best Urban Song	Nominated	
Latin Grammy Awards	2019	Sueños	Best Urban Music Album	Nominated	
Latin Grammy Awards	2020	"Si Te Vas" (with Ozuna)	Best Reggaeton Performance	Nominated	
Latin Grammy Awards	2020	1 of 1	Best Urban Music Album	Nominated	
Latin Grammy Awards	2021	"A Fuego" (as songwriter)	Best Urban Song	Nominated	
Latin Grammy Awards	2022	Dharma (as songwriter)	Album of the Year	Nominated	
MTV MIAW Awards	2021	"Relación (Remix)" (with Daddy Yankee, J Balvin, Rosalía, & Farruko)	Hit of the Year	Nominated	
Premios Juventud	2019	Himself	The New Urban Generation	Nominated	
Premios Juventud	2020	Himself	#Stay Home Concert	Won	
Premios Juventud	2021	"Relación (Remix)" (with Daddy Yankee, J Balvin, Rosalía, & Farruko)	Viral Track of the Year	Nominated	
Premios Juventud	2021	"Relación (Remix)" (with Daddy Yankee, J Balvin, Rosalía, & Farruko)	La Mezcla Perfecta	Won	
Premios Juventud	2021	"Porfa (Remix)" (with Feid, J Balvin, Maluma, Nicky Jam &Justin Quiles)	La Mezcla Perfecta	Nominated	
Premios Juventud	2022	Himself	Male Artist – On the Rise	Nominated	
Premios Juventud	2022	"Una Nota" (with J Balvin)	The Perfect Mix	Nominated	
Premios Juventud	2023	"Noche de Teteo"	Best Urban Track	Nominated	
Premios Juventud	2025	Tranki, Todo Pasa	Best Urban Album	Nominated	
Premios Juventud	2025	"Priti" (with Danny Ocean)	Best Pop/Urban Song	Nominated	
Premios Lo Nuestro	2020	Himself	New Artist – Male	Nominated	
Premios Lo Nuestro	2020	"Otro Trago (Remix)" (with Darell, Nicky Jam, Ozuna, Anuel AA)	Remix of the Year	Nominated	
Premios Lo Nuestro	2021	Himself	Male Urban Artist of the Year	Nominated	
Premios Lo Nuestro	2021	"Qué Lástima" (with ChocQuibTown)	Video of the Year	Nominated	
Premios Lo Nuestro	2021	"Relación (Remix)" (with Daddy Yankee, J Balvin, Rosalía, & Farruko)	Remix of the Year	Nominated	
Premios Lo Nuestro	2021	"Porfa (Remix)" (with Feid, J Balvin, Maluma, Nicky Jam &Justin Quiles)	Remix of the Year	Nominated	
Premios Lo Nuestro	2021	"Sigues Con Él" (with Arcángel)	Urban Song of the Year	Nominated	
Premios Lo Nuestro	2021	"Sigues Con Él" (with Arcángel)	Urban Collaboration of the Year	Nominated	
Premios Lo Nuestro	2021	1 of 1	Urban Album of the Year	Nominated	
Premios Lo Nuestro	2022	"911 (Remix)" (with Jhayco)	Remix of the Year	Nominated	
Premios Lo Nuestro	2022	"La Toxica (Remix)" (with Farruko, Myke Towers, Jay Wheeler & Tempo)	Remix of the Year	Nominated	
Premios Lo Nuestro	2023	"Una Nota" (with J Balvin)	Song of the Year	Nominated	
Premios Lo Nuestro	2023	"Una Nota" (with J Balvin)	Urban Collaboration of the Year	Nominated	
Premios Lo Nuestro	2023	"Sal y Perrea (Remix)" (with Daddy Yankee & J Balvin)	Remix of the Year	Won	
Premios Lo Nuestro	2024	"5 Estrellas" (with Reik)	Urban/Pop Song of the Year	Nominated	
Premios Tu Música Urbano	2020	Himself	Top Revelation - Male	Nominated	
Premios Tu Música Urbano	2020	"Otro Trago" (with Darell)	Song of the Year	Nominated	
Premios Tu Música Urbano	2020	"Otro Trago" (with Darell)	Song of the Year - New Generation	Won	
Premios Tu Música Urbano	2020	"Quizás" (with Dalex, Lenny Tavarez, Justin Quiles, Wisin, Feid & Zion)	Song of the Year - Duo or Group	Nominated	
Premios Tu Música Urbano	2020	"Otro Trago (Remix)" (with Darell, Nicky Jam, Ozuna, Anuel AA)	Remix of the Year	Nominated	
Premios Tu Música Urbano	2020	"Si Se Da (Remix)" (with Myke Towers, Farruko, Arcángel & Zion)	Remix of the Year - New Generation	Nominated	
Premios Tu Música Urbano	2020	"Atrévete" (with Nicky Jam)	Collaboration of the Year	Nominated	
Premios Tu Música Urbano	2020	"Si Te Vas" (with Ozuna)	Collaboration of the Year - New Generation	Won	
Premios Tu Música Urbano	2020	Sueños	Album of the Year - New Generation	Nominated	
Premios Tu Música Urbano	2020	The Academy	Album of the Year - New Generation	Nominated	
Premios Tu Música Urbano	2022	Himself	Top Artist - Male	Nominated	
Premios Tu Música Urbano	2022	"Volando (Remix)" (with Bad Bunny & Mora)	Remix of the Year	Nominated	
Premios Tu Música Urbano	2022	"Sal y Perrea (Remix)" (with Daddy Yankee & J Balvin)	Remix of the Year	Nominated	
Premios Tu Música Urbano	2022	"911 (Remix)" (with Jhayco)	Remix of the Year	Nominated	
Premios Tu Música Urbano	2022	"Una Nota" (with J Balvin)	Collaboration of the Year	Nominated	
Premios Tu Música Urbano	2022	42	Album of the Year - Male	Nominated	
Premios Tu Música Urbano	2023	"En La De Ella" (with Jhayco & Feid)	Collaboration of the Year	Nominated	
Premios Tu Música Urbano	2023	"Desde Mis Ojos (Remix)” (with Chris Lebrón & Jay Wheeler)	Remix of the Year	Nominated	

== See also ==
- List of Afro-Latinos
- Number-one singles of 2019 (Panama)
