= Rich Music =

American independent record label

Rich Music is an American independent record label founded by entrepreneur Richard Méndez and his son, Joshua Méndez, in 2007, based in Miami.

In February 2017, the label signed a distribution deal with Warner Music Latina. In April of the same year, Rich Music was nominated Latin Label of the Year at the Billboard Latin Music Awards.

Currently, artists signed to the label include Justin Quiles, Sech, Dalex, Dímelo Flow (formerly known as DJ Flow), and Magnifico "The Beat Monsta"
