= Lenny Tavárez =

Puerto Rican singer (born 1987)

- Tavárez at the 27th Annual Latin Grammy Awards, 2026

Background information
- Born: Julio Manuel González Tavárez; May 19, 1987 (age 39); San Juan, Puerto Rico
- Genres: Reggaeton; Latin R&B; Latin trap; Latin pop
- Occupations: Singer; songwriter; record producer; dancer
- Instrument: Vocals
- Years active: 2001–present
- Labels: Litmless; KristoMan; Warner Latina
- Formerly of: Dyland & Lenny
- Partner: Natasha Nazario (2019–present)
- Website: www.lennytavarez.com

Julio Manuel González Tavárez (born May 19, 1987), better known by his stage name Lenny Tavárez, is a Puerto Rican singer, songwriter, record producer and dancer. He was part of the duo Dyland & Lenny. He began a solo career in 2013 and later became known for collaborations such as "Nena Maldición", "Hola" (remix), "Toda" (remix), "Medallo", "Pa Mí" (remix), "En Tu Cuerpo" (remix), and "Elegí".

In 2019 he participated in the collaborative EP The Academy as part of the supergroup The Avengers, also made up of Sech, Dalex, Justin Quiles and Feid, which reached number 11 on the Billboard Top Latin Albums chart. In 2024, a sequel to the album titled The Academy: Segunda Misión was released excluding Feid, which peaked at number 18 on the aforementioned chart.

== Discography ==
=== Studio albums ===
- Krack (2021)
- Brillar (2024)
- 8 (2026)

=== Extended plays ===
- Pop Porn (2017)

=== Collaborative albums ===
- The Academy (2019)
- The Academy: Segunda Misión (2024)

== Nominations ==
Award	Year	Category	Nominated work	Result	Ref.
Juventud Awards	2022	Viral Track of the Year	"Medallo" (with Blessd and Justin Quiles)	Nominated	
Juventud Awards	2022	Male Artist - On the Rise	Himself	Nominated	
Lo Nuestro Awards	2021	Remix of the Year	"DJ, No Pare" (remix) (with Justin Quiles, Natti Natasha, Farruko, Zion and Dalex)	Nominated	
Lo Nuestro Awards	2023	Song of the Year	"Medallo" (with Blessd and Justin Quiles)	Nominated	
Lo Nuestro Awards	2023	Urban Collaboration of the Year	"Medallo" (with Blessd and Justin Quiles)	Nominated	
Latin Grammy Awards	2025	Best Reggaeton Performance	"Brillar"	Nominated	[7]
