= Bryant Myers discography =

Discography of Puerto Rican rapper

- Studio albums: 2
- EPs: 1
- Singles: 136
- Collaborative albums: 1

The discography of Puerto Rican rapper Bryant Myers consists of two studio albums, one collaborative album, one extended play, and 136 singles (including 71 as a featured artist).

== Albums ==
=== Studio albums ===
List of studio albums, with selected chart positions
Title	Album details	Peak chart positions		
Title	Album details	US	US Latin	SPA
La Oscuridad	Released: July 27, 2018; Labels: La Commission LLC, Entertainment One U.S.; Format: Streaming, digital download	177	4	52
Bendecido	Released: October 30, 2020; Labels: Entertainment One U.S.; Format: Streaming, digital download	—	16	17
Millo Gángster Club	Released: July 25, 2025; Labels: La Familia; Format: Streaming, digital download	—	—	5

=== Collaborative albums ===
List of collaborative albums, with selected chart positions
Title	Album details	Peak chart positions
Title	Album details	US Latin Rhythm
Wise the Gold Pen Presents: Trap Miami (as part of Los Eleven)	Released: November 11, 2016; Labels: Sony Music Latin; Format: Streaming, digital download	6

== Extended plays ==
List of extended plays, with selected chart positions
Title	Album details	Peak chart positions	
Title	Album details	US Latin	SPA
Cambio de Clima (with Miky Woodz)	Released: February 8, 2019; Labels: La Commission LLC; Format: Streaming, digital download	20	34

== Singles ==
=== As lead artist ===
List of singles as lead artist, with selected chart positions
Title	Year	Peak chart positions		Certifications	Album
Title	Year	US Latin	SPA	Certifications	Album
"Por Qué Sigues con Él" (or remix featuring Kevin Roldán)	2016	— (Note: "Por Qué Sigues con Él" did not enter the Hot Latin Songs chart, but did peak at #14 on the Tropical Songs chart.)	—		Non-album singles
"Caile" (with Revol and Bad Bunny featuring Zion and De La Ghetto)	2016	—	—	RIAA: 2× Platinum (Latin)	Non-album singles
"Otra Mujer" (with Ñengo Flow)	2017	—	—		Non-album singles
"Bajen pa' ca" (featuring Noriel)	2017	—	—	RIAA: Gold (Latin)	Non-album singles
"Un Ratito Más" (with Bad Bunny)	2017	—	—	RIAA: Gold (Latin)	Non-album singles
"Háblame Claro" (featuring Ñejo)	2017	—	—		Non-album singles
"Pa Pasar El Rato"	2017	— (Note: "Pa Pasar El Rato" did not enter the Hot Latin Songs chart, but did peak at #31 on the Latin Pop Songs chart.)	—		La Oscuridad
"Volvamos Hablar"	2017	—	—		La Oscuridad
"Como Los Tiempos de Antes" (with Benny Benni and Kendo Kaponi featuring Endo, C.H., Amarion, Pacho, Juanka, and Poulriyc)	2017	—	—		Non-album single
"Ojalá" (with De La Ghetto, Darell, and Almighty)	2017	—	—	RIAA: Gold (Latin)	La Oscuridad
"Deseos" (with Jhay Cortez)	2018	—	—	RIAA: Gold (Latin)	Eyez on Me
"Me Han Hablau de Ti" (featuring Miky Woodz)	2018	—	—		La Oscuridad
"Vamos a Vernos" (with Gigolo y la Exce and Jon Z)	2018	—	—		La Oscuridad
"Te Besaré" (with Jonathan Moly)	2018	—	—		13
"Como Una 40" (with Joniel El Lethal and Baby Rasta)	2018	—	—		Non-album single
"Momentos" (with Cosculluela)	2018	—	—		La Oscuridad
"Bryant Myers"	2018	—	—		La Oscuridad
"Ponle Música" (with Plan B)	2018	—	—		La Oscuridad
"Triste" (with Bad Bunny)	2018	35	70	RIAA: 2× Platinum (Latin)	La Oscuridad
"Soltero" (with Jon Z, Baby Rasta, and Cosculluela)	2018	—	—	RIAA: Gold	Non-album singles
"Cadela" (with Nacho, Dayme y El High, MC Bin Laden, and Almighty)	2018	—	—		Non-album singles
"Te Besaré" (Salsa Remix) (with Jonathan Moly and Mike Bahía featuring Andy Rivera)	2018	—	—		13
"Tanta Falta" (or remix with Nicky Jam)	2018	47	14	RIAA: Gold (Latin); PROMUSICAE: Gold	Non-album singles
"Acapella" (with El Alfa, Jon Z, Myke Towers, and Almighty)	2019	—	—		Non-album singles
"Bandolera" (with Alex Rose)	2019	—	—		Non-album singles
"Animal" (with Eladio Carrión)	2019	—	—		Non-album singles
"Se Nota" (with Juhn and Miky Woodz featuring Lary Over)	2019	—	—	RIAA: Gold (Latin)	Non-album singles
"Hasta Abajo" (with Kevin Roldán and Lyanno)	2019	—	—	RIAA: Platinum (Latin)	Kring
"Gan-Ga" (or remix with Anuel AA)	2019	11	14	RIAA: 2× Platinum (Latin); PROMUSICAE: Platinum; PROMUSICAE: Platinum (remix)	Bendecido
"Mis Días Sin Ti" (with Rauw Alejandro)	2019	—	—		Non-album singles
"Wow" (or remix with Nicky Jam and El Alfa featuring Arcángel and Darell)	2020	36	88		Non-album singles
"Narcotics" (with Dei V)	2023	—	29	PROMUSICAE: 2× Platinum	
"Duro Ma" (with Dei V and Saiko)	2025	—	28		

=== As featured artist ===
List of singles as featured artist, with selected chart positions
Title	Year	Peak chart positions		Certifications	Album
Title	Year	US Latin	SPA	Certifications	Album
"Ella y Yo" (Pepe Quintana featuring Farruko, Tempo, Anuel AA, Almighty, and Bryant Myers)	2016	34	—	RIAA: Platinum (Latin)	Non-album single
"Maltrato" (Sou El Flotador featuring Bryant Myers and Lary Over)	2016	—	—		Mr. Fly
"Volverte A Ver" (Nio García featuring Anuel AA and Bryant Myers)	2016	—	—		Non-album single
"Bebiendo y Fumando" (Los Oidos Fresh featuring Bryant Myers, J Alvarez, and Anonimus)	2016	—	—		The Latest Hits
"Sin Ropa" (Remix) (Benyo El Multi featuring Ñengo Flow, Anonimus, and Bryant Myers)	2016	—	—		Non-album single
"Tú Me Enamoraste" (Remix) (Lary Over featuring Anuel AA, Bryant Myers, Almighty, and Brytiago)	2016	—	—	RIAA: Platinum (Latin)	Real Hasta La Muerte: The Mixtape
"Ahora Me Llama" (Remix) (Juhn featuring Bryant Myers, Anonimus, Noriel, Brytiago, and Miky Woodz)	2016	—	—	RIAA: Gold (Latin)	Non-album singles
"Juguetona" (Allstar Remix) (Yomo featuring Farruko, Bryant Myers, Juanka, Dozi, Kendo Kaponi, Anonimus, Almighty, and Pusho)	2016	—	—		Non-album singles
"Háblame" (Dvice featuring Juanka, Lyan, Bryant Myers, and Anuel AA)	2016	—	—		Non-album singles
"Groserias" (Dayme y El High featuring Gaviria, Polako, Bryant Myers, and Anonimus)	2016	—	—		Non-album singles
"Vente Encima" (Riko featuring Anonimus, Bryant Myers, and Noriel)	2016	—	—		Non-album singles
"La Llamada" (Remix) (Noriel featuring Brytiago, Bryant Myers, Darkiel, and Almighty)	2016	—	—		Trap Capos: Season 1
"Desnúdate" (Lary Over featuring Bryant Myers and Jahzel)	2016	—	—		Non-album singles
"Caribe Hilton" (Lary Over featuring Bryant Myers)	2016	—	—		Non-album singles
"Nos Quieren Ver Mal" (Brytiago featuring Bryant Myers and Almighty)	2016	—	—		Non-album singles
"Ella y Yo" (Remix) (Pepe Quintana featuring Farruko, Ozuna, Arcángel, Anuel AA, Bryant Myers, Kevin Roldán, Ñengo Flow, Alexis La Bestia, and Ñejo)	2016	—	—	RIAA: Gold (Latin)	Non-album singles
"Hendrix" (Spanglish Remix) (Wyclef Jean featuring Farina, Bryant Myers, and Anonimus)	2016	—	—		Non-album singles
"Háblame 2" (Dvice featuring Alex Kyza, Darkiel, Ñengo Flow, Anuel AA, Bryant Myers, Lary Over, Almighty, Juanka, Lyan, and J King)	2016	—	—		Non-album singles
"Maliante HP" (Remix) (Benny Benni and Anuel AA featuring Farruko, Almighty, Darkiel, Bryant Myers, Nio García, and Noriel)	2016	—	—		Non-album singles
"Culpable" (Remix) (Mike Duran featuring Anuel AA, Kevin Roldán, Bryant Myers, Noriel, and Darkiel)	2016	—	—		Non-album singles
"La Para Bi" (Benny Benni and Ozuna featuring Farruko, Juanka, and Bryant Myers)	2016	—	—		Non-album singles
"Cuatro Babys" (Maluma featuring Noriel, Bryant Myers, and Juhn)	2016	15	55	RIAA: 12× Diamond (Latin); PROMUSICAE: Gold	Trap Capos: Season 1
"Si Ellos Supieran" (Farina featuring Bryant Myers)	2016	—	—		Non-album singles
"Ay Mami" (Tito "El Bambino" featuring Bryant Myers)	2016	— (Note: "Ay Mami" did not enter the Hot Latin Songs chart, but did peak at #24 on the Latin Rhythm Airplay chart.)	—	RIAA: Gold (Latin)	Non-album singles
"Coronamos" (Remix) (El Taiger featuring Bryant Myers and Bad Bunny)	2016	—	—		Non-album singles
"El Lío Remix" (Cal-K Boy featuring Bryant Myers, Anonimus, Gigolo y la Exce, Gio Rosse, and Paulino Reyes)	2016	—	—		Non-album singles
"Quién Eres Tú" (Sou El Flotador featuring Randy and Bryant Myers)	2016	—	—		Mr. Fly, Vol. 2
"Borracho y Loco" (Nio García featuring Bryant Myers and Randy)	2016	—	—		Non-album singles
"Pa' Ti" (Bad Bunny featuring Bryant Myers)	2016	—	—		Non-album singles
"Que Tengo Que Hacer" (Mark B featuring Bryant Myers)	2016	—	—		Non-album singles
"Kumbia King" (Ñejo featuring Bryant Myers and Jamby "El Favo")	2017	—	—		Non-album singles
"Po' Encima" (Arcángel featuring Bryant Myers)	2017	—	—		Non-album singles
"Me Llueven 3.0" (Bad Bunny featuring Kevin Roldán, Noriel, Bryant Myers, and Almighty)	2017	—	—		Non-album singles
"Yo También" (TrapCartel featuring Arcángel, Pusho, Bryant Myers, Gotay, Noriel, and Anonimus)	2017	—	—		Non-album singles
"Me Mata" (Bad Bunny, Mambo Kingz, and DJ Luian featuring Arcángel, Almighty, Bryant Myers, Noriel, Baby Rasta, and Brytiago)	2017	—	—		Non-album singles
"Coronamos" (El Taiger and J Balvin featuring Cosculluela, Bad Bunny, and Bryant Myers)	2017	—	—		Non-album singles
"Hablale" (Remix) (D-Enyel featuring Alexio, Ozuna, Bryant Myers, and Brytiago)	2017	—	—		Non-album singles
"Dile a Tu Marido" (Remix) (DM featuring Brytiago, Bryant Myers, Eloy, Lary Over, Lyan, Miky Woodz, and Juhn)	2017	—	—		Non-album singles
"No Quiere Amor" (Remix) (Lenny Tavárez featuring Farruko, Bryant Myers, Lary Over, and Lito Kirino)	2017	—	—		Non-album singles
"La Mia" (Remix) (Nio García featuring Juhn, Farruko, Baby Rasta, Bryant Myers, Darkiel, Casper Mágico, Darell, and Lary Over)	2017	—	—		Non-album singles
"Apaga el Celular" (Juhn featuring Bryant Myers)	2017	—	—		Non-album singles
"La Calle" (Blingz featuring Darell, Bryant Myers, and D.OZI)	2017	—	—		Non-album singles
"Me Llueven" (Extended Version) (Bad Bunny featuring El Poeta Callejero, Mark B, Almighty, Denyerkin, Quimico Ultra Mega, El Fother, Bryant Myers, Noriel & Kevin Roldán)	2017	—	—		Non-album singles
"Pa Eso" (Reykon featuring Bryant Myers)	2017	—	—		Non-album singles
"Obsession" (Spanish Remix) (Super Yei featuring Bryant Myers, Anonimus, Young Izak, and Sam Sage)	2017	—	—		Non-album singles
"Pure" (Farruko featuring Bad Bunny, Bryant Myers, Ez El Ezeta, and DJ Luian)	2017	—	—		Non-album singles
"Armao 100pre Andamos" (Remix) (Anuel AA and The Secret Panda featuring Ñengo Flow, Darell, Bryant Myers, Alexio & Juanka)	2017	—	—		Non-album singles
"Dentro de Ti" (Franco El Gorila featuring Bryant Myers, Anonimus, and Eloy)	2017	—	—		Non-album singles
"Tacos Altos" (Farruko, Arcángel, and Noriel featuring Bryant Myers and Alex Gargolas)	2017	—	—	RIAA: Gold (Latin)	Non-album singles
"Banda de Camión" (Remix) (El Alfa, Farruko, and De La Ghetto featuring Villano Sam, Bryant Myers, Zion, and Noriel)	2017	—	—	RIAA: Gold (Latin)	Non-album singles
"Volver a Verte" (Sinfónico and Ñengo Flow featuring Bryant Myers)	2017	—	—		Non-album singles
"8" (Remix) (Almighty featuring Bryant Myers, Pusho, Randy, Kendo, Noriel, Ñengo Flow, and Juanka)	2017	—	—		Non-album singles
"Envidiosos" (Dímelo Flow featuring Dalex, Justin Quiles, Bryant Myers, Farruko, and Kelmitt)	2018	—	—		Non-album singles
"Maltrato" (Remix) (Sou El Flotador featuring Lary Over, Bryant Myers, Baby Rasta, Miky Woodz, and Juhn)	2018	—	—		Mr. Fly, Vol. 2
"No Love" (Noriel and Prince Royce featuring Bryant Myers)	2018	—	—		Trap Capos II
"Me Dieron Ganas" (Maximus Wel featuring Bryant Myers)	2018	—	—		Non-album singles
"Hagámoslo" (Green Cookie featuring Bryant Myers)	2018	—	—		Non-album singles
"Quiero Hablarte" (Darell featuring Bryant Myers)	2018	—	—		Non-album singles
"Te Descuidó" (Barbosa featuring Bad Bunny and Bryant Myers)	2018	—	—		Non-album singles
"Noche Para Chingar" (El Sica featuring Lil Santana and Bryant Myers)	2018	—	—		Non-album singles
"Deseos" (Remix) (Jhay Cortez, Nio García, and Casper Mágico featuring Bryant Myers)	2018	—	—		Non-album singles
"Darte" (Remix) (Alex Rose and Casper Mágico featuring Myke Towers, Ñengo Flow, Bryant Myers, Noriel, Miky Woodz, Juhn Allstar, and Jhay Cortez)	2018	—	—		Non-album singles
"Suave" (Remix) (El Alfa featuring Bryant Myers, Jon Z, Miky Woodz, and Chencho)	2018	—	—		El Hombre
"Un Flow Así" (Fuego and Lito Kirino featuring Bryant Myers, Liro 100, and Yulian)	2018	—	—		Un Solo Movimiento
"Millones" (Arcángel, Jay Menez, and Jon Z featuring Bryant Myers, El Alfa, Mozart La Para, DJ Luian, and Mambo Kingz)	2018	—	—		Non-album singles
"No Somos Ná" (Remix) (Noriel featuring Gigolo y La Exce, Bryant Myers, Alex Rose, Juhn, and Amenazzy)	2018	—	—		Non-album singles
"Noche Loca" (Remix) (Öken, Myke Towers, and Mora featuring Bryant Myers, De La Ghetto, Juhn, and Noriel)	2018	—	—		Non-album singles
"Costear" (Equipo Rojo Remix) (Jhay Cortez, Almighty, and Juanka featuring Bryant Myers, Rauw Alejandro, Justin Quiles, Lyanno, Eladio Carrion, and Joyce Santana)	2019	—	—		Non-album singles
"Mantecado de Coco" (Nio García, Arcángel, and Young Blade featuring Bryant Myers)	2019	—	—	RIAA: Gold (Latin)	Non-album singles
"El Efecto (Remix)" (Rauw Alejandro, Chencho Corleone, and Kevvo featuring Lyanno, Bryant Myers, and Dalex)	2019	—	49	PROMUSICAE: Gold	Non-album singles
"Pacto (Remix)" (Jay Wheeler, Anuel AA and Hades66 featuring Bryant Myers and Dei V)	2023	29	29	PROMUSICAE: Platinum	TRAPPii

== Other charted songs ==
List of other charted songs, with selected chart positions
Title	Year	Peak chart positions	Certifications	Album
Title	Year	SPA	Certifications	Album
"Ganas Sobran" (with Miky Woodz featuring Justin Quiles)	2019	20	PROMUSICAE: Platinum	Cambio de Clima
"Seda" (with Bad Bunny)	2023	6	PROMUSICAE: Platinum	Nadie Sabe Lo Que Va a Pasar Mañana

== Guest appearances ==
List of non-single guest appearances, showing other artist(s), year released and album name
Title	Year	Other artist(s)	Album
"Quieres Enamorarme"	2016	Noriel, Juhn, Baby Rasta	Trap Capos: Season 1
"Ninguno Se Monta"	2016	Darell, Anuel AA, Tempo, Juanka, Lito Kirino	La Verdadera Vuelta
"La Pegajosa"	2017	El Alfa	Disciplina
"No Somos Ná"	2018	Noriel, Gigolo y La Exce	Trap Capos II
"Porque Te Mientes"	2018	Noriel, Gadiel	Trap Capos II
"Fuego"	2018	Kendo Kaponi, Noriel, Pacho El Antifeka, Anonimus	El Alfa y el Omega
"No Te Detengas"	2018	Messiah, Miky Woodz	B.E.N.I.T.O.
"Te Quiero Rovar"	2018	Zzinfu	Soy Urbano
"Mucho Humo"	2019	Farruko, Jo Mersa Marley	Gangalee
"En el Carro"	2019	Almighty	La Bestia
"Ella Se Va"	2019	Nacho, Lyanno, Rauw Alejandro	Uno
"Hoodie"	2022	Anuel AA	LLNM2
