= Myke Towers discography =

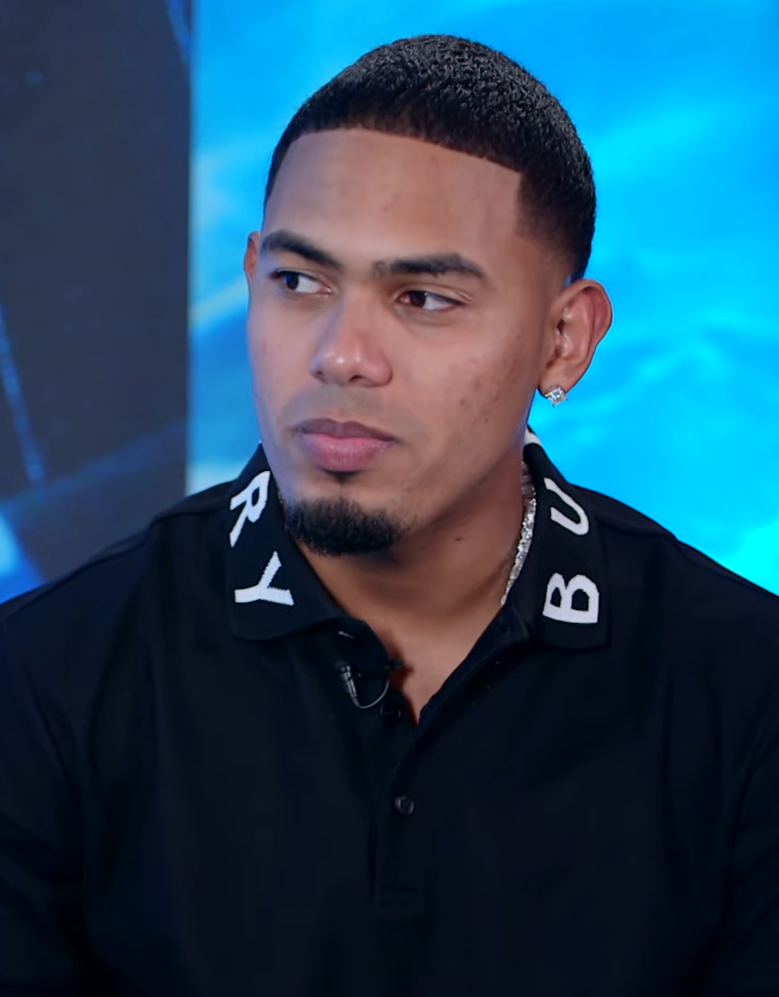
- Myke Towers in 2021
- Studio albums: 7
- Singles: 106

Puerto Rican rapper and singer Myke Towers has released seven studio albums and 107 singles.

== Studio albums ==
List of studio albums with selected details
Title	Details	Peak chart positions			Certifications
Title	Details	US	US Latin	SPA	Certifications
Easy Money Baby	Released: January 24, 2020; Labels: White World; Format: CD, digital download, streaming	55	1	5	RIAA: 3× Platinum (Latin); PROMUSICAE: Platinum
Lyke Mike	Released: April 23, 2021; Labels: One World, Warner Latina, Warner; Format: CD, digital download, streaming	36	3	4	RIAA: 2× Platinum (Latin)
La Vida Es Una	Released: March 23, 2023; Labels: One World, Warner Latina, Warner; Format: CD, digital download, streaming	173	9	4	RIAA: 4× Platinum (Latin); PROMUSICAE: Gold
LVEU: Vive la Tuya... No la Mía	Released: November 23, 2023; Labels: One World, Warner Latina, Warner; Format: CD, digital download, streaming	156	9	3	RIAA: 5× Platinum (Latin)
La Pantera Negra	Released: August 22, 2024; Labels: One World, Warner Latina, Warner; Format: CD, digital download, streaming	82	7	2	RIAA: 2× Platinum (Latin); PROMUSICAE: Gold
Lyke Miike	Released: December 25, 2024; Labels: One World, Warner Latina, Warner; Format: Digital download, streaming	—	—	8	PROMUSICAE: Gold
Island Boyz	Released: July 18, 2025; Labels: One World, Warner Latina, Warner; Format: CD, digital download, streaming	—	—	5	
"—" denotes a recording that did not chart or was not released in that territory.

== Singles ==
=== As lead artist ===
List of singles as lead artist, with selected chart positions and certifications, showing year released and album name
Title	Year	Peak chart positions								Certifications	Album
Title	Year	US	US Latin	US Latin Pop	ARG	COL	MEX	SPA	WW	Certifications	Album
"Inverso" (featuring Messiah)	2016	—	—	—	—	—	—	—	—		Non-album singles
"De Todos Nosotros" (with Young Martino and Álvaro Díaz featuring JP)	2016	—	—	—	—	—	—	—	—		Non-album singles
"Amor Juvenil"	2016	—	—	—	—	—	—	—	—		Non-album singles
"Volverá"	2017	—	—	—	—	—	—	—	—		Non-album singles
"19" (with Eladio Carrión and Jon Z)	2017	—	—	—	—	—	—	—	—		Non-album singles
"Culpa" (with Amarion)	2017	—	—	—	—	—	—	—	—		Non-album singles
"Sabe lo Que Viene" (with Ele A el Dominio)	2017	—	—	—	—	—	—	—	—		Non-album singles
"Que Tú Sabes de Esto" (with PJ Sin Suela)	2018	—	—	—	—	—	—	—	—		Non-album singles
"Producto" (with Nely el Arma Secreta and Lito Kirino)	2018	—	—	—	—	—	—	—	—		Non-album singles
"Noche Loca" (with Öken and Mora)	2018	—	—	—	—	—	—	—	—	RIAA: Gold (Latin)	Non-album singles
"Arreglamos" (with Joniel)	2018	—	—	—	—	—	—	—	—		Non-album singles
"Nostalgia (Primer Cuarto)" (with Marconi Impara and Gigolo & La Exce)	2018	—	—	—	—	—	—	—	—		Non-album singles
"Corito Sano" (with Lyanno and Amarion)	2018	—	—	—	—	—	—	—	—		Non-album singles
"No Fallamos" (with Álvaro Díaz)	2018	—	—	—	—	—	—	—	—		Non-album singles
"Fuego en el Fuego" (with Darkiel)	2018	—	—	—	—	—	—	—	—		Non-album singles
"Si Tú No Estás" (with Mora)	2018	—	—	—	—	—	—	—	—		Non-album singles
"Sigue Bailándome" (with Eladio Carrión, Darkiel, Brray and Yann'C)	2018	—	—	—	—	—	—	—	—	RIAA: Platinum (Latin)	Non-album singles
"Piérdete" (with Green Cookie and Rafa Pabön)	2018	—	—	—	—	—	—	—	—		Non-album singles
"Entre Sabanas" (with Anonimus and Jon Z featuring Rowsy)	2018	—	—	—	—	—	—	—	—		Non-album singles
"La Solicitud" (with Menor Menor and Mr. Perez)	2018	—	—	—	—	—	—	—	—		Non-album singles
"A Tu Nombre" (with Juanka)	2018	—	—	—	—	—	—	—	—		Non-album singles
"Dámela" (with Nio García)	2018	—	—	—	—	—	—	—	—		Non-album singles
"No Lo Parece" (with Casper Mágico and Gotay el Autentiko)	2018	—	—	—	—	—	—	—	—		Non-album singles
"Ojos Cielos" (with Jochy el Lobo)	2018	—	—	—	—	—	—	—	—		Non-album singles
"Noche Loca (Remix)" (with Öken and Mora featuring Bryant Myers, De La Ghetto, Juhn and Noriel)	2018	—	—	—	—	—	—	—	—		Non-album singles
"Pa' la Pared" (featuring Darell)	2018	—	—	—	—	—	—	—	—	RIAA: Gold (Latin)	Non-album singles
"Desaparecemos" (with Mariah Angeliq and Nely el Arma Secreta)	2019	—	—	—	—	—	—	—	—		Non-album singles
"Bajo Investigación" (with Tempo and Pancho featuring Juanka)	2019	—	—	—	—	—	—	—	—		Non-album singles
"Si Se Da" (with Farruko)	2019	— (Note: "Si Se Da" did not enter the Billboard Hot 100, but peaked at number seven on the Bubbling Under Hot 100 Singles chart.)	11	—	13	—	—	9	—	RIAA: 11× Platinum (Latin)	Easy Money Baby
"Celos" (with Mariah Angeliq)	2019	—	—	—	—	—	—	—	—		Non-album singles
"Se Nos Dió" (with Darell, Ñengo Flow and The Secret Panda featuring Jhayco)	2019	—	—	—	—	—	—	—	—		Non-album singles
"Ironía" (with Cauty)	2019	—	—	—	—	—	—	—	—		Non-album singles
"Sin Prendas Yo Brillo" (with Jon Z)	2019	—	—	—	—	—	—	—	—		Non-album singles
"Sola" (with Dayme & El High, Khea and Alex Rose)	2019	—	—	—	—	—	—	—	—		Non-album singles
"La Playa"	2019	—	—	—	46	—	—	3	—	RIAA: 6× Platinum (Latin)	Easy Money Baby
"Tú & Yo" (with Amarion and Lyanno)	2019	—	—	—	—	—	—	—	—		Non-album singles
"Ajena" (with Dylan Fuentes and Dayme & El High)	2019	—	—	—	—	—	—	—	—	RIAA: Gold (Latin)	Non-album singles
"Sigues Preguntando (Remix)" (with Alex Rose and Miky Woodz featuring Jory Boy and J Álvarez)	2019	—	—	—	—	—	—	—	—		Non-album singles
"No Podemos (Remix)" (with Ele A el Dominio and Eladio Carrión)	2019	—	—	—	—	—	—	—	—		Non-album singles
"Este Juego (Remix)" (with Papi Sousa and Álvaro Díaz)	2019	—	—	—	—	—	—	—	—		Non-album singles
"Traicionera"	2019	—	—	—	—	—	—	—	—		Non-album singles
"Raspo & Endeco" (with Ele A el Dominio and Jamby el Favo)	2019	—	—	—	—	—	—	—	—		Non-album singles
"Estamos Arriba" (with Bad Bunny)	2019	—	33	—	—	—	—	54	—		Non-album singles
"Inocente"	2019	—	—	—	—	—	—	27	—	RIAA: Gold (Latin)	Non-album singles
"Una Vida Para Recordar" (with Piso 21)	2019	—	46	25	85	10	10	69	—	RIAA: Platinum (Latin)	El Amor en los Tiempos del Perreo
"Dollar" (with Becky G)	2019	—	27	—	37	—	—	19	—	AMPROFON: Gold; PROMUSICAE: Gold	Mala Santa
"Sin Forzar" (with Pusho)	2019	—	—	—	—	—	—	—	—		Non-album singles
"Date Tu Guille" (with Milly and Farruko featuring Lary Over, Rauw Alejandro and Sharo Towers)	2019	—	—	—	—	—	—	—	—	RIAA: Platinum (Latin)	Non-album singles
"No Tenemos Nada" (with Amenazzy)	2019	—	—	—	—	—	—	—	—		Non-album singles
"Cuerpo En Venta" (with Noriel and Rauw Alejandro featuring Almighty)	2019	—	—	—	—	—	—	—	—		Non-album singles
"Si Se Da (Remix)" (with Farruko and Arcángel featuring Sech and Zion)	2019	—	—	—	—	—	—	—	—	RIAA: 13× Platinum (Latin)	Non-album singles
"Piensan"	2019	—	—	—	—	—	—	25	—	RIAA: Gold (Latin)	Easy Money Baby
"Girl"	2020	—	23	—	—	—	—	28	—	RIAA: 5× Platinum (Latin)	Easy Money Baby
"Diosa" (Solo or Remix with Anuel AA and Natti Natasha)	2020	—	38	—	14	—	32	2	135	RIAA: 7× Platinum (Latin); RIAA: Gold (Latin) (Remix); PROMUSICAE: 3× Platinum; PROMUSICAE: Gold (Remix)	Easy Money Baby
"Me Prefiere a Mí" (with Cazzu)	2020	—	—	—	—	—	—	—	—		Bonus Trap
"Ponte Pa' Mí" (with Rauw Alejandro and Sky Rompiendo)	2020	—	—	—	—	—	—	32	—		Non-album singles
"Carita de Inocente (Remix)" (with Prince Royce)	2020	—	—	—	—	—	—	4	—		Non-album singles
"La Jeepeta (Remix)" (with Nio García, Anuel AA, Juanka and Brray)	2020	93	3	—	1	—	—	1	29	RIAA: 16× Platinum (Latin); PROMUSICAE: 4× Platinum	Now or Never
"La Luz" (with Thalía)	2020	—	—	17	—	—	16	—	—		Desamorfosis
"Luna" (with Gigolo & La Exce)	2020	—	—	—	—	—	—	—	—		TBA
"Enemigos Ocultos" (with Ozuna and Wisin featuring Arcángel, Juanka and Cosculluela)	2020	—	—	—	—	—	—	—	—		ENOC
"Jalapeño (Remix)" (with Amenazzy and Wiz Khalifa)	2020	—	—	—	—	—	—	—	—		TBA
"Mi Niña" (with Los Legendarios and Wisin and remix with Anitta and Maluma)	2020	— (Note: "Mi Niña" did not enter the Billboard Hot 100, but peaked at number 18 on the Bubbling Under Hot 100 Singles chart.)	10	—	28	6	1	5	82	RIAA: Platinum (Latin); RIAA: Platinum (Latin) (Remix); PROMUSICAE: 2× Platinum	TBA
"Caramelo" (Remix)" (with Ozuna and Karol G)	2020	76	3	—	3	—	—	—	16	PROMUSICAE: 2× Platinum	ENOC
"La Nota" (with Manuel Turizo and Rauw Alejandro)	2020	—	—	—	25	—	—	3	59		Dopamina
"Bandido" (with Juhn)	2020	82	4	—	1	4	30	1	11	RIAA: 3× Platinum (Latin); PROMUSICAE: 4× Platinum	Para Mi Ex
"Only Fans (Remix)" (with Young Martino and Lunay, featuring Jhayco, Arcángel, Darell, Ñengo Flow, Brray & Joyce Santana)	2020	—	—	—	—	—	—	94	—	RIAA: 2× Platinum (Latin)	Non-album singles
"Los Bo" (with Jhayco)	2021	—	40	—	—	—	—	46	—	RIAA: Gold (Latin)	Non-album singles
"Cuando Bebe" (with Jay Menez and De La Ghetto)	2021	—	—	—	—	—	—	94	—		Non-album singles
"Ella No Es Tuya (Remix)" (with Rochy RD and Nicki Nicole)	2021	—	30	—	2	—	—	1	39	RIAA: Platinum (Latin); PROMUSICAE: 3× Platinum	Non-album singles
"Quédate Sola" (with Jon Z and Eladio Carrión)	2021	—	—	—	—	—	—	—	—		Non-album singles
"Oh Mama" (with Farruko)	2021	—	45	—	—	—	48	72	—		Non-album singles
"Las Leyendas Nunca Mueren" (with Ovi, Ñengo Flow and Alemán)	2021	—	—	—	—	—	—	—	—		Non-album singles
"Cuenta"	2021	—	45	—	—	—	—	78	—		Lyke Myke
"Burberry" (with Ñengo Flow)	2021	—	35	—	—	—	—	62	—	RIAA: Platinum (Latin)	Lyke Myke
"Pareja del Año" (with Sebastián Yatra)	2021	— (Note: "Pareja del Año" did not enter the Billboard Hot 100, but peaked at number 16 on the Bubbling Under Hot 100 Singles chart.)	10	—	2	2	24	1	16	RIAA: 8× Platinum (Latin); AMPROFON: Platinum+Gold; PROMUSICAE: 4× Platinum	Non-album single
"El Tren" (with Micro TDH)	2021	—	—	—	—	—	—	—	—	RIAA: Gold (Latin)	Nueve
"Bésame" (with Luis Fonsi)	2021	—	—	—	78	—	—	11	—	RIAA: Platinum (Latin); PROMUSICAE: Gold	Non-album singles
"Almas Gemelas"	2021	—	—	—	—	—	—	14	—	RIAA: 5× Platinum (Latin)	Non-album singles
"Experimento"	2021	—	—	—	—	—	—	3	—	RIAA: 3× Platinum (Latin)	Non-album singles
"Oh Na Na" (with Camila Cabello and Tainy)	2021	—	20	—	—	—	—	51	—		Non-album singles
"Súbelo" (with Anuel AA and Jhayco)	2021	— (Note: "Súbelo" did not enter the Billboard Hot 100, but peaked at number 15 on the Bubbling Under Hot 100 Singles chart.)	12	—	—	—	—	15	—	PROMUSICAE: Gold	Las Leyendas Nunca Mueren
"Jóvenes Millonarios" (with Eladio Carrión)	2021	—	—	—	—	—	—	48	—		Sauce Boyz 2
"Tendencia Global" (with Blessd and Ovy on the Drums)	2022	—	—	—	—	—	—	56	—	RIAA: Platinum (Latin)	Non-album singles
"Traductor" (with Tiago PZK)	2022	—	—	—	17	—	—	31	—	RIAA: Gold (Latin)	Non-album singles
"Ande Con Quien Ande" (with Jhayco)	2022	—	—	—	—	—	—	56	—	RIAA: Platinum (Latin)	Non-album singles
"Luces de Neón"	2022	—	—	—	—	—	—	22	—	RIAA: Gold (Latin)	Non-album singles
"Ulalá" (with Daddy Yankee)	2022	—	—	—	—	—	—	19	—	RIAA: 2× Platinum (Latin)	Non-album singles
"Playa del Inglés" (with Quevedo)	2022	—	—	—	21	—	—	1	—		Non-album singles
"Whiskey y Coco" (with Justin Quiles)	2023	—	—	—	—	—	—	31	—		Non-album singles
"Solo Sexo"	2023	—	—	—	—	—	—	84	—		Non-album singles
"Aquardiente"	2023	—	—	—	—	—	—	26	—		La Vida Es Una
"Lala"	2023	43	4	—	1	—	—	1	3	RIAA: 23× Platinum (Latin); PROMUSICAE: 8× Platinum	La Vida Es Una
"Mi Lova" (with Bad Gyal)	2023	—	—	—	—	—	—	21	—	PROMUSICAE: Platinum	Non-album singles
"Bajo El Sol"	2023	—	—	—	—	—	—	—	—		Non-album singles
"La Falda"	2023	— (Note: "La Falda" did not enter the Billboard Hot 100, but peaked at number four on the Bubbling Under Hot 100 Singles chart.)	12	—	14	—	—	2	54	RIAA: 11× Platinum (Latin); PROMUSICAE: 6× Platinum	LVEU: Vive la Tuya... No la Mía
"Adivino" (with Bad Bunny)	2024	63	2	—	48	4	14	3	28	RIAA: 6× Platinum (Latin); PROMUSICAE: 2× Platinum	La Pantera Negra
"Sport+ RMX" (with Clarent)	2024	—	—	—	—	—	—	54	—		Non-album single
"Otra Noche" (featuring Darell)	2024	—	—	—	—	—	—	10	—		La Pantera Negra
"Degenere" (featuring Benny Blanco)	2024	—	35	—	9	—	—	1	73	PROMUSICAE: Platinum	La Pantera Negra
"Nueva Era" (with Duki)	2024	—	—	—	2	—	—	5	130		Ameri
"Sentimiento Natural" (with Aitana)	2025	—	—	—	—	—	—	7	—		Non-album single
"Baja California"	2025	—	—	—	—	—	—	—	—		F1 the Album
"Soleao" (with Quevedo)	2025	—	—	—	—	—	—	3	—		Island Boyz
"Expectativas"	2025	—	—	—	—	—	—	33	—		Island Boyz
"Tengo Celos"	2025	—	—	—	—	—	—	27	—		Island Boyz
"Te Imagino"	2026	—	—	—	—	—	—	22	—		
"—" denotes a recording that did not chart or was not released in that territory.

=== As featured artist ===
List of singles as a featured artist, with selected chart positions and showing year released
Title	Year	Peak chart positions				Certifications	Album
Title	Year	US	US Latin	SPA	WW	Certifications	Album
"La Cama" (Lunay featuring Myke Towers)	2019	—	—	19	—		Épico
"Me Gusta" (Anitta featuring Cardi B and Myke Towers)	2020	91	5	82	37		Versions of Me
"La Curiosidad" (Jay Wheeler and DJ Nelson featuring Myke Towers)	2020	— (Note: "La Curiosidad" did not enter the Billboard Hot 100, but peaked at number one on the Bubbling Under Hot 100 Singles chart.)	5	2	40		Platónicos
"Dámelo To'" (Selena Gomez featuring Myke Towers)	2021	—	20	90	—		Revelación
"T'as Peur'" (Aya Nakamura featuring Myke Towers)	2023	—	—	29	—		DNK
"El Cielo'" (Sky Rompiendo featuring Feid and Myke Towers)	2023	—	—	3	47		Non-album singles
"Desataaa'" (Ovy on the Drums featuring Myke Towers and Saiko)	2024	—	—	6	—		Non-album singles
"Trending Remix'" (Deiv featuring Myke Towers)	2024	—	—	14	—		Non-album singles
"La Ranger'" (Dímelo Flow, Sech, Dalex, Justin Quiles and Lenny Tavárez featuring Myke Towers)	2024	—	43	3	176	PROMUSICAE: Gold	The Academy: Segunda Misión
"—" denotes a title that was not released or did not chart in that territory.

== Other charted and certified songs ==
List of other charted and certified songs
Title	Year	Peak chart positions	Certifications	Album
Title	Year	SPA	Certifications	Album
"Zili" (with Chucky73 and Fetti031)	2020	—	RIAA: Gold (Latin)	De Chamaquito Siempre Cabezu
"La Capi"	2023	17		LVEU: Vive la Tuya... No la Mía
"Godiva'" (Ovy on the Drums featuring Myke Towers, Blessd and Ryan Castro)	2024	70		Cassette 01
"Diablita'" with Yovngchimi)	2024	44		La Pantera Negra
"Se Te Nota'" with Peso Pluma)	2024	49		La Pantera Negra
"Competencia'"	2024	51		La Pantera Negra
"También"	2024	8		La Pantera Negra
"Aunque Llegue Otro" with Jay Wheeler)	2024	63		La Pantera Negra
"La Primera Vez" with NTG)	2024	76		La Pantera Negra
"Otra Oportunidad"	2024	80		La Pantera Negra
"Dinero Y Fama" with Omar Montes)	2024	88		La Pantera Negra
"Mejor Así"	2024	92		La Pantera Negra
"Hasta la Vista"	2024	94		La Pantera Negra
"Frío"	2024	96		La Pantera Negra
"Móntate Baby" with Morad)	2025	80	PROMUSICAE: Gold	
"Ily" with Kapo)	2025	14		
"Vetements" with Eladio Carrión)	2025	12		
"Van Cleef" with Piro)	2025	36		

== Other guest appearances ==
List of other album appearances
Title	Year	Other artist(s)	Album
"Puesto Pa' Guerrial"	2020	Bad Bunny	YHLQMDLG
"Dámelo To'"	2021	Selena Gomez	Revelación
"Billetes De 100"	2021	J Balvin	Jose
"Te Fuiste"	2021	Enrique Iglesias	Final
"Bebiendo Sola"	2022	Camilo	De Adentro Pa Afuera

== Music videos ==
List of music videos, showing year released and directors
Title	Year	Other artist(s)	Director(s) franmontilla
"Una Vida Para Recordar"	2019	Piso 21	Paloma Valencia
"Dollar"	2019	Becky G	Eif Rivera
"Me Gusta"	2020	Anitta; Cardi B	Daniel Russel
