= List of Latin trap musicians =

The following is an alphabetical list of artists who have been categorized as Latin trap:

- A. Chal
- Almighty
- Andy Rivera
- Anuel AA
- Arcángel
- Bad Bunny
- Blessd
- Bryant Myers
- Brytiago
- Cazzu
- Clarent
- Cosculluela
- Darell
- De La Ghetto
- De La Rose
- Dei V
- Duki
- Ele A el Dominio
- Faraón Love Shady
- Farruko
- Fuego
- Hades66
- J Álvarez
- Jhayco
- Jon Z
- Kevin Fret
- Khea
- Kris R
- Lit Killah
- Luar la L
- Lunay
- Maikel Delacalle
- Maluma
- Messiah
- Miky Woodz
- Milo J
- Myke Towers
- Nicky Jam
- Noriel
- Omar Courtz
- Ozuna
- Renata Flores
- ROA
- Ryan Castro
- Pacho El Antifeka
- Paulo Londra
- Tali Goya
- Trueno
- Yan Block
- Young Miko
- YOVNGCHIMI
