= Nicky Jam: El Ganador =

American biographical television series

- Genre: Biographical
- Directed by: Jessy Terrero
- Starring: Nicky Jam
- Country of origin: United States
- Original language: Spanish
- No. of seasons: 1
- No. of episodes: 13

Production
- Camera setup: Multi-camera
- Production company: Endemol Shine Boomdog

Original release
- Network: Telemundo
- Release: 30 November 2018

Nicky Jam: El Ganador is an American biographical television series based on the life of reggaeton singer Nicky Jam. The series is directed by Jessy Terrero, and produced by Endemol Shine Boomdog for Telemundo, and Netflix. It stars Nicky Jam as the titular character. Filming began on 15 January 2018, and the series consists of 13 episodes.

The series premiered in the United States on Telemundo on 16 September 2019, while in Spain and Latin America it premiered on Netflix on 30 November 2018.

== Plot ==
The series focuses on Nicky Jam, an American reggaeton artist born in Lawrence, Massachusetts to a Dominican mother and Puerto Rican father. Nicky Jam had a very difficult childhood, because he grew up in an environment stained by drugs and crime, since he lived in a dangerous city and his parents used illicit substances.

When he was about 8 years old, he went to live on the Island of Puerto Rico along with his father José Rivera and his sister Stephanie after the divorce of their parents. It would be in San Juan, Puerto Rico where he would spend most of his life. At an early age he became interested in urban music.

He began to sing genres such as reggaeton and rap when he was a teenager and thus he would attract the attention of several important producers and singers of Puerto Rico for the time. At approximately 19 years old, he formed a musical duo along with the renowned artist Daddy Yankee called Los Cangris. This duo was one of the best in the urban genre at that time until due to conflicts between artists, it came to an end. However, Nicky had been abusing drugs since he was young and that hurt him in his personal life and in his artistic career that would go down.

However, he moves to Medellin, Colombia where he begins his rehabilitation process to get away from drugs. Already rehabilitated, Nicky decides to re-try the world of music and his career grows again until he reaches the top.

== Cast ==
- Nicky Jam as Himself
  - Darkiel as Young Nicky
  - Avery Rodríguez as Child Nicky
- Essined Aponte as Aleysha
- José Caro as José Rivera
  - Alexon Duprey as Young José Rivera
- Mariana Monclova as Young Isabel Caminero
- José Arroyo as Daddy Yankee
- Diego Cadavid as Juan Diego
- Modesto Lacen as Pedro
- Leli Hernández as Stephanie Rivera
- Ana Lucía Domínguez as Rosa
- Osvaldo Friger as Alberto Stylee
- J Balvin as Himself
- Sharlene Taulé as Cassandra
- Valentino as Himself
- Wes Williams as Miguel
- Ñengo Flow as Ciro
- De La Ghetto as The Barber
- Noel Gugliemi as Stephen
- Elyfer Torres as Julia
- Néstor Rodulfo as Cuti
- Gilluis Pérez as Chino
- Miky Woodz as Alejo
- Jon Z as Piri
- Juhn "El All-Star" as Rigo
- Tali Goya as Oscar
- Hector "Misterr P" Perez Figueroa as Pina

== Episodes ==
No.	Title	English title	Directed by	Written by	Original release date	U.S. air date
1	"Los Cangris"	"The Cangris"	Jessy Terrero	Ari Maniel Cruz	30 November 2018	16 September 2019
Nicky Jam talks about the death of Tito, his music producer in the beginning. Tito was a fundamental part of Los Cangris, but due to his problems with drugs, he asked Cuti's brother for drugs without paying him before, after this Cuti's brother goes to Tito to ask him to pay what he owns him, but he tells him he will pay later. After a strong discussion between them, Tito murders Cuti's brother and then puts him in the trunk of his car and sets the car on fire. Subsequently, Cuti finds out who murdered his brother, and kills Tito, but that did not help him feel good about himself, so he decides to seek revenge on Los Cangris, and threatens them to death.
2	"Escape a Nueva Yol"	"Escape To New York"	Jessy Terrero	Kisha Tikina Burgos	30 November 2018	17 September 2019
3	"Con el micrófono y la forty"	"With The Mic, And The 40 Caliber"	Jessy Terrero	Ray Figueroa	30 November 2018	18 September 2019
4	"En la cama"	"In The Bed"	Jessy Terrero	Ari Maniel Cruz	30 November 2018	19 September 2019
5	"El infiltrado"	"The Infiltrated"	Jessy Terrero	Kisha Tikina Burgos	30 November 2018	20 September 2019
6	"Vida escante"	"Escante Life"	Jessy Terrero	Ray Figueroa	30 November 2018	23 September 2019
7	"El origen"	"The Origin"	Jessy Terrero	Kisha Tikina Burgos	30 November 2018	24 September 2019
8	"El futuro es paisa"	"The Future Is Paisa"	Jessy Terrero	Ray Figueroa	30 November 2018	25 September 2019
9	"Medellín"	"Medellín"	Jessy Terrero	Ari Maniel Cruz	30 November 2018	26 September 2019
10	"Cold Turkey"	"Cold Turkey"	Jessy Terrero	Ray Figueroa	30 November 2018	27 September 2019
11	"Ave Fénix"	"The Fenix"	Jessy Terrero	Kisha Tikina Burgos	30 November 2018	30 September 2019
12	"Un pastel"	"Isabel"	Jessy Terrero	Ray Figueroa	30 November 2018	1 October 2019
13	"Dímelo Papi llegamos al Choli"	"Tell Me Daddy, We Arrived To The Choli"	Jessy Terrero	Ari Maniel Cruz	30 November 2018	2 October 2019
