= Gan-Ga =

2016 song by Bryant Myers

Single by Bryant Myers

from the album Bendecido
- Language: Spanish
- Released: 26 July 2019
- Genre: Latin trap
- Length: 3:13
- Label: La Commission LLC Entertainment One
- Songwriters: Bryan Rohena; Emmanuel Santiago; Karim Kharbouch; Tione Merritt
- Producers: Cromo X; Lanalizer

Bryant Myers singles chronology
"Bandolera" (2019)	"Gan-Ga" (2019)	"LowKey" (2019)

Music video
- "Gan-Ga" on YouTube

"Gan-Ga" is a song by Puerto Rican rapper Bryant Myers released on July 26, 2019. On November 15, 2019, a remix featuring Puerto Rican rapper Anuel AA was released on and peaked 11 on the Hot Latin Songs chart.

== Remix ==
The official remix of the song is a collaboration with fellow Puerto Rican rapper Anuel AA. It is released on 15 November 2019 on Bryant Myers' Youtube channel.

A few days later other musicians like Farruko, Myke Towers, Jhayco and Miky Woodz recorded their own parts of the song.

On 10 April 2020, Bryant Myers dropped Gan-Ga (Uptown Remix) featuring American rappers French Montana and Lil Tjay.

== Controversy ==
On October 17, 2019, Anuel AA generated controversy by posting "Nunca flow Maluma, siempre Real G" on his social media, directed at Colombian singer Maluma.

== Charts ==
Chart (2019)	Peak position
Argentina (Argentina Hot 100)	40
Spain (PROMUSICAE)	14
US Hot Latin Songs (Billboard)	11

== Certifications ==
Region	Certification	Certified units/sales
United States (RIAA)	2× Platinum (Latin)	120,000^{‡}
^{‡} Sales+streaming figures based on certification alone.
