= Cuatro Babys =

2016 song by Maluma featuring Noriel, Bryant Myers and Juhn

Single by Maluma featuring Noriel, Bryant Myers and Juhn

from the album Trap Capos: Season 1
- Language: Spanish
- English title: "Four Babies"
- Released: October 7, 2016
- Genre: Latin trap; Latin R&B
- Length: 4:39
- Label: Sony Latin
- Songwriters: Juan Luis Londoño; Bryan Rohena; Jorge J. Hernández; Jorge Fonseca; John Pérez; Noel Santos; Sharon Ramírez
- Producers: Santana the Golden Boy; dannyebtracks

Maluma singles chronology
"Vente Pa' Ca" (2016)	"Cuatro Babys" (2016)	"Sim ou Não / Sí o No" (2016)

Music video
- "Cuatro Babys" on YouTube

"Cuatro Babys" is a song by Colombian singer Maluma featuring Puerto Rican rappers Noriel, Bryant Myers, and Juhn. The song is taken from Noriel's album Trap Capos: Season 1 (2016). It was released as the album's first single on 7 October 2016 through Sony Music Latin. Maluma co-wrote the track with Bryant Myers, Noriel, Jorge J. Hernández, Jorge Fonseca, John Pérez and Sharon Ramírez. It was produced by Santana the Golden Boy. The song peaked at number 21 in Colombia and number 15 on the Billboard Hot Latin Songs chart.

== Controversy ==
This song has received much controversy over its lyrics as they arguably appear to suggest direct violence towards women. A petition was posted on Change.org demanding for the removal of the song from digital platforms. Despite this controversy, the popularity of "Cuatro Babys" has only risen with the song having gone quadruple Platinum. Because of this, Latin trap has had a large, but primarily underground, following.

== Music video ==
The music video for "Cuatro Babys" premiered on 14 October 2016 on Maluma's Vevo account on YouTube. The music video was directed by Jose Javy Ferrer and features Maluma, Noriel, Bryant Myers, and Juhn across multiple scenes surrounded by women who obey each of their commands. The music video has over 1 billion views on YouTube.

== Charts ==
=== Weekly charts ===
Chart (2016)	Peak position
Colombia (National-Report)	21
Spain (Promusicae)	55
US Hot Latin Songs (Billboard)	15
US Latin Rhythm Airplay (Billboard)	23

=== Year-end charts ===
Chart (2017)	Position
US Hot Latin Songs (Billboard)	38

== Certifications ==
Region	Certification	Certified units/sales
Brazil (Pro-Música Brasil)	Gold	30,000^{‡}
Mexico (AMPROFON)	Diamond	300,000^{‡}
Spain (Promusicae)	2× Platinum	120,000^{‡}
United States (RIAA)	12× Platinum (Latin)	720,000^{‡}
^{‡} Sales+streaming figures based on certification alone.
