= Miky Woodz =

Puerto Rican rapper

- Born: Miguel Ángel Rodriguez Rivera; September 23, 1991 (age 34); Carolina, Puerto Rico
- Genres: Latin trap; reggaeton
- Occupation: Rapper
- Years active: 2016–present
- Label: Gol2 Latin Music

Miguel Ángel Rodríguez Rivera (born September 23, 1991), known professionally as Miky Woodz, is a Puerto Rican rapper. To date, he has released three studio albums, Before Famous in 2017, El OG in 2018, and most recently, in 2020, Los 90 Piketes, which are all commercial successes.

== Personal life ==
Woodz was born in Carolina, Puerto Rico. According to Woodz, he sacrificed a job in a warehouse that paid him minimal wage to continue with his passion for music. Woodz also has a young son named "Meek".

== Career ==
His debut album was Before Famous released in 2017, which reached number four in Billboard and number 20 in Latin Album Sales. He then released his second studio album through Gol2 Records, SoldOut Records, and GLAD Empire Records in 2018, entitled El OG. Highlighted by the song "Estamos Clear" with Bad Bunny, it debuted at number six on Billboard's Top Latin Albums chart and had collaborations with Noriel, Farruko, De La Ghetto, Pusho, Juhn, Ñejo, Darkiel, and Bad Bunny. The song "Estamos Clear" was censored in the Dominican Republic.

Miky Woodz gained commercial ground in the mid-2010s with featured roles on tracks by artists such as Farruko, Benny Benni, and Juhn. He signed to the Florida-based label Gol2 Latin Music, where he released songs such as "Alcoba [Remix]", "En Lo Oscuro Sin Perse", and "Tarde o Temprano", all three of which amassed streams and millions of views on YouTube.

== Discography ==
=== Studio albums ===
List of albums, with details, selected chart positions and certifications
Title	Album details	Peak chart positions			Certifications
Title	Album details	US Ind	US Lat	SPA	Certifications
Before Famous	Released: July 21, 2017; Label: Gold2 Latin Music; Format: Digital download, streaming	—	—	—	
El OG	Released: May 25, 2018; Label: Gold2 Latin Music; Format: Digital download, streaming	30	6	—	RIAA: Gold (Latin)
Los 90 Piketes	Released: April 17, 2020; Label: Gold2 Latin Music; Format: Digital download, streaming	48	10	12	
Living Life	Released: November 12, 2021; Label: Rimas Entertainment; Format: Digital download, streaming	—	45	—	
"—" denotes a recording that did not chart or was not released in that territory.

=== Extended plays ===
List of Extended plays, with details, selected chart positions and certifications
Title	Album details	Peak chart positions	
Title	Album details	US Lat	SPA
Cambio de Clima (with Bryant Myers)	Released: February 8, 2019; Label: La Commission; Format: Digital download, streaming	20	34
El OG Week	Released: February 8, 2019; Label: La Commission; Format: Digital download, streaming	17	41
"—" denotes a recording that did not chart or was not released in that territory.

=== Singles ===
==== As lead artist ====
List of singles, with year released, selected chart positions and certifications
Title	Year	Peak chart positions				Certifications	Album
Title	Year	US Lat	US Lat Digi	MEX	SPA	Certifications	Album
"Estamos Clear" (featuring Bad Bunny)	2018	—	22	—	—	RIAA: 3× Platinum (Latin)	El OG
"Na' Personal" (featuring Alex Rose)	2018	—	—	—	—	RIAA: Gold (Latin)	Non-album singles
"A Todas Horas" (with Marvel Boy)	2018	—	—	—	—	RIAA: Gold (Latin)	Non-album singles
"Impaciente" (with Chencho Corleone)	2019	—	25	—	—		Non-album singles
"Se Nota" (with Juhn and Bryant Myers featuring Lary Over)	2019	—	—	—	—	RIAA: Gold (Latin)	Non-album singles
"Si Te Veo" (with Arcángel and Jay Wheeler)	2021	44	—	—	43		Los Favoritos 2.5
"Nadie Se Tiene Que Enterar" (with Nio García and Jay Wheeler)	2022	—	—	2	—		Non-album single
"—" denotes a recording that did not chart or was not released in that territory.

==== As featured artist ====
List of singles, with year released, selected chart positions and certifications
Title	Year	Peak chart positions			Certifications	Album
Title	Year	US Lat	US Lat Digi	SPA	Certifications	Album
"Ahora Me Llama" (Remix) (Juhn featuring Bryant Myers, Anonimus, Noriel, Brytiago and Miky Woodz)	2016	—	—	—	RIAA: Gold (Latin)	Non-album single
"Darte" (Remix) (Alex Rose and Casper Mágico featuring Ñengo Flow, Bryant Myers, Noriel, Juhn, Miky Woodz, Jhay Cortez and Myke Towers)	2018	—	—	—	RIAA: 4× Platinum (Latin)	Sexflix 1.5
"Viajo Sin Ver" (Remix) (Jon Z featuring Ele A El Dominio, Pusho, El Alfa, Noriel, De La Ghetto, Juanka, Miky Woodz, Jeycyn, Lyan and Almighty)	2018	—	—	—	RIAA: Gold (Latin)	Non-album singles
"Quiere Fumar" (Remix) (Nio García, Casper Mágico and Darell featuring Miky Woodz, De La Ghetto and Almighty)	2018	—	—	—	RIAA: Gold (Latin)	Non-album singles
"Mi Intención" (Wisin & Yandel featuring Miky Woodz)	2018	—	—	—	RIAA: Gold (Latin)	Los Campeones del Pueblo
"No" (Milly, Farruko and Sech featuring Miky Woodz and Gigolo Y La Exce)	2019	48	—	—		Non-album single
"Qué Mal Te Fue" (Remix) (Natti Natasha featuring Justin Quiles and Miky Woodz)	2020	—	—	84		Nattividad
"No Me Acostumbro" (Wisin, Ozuna and Reik featuring Miky Woodz and Los Legendarios)	2020	—	7	—	RIAA: Platinum (Latin)	Los Legendarios 001
"—" denotes a recording that did not chart or was not released in that territory.

=== As charted and certified songs ===
List of songs, with year released, selected chart positions and certifications
Title	Year	Peak chart positions	Certifications	Album
Title	Year	SPA	Certifications	Album
"Antes de Morirme"	2017	—	RIAA: Platinum (Latin)	Before Famous
"Ganas Sobran" with Bryant Myers featuring Justin Quiles)	2019	20	Promusicae: Platinum	Cambio de Clima
"Forever Happy" featuring Juhn)	2019	99		El OG Week
"—" denotes a recording that did not chart or was not released in that territory.
