= Gilluis Pérez =

Puerto Rican actor

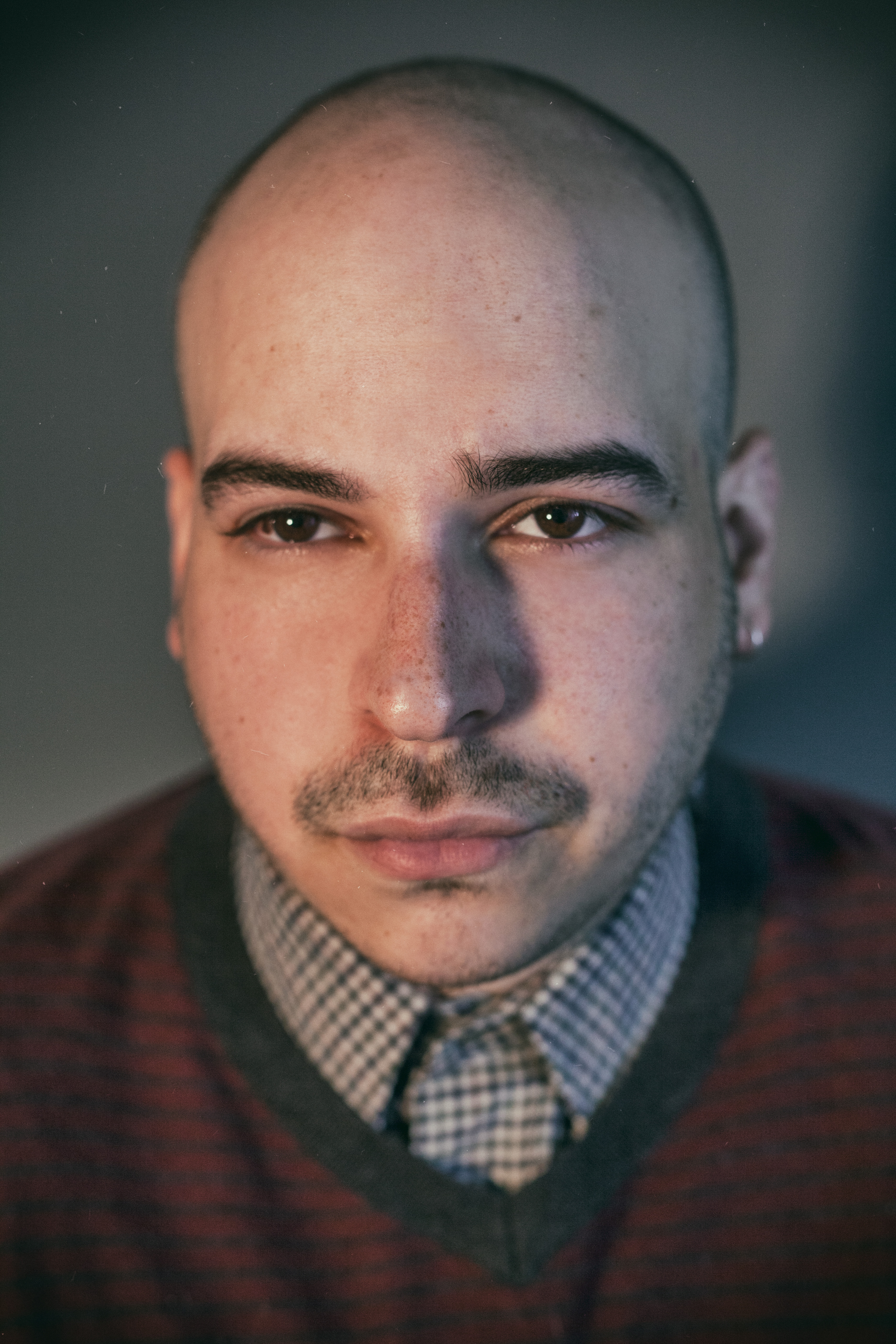
Portrait of Gilluis Pérez

Gilluis Fernando Pérez (born October 4, 1989, Ponce) is an actor, producer, writer and director from Puerto Rico.

== Career ==
As a child Perez participated in shows, dances and musicals throughout his school years. He began his studies in architecture, at the Polytechnic University of Puerto Rico, but became interested in acting and he participated in ballet, modern ballet and modern dance with the company Ballets de San Juan, and in between 2011 and 2014 studied Drama and Theater at the Universidad del Sagrado Corazón in San Juan. Began his career in 2009 on TV shows like Zona Y, then Extremos for the Telemundo Puerto Rico channel, and with small roles as Infliltrados (2010) for HBO Latino. In 2011 he made his debut in theater through the play La Pasión Según Antígona Pérez by Luis Rafael Sánchez. Between 2012 and 2013 he worked in the short films Mente Jodida, En Silencio, Sólo Aquí and Revolt, as well as the Showtime TV series, The Big C.

In 2014 he made his directorial debut with the short film Sin Filo, in which he was also the protagonist and earned him his first film recognition thanks to the Audience Award at the Puerto Rico Queer Filmfest 2013. Perez also screened at the Amelia Island film festival 2014 and was part of the official selection of the Cinefiesta film festival 2014. In 2015 he participated in the comedy El Florista, for which he won the Audience Award at the Puerto Rico Queer film Festival 2014 for second consecutive year and the Award for Best comedy at the Rincón International film festival 2015. That same year he was chosen to join The Actors Studio Drama School in New York City. In January 2016 he worked in the film The Least Worst Man, with which he made his debut at the Lincoln Center in May 2016, as part of the Film Society of Lincoln Center in New York.

== Filmography ==
- Mente Jodida (2012).
- En Silencio (2012).
- Sólo Aquí (2013).
- Revolt (2013).
- Sin Filo (2014).
- El Florista (2015).
- Juan y Julia (2018).
- Kiss (2018).
- The Least Worst Man (2018).

=== TV ===
- Zona Y (2009).
- Infliltrados (2010).
- Extremos (2011).
- The Big C (2013).
- The Classroom (2017).
- The Oath (2018).
- Nicky Jam: El Ganador (2019).
- The Baker & The Beauty (2020).

=== Director ===
- Sin Filo (2014).

=== Producer ===
- Sin Filo (2014).
