= El Bananero =

Uruguayan-American Internet phenomenon and producer (born 1976)

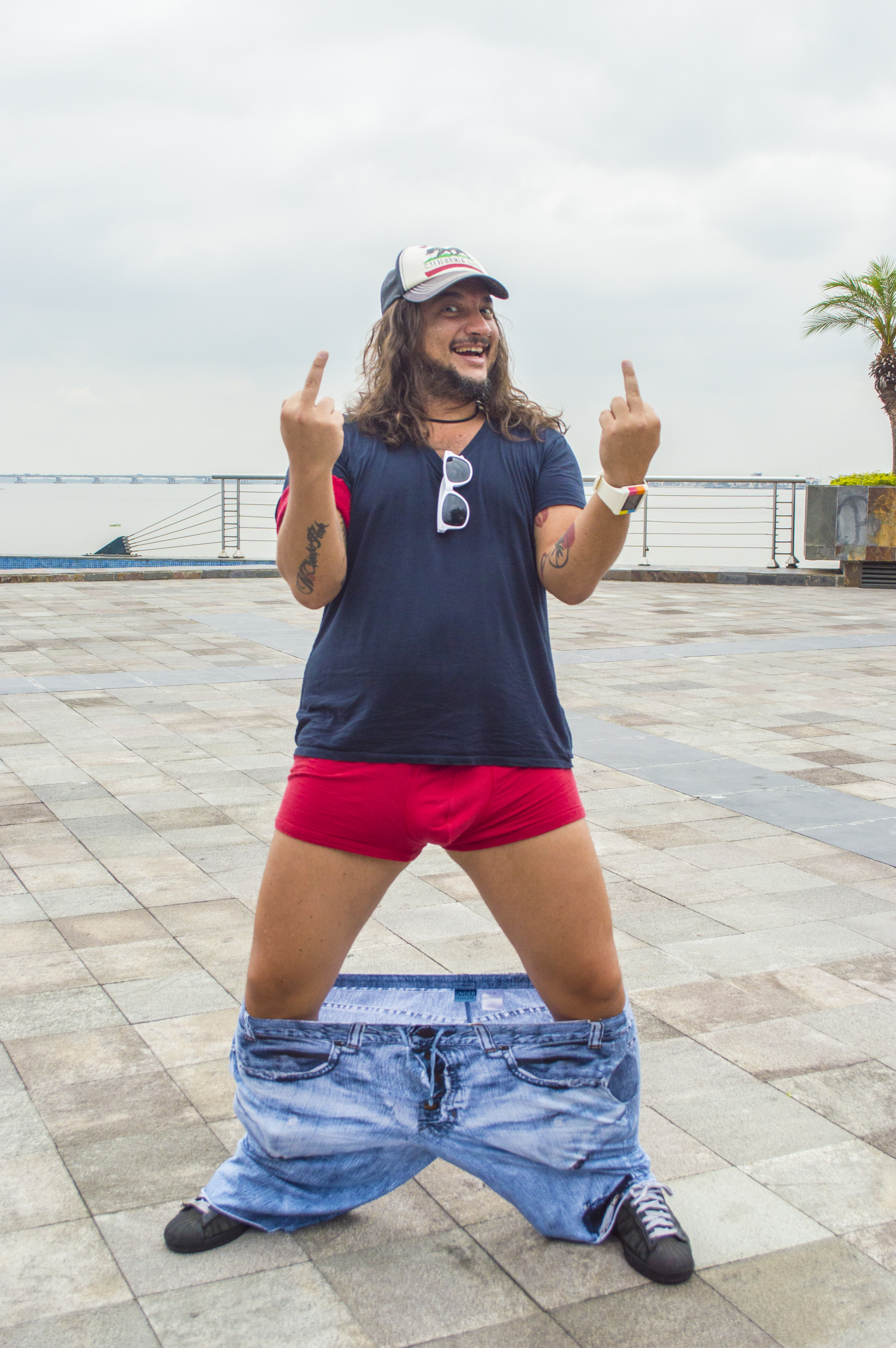
- El Bananero in 2016
- Born: Adrián Maximiliano Nario Pérez; 12 September 1976 (age 49); Elizabeth, New Jersey, U.S.

YouTube information
- Channel: EL BANANERO OFICIAL
- Years active: 2011–present
- Genre: Humor
- Subscribers: 3.49 million
- Views: 390.1 million
- Last updated: September 11, 2025
- Website: elbananero.tv

Adrián Maximiliano Nario Pérez (born September 12, 1976), better known for his stage name El Bananero ("The Banana Man" or "The Banana Tree Man" in English), is an Uruguayan-American humorist, producer and Internet celebrity who is known for creating and uploading videos that contain irreverent humor and obscene language.

== Biography ==
El Bananero was born in Elizabeth, New Jersey. When he was eight years old, he moved to Montevideo, Uruguay where he acquired citizenship from his parents. He lived there until he moved to Miami, Florida in 2005.

While his parents were at work, he was left alone at home, where he recorded pornography from adult cable television channels to show to his friends.

== Internet phenomenon ==
=== Beginning ===
In 2005, El Bananero decided to make videos to have fun with his friends. His content generally includes humour that is satirical, irreverent, foul, sexist, scatological, and obscene. He mocks taboo subjects such as sex and performs parodies of famous movies with his montage. His acts captured significant online attention in Latin America. He created his website, elbananero.com, to upload his videos and share them. A year later, when YouTube was established, he started a channel there, which quickly became popular among adolescents.

=== Videos ===
Among his popular content are the "Trailerazos," which are videos in trailer format that parody famous Hollywood movies, including El Hombre que Araña ("The Man Who Scratches," spoofing Spider-Man), Harry el Sucio Potter ("Dirty Harry Potter," satirizing Harry Potter) and El Impotente Hulk ("The Impotent Hulk," parodying The Incredible Hulk), among many others.

The Iván el Trolazo Trailerazo (parodying the animated series He-Man) led to a lawsuit by Mattel, which shut down El Bananero's YouTube channel. He opened another channel which reached a million subscribers in 2016. His videos often show genitals, which has led to their frequent removal by YouTube. His videos have been re-uploaded with censors.

In January 2015, El Bananero surprised his followers by posting a photograph with one of the most popular pornstars of the time, Mia Khalifa. He then uploaded a video for his channel called Mia Khalifa vs. La Muñeca Psicótica System (Mia Khalifa vs. the Psychotic Doll System).

=== Latin American shows ===
In addition to earning a living as an audiovisual producer and YouTuber, he also performed stand-up comedy tours in Latin America. Since 2014, he's performed in Peru, Colombia, Panama, Costa Rica, Argentina, Ecuador, Mexico, Uruguay, Chile, and Bolivia.

In 2016, El Bananero showed a penis drawn on his chest in a live television interview for CNN Chile, saying that he wanted to share this on CNN before saying goodbye.

== Discography ==
=== Singles ===
==== As lead artist ====
- "Me Enamoré de Una Prostituta" (2005)
- "Cerveza Melorto" (2006)
- "Marrón Arruinado" (2005)
- "El Beso en el Chizito" (2007)
- "ACM1PTT" (2007)
- "Sandra" (2006)
- ”Ricardo" (2010)
- "Isabel, Sapee" (2018)
- "Sacudímela" (2019)
- "El Peluca, Sapee" (2019)
- "Felices Fiestas" (2017) (featuring Megapanza)
- "El Trap de Mia" (2020) (featuring Post Mamón)
- "Sopla la Vela" (2022)
- "Chupate una Japi" (2022) (featuring The Moors)
- "Es Viernes de Radio Garka" (2022)
- "Es Hora de Un Salute" (2022)
- "Dedicada a Jastin" (2024) (featuring The Moors)

==== As featured artist ====
- "Pensando en Cojer" (2014) (The Party Band featuring El Bananero
- "El Ganzo" (2020) (Asspera featuring El Bananero)
- "Duro 2 Horas Remix" (2021) (Faraón Love Shady featuring El Bananero)
