= Noriel =

Puerto Rican rapper

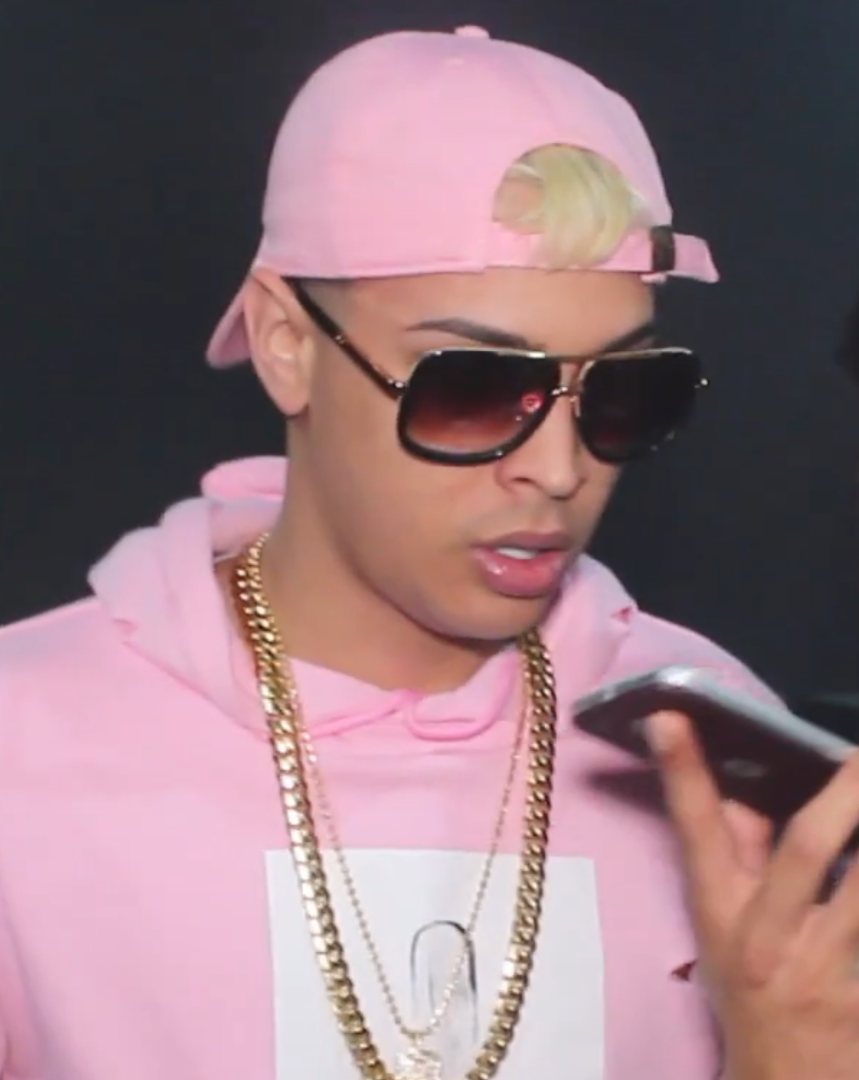
- Noriel in Mexico in 2017

Background information
- Born: Noel Santos Román; June 26, 1994 (age 32); Hato Rey, Puerto Rico
- Genres: Latin trap; reggaeton; Latin R&B
- Occupations: Rapper; songwriter
- Instrument: Vocals
- Years active: 2012–present
- Label: Sony Latin (2017–present)

Noel Santos Román (born June 26, 1994), known by his stage name Noriel, is a Puerto Rican rapper and songwriter. Noriel became known after singing with Maluma on his track "Cuatro Babys" and releasing a popular album called Trap Capos: Season 1.

== Discography ==
=== Studio albums ===
- Trap Capos: Season 1 (2016) (RIAA: 2× Platinum (Latin))
- Trap Capos II (2018) (RIAA: Platinum (Latin))
- Cerrando Capítulos (2021)
- Trap Island (2024)

=== Singles ===
==== As lead artist ====
List of singles as lead artist, with selected chart positions, showing year released and album name
Title	Year	Peak chart positions									Certifications	Album
Title	Year	US Latin	US Latin Airplay	US Latin Pop	US Trop.	CHI	COL	ECU	ES	SPA	Certifications	Album
"La Llamada" (Noriel featuring Brytiago)	2016	—	—	—	—	—	—	—	—	—		Non-album singles
"Fanático del Full" (Noriel featuring Darell, Baby Rasta and Ñengo Flow)	2016	—	—	—	—	—	—	—	—	—		Trap Capos: Season 1
"Diablita" (Noriel featuring Anuel AA and Baby Rasta)	2016	—	—	—	—	—	—	—	—	—		Trap Capos: Season 1
"Amigos y Enemigos"	2016	—	—	—	—	—	—	—	—	—	RIAA: 2× Platinum (Latin)	Trap Capos: Season 1
"La Llamada (Remix)" (Noriel featuring Brytiago, Darkiel, Almighty and Bryant Myers)	2016	—	—	—	—	—	—	—	—	—		Trap Capos: Season 1
"Quieres Enamorarme" (Noriel featuring Bryant Myers, Juhn and Baby Rasta)	2016	—	—	—	—	—	—	—	—	—		Trap Capos: Season 1
"Me Pelea" (Noriel featuring Baby Rasta, Lito Kirino, Miky Woodz, Juhn and Jochy)	2016	—	—	—	—	—	—	—	—	—		Trap Capos: Season 1
"Como Glopeta" (Noriel featuring Gigolo & La Exce, Miky Woodz, Juhn and Baby Angel)	2016	—	—	—	—	—	—	—	—	—		Trap Capos: Season 1
"La Paso Cabrón" (Noriel featuring Gigolo & La Exce, Falsetto & Sammy, Mike Duran and Baby Angel)	2016	—	—	—	—	—	—	—	—	—		Trap Capos: Season 1
"Plo Plo" (Noriel featuring Baby Rasta, Juanka el Problematik, Ñengo Flow and Pacho)	2016	—	—	—	—	—	—	—	—	—		Trap Capos: Season 1
"Desobediente" (Noriel featuring Alexis & Fido)	2017	—	—	—	—	—	—	—	—	—	RIAA: Gold (Latin)	Non-album singles
"Amigos y Enemigos (Remix)" (Noriel featuring Bad Bunny and Almighty)	2017	—	—	—	—	—	—	—	—	—		Non-album singles
"Desperté Sin Ti"	2017	23	—	—	—	—	—	—	—	—	RIAA: Gold (Latin)	Non-album singles
"Doble Personalidad" (Noriel featuring Yandel)	2017	—	—	—	—	—	—	—	—	—	RIAA: Platinum (Latin)	Trap Capos II
"Desperté Sin Ti (Remix)" (Noriel featuring Nicky Jam and Yandel)	2017	50	—	—	—	—	—	—	—	—	RIAA: 3× Platinum (Latin)	Non-album singles
"Antes y Después"	2018	—	—	—	—	—	—	—	—	—		Trap Capos II
"De las 2" (Noriel featuring Bad Bunny and Arcángel)	2018	47	—	—	—	—	—	—	—	—		Trap Capos II
"No Love" (Noriel featuring Prince Royce and Bryant Myers)	2018	—	—	—	—	—	—	—	—	—		Trap Capos II
"El Juego" (Noriel featuring Zion, Farruko, Lary Over and Jon Z)	2018	—	—	—	—	—	—	—	—	—		Trap Capos II
"Soy un Puto" (Noriel featuring Baby Rasta)	2018	—	—	—	—	—	—	—	—	—		Trap Capos II
"No Somos Ná" (Noriel featuring Gigolo & La Exce and Bryant Myers)	2018	—	—	—	—	—	—	—	—	—		Trap Capos II
"Amor Compartido" (Noriel featuring Juhn and Farruko)	2018	—	—	—	—	—	—	—	—	—		Trap Capos II
"Te Vas a Morir" (Noriel featuring Ele A el Dominio, Miky Woodz and Jon Z)	2018	—	—	—	—	—	—	—	—	—		Trap Capos II
"Porque Te Mientes" (Noriel featuring Gadiel and Bryant Myers)	2018	—	—	—	—	—	—	—	—	—		Trap Capos II
"El Problema"	2018	—	—	—	—	—	—	—	—	—		Trap Capos II
"Karma"	2018	—	—	—	—	—	—	—	—	—		Non-album singles
"No Somos Ná (Remix)" (Noriel with Gigolo & La Exce and Bryant Myers featuring Alex Rose, Amenazzy & Juhn)	2018	—	—	—	—	—	—	—	—	—		Non-album singles
"Karma (remix)" (Noriel featuring Darkiel, Divino, R.K.M & Ken-Y)	2019	—	—	—	—	—	—	—	—	—		Non-album singles
"No Te Hagas la Loca" (Noriel featuring Manuel Turizo)	2019	—	—	—	—	—	12	—	—	—	RIAA: Gold (Latin)	Non-album singles
"Cuerpo En Venta" (Noriel featuring Almighty, Myke Towers & Rauw Alejandro)	2019	—	—	—	—	—	—	—	—	72	RIAA: 3× Platinum (Latin)	Non-album singles
"Peleamos Mañana" (Jon Z, Baby Rasta & Noriel)	2019	—	—	—	—	—	—	—	—	—		Non-album singles
"Piropo"	2019	—	—	—	—	—	—	—	—	—	RIAA: Platinum (Latin)	Non-album singles
"4K" (with El Alfa and Darell)	2020	—	—	—	—	—	—	—	—	70		Non-album singles
"—" denotes a recording that did not chart or was not released in that territory.

==== As featured artist ====
List of singles as featured artist, with selected chart positions and certifications, showing year released and album name
Title	Year	Peak chart positions										Certifications	Album
Title	Year	US Latin	US Latin Airplay	US Latin Pop	US Trop.	ARG	CHI	COL	ECU	ES	SPA	Certifications	Album
"En El Callejon" (Barber Viernes 13 with Lawrentis featuring Johnny Stone, Kenxiel and Noriel)	2012	—	—	—	—	—	—	—	—	—	—		Non-album singles
"Nadie Me Toca" (Kenxiel featuring Noriel)	2014	—	—	—	—	—	—	—	—	—	—		Non-album singles
"Miedo a Morir" (Kenxiel featuring Noriel and Johnny Stone)	2014	—	—	—	—	—	—	—	—	—	—		Non-album singles
"No Se Les Va A Dar" (Kenxiel featuring Noriel, Lawrentis and Poulyric)	2014	—	—	—	—	—	—	—	—	—	—		Non-album singles
"En Su Nota" (Santana the Golden Boy featuring Baby Rasta, Anonimus, Bryant Myers, Noriel and Brytiago)	2015	—	—	—	—	—	—	—	—	—	—		Non-album singles
"Los Dueños" (Brytiago featuring Noriel, Pinto and Juhn)	2016	—	—	—	—	—	—	—	—	—	—		Non-album singles
"Sueños de Barrio" (Santana the Golden Boy featuring Baby Rasta, Tempo, Noriel, Gocho, Pusho, Ñengo Flow, Jenai and Alexio)	2016	—	—	—	—	—	—	—	—	—	—		Non-album singles
"Vente Encima" (Riko "El Bendecido" featuring Anonimus, Bryant Myers and Noriel)	2016	—	—	—	—	—	—	—	—	—	—		Non-album singles
"Ahora Me Llama (Remix)" (Juhn featuring Miky Woodz, Bryant Myers, Anonimus, Brytiago and Noriel)	2016	—	—	—	—	—	—	—	—	—	—	RIAA: Gold (Latin)	Non-album singles
"Mercancía" (Juhn featuring Miky Woodz, Lyan and Noriel)	2016	—	—	—	—	—	—	—	—	—	—		Non-album singles
"Maliante HP (remix)" (Benny Benni featuring Anuel AA, Farruko, Bryant Myers, Almighty, Darkiel and Nio García)	2016	—	—	—	—	—	—	—	—	—	—		Non-album singles
"Culpable (remix)" (Mike Duran featuring Anuel AA, Noriel, Darkiel, Bryant Myers and Kevin Roldán)	2016	—	—	—	—	—	—	—	—	—	—		Non-album singles
"De Camino a Marte (remix)" (Bryant Myers featuring Noriel, Juanka el Problematik, Brytiago, Almighty, Darkiel and Darell)	2016	—	—	—	—	—	—	—	—	—	—		Non-album singles
"Me Quieren Matar" (Superyei featuring Kendo Kaponi, Anuel AA, Farruko, Ozuna, Juanka el Problematik, Noriel, Pacho and Cosculluela)	2016	—	—	—	—	—	—	—	—	—	—		Non-album singles
"Cuatro Babys" (Maluma featuring Bryant Myers, Noriel and Juhn)	2016	15	—	—	—	—	—	21	—	—	55	RIAA: 12× Platinum (Latin)	Trap Capos: Season 1
"Vivimos Como Capos" (Obed featuring Noriel)	2016	—	—	—	—	—	—	—	—	—	—		Non-album singles
"0 Sentimientos (Remix)" (Jon Z featuring Baby Rasta, Noriel, Lyan, Darkiel and Messiah)	2016	—	—	—	—	—	—	—	—	—	—	RIAA: Platinum (Latin)	Non-album singles
"Jersey (Remix)" (Anuel AA with Sou El Flotador featuring Noriel, Brytiago, Yomo, Gotay, Miky Woodz, Tali, Lito Kirino and Darkiel)	2016	—	—	—	—	—	—	—	—	—	—		Non-album singles
"Rifles Prendidos" (Pancho & Castel featuring Noriel)	2016	—	—	—	—	—	—	—	—	—	—		Non-album singles
"El Gatito De Mi Ex" (Benny Benni featuring Noriel and Brytiago)	2017	—	—	—	—	—	—	—	—	—	—		Non-album singles
"Me Llueven 3.0" (Bad Bunny featuring Kevin Roldán, Noriel, Bryant Myers and Almighty)	2017	—	—	—	—	—	—	—	—	—	—		Non-album singles
"Ella" (Dayme & El High featuring Kevin Roldán, Noriel and Gaviria)	2017	—	—	—	—	—	—	—	—	—	—		Non-album singles
"Puerta Abierta" (Juhn featuring Bad Bunny and Noriel)	2017	—	—	—	—	—	—	—	—	—	—	RIAA: 2× Platinum (Latin)	Non-album singles
"Por Dinero" (Casper Mágico featuring Kendo Kaponi, Miky Woodz and Noriel)	2017	—	—	—	—	—	—	—	—	—	—		Non-album singles
"Yo También" (Arcángel featuring Noriel, Bryant Myers, Pusho, Anonimus and Gotay)	2017	—	—	—	—	—	—	—	—	—	—		Non-album singles
"Me Mata" (Bad Bunny with DJ Luian and Mambo Kingz featuring Arcángel, Almighty, Bryant Myers, Baby Rasta, Noriel and Brytiago)	2017	—	—	—	—	—	—	—	—	—	—		Non-album singles
"Ayer" (Amenazzy featuring Noriel)	2017	—	—	—	—	—	—	—	—	—	—	RIAA: Gold (Latin)	Non-album singles
"Bajen Pa' Ca" (Bryant Myers featuring Noriel)	2017	—	—	—	—	—	—	—	—	—	—	RIAA: Gold (Latin)	Non-album singles
"Aparentemente" (Sinfónico featuring Darell, Miky Woodz, Noriel and Maximus Wel)	2017	—	—	—	—	—	—	—	—	—	—		Non-album singles
"Stripper" (Andy Rivera featuring Noriel)	2017	—	—	—	—	—	—	—	—	—	—		Non-album singles
"Bebé de Papá" (Amarion featuring Noriel and Alexio)	2017	—	—	—	—	—	—	—	—	—	—		Non-album singles
"Busy" (Dayme & El High featuring Kevin Roldán, Noriel, Baby Rasta and Gaviria)	2017	—	—	—	—	—	—	—	—	—	—		Non-album singles
"Escápate Conmigo (remix)" (Wisin featuring Ozuna, Bad Bunny, De La Ghetto, Arcángel, Noriel and Almighty)	2017	—	—	—	—	—	—	—	—	—	—		Non-album singles
"Banda de Camión (Remix)" (El Alfa El Jefe featuring Noriel, Bryant Myers, Farruko, Zion, De La Ghetto and Villano Sam)	2017	—	—	—	—	—	—	—	—	—	—	RIAA: Gold (Latin)	Non-album singles
"Puerto Rico Sigue en Recovery" (La ONU featuring Noriel, Almighty, Jon Z, Lenny Tavárez, Juhn and Darkiel)	2017	—	—	—	—	—	—	—	—	—	—		Non-album singles
"Secreto" (Lenny Tavárez featuring Noriel)	2017	—	—	—	—	—	—	—	—	—	—		Non-album singles
"Knock Out" (Shelow Shaq featuring Noriel and La Manta)	2017	—	—	—	—	—	—	—	—	—	—		Non-album singles
"El Gatito De Mi Ex (Remix)" (Benny Benni featuring Brytiago, Noriel, Darkiel, Pusho, Juhn and Gigolo & La Exce)	2017	—	—	—	—	—	—	—	—	—	—		Non-album singles
"Calentura (Remix)" (Juhn featuring Noriel, Lenny Tavárez, Jon Z and Miky Woodz)	2017	—	—	—	—	—	—	—	—	—	—		Non-album singles
"Tacos Altos" (Alex Gargola featuring Arcángel, Noriel, Farruko and Bryant Myers)	2017	—	—	—	—	—	—	—	—	—	—	RIAA: Gold (Latin)	Non-album singles
"Ocho (Remix)" (Almighty featuring Randy, Juanka el Problematik, Noriel, Bryant Myers, Kendo Kaponi, Ñengo Flow and Pusho)	2017	—	—	—	—	—	—	—	—	—	—		Non-album singles
"Los Míos Ganan (remix)" (Miky Woodz with Juhn featuring Noriel and Pusho)	2017	—	—	—	—	—	—	—	—	—	—		Non-album singles
"Duro y Suave" (Leslie Grace featuring Noriel)	2018	49	36	28	—	—	2	14	8	12	7	RIAA: 4× Platinum (Latin); PROMUSICAE: Platinum	Non-album singles
"El Combo Me Llama 2" (Benny Benni with Pusho featuring Bad Bunny, Daddy Yankee, Pusho, Noriel, Farruko and Miky Woodz)	2018	—	—	—	—	—	—	—	—	—	—		Non-album singles
"Romper El Hielo" (Fanny Lu featuring Noriel)	2018	—	—	—	—	—	—	—	—	—	—		Non-album singles
"Indomable" (Montana the Producer featuring Noriel, Jon Z and Jory Boy)	2018	—	—	—	—	—	—	—	—	—	—		Non-album singles
"Hecha Completa" (EZ el Ezeta featuring Chucho Flash, Noriel, Ñengo Flow and Baby Rasta)	2018	—	—	—	—	—	—	—	—	—	—		Non-album singles
"Bicho Loco (Remix)" (Ardilla featuring Noriel, El Alfa El Jefe, La Manta, Shelow Shaq, Miky Woodz and Benny Benni)	2018	—	—	—	—	—	—	—	—	—	—		Non-album singles
"No Te Vas" (Nacho featuring Wisin, Noriel)	2018	—	—	—	—	—	—	—	—	—	—		Non-album singles
"Explícale (Remix)" (Yandel with Bad Bunny featuring Cosculluela, Noriel and Brytiago)	2018	—	—	—	—	—	—	—	—	—	—		Non-album singles
"Fuego" (Kendo Kaponi featuring Bryant Myers, Pacho, Anonimus and Noriel)	2018	—	—	—	—	—	—	—	—	—	—		Non-album singles
"Donde Tú Te Ves" (Miky Woodz featuring Noriel)	2018	—	—	—	—	—	—	—	—	—	—		El OG
"Me Tire a Tus Amigas" (Jon Z featuring Noriel)	2018	—	—	—	—	—	—	—	—	—	—		Non-album singles
"Me Compre Un Full (Avengers Version)" (Sinfónico featuring Almighty, Noriel, Miky Woodz and Pusho)	2018	—	—	—	—	—	—	—	—	—	—		Non-album singles
"Curiosidad" (DJ Luian and Mambo Kingz featuring Yandel, Zion, Jon Z and Noriel)	2018	—	—	—	—	—	—	—	—	—	—		Non-album singles
"No Te Creo" (Felipe Pelaéz featuring Nacho and Noriel)	2018	—	—	—	—	—	—	—	—	—	—		Non-album singles
"Me Rindo" (Santana the Golden Boy featuring Amenazzy and Noriel)	2018	—	—	—	—	—	—	—	—	—	—		Non-album singles
"Darte (Remix)" (Alex Rose with Myke Towers featuring Bryant Myers, Casper Mágico, Jhay Cortez, Juhn, Miky Woodz, Noriel and Ñengo Flow)	2018	—	—	—	—	—	—	—	—	—	—	RIAA: 4× (Latin)	Non-album singles
"No Sabe Nah (Remix)" (Benny Benni with Lary Over featuring Alexio, Farruko, Juhn and Noriel	2018	—	—	—	—	—	—	—	—	—	—		Non-album singles
"Viajo Sin Ver (Remix)" (Jon Z featuring Almighty, Miky Woodz, Ele A el Dominio, Juanka El Problematik, Jeycyn, Lyan, Pusho, De La Ghetto, El Alfa El Jefe and Noriel)	2018	—	—	—	—	—	—	—	—	—	—	RIAA: Gold (Latin)	Non-album singles
"Suave (Remix)" (El Alfa El Jefe featuring Chencho Corleone "Plan B", Miky Woodz, Jon Z, Noriel, Bryant Myers)	2018	—	—	—	—	—	—	—	—	—	—		Non-album singles
"Me Usaste" (Alex Gargolas featuring Jon Z, Juhn, Noriel, Khea, Ecko and Eladio Carrion)	2018	—	—	—	—	48	—	—	—	—	—	RIAA: Gold (Latin)	Non-album singles
"Una Vez Más" (Manuel Turizo featuring Noriel)	2018	—	—	—	—	—	—	—	—	—	—		Non-album singles
"Dile A Tu Marido" (Pasaborda featuring Noriel)	2018	—	—	—	—	—	—	—	—	—	—		Non-album singles
"Decídete" (Pacho featuring Noriel)	2018	—	—	—	—	—	—	—	—	—	—		Non-album singles
"Dios Bendiga" (Amenazzy featuring Noriel)	2018	—	—	—	—	—	—	—	—	—	—		Non-album singles
"Hoy Me Desacato / Dale Pipo (Remix)" (Bulova featuring Nacho, Noriel & El Alfa)	2018	—	—	—	—	—	—	—	—	—	—		Non-album singles
"El Teléfono" (Anonimus featuring Ele A el Dominio, Lyanno & Noriel)	2018	—	—	—	—	—	—	—	—	—	—		Non-album singles
"Noche Loca (Remix)" (Oken, Mora & Myke Towers featuring De La Ghetto, Bryant Myers, Juhn & Noriel)	2018	—	—	—	—	—	—	—	—	—	—		Non-album singles
"No Tiene Novio" (Lyanno featuring Noriel)	2019	—	—	—	—	—	—	—	—	—	—		Non-album singles
"Se Moja" (Alex Gargolas featuring Amenazzy, Eladio Carrion, Noriel and Rauw Alejandro)	2019	—	—	—	—	—	—	—	—	—	—		Non-album singles
"Yo Te Llamo" (Joey Montana featuring De La Ghetto and Noriel)	2019	—	—	—	—	—	—	—	—	—	—		Non-album singles
"Fuego en el Fuego (Remix)" (Darkiel featuring Juhn, Myke Towers and Noriel)	2019	—	—	—	—	—	—	—	—	—	—		Darkiel Edition: El Más Que Escribe
"Error" (Almighty featuring Noriel)	2019	—	—	—	—	—	—	—	—	—	—		La Bestia
"Tambor" (Almighty featuring Noriel)	2019	—	—	—	—	—	—	—	—	—	—		La Bestia
"Ella Te Las Va A Pegar" (Jon Z & Baby Rasta featuring Noriel and Ele A el Dominio)	2019	—	—	—	—	—	—	—	—	—	—		Voodoo
"Otro Round" (Brytiago featuring Jon Z and Noriel)	2019	—	—	—	—	—	—	—	—	—	—		Orgánico
"Mal de Amores" (Benny Benny featuring Noriel)	2019	—	—	—	—	—	—	—	—	—	—		El Más Que Escribe
"Verano en París (Remix)" (Jerry Di featuring Lyanno, Noriel and Zion & Lennox)	2019	—	—	—	—	—	—	—	—	—	—		Non-album singles
"Brujería" (Nicky Jam featuring Noriel) (Still in production)	2019	—	—	—	—	—	—	—	—	—	—		Íntimo
"—" denotes a recording that did not chart or was not released in that territory.
