= Tapir 590 =

Peruvian social media personality

- Born: Óliver Ramos; March 28, 1989 (age 37); Tacna, Peru
- Other names: Quinientos Noventa; 590 Tapir; Billy 590; El Tapir Malo; Tapir el Elegante
- Education: Francisco Antonio de Zela Private Technological Institute; University of Tarapacá
- Occupations: Social media personality; entertainer; singer; songwriter
- Years active: 2019-present

YouTube information
- Channel: tapir 590
- Genres: Varied; humor; vlog
- Subscribers: 30 thousand
- Views: 1.6 million
- Musical career
- Genres: Reggaeton
- Instruments: Vocals; electric guitar
- Last updated: October 22, 2025

Óliver Ramos (born March 29, 1989), known by his nickname Tapir 590, is a Peruvian social media personality. He became known for his luxury lifestyle videos and his catchphrase "Claro pe', mascota" (transl. "Of course, pet").

== Career ==
Tapir 590 started uploading videos on his social networks around January 2019. His content was varied, and included showing off his luxuries, owning expensive objects, and giving "advice", thus provoking the derision of his followers. One of his first viral videos was "Cómo conquistar a una venezolana" ("How to conquer a Venezuelan [girl]"). Also contributing to his fame was his catchphrase "Claro pe', mascota".

After he became popular, he was invited to appear on TV shows such as El wasap de JB and El reventonazo de la chola, where he performed a cover of "Secreto" with Susy Díaz. He made his debut as a reggaeton singer in March 2019 with the release of his first single "Concha, Conchita", and later performed covers of other songs. He also acted in sketch comedy videos on other YouTube channels.

In April 2019, he announced that he would stop uploading videos, due to the existence of other accounts that used his name and profited from his followers. However, he soon reappeared, saying that he had been busy doing radio and television work.

In the latest stage of his career, Tapir says that he is focusing on his musical growth. Tapir accuses rapper Faraón Love Shady of "copying his ideas and style", which is why he put aside content creation.

== Education ==
Ramos claims to be a business administrator by profession. He studied for three years at the Francisco Antonio de Zela Private Technological Institute in Tacna and four cycles at the University of Tarapacá in Chile. He also studied music and took courses to be a bodyguard.

== Reception and impact ==
In 2022, the Peruvian newspaper La República included his catchphrase, "Claro pe', mascota", in its list of the "most popular phrases of the last 10 years in Peru". This same phrase was interpolated in the ninth season of the television series Al fondo hay sitio, by the character Diego Montalbán (Giovanni Ciccia).
