= Darkiel =

Puerto Rican reggaeton artist and actor

- Born: Omar David Hernández Colón; January 21, 1994 (age 32); Lares, Puerto Rico
- Origin: Puerto Rico
- Genres: Reggaeton; urban pop
- Occupations: Singer; actor
- Instrument: Vocals
- Years active: 2014–present
- Label: On Fire

Omar David Hernández Colón, known as Darkiel (born January 21, 1994), is a Puerto Rican reggaeton singer and actor, born in Lares. He is better known for his role in the Netflix biographical series of Nicky Jam called Nicky Jam: El Ganador.

== Career ==
Darkiel started his career at the age of nineteen with social media, doing freestyles on Facebook page Freestyle Mania Music. His inspirations are Daddy Yankee and Don Omar.

Darkiel has issued over two dozen video singles. They include "Ella Me Oculta," "Aqui Estas Tu" (and a remix), "Si Me Apagan el Sol", "Montate y Zumba", and a lyric video of the J Alvarez remix of "De una Forma Diferente" that gained over 300,000 views within four days of posting it in August 2016. Darkiel's videos have amassed over 40 million views on YouTube.

Darkiel acted in the biographical series Nicky Jam: El Ganador, based on the story of American reggaeton artist Nicky Jam, as the younger self of the latter.

In 2019, Cárdenas Marketing Network, a company that has marketed other Puerto Rican musicians such as Bad Bunny and Marc Anthony, began work with Darkiel.

== Lyrics ==
His lyrics talk about the ups and downs of romance and Darkiel has said that he "doesn’t need to be explicit to be liked by youth". He has been praised for releasing "clean reggaeton".

At one time he stated he did not want to be part of the Latin trap, saying in Spanish:

I have participated in some remix of songs, such as with Bryant Myers, Anuel AA, Noriel, in which they appear. I even have some trap which are not that explicit.

and

I like trap’s music, I like its rhythm. But it’s not a line I want to focus on.
