= Faraón Love Shady =

Peruvian rapper, singer and internet personality

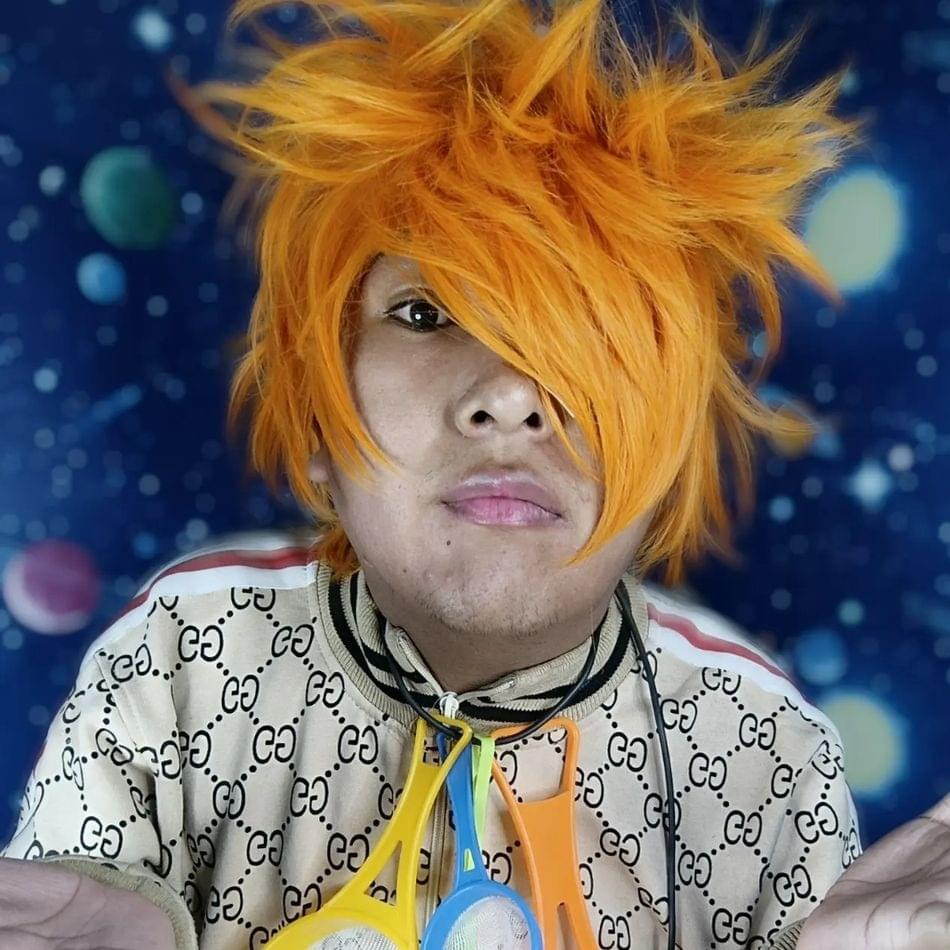
- Faraón Love Shady in 2022

Background information
- Also known as: El Dios del Trap; El Dios de la Versatilidad
- Born: Willyan Jesús Valle Choque (Note: According to certain sources, his name is Jesús Valle Choque. In an interview with Billboard Argentina he revealed that his middle name is Willyan. However, in the credits of his songs "Sexy" and "Tengo Pesadillas", the songwriter is mentioned as Willyan Jesús Paye Choque.); 20 July 2000 (age 26) (Note: Some media published his date of birth, being those that affirm that it is August 19, 2000 and others on July 20, 2000. It is assumed that this last date is the most reliable, since Faraón has assured in his social networks that his birthday on July 20.); Arequipa, Peru
- Genres: Latin trap; reggaeton
- Occupations: Rapper; singer; songwriter; social media personality
- Years active: 2019–present
- Label: Híbrido Gang (2020–present)

Willyan Jesús Valle Choque (born July 20, 2000), known by his stage name Faraón Love Shady, is a Peruvian rapper, singer, songwriter and social media personality. He is noted for his extravagant and colorful style of clothing, in addition to his lyrics with sexual content and his self-improvement.

He started in 2019 posting vlogs on his social media and later debuted in music with his first single "Sin Condón". His most viral song is "Duro 2 Horas", although he has also gained popularity for other songs such as "Soy Guapo", "Oh, Me Vengo", "Panocha", “Panocha Remix” "I Am Happy", "Freestyle Session #13 "RIP Resentido"", and "Cunumi".

== Biography ==
=== 2000–2019: Early life and music debut ===
Jesús was born on July 25, 2000, in Arequipa, Peru, the third of seven siblings and the child of two farmers. He worked as a street vendor of different products and got on buses to sing, as a source of work.

Under the pseudonym of Faraón Love Shady, he began creating content on social media, mainly doing challenges and video blogs about his life in Arequipa. His rise to fame was heavily influenced by the Peruvian YouTuber Andynsane who published a video about him. Jesús was presented as the "replacement for Tapir 590".

In August 2019, he debuted his single "Sin Condón". In November 2019, he released his second single "Panocha", which was more successful and managed to position itself in YouTube trends in Peru.

=== 2020–2021: "Panocha Remix" and viral explosion ===
In June 2020, he published "Panocha Remix" in collaboration with Puerto Rican rappers Jon Z and Ele A el Dominio. That same month, he released the single "Una Cunumi (remix)" featuring J Gonzo, Ose, and Xvideo Token for Bolivian singer Qmayb; and "Por el Asterisco" with Puerto Rican rapper Kevvo.

In August 2020, he released his most popular song on YouTube "Oh, Me Vengo", with which he again ranked first in trends on YouTube in Peru and in four days reached the figure of one million views. That same month he released "Soy Guapo". These two songs were the first he made with the record label Híbrido Gang Music, whose name alludes to what he calls his fans, "híbrido gang".

After the growth of his popularity, Love Shady was interviewed by media such as Trap House Latino, La Zona, and Billboard Argentina. In November 2020, he was invited to the América Televisión TV show El Reventonazo de la Chola, where he performed the song "Ponte Mascarilla" with Peruvian singer La Tigresa del Oriente. Later, he participated in Trap Live Peru 2020, a virtual concert produced by Blackstar Records.

In July 2021 he released "Duro 2 Horas Remix" featuring American-Uruguayan comedian El Bananero. In September 2021, he published "Gamer Over, Fantasmay", a diss directed to Argentine rapper Zaramay. Previously, they had been feuding on social media. The music video on YouTube managed to enter the list of trends in Peru, Argentina, and other Spanish-speaking countries.

=== 2022–present: "Freestyle Session #13: RIP Resentido" and concerts ===
In February 2022, he announced a tour of Mexico that includes performances in Playa del Carmen, Cancún, Mexico City, Guadalajara, and Monterrey, in March. However, the concerts were postponed until June, and some of them were canceled.

In April 2022, he premiered his second diss, against the Puerto Rican rapper Residente, entitled "Freestyle Session #13: RIP Resentido". The song generated a great impact on the Internet, the video exceeded the figure of one million views in less than a day and ranked number one in YouTube trends. The context of the tiraera originates from the controversy between Residente and Colombian singer J Balvin, and, with it, the launch of "Bzrp Music Sessions, Vol. 49". Love Shady previously demonstrated his disagreement with Residente and his support for Balvin through stories on his Instagram account. Regarding the song, in an Instagram post where Faraón promotes the single, Residente commented: "You're the best. I'm your fan. Keep hitting it hard and writing", to which Jesús replied: "Residente, thanks. Since you're wearing the 'R' I await your answer. This is resolved in the booth", followed by a story: "Thanks for accepting it, it's good to add one more fan, I've always hit him hard and that's only 13% of my potential."

In May 2022, he performed a concert in Arequipa, his hometown, being his first concert in 2 years; followed by other appearances in Cochabamba, Chiclayo, Juliaca, Tingo María, Lima, Trujillo, Piura, Tacna, etc. In November 2022 he is announced as one of the artists present at the Electric Daisy Carnival electronic music festival, which will take place in February 2023 in Mexico.

In March 2024, he participates in the remix of the single "Jugo de Tu Xoxa" with Puerto Rican artists Durán the Coach and Luigi 21 Plus.

== Musical style and influences ==
Faraón described himself as El Dios del Trap ("The God of Trap") and El Dios de la Versatilidad ("The God of Versatility"). His fans are known as the "híbrido gang". His videos show him with different necklaces that attract the attention of the public, including many mocking reactions.

Faraón cites American rapper 6ix9ine as his favorite and has publicly expressed his support for 6ix9ine being released from jail. In addition, his hair highlights show great admiration for the artist. While many of his songs include sexually explicit lyrics, he has avoided lyrics that explicitly objectify or disrespect women. Faraón has stated that his music and lyrics are sexually explicit and "women shouldn't be offended because it is aimed at hot women who like to be talked dirty to," according to him, "that turns them on". His songs often speak of relationships and heartbreaks, inspired by what other artists are doing and what his audience wants.

As the Colombian singer J Balvin describes, "What do I think of Faraón Love Shady? It seems to me that he is a person who represents his country, in his way and his style, each person has their or way of doing things."

== Discography ==
=== Singles ===
==== As lead artist ====
Title	Year	Peak chart positions	
Title	Year	PAR	PER
"Sin Condón"	2019	—	—
"Panocha"	2019	—	—
"Sexy"	2020	—	—
"Rockstar"	2020	—	—
"Panocha Remix" (featuring Ele A el Dominio and Jon Z)	2020	—	—
"Por el Asterisco" (Faraón Love Shady and Kevvo)	2020	—	—
"Oh, Me Vengo"	2020	—	—
"Soy Guapo"	2020	—	—
"Duro 2 Horas"	2020	300	2836
"Harley Quinn"	2020	—	—
"Perreo en la Mesa"	2020	—	—
"Booty"	2021	—	—
"Tengo Pesadillas"	2021	—	—
"Duro 2 Horas Remix" (featuring El Bananero)	2021	—	—
"Game Over, Fantasmay"	2021	—	—
"Cunumi"	2021	—	—
"Reggaeton de la Mata"	2021	—	—
"I Am Happy"	2022	—	—
"Freestyle Session #13 "RIP Resentido""	2022	—	—
"Chica Empoderada"	2022	—	—
"Freestyle Legend #14"	2022	—	—
"Vámonos a Marte"	2022	—	—
"Recipiente de Leche"	2023	—	—
"Soy Pingón"	2023	—	—
"Jugo de Tu Xoxa" (remix) (Durán the Coach, Luigi 21 Plus and Faraón Love Shady)	2024	—	—
"Ya Soy Millonario"	2024	—	—
"Bien Grandes" (Faraón Love Shady and Dani Flow)	2024	—	—
"No Toxic"	2025	—	—
"—" denotes a recording that did not chart.

==== As featured artist ====
Title	Year	Peak chart positions	
Title	Year	PAR	PER
"Una Cunumi" (remix) (Qmayb featuring J. Gonzo, Ose, Faraón Love Shady and Xvideo Token)	2020	652	1442

== Videography ==
=== Music videos ===
- Sin Condón (2019)
- Panocha (2019)
- Sexy (2020)
- Oh, Me Vengo (2020)
- Soy Guapo (2020)
- Duro 2 Horas (2020)
- Harley Quinn (2020)
- Perreo en la Mesa (2020)
- Booty (2021)
- Tengo Pesadillas (2021)
- Game Over, Fantasmay (2021)
- Cunumi (2021)
- Reggaeton de la Mata (2021)
- RIP Resentido (Freestyle Session #13) (2022)
- Chica Empoderada (2022)
- Freestyle Legend #14 (2022)
- Vámonos a Marte (2022)
- I Am Happy (2023)
- RIP Recipiente (2023)
- Ya Soy Millonario (2024)
- Bien Grandes (2024)
- No Toxic (2025)

== Awards and nominations ==
Award	Year	Category	Nominee / Work	Result	Ref.
CP Awards	2021	Best National Artist	Himself	Won	
CP Awards	2021	Best National Song	"Panocha Remix"	Nominated	
