= Duro y suave =

"Duro y Suave"

Single by Leslie Grace & Noriel
- Language: Spanish
- English title: "Hard and Soft"
- Released: January 19, 2018
- Genre: Reggaeton; urban; Latin pop
- Length: 3:27

"Duro y Suave" (transl. "Hard and Soft") is a song by American singer Leslie Grace featuring Puerto Rican rapper Noriel, released as a single on January 19, 2018. Written by both artists along with a team of songwriters and produced by Primera, Cáceres, and Marrufo, it blends reggaeton, urban and Latin pop genres. The single was certified Platinum in Mexico.

== Composition and launch ==
It is a reggaeton, urban, and Latin pop song. It features synthesizers and vocal effects. According to its musical structure, it is written in the key of B-flat minor and has a tempo of 95 beats per minute. The song was composed by Leslie Grace, Noriel, Camilo, Yasmil Marrufo, Mario Cáceres, and Servando Primera, while production was handled by Servando Primera, Mario Cáceres, and Yasmil Marrufo. It was released as a single on January 19, 2018. Grace announced the song's release on her social media three days earlier, on January 16.

== Charts ==
Weekly chart positions obtained by "Duro y suave" (2018).
Lists (2018)	Best position
Argentina (Argentina Hot 100)	32
Spain (Promusicae)	7
United States (Hot Latin Songs)	49
United States (Latin Airplay)	36

== Certifications ==
Certifications obtained for Leslie Grace and Noriel's "Duro y suave".
Country	Certifying body	Certification	Certified sales	Ref.
Spain	PROMUSICAE	Platinum	180 000	
United States	RIAA	Platinum	240 000	
México	AMPROFON	Platinum	—	
