= Kevin Roldán =

Colombian singer

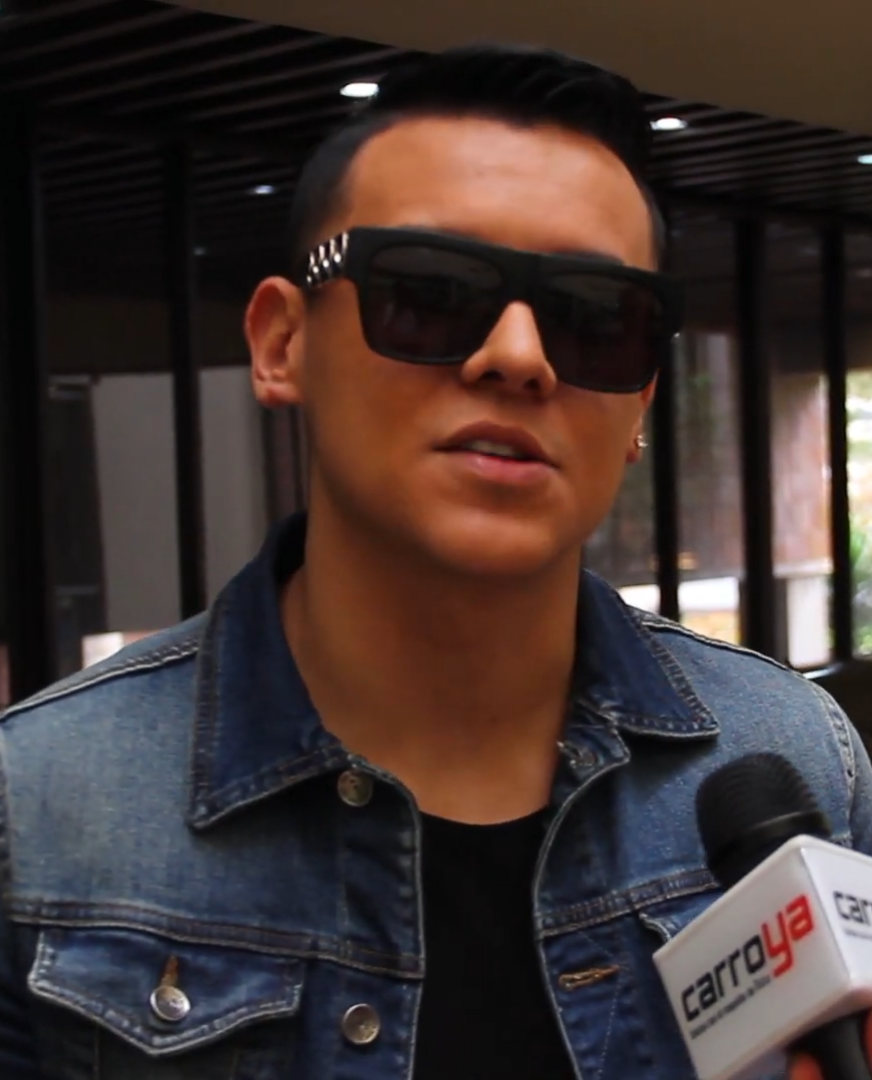
- Kevin Roldán in 2014

Background information
- Born: Ronny Kevin Roldán Velasco; Cali, Colombia
- Genres: Reggaeton; Latin trap; Latin pop
- Occupations: Singer; songwriter; music producer
- Instrument: Vocals
- Labels: Universal Latino; Kapital; King Records
- Website: kevin-roldan.com

Ronny Kevin Roldán Velasco is a Colombian singer, songwriter and music producer.

== Biography ==
In 2013, Roldán signed a deal with Kapital Music and released his first song "Salgamos" with Andy Rivera and Maluma, being featured in the song and rapidly climbed to number 1 on the music charts of Colombia and the song now has over 300 million views on YouTube. The song was also popular in Latin America and Spain which earned it gold.

In 2015, Roldán was invited to the birthday party of soccer player Cristiano Ronaldo. In the party he was seen alongside several other famous soccer players from Real Madrid like James Rodríguez, Keylor Navas, and Marcelo. which caused controversy in social media and the sports world. Months later he was mentioned by Gerard Piqué. That same year he released two more singles: "Nadie como Tú" and "Contigo".

In 2016, he signed with the music label Universal Music Latino and recorded several songs such as "Me Matas" with Arcángel. While in Argentina, Roldán met Luciano Clivo, a friend of Puerto Rican rapper Bryant Myers, who suggested that Roldán work with Myers, and they released "¿Por Qué Sigues con Él?" (remix).

== Discography ==
=== EPs ===
- 2015: Kevin Roldán: Special Edition
- 2016: Rich Kid
- 2018: Volvió KR
- 2019: KRING
- 2021: BOFFF
- 2023: KR & BRYANT MA

=== Songs as main artist ===
- 2010: "Cambiaste Mi Vida" (ft. Crissin)
- 2011: "Booty Booty" (Te Ves Bien)
- 2011: "Soy Yo"
- 2012: "Tú No Sabes"
- 2012: "Sensación Sermosa"
- 2012: "Chévere"
- 2012: "Con Flow Mátalo" (ft. J Balvin, Maluma, Reykon, Dragón & Caballero, Jay & el Punto)
- 2013: "Party"
- 2013: "Salgamos" (ft. Maluma, Andy Rivera)
- 2013: "Inevitable"
- 2013: "Party (Remix)" (ft. Nicky Jam)
- 2014: "Una Noche Más" (ft. Nicky Jam)
- 2014: "Si No Te Enamoras"
- 2014: "Hay Mujeres" (ft. Alberto Stylee
- 2014: "Cuando Sales Sola"
- 2015: "Nadie como Tú" (Eres Mi Droga)
- 2015: "Contigo"
- 2015: "Me Matas" (ft. Arcángel)
- 2015: "De Fiesta" (remix) (ft. Dayme y El High)
- 2016: "Soy La Historia"
- 2016: "Aprovéchame"
- 2016: "Tú y Yo"
- 2016: "Sola"
- 2016: "Soltera" (ft. Alexio)
- 2016: "Una Noche"
- 2016: "Ruleta Rusa"
- 2016: "Tu Cuerpo" (ft. Falsetto)
- 2016: "Me Tienes Loco"
- 2017: "Na Na Na"
- 2017: "Tranquilo" (ft. Bad Bunny)
- 2017: "Me Nace Falta" (ft. Nene La Amenaza)
- 2017: "Me Gustas"
- 2017: "Eres Mi Todo" (ft. Karol G)
- 2017: "Teddy" (ft. Nacho)
- 2017: "Una Trampa"
- 2018: "PPP"
- 2019: "PPP" (ft. Zion & Lennox)
- 2019: "Deseos" (ft. Wisin)
- 2019: "Hasta Abajo" (ft. Bryant Myers and Lyanno)
- 2020: "BB"
- 2022: "Bésame" (with Omar Montes)
- 2024: "Lo Que Necesito" (with Mario Hart)
- 2024: "Peligro Session 4 (Azotarte)" (with DJ Peligro)
- 2025: "Break your Heart" (with Drake Bell)
