= Jon Z =

Puerto Rican rapper, singer and record producer

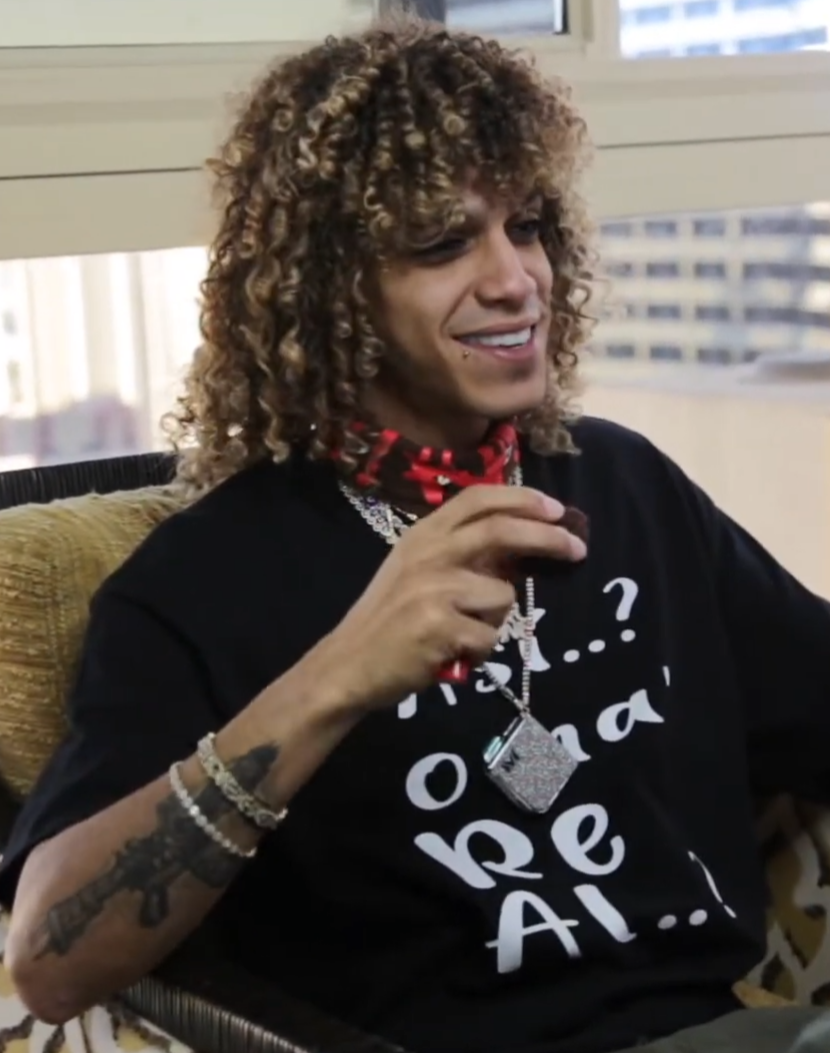
- Jon Z in 2019

Background information
- Also known as: Jon Z
- Born: Jonathan Resto Quiñones; May 20, 1991 (age 34); Humacao, Puerto Rico
- Genres: Latin trap; reggaeton
- Occupations: Rapper; singer; record producer
- Years active: 2011–present
- Labels: Sony Latin; Chosen Few Emeralds

Jonathan Resto Quiñones (born May 20, 1991), known professionally as Jon Z, is a Puerto Rican rapper and record producer.

He was nominated for "Song of the Year" Urbano / Trap in Premios Lo Nuestro 2020 and in two categories in the Premios Tu Música Urbana.

Jon Z has collaborated with high-profile artists such as Enrique Iglesias, Yellow Claw, Farruko, Almighty, Arcángel, Ñengo Flow, Baby Rasta, Wisin, Don Chezina, among others, who have been in high positions on the Billboard list and have received RIAA certifications.

== Career ==
Jon Z was born in Humacao and raised in Juncos. His career began in 2011 when he was part of the duo J-Tonez and Jon Z for almost 2 years, with which he decided to release his first single entitled «Nunca te veo» and some other singles that he later released as «El dinero me llama», «Háblame de dinero», among others. In 2013 he started uploading freestyle videos on YouTube. Jon Z is cousins with Ele A El Dominio, with whom he made the Super Saiyan Flow mixtape.

His debut album, JonTrapVolta, was released in 2017.

== Discography ==
=== Studio albums ===
- The Game is About to Change (2015)
- JonTrapVolta (2017)
- Voodoo (with Baby Rasta) (2019)
- Perdonen la espera(2020)
- Projecto Z (2022)
- Real(2024)

=== Mixtapes ===
- SuperSaiyanFlow (with Ele A El Dominio) (2018)

=== Singles ===
- "Pal Party" (2015)
- "Sigo Tranquilo" (2015)
- "Mentirte" (2016)
- "No Pares" (2016)
- "0 Sentimientos" (2016)
- "0 Sentimientos" (Remix) (featuring Noriel, Darkiel, Lyan, Messiah and Baby Rasta) (2016)
- "Buenas & Malas" (2016)
- "Violeta" (featuring Lyan) (2017)
- "Vas a Querer Volver" (featuring Ñengo Flow) (2017)
- "Nunca me amo" (2017) (with Baby Rasta)
- "Infinito" (2018)
- "Falso Amor" (with Arcángel) (2018)
- "Después Que Te Perdí" (with Enrique Iglesias) (2019)
- "Ya No Eres Mia" (2019) (with Baby Rasta)
- "Iris Chacon" (2020)

=== As featured artist ===
- "Hasta Que Lo Piedres" (Remix) (Jenny la Sexy Voz featuring Jon Z and Mestiza) (2016)
- "Pegao" (Remix) (Bebo Yau featuring Jon Z) (2016)
- "Go Loko" (YG featuring Tyga and Jon Z) (2019)
- "El Terror" (Yellow Claw featuring Jon Z and Lil Toe) (2019)
- "Panocha (Remix)" (Faraón Love Shady featuring Jon Z and Ele A El Dominio) (2020)
- "Quieres Munchies (Remix)" (Daniel El Travieso featuring Jon Z) (2021)

== Filmography ==
- Nicky Jam: El Ganador (TV series, 2 episodes) as Piri (2018)
- Blue Beetle (film) (Movie) as Dude #3 (2023)
