= Ele A el Dominio =

Puerto Rican rapper, singer and songwriter

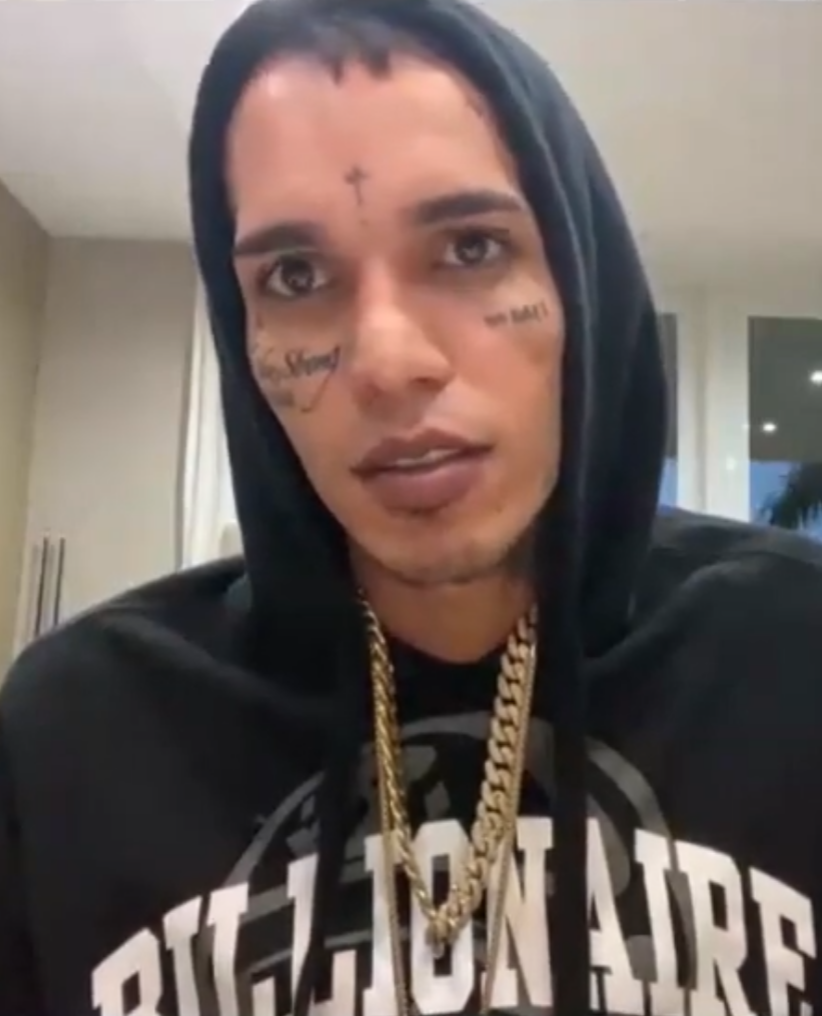
- Ele A el Dominio in 2020

Background information
- Also known as: Ele A el Dominio; El Dominio; Ele A
- Born: Luis Abner Mojica Sierra; August 17, 1988 (age 38); Juncos, Puerto Rico
- Genres: Latin trap; Latin R&B; reggaeton
- Occupations: Rapper; singer; songwriter
- Label: Codeine Niggas

Luis Abner Mojica Sierra (born 17 August 1988), better known as Ele A el Dominio, is a Puerto Rican Latin trap and reggaeton rapper, singer and songwriter.

== Career ==
Ele A El Dominio is cousins with Jon Z, with whom he made the Super saiyan flow mixtape. His mixtapes and singles have garnered over a million views on YouTube. He has risen to fame with songs such as "No podemos" which had a remix, "De matar tengo hambre", "Yo me la robé", "Maliantiando" and "Pal bote", which captured the eye of fans of underground hip hop. He is controversial for his social media conflicts, including public problems with artists such as Bad Bunny addressed by his track "Me tragué al Pacino" that discusses shooting the rapper and DJ Luian. He also has problems with Anuel AA. El Dominio deliberately resists more commercial topics and music-making methods. His 2017 Mi Perico Remix mixtape with Arcángel, Ñejo and Ñengo Flow proved influential in raising his profile. He also worked with Ozuna in the song "Balenciaga" and with Faraón Love Shady in "Panocha Remix".
