= Almighty (rapper) =

Cuban rapper

- Born: Alejandro Mosqueda Paz; 20 January 1995 (age 31); Havana, Cuba
- Origin: Carolina, Puerto Rico
- Genres: Latin trap; reggaeton; Christian hip-hop
- Occupations: Rapper; singer; songwriter
- Instrument: Vocals
- Years active: 2009–present
- Labels: Carbon Fiber; La Industria de los Inmortales

Alejandro Mosqueda Paz (born 20 January 1995), known professionally as Almighty, is a Cuban rapper. He released his single debut "Amárrate las Timber" in 2015. He is known for the Spanish version of Desiigner's song "Panda" in collaboration with Farruko. He has also collaborated with artists such as Bad Bunny, Jon Z, Wisin, among others.

Since 2019, Mosqueda has collaborated with Christian artists like Funky, Alex Zurdo, and Redimi2. His song "Filipenses 1:6" in collaboration with Redimi2 was awarded the "Best Urban/Christian Song" at the 2020 Tu Música Urbano Awards.

== Career ==
Born in Havana, Cuba on 20 January 1995, Mosqueda was raised there before moving to Carolina, Puerto Rico at the age of 6. He started producing songs during his teenage years, such as his "Alem el Pilar" and was subsequently signed to Lunatik Records, under which he released songs such as "Camino a la Fama" and "Ninguno Tiene el Flow". Mosqueda changed his name to "Almighty" since this pseudonym "combine[d] the initials of his name Alejandro Mosqueda", and because it seemed like a good commercial projection in the US market.

In 2015, Mosqueda met Luisito el Virus, who worked with Farruko. Farruko helped the 20-year-old Mosqueda sign a contract with his own record label, Carbon Fiber Music. After his debut song, he released several singles, such as the Spanish version of "Panda", which reached #36 on Hot Latin Songs and #23 on Latin Rhythm Airplay, "Aderall", "Panda" (remix), among others. In 2015- 2016, he surpassed rappers like Pusho, el Sica and Tempo, establishing himself within the urban genre. In 2017 after several rows with Lary Over, Mosqueda released a tirade called "RIP Carbon" directed by Farruko, Lary Over and Benny Benni.

Later, Mosqueda created his own record company, La Industria de los Inmortales, under which he recorded the song "Veo, Veo" with Elvis Crespo and singles such as "Ocho", "Asalto", among others. In 2017, he became part of the Sony Music Latin company, but parted the following year. Mosqueda appeared on the Billboard Hot Latin Songs at #20 with the collaborative song "Solita" by Hear This Music, along with Ozuna, Bad Bunny and Wisin.

Mosqueda released his debut album La Bestia under contract with Primo Boyz Music, which he performed in September 2019 at the Puerto Rico Convention Center. The album was on the Billboard Latin Rhythm Albums charts at #9 and on Top Latin Albums at #12. That year, after his conversion to Christianity, he released two Christian songs called "Hambre" and "Cristo Conmigo".

Mosqueda's first collaboration in the Christian sphere was with Redimi2 on "Filipenses 1:6", which was also nominated for Spanish Language Recorded Song of the Year at the 2020 Dove Awards. He revealed that he was stopped from receiving his prize at the stage for fear of what he might say. In 2019, he released his own version of Bryant Myers' song "Gan-Ga" titled "Arpa". The song was later removed from the YouTube platform.

In 2020, he began working on his first Christian album called Genelipsis, releasing songs like "Monigotes" and "Mi Testimonio". In 2021, he announced through an Instagram live that he was returning to secular music and explained the aftermath of his dissing Myke Towers. At the beginning of 2022, he announced the release date for his first Christian album, Genelipsis, on 20 January.

In March 2024, Mosqueda was reported missing by his mother and was eventually located safe and sound by agents in a wooded area of Vega Alta, Puerto Rico, as part of the search.

== Discography ==
- 2019: La Bestia
- 2022: Genelipsis
- 2024: Good Demon
- 2025: La Mitad del Mundo
