= Latin R&B =

Music genre originated in Puerto Rico & Latin America

- Stylistic origins: Contemporary R&B; Latin soul; dancehall
- Cultural origins: 2000s–2010s, Latin America and U.S.
- Typical instruments: Vocals; synthesizer; sampler; drum machine (Roland TR-808)

Latin R&B (also known as Spanish-language R&B) is a style of R&B that originated in Latin America and the United States. It is a musical subgenre of American contemporary R&B and Latin soul that also takes influence from dancehall. The genre began to gain popularity in the late 2010s and has since spread throughout Latin America.

== Characteristics ==
Vocals include a majority of singing and occasionally rapping, in Spanish. The lyrics in Latin R&B are often about sadness, heartbreak, and sex.

== History ==
Latin R&B can trace its roots to Latin pop songs with an American R&B and new jack swing influence, such as the Selena and Barrio Boyzz song "Donde Quiera Que Estés" released in 1994.

According to Rolling Stone, Spanish-language singles by Álex Rose, Rauw Alejandro and Paloma Mami, which borrow from R&B, reached a global audience. In Latin America, the genre became popular with Álex Rose's "Toda", Dalex's "Pa Mí" and "Cuaderno", and most notably Sech's "Otro Trago", which peaked in number one in Spain, Argentina, Colombia and Mexico. In the United States, "Otro Trago" reached the top of the Billboard Hot Latin Songs chart and peaked at No. 34 in the Hot 100.

== See also ==
- R&B
- Latin soul
