= Bryant Myers =

Puerto Rican rapper and singer

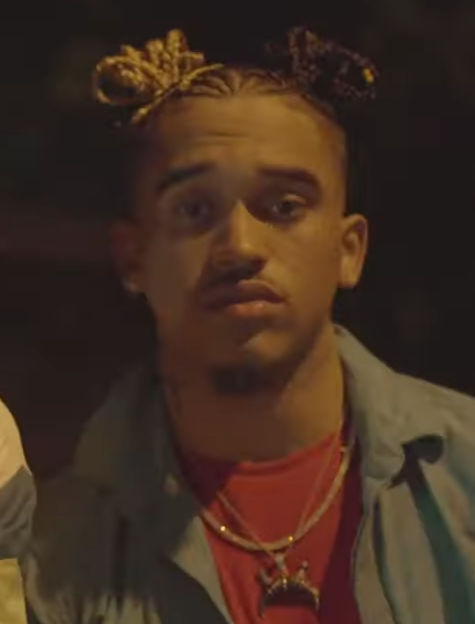
- Bryant Myers in 2017

Background information
- Born: Bryan Robert Rohena Pérez; April 5, 1998 (age 28); Carolina, Puerto Rico
- Genres: Latin trap; Latin R&B; reggaeton; drill
- Occupations: Rapper; singer; songwriter
- Instrument: Vocals
- Years active: 2015–present
- Labels: La Familia; Rimas

Bryan Robert Rohena Pérez (born April 5, 1998), known professionally as Bryant Myers, is a Puerto Rican rapper, singer and songwriter. Rohena was born in Loma Alta, Puerto Rico. He began sampling and making his own songs in 2013 and launched them on social media via his SoundCloud, Instagram and YouTube accounts. He is best known for his single "Esclava", which gained him popularity in his hometown.

His breakthrough came in 2016 with "Cuatro Babys", a song with Colombian rapper Maluma which featured Noriel and Juhn. The song became a commercial success, being certified 4× Platinum by the RIAA and peaking at number 15 on the Billboard Hot Latin Songs chart.

== Early life ==
Bryant Myers was born and grew up in a neighborhood called Loma Alta from Carolina, Puerto Rico, in what he describes as a hazardous environment (the alleys and streets). "Sometimes we did not have breakfast or lunch, my mom could not buy me some sneakers, that made me want to make a lot of money to have my family well, and that my mother and my brother did not miss anything", relates Bryant on an interview with Infobae. Bryant started writing songs in his home while he studied. He later left his studies in order to pursue his music career.

== Career ==
Bryant Myers' first hit "Esclava" put him on the radar with some well known reggaeton and urban artists, which allowed him to participate in a series of collaborations with charting artists. He followed it with "Esclava" (remix), featuring Anonimus (his cousin Luis Beauchamp), Anuel AA and Almighty. The latter track garnered over a million views on YouTube in less than three months. "Esclava" currently has 428 million views (as of May 16, 2024). Follow-up singles "Tu Me Enamoraste" and its remix with Lary Over and Brytiago, as well as "De Camino a Marte", performed just as well. He has continued to issue digital and video singles at a rate of at least one a month. In June 2016, he released "Vente Encima", featuring Anonimus, Noriel and Riko "El Bendecido", and guested on DJ Nelson's "Volverte a Ver" and Noriel's "La Llamada" (remix). In July 2016, he was a featured guest on Farruko's remix of his hit single "Ella y Yo" along with Almighty and Anuel AA, and "Esclava" was re-released as a digital download. His debut studio album, La Oscuridad, was released on July 27, 2018.

== Controversies ==
On February 12, 2016, while Myers was traveling through Puerto Rico in a van with his manager and singers, the police stopped the van for a traffic violation. When they inspected the vehicle, they found a firearm and 40 rounds of ammunition. At the time of the arrest, Myers was a minor, and spent a night in a juvenile prison.

On October 7, 2016, he featured on the song "Cuatro Babys" by Maluma featuring Noriel and Juhn. This song has been widely controversial over its lyrics as they arguably appear to suggest direct violence towards women. A petition was posted on Change.org demanding for the removal of the song from digital platforms. Despite this controversy, the popularity of "Cuatro Babys" has only risen with the song having gone quadruple Platinum. Because of this, Latin trap has had a large, but primarily underground, following.

On late September 2026, he filed a legal dispute against Rimas Entertainment (led by co-founder and CEO Noah Assad) over unfulfilled agreements, blocked releases and a "stolen artist". Myers accused Rimas of ignoring his long delayed trap album Trapero de Traperos, failing to honor agreed-upon payments (including a referenced multi-million dollar agreement), and refusing to schedule meetings or return calls. Myers publicly claimed that Noah Assad and Rimas took an artist he had been developing under his own imprint (Millo Gang), widely identified in urban media as the rising act Fronti. Fronti responded by denying that he was "stolen", stating that he fulfilled his contract and that Bryant Myers had an investment in him that was nearly recovered, while defending his decision to align with Rimas. Frustrated by feeling blocked from mainstream streaming platforms like Spotify due to label restrictions, Myers threatened to leak or pirate his own album independently and set up alternative fan meet-and-greets to perform the music. Noah Assad and Rimas Entertainment have not issued a formal corporate statement addressing Myers' claims.

On October 23, 2026, he was accused of going 113 mph, fleeing deputies in DeSoto County.

== Discography ==
- La Oscuridad (2018)
- Bendecido (2020)
- KR & Bryant MA (with Kevin Roldán) (2023)
