= Latin trap =

Music genre originating in Puerto Rico

- Stylistic origins: Trap; Southern hip hop; reggaeton; Urbano music
- Cultural origins: 2000s–2010s, in Puerto Rico
- Typical instruments: Vocals; synthesizer; sampler; drum machine (Roland TR-808)

Fusion genres
- Trapeton

Regional scenes
- Latin America; United States; Puerto Rico; Spain

Latin trap is a subgenre of Latin hip hop music that originated in Puerto Rico. A direct descendant of southern hip hop and trap, and influenced by reggaeton, R&B and urbano music. Vocals are often performed using a rap-singing technique. it gained popularity after 2007, and has since spread throughout Latin America. The trap is slang for a place where drugs are sold. Latin trap is similar to US American trap with lyrics about life on la calle (the street), drugs, sex and violence.

== Characteristics ==
Latin trap is a subgenre of Latin hip hop, generally taking influence from Southern hip hop, Hip-Hop in general, and possibly influenced by SoundCloud rap as well as already established Puerto Rican genres like reggaeton. Vocals include a bend of rapping and singing using synthesizers and autotune in Spanish or in Spanglish, while still maintaining the trap style sonic circuitry. The lyrics in Latin trap are often about street life, violence, sex, drugs, and people who pride themselves in living on the other side of the law.

== History ==
=== 2000s ===
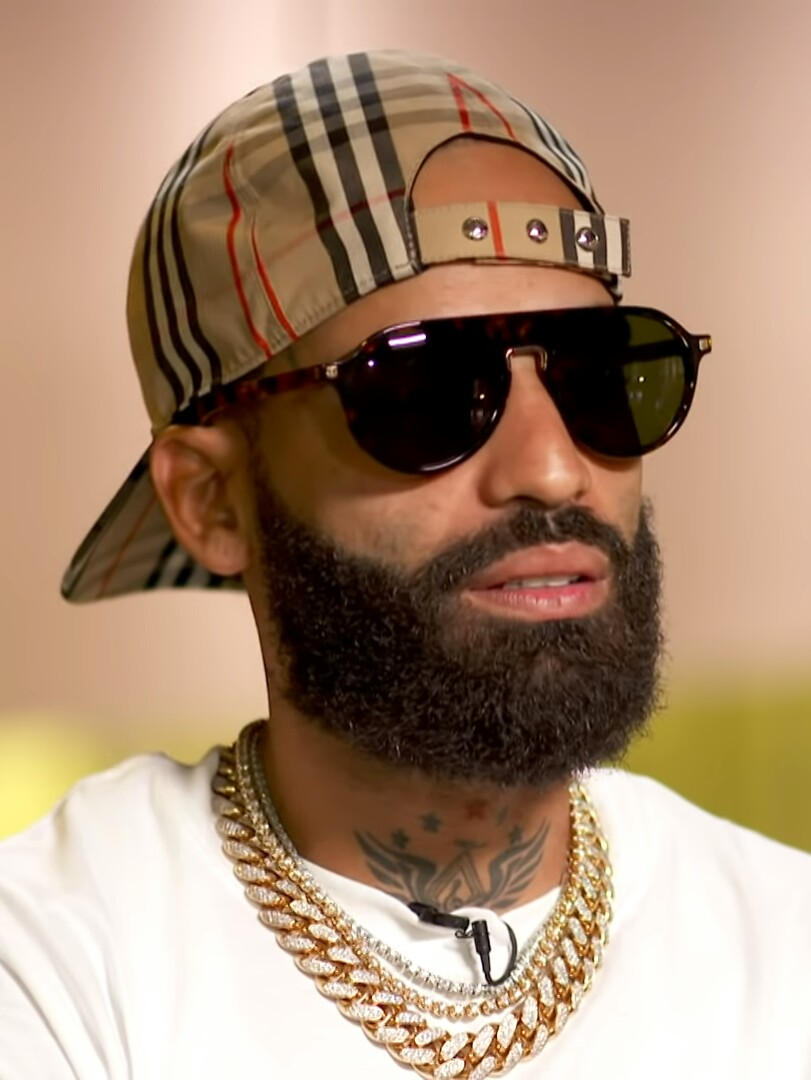
Arcángel is considered a pioneer of Latin trap.

Latin trap originated in Puerto Rico and gained popularity throughout Latin America. The exact date of origin is unknown and has been widely debated. Puerto Rican reggaeton and Latin trap singer Ozuna states that it originated in 2007 with the song "El Pistolón", performed by Arcángel & De la Ghetto, Yaga & Mackie, and Jowell & Randy (the former two were duo at the time). De la Ghetto on the other hand, states that he has been performing Latin trap since around 2005 or 2006, and that people thought "he was crazy". Reggaeton artists at this time wanted to introduce elements of American hip hop and R&B to a Spanish audience.

=== 2010s ===
Latin trap began to gain prominence around 2014 when artists such as Alvaro Diaz, Myke Towers and Fuete Billete, the first Puerto Rican artists using early Latin trap beats to rap, began posting their songs through social media platforms. In mid-2015, Cuban artist TRAUMATIZE from Miami, FL releases "Aguadulce" Latin trap record, a collaborator of the American Hip Hop group Bone Thugs-n-Harmony. This new sound eventually gained popularity in Puerto Rico, and many Latin trap hits emerged, such as Anuel AA’s "47 Remix" Bryant Myers' "Esclava Remix", Farruko's "Ella y Yo", and De la Ghetto's "La Ocasión", the latter to which Ozuna and Anuel AA credits with expanding Latin trap internationally.

A Spanish version of "Panda" was released by Almighty on the Miami-based label Carbon Fiber Music. The single reached #36 on Hot Latin Songs and #23 on Latin Rhythm Airplay. Borrowing the original version's beat, it features Farruko, owner of said label, while a subsequent remix adds Daddy Yankee and Cosculluela. Additionally, Anuel AA released a scathing diss track towards Almighty, entitled "RIP Panda", after being taken down from the remix.

In July 2017, The Fader wrote: "Rappers and reggaetoneros from Puerto Rico have taken elements of trap – the lurching bass lines, jittering 808s and the eyes-half-closed vibe – and infused them into banger after banger." In an August 2017 article for Billboard's series, "A Brief History Of", they enlisted some of the key artists of Latin trap, including Ozuna, De la Ghetto, Bad Bunny, Farruko and Messiah- to narrate a brief history on the genre. Elias Leight of Rolling Stone noted: "[Jorge] Fonseca featured Puerto Rican artists like Anuel AA, Bryant Myers and Noriel on the compilation Trap Capos: Season 1, which became the first "Latin trap" LP to reach number one on Billboard's Latin Rhythm Albums chart."

Many other reggaeton and Latin trap artists contributed to the popularity of Latin trap, such as Bad Bunny who led an explosion to the popularity of the genre. Bad Bunny produced several songs that made it into Billboard's Hot Latin Songs chart and has multiple collaborations with popular American artists such as Nicki Minaj, Travis Scott, and Cardi B. He shortly became the face of Latin trap's sudden rise in popularity. Through collaborations with other artists, such as his appearance in Becky G's "Mayores", Bad Bunny was among the first Latin trap artists to ever rap on the radio. His appearance on the radio has led to an increased recognition of Latin trap in the United States. His debut album X 100pre was released in December 2018 and was awarded with a Latin Grammy for Best Urban Music Album.

In April 2018, the song "Te Boté", a mix of Latin trap and reggaeton, was released by Nio García, Casper Mágico, Darell, Ozuna, Bad Bunny and Nicky Jam. It became the first song with Latin trap elements in it to reach number one on the Billboard Hot Latin Songs chart. It currently has over 2 billion views on YouTube.

In 2018, Cardi B's hit single "I Like It" featuring Bad Bunny and J Balvin became the first Latin trap song to reach number one on the US Billboard Hot 100 chart.

=== 2020s: Current ===
J Balvin and Bad Bunny appear at the 2020 Super Bowl Halftime Show performing Latin trap songs for the first time in history.

Bad Bunny is the most influential Latin trap artist being named one of Time’s 100 Most Influential People of 2021. Bad Bunny is currently at his peak being named Spotify's most streamed artist of 2021 and 2022. On May 6, 2022 Bad Bunny released his album Un Verano Sin Ti reaching the milestone of most-streamed artist globally in one day, with 183 million streams. In 2023, Bad Bunny released his album, Nadie Sabe Lo Que Va a Pasar Mañana, which was considered one of his first true Latin trap albums since 2020.

Young Miko is emerging onto the Latin trap scene due to her album Trap Kitty in 2022. She has landed two major collaborations with Bad Bunny and Feid, which were Hot 100 hits.

== See also ==
- List of Latin trap musicians
