= Asesina =

Asesina may refer to:

- "Asesina" (Lali Espósito song), 2013 song by Lali Esposito from the album A Bailar
- "Asesina" (Brytiago and Darell song), 2018 song by Brytiago and Darell
- "Asesina", 1986 song by Bonny Cepeda
