= 2020 Billboard Latin Music Awards =

Annual American music awards ceremony

27th Billboard Latin Music Awards
- Date: October 21, 2020
- Site: BB&T Center, Sunrise, Florida, U.S.
- Hosted by: Gaby Espino

Highlights
- Most awards: Bad Bunny and Daddy Yankee (7 each)
- Most nominations: Bad Bunny and Ozuna (14 each)

Television coverage
- Network: Telemundo; TNT Latin America
- Duration: 2 hours
- Ratings: 3.5 million

The 27th Billboard Latin Music Awards ceremony, presented by Billboard magazine, honored the best performing Latin recordings, charting from February 2, 2019, to January 25, 2020. The ceremony was held on October 21, 2020, at the BB&T Center in Sunrise, in the periphery of Miami. The ceremony was televised in the United States by Telemundo for the 22nd time. The Billboard Latin Music Awards closed out LatinFest+, presented by Billboard and Telemundo, a three-day immersive experience dedicated to Latin music, culture and entertainment. Celebrating its 30th anniversary, the formerly known as Billboard Latin Music Week, included virtual superstar conversations and workshops with, among others, Ozuna, Rosalía, Maluma, Black Eyed Peas, Carlos Vives and Los Tigres del Norte between October 20 and 23. The awards recognize the most popular Latin performers, songs, albums, labels, songwriters and producers in the United States. Recipients are based on sales, radio airplay, online streaming and social data during a one-year period.

== Background ==
Despite many producers being in talks to hold the gala at the Fibes Auditorium in Seville in May following the success of the MTV Europe Music Awards and the excitement of many artists to play there, on February 5, 2020, Billboard announced the nominations for the award ceremony and revealed that it would take place on April 23 at Mandalay Bay Events Center in Las Vegas while LatinFest + was scheduled to be held at The Venetian featuring speeches, debates and live performances. On March 17, Billboard agreed to postpone the gala following the Nevada Governor's recommendations to limit the size of public gatherings for the prevention and containment of COVID-19 in the United States.

On August 24, Billboard announced that the Latin Music Awards would be taking place in Miami on October 21. Nominations were not changed.

== Performers ==
Artist(s)	Song(s)
Maluma	"Hawai"
Jesse & Joy	"Love (Es Nuestro Idioma)"
Reik & Jessie Reyez	"Lo Intenté Todo"
Pitbull, Chesca & Frankie Valli vs Wisin & Yandel Ft. El Alfa	"Te Quiero Baby (I Love You Baby)" "Moviendolo (Remix)"
Gente De Zona & Gerardo Ortiz	"Otra Botella"
Luis Fonsi & Farruko	"Perfecta"
Carlos Vives	"Cumbiana" "La Bicicleta" "La Gota Fría" “Pa’ Mayté”
Banda MS de Sergio Lizarraga & Snoop Dogg	"Qué Maldición"
Wisin & Myke Towers	"Mi Niña"
Nío Garcia & Casper Mágico	"La Gangster"
Ozuna, Black Eyed Peas & J. Rey Soul	"Despeinada" "Mamacita"
Armando Manzanero	"Contigo Aprendí" (with Pablo Alborán) "Por Debajo de la Mesa" (with Luis Fonsi) "No Sé Tu" (with Joy) "Como Yo Te Amé" (with Jesús Navarro) "Esta Tarde Vi Llover"
Sech	"Relacion"
Pablo Alborán	"Si Hubieras Querido"
Raymix & Paulina Rubio	"Tú y Yo"
Ozuna	"Gracias"
Farruko Ft. Myke Towers, Sech, Jay Wheeler & Tempo	"La Toxica (Remix)"
Daddy Yankee Ft. Anuel AA, Kendo Kaponi & Sisqó	"Don Don (Remix)"
Manuel Turizo, Rauw Alejandro & Myke Towers	"La Nota"

== Nominees ==
The nominees for the 27th Billboard Latin Music Awards were announced on February 5, 2020. Ozuna and Bad Bunny led the nominations with 14 each. Daddy Yankee and J Balvin both received 12 nominations; Anuel AA received 11; and Farruko 10.

Complete list of nominees.

=== Awards ===
Artist of the Year	New Artist of the Year
Bad Bunny; J Balvin; Ozuna; Romeo Santos	Sech; Jhay Cortez; Manuel Turizo; Paulo Londra
Tour of the Year	Social Artist of the Year
It's My Party - Jennifer Lopez; X100pre Tour - Bad Bunny; Desde el Alma Tour - Chayanne; Opus Tour - Marc Anthony	Lali; Anuel AA; Becky G; Daddy Yankee
Crossover Artist of the Year	Hot Latin Song of the Year
Katy Perry; DJ Snake; Drake; Snow	Daddy Yankee feat. Snow – Con Calma; Bad Bunny feat. Tainy – Callaíta; Pedro Capó feat. Farruko – Calma (Remix); Sech feat. Darell, Nicky Jam, Ozuna & Anuel AA – Otro Trago (Remix)
Vocal Event Hot Latin Song of the Year	Male Hot Latin Songs Artist of the Year
Daddy Yankee feat. Snow – Con Calma; Bad Bunny feat. Tainy – Callaíta; Pedro Capó feat. Farruko – Calma (Remix); Sech feat. Darell, Nicky Jam, Ozuna & Anuel AA – Otro Trago (Remix)	Bad Bunny; Anuel AA; J Balvin; Ozuna
Female Hot Latin Songs Artist of the Year	Duo/Group Hot Latin Songs Artist of the Year
Karol G; Becky G; Natti Natasha; Rosalía	Calibre 50; Banda los Sebastianes de Mazatlán, Sinaloa; Banda Sinaloense MS de Sergio Lizárraga; Wisin & Yandel
Hot Latin Songs Label of the Year	Hot Latin Songs Imprint of the Year
Universal Music Latin Entertainment; Interscope; RIMAS; Sony Music Latin	Universal Music Latino; El Cartel; RIMAS; Sony Music Latin
Airplay Song of the Year	Airplay Label of the Year
Daddy Yankee feat. Snow – Con Calma; Anuel AA feat. Daddy Yankee, Karol G, Ozuna & J Balvin – China; Ozuna feat. Daddy Yankee, J Balvin, Farruko & Anuel AA – Baila Baila Baila (Remix); Pedro Capó feat. Farruko – Calma (Remix)	Universal Music Latino; El Cartel; Lizos; Sony Music Latin
Airplay Imprint of the Year	Digital Song of the Year
Universal Music Latino; El Cartel; Fonovisa; Sony Music Latin	Daddy Yankee feat. Snow – Con Calma; Bad Bunny feat. Tainy – Callaíta; Ozuna feat. Daddy Yankee, J Balvin, Farruko & Anuel AA – Baila Baila Baila (Remix); Pedro Capó feat. Farruko – Calma (Remix)
Streaming Song of the Year	Top Latin Album of the Year
Daddy Yankee feat. Snow – Con Calma; Anuel AA feat. Romeo Santos – Ella Quiere Beber (Remix); Pedro Capó feat. Farruko – Calma; Sech feat. Darell, Nicky Jam, Ozuna & Anuel AA – Otro Trago (Remix)	Bad Bunny – X 100PRE; J Balvin & Bad Bunny – OASIS; Luis Fonsi – Vida; Sech – Sueños
Male Top Latin Albums Artist of the Year	Female Top Latin Albums Artist of the Year
Bad Bunny; J Balvin; Ozuna; Romeo Santos	Karol G; Becky G; Natti Natasha; Shakira
Duo/Group Top Latin Albums Artist of the Year	Top Latin Albums Label of the Year
Banda Sinaloense MS de Sergio Lizárraga; Aventura; Santana; T3r Elemento	Sony Music Latin; Rich; RIMAS; Universal Music Latin Entertainment
Top Latin Albums Imprint of the Year	Latin Pop Song of the Year
Sony Music Latin; Rich; RIMAS; Universal Music Latin Entertainment	Pedro Capó feat. Farruko – Calma (Remix); Luis Fonsi feat. Sebastián Yatra & Nicky Jam – Date La Vuelta; Rosalía feat. Ozuna – Yo x Ti, Tu x Mi; Rosalía feat. J Balvin & El Guincho – Con Altura
Latin Pop Artist of the Year	Latin Pop Duo/Group of the Year
Luis Fonsi; Enrique Iglesias; Sebastián Yatra; Shakira	Maná; CNCO; Reik; Santana
Latin Pop Airplay Label of the Year	Latin Pop Airplay Imprint of the Year
Sony Music Latin; El Cartel; Universal Music Latin Entertainment; Warner Latina	Universal Music Latin Entertainment; El Cartel; Sony Music Latin; Warner Latina
Latin Pop Album of the Year	Latin Pop Albums Label of the Year
Luis Fonsi – Vida; Danny Ocean – 54+1; Mau y Ricky – Para Aventuras y Curiosidades; Santana – Africa Speaks	Universal Music Latin Entertainment; Concord; Sony Music Latin; Warner Latina
Latin Pop Albums Imprint of the Year	Tropical Song of the Year
Universal Music Latin Entertainment; Capitol Latin; Sony Music Latin; Warner Latina	Wisin & Yandel feat. Romeo Santos – Aullando; Aventura – Inmortal; Marc Anthony – Parecen Viernes; Silvestre Dangond feat. Maluma – Vivir Bailando
Tropical Artist of the Year	Tropical Duo/Group of the Year
Romeo Santos; Juan Luis Guerra; Marc Anthony; Prince Royce	Aventura; Gente de Zona; La Sonora Dinamita; Monchy y Alexandra
Tropical Songs Airplay Label of the Year	Tropical Songs Airplay Imprint of the Year
Sony Music Latin; Pina; RIMAS; Universal Music Latin Entertainment	Sony Music Latin; Pina; Universal Music Latino; WK
Tropical Album of the Year	Tropical Albums Label of the Year
Romeo Santos – Utopía; Gilberto Santa Rosa – 40... Y Contando: En Vivo Desde Puerto Rico; Marc Anthony – OPUS; Victor Manuelle – Memorias de Navidad	Sony Music Latin; Discos Fuentes; The Orchard; Universal Music Latin Entertainment
Tropical Albums Imprint of the Year	Regional Mexican Song of the Year
Sony Music Latin; Norte; The Orchard; Top Stop	Los Ángeles Azules feat. Natalia Lafourcade – Nunca Es Suficiente; Banda Los Sebastianes de Mazatlán, Sinaloa – A Través del Vaso; Calibre 50 – Simplemente Gracias; Christian Nodal – De Los Besos Que Te Di
Regional Mexican Artist of the Year	Regional Mexican Duo/Artist of the Year
Christian Nodal; El Fantasma; Lenin Ramírez; Raymix	Banda Sinaloense MS de Sergio Lizárraga; Calibre 50; Los Ángeles Azules; T3r Elemento
Regional Mexican Airplay Label of the Year	Regional Mexican Airplay Imprint of the Year
Universal Music Latin Entertainment; DEL; Lizos; Sony Music Latin	Fonovisa; Andaluz; Disa; Lizos
Regional Mexican Album of the Year	Regional Mexican Albums Label of the Year
Fuerza Regida – Del Barrio Hasta Aquí; Christian Nodal – Ahora; Herencia de Patrones – Pa Las Vibras; Los Ángeles Azules – Esto Sí Es Cumbia	Universal Music Latin Entertainment; DEL; Rancho Humilde; Sony Music Latin
Regional Mexican Albums Imprint of the Year	Latin Rhythm Song of the Year
DEL; Fonovisa; Lizos; Lumbre	Daddy Yankee feat. Snow – Con Calma; Bad Bunny feat. Tainy – Callaíta; Ozuna feat. Daddy Yankee, J Balvin, Farruko & Anuel AA – Baila Baila Baila (Remix); Sech feat. Darell, Nicky Jam, Ozuna & Anuel AA – Otro Trago (Remix)
Latin Rhythm Artist of the Year	Latin Rhythm Duo/Group of the Year
Bad Bunny; J Balvin; Maluma; Ozuna	Wisin & Yandel; CNCO; Jowell & Randy; Zion & Lennox
Latin Rhythm Airplay Label of the Year	Latin Rhythm Airplay Imprint of the Year
Sony Music Latin; El Cartel; RIMAS; Universal Music Latin Entertainment	Universal Music Latino; El Cartel; La Industria; WK
Latin Rhythm Album of the Year	Latin Rhythm Albums Label of the Year
Bad Bunny – X 100PRE; Farruko – Gangalee; J Balvin feat. Bad Bunny – OASIS; Sech – Sueños	Sony Music Latin; Rich; Rimas; Universal Music Latin Entertainment
Latin Rhythm Albums Imprint of the Year	Songwriter of the Year
Universal Music Latino; Dimelo Vi LLC; Rimas; Sony Music Latin	Bad Bunny; Daddy Yankee; J Balvin; Ozuna
Publisher of the Year	Publishing Corporation of the Year
WC Music Corp., ASCAP; Songs of Kobalt Music Publishing America, INC., BMI; Sony/ATV Discos Publishing LLC, ASCAP; Universal Musica Unica Publishing, BMI	Sony/ATV Music; Kobalt Music; Universal Music; Warner/Chappell Music
Producer of the Year	Latin Song of the Decade
Tainy; Dimelo Flow; DJ Snake; Mambo Kingz	Luis Fonsi feat. Daddy Yankee & Justin Bieber – Despacito
