= Te Va Bien =

2021 single by Kevvo, Arcángel and Becky G

Single by Kevvo, Arcángel and Becky G featuring Darell

from the album Cotidiano
- Released: March 4, 2021
- Length: 4:42
- Label: Interscope
- Songwriters: Kevin Manuel Rivera; Pedro J. Figueroa Quintana; Osval E. Castro Hernandez; Elena Rose; Rebbeca Gomez; Austin Agustin Santos; Cristian Jose Restrepo Herrera
- Producer: Nobeat

Kevvo singles chronology
"Preseo" (2021)	"Te Va Bien" (2021)	"Rutina" (2021)

Arcángel singles chronology
"La Boca" (2021)	"Te Va Bien" (2021)	"Te Acuerdas" (2021)

Becky G singles chronology
"No Drama" (2020)	"Te Va Bien" (2021)	"Down To Miami" (2021)

Darell singles chronology
"Baja" (2021)	"Te Va Bien" (2021)	"Vai Vendo" (2021)

Music video
- "Te Va Bien" on YouTube

"Te Va Bien" is a song by Puerto Rican rapper Kevvo, American singers Arcángel and Becky G featuring Puerto Rican rapper Darell. It was released by Interscope on March 4, 2021, as the lead single from Kevvo debut album, Cotidiano (2021).

== Music video ==
The music video was released alongside the song on March 4, 2021. The music video was directed by both.

== Charts ==
Chart (2021)	Peak position
US Latin Digital Song Sales (Billboard)	25

== Certifications ==
Region	Certification	Certified units/sales
United States (RIAA)	Platinum (Latin)	60,000^{‡}
^{‡} Sales+streaming figures based on certification alone.
