= Sueños (Sech album) =

Studio album by Sech
- Released: April 19, 2019
- Genres: Reggaeton; Latin pop
- Length: 41:08
- Label: Rich Music
- Producers: Dimelo Flow; Rike Music; The Rudeboyz; Jhon El Diver; Mista Bombo; Simon; Slow Mike; BF Jeezy

Sech chronology
Sueños (2019)	1 of 1 (2020)

Singles from Sueños
- 1. "Solita" Released: February 28, 2019

Sueños (English: Dreams) is the debut album by Panamanian singer Sech, released on April 19, 2019, through Rich Music. The album was produced by Dimelo Flow, Rike Music, The Rudeboyz, Jhon El Diver, Mista Bombo, Simon, Slow Mike and BF Jeezy, and features collaborations with Darell, Manuel Turizo, Farruko, Zion & Lennox, Justin Quiles, Nicky Jam, Lenny Tavárez, De La Ghetto and Dimelo Flow.

At the 20th Annual Latin Grammy Awards, the album was nominated for Best Urban Music Album while the song "Otro Trago" received nominations for Best Urban Fusion/Performance and Best Urban Song. The album also received nominations for Top Latin Album of the Year and Latin Rhythm Album of the Year at the 2020 Billboard Latin Music Awards and Top Latin Album at the 2020 Billboard Music Awards.

The album peaked at number 81 and 3 at the Billboard 200 and Top Latin Albums charts, respectively, it also peaked at number 41 on the Independent Albums chart.

== Background ==
From 2014 and 2017 Sech released several songs independently including "Miss Lonely" in 2017 (later included in the album), produced by Dimelo Flow, who would eventually produce the album, the song was successful in Panama, the country of origin of Sech, and led him to be signed by independent label Rich Music in 2018. In 2019 he released his debut studio album Sueños on April 19, 2019, being followed by "Otro Trago", a "piano-reggaeton ballad about drinking and dancing the heartbreak away", the song was highly commercially successful and made Sech a "breakout star" within the reggaeton music scene, Sech has said about the song that "it's the song that truly changed my life".

== Singles ==
On February 28, 2019, "Solita" was released as the album's first single, the song features Puerto Rican singers Farruko and Zion & Lennox. The second single was "Otro Trago" featuring rapper Darell on April 26, 2019. A remix of the song was released on July 26, 2019, with Nicky Jam, Ozuna and Anuel AA. The song and its remix were very commercially successful, being Sech's most successful song, topping the charts in several country including Argentina, Spain and Panama, and reaching number 34 on the Billboard Hot 100 chart, as well as also peaking at number one on the Hot Latin Songs, Latin Airplay and Latin Rhythm Airplay charts, all three by Billboard.

== Critical reception ==
American magazine Rolling Stone included the album in their list of Best Latin Albums of 2019, placing it at number 3, calling Sech "the most exceptional new Spanish-language artist of 2019", commenting on his success writing that "with so much in place to obstruct difference, it takes a lot for an Afro-Panamanian R&B singer to ascend to Billboard chart heights domestically and streaming services globally", they also highlighted the tracks "Boomerang" and "Falsas Promesas" as songs that made the album a must-listen.

=== Accolades ===
Accolades for Sueños
Publication	Accolade	Rank
Rolling Stone	Best Latin Album of 2019	3

== Awards and nominations ==
Award	Year	Recipient(s) and nominee(s)	Category	Result	Ref.
Billboard Music Awards	2020	"Otro Trago (Remix)" (with Darell, Nicky Jam, Ozuna, Anuel AA)	Top Latin Song	Nominated	
Billboard Music Awards	2020	Sueños	Top Latin Album	Nominated	
Billboard Latin Music Awards	2020	"Otro Trago (Remix)" (with Darell, Nicky Jam, Ozuna, Anuel AA)	Hot Latin Song of the Year	Nominated	
Billboard Latin Music Awards	2020	"Otro Trago (Remix)" (with Darell, Nicky Jam, Ozuna, Anuel AA)	Vocal Event Hot Latin Song of the Year	Nominated	
Billboard Latin Music Awards	2020	"Otro Trago (Remix)" (with Darell, Nicky Jam, Ozuna, Anuel AA)	Streaming Song of the Year	Nominated	
Billboard Latin Music Awards	2020	"Otro Trago (Remix)" (with Darell, Nicky Jam, Ozuna, Anuel AA)	Latin Rhythm Song of the Year	Nominated	
Billboard Latin Music Awards	2020	Sueños	Top Latin Album of the Year	Nominated	
Billboard Latin Music Awards	2020	Sueños	Latin Rhythm Album of the Year	Nominated	
Latin Grammy Awards	2019	"Otro Trago" (with Darell)	Best Urban Fusion/Performance	Nominated	
Latin Grammy Awards	2019	"Otro Trago" (with Darell)	Best Urban Song	Nominated	
Latin Grammy Awards	2019	Sueños	Best Urban Music Album	Nominated	
Premios Lo Nuestro	2020	"Otro Trago (Remix)" (with Darell, Nicky Jam, Ozuna, Anuel AA)	Remix of the Year	Nominated	
Premios Tu Música Urbano	2020	"Otro Trago" (with Darell)	Song of the Year	Nominated	
Premios Tu Música Urbano	2020	"Otro Trago" (with Darell)	Song of the Year - New Generation	Won	
Premios Tu Música Urbano	2020	"Otro Trago (Remix)" (with Darell, Nicky Jam, Ozuna, Anuel AA)	Remix of the Year	Nominated	
Premios Tu Música Urbano	2020	Sueños	Album of the Year - New Generation	Nominated	

== Track listing ==
Sueños track listing
No.	Title	Writer(s)	Producer(s)	Length
1.	"Soñando Despierto"	Carlos Isaias Morales Williams; Jorge Váldes; Joshua Mendez; Manuel Enrique Cortes	Dímelo Flow; Rike Music	2:15
2.	"Falsas Promesas"	Morales Williams; Váldes; Mendez; Bryan Lezcano Chaverra; Kevin Mauricio Jiménez Londoño; Kevyn Cruz	Dimelo Flow; The Rudeboyz	3:26
3.	"Otro Trago" (featuring Darell)	Morales Williams; Váldes; Mendez; Darell Castro	Dimelo Flow	3:45
4.	"La Niña"	Morales Williams; Váldes; Mendez; Manuel Enrique Cortes	Dímelo Flow; Rike Music	2:43
5.	"Tiene Novio" (featuring Manuel Turizo)	Morales Williams; Váldes; Mendez; Cortes; Jhonattan Jacob Reyes Cedeño; Manuel Turizo	Dímelo Flow; Rike Music; Jhon El Diver	3:40
6.	"X Ti"	Morales Williams; Váldes; Mendez; Cortes; Simon Restrepo	Dímelo Flow; Rike Music; Simon	2:53
7.	"Solita" (featuring Farruko and Zion & Lennox)	Morales Williams; Váldes; Mendez; Cortes; Reyes Cedeño; Carlos Efrén Reyes Rosado; Felix Ortiz; Gabriel Pizarro; Jonathan Emmanuel Tobar	Dímelo Flow; Rike Music; Jhon El Diver; Mista Bombo	3:39
8.	"Boomerang"	Morales Williams; Váldes; Mendez; Restrepo; Miguel Martinez	Dímelo Flow; Simon; Slow Mike	3:23
9.	"Que Más Pues - Remix" (featuring Justin Quiles, Maluma, Nicky Jam, Farruko, Dalex and Lenny Tavárez)	Morales Williams; Váldes; Mendez; Cortes; Reyes Cedeño; Reyes Rosado; Justin Quiles; Juan Luis Londoño Arias; Nick Rivera Caminero; Pedro David Daleccio	Dímelo Flow; Rike Music; Jhon El Diver	5:05
10.	"La Discusión"	Morales Williams; Váldes; Mendez; Cortes; Reyes Cedeño	Dímelo Flow; Rike Music; Jhon El Diver	3:05
11.	"Miss Lonely - Dimelo Flow Remix" (featuring Justin Quiles, De La Ghetto and Dimelo Flow)	Morales Williams; Váldes; Mendez; Reyes Cedeño; Tobar; Quiles; Pablo Christian Fuentes; Rafael Castillo	Dímelo Flow; Mista Bombo; BF Jeezy; Jhon El Diver	4:00
12.	"Lo Malo"	Morales Williams; Váldes; Mendez; Cortes	Dímelo Flow; Rike Music	3:08
Total length:				41:08

== Charts ==
Weekly chart performance for Sueños
Chart (2019)	Peak position
US Billboard 200	81
US Independent Albums (Billboard)	41
US Top Latin Albums (Billboard)	3
US Latin Rhythm Albums (Billboard)	3

=== Year-end charts ===
Year-end chart performance for Sueños
Chart (2019)	Position
US Top Latin Albums (Billboard)	9

Year-end chart performance for Sueños
Chart (2020)	Position
US Top Latin Albums (Billboard)	20

Year-end chart performance for Sueños
Chart (2021)	Position
US Top Latin Albums (Billboard)	77

== Certifications ==
Certifications for Sueños
Region	Certification	Certified units/sales
United States (RIAA)	4× Platinum (Latin)	240,000^{‡}
^{‡} Sales+streaming figures based on certification alone.
