= Diles (song) =

2016 single by Bad Bunny

Single by Bad Bunny, Ozuna and Farruko featuring Arcángel and Ñengo Flow
- Language: Spanish
- English title: "Tell Them"
- Released: August 26, 2016
- Genre: Latin trap; Latin R&B
- Length: 4:50
- Label: Hear This Music; Rimas
- Songwriters: Benito Martínez; Juan Ozuna; Carlos Reyes; Austin Santos; Edwin Rosa; Luian Malavé
- Producers: Bad Bunny; DJ Luian; La Paciencia; Mambo Kingz

Bad Bunny singles chronology
"Otra Vez" (2016)	"Diles" (2016)	"Tú No Vive' Así" (2016)

Lyric video
- "Diles" on YouTube

"Diles" (transl. "Tell Them") is a song by Puerto Rican rapper Bad Bunny, released on January 25, 2016 on SoundCloud. The song is credited for Bad Bunny's rise in prominence in the Latin trap scene. After the song caught the attention of DJ Luian, who subsequently signed Bad Bunny to his record label, Hear This Music, a remix with Ozuna and Farruko featuring Arcángel and Ñengo Flow was released on August 26, 2016, through Hear This Music and Rimas Entertainment.

== Background and release ==
While working as a bagger at a supermarket in Vega Baja, Bad Bunny released music as an independent artist, where he released the original solo version of "Diles" on SoundCloud. His song eventually caught the attention of DJ Luian who signed him to his record label, Hear This Music.

Although an official music video was never planned or released, its accompanying lyric video, which was uploaded to YouTube on August 25, 2016, has amassed over 1 billion views as of 2023.

== Charts ==
2017 chart performance for "Diles"
Chart (2017)	Peak position
Spain (Promusicae)	85

2026 chart performance for "Diles"
Chart (2026)	Peak position
Argentina Hot 100 (Billboard)	43
Bolivia (Billboard)	19
Colombia Hot 100 (Billboard)	40
Ecuador (Billboard)	18
Global 200 (Billboard)	105
Peru (Billboard)	14
Spain (Promusicae)	53

== Certifications ==
Certifications and sales for "Diles" (Remix)
Region	Certification	Certified units/sales
Spain (Promusicae)	4× Platinum	400,000^{‡}
United States (RIAA)	4× Platinum (Latin)	240,000^{‡}
^{‡} Sales+streaming figures based on certification alone.

== Release history ==
Release dates and formats for "Diles"
Region	Date	Format	Version	Label(s)	Ref.
Various	January 25, 2016	Digital download; streaming	Solo version	—	
Various	August 26, 2016	Digital download; streaming	Remix version	Hear This Music; Rimas	
