= Kevvo =

Puerto Rican singer and rapper

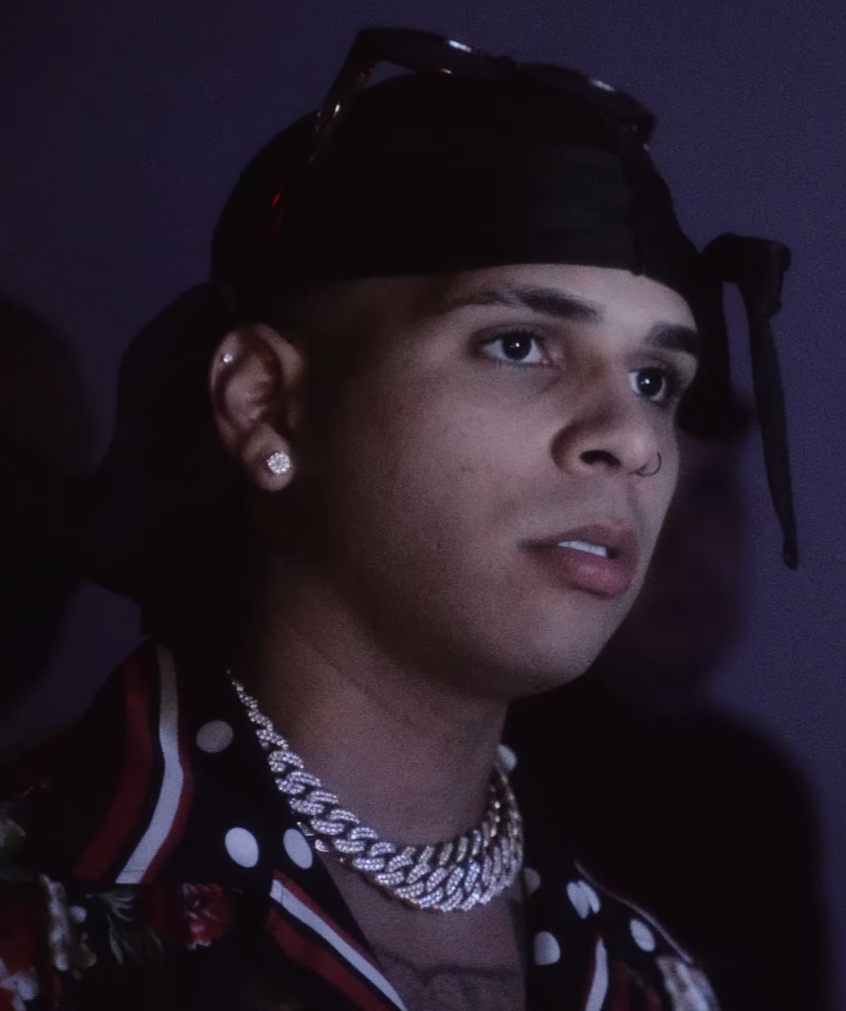
- Kevvo in 2021

Background information
- Born: Kevin Manuel Rivera Allende; February 10, 1998 (age 28); Toa Baja, Puerto Rico
- Genres: Reggaeton; Latin trap
- Occupations: Singer; rapper; songwriter
- Years active: 2019–present
- Labels: Una Visión Quintana; Interscope

Kevin Manuel Rivera Allende (born February 10, 1998), known by his stage name Kevvo (stylized in all caps), is a Puerto Rican singer and rapper.

He first came to prominence with his song "105F", which included a remix with Ñengo Flow, Myke Towers, Darell, Chencho Corleone, Arcángel and Farruko. The video surpassed 50 million views on YouTube one month after its release.

== Origins ==
He said that some of his inspirations were Cosculluela, Daddy Yankee, Arcángel, Ñengo Flow, and Farruko, because he grew up hearing their music.

Kevvo said in Spanish talking about his origins:

I started producing from my house, from my room. I started with a basic program, like everyone. Since I was 8 I was doing rhythms as a hobby. I didn't do it for people to know me. It was simply that I liked it.

== Controversies ==
In 2019, he had a diss battle with fellow Puerto Rican rapper Omy de Oro. Kevvo said in the Ecoween event in Eco Sports Park, "Subimos de rango un carajo", making reference of one of Omy's songs, which made him angry. Omy came to Kevvo, hit him in the face and got this sunglasses. Both artists were accompanied with bodyguards from their shows for safety reasons.

In another incident, this time in 2020, one of his songs was leaked that contained material that some considered to be dissing fellow Puerto Rican rappers Eladio Carrión and Ozuna, but that was later proven false. The controversy came when he made a statement in a line saying "Tocame y te dejo flow Prichard Colón, jodio." People were offended by that line due to a dilemma the boxer faced when an illegal puch to the back of the head caused him a cerebral hemorrhage, he later fell in coma for almost a year, and now he is healing although he is still in a vegatative state. Kevvo later apologized for the comment.

== Discography ==
=== Studio albums ===
- 2021: Cotidiano

=== Singles as lead artist ===
- 5:12
- 105F
- O.V.E.R.
- Hijueputismo (ft. Ñengo Flow)
- Rastri (ft. Marvel Boy)
- Crossfit (Ft. Randy)
- 105F Remix (ft. Farruko, Arcángel, Myke Towers, Darell, Ñengo Flow, Brytiago, Chencho Corleone)
- Farandulera
- Mini Mini
- 2020
- POWER (ft. Myke Towers, Jhay Cortez, Darell)
- Tyson
- Billetes azules (Ft. J Balvin)
- No Lo Niegues (Ft. Jay Wheeler)
- Te Va Bien (with Becky G and Arcángel ft. Darell)
- Por el asterisco (with Faraón Love Shady)

=== Singles as featuring artist ===
- Jukiao Remix (Anonimus and Marvel Boy ft. Kevvo, Juanka, Pablo Chill-E)
- Crossfit (Randy ft. Kevvo)
- Groupie (Casper Magico, Kevvo)
- Muévelo (Hozwal ft. Kevvo)
- El Efecto (Remix) (Rauw Alejandro, Chencho Corleone, and Kevvo featuring Bryant Myers, Lyanno, and Dalex)
- Pa' que te casaste (Brray, Kevvo, Randy)
- La High (Gotay "El Autentiko" ft. Kevvo)
- En La High (Pacho "El Antifeka", Brray, Kevvo)
- Groupie Remix (Casper Magico and Kevvo ft. Pablo Chill-E, Juanka, Brray, Luigi 21 Plus)
- Perreo intenso (Farruko, Ankhal, Kevvo, Guaynaa)
- Natti, Karol, Becky (Jon Z, Kevvo)
- Actúa (Yandel, Ñengo Flow, Kevvo)
- Booty Call (Darell ft. Kevvo)
