= Triste Verano =

Single by Eladio Carrión and Anuel AA
- Language: Spanish
- English title: "Sad Summer"
- Released: April 14, 2023
- Genre: Reggaeton; Latin trap
- Length: 3:32
- Label: Rimas
- Songwriters: Eladio Carrión Morales; Emmanuel Gazmey Santiago; Luian Malavé Nieves
- Producers: Hydro; Hide Miyabi; Bassy; Mambo Kingz; DJ Luian; Ronan Decierdo

Eladio Carrión singles chronology
"Air France" (2023)	"Triste Verano" (2023)	"77" (2023)

Anuel AA singles chronology
"Diablo, Qué Chimba" (2023)	"Triste Verano" (2023)	"Mi Exxx" (2023)

Music video
- "Triste Verano" on YouTube

"Triste Verano" (transl. "Sad Summer") is a song by American rapper Eladio Carrión and Puerto Rican rapper Anuel AA, which was released on April 14, 2023 through Rimas Entertainment. A 15-second snippet of the song was accidentally leaked prior to its release by the former when he shared it on Instagram as a story.

== Background and composition ==
"Triste Verano" is a combination of reggaeton and Latin trap. Anuel AA's verse is likely directed to his ex-girlfriend Karol G; in the lyric "Me acuerdan a ti todas las canciones en la radio", it means that he can't go anywhere without hearing one of her songs. A reference to Bad Bunny's acclaimed album Un Verano Sin Ti is also made in the lyric "Un verano sin ti, me tienes aquí desde junio hasta agosto".

Following the recording of the song, the latter stated that he does not like recording sad songs anymore, and that he only did it for Carrión and one of the song's producers DJ Luian.

== Charts ==
Chart (2023)	Peak position
Spain (PROMUSICAE)	22
US Hot Latin Songs (Billboard)	36

== Certifications ==
Certifications and sales for "Triste Verano"
Region	Certification	Certified units/sales
Spain (Promusicae)	Gold	30,000^{‡}
^{‡} Sales+streaming figures based on certification alone.
