= Más Rica Que Ayer =

Single by Anuel AA, Mambo Kingz and DJ Luian
- Language: Spanish
- Released: March 2, 2023
- Genre: Reggaeton
- Length: 3:20
- Label: Real Hasta la Muerte; Hear This Music
- Songwriters: Emmanuel Gazmey; Edgar Semper; Luian Malave; Xavier Semper
- Producers: DJ Luian; Mambo Kingz; Neneto; BF

Anuel AA singles chronology
"Drippin" (2023)	"Más Rica Que Ayer" (2023)	"Diablo, Qué Chimba" (2023)

Mambo Kingz singles chronology
"Apreton" (2022)	"Más Rica Que Ayer" (2023)	"Mejor Que Yo" (2023)

DJ Luian singles chronology
"Apreton" (2022)	"Más Rica Que Ayer" (2023)	"Mejor Que Yo" (2023)

Music video
- "Más Rica Que Ayer" on YouTube

"Más Rica Que Ayer" (transl. "More Beautiful than Yesterday") is a song by Puerto Rican rapper Anuel AA, Puerto Rican producer duo Mambo Kingz and Puerto Rican DJ and producer DJ Luian. It was released on March 2, 2023, through Real Hasta la Muerte and Hear This Music.

== Background and composition ==
Anuel AA announced the collaboration uploading a story from filming the music video of the song. This is the first collaboration between Anuel, Mambo Kingz and DJ Luian after the song "Tú No Amas".

In the lyrics, Anuel AA mentioned Colombian singer Shakira and Spanish football player Gerard Piqué.

Later Anuel AA confirmed in an Instagram post that "Más Rica Que Ayer" is one of the many songs dedicated to his ex-girlfriend, Colombian singer, Karol G, who also attacked indirectly telling that "they go global when they make songs about me", making reference to the Karol G's song and single, "TQG" with Shakira, which was reported as an diss track to Anuel AA.

== Music video ==
The music video was produced by TruViews and Anuel AA. It shows a couple loving and fighting each other and the artists dancing. At the end of the video Maluma appeared alongside Anuel AA, Mambo Kingz and DJ Luian.

== Live performance ==
Anuel AA performed "Mas Rica Que Ayer" at the 8th Annual Latin American Music Awards on April 20, 2023, at MGM Grand Arena.

== Charts ==
Chart performance for "Mas Rica Que Ayer"
Chart (2023)	Peak position
Argentina Hot 100 (Billboard)	75
Central America (Monitor Latino)	18
Chile (Billboard)	10
Chile Airplay (Los 40)	10
Chile Urbano (Monitor Latino)	10
Colombia (Billboard)	23
Colombia (Promúsica)	15
Costa Rica Urbano (Monitor Latino)	12
Dominican Republic (Monitor Latino)	6
Ecuador (Billboard)	17
Honduras (Monitor Latino)	4
Nicaragua (Monitor Latino)	2
Global 200 (Billboard)	93
Peru (Billboard)	18
Peru (Monitor Latino)	17
Puerto Rico (Monitor Latino)	4
Puerto Rico Urbano (Monitor Latino)	6
Spain (PROMUSICAE)	22
Spain (Billboard)	20
US Bubbling Under Hot 100 (Billboard)	5
US Latin Airplay (Billboard)	25
US Latin Rhythm Airplay (Billboard)	11
US Hot Latin Songs (Billboard)	16
US Latin Digital Song Sales (Billboard)	4

== Certifications ==
Certifications and sales for "Más Rica Que Ayer"
Region	Certification	Certified units/sales
Spain (Promusicae)	Platinum	60,000^{‡}
United States (RIAA)	11× Platinum (Latin)	660,000^{‡}
^{‡} Sales+streaming figures based on certification alone.
