= Real G4 Life =

Series of Reggaeton albums by Ñengo Flow

Studio album by Ñengo Flow
- Released: January 5, 2011
- Recorded: 2010
- Genre: Reggaetón
- Length: 1:07:52
- Labels: Millones Récords; Full Récords
- Producers: Sinfónico; Jan Paul; Nexxvz; Yampi; Onyx; Pain Digital; Dexter; DJ Blass; Omi Corchea

Ñengo Flow chronology
Flow Callejero (2005)	Real G4 Life (2011)	Real G4 Life 2 (2012)

Real G4 Life (Real Gangster For Life) is a series of reggaeton albums by Puerto Rican rapper Ñengo Flow. Distributed by Millones Records, the first álbum in the series Real G4 Life was released on January 5, 2011. It featured collaborations with Jory, De La Ghetto & Gotay "El Auténtiko".

The second album in the series Real G4 Life 2 was released on January 7, 2012.

It featured collaborations with Arcángel, Tego Calderon, Yomo, Voltio, Gotay "El Autentiko", and Delirious.

The third álbum is of in the series Real G4 Life 2.5 was released on October 23, 2012. It featured collaborations with Alexis, Zion, J Alvarez, Gotay "El Autentiko", Jory, Yomo and Jenay.

Real G4 Life 2 peaked at number 75 on the Billboard Top Latin Albums chart while the 2.5 edition peaked at number 61 on the same chart.

== Track listing ==
#	Title	Featuring	Producer(s)	Length
1	"Tu Eres Otra Cosa"	Jory	Sinfónico, Jan Paul & Onyx	3:33
2	"Sinfónico Con Yampi"		Sinfónico & Yampi	4:02
3	"Ahora Veras"		Sinfónico, Jan Paul & Onyx	2:32
4	"En Las Noches Frías"		Pain Digital	4:16
5	"Maniatika"		Jan Paul	3:35
6	"Muerte Instantanea"	John Jay (Solo)	Sinfónico	3:39
7	"Jala Pa' Su Lao"		Sinfonico	3:20
8	"Torturao y To Jodio"		Yampi	4:30
9	"Mafia Verdadera"		Sinfonico	3:36
10	"Dejala Que Vuele"		Yampi	3:04
11	"Gangsta Shit"	John Jay	Sinfonico	3:45
12	"Sabes Que Eres Mia"		Sinfonico, Jan Paul & Dexter	2:19
13	"Deuces (Spanish Version)"	De La Ghetto Feat. Nengo Flow	DJ Blass	4:33
14	"Encendia"	Gotay "El Autentiko"	Yampi	3:24
15	"Soy El Que Mata"	Newtone DR	Omi Corchea	3:21
16	"Me Pide Que Le De"	Randy Glock	Sinfonico	4:33
17	"Sin Perse Ninguna"		Sinfonico & Jan Paul	3:17
18	"Destrucion Masiva"		Sinfonico	3:26
19	"Perdistes"		Sinfonico	3:18

== Real G4 Life 2 (2012) ==
Real G4 Life 2

Studio album by Ñengo Flow
- Released: January 7, 2012
- Genre: Reggaeton
- Length: 1:01:38
- Labels: Full Records; Real G4 Life
- Producers: Onyx; Yampi; Keko Musik; Sinfónico; Galante "El Emperador" (ALX); Alzule "El Bioquimico"; Y-O "La Bestia"; Dexter y Mr. Greenz; Jan Paul; Bryan "La Mente Del Equipo"

Ñengo Flow chronology
Real G4 Life (2011) (2011)	Real G4 Life 2 (2012)	Real G4 Life 2.5 (2012) (2012)

The second volume in the series was released on January 7, 2012.

#	Title	Featuring	Producer(s)	Length
1	"Intro - Cumplimos La Condena"		Keko Musik	3:13
2	"Sigue Viajando"		Y-O & ALX	3:14
3	"Solo Una Oportunidad"		Dexter y Mr. Greenz & Jan Paul	4:10
4	"Pa' Eso Nada Mas"	Gotay "El Autentiko"	Onyx & Sinfónico	3:49
5	"Original G's"	Tego Calderón	Onyx & Sinfónico	3:49
6	"Una Misión"		Keko Musik	4:21
7	"Devórame"	Arcángel	Yampi	3:17
8	"Noche Para Adultos"		Onyx & Yampi	3:47
9	"Mi Calle y Mi Ranking"	Voltio	Keko Musik	4:19
10	"Te Voy A Enseñar"		Alzule, ALX & Bryan	3:42
11	"Yomo Con Nengo"	Yomo	Yampi	4:14
12	"¿Cuánto Te Tardas?"	Gotay "El Autentiko"	Alzule	4:07
13	"The Flight Man"		Yampi	3:23
14	"La Doctora"		Keko Musik	3:19
15	"Cuando Me Dirá"		Yampi	2:22
16	"El Sentimiento Del Miedo"	Delirious	Onyx & Sinfónico	3:07
17	"Borra El Miedo"		Onyx & Sinfónico	3:31

== Real G4 Life 2.5 (2012) ==
Real G4 Life 2.5

Studio album by Ñengo Flow
- Released: October 23, 2012
- Genre: Reggaeton
- Length: 49:29
- Labels: Full Records; Real G4 Life
- Producers: Yampi; Keko Music; Onix; Nexxvz; Sinfonico; Montana "The Producer"; Super Yei; Hi-Flow; Y-O "La Bestia"; Jan Paul; Duran "The Coach"; La Tribu

Ñengo Flow chronology
Real G4 Life 2 (2012)	Real G4 Life 2.5	Los Reyes Del Rap (2015)

The second and a half volume in the series was released on October 23, 2012.

#	Title	Featuring	Producer(s)	Length
1	"Intro - Mano Arriba"		Keko Music	4:07
2	"Tu No Me Respondes"		Montana	3:23
3	"Sigue Viajando (Remix)"	Alexis & Zion	Y-O	4:01
4	"Mas Cerca"		Keko Music	3:46
5	"Traicionera"		Onix, Sinfonico, Nexxvz & Jan Paul	3:34
6	"Una Mision (Remix)"	J Alvarez	Keko Music	4:18
7	"Despertar El Deseo"		Super Yei & Hi-Flow	3:59
8	"Pa' Eso Nada Mas (Remix)"	Gotay "El Autentiko", Jory & Yomo	Onix & Sinfonico	3:53
9	"No Quiero Llegar A Casa"		Yampi	3:28
10	"Fuletazos De Amor"	Jenay	Montana & Duran	3:18
11	"Haciendote El Amor"		Onix & Sinfonico	3:02
12	"No Dice Na (Original)"		Super Yei & Hi-Flow	4:48
13	"Mi Plena"		Onix & La Tribu	4:00
14	"Tu Me Tientas"		Sinfonico & Onyx	4:19

=== Remixes ===
#	Title	Featuring	Producer(s)	Length
1	"No Dice Na (Remix)"	Nicky Jam & Kendo Kaponi	Super Yei & Hi-Flow	5:17

== Chart performance ==
=== Real G4 Life 2 ===
Chart (2012)	Peak position
US Latin Albums (Billboard)	75
US Latin Rhythm Albums (Billboard)	7

=== Real G4 Life 2.5 ===
Chart (2012)	Peak position
US Latin Albums (Billboard)	61
US Latin Rhythm Albums^{[A]} (Billboard)	19

Notes

- A In these territories, Real G4 Life 2.5 was combined with the original chart entry for Real G4 Life 2, and thus re-entered the chart as one release.
