= Verte Ir =

2018 single by DJ Luian and Mambo Kingz

Single by DJ Luian and Mambo Kingz featuring Anuel AA, Nicky Jam, Darell and Brytiago
- Language: Spanish
- Released: March 28, 2019
- Genre: Reggaeton
- Length: 4:27
- Label: Hear This Music
- Songwriters: Luian Malavé; Edgar Semper; Xavier Semper; Emmanuel Gazmey; Nick Rivera; Osvaldo Elías Castro; Bryan Cancel; Eladio Carrión; Juan Diego Medina; Kedin Maysonet; Héctor Ramos
- Producer: Mambo Kingz

DJ Luian singles chronology
"Curiosidad" (2018)	"Verte Ir" (2019)	"Musica" (2019)

Mambo Kingz singles chronology
"Curiosidad" (2018)	"Verte Ir" (2019)	"Musica" (2019)

Anuel AA singles chronology
"Controla" (2019)	"Verte Ir" (2019)	"No Te Veo (remix)" (2019)

Nicky Jam singles chronology
"Tanta Falta (remix)" (2019)	"Verte Ir" (2019)	"Body On My" (2019)

Darell singles chronology
"Se Nos Dio" (2019)	"Verte Ir" (2019)	"Fumeteo" (2019)

Brytiago singles chronology
"Aprendi a Amar" (2019)	"Verte Ir" (2019)	"La Mentira (remix)" (2019)

Music video
- "Verte Ir" on YouTube

"Verte Ir" (transl. "See You Go") is a song by Puerto Rican DJ and producer DJ Luian and Puerto Rican producer duo Mambo Kingz featuring Puerto Rican rapper Anuel AA, American singer Nicky Jam and Puerto Rican rappers and singers Darell and Brytiago. It was released by Hear this Music on March 28, 2019, for digital download and streaming.

== Composition ==
On an Instagram live, Anuel AA previewed a song with Eladio Carrión titled "Verte Ir". However, Carrión didn't appeared at its final version, but was marked as one of the songwriters and Anuel AA and Nicky Jam even mentioned Carrión's name at the end of the song.

== Commercial performance ==
"Verte Ir" peaked at number 17 on the US Billboard Hot Latin Songs chart and at number 6 on the US Billboard Latin Digital Song Sales chart on April 13, 2019. In Spain's official weekly chart, the song debuted at number 59. In Spain's official weekly chart, it debuted at number eight on the PROMUSICAE chart dated March 28, 2019 before reaching the fifth position in its third week on the chart. "Verte Ir" reached the third position in Nicaragua and the fifth position in Colombia and Dominican Republic. In Honduras, the song peaked at number nine.

== Music video ==
The music video for "Verte Ir" was released on March 28, 2019, at the same day the song came out, in Hear This Music's YouTube channel. It begins with a footage of DJ Luian and Mambo Kingz on a plane. They are joining later the other artists dancing alongside women.

== Charts ==
Chart performance for "Verte Ir"
Chart (2019)	Peak position
Colombia (Monitor Latino)	5
Colombia (National-Report)	5
Dominican Republic (Monitor Latino)	5
Ecuador Urbano (Monitor Latino)	17
Honduras (Monitor Latino)	9
Nicaragua (Monitor Latino)	3
Spain (PROMUSICAE)	5
US Hot Latin Songs (Billboard)	17

== Certifications ==
Certifications and sales for "Verte Ir"
Region	Certification	Certified units/sales
Italy (FIMI)	Gold	35,000^{‡}
Spain (Promusicae)	3× Platinum	180,000^{‡}
United States (RIAA)	24× Platinum (Latin)	1,440,000^{‡}
^{‡} Sales+streaming figures based on certification alone.
