= Mejor Que Yo =

Single by Anuel AA, DJ Luian and Mambo Kingz
- Language: Spanish
- Released: May 5, 2023
- Genre: Reggaeton
- Length: 4:03
- Label: Real Hasta la Muerte; Hear This Music; GLAD Empire
- Songwriters: Emmanuel Gazmey; Edgar Semper; Luian Malave; Xavier Semper
- Producers: DJ Luian; Mambo Kingz; Jowny

Anuel AA singles chronology
"Mi Exxx" (2023)	"Mejor Que Yo" (2023)	"Pacto (Remix)" (2023)

DJ Luian singles chronology
"Más Rica Que Ayer" (2023)	"Mejor Que Yo" (2023)	"OA" (2023)

Mambo Kingz singles chronology
"Más Rica Que Ayer" (2023)	"Mejor Que Yo" (2023)	"OA" (2023)

Music video
- "Mejor Que Yo" on YouTube

"Mejor Que Yo" (transl. "Better than Me") is a song by Puerto Rican rapper Anuel AA, Puerto Rican DJ and producer DJ Luian and Puerto Rican producer duo Mambo Kingz. It was released on May 5, 2023, through Real Hasta la Muerte, Hear This Music and GLAD Empire.

== Background and composition ==
Anuel AA hinted the collaboration uploading a story from filming the music video of the song. Anuel, DJ Luian and Mambo Kingz have had many previous collaborations, including their last one, "Más Rica Que Ayer".

Anuel AA announced in an interview for Molusco that his next single will be titled "Mejor Que Yo". In the promotional video he tagged his ex-girlfriend Karol G claiming that he dedicated it to her. In an interview for Alofoke Radio Show, he said that DJ Luian created the song with different lyrics. Later Anuel decided to change the lyrics while thinking about Karol G.

== Commercial performance ==
"Mejor Que Yo" debuted at number 83 on Billboard Hot 100 which is Anuel AA's 14h entry on the chart. For DJ Luian and Mambo Kingz, this was their first appearance on the Billboard Hot 100 chart.

On the US Billboard Hot Latin Songs chart dated May 20, 2023, the song debuted at number 17.

On the Billboard Global 200 the song debuted at number 72 on the chart dated May 20, 2023.

It was later given a Gold certification from PROMUSICAE.

== Controversy ==
In April, 2024, Anuel AA stated via Instagram that Colombian singer Feid is responsible for the removal of the video of "Mejor Que Yo" by suing him through another person. He also blamed him for ruining the plan the song has had.

Colombian art designer Camilo Rojas said that he wasn't forced to sue Anuel AA and did it by himself. The reason is the fact that his artwork, a cross with the scripture "Yo Amo Miami" at Don's Five Star Dive Bar in Miami, is filmed in the video of the song without his permission.

Anuel AA also said that he won the lawsuit and the music video of "Mejor Que Yo" is legally available in his YouTube channel again.

== Music video ==
The music video was produced by TruViews. It was filmed at Don's Five Star Dive Bar in Miami and shows the artists dancing. At the end of the video J Balvin appeared alongside Anuel AA confirming their upcoming collaboration "No Te Olvido", which is supposed to be in J Balvin's upcoming album "Sonríe, Estás en Cámara".

In August, 2023, the music video was deleted by YouTube but was returned in April, 2024.

== Charts ==
Chart performance for "Mejor Que Yo"
Chart (2023)	Peak position
Argentina Hot 100 (Billboard)	71
Chile (Billboard)	15
Colombia (Billboard)	13
Colombia (Promúsica)	10
Dominican Republic Urbano (Monitor Latino)	15
Global 200 (Billboard)	72
Honduras Urbano (Monitor Latino)	15
Nicaragua Urbano (Monitor Latino)	14
Spain (PROMUSICAE)	34
US Billboard Hot 100	83
US Hot Latin Songs (Billboard)	17
US Latin Digital Song Sales (Billboard)	10

== Certifications ==
Certifications and sales for "Mejor Que Yo"
Region	Certification	Certified units/sales
Spain (Promusicae)	Gold	30,000^{‡}
United States (RIAA)	4× Platinum (Latin)	240,000^{‡}
^{‡} Sales+streaming figures based on certification alone.
