= 50 Sombras de Austin =

2015 single by Arcángel and DJ Luian

Single by Arcángel and DJ Luian

from the album Los Favoritos
- Language: Spanish
- English title: "50 Shades of Austin"
- Released: November 20, 2015
- Genre: Reggaeton
- Length: 3:16
- Label: Pina; Flow Factory
- Songwriters: Austin Santos; Luian Nieves
- Producers: DJ Luian; Dexter; Mr. Greenz

Music video
- "50 Sombras de Austin" on YouTube

"50 Sombras de Austin" (transl. "50 Shades of Austin") is a song by American rapper Arcángel and Puerto Rican record producer DJ Luian. It was released on November 20, 2015, through Pina Records, as the lead single from both artists' collaborative album Los Favoritos (2015).

== Charts ==
=== Weekly charts ===
Weekly chart performance for "50 Sombras de Austin"
Chart (2016)	Peak position
US Hot Latin Songs (Billboard)	21
US Latin Airplay (Billboard)	18
US Latin Pop Airplay (Billboard)	28
US Latin Rhythm Airplay (Billboard)	7
US Tropical Airplay (Billboard)	4

=== Year-end charts ===
2016 year-end chart performance for "50 Sombras de Austin"
Chart (2016)	Position
US Hot Latin Songs (Billboard)	75
US Latin Rhythm Airplay (Billboard)	27
US Tropical Airplay (Billboard)	28

== Certifications ==
Certifications and sales for "50 Sombras de Austin"
Region	Certification	Certified units/sales
United States (RIAA)	Platinum (Latin)	60,000^{‡}
^{‡} Sales+streaming figures based on certification alone.
