= El Efecto (song) =

2019 single by Rauw Alejandro and Chencho Corleone

Single by Rauw Alejandro and Chencho Corleone
- Language: Spanish
- English title: "The Effect"
- Released: March 15, 2019
- Genre: Reggaeton
- Length: 3:37
- Label: Duars; Sony Latin
- Songwriters: Raúl A. Ocasio "Rauw Alejandro"; Eric Pérez; José M. Collazo; Luis J. González "Mr. NaisGai"; Nigel Hamelinck; Orlando Javier Valle; Ravi Ramdihal
- Producers: Mr. NaisGai; Nigel Hamelinck; Ravi Ramdihal

Rauw Alejandro singles chronology
"Mírame" (2019)	"El Efecto" (2019)	"Cuerpo en Venta" (2019)

Chencho Corleone singles chronology
"Ella Fuma" (2018)	"El Efecto" (2019)	"Impaciente" (2019)

Music video
- "El Efecto" on YouTube

"El Efecto" (transl. "The Effect") is a song recorded by Puerto Rican singers Rauw Alejandro and Chencho Corleone. It was written by Alejandro, Eric Duars, Colla, Mr. NaisGai, Nigel Hamelinck, Corleone, and Ravi Ramdihal, while the production was handled by Mr. NaisGai, Hamelinck, and Ramdihal. The song was released for digital download and streaming as a single by Duars Entertainment on March 15, 2019. A Spanish language reggaeton song, it is about living the moment since you never know what is going to happen tomorrow. The track received positive reviews from music critics, who complimented its danceable and catchy rhythm.

"El Efecto" was commercially successful, reaching the top 10 in Argentina and Dominican Republic. The song gained further recognition as Ester Expósito's video of dancing to the song went viral on Instagram. It has received several certifications, including platinum in Italy and triple platinum in Spain. An accompanying music video, released simultaneously with the song, was filmed in Puerto Rico and directed by Abner Maldonado. A remix of "El Efecto" with Puerto Rican singer Kevvo featuring Puerto Rican rapper Bryant Myers, Puerto Rican singer Lyanno, and American singer Dalex was released on December 13, 2019. The remix received positive reviews from music critics and was ranked among the 100 best songs for a party by Cosmopolitan. It reached the top 20 in Paraguay, and was certified gold in Spain.

== Background and release ==
On January 4, 2019, Rauw Alejandro shared a video of Chencho Corleone listening to a snippet of their collaboration, announcing its title as "El Efecto". Almost two months later, on March 6, Alejandro shared the artwork for the single on Twitter. Four days later, he confirmed that it would be released on March 15, 2019. The song was released for digital download and streaming by Duars Entertainment on the specified date, marking the first collaboration between Alejandro and Corleone.

An accompanying music video was released simultaneously with the song. The visual was directed by Abner Maldonado, produced by Ivan Joel, and filmed at Asere restaurant in Puerto Rico. Spanish actress and model Ester Expósito shared a video of herself, dancing to "El Efecto" on Instagram, that went viral and increased the popularity of the song. During an interview with Los 40, Alejandro revealed that he talks with Expósito via Instagram Direct and complimented her, saying: "She dances well, she is very talented." It was rumored that Alejandro and Expósito are dating, following the viral video and the compliments. However, Alejandro denied the rumors, stating: "What happens these days is that if they see you with a girl, they already start saying 'they're together' [...] Can't I have friends?"

== Music and lyrics ==
"El Efecto"
A 21-second sample of the chorus

Musically, "El Efecto" is a Spanish language reggaeton song, written by Alejandro, Alejandro, Eric Duars, Colla, Mr. NaisGai, Nigel Hamelinck, Corleone, and Ravi Ramdihal. Its production was handled by Mr. NaisGai, Hamelinck, and Ramdihal, and the track runs for a total of 3 minutes and 37 seconds. Lyrically, "El Efecto" which translates to "The Effect" in English, is about living the moment since you never know what is going to happen tomorrow. The lyrics include, "¿Quién sabe si mañana no te vuelvo a ver? / Vamo' a olvidarno' de lo correcto / Me quiero portar mal, te lo hago saber / La nota ya me hizo el efecto" (Who knows if I won't see you again tomorrow? / Let's forget of what is correct / I want to misbehave, I let you know / The note already had an effect on me).

== Critical reception ==
"El Efecto" has been met with positive reviews from music critics. Happy FM staff gave the song a positive review, saying it "is one of those songs that instantly makes you want to dance". They described its rhythm as "catchy" and highlighted its melody and Alejandro's "own style" that makes the audience "unable to stop listening to it". In 2022, the staff listed "El Efecto" among Corleone's five collaborations with which the artist has made history, noting the singers' voices that "manage to blend perfectly". In the same year, Ernesto Lechner from Rolling Stone ranked the track as Alejandro's 19th-best song, praising "Chencho's manic delivery, juxtaposed with Rauw's laid-back charm". Writing for Billboard, Suzette Fernandez called the song a "hit", while an author of El Día labeled Alejandro "a key, original and different piece in today's music industry" in their review of the song.

== Commercial performance ==
In Spain, "El Efecto" debuted at number 92 on May 5, 2019, becoming Alejandro's fourth and Corleone's first entry on the chart. The song originally peaked at number 48 in June 2019. However, following Expósito's viral video on Instagram, it re-entered the chart in April 2020 and reached a new peak of 32 on the chart issue dated May 31, 2020. The track was later certified triple platinum by the Productores de Música de España (PROMUSICAE), for track-equivalent sales of over 180,000 units in the country. In Italy, the song debuted at number 55 on April 23, 2020, earning both Alejandro and Corleone their first entry. It subsequently peaked at number 22 and was certified platinum by the Federazione Industria Musicale Italiana (FIMI), for track-equivalent sales of over 70,000 units in the country. In Latin America, "El Efecto" reached the top 10 in Argentina and Dominican Republic, as well as the top 20 in Guatemala, Puerto Rico, and Uruguay. The song was also certified 4× platinum+gold by the Asociación Mexicana de Productores de Fonogramas y Videogramas (AMPROFON), for track-equivalent sales of over 270,000 units in Mexico. In the United States, it was certified 9× platinum (Latin) by the Recording Industry Association of America (RIAA), for track-equivalent sales of over 540,000 units.

== Remix ==
"El Efecto (Remix)"

Single by Rauw Alejandro, Chencho Corleone, and Kevvo featuring Bryant Myers, Lyanno, and Dalex
- Language: Spanish
- Released: December 13, 2019
- Length: 4:49
- Label: Duars; Sony Latin
- Songwriters: Raúl A. Ocasio "Rauw Alejandro"; Eric Pérez; José M. Collazo; Luis J. González; Nigel Hamelinck; Orlando Javier Valle; Ravi Ramdihal; Kevin M. Rivera; Bryan R. Rohena; Edgardo R. Cuevas; Pedro D. Daleccio; Pedro J. Figueroa
- Producers: Mr. NaisGai; Nigel Hamelinck; Ravi Ramdihal

Kevvo singles chronology
"Muevelo" (2019)	"El Efecto (Remix)" (2019)	"Mini Mini" (2019)

Bryant Myers singles chronology
"Lowkey" (2019)	"El Efecto (Remix)" (2019)	"Como Panas" (2020)

Lunay singles chronology
"Verano en París (Remix)" (2019)	"El Efecto (Remix)" (2019)	"En Tu Cuerpo" (2020)

Dalex singles chronology
"La Isla" (2019)	"El Efecto (Remix)" (2019)	"Igual o Peor" (2020)

Lyric Video
- "El Efecto (Remix)" on YouTube

On June 26, 2019, Alejandro teased a remix of "El Efecto" via a tweet on his Twitter account: "EL EFECTO REMIX 👀👀👀". On December 13, 2019, he released the remix version with Puerto Rican singer Kevvo featuring Puerto Rican rapper Bryant Myers, Puerto Rican singer Lyanno, and American singer Dalex. Kevvo, Myers, Lyanno, Dalex, and Pedro J. Figueroa joined the original version's lyricists to write the remix version. The version runs for a total of 4 minutes and 49 seconds. An accompanying lyric video was also released simultaneously with the song, which has received over 600 million views on YouTube.

=== Critical reception ===
Linda Yicela Hernández Sanchez from Colombia.com gave "El Efecto (Remix)" a positive review, naming the singers "some of the most exceptional talents of current urban music". She labeled the song "[a] unique collaboration", stating that it "promises to cause a great sensation" within Alejandro's audience, "not only because it is a powerful collaboration, but also because it follows the great success of the original version of it". In 2022, Cosmopolitan ranked it among the 100 best songs for a party.

=== Commercial performance ===
"El Efecto (Remix)" debuted at number 59 on Spain's official weekly chart on the chart issue dated April 26, 2020, becoming Alejandro's fifteenth entry, Corleone's fourth, Kevvo's first, Myers' eighth, Lyanno's fourth, and Dalex's eleventh. On May 31, 2020, the song reached its peak of number 49. The track was later certified platinum by the Productores de Música de España (PROMUSICAE), for track-equivalent sales of over 60,000 units in the country.

In Latin America, the song peaked at number 15 in Paraguay, number 45 in Colombia, number 46 in Peru, and number 16 on Monitor Latino's Costa Rica Urbano. The song was also certified double platinum by the Asociación Mexicana de Productores de Fonogramas y Videogramas (AMPROFON), for track-equivalent sales of over 120,000 units in Mexico.

== Track listings ==
Digital download / streaming
No.	Title	Length
1.	"El Efecto"	3:37

Digital download / streaming
No.	Title	Length
1.	"El Efecto (Remix) [feat. Bryant Myers, Lyanno & Dalex]"	4:49

== Credits and personnel ==
Credits adapted from Spotify.

- Rauw Alejandro – associated performer, composer, lyricist
- Chencho Corleone – associated performer, composer, lyricist
- Eric Pérez – composer, lyricist
- José M. Collazo – composer, lyricist
- Mr. NaisGai – composer, lyricist, producer
- Nigel Hamelinck – composer, lyricist, producer
- Ravi Ramdihal – composer, lyricist, producer
- Kevvo – associated performer, composer, lyricist for the remix version
- Bryant Myers – associated performer, composer, lyricist for the remix version
- Lyanno – associated performer, composer, lyricist for the remix version
- Dalex – associated performer, composer, lyricist for the remix version
- Pedro J. Figueroa – composer, lyricist for the remix version

== Charts ==
=== Weekly charts ===
Weekly peak performance for "El Efecto"
Chart (2019–2020)	Peak position
Argentina Hot 100 (Billboard)	10
Dominican Republic (Monitor Latino)	7
Ecuador Urbano (Monitor Latino)	19
Global Excl. US (Billboard) (Note: The Billboard Global Excl. US chart was launched in September 2020. Therefore, the song did not have a full run on the chart.)	124
Guatemala (Monitor Latino)	19
Italy (FIMI)	22
Peru Streaming (UNIMPRO)	119
Puerto Rico (Monitor Latino)	15
Spain (Promusicae)	32
Uruguay (Monitor Latino)	17

Weekly peak performance for "El Efecto (Remix)"
Chart (2020)	Peak position
Colombia (National-Report)	45
Costa Rica Urbano (Monitor Latino)	16
Peru Streaming (UNIMPRO)	46
Spain (Promusicae)	49

=== Monthly charts ===
Monthly chart position for "El Efecto (Remix)"
Chart (2020)	Peak position
Paraguay (SGP)	15

=== Year-end charts ===
2019 year-end chart performance for "El Efecto"
Chart (2019)	Position
Puerto Rico Urbano (Monitor Latino)	74
Uruguay (Monitor Latino)	54

2020 year-end chart performance for "El Efecto"
Chart (2020)	Position
Colombia (Monitor Latino)	91
Ecuador Urbano (Monitor Latino)	95
Peru (Monitor Latino)	42

2020 year-end chart performance for "El Efecto (Remix)"
Chart (2020)	Position
Costa Rica Urbano (Monitor Latino)	92
Paraguay Urbano (Monitor Latino)	64

2021 year-end chart performance for "El Efecto"
Chart (2021)	Position
Guatemala Pop (Monitor Latino)	72
Peru Urbano (Monitor Latino)	61

== Certifications ==
Certifications and sales for "El Efecto"
Region	Certification	Certified units/sales
Italy (FIMI)	Platinum	70,000^{‡}
Mexico (AMPROFON)	2× Diamond+4× Platinum	840,000^{‡}
Mexico (AMPROFON) Remix version	2× Platinum	120,000^{‡}
Spain (Promusicae)	3× Platinum	180,000^{‡}
Spain (Promusicae) Remix version	2× Platinum	120,000^{‡}
United States (RIAA)	9× Platinum (Latin)	540,000^{‡}
Streaming
Chile (Profovi) Remix version	Gold	11,000,000
^{‡} Sales+streaming figures based on certification alone.

== Release history ==
Release dates and formats for "El Efecto"
Region	Date	Format	Version	Label	Ref(s)
Latin America	March 15, 2019	Contemporary hit radio	Original	Sony Music	
Various	March 15, 2019	Digital download; streaming	Original	Duars Entertainment	
Various	December 13, 2019	Digital download; streaming	Remix	Duars Entertainment	

== See also ==
- List of Billboard Argentina Hot 100 top-ten singles in 2020
