= Clika =

2026 American drama film

- Theatrical release poster
- Directed by: Michael Greene
- Screenplay by: Michael Greene; Jimmy Humilde; Sean McBride
- Produced by: Jimmy Humilde
- Starring: JayDee; Cristian Gutierrez; Daniel Lopez; Laura Lopez; Nana Ponceleon; OhGeesy; Percy Miller; Peter Greene; Eric Roberts
- Cinematography: Ski-ter Jones; Jeffrey Carolan
- Edited by: Tess Karmann; Maryann Brandon
- Production companies: Columbia Pictures; Sony Music Latin; Sony Music Vision; Rancho Humilde
- Distributed by: Sony Pictures Releasing
- Release dates: January 20, 2026 (TCL Chinese Theater); January 23, 2026 (United States)
- Running time: 83 minutes
- Country: United States
- Language: English
- Box office: $3 million

Clika is a 2026 American drama film written and directed by Michael Greene and co-written by Jimmy Humilde and Sean McBride. It stars Jay Dee, Cristian Gutierrez, Daniel Lopez, Laura Lopez, Nana Ponceleon, OhGeesy, Uziel Pantoja, Josh Benitez, Francine Sena, Percy Miller, Peter Greene, and Eric Roberts.

Clika premiered at the TCL Chinese Theater on January 20, 2026, and was released in the United States on January 23, by Columbia Pictures through Sony Pictures Releasing. The film received negative reviews from critics and grossed $3 million.

== Cast ==
- Jay Dee as Chito
- Cristian Gutierrez as Alfredo
- Daniel Lopez as Blunt
- Laura Lopez as Candy
- Nana Ponceleon as Mari
- OhGeesy as OhGeesy
- Eric Roberts as Angelo
- Uziel Pantoja as Flaco
- Josh Benitez as Chuy
- Francine Sena as Chela
- Percy Miller as Bullet
- Peter Greene as Lieutenant Jones

== Production ==
In March 2025, it was announced that Clika was directed by Michael Greene and written by Greene, Jimmy Humilde, and Sean McBride. Principal photography took place in Yuba City on 2023, with Ski-ter Jones and Jeffrey Carolan serving as the cinematographer. Tess Karmann and Maryann Brandon edited the film, with the latter being added by Sony to work on the film. Friday, 8 Mile, and Boyz in the Hood served as inspirations for the film.

== Release ==
Clika premiered at the TCL Chinese Theater in Los Angeles on January 20, 2026, and was released in the United States on January 23. It was originally scheduled to release in the United States on August 15, 2025. However, it was later silently removed from the schedule for unknown reasons.

== Reception ==
=== Box office ===
As of February 16, 2026, Clika has grossed $3 million in the United States and Canada.

Clika was released alongside Mercy, Return to Silent Hill, and wide releases of Arco and H Is for Hawk. The film opened in 522 theaters, and grossed $1.26 million on its opening weekend.

=== Critical reception ===
Clika received negative reviews from critics. On the review aggregator website Rotten Tomatoes, 10% of 10 critics' reviews are positive, with an average rating of 3.1/10.

Brandon Yu of The New York Times wrote "What glaringly sheds in its performances and direction is some of the sturdiness of a more traditional Hollywood production. But that also matters less in a movie like this, one clearly made, with love and belief, by and for the people it centers".

Monica Castillo of RogerEbert.com criticized the "electricity and excitement" of the film.

Katie Walsh of The Seattle Times criticized the clichés, dialogue and narration of the film, as well as the plot points, and wrote that the emotional stakes aren't legible.
