= Don Don =

2020 single by Daddy Yankee, Anuel AA and Kendo Kaponi

Single by Daddy Yankee, Anuel AA and Kendo Kaponi
- Language: Spanish
- Released: 11 September 2020
- Length: 4:36
- Label: El Cartel; Universal
- Songwriters: Mark Andrews; Ramón Ayala; Desmond Child; Emmanuel Gazmey; Tim Kelley; Luian Malave; Rafael Pina; José Morales Rivera; Bob Robinson; Draco Rosa; Edgar Semper; Xavier Semper
- Producers: Hydro; Mambo Kingz; DJ Luian

Daddy Yankee singles chronology
| "Relación (Remix)" (2020) | "Don Don" (2020) | "De Vuelta Pa' La Vuelta" (2020) |

Anuel AA singles chronology
| "Elegí (Remix)" (2020) | "Don Don" (2020) | "Reloj" (2020) |

Kendo Kaponi singles chronology
| "Resistencia" (2020) | "Don Don" (2020) |

Music video
- "Don Don" on YouTube

"Don Don" is a song by Puerto Rican rappers Daddy Yankee, Anuel AA and Kendo Kaponi. The song was released by El Cartel Records and Universal Latino on 11 September 2020. It was Daddy Yankee's first release under a multi-million dollar partnership with Universal Music Group, which allows him to be involved in music, film, and television projects with the group. "Don Don" samples and interpolates the 1999 single, "Thong Song" by American singer Sisqó, who later appeared on the remix of "Don Don." The song debuted and peaked at number 10 on the Billboard Hot Latin Songs chart.

== Background and composition ==
Just before the release of "Don Don", Daddy Yankee announced a multi-million dollar partnership with Universal Music Group. The deal would allow for Daddy Yankee to venture into music, film, and television projects with the label. Yankee described his partnership as "one of the biggest commitments to an artist in the history of Latin music". "Don Don", which released on 11 September 2020, became the first release under the partnership.

"Don Don" samples and interpolates American singer Sisqó's 1999 hit single "Thong Song". Daddy Yankee had previously sampled "Thong Song" in his 2001 song "Tu Cuerpo en la Cama", alongside fellow Puerto Rican artist Nicky Jam, from Yankee's album El Cartel II.

"Don Don" features fellow Puerto Rican rappers Anuel AA and Kendo Kaponi. Yankee, Anuel and Kaponi have all collaborated with each other at some point during their careers. Daddy Yankee and Anuel AA had previously collaborated on songs such as "Adictiva" (2018) and "China" (2019). Yankee and Kendo Kaponi had collaborated on "Llegamos a la Disco" from Yankee's album Prestige (2012). Anuel and Kendo had collaborated on the song "Delincuente" alongside fellow Puerto Rican artist Farruko on the latter's album Gangalee (2019).

== Music video ==
The music video for "Don Don" was released alongside the song itself. It was directed by Fernando Lugo and stars all three artists. The music video has generated over 80 million views on YouTube as of November 2020.

== Remix ==
On 21 October 2020, Daddy Yankee, Anuel AA, and Kendo Kaponi debuted a new version of "Don Don" at the 2020 Billboard Latin Music Awards. The new version featured vocals by Sisqó, whose song "Thong Song" was sampled in "Don Don." In the new version, Sisqó blends in the lyrics to "Thong Song" over the instrumental for "Don Don." The Billboard performance of the remix was released online the day after the awards, and an official studio version was released weeks later on 5 November 2020.

== Charts ==
| Chart (2020) | Peak position |
|---|---|
| Argentina (Argentina Hot 100) | 55 |
| Global 200 (Billboard) | 101 |
| Dominican Republic (SODINPRO) | 32 |
| Honduras (Monitor Latino) | 12 |
| Nicaragua (Monitor Latino) | 7 |
| Puerto Rico (Monitor Latino) | 6 |
| Spain (PROMUSICAE) | 16 |
| US Hot Latin Songs (Billboard) | 10 |

== Certifications ==
| Region | Certification | Certified units/sales |
|---|---|---|
| Spain (Promusicae) | Platinum | 40,000^{‡} |
| United States (RIAA) | 2× Platinum (Latin) | 120,000^{‡} |
^{‡} Sales+streaming figures based on certification alone.
