= Mi Exxx =

Single by Wisin and Anuel AA

from the album Mr. W
- Language: Spanish
- Released: April 20, 2023
- Genre: Reggaeton
- Length: 3:14
- Label: La Base; WK
- Songwriters: Juan Luis Morena Luna; Emmanuel Gazmey; Marcos Ramirez; Victor Torres Betancourt
- Producer: Los Legendarios

Wisin singles chronology
"Tu Recuerdo" (2023)	"Mi Exxx" (2023)	"Baja, Sube, Sube" (2023)

Anuel AA singles chronology
"Triste Verano" (2023)	"Mi Exxx" (2023)	"Mejor Que Yo" (2023)

Music video
- "Mi Exxx" on YouTube

"Mi Exxx" (stylized in all caps) is a song by Puerto Rican rappers Wisin and Anuel AA. It was produced by Los Legendarios and was released on April 20, 2023, through La Base Music Group and WK Records as the second single from Wisin's seventh studio album Mr. W (2024).

== Background and composition ==
Wisin and Anuel AA announced the collaboration in an interview for Univison Noticias. Both artists previously collaborated on numerous singles, including "Pensando en Ti" and the remixes of "Sola" and "Fiel".

There is speculation that the song is associated with Anuel AA's ex-partner Karol G. Wisin and Anuel denied these claims.

== Awards and nominations ==
Awards and nominations for '"Mi Exxx"
Year	Ceremony	Category	Result
2023	Premios Juventud	Best song for My Ex	Nominated

== Music video ==
The music video of the song got released hours before the ceremony of the Latin American Music Awards.

== Live performance ==
Wisin and Anuel AA performed "Mi Exxx" at the 8th Annual Latin American Music Awards on April 20, 2023, at MGM Grand Arena.

== Charts ==
Chart performance for "Mi Exxx"
Chart (2023)	Peak position
Chile (Monitor Latino)	3
Costa Rica Urbano (Monitor Latino)	12
Dominican Republic (Monitor Latino)	5
Honduras (Monitor Latino)	9
Nicaragua (Monitor Latino)	9
Spain (PROMUSICAE)	57
US Hot Latin Songs (Billboard)	40

== Certifications ==
Certifications and sales for "Mi Exxx"
Region	Certification	Certified units/sales
United States (RIAA)	2× Platinum (Latin)	120,000^{‡}
^{‡} Sales+streaming figures based on certification alone.
