= DJ Luian =

Puerto Rican record producer (born 1990)

- Born: Luian Malavé Nieves; September 29, 1990 (age 36); Carolina, Puerto Rico
- Genres: Reggaeton; Latin trap; Latin R&B; Latin pop
- Occupations: Record producer; disc jockey; songwriter
- Years active: 2010–present
- Label: Hear This Music

Luian Malavé Nieves (born September 29, 1990), better known as DJ Luian, is a Puerto Rican record producer and DJ. He is recognized for working with artists such as Anuel AA, Arcángel, Bad Bunny, J Balvin, Don Omar, among others. In 2015, he founded along with Puerto Rican producer duo Mambo Kingz the record label Hear This Music.

== Early life ==
Malavé was interested in music from a very young age. His first steps in music are related to his work on Don Omar's album Meet the Orphans (2010).

== Career ==
In 2014, DJ Luian released his single as an artist titled "Tremenda Sata" featuring American rapper Arcángel. Later, three remix versions for the song also came out. In 2015, he participated on Wise's eight studio album F14. On December 19, 2015, he released his first studio album Los Favoritos with Arcángel.

In 2016, DJ Luian began working with Puerto Rican producers and songwriters Edgar Semper and Xavier Semper, better known as Puerto Rican producer duo Mambo Kingz. The first release under their record label Hear This Music was the single "La Ocasión" with American rapper De La Ghetto featuring Arcángel and Puerto Rican rappers and singers Ozuna and Anuel AA. In July of the same year, DJ Luian signed Puerto Rican rapper Bad Bunny who was the first artist to sign a record deal with the company. Bad Bunny's first release under Hear This Music was the remix of the song "Diles" with Ozuna and Farruko, featuring Arcángel and Ñengo Flow on August 26, 2016.

On January 19, 2018, DJ Luian and Mambo Kingz released "Solita", a collaboration with Ozuna featuring Bad Bunny, Wisin and Almighty. On November 6, 2018, they released the single "Bubalú" featuring Anuel AA and American singers Prince Royce and Becky G. The song was certified with 21× Platinum by RIAA. In December 2018, after having released his debut album X 100pre, Bad Bunny announced that he would no longer work with the record label.

In 2019, DJ Luian and Mambo Kingz collaborated with Anuel AA, Darell, Nicky Jam and Brytiago on the song Verte Ir, which has earned a double-diamond certification by RIAA. Later, another collaboration featuring Anuel AA, Karol G and Arcángel titled "Tú No Amas" came out. They also handled the production and songwriting of 13 songs from Becky G's studio album Mala Santa.

In 2021, DJ Luian appeared in Anuel AA and Ozuna's collaborative album Los Dioses as producer and songwriter of the songs "Contra el Mundo" and "Perfecto". Later, he released the single "Aloha" featuring Maluma, Beéle, Rauw Alejandro and Darell.

In 2023, DJ Luian and Mambo Kingz began working with Anuel AA in collaboration between record labels Hear This Music and Real Hasta la Muerte. On March 2, 2023, they released the single "Más Rica Que Ayer". After its success, they released another single titled "Mejor Que Yo". The song debuted at number 86 at the Billboard Hot 100 chart, which was DJ Luian and Mambo Kingz' first entry on the chart. Later, they worked on Anuel AA's unreleased (later cancelled) extended play Rompecorazones. On October 13, 2024, the producer duo featured on Anuel AA's single "OA" with Quevedo and Maluma.

In 2024, Hear This Music released two singles - "Mil Palabras" with Jay Wheeler, Natti Natasha and Luar la L and "Razones" with Ozuna and Anuel AA.

== Discography ==
=== Albums ===
List of albums, with selected chart positions
| Title | Album details | Peak chart positions | | | Certifications |
| Title | Album details | US Latin | US Latin Rhythm | US Rap | Certifications |
|---|---|---|---|---|---|
| Los Favoritos (with Arcángel) | Released: December 11, 2015; Labels: Pina Records; Format: CD, digital download | 2 | 1 | 11 | RIAA: Gold (Latin) |

=== Singles ===
==== As lead artist ====
List of singles as lead artist, with selected chart positions, showing year released and album name
| Title | Year | Peak chart positions | | | | | | | | | Certifications | Album | |
| Title | Year | US | US Latin | ARG | CHI | COL | ECU | PER | SPA | WW | Certifications | Album | |
|---|---|---|---|---|---|---|---|---|---|---|---|---|---|
| "La Ocasión" (with Mambo Kingz and De la Ghetto featuring Arcángel, Ozuna and Anuel AA) | 2016 | — | 21 | — | — | — | — | — | — | — | RIAA: 18× Platinum (Latin); PROMUSICAE: Platinum | Non-album singles | |
| "Me Mata" (with Bad Bunny and Mambo Kingz featuring Arcángel, Almighty, Bryant Myers, Baby Rasta, Noriel and Brytiago) | 2016 | — | — | — | — | — | — | — | — | — | RIAA: 21× Platinum (Latin); PROMUSICAE: Platinum | Non-album singles | |
| "Simple" (with Ozuna and Mambo Kingz featuring Cosculluela, Ñengo Flow and Baby Rasta & Gringo) | 2017 | — | — | — | — | — | — | — | — | — | RIAA: 2× Platinum (Latin) | Non-album singles | |
| "Solita" (with Ozuna and Mambo Kingz featuring Bad Bunny, Almighty and Wisin) | 2018 | — | 20 | — | — | — | — | — | 20 | — | RIAA: 44× Platinum (Latin); PROMUSICAE: 2× Platinum; FIMI: Gold | Non-album singles | |
| "Curiosidad" (with Yandel featuring Jon Z, Zion and Noriel) | 2018 | — | — | — | — | — | — | — | — | — | RIAA: Platinum (Latin) | Non-album singles | |
| "Bubalú" (with Mambo Kingz featuring Anuel AA, Prince Royce and Becky G) | 2018 | — | 22 | 74 | — | — | — | — | 12 | — | RIAA: 24× Platinum (Latin); PROMUSICAE: 2× Platinum | Non-album singles | |
| "Verte Ir" (with Mambo Kingz featuring Anuel AA, Nicky Jam, Darell and Brytiago) | 2019 | — | 17 | — | — | — | — | — | 5 | — | RIAA: 24× Platinum (Latin); PROMUSICAE: 3× Platinum; FIMI: Gold | Non-album singles | |
| "Tú No Amas" (with Mambo Kingz featuring Anuel AA, Karol G and Arcángel) | 2019 | — | — | — | — | — | — | — | 39 | — | RIAA: 8× Platinum (Latin); PROMUSICAE: Gold | Non-album singles | |
| "Música" (with Mambo Kingz and Farruko featuring Wisin, Myke Towers and Arcángel) | 2019 | — | — | — | — | — | — | — | — | — | RIAA: 2× Platinum (Latin) | Non-album singles | |
| "Más Rica Que Ayer" (with Anuel AA and Mambo Kingz) | 2023 | — | 16 | 75 | 10 | 23 | 17 | 18 | 22 | 93 | RIAA: 8× Platinum (Latin); PROMUSICAE: Platinum | Non-album singles | |
| "Mejor Que Yo" (with Anuel AA and Mambo Kingz) | 2023 | 83 | 17 | 71 | 15 | 13 | — | — | 34 | 72 | PROMUSICAE: Gold | Non-album singles | |
| "Razones" (with Ozuna and Anuel AA featuring Mambo Kingz) | 2024 | — | 20 | — | — | — | — | — | 21 | — | | Non-album singles | |
| "Aheh-Aheh" (official song of the 2024 FIFA U-20 Women's World Cup, with Nath and Ysa C featuring Mambo Kingz) | 2024 | | — | — | — | — | — | — | — | — | — | Non-album singles | — |

==== As featured artist ====
List of singles as featured artist, with selected chart positions, showing year released and album name
| Title | Year | Peak chart positions | | | Certifications | Album |
| Title | Year | US Bub. | US Latin | SPA | Certifications | Album |
|---|---|---|---|---|---|---|
| "Diles" (Bad Bunny, Ozuna and Farruko featuring Arcángel, Ñengo Flow, Mambo Kingz and DJ Luian) | 2016 | — | — | 85 | RIAA: 4× Platinum (Latin); PROMUSICAE: 3× Platinum | Non-album singles |
| "Tú No Vive Así" (Bad Bunny and Arcángel featuring DJ Luian and Mambo Kingz) | 2016 | — | 20 | — | RIAA: 9× Platinum (Latin); PROMUSICAE: 2× Platinum | Non-album singles |
| "Blockia" (Bad Bunny and Farruko featuring DJ Luian and Mambo Kingz) | 2017 | — | 48 | — | RIAA: Gold (Latin) | Non-album singles |
| "Sensualidad" (Bad Bunny, Prince Royce and J Balvin featuring Mambo Kingz and DJ Luian) | 2017 | 9 | 8 | 1 | RIAA: 28× Platinum (Latin); PROMUSICAE: 3× Platinum | Non-album singles |
| "Aloha" (Maluma, Beéle and Rauw Alejandro featuring Mambo Kingz, DJ Luian and Darell) | 2021 | — | 49 | 11 | RIAA: 6× Platinum (Latin); PROMUSICAE: 2× Platinum | Non-album singles |
| "En Alta" (J Balvin, Omar Courtz and Yovngchimi featuring Quevedo, Mambo Kingz and DJ Luian) | 2023 | — | — | 63 | | Rayo |
| "OA" (Anuel AA, Maluma and Quevedo featuring DJ Luian and Mambo Kingz) | 2023 | — | — | 5 | RIAA: 4× Platinum (Latin); PROMUSICAE: 3× Platinum | Non-album singles |

=== Other charted songs ===
List of other charted songs, with selected chart positions, showing year released and album name
| Title | Year | Peak chart positions | | | | Certifications | Album |
| Title | Year | US Latin | US Latin Rhy. | US Trop. | US Latin Pop | Certifications | Album |
|---|---|---|---|---|---|---|---|
| "50 Sombras de Austin" (with Arcángel) | 2015 | 21 | 7 | 4 | 28 | RIAA: Platinum (Latin) | Los Favoritos |
