= Brytiago =

Puerto Rican singer-songwriter

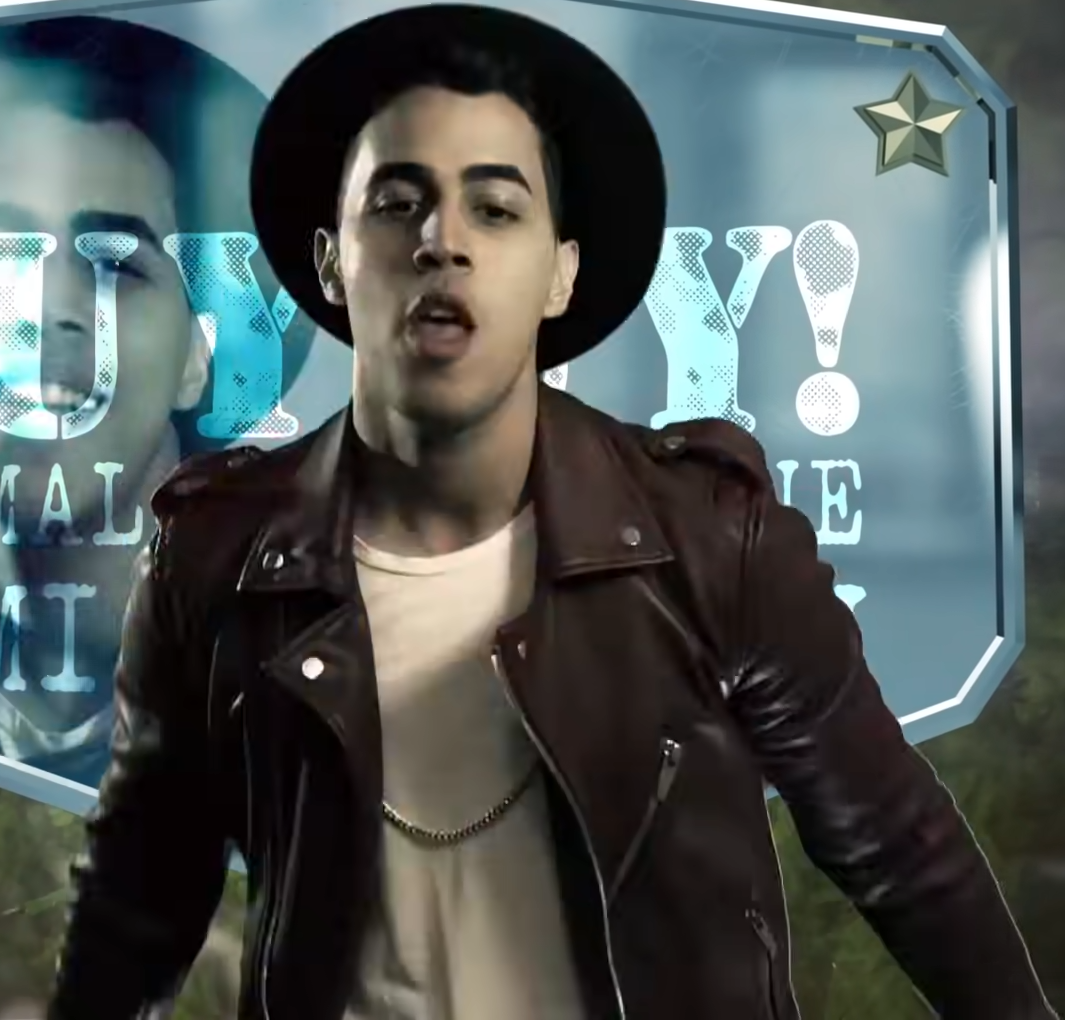
- Brytiago in the music video for "Alerta Roja", 2016

Background information
- Born: Bryan Cancel Santiago; July 14, 1992 (age 33); Carolina, Puerto Rico
- Genres: Reggaeton; Latin trap; Latin R&B
- Occupations: Singer; songwriter
- Instrument: Vocals
- Years active: 2014–present
- Label: El Cartel

Bryan Cancel Santiago (born July 14, 1992), better known by his stage name Brytiago, is a Puerto Rican singer and songwriter. He was born in Carolina, Puerto Rico. He started his career in 2014, at age 21. In 2016, when he was 23 years old, he joined El Cartel Records, Daddy Yankee's record label. He has released several songs such as "Bebé", "Lonely", "Punto G", "High", "Abuso", which have all achieved moderate success in Latin America. In 2018, he released "Bipolar", along with Ozuna and Chris Jedi. The single was a success, and peaked at No. 17 on the Billboard Hot Latin Songs chart.

In 2018, Brytiago released "Asesina" with Darell. Following the release of the remix featuring Daddy Yankee, Anuel AA, and Ozuna, it would become his first top ten on the Billboard Hot Latin Songs chart.

In February 2019, Brytiago collaborated with Anuel AA for the song "Controla."

== Early life ==
Brytiago taught himself from a young age how to sing and write all his life experiences in lyrics. He developed a unique, genuine and sticky style; with which he brings in his first single "Hay Algo en Ti"; which premiered in July 2014. Just two years after beginning his musical career, he was signed in Daddy Yankee's label El Cartel Records. Brytiago had been a big fan of him since he was very young. On an interview with Billboard, he said: "When I was eight years old, I took a picture with Daddy Yankee like any other fan who grew up listening to his music... But I never imagined that years later I would be signed to his label or that an artist like him would give me support and help me in my career. This is one of the greatest blessings I have received in my life". He later appeared as a guest artist on Daddy Yankee's song "Alerta Roja".

== Discography ==
=== Albums ===
==== Studio albums ====
List of studio albums, with year released and selected chart positions
Title	Album details	Peak chart positions		Certifications
Title	Album details	US Latin	SPA	Certifications
Orgánico	Released: July 17, 2020; Labels: Duars Entertainment, Business Music; Format: Streaming, digital download	15	30	RIAA: Gold (Latin)

==== Collaborative albums ====
List of collaborative albums, with year released and selected chart positions
Title	Album details	Peak chart positions
Title	Album details	US Latin Rhythm
Wise the Gold Pen Presents: Trap Miami (as part of Los Eleven)	Released: November 11, 2016; Labels: Sony Music Latin; Format: Streaming, digital download	6

=== Extended plays ===
List of Extended plays, with year released
Title	EP details
Deluxe	Released: September 3, 2021; Labels: Duars Entertainment, Business Music; Format: Streaming, digital download

=== Singles ===
==== As lead artist ====
List of singles as lead artist, with selected chart positions
Title	Year	Peak chart positions				Certifications	Album
Title	Year	US Bub.	US Latin	ARG	SPA	Certifications	Album
"Matame"	2015	—	—	—N/a	—		Non-album singles
"Punto G" (featuring Darell)	2016	—	—	—N/a	—		Non-album singles
"Tú Estás Con El" (Remix) (featuring Anonimous)	2016	—	—	—N/a	—		Non-album singles
"Dicen Que Estoy Guillao" (with MK, Joan Antonio, and Miky Woodz)	2016	—	—	—N/a	—		Non-album singles
"Nos Quieren Ver Mal" (featuring Bryant Myers and Almighty)	2016	—	—	—N/a	—		Non-album singles
"Hagámoslo"	2016	—	—	—N/a	—		Non-album singles
"Dime a Vel" (featuring Almighty)	2016	—	—	—N/a	—		Non-album singles
"Bebé"	2016	—	—	—N/a	—		Non-album singles
"Los Scanners" (featuring Juanka, Miky Woodz, Darell, and Julillo)	2016	—	—	—N/a	—		Non-album singles
"Lonely" (featuring Darell)	2016	—	—	—N/a	—		Non-album singles
"Punto G" (Remix) (featuring Darell, Arcángel, Farruko, De La Ghetto, and Ñengo Flow)	2017	—	—	—N/a	—		Non-album singles
"Luna"	2017	—	—	—N/a	—		Non-album singles
"Bebé" (Remix) (featuring Daddy Yankee and Nicky Jam)	2017	—	—	—N/a	100		Non-album singles
"Netflixxx" (with Bad Bunny)	2017	—	—	—N/a	82	RIAA: Platinum (Latin)	Non-album singles
"La Despedida"	2017	—	—	—N/a	—		Non-album singles
"Todo el Mundo Mata Gente" (with Darell)	2017	—	—	—N/a	—		Non-album singles
"El Gatito de Mi Ex" (Remix) (with Benny Benni and Noriel featuring Pusho, Darkiel, Juhn, Gigolo y la Exce, and Pacho)	2017	—	—	—N/a	—		Non-album singles
"Luna" (Remix) (featuring Cosculluela and Justin Quiles)	2017	—	—	—N/a	—		Non-album singles
"Ahora Sé" (Remix) (with Menor Menor and Lary Over featuring Darell, Amenazzy, and MC Pedrinho)	2018	—	—	—N/a	—		Carbon Fiber Hits and Trinity La Marca
"Apaga la Luz" (with TYS Musica and Shadow Blow featuring Fuego)	2018	—	—	—N/a	—		Non-album singles
"Abuso" (featuring Farruko and Lary Over)	2018	—	—	—N/a	—		Non-album singles
"Bipolar" (with Chris Jedi and Ozuna)	2018	—	17	88	37	RIAA: Platinum (Latin); PROMUSICAE: Gold	Non-album singles
"Todo el Mundo Mata Gente" (Remix) (with Ñengo Flow and Darell featuring Ele A El Dominio, Pacho El Antifeka, Juanka El Problematik, Sinfónico, and The Secret Panda)	2018	—	—	—	—		Non-album singles
"Asesina" (with Darell)	2018	—	17^{1}	14^{1}	12	RIAA: 12× Platinum (Latin); PROMUSICAE: 3× Platinum	Non-album singles
"Calentita" (with Khea)	2018	—	—	—	—		Non-album singles
"La Mentira" (with Rafa Pabön)	2018	—	—	—	—	RIAA: Gold (Latin)	Non-album singles
"Asesina" (Remix) (with Darell featuring Daddy Yankee, Ozuna, and Anuel AA)	2018	13^{2}	7^{2}	11^{2}	—	RIAA: 4× Platinum (Latin)	Non-album singles
"Controla" (with Anuel AA)	2019	—	28	60	41	PROMUSICAE: Gold	Non-album singles
"Aprendí a Amar"	2019	—	—	—	—		Non-album singles
"La Mentira" (Remix) (with Rafa Pabön and Sech featuring Myke Towers, Cazzu, and Rauw Alejandro)	2019	—	—	—	—		Non-album singles
"Velitas" (with Darell)	2019	—	—	—	22	AMPROFON: Gold; PROMUSICAE: Platinum	Non-album singles
"Ay Luli" (with Cauty)	2019	—	—	—	—		Non-album singles
"Deja Que Fluya" (with Lary Over)	2019	—	—	—	—		Non-album singles
"Recuerdos" (with Juhn and Farruko featuring Myke Towers and Lenny Tavárez)	2019	—	—	—	—		Non-album singles
"Otro Round" (with Jon Z and Noriel)	2019	—	—	—	—		Non-album singles
"Cardio" (with Lary Over featuring De La Ghetto)	2019	—	—	—	—		Non-album singles
"Cenizas"	2019	—	—	—	—		Non-album singles
"Contento"	2019	—	—	—	—		Non-album singles
"Throwback"	2019	—	—	—	—		Non-album singles
"Que Le Dé" (Remix) (with Rauw Alejandro and Nicky Jam featuring Myke Towers and Justin Quiles)	2019	—	—	—	—		Non-album singles
"Hoy Se Bebe" (Remix) (with Nio García and Rauw Alejandro)	2019	—	—	—	—		Non-album singles
"Toxico" (with Myke Towers)	2019	—	—	—	—		Non-album singles
"Infiel" (with Eix and Rauw Alejandro featuring Los Fantastikos)	2019	—	—	—	—	RIAA: Platinum (Latin)	Yo Soy Eix
"Te Fallé"	2020	—	—	—	—	RIAA: Platinum (Latin)	Orgánico
"Sin Ti" (Remix) (with Jay Wheeler and DJ Nelson)	2020	—	—	—	—		Platónicos
"Dispo" (with Jhay Cortez)	2020	—	—	—	—	RIAA: Gold (Latin)	Orgánico
"Borracho" (with Wisin)	2020	—	— (Note: "Borracho" did not enter the Hot Latin Songs chart, but peaked at 44 on the Latin Airplay chart.)	—	—	RIAA: Gold (Latin)	Orgánico
"Te Fallé" (Remix) (with Dalex and Lenny Tavárez)	2020	—	—	—	—		Orgánico
"Cositas" (with Rauw Alejandro)	2020	—	—	—	—	RIAA: Gold (Latin)	Orgánico
"Olvidando" (with Darell)	2020	—	—	—	—	RIAA: Gold (Latin)	Orgánico
"Condena" (with Farruko)	2020	—	—	—	—	RIAA: Gold (Latin)	Orgánico
"Desnudarte" (with Jay Wheeler)	2020	—	—	—	—	RIAA: Platinum (Latin)	Deluxe

Notes

- Note 1: Peak prior to being combined with "Asesina" (Remix)
- Note 2: Uses combined chart entries for "Asesina" and "Asesina" (Remix)

==== As featured artist ====
List of singles as featured artist, with selected chart positions
Title	Year	Peak chart positions				Certifications	Album
Title	Year	US Latin	US Latin Digital	ARG	SPA	Certifications	Album
"La Llamada" (Noriel featuring Brytiago)	2016	—	—	—N/a	—		Non-album single
"Tú Me Enamoraste" (Remix) (Lary Over featuring Anuel AA, Bryant Myers, Almighty, and Brytiago)	2016	—	—	—N/a	—	RIAA: Platinum (Latin)	Real Hasta La Muerte: The Mixtape
"Ahora Me Llama" (Remix) (Juhn featuring Bryant Myers, Anonimus, Noriel, Brytiago, and Miky Woodz)	2016	—	—	—N/a	—	RIAA: Gold (Latin)	Non-album single
"La Llamada" (Remix) (Noriel featuring Brytiago, Bryant Myers, Darkiel, and Almighty)	2016	—	—	—N/a	—		Trap Capos: Season 1
"Me Ama Me Odia" (Revol, Ozuna, and Cosculluela featuring Arcángel and Brytiago)	2016	—	—	—N/a	—	RIAA: 4× Platinum (Latin)	Non-album singles
"De Camino a Marte" (Remix) (Bryant Myers featuring Almighty, Juanka, Brytiago, Darkiel, Noriel, and Darell)	2016	—	—	—N/a	—		Non-album singles
"Te Contaron" (Dayme y El High featuring Gaviria, Brytiago, and Alexio)	2016	—	—	—N/a	—		Non-album singles
"Lokita" (Tony Brouzee featuring Brytiago)	2016	—	—	—N/a	—		Non-album singles
"To' te Llueve" (El Sica featuring Arcángel, De La Ghetto, and Brytiago)	2017	—	—	—N/a	—		Non-album singles
"El Gatito De Mi Ex" (Noriel featuring Benny Benni and Brytiago)	2017	—	—	—N/a	—		Non-album singles
"Putero" (Mark B featuring J. Quiles, Kevin Roldán, and Brytiago)	2017	—	—	—N/a	—		Non-album singles
"Me Mata" (Bad Bunny, Mambo Kingz, and DJ Luian featuring Arcángel, Almighty, Bryant Myers, Noriel, Baby Rasta, and Brytiago)	2017	—	—	—N/a	—		Non-album singles
"Hablale" (Remix) (D-Enyel featuring Alexio, Ozuna, Bryant Myers, and Brytiago)	2017	—	—	—N/a	—		Non-album singles
"Jersey" (Remix) (Sou El Flotador featuring Anuel AA, Yomo, Miky Woodz, Noriel, Lito Kirino, Tali, Brytiago, Darkiel, and Gotay)	2017	—	—	—N/a	—		Mr. Fly, Vol. 2
"Dile a Tu Marido" (Remix) (DM featuring Brytiago, Bryant Myers, Eloy, Lary Over, Lyan, Miky Woodz, and Juhn)	2017	—	—	—N/a	—		Non-album singles
"Demonia Baila" (Jantony featuring Bad Bunny and Brytiago)	2017	—	—	—N/a	—		Non-album singles
"Prendelo" (Remix) (Anonimus featuring Lary Over, Ñengo Flow, Darell & Brytiago)	2017	—	—	—N/a	—		Non-album singles
"Dolce" (Anonimus featuring Brytiago, Secreto, Mark B, and El Super Nuevo)	2017	—	—	—N/a	—		Non-album singles
"Masoquismo" (Randy Paris featuring Brytiago)	2017	—	—	—N/a	—		Non-album singles
"La Pistola" (Jantony featuring Bad Bunny, Brytiago, Catalyna, Rafa Pabón, Oniix, Myke Towers, and La Poe)	2017	—	—	—N/a	—		Non-album singles
"Yo Ya Lo Hice" (Sou El Flotador featuring Brytiago and Messiah)	2017	—	—	—N/a	—		Mr. Fly, Vol. 2
"Dinero Fácil" (Dímelo Flow featuring Justin Quiles, Brytiago, and Gigolo y La Exce)	2018	—	—	—N/a	—		Non-album singles
"Explícale" (Remix) (Yandel, Bad Bunny, and Noriel featuring Cosculluela and Brytiago)	2018	—	—	—N/a	—		Non-album singles
"Voy Subiendo" (Rasel featuring Brytiago)	2018	—	—	—N/a	—		Non-album singles
"Ella Fuma" (Plan B featuring Chencho Corleone, Farruko, Darell, and Brytiago)	2018	—	24	33	—	RIAA: Platinum (Latin)	Non-album singles
"A Solas" (Remix) (Lunay, Lyanno, and Anuel AA featuring Brytiago and Alex Rose)	2018	—	9	—	39	RIAA: Platinum (Latin); PROMUSICAE: Platinum	Épico
"Una Mujer" (DJ Nelson featuring De La Ghetto, Darell, and Brytiago)	2019	—	—	—	—		Non-album singles
"Verte Ir" (DJ Luian, Mambo Kingz, and Anuel AA featuring Nicky Jam, Darell, and Brytiago)	2019	17	6	—	5	PROMUSICAE: 2× Platinum	Non-album singles
"105°F Remix" (Kevvo, Farruko, and Chencho Corleone featuring Arcángel, Ñengo Flow, Darell, Myke Towers, and Brytiago)	2019	—	20	—	32	RIAA: 4× Platinum (Latin); PROMUSICAE: Gold	Non-album singles
"Infiel" (Remix) (Eix, Rauw Alejandro, and Noriel featuring Kevvo, Brytiago, and Jay Wheeler)	2020	—	—	—	—		Non-album singles

==== Promotional singles ====
List of promotional singles, showing year released and album name
Title	Year	Album
"Alerta Roja" (Daddy Yankee featuring Zion, Farruko, Nicky Jam, Arcángel, Plan B, De La Ghetto, Cosculluela, Brytiago, Alexio La Bestia, J Balvin, Kafu Banton, Mozart La Para, Secreto, Gente de Zona, and El Micha)	2016	El Disco Duro

=== Other charted and certified songs ===
List of songs, showing year released and album name
Title	Year	Certifications	Album
"Quizás" (with Ozuna and Lunay)	2020	RIAA: Gold (Latin)	Orgánico
"Volver" (with Ovi, Lenny Tavárez and Natanael Cano)	2020	RIAA: Gold (Latin)	Buen Viaje

=== Guest appearances ===
List of non-single guest appearances, showing other artist(s), year released and album name
Title	Year	Other artist(s)	Album
"Una y Mil Maneras"	2016	Darell, Ñengo Flow	La Verdadera Vuelta
"El Zorro"	2018	Lary Over	El Wason BB
"Sé Que Quieres" (Remix)	2018	De La Ghetto, Jon Z, Almighty	Mi Movimiento
"Ta To Gucci" (Remix)	2018	Cauty, Darell, Cosculluela, Rafa Pabön, Chencho Corleone	Cauty VS Young Cauty
