= Herencia de Patrones =

Regional Mexican band

- Origin: Yuba City, California, U.S.
- Genres: Regional Mexican; urban sierreño; trap corridos
- Years active: 2016-present
- Labels: Rancho Humilde; Lumbre Music; HP Records
- Members: Jesús Diego "Jay Dee" Orejel; Raúl Valencia; Omar Ruiz; Uziel "Uzi" Pantoja; Alejandro Carrillo "Alejo HP"

Herencia de Patrones is an American regional Mexican band from Yuba City, California. Formed in 2016, the group consists singer-songwriter Jesús Diego "Jay Dee" Orejel, with Raúl Valencia on backing vocals, Omar Ruiz on bass guitar, and Uziel "Uzi" Pantoja on requinto guitar. The group received popularity through their singles "Cosas de la Clica" and "Ladeando", and are known for being one of the pioneer groups of the trap corridos movement.

== Career ==
Herencia de Patrones released their debut EP Clicka Fija and their first live album En Vivo Desde Wounded in 2018. The EP received popularity and their live shows attracted the attention of Jimmy Humilde, who is the owner of the Rancho Humilde label.

The group signed to Rancho Humilde, where they released their debut studio album Pa Las Vibras at the end of May 2019, which peaked and stood at No. 1 on the Billboard Regional Mexican Albums chart for four weeks, and No. 11 on the Top Latin Albums chart, earning their first chartings on any chart in the United States.

In 2020, Herencia de Patrones released two EPs, Sorry for the Wait and Para Los Que Conocen el Rollo. Both EPs charted on the Regional Mexican Albums chart at number two and the Top Latin Albums chart at number 14. The pair also charted on the Heatseekers Albums chart, peaking at No. 21 and No. 4, respectively. That same year, the group's debut album Pa Las Vibras earned a nomination for Regional Mexican Album of the Year in the 2020 Billboard Latin Music Awards.

In March 2021, Herencia de Patrones joined Cuban rapper Ovi and Mexican singers Natanael Cano and Junior H on "Los 4 Ases", a song which appears in Ovi's album Retumban2. In July 2021, the group released HP Everything, as well as a deluxe version.

The group joined Gera MX and Peso Pluma on "Feria en el Sobre" in 2023.

In 2026, Lead singer Jesús Diego "Jay Dee" Orejel, made his acting debut in the movie CLIKA, along with Uziel "Uzi" Pantoja.

== Discography ==
=== Studio albums ===
List of studio albums, with selected details, chart positions and certifications
Title	Details	Peak chart positions		Certifications
Title	Details	US Latin	MEX Reg.	Certifications
Pa Las Vibras	Released: May 31, 2019; Label: Rancho Humilde, Lumbre Music; Formats: Digital download, streaming	11	1	RIAA: 2× Platinum (Latin)
HP Everything	Released: July 16, 2021; Label: Rancho Humilde; Formats: Digital download, streaming	—	—	RIAA: Gold (Latin)
Sorry for the Wait 2	Released: August 5, 2022; Label: Rancho Humilde; Formats: Digital download, streaming	—	—	
Pa Las Vibras 2	Released: February 16, 2024; Label: Rancho Humilde, HP; Formats: Digital download, streaming	—	—	
El Mundo Es Tuyo (Inspired by the Clika Movie)	Released January 15, 2026; Label: Rancho Humilde, HP Records; Formats: Digital Download, Streaming	–	–	

=== Extended plays ===
List of extended plays, with selected details and chart positions
Title	Details	Peak chart positions			Certifications
Title	Details	US Heat.	US Latin	MEX Reg.	Certifications
Clika Fija	Released: 2018; Label: Self-released; Formats: Digital download, streaming	—	—	—	
Sorry for the Wait	Released: March 13, 2020; Label: Rancho Humilde, Lumbre Music; Formats: Digital download, streaming	21	14	2	RIAA: Platinum (Latin)
Pa Los Que Conocen el Rollo	Released: December 25, 2020; Label: Rancho Humilde, Lumbre Music; Formats: Digital download, streaming	4	14	2	RIAA: 2× Platinum (Latin)

=== Other certified songs ===
List of other certified songs, showing year released and album name
Title	Year	Certifications	Album
"Cosas de la Clika"	2018	RIAA: 8× Platinum (Latin)	Pa Las Vibras
"Los 4 Ases" (with Ovi, Natanael Cano and Junior H)	2021	RIAA: Platinum (Latin)	Retumban2
"Feria en el Sobre" (Gera MX and Peso Pluma)	2023	RIAA: Gold (Latin)	Mustang 65'

=== Guest appearances ===
List of non-single guest appearances, with other performing artists, showing year released and album name
Title	Year	Other artist(s)	Album
"El Capitan"	2020	Natanael Cano	Corazon Tumbado
"En la Movida"	2020	Legado 7	Duetos Con la Clika
"Tiempo de Brillar"	2020	Fuerza Regida	Adicto
"Los 4 Ases (Corrido Tumbado)"	2021	Ovi, Natanael Cano, and Junior H	Retumban2
"Reyes Magos"	2021	Legado 7 and Fuerza Regida	L.A. Lumbre
"Dinero Sobre Amor"	2022	Gera MX	Ahora Tengo Todo Menos a Ti
"Francotirador"	2022	Fuerza Regida and Calle 24	Pa Que Hablen
"Feria en el Sobre"	2023	Gera MX and Peso Pluma	Mustang 65'
"Feria en el Pantalon"	2023	Los Del Puerto	Seguimos Exportando

== Awards and nominations ==
Award	Year	Category	Nominated work	Result	Ref.
Billboard Latin Music Awards	2020	Regional Mexican Album of the Year	Pa Las Vibras	Nominated	
Premios Juventud	2020	Spicy Regional Songs	"Cosas de la Clica"	Nominated	
Premios Lo Nuestro	2022	Top Song — Regional Mexican	"Los 4 Ases (Corrido Tumbado)" (with Ovi, Natanael Cano and Junior H)	Nominated	
