= Bubalu (DJ Luian and Mambo Kingz song) =

"Bubalú"

Single by DJ Luian and Mambo Kingz featuring Anuel AA, Prince Royce and Becky G
- Language: Spanish
- Released: November 6, 2018
- Genre: Latin trap
- Length: 3:48
- Label: Hear This Music; Sony Latin
- Songwriters: Elvin Peña; Francis Diaz; Prince Royce; Héctor Ramos; Henry Pulman; Kedin Maisonet; Mambo Kingz; DJ Luian; Becky G; Anuel AA
- Producers: DJ Luian; Mambo Kingz; Jowny Boom Boom; Hydro

DJ Luian singles chronology
"Curiosidad" (2018)	"Bubalú" (2018)	"Verte Ir" (2019)

Mambo Kingz singles chronology
"Curiosidad" (2018)	"Bubalú" (2018)	"Verte Ir" (2019)

Anuel AA singles chronology
"Ella Quiere Beber" (2018)	"Bubalú" (2018)	"Adictiva" (2018)

Becky G singles chronology
"Booty" (2018)	"Bubalú" (2018)	"Mala Mía (Remix)" (2018)

Prince Royce singles chronology
"Quiero Saber" (2018)	"Bubalú" (2018)	"Adicto" (2018)

Music video
- "Bubalu" on YouTube

"Bubalú" is a song by Puerto Rican producers DJ Luian and Mambo Kingz, featuring Puerto Rican rapper Anuel AA and American singers Prince Royce and Becky G. It was released as a single on November 6, 2018.

== Accolades ==
Year	Awards	Category	Result	Ref.
2020	ASCAP Latin Music Awards	Winning Songs	Won	

== Charts ==
Chart (2018–19)	Peak position
Argentina (Argentina Hot 100)	74
Colombia (National-Report)	33
Dominican Republic (Monitor Latino)	7
Mexico Espanol Airplay (Billboard)	38
Puerto Rico (Monitor Latino)	6
Spain (PROMUSICAE)	12
US Hot Latin Songs (Billboard)	22
US Latin Airplay (Billboard)	31
US Latin Rhythm Airplay (Billboard)	17

== Certifications ==
Region	Certification	Certified units/sales
Spain (Promusicae)	2× Platinum	120,000^{‡}
United States (RIAA)	24× Platinum (Latin)	1,440,000^{‡}
^{‡} Sales+streaming figures based on certification alone.
