= OA (song) =

2023 single by Anuel AA, Quevedo and Maluma

Single by Anuel AA, Quevedo and Maluma featuring Mambo Kingz and DJ Luian
- Released: October 13, 2023
- Genre: Reggaeton
- Length: 3:55
- Label: Hear This Music
- Songwriters: Emmanuel Gazmey Santiago; Pedro Domínguez Quevedo; Juan Luis Londoño Arias; Luian Malavé Nieves; Xavier Semper; Edgar Semper; Eladio Marquez; Kedin Maysonet; Pablo Fuentes
- Producers: DJ Luian; Mambo Kingz

Anuel AA singles chronology
| "Oh Na Na" (2023) | "OA" (2023) | "Luces Tenues" (2023) |

Quevedo singles chronology
| "No Pienso Llamar" (2023) | "OA" (2023) | "Gangster (PQFNEDG)" (2023) |

Maluma singles chronology
| "Si Te Llamo" (2023) | "OA" (2023) | "Maybach (Remix)" (2024) |

Mambo Kingz singles chronology
| "Mejor Que Yo" (2023) | "OA" (2023) | "Mil Palabras" (2024) |

DJ Luian singles chronology
| "Mejor Que Yo" (2023) | "OA" (2023) | "Mil Palabras" (2024) |

Music video
- "OA" on YouTube

"OA" is a song by Puerto Rican rapper Anuel AA, Spanish rapper Quevedo and Colombian singer Maluma featuring Puerto Rican producer duo Mambo Kingz and Puerto Rican DJ and producer DJ Luian. It was released on October 13, 2023, through Hear This Music.

== Background and music video ==
In March 2023, Quevedo was seen hanging with Anuel AA and his workteam (DJ Luian and Mambo Kingz) during the filming of his single with Maluma "Diablo, Que Chimba". Anuel AA also uploaded a video on Instagram singing a cappella of his verse in OA.

The single was leaked one day before its premiere. Quevedo clarified a month later through an interview on Chente Ydrach's podcast the single was scheduled to be released on the same day but due to some error in the launch, the song came out earlier in other countries.

== Commercial performance ==
"OA" did not enter the Hot Latin Songs chart, but peaked at number 36 on the Latin Airplay and at number 14 on the Latin Rhythm Airplay.

In Spain, it debuted at number 10 on the chart dated October 13, 2023, and reached a new peak of 5 on the chart dated October 27, 2023. The song peaked also at number 5 on the Billboard's Spanish Songs chart.

It was later given a 2× Platinum certification from PROMUSICAE.

== Music video ==
OA was released on October 13, 2023, with a music video on Hear This Music's YouTube channel. It was directed by TruViews and got more than 80 million views.

== Charts ==
Chart performance for "OA"
| Chart (2023) | Peak position |
|---|---|
| Dominican Republic (Monitor Latino) | 5 |
| Ecuador Urbano (Monitor Latino) | 12 |
| Spain (PROMUSICAE) | 5 |
| Spain (Billboard) | 5 |
| US Latin Airplay (Billboard) | 36 |
| US Latin Rhythm Airplay (Billboard) | 14 |
| Venezuela Urbano (Monitor Latino) | 10 |

== Certifications ==
Certifications and sales for "OA"
| Region | Certification | Certified units/sales |
|---|---|---|
| Spain (PROMUSICAE) | 3× Platinum | 180,000^{‡} |
| United States (RIAA) | 4× Platinum (Latin) | 240,000^{‡} |
^{‡} Sales+streaming figures based on certification alone.
