= Otro Trago =

- Remix version cover

Single by Sech featuring Darell

from the album Sueños
- Language: Spanish
- English title: "Another Drink"
- Released: 19 April 2019
- Genre: Reggaeton
- Length: 3:45
- Label: Rich
- Songwriters: Sech; Darell
- Producer: Dímelo Flow

Sech singles chronology
"¿Que Más, Pues?" (2019)	"Otro Trago" (2019)	"La Mentira" (2019)

Music video
- "Otro Trago" on YouTube

"Otro Trago" (English: "Another Drink") is a song by Panamanian singer Sech featuring Puerto Rican rapper Darell, released as a single from Sech's debut album Sueños in April 2019 through Rich Music. It reached number one in Sech's native Panama, as well in Spain, Argentina, Peru, Paraguay, Honduras and the Dominican Republic. In the United States, the song debuted at number 100 on the Billboard Hot 100, later peaking at number 34, making Sech's first entry as a solo artist on the chart. Additionally, it became Sech's first chart-topper on the US Hot Latin Songs, making it the first Panamanian artist to reach number one on the chart. On 26 June 2019, a remix featuring Nicky Jam, Ozuna and Anuel AA was released.

== Background ==
After topping the charts in several Spanish-speaking countries with the track, Sech was said to be a "challenger" to "música urbana's mainstays like Bad Bunny and Ozuna".

== Composition and lyrics ==
The song contains "urban fusion melodies" and an "R&B-meets-Reggaeton" beat, with Sech's "soothing vocals" layered on top, while assisted by featured artist Darell's "raspy urban voice". The song, which when translated means "Another Drink", narrates the "story of a girl drinking and dancing her sorrows away at [a] club".

== Critical reception ==
Billboard included the "Otro Trago" remix on their Best Songs of 2019 list, ranking it at number 70, while Complex named the original the 45th best song of 2019.

== Music video ==
The music video premiered on Sech's YouTube channel on 26 April 2019. It currently has over 750 million views as of July 2025.

== Charts ==
=== Weekly charts ===
Chart (2019)	Peak position
Argentina (Argentina Hot 100)	1
Bolivia (Monitor Latino)	3
Chile (Monitor Latino)	2
Colombia Airplay (Monitor Latino)	5
Costa Rica (Monitor Latino)	5
Dominican Republic (Monitor Latino)	1
Ecuador (Monitor Latino)	3
El Salvador (Monitor Latino)	2
France (SNEP)	176
Guatemala (Monitor Latino)	3
Honduras (Monitor Latino)	1
Italy (FIMI)	36
Latin America (Monitor Latino)	1
Mexico Airplay (Billboard)	6
Nicaragua (Monitor Latino)	2
Panama (Monitor Latino)	1
Paraguay (Monitor Latino)	1
Peru (Monitor Latino)	1
Puerto Rico (Monitor Latino)	2
Spain (Promusicae)	1
Sweden (Sverigetopplistan) Remix	96
Switzerland (Schweizer Hitparade)	26
Uruguay (Monitor Latino)	2
US Billboard Hot 100	34
US Hot Latin Songs (Billboard)	1
US Latin Airplay (Billboard)	1
US Latin Rhythm Airplay (Billboard)	1
US Rolling Stone Top 100	56
Venezuela Airplay (Monitor Latino)	2

=== Year-end charts ===
Chart (2019)	Position
Bolivia (Monitor Latino)	14
Colombia Airplay (Monitor Latino)	8
Costa Rica (Monitor Latino)	17
Dominican Republic (Monitor Latino)	3
Ecuador (Monitor Latino)	5
Guatemala (Monitor Latino)	7
Honduras (Monitor Latino)	5
Nicaragua (Monitor Latino)	5
Panama (Monitor Latino)	3
Paraguay (Monitor Latino)	10
Peru (Monitor Latino)	4
Puerto Rico (Monitor Latino)	16
Spain (PROMUSICAE)	13
Switzerland (Schweizer Hitparade)	96
Uruguay (Monitor Latino)	6
US Hot Latin Songs (Billboard)	6
Venezuela Airplay (Monitor Latino)	9

Chart (2020)	Position
Bolivia (Monitor Latino)	62
Ecuador (Monitor Latino)	68
Guatemala (Monitor Latino)	43
Nicaragua (Monitor Latino)	92
Panama (Monitor Latino)	62
Peru (Monitor Latino)	60
US Hot Latin Songs (Billboard)	30
Venezuela Airplay (Monitor Latino)	74

== Certifications ==
Region	Certification	Certified units/sales
Italy (FIMI)	Platinum	50,000^{‡}
Spain (Promusicae)	3× Platinum	120,000^{‡}
United States (RIAA)	42× Platinum (Latin)	2,520,000^{‡}
^{‡} Sales+streaming figures based on certification alone.

== See also ==
- List of Billboard Argentina Hot 100 number-one singles of 2019
- List of number-one singles of 2019 (Spain)
- List of number-one Billboard Hot Latin Songs of 2019
