= Asesina (Brytiago and Darell song) =

2018 single by DJ Luian and Mambo Kingz

Single by Brytiago and Darell
- Language: Spanish
- English title: Killer
- Released: May 11, 2018
- Genre: Reggaeton
- Length: 4:27
- Label: Business Music; El Cartel Records
- Songwriters: Bryan Cancel; Osval Elías Castro; Carlos Ortiz; Carlos Efrén Reyes
- Producer: Nekxum

Brytiago singles chronology
"Bipolar" (2018)	"Asesina" (2018)	"La Mentira" (2018)

Darell singles chronology
"Se Supone (remix)" (2018)	"Asesina" (2018)	"Quiero Hablarte" (2018)

Music video
- "Asesina" on YouTube

"Asesina" (English: "Killer") is a song by Puerto Rican rappers Brytiago and Darell. It was released by Business Music and El Cartel Records as a single on May 11, 2018, for digital download and streaming. The song was written by Brytiago and Darell alongside Puerto Rican producer Chris Jedi and Puerto Rican singer-songwriter Farruko with Nekxum handling the production. An official remix for the song was released with the participation of Puerto Rican singers Daddy Yankee, Ozuna and Anuel AA on October 31, 2018.

== Commercial performance ==
"Asesina" reached the 17th position on the Billboard Hot Latin Songs dated September 8, 2018. The song also peaked at number 14 on Argentina Hot 100 chart dated October 12, 2018. In Spain, it debuted at number 64 on the issue dated June 8, 2018, before reaching the 12th position at its 22nd week on the chart.

== Music video ==
The music video for "Asesina" was released the same day the single was released and was directed by Abez Media. It reached 619 million views on YouTube till 2024.

== Charts ==
Chart performance for "Asesina"
Chart (2018)	Peak position
Argentina Hot 100 (Billboard)	14
Spain (PROMUSICAE)	12
US Hot Latin Songs (Billboard)	17

== Certifications ==
Certifications for "Asesina"
Region	Certification	Certified units/sales
Spain (Promusicae)	4× Platinum	240,000^{‡}
United States (RIAA)	12× Platinum (Latin)	720,000^{‡}
^{‡} Sales+streaming figures based on certification alone.

== Remix ==
"Asesina (remix)"

Single by Brytiago and Darell featuring Daddy Yankee, Ozuna and Anuel AA
- Language: Spanish
- Released: October 31, 2018
- Genre: Reggaeton
- Length: 5:27
- Label: Business Music; Duars Entertainment
- Producers: Criia; Nexkum

Daddy Yankee singles chronology
"Zum Zum (remix)" (2018)	"Asesina (remix)" (2018)	"Adictiva" (2018)

Ozuna singles chronology
"Imposible" (2018)	"Asesina (remix)" (2018)	"Luz Apaga" (2018)

Anuel AA singles chronology
"Que Seria" (2018)	"Asesina (remix)" (2018)	"Ella Quiere Beber" (2018)

Music video
- "Asesina (remix)" on YouTube

On October 31, 2018, an official remix version of the song featuring Puerto Rican singers Daddy Yankee, Ozuna and Anuel AA was released by Business Music and Duars Entertainment and was made available worldwide as a single. In the lyrics, the verses of Brytiago and Darell are the same as the original version, while the verses of the featuring artists describe a woman who gets everything he wants because of the way he captivates everyone. The version runs for a total of 5 minutes and 23 seconds. Daddy Yankee, Ozuna, Anuel AA, Elías de León, Juan Carlos Gómez, Ciian and Sinfónico joined the original version's lyricists to write the remix version. The version runs for a total of 5 minutes and 27 seconds.

=== Commercial performance ===
In the United States, "Asesina (remix)" appeared at number 13 on the Bubbling Under Hot 100 chart on the issue dated December 1, 2018. On the Hot Latin Songs chart, the song peaked at number seven on the chart dated December 1, 2018. On the Argentina Hot 100, it reached the eleventh position.

=== Music video ===
An accompanying music video was released simultaneously with the song. The visual was produced by Sony Music Latin and directed by Marlon Peña. Till 2024, it reached more than 576 million views on Brytiago's Youtube channel.

=== Charts ===
Chart performance for "Asesina (remix)"
Chart (2018)	Peak position
Argentina Hot 100 (Billboard)	11
Mexico Espanol Airplay (Billboard)	30
US Bubbling Under Hot 100 (Billboard)	13
US Latin Airplay (Billboard)	30
US Latin Rhythm Airplay (Billboard)	16
US Hot Latin Songs (Billboard)	7

=== Certifications ===
Certifications for "Asesina (remix)"
Region	Certification	Certified units/sales
United States (RIAA)	4× Platinum (Latin)	240,000^{‡}
^{‡} Sales+streaming figures based on certification alone.
