= Darell (rapper) =

Puerto Rican rapper

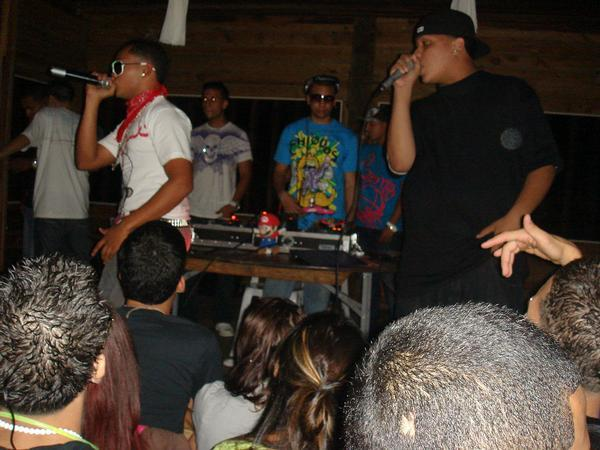
- Darell (right) and Belto (left) performing as a duo

Background information
- Born: Oswaldo Elías Castro Hernández; January 5, 1990 (age 36); Puerto Rico
- Genres: Latin trap; reggaeton; Latin R&B
- Occupations: Rapper; singer; songwriter
- Years active: 2010–present
- Labels: White Lion; Sony Latin

Osvaldo Elías Castro Hernández (born January 5, 1990), better known by the stage name Darell, is a Puerto Rican rapper and songwriter. Born in Puerto Rico, he moved to New York. He is signed to White Lion Records and Sony Music Latin.

== Darell & Belto ==
He met Belto who was also interested in playing music and they formed a duo called Darell & Belto or Belto & Darell in 2010. Their first release was "Entrega a la maldad" followed the same year by "Sateo", "Si te dicen" in 2011 and "De Cali a Medellin" in 2012.

== Solo career ==
Darell also has his own solo career. Very early on he appeared as a solo act in the 2011 album Parandoles La Movie by Pichy Boy & Skaary in the song "Bala" and collaborated in "No quiere compromiso" and "Inmortal", and in 2013 released his solo hit "Despedida de un hermano". In 2014, with La Pompa Music he released a number of hits like "La verdad" in 2014, "La calle esta mala" and "No digas na" in 2015. He continued with La Pompa Music in 2015 and 2016 with "To' el mundo carga un arma", "La noche es larga" and "Liberar el estrés" leaving the label in 2016.

In 2016, he released "Ninguno se monta" establishing himself as a reggaeton and Latin trap artist. His mixtape La Verdadera Vuelta in collaboration with Ñengo Flow, Anuel AA, Tempo, Tali and Lito Kirino was a major success.

He is most famous for the single "Te Boté" (English: "I Dumped You"), a song recorded with Puerto Rican rappers Nio García and Casper Mágico. The song was released by Flow La Movie Inc. as a single on December 1, 2017, for digital download and streaming. On April 13, 2018, a remixed version of the song featuring American artist Nicky Jam and Puerto Rican artists Bad Bunny and Ozuna was released as a single. An English remix of the song by Conor Maynard featuring Anth was released on May 19, 2018. The song ranked at number 1 on the Billboard Hot Latin Songs of Billboard.

In 2018, he participated as a featured artist in Brytiago's hit "Asesina" which was positioned at #50 on Hot Latin Songs. In 2019, he took part in the song "Otro trago" by Sech, that reached number 1 on the US Hot Latin Songs. It was nominated for the Latin Grammy Awards in Best Urban Fusion and Best Song of the Year categories. The song reached number one in Sech's native Panama, as well as in Spain, Argentina, Colombia, Peru, Paraguay, Honduras and Mexico. In the United States, the song peaked at number 34 on the Billboard Hot 100, making Sech's first entry as a solo artist on the chart. A remix featuring Nicky Jam, Ozuna, and Anuel AA was also released.

Darell recorded "Vacía sin mí" in collaboration with Ozuna which was released in 2019. In 2020, Darell released his debut studio album LVV: The Real Rondon. Alternatively known as La Verdadera Vuelta 2, it has collaborations with Ñengo Flow, Miky Woodz, De La Ghetto, Kevvo, Gerardo Ortiz and others.

== Discography ==
=== Studio albums ===
Title	Album details	Peak positions
Title	Album details	SPN
LVV: The Real Rondon	Released: October 22, 2020; Label: Sony Music; Format: Digital download, streaming	50
Everybody Go to the Discotek	Released: July 28, 2023; Label: Sony Music; Format: Digital download, streaming	
Darell 2024	Released: September 20, 2024; Label: Sony Music; Format: Digital download, streaming	

=== Mixtapes ===
Title	EP details
La Verdadera Vuelta	Released: December 16, 2016; Label: White Lion Records; Format: Digital download, streaming

=== Singles ===
==== As lead singer ====
Title	Year	Peak positions										Certifications	Album
Title	Year	CAN	FRA	ITA	MEX	NED	SPN	SWI	US Hot	US Latin Songs	US Latin Airplay	Certifications	Album
"Otra Vez" (with Kelmitt and Bad Bunny)	2016	—	—	—	—	—	—	—	—	—	—		Non-album single
"Real G's" (with Ñengo Flow and Sinfónico featuring Ele A El Dominio and Jon Z)	2017	—	—	—	—	—	—	—	—	—	—	RIAA: Gold (Latin)	Trap Murdaz
"Te Boté" (with Casper Magico and Nio García)	2017	—	52	11	—	53	1	38	—	—	—	FIMI: 3× Platinum; PROMUSICAE: 4× Platinum; RIAA: 3× Platinum (Latin); SNEP: Platinum	Non-album single
"Ojalá" (with Bryant Myers, De La Ghetto and Almighty)	2017	—	—	—	—	—	—	—	—	—	—	RIAA: Gold (Latin)	La Oscuridad
"Quiere Fumar" (with Nio García and Casper Mágico)	2018	—	—	—	—	—	—	—	—	—	—	RIAA: Gold (Latin)	Non-album single
"Se Supone" (Remix) (with Jhay Cortez and Ñengo Flow featuring Miky Woodz, Almighty and Myke Towers)	2018	—	—	—	—	—	—	—	—	—	—	RIAA: Gold (Latin)	Eyez On Me
"Te Boté" (Remix) (with Nio García and Casper Mágico featuring Bad Bunny, Nicky Jam and Ozuna)	2018	98	—	—	—	—	—	—	36	1	2	RIAA: 80× Platinum (Latin)	Now Or Never
"Asesina" (with Brytiago)	2018	—	—	—	—	—	12	—	—	—	—	FIMI: Gold; PROMUSICAE: 3× Platinum; RIAA: 12× Platinum (Latin)	Non-album singles
"Asesina (Remix)" (with Brytiago featuring Daddy Yankee, Ozuna, and Anuel AA)	2018	—	—	—	—	—	—	—	— (Note: "Asesina" did not enter the Billboard Hot 100, but peaked at number 13 on the Bubbling Under Hot 100 chart.)	7	30	RIAA: 4× Platinum (Latin)	Non-album singles
"Quiere Fumar" (Remix) (with Nio García and Casper Mágico featuring Miky Woodz, De La Ghetto and Almighty)	2018	—	—	—	—	—	—	—	—	—	—	RIAA: Gold (Latin)	Non-album singles
"Caliente" (with Farruko)	2019	—	—	—	—	—	44	—	—	—	—	RIAA: Platinum (Latin)	Non-album singles
"Velitas" (with Brytiago)	2019	—	—	—	—	—	22	—	—	—	—	AMPROFON: Platinum+Gold; PROMUSICAE: Platinum	Non-album singles
"B11" (with Rvssian, Zion & Lennox and Myke Towers)	2019	—	—	—	—	—	29	—	—	40	—	PROMUSICAE: Platinum	Non-album singles
"Perreito" (Remix) (with Mariah Angeliq and Arcángel)	2019	—	—	—	—	—	—	—	—	41	—		Normal
"Pronto llegará" (with C. Tangana)	2019	—	—	—	—	—	41	—	—	—	—		Non-album singles
"No vuelvas más"	2019	—	—	—	—	—	60	—	—	—	47	RIAA: Gold (Latin)	Non-album singles
"4K" (with El Alfa and Noriel)	2020	—	—	—	—	—	66	—	—	—	—		Non-album singles
"Llamé Pa' Verte" (with Nio García)	2020	—	—	—	—	—	—	—	—	—	43		Now Or Never
"Olvidando" (with Brytiago)	2020	—	—	—	—	—	—	—	—	—	—	RIAA: Gold (Latin)	Orgánico
"Échalo Pa' Ca" (with Sofia Reyes and Lalo Ebratt)	2020	—	—	—	20	—	—	—	—	—	—		Mal de Amores
"Lollipop" (solo or remix with Ozuna and Maluma)	2023	—	—	—	—	—	2	—	—	26	18	AMPROFON: Gold; PROMUSICAE: 2× Platinum; RIAA: 6× Platinum (Latin); PROMUSICAE: Gold (Remix); RIAA: Gold (Remix) (Latin)	Everybody Go to the Discotek
"—" denotes a recording that did not chart or was not released in that territory.

==== As featured artist ====
Title	Year	Peak positions								Certifications	Album
Title	Year	FRA	ITA	MEX	SPN	SWI	US Hot	US Latin Songs	US Latin Airplay	Certifications	Album
"Me Compré Un Full" (Real G Remix) (Ñengo Flow, Casper Mágico and Sinfónico featuring Mackie, Darell, Jon Z and Ele A el Dominio)	2018	—	—	—	—	—	—	—	—	RIAA: Gold (Latin)	Non-album singles
"Ella Fuma" (Plan B and Chencho Corleone featuring Brytiago, Darell and Farruko)	2018	—	—	—	—	—	—	—	—	RIAA: Platinum (Latin)	Non-album singles
"Pa' la Pared" (Myke Towers featuring Darell)	2018	—	—	—	—	—	—	—	—	RIAA: Gold (Latin)	Non-album singles
"Vacía Sin Mí" (Ozuna featuring Darell)	2019	—	—	—	40	—	—	—	—		Non-album singles
"Verte Ir" (DJ Luian, Mambo Kingz and Anuel AA featuring Nicky Jam, Darell and Brytiago)	2019	—	—	—	5	—	—	17	—	FIMI: Gold; PROMUSICAE: 3× Platinum; RIAA: 2× Diamond (Latin)	Non-album singles
"Otro Trago" (Sech featuring Darell)	2019	176	36	—	1	26	—	—	—	FIMI: Platinum; PROMUSICAE: 3× Platinum; RIAA: 35× Platinum (Latin)	Sueños
"Mírame" (Remix) (Nio García, Rauw Alejandro and Lenny Tavárez featuring Darell, Myke Towers and Casper Mágico)	2019	—	—	—	80	—	—	—	—	RIAA: 4× Platinum (Latin)	Non-album singles
"Otro Trago" (Remix) (Sech featuring Darell, Nicky Jam, Ozuna and Anuel AA)	2019	—	—	6	2	—	34	1	1	PROMUSICAE: 2× Platinum	Non-album singles
"105 F" (Remix) (Farruko, Kevvo and Chencho Corleone featuring Arcángel, Ñengo Flow, Darell, Myke Towers and Brytiago)	2019	—	—	—	32	—	—	—	—	PROMUSICAE: Platinum; RIAA: 4× Platinum (Latin)	Non-album singles
"Wow" (Remix) (Bryant Myers, Nicky Jam and El Alfa featuring Arcángel and Darell)	2020	—	—	—	88	—	—	36	—	RIAA: Gold (Latin)	Non-album singles
"Only Fans" (Remix) (Young Martino, Lunay and Myke Towers featuring Jhay Cortez, Arcángel, Darell, Ñengo Flow, Brray and Joyce Santana)	2020	—	—	—	94	—	—	—	—	RIAA: 2× Platinum (Latin)	Non-album singles
"Aloha" (DJ Luian and Mambo Kingz featuring Maluma, Rauw Alejandro, Beéle and Darell)	2020	—	—	—	11	—	—	49	—	PROMUSICAE: 2× Platinum	Non-album singles
"—" denotes a recording that did not chart or was not released in that territory.
