= Ñengo Flow =

Puerto Rican rapper and singer (born 1981)

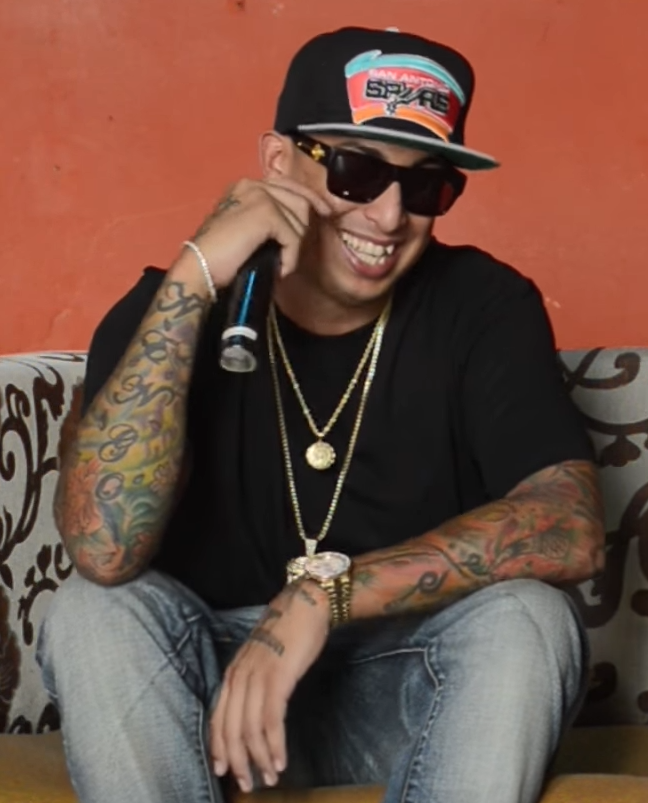
- Ñengo Flow in 2012

Background information
- Also known as: El Real G; El Producto Más Caro
- Born: Edwin Laureano Rosa Vázquez Ortiz; October 15, 1981 (age 45); Río Piedras, Puerto Rico
- Origin: Bayamón, Puerto Rico
- Genres: Reggaeton; Latin hip hop; Latin trap; gangsta rap
- Occupations: Rapper; singer; songwriter
- Years active: 2004–present
- Labels: Cinq; Millones Récords; Full Récords; Real G4 Life; Atlantic Records

Edwin Laureano Rosa Vázquez Ortiz (born October 15, 1981), known professionally as Ñengo Flow, is a Puerto Rican rapper and singer. He was born in San Juan and grew up in Bayamón where he started in the music business. At the age of 14, Ortiz first presented on stage in the neighborhood where he lived in a community movement.

Ñengo Flow is one of the wealthiest reggaeton artists and had a net worth of $8 million in 2017.

== Singing career ==
After a few years, Ortiz became known as Ñengo Flow. His first work as an artist was to release a mixtape with colleagues and friends. He then released his first studio album Flow Callejero in 2005, which featured appearances from Don Omar, Cuban Link, Yomille Omar, Baby Rasta and more guests. He continued to release mixtapes including El Combo Que No Se Deja in 2007 and La Verdadera Calle in 2010. He also appeared on various reggaetón compilation albums including Los Anormales (2004), Sangre Nueva (2005) and DJ Joe – Abusando del Género (2006). In 2011, he launched his álbums Real G4 Life and in 2012 Real G4 Life 2 as well as Real G4 Life 2.5. Real G4 Life 2 reached number 75 on the Billboard Top Latin Albums chart while the 2.5 edition reached number 61 on the same chart. Also in 2012, he appeared on various artists' albums, including Ivy Queen's Musa while also providing uncredited vocals to the song "La Killer".

Ñengo Flow's Real G4 Life concert was nominated for Concert of the Year by the Tu Música Urban Awards in 2019.

== Discography ==
=== Studio albums ===
- 2005: Flow Callejero
- 2011: Real G4 Life
- 2012: Real G4 Life 2
- 2012: Real G4 Life 2.5
- 2017: Real G4 Life 3
- 2020: The Goat
- 2024: Real G4 Life, Vol. 4

=== Other albums ===
- 2008: El Combo Que No Se Deja
- 2015: Los Reyes Del Rap (con Los G4)
