= Eladio Carrión discography =

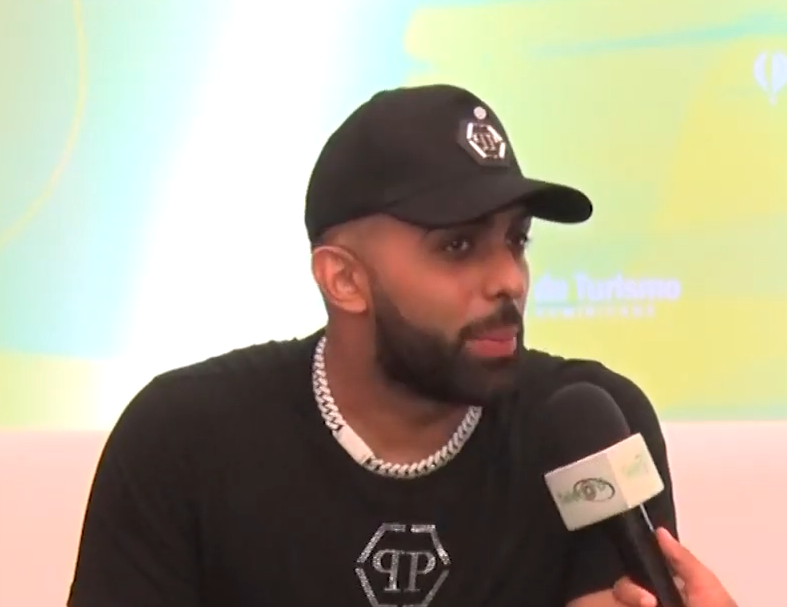
- Carrión being interviewed in 2019
- Studio albums: 7
- EPs: 1
- Singles: —
- Mixtapes: 2
- Reissues: 1

The discography of American rapper Eladio Carrión consists of seven studio albums, one reissue album, one extended play, two mixtapes, and several charted singles.

== Albums ==
=== Studio albums ===
Title	Details	Chart positions			Certifications
Title	Details	US	US Latin	SPA	Certifications
Sauce Boyz	Released: January 31, 2020; Label: Rimas; Formats: Digital download, streaming	—	8	34	RIAA: Platinum (Latin)
Monarca	Released: January 8, 2021; Label: Rimas; Formats: Digital download, streaming	—	11	14	
Sauce Boyz 2	Released: December 2, 2021; Label: Rimas; Formats: Digital download, streaming	92	2	5	PROMUSICAE: Platinum
3men2 Kbrn	Released: March 17, 2023; Label: Rimas; Formats: Digital download, streaming	16	3	1	PROMUSICAE: Gold
Sol María	Released: January 19, 2024; Label: Rimas; Formats: Digital download, streaming	37	6	1	PROMUSICAE: Gold
Don Kbrn	Released: April 3, 2025; Label: Rimas; Formats: Digital download, streaming	32	3	3	
Corsa	Released: April 30, 2026; Label: Rimas; Formats: Digital download, streaming	138	6	—	

=== Reissues ===
Title	Details	Chart positions
Title	Details	SPA
Sauce Boyz Care Package	Released: June 25, 2020; Label: Rimas; Formats: Digital download, streaming	56

== Mixtapes ==
Title	Details	Chart positions		
Title	Details	US	US Latin	SPA
Sen2 Kbrn, Vol. 1	Released: July 2, 2021; Label: Rimas; Formats: Digital download, streaming	—	20	12
Sen2 Kbrn, Vol. 2	Released: November 18, 2022; Label: Rimas; Formats: Digital download, streaming	121	11	1

== Extended plays ==
Title	Details	Chart positions
Title	Details	SPA
Porque Puedo	Released: May 1, 2024; Label: Rimas; Formats: Digital download	18

== Singles ==
List of singles, with selected chart positions, certifications, year released and album name
Title	Year	Peak chart positions					Certifications	Album
Title	Year	US Bub.	US Latin	ARG	SPA	WW	Certifications	Album
"19" (with Jon Z and Myke Towers)	2017	—	—	—	—	—		Non-album singles
"Con las Dos" (featuring Ele A el Dominio)	2017	—	—	—	—	—		Non-album singles
"OG Kush" (with Jon Z)	2017	—	—	—	—	—		Non-album singles
"Ninfomaniaca" (with Andre TG)	2017	—	—	—	—	—		Non-album singles
"Si Tú Te Vas" (with Jon Z)	2018	—	—	—	—	—	RIAA: Gold (Latin)	Non-album singles
"Entre Tantas" (with Lyanno and Brray)	2018	—	—	—	—	—		Non-album singles
"Dame Una Hora" (featuring Amenazzy)	2018	—	—	—	—	—		Non-album singles
"Mi Cubana" (remix) (with Cazzu and KHEA featuring ECKO)	2018	—	—	—	—	—		Non-album singles
"Ave María" (with KHEA and Big Soto featuring Randy)	2018	—	—	—	—	—		Non-album singles
"No Me Vire"	2018	—	—	—	—	—		Non-album singles
"Servicarro de Church" (with Robertito Chong)	2018	—	—	—	—	—		Non-album singles
"Mula" (with Big Soto)	2018	—	—	—	—	—		Non-album singles
"Miles"	2018	—	—	—	—	—		Non-album singles
"Hace Tiempo" (with Seven Kayne and Omar Varela)	2018	—	—	—	—	—		Non-album singles
"Me Usaste" (with KHEA and Noriel featuring Jon Z, ECKO and Juhn)	2018	—	—	—	—	—	RIAA: Gold (Latin)	Non-album singles
"Gracias"	2018	—	—	—	—	—		Non-album singles
"Suerte" (with Toby Letra and Topo Nlaska)	2018	—	—	—	—	—		Non-album singles
"Hola Bebé" (with Bhavi)	2018	—	—	—	—	—		Non-album singles
"Sigue Bailándome" (with Darkiel, Brray, Myke Towers, and Yann'C)	2018	—	—	—	—	—	RIAA: Platinum (Latin)	Non-album singles
"Olvidarte"	2018	—	—	—	—	—		Non-album singles
"Candela" (with ECKO)	2018	—	—	—	—	—		Non-album singles
"Lluvia"	2018	—	—	—	—	—		Non-album singles
"No Stylist" (with Andre TG)	2019	—	—	—	—	—		Non-album singles
"Dice Que No" (with Oken and Darkiel featuring Rauw Alejandro)	2019	—	—	—	—	—		Non-album singles
"Mi Error" (with Zion)	2019	—	—	—	—	—	RIAA: Platinum (Latin)	Non-album singles
"Periódico de Ayer" (with Ñejo)	2019	—	—	—	—	—		Non-album singles
"Se Moja" (with Amenazzy and Rauw Alejandro featuring Noriel)	2019	—	—	—	—	—		Non-album singles
"Mentirte" (remix) (with Jon Z and Ele A el Dominio featuring Randy)	2019	—	—	—	—	—		Non-album singles
"No Podemos" (remix) (with Jon Z and Myke Towers)	2019	—	—	—	—	—		Non-album singles
"Madre Perdóname" (with Subelo NEO and Joyce Santana featuring Ele A el Dominio and Jon Z)	2019	—	—	—	—	—		Non-album singles
"Hoy"	2019	—	—	—	—	—		Non-album singles
"Si Tú Me Quisieras" (with Maikel Delacalle)	2019	—	—	—	—	—		Non-album singles
"Animal" (with Bryant Myers)	2019	—	—	—	—	—		Non-album singles
"Kemba Walker" (with Bad Bunny)	2019	—	—	—	83	—	PROMUSICAE: 3× Platinum; RIAA: 3× Platinum (Latin)	Sauce Boyz
"Arreglamos" (remix) (with Joniel featuring Lary Over, Green Cookie and Myke Towers)	2019	—	—	—	—	—		Non-album singles
"Vivimo Caro" (remix) (with Jose Reyes and Arcángel featuring Jon Z and Duki)	2019	—	—	—	—	—		Non-album singles
"Que Me Importa" (with La Manta)	2019	—	—	—	—	—		Non-album singles
"Salgo a Buscarte" (with Jon Z featuring Ele A el Dominio and Boy Wonder CF)	2019	—	—	—	—	—		Non-album singles
"Sauceboy Freestyle"	2019	—	—	—	—	—		Non-album singles
"Mi Error" (remix) (with Wisin & Yandel and Zion & Lennox featuring Lunay)	2019	—	—	—	100	—	PROMUSICAE: Platinum; RIAA: Platinum (Latin)	Sauce Boyz
"Tussi" (with Arcángel and Justin Quiles featuring De la Ghetto)	2020	—	—	—	24	—	PROMUSICAE: Platinum; RIAA: Gold (Latin)	Los Favoritos 2
"Eladio Carrión: Bzrp Music Sessions, Vol. 40" (with Bizarrap)	2021	—	—	10	15	162	PROMUSICAE: Platinum	Non-album singles
"Habla Claro" (with Morad)	2021	—	—	—	23	—	PROMUSICAE: Platinum	Non-album singles
"Redbull" (with Beny Jr)	2021	—	—	—	86	—	PROMUSICAE: Gold	Non-album singles
"Jovenes Millonarios" (with Myke Towers)	2021	—	44	—	48	—	PROMUSICAE: Platinum	Sauce Boyz 2
"Roto" (with Corina Smith)	2022							Antisocial
"Gucci Fendi" (with Justin Quiles)	2022							Non-album singles
"Nota" (with Nicki Nicole)	2022							Non-album singles
"Nunca y Pico" (with Yandel and Maluma)	2022							Resistencia
"Que Cojones"	2022	—	—	—	70	—	PROMUSICAE: Gold	Non-album singles
"Hola" (with Tokischa)	2022							Non-album singles
"Triste Verano" (with Anuel AA)	2023	—	36	—	22	—	PROMUSICAE: Gold	Non-album singles
"77" (with Peso Pluma)	2023	6	27	—	—	—		Génesis
"Mbappe" (remix) (with Future)	2023	—	—	—	46	—		3men2 Kbrn
"Air France"	2023	—	—	—	99	—		3men2 Kbrn
"6PM en Mallorca"	2023	—	—	—	67	—		Non-album single
"Pa' la Vuelta" (with Morad)	2023	—	—	—	53	—		Non-album single
"Easy" (with Yeruza)	2023	—	—	—	—	—		Coda
"TQMQA"	2023	—	39	—	22	—	PROMUSICAE: Gold	Sol María
"Romeo y Julieta" (with Quevedo)	2025	—	—	—	5	—		Don Kbrn

== Other charted and certified songs ==
List of songs, with selected chart positions, certifications, year released and album name
Title	Year	Peak chart positions					Certifications	Album
Title	Year	US	US Latin	ARG	SPA	WW	Certifications	Album
"North Carolina" (Anuel AA featuring Eladio Carrión)	2021	—	24	—	78	—	* PROMUSICAE: Gold	Las Leyendas Nunca Mueren
"Gladiador"	2022	—	39	—	53	—		Sen2 Kbrn, Vol. 2
"Si la Calle Llama"	2022	—	—	—	42	—		Sen2 Kbrn, Vol. 2
"Mbappé"	2022	—	21	—	12	174	PROMUSICAE: 2× Platinum	Sen2 Kbrn, Vol. 2
"HP Freestyle"	2022	—	—	—	60	—		Sen2 Kbrn, Vol. 2
"Caras Vemos"	2022	—	—	—	38	—		Sen2 Kbrn, Vol. 2
"Hugo"	2022	—	—	—	33	—	PROMUSICAE: Gold	Sen2 Kbrn, Vol. 2
"Te Dijeron"	2022	—	—	—	57	—		Sen2 Kbrn, Vol. 2
"Friends"	2022	—	—	—	69	—		Sen2 Kbrn, Vol. 2
"La Fama"	2022	—	—	—	86	—		Sen2 Kbrn, Vol. 2
"Carta a Dios"	2022	—	—	—	90	—		Sen2 Kbrn, Vol. 2
"Padre Tiempo"	2023	—	—	—	38	—		3men2 Kbrn
"El Hokage"	2023	—	—	—	36	—		3men2 Kbrn
"¿Qué Carajos Quieres Tú Ahora?"	2023	—	—	—	37	—		3men2 Kbrn
"Cuevita"	2023	—	—	—	62	—		3men2 Kbrn
"Coco Chanel" (with Bad Bunny)	2023	87	13	25	2	22	PROMUSICAE: 3× Platinum	3men2 Kbrn
"Si la Calle Llama" (remix) (featuring Myke Towers)	2023	—	40	91	10	89	PROMUSICAE: 2× Platinum	3men2 Kbrn
"Peso a Peso" (with Quavo and Rich the Kid featuring Ñengo Flow)	2023	—	—	—	54	—		3men2 Kbrn
"Mala Mía Otra Vez"	2023	—	—	—	69	—		3men2 Kbrn
"Friends" (remix) (with Lil Tjay and Luar la L)	2023	—	—	—	60	—		3men2 Kbrn
"Quizás, Tal Vez"	2023	—	—	—	81	—		3men2 Kbrn
"M3" (with Fivio Foreign)	2023	—	—	—	95	—		3men2 Kbrn
"Betty" (with Hydro and SHB)	2023	—	—	—	59	—		3men2 Kbrn
"Andando" (with Morad and Beny Jr.)	2023	—	—	—	37	—	PROMUSICAE: Gold	Reinsertado
"Thunder y Lightning" (with Bad Bunny)	2023	80	23	—	15	49	PROMUSICAE: Gold	Nadie Sabe Lo Que Va a Pasar Mañana
"Bendecido"	2024	—	49	—	17	—		Sol María
"La Canción Feliz del Disco" (with Milo J)	2024	—	—	—	36	—		Sol María
"Sonrisa"	2024	—	—	—	52	—		Sol María
"Sigo Enamorau'" (with Yandel)	2024	—	—	—	40	—		Sol María
"Tu Ritmo"	2024	—	—	—	47	—		Sol María
"Hey Lil Mama" (with Rauw Alejandro)	2024	—	36	—	9	—	PROMUSICAE: Gold	Sol María
"Tranquila Baby"	2024	—	—	—	71	—		Sol María
"Tanta Droga" (with Arcángel and De la Ghetto)	2024	—	—	—	54	—		Sol María
"El Malo" (with Sech)	2024	—	—	—	21	—		Sol María
"Fé, Cojones y Paciencia"	2024	—	—	—	86	—		Sol María
"Todo Lit" (with Duki)	2024	—	—	—	58	—		Sol María
"Mencionar"	2024	—	—	—	90	—		Sol María
"RKO"	2024	—	—	—	41	—		Sol María
"Luchas Mentales"	2024	—	—	—	88	—		Sol María
"Mama's Boy" (with Nach)	2024	—	—	—	64	—		Sol María
"Si Si Si Si" (Dímelo Flow, Sech, Dalex, Justin Quiles and Lenny Tavárez featuring Eladio Carrión, Bryant Myers and Dei V)	2024	—	—	—	10	—		The Academy: Segunda Misión
"Vetements" (with Myke Towers)	2025	—	—	—	12	—		Don Kbrn
"El Reggaetón del Disco" (with Cris MJ)	2025	—	—	—	20	—		Don Kbrn
"Me Muero" (with Lia Kali)	2025	—	—	—	51	—		Don Kbrn
"100 Conmigo"	2025	—	—	—	56	—		Don Kbrn
"Ohtani"	2025	—	—	—	61			Don Kbrn
"Invencible"	2025	—	—	—	66	—		Don Kbrn
"Broly (with Neutro Shorty)	2025	—	—	—	67	—		Don Kbrn
"Tiffany (with Peso Pluma)	2025	—	—	—	77	—		Don Kbrn
"Piedras en la Ventana"	2025	—	—	—	90	—		Don Kbrn
"Ricky Bobby"	2026	—	—	—	31	—		
