= Pacto =

Pacto may refer to:

- Pacto de Olivos, series of documents signed by president Carlos Menem of Argentina and Raúl Alfonsín
- Pacto de Punto Fijo, accord between Venezuelan political parties
- Pacto de Sangre (album), studio album released by norteño ensemble Los Tigres del Norte
- Pacto Federal, treaty signed by the Argentine provinces of Buenos Aires, Entre Ríos and Santa Fe in 1831
- Pacto (song), a song released by Jay Wheeler
