= Rayo (album) =

2024 studio album by J Balvin

Studio album by J Balvin
- Released: 9 August 2024
- Genre: Reggaeton
- Length: 47:53
- Language: Spanish
- Label: Capitol

J Balvin chronology
Jose (2021)	Rayo (2024)	Mixteip (2025)

Singles from Rayo
- 1. "En Alta" Released: 23 June 2023; 2. "Polvo de Tu Vida" Released: 7 June 2024; 3. "Gaga" Released: 11 July 2024; 4. "Doblexxó" Released: 8 August 2024

Rayo is the sixth studio album by Colombian singer J Balvin. It was released on 9 August 2024, through Capitol Records. It contains guest appearances from Chencho Corleone, Luar la L, Feid, Saiko, Bad Gyal, Zion, Dei V, Ryan Castro, Blessd, Carín León, Omar Courtz, Yovngchimi, Quevedo, Mambo Kingz and DJ Luian.

== Background ==
In a July 2023 interview with Nylon, Balvín revealed that he would release his seventh overall studio album later that year, which would have contained mainly reggaeton and Afrobeats tracks, as well as electronic dance songs. He stated that he would promote the album with "Click, Click, Flash", which remains unreleased, and "Dientes" with DJ Khaled and Usher which is inspired by the latter's hit single "Yeah!". That same year, he revealed that he was working on a collaborative album with English singer Ed Sheeran. In July 2024, he would reveal the album's title as Rayo, which is an "expression" for "earnest need for human connection that drove Balvín to create an album that feels more like a house party than a collection of songs". The album's track list was also revealed in the same month.

== Singles ==
"En Alta" was released on 23 June 2023 was released as the lead single for Rayo. It peaked at number 63 on Spain's song chart. "Polvo de Tu Vida" with Chencho Corleone was released on 7 June 2024, as the album's second single. "Gaga" with Saiko was released as the album's third single on 11 July 2024. It peaked at number 45 in Spain. "Doblexxó" with Feid was released on 8 August 2024 as the fourth single from Rayo.

== Critical reception ==
Thania Garcia of Variety described the album as a "a pretty polished collection of pop and reggaeton" and that " there isn’t anything on Rayo that feels like a waste time, either", even if "the lyrical material is less vulnerable and personal" than the previous record projects. Billboard wrote that the album has "the rhythmic-leaning sound that made Balvin a household name in the first place" and it "takes listeners on a joyride, where he often detours from reggaetón to arrive at dembow, house music or electro-pop".

== Track listing ==
Rayo track listing
No.	Title	Length
1.	"Cosa de Locos"	2:36
2.	"Polvo de Tu Vida" (with Chencho Corleone)	2:52
3.	"Swat" (with Luar la L)	3:27
4.	"Bajo y Batería"	3:21
5.	"Doblexxó" (with Feid)	2:56
6.	"3 Noches"	3:33
7.	"Gaga" (with Saiko)	3:08
8.	"Gato" (with Bad Gyal)	3:12
9.	"Lobo" (with Zion)	2:36
10.	"La Noche" (with Dei V)	2:55
11.	"Origami" (with Ryan Castro and Blessd)	3:28
12.	"Sólido"	3:24
13.	"Stoker" (with Carín León)	3:24
14.	"Ganster"	2:51
15.	"En Alta" (with Omar Courtz, Yovngchimi and Quevedo featuring Mambo Kingz and DJ Luian)	4:10
Total length:		47:53

== Charts ==
Chart performance for Rayo
Chart (2024)	Peak position
Portuguese Albums (AFP)	174
Spanish Albums (PROMUSICAE)	6
Swiss Albums (Schweizer Hitparade)	39
US Top Latin Albums (Billboard)	13
US Latin Rhythm Albums (Billboard)	5

== Certifications ==
Certifications for Rayo
Region	Certification	Certified units/sales
United States (RIAA)	Gold (Latin)	30,000^{‡}
^{‡} Sales+streaming figures based on certification alone.
