= El Cantante del Ghetto =

Studio album by Ryan Castro
- Released: May 9, 2024
- Recorded: 2023–2024
- Genre: Reggaeton; Latin trap; pop; salsa
- Length: 53:51
- Label: Sony Music Latin
- Producer: COQE; Jhon El Diver; Dímelo Flow; SOG; Taiko; Loud; Cornetto; Astro; Chain trackz; Fenix The Producer; Rvssian; SkipOnDaBeat; Arnold Gutiérrez; CRVS Serrano; Ily Wonder

Ryan Castro chronology
Los Piratas (2022)	El Cantante del Ghetto (2024)

Singles from El Cantante del Ghetto
- 1. "Ghetto Star" Released: January 19, 2023; 2. "Quema" Released: July 13, 2023; 3. "Rich Rappers" Released: March 22, 2024; 4. "El Cantante del Ghetto "La Salsa"" Released: April 17, 2024; 5. "Pueblo de Medallo" Released: May 9, 2024

El Cantante del Ghetto is the debut studio album by Colombian singer Ryan Castro. The album was released on May 9, 2024, through Sony Music Latin. It contains guest appearances from COQE, La Eterna, Arcángel, SOG, Yandel, Jowell & Randy, Onyl, Blessd, Zion, Peso Pluma, Ñengo Flow, Myke Towers, Natan & Shander, Akapellah, Totoy el Frio, and Rich the Kid.

== Background and release ==
After releasing singles including "Jordan", "Monastery" and "Mujeriego", and two EPs in 2022, at the beginning of 2024 Castro announced through his social networks and WhatsApp channel that his debut album was going to be released that year. Since then, he showed on his networks producing new music, deciding what to include and what not to.

Later, Castro sent a profile photo of the album and told his followers that they put it as their profile photo and that if most of them had it he would reveal the cover and track listing. Finally, on April 16, 2024, the singer announced the album's release date, cover art, and track listing, and the next day along with the release of his song of the same name from the album called "La Salsa".

== Singles ==
"Ghetto Star" featuring producer COQE was released as the first single from the album on January 19, 2023. Months later, it was preceded by the second single "Quema" with the Mexican Peso Pluma and the Colombian producer SOG, released on July 13. On March 22, 2024, the third single "Rich Rappers" with the American rapper Rich the Kid was released. Almost a month later, to promote the album, on April 17, a fourth single titled "El Cantante del Ghetto" was released with producers COQE and La Eterna, the same name as the album, and also known as "La Salsa" for its musical genre. On May 9, along with the release of the album, the fifth single "Pueblo de Medallo" was released featuring American singer Arcángel.

== Track list ==
El Cantante del Ghetto track listing
No.	Title	Writer(s)	Producer(s)	Length
1.	"El Cantante del Ghetto" (with COQE and La Eterna)	Bryan David Castro Sosa • Juan Fernando Vélez Adarve • Daniel Pineda Foronda • Santiago Lopera Montoya • Andrés Felipe Agudelo Franco • Davkd Andrés Montoya García • Andrés Felipe Vélez Bolívar • Mateo Alexander Montoya Mazo • Santiago Cárdenas Daza • David Gutiérrez Vélez • Sebastián Camilo León Ramírez • Francisco Javier Castaño Sánchez	COQE	3:26
2.	"Pueblo de Medallo" (with Arcángel)	Bryan David Castro Sosa • Austín Agustín Santos • Jonathan Jacob Reyes • Jorge Valdes • Johnny Oscar López • Ramses Ivan Herrera • Carlos Humberto Domínguez • Santiago Orrego Gallego	Dímelo Flow • Jhon El Diver	3:29
3.	"NCA" (with SOG)	Bryan David Castro Sosa • Santiago Orrego Gallego	SOG	2:43
4.	"Gata G"	Bryan David Castro Sosa • Nicolás Jaña • Andrés Jael Correa Ríos • Kevyn Mauricio Cruz Moreno • Edgar Barrera	Taiko	2:44
5.	"Maleante" (featuring Yandel)	Bryan David Castro Sosa • Llandel Veguilla Malavé • Nicolás Jaña • Andrés Jael Correa Ríos • Edgar Barrera	Taiko	3:18
6.	"Freski" (with SOG)	Bryan David Castro Sosa • Santiago Orrego Gallego	SOG	2:24
7.	"Fendi" (with Jowell & Randy)	Bryan David Castro Sosa • Santiago Carvajal • Carlos Andrés Valencia Vallejo • Joel Alexis Muñoz Martínez • Randy Ariel Ortíz Acevedo • Christian Serna Rodríguez • Sara Agudelo Restrepo • Andrés Goma González • Nicolás David López Sandoval • Hugo Esteban Tobon Betancur	Cornetto • Loud • Astro	2:54
8.	"Modelito" (with Onyl)	Bryan David Castro Sosa • Santiago Orrego Gallego • Sergio Andrés Duque Higuita	SOG	2:48
9.	"Big Dreams"	Bryan David Castro Sosa • Santiago Orrego Gallego	SOG	1:55
10.	"Envigado" (with Blessd and Zion)	Bryan David Castro Sosa • Stiven Mesa Londoño • Félix Gerardo Ortíz Torres • Santiago Orrego Gallego	SOG	3:41
11.	"Quema" (with Peso Pluma and SOG)	Bryan David Castro Sosa • Hassan Emilio Kabande Laija • Santiago Orrego Gallego	SOG	2:31
12.	"Jordan (Remix)" (with Ñengo Flow and Myke Towers)	Bryan David Castro Sosa • Edwin Rosa Vázquez • Michael Anthony Torres Monge • Daniel Pineda Foronda • Santiago Orrego Gallego	COQE • SOG	4:30
13.	"Nada Cambió"	Bryan David Castro Sosa • Santiago Orrego Gallego	SOG	2:33
14.	"Mi Diabla y Mi Diosa" (with Natan & Shander)	Bryan David Castro Sosa • Santiago Orrego Gallego • Camilo Chahin • Natanael Baena Vergara • Alexander Baena Vergara	SOG • Chain Trackz	3:08
15.	"Los Capos" (with Akapellah and Totoy el Frío)	Bryan David Castro Sosa • Santiago Orrego Gallego • Daniel Pineda Foronda • Pedro Elías Aquino • Fabrizzio Hernández Dovalle • Juan David Lujan Torres • Douglas José Hernández Manzano	SOG • COQE • Fenix The Producer	3:11
16.	"XL"	Bryan David Castro Sosa • Tarik Luke Johnston • Simón Restrepo	Rvssian	2:05
17.	"Rich Rappers" (with Rich the Kid)	Bryan David Castro Sosa • Dimitri Leslie Roger • Edgar Barrera • Arnold Gutiérrez • Christian Luis Colón	SkipOnDaBeat • CRVS Serrano • Arnold Gutiérrez	3:15
18.	"Ghetto Star" (with COQE)	Bryan David Castro Sosa	COQE • Andrés Uribe Marín • Ily Wonder	3:16
Total length:				53:51

== Charts ==
Chart performance for El Cantante del Ghetto
Chart (2024)	Peak position
Spanish Albums (PROMUSICAE)	43
US Latin Rhythm Albums (Billboard)	17
US Top Latin Albums (Billboard)	38

== Certifications ==
Certifications for El Cantante del Ghetto
Region	Certification	Certified units/sales
United States (RIAA)	2× Platinum (Latin)	120,000^{‡}
^{‡} Sales+streaming figures based on certification alone.
