= The Monastery =

The Monastery may refer to:

== Arts and entertainment ==
- The Monastery: A Romance, a historical novel by Walter Scott
- The Monastery (Prilepin novel), 2014
- The Monastery (TV series), a 2005 British reality television series
- The Monastery: Mr. Vig and the Nun, a 2006 Danish documentary film

== Buildings ==
- The Monastery (Philadelphia, Pennsylvania), a historic house
- The Monastery (community center), a church in Seattle 1977–1985
- Ad Deir ('The Monastery'), at Petra, Jordan

== See also ==
- Monastery
- Monastery (song)
- The Monastery of Love, a 14th century Germanic poem
- The Monastery of Santa Chiara, a 1949 Italian war film
- The Monastery of Sendomir, a 1920 Swedish drama film
