= Omertà (J Balvin and Ryan Castro album) =

2026 collaborative album by J Balvin and Ryan Castro

Studio album by J Balvin and Ryan Castro
- Released: May 7, 2026
- Genres: Reggaeton, Latin trap, urban
- Language: Spanish
- Labels: Colombia Records, Roc Nation

Omertà is a collaborative studio album by Colombian artists J Balvin and Ryan Castro. It was released on May 7, 2026, through Colombia Records and Roc Nation.

The album marks the first full-length collaborative project between the two artists.

== Background and release ==
J Balvin and Ryan Castro announced Omertà in 2026 following previous collaborations between the two artists.

In an interview with Billboard, the artists described the album as inspired by themes of loyalty, Medellín culture, and creative partnership.

The album was released on May 7, 2026, coinciding with J Balvin's birthday.

== Composition ==
Omertà incorporates elements of reggaeton, Latin trap, and hip hop.

The project was described by music writer Eric Alper as a "coded world from Medellín's streets" centered around themes of loyalty and identity.

== Track listing ==
Standard edition
No.	Title	Length
1.	"Una A La Vez"
2.	"Dalmation"
3.	"Melo"
4.	"GWA" (featuring Eladio Carrión)
5.	"Medetown"
6.	"Bengalí"
7.	"Pal Agua"
8.	"Viernes"
9.	"Tonto" (featuring DJ Snake)
10.	"Omertà"
