= Saiko (singer) =

Spanish singer (born 2002)

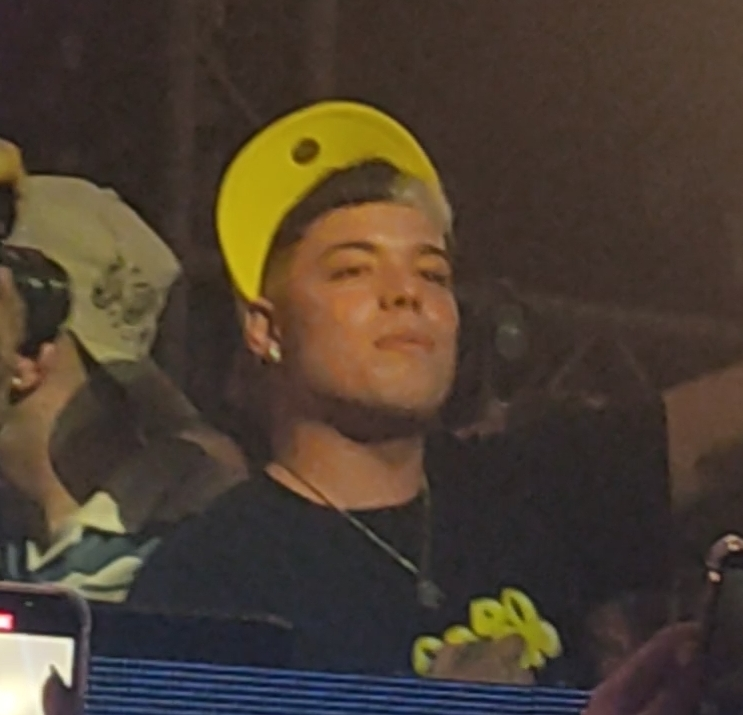
- Saiko during a performance at the Granada 10 nightclub in 2023

Background information
- Born: Miguel Cantos Gómez; 25 May 2002 (age 24); Armilla, Andalusia, Spain
- Genres: Reggaeton; trap
- Occupations: Singer; songwriter
- Instrument: Vocals
- Years active: 2020–present
- Labels: Warner Spain; La Industria; Sony Latin

Miguel Cantos Gómez (born 25 May 2002), known mononymously as Saiko, is a Spanish singer and songwriter in the reggaeton and trap genres.

== Early life ==
Miguel Cantos Gómez was born in Armilla a suburb of Granada, on 25 May 2002. From a very young age he became interested in music, participating in rap battles in his town. He began rapping at the age of fourteen, forming a duo with his brother in 2017.

== Musical career ==
In 2020, Saiko began his solo career. His first single was released under the name "Te quiero fuera". It was not until the release of "Polaris" in 2022 when the artist from Granada became famous, despite having previously collaborated with artists such as Lola Índigo and Alejo in "Humedad" (remix) or with Quevedo in "Jordan I" or in "Turbulencias", the latter together with other artists such as Juseph, Fabio Colloricchio or La Pantera, and with Kabasaki as producer. Polaris was a huge success, which was certified gold in Spain.

Once Saiko achieved the gold record, in April 2023 he released a new single entitled "Supernova", which quickly became very famous as its chorus was that of the song "Un violinista en tu tejado" by Melendi, reaching number 1 on the singles chart in Spain. He also achieved gold record "Las Bratz" (remix), in a single in which he collaborated with JC Reyes, or Juseph, Aissa Aslani, El Bobe and Nickzzy. Once Saiko saw the success of "Polaris" he released "Polaris" (remix) in which he collaborated with Quevedo, Mora and Feid, all artists already established in the genre.. As expected, the song becomes one of the songs of the summer of 2023. Such the success of "Polaris" (remix), Saiko established himself in the industry, collaborating with Omar Montes in "Arena y Sal", with Mora and Sech in "Café Malibú", and again with Mora in "Reina", a single from the Puerto Rican's new album, which soon became number 1 in Spain, debuting in the Spotify top 50 directly as number 1 and number 15 globally.

On 14 September, Saiko gave a free concert with Quevedo in Madrid, and on 21 September, he gave a concert at the Granada Bullring, selling out all tickets in just five minutes. That same day he released the single "Buenas" with Quevedo, which quickly reached number 1 in Spain. On 14 December 2023, Saiko released his EP Saliendo del Planeta with singles such as "Corleone" with Yandel and production by producer Sky, as well as the single "Siempre vas a volver" with Polimá Westcoast, Saiko would define the project as a preview of his next album "Sakura".

Through an Instagram post, Saiko announced on the tracklist of his first album, Sakura, on 17 April 2024. On the same day, he released the video clip for one of the new songs on the album: "Yo lo soñé" with Omar Montes and the participation of Ilia Topuria. Sakura was released on 26 April on all platforms. In total it includes 16 songs, including collaborations with artists such as J Balvin, Bryant Myers, JC Reyes, Dei V, Mora and Dellafuente, among others. Dellafuente's being the most important for him on a sentimental level due to everything that has followed the singer.

== Discography ==
=== Albums ===
List of albums, with selected chart positions
Title	Album details	Peak chart positions	Certifications
Title	Album details	SPA	Certifications
Sakura	Released: 26 April 2024; Labels: Self-released; Format: Digital download, streaming	1	PROMUSICAE: Gold
Natsukashii Yoru	Released: 19 June 2025; Labels: La Industria, Sony Latin; Format: Digital download, streaming	7	

=== Extended plays ===
List of extended plays, with selected chart positions
Title	Album details	Peak chart positions
Title	Album details	SPA
Saliendo del Planeta	Released: 22 December 2023; Labels: Self-released; Format: Digital download, streaming	10

=== Singles ===
==== As lead artist ====
List of singles as lead artist, with selected chart positions
Title	Year	Peak chart positions	Certifications	Album
Title	Year	SPA	Certifications	Album
"Cosas Que No Te Dije"	2021	15	PROMUSICAE: 3× Platinum	Non-album singles
"Polaris" (with Came Beats)	2022	29	PROMUSICAE: Platinum	Non-album singles
"Tuenti" (remix) (with Raul Clyde)	2022	88	PROMUSICAE: Platinum	Non-album singles
"Sikora" (with The Prodiguez)	2023	42	PROMUSICAE: Platinum	Non-album singles
"Las Bratz" (remix) (with Aissa and JC Reyes featuring Nickzzy, El Bobe, Juseph and GIO)	2023	30	PROMUSICAE: 2× Platinum	Non-album singles
"Supernova"	2023	1	PROMUSICAE: 5× Platinum	Sakura
"Arena y Sal" (with Omar Montes and Tunvao)	2023	6	PROMUSICAE: 4× Platinum	Non-album singles
"Polaris" (remix) (with Quevedo and Feid featuring Mora)	2023	1	PROMUSICAE: 6× Platinum	Sakura
"Café Malibú" (with Sech and Mora)	2023	13	PROMUSICAE: Platinum	El Broke Hills
"Antidepresivos"	2023	18	PROMUSICAE: 2× Platinum	Non-album singles
"Carnet" (with Caleb Calloway)	2023	78	PROMUSICAE: Gold	Non-album singles
"Te Menti" (with Ozuna and Ovy on the Drums)	2023	31	PROMUSICAE: Gold	Non-album singles
"Buenas" (with Quevedo)	2023	1	PROMUSICAE: 3× Platinum	Non-album singles
"Una Bachata" (with Lola Indigo)	2024	9	PROMUSICAE: Platinum	GRX
"Desataaa" (with Ovy on the Drums and Myke Towers)	2024	6	PROMUSICAE: Platinum	Cassette 01
"Bahamas" (with Manuel Turizo)	2024	55		Non-album singles
"Yo Lo Soñé" (with Omar Montes)	2024	3	PROMUSICAE: Platinum	Sakura
"3 Caídas"	2024	22		Sakura
"Nana del Hilo Rojo" (with Sky Rompiendo)	2024	28		Sakura
"Ángel de la Guarda (Póstumo)"	2024	97		Sakura
"Perros&Gata$" (with Nicki Nicole)	2024	33		Non-album singles
"Gaga" (with J Balvin)	2024	45		Rayo
"Eroticaaaaaaa" (with Gonzy)	2024	43		Rayo
"Lokenecesitas" (with Omar Courtz)	2025	8		Non-album singles
"Duro Ma" (with Bryant Myers and Dei V)	2025	28		Non-album singles
"PaToLasGyales" (with Chencho Corleone)	2026	48	Los Angelitos	

==== As featured artist ====
List of singles as featured artist, with selected chart positions
Title	Year	Peak chart positions	Certifications	Album
Title	Year	SPA	Certifications	Album
"Arena y Sal" (remix) (Omar Montes, Anitta and Sech featuring Yandel, Saiko, FMK, Lit Killah and Tunvao)	2023	75		Non-album singles

=== Other charted songs ===
List of other charted songs, with selected chart positions, showing year released and album name
Title	Year	Peak chart positions	Certifications	Album
Title	Year	SPA	Certifications	Album
"Reina" (with Mora)	2023	1	PROMUSICAE: 4× Platinum	Estrella
"Corleone" (with Yandel)	2023	16	PROMUSICAE: Gold	Saliendo del Planeta
"Extasisssssss"	2023	3	PROMUSICAE: Gold	Saliendo del Planeta
"Feliz Navidad"	2023	91		Saliendo del Planeta
"XXX_Rosario_XXX"	2023	28		Saliendo del Planeta
"Luna" (with Dellafuente)	2024	13		Sakura
"Boreal" (with Sky Rompiendo)	2024	40		Sakura
"Hey BB"	2024	34		Sakura
"Como Suenan las Estrellas"	2024	27		Sakura
"Cometa Halley" (with J Balvin)	2024	26		Sakura
"La Rijana" (with Caleb Calloway)	2024	79		Sakura
"Eskeleto" (with Bryant Myers)	2024	12	PROMUSICAE: Gold	Sakura
"Badgyal" (with JC Reyes and Dei V)	2024	1	PROMUSICAE: 3× Platinum	Sakura
"Finales de Agosto"	2024	66		Sakura
