= Pacto (song) =

2023 single by Jay Wheeler, Dei V, and Hades 66

Single by Jay Wheeler, Dei V, and Hades66 featuring Luar la L

from the album Emociones 1.5
- Language: Spanish
- English title: "Pact"
- Released: April 25, 2023
- Genre: Latin trap; Latin R&B
- Length: 4:43
- Label: Linked; Dynamic; Empire
- Songwriters: José Ángel López Martínez; David Gerard Rivera Juarbe; Ángel Yamil Santiago Vázquez; Raúl Armando del Valle Robles; Andrés Jesé Gavillán Batista; Ronniel Oneill Collazo Montes
- Producers: Botlok; Yeziell Yeziell; Diemlo Siru; DJ Nelson

Jay Wheeler singles chronology
"Olvidarme de Ti" (2023)	"Pacto" (2023)	"Multiverso" (2023)

Dei V singles chronology
"G Spot" (2023)	"Pacto" (2023)	"Triple H" (remix) (2023)

Hades66 singles chronology
"Diabla" (2023)	"Pacto" (2023)	"Gucci Prada" (2023)

Luar la L singles chronology
"+HP" (2023)	"Pacto" (2023)	"Mi Vicio" (remix) (2023)

Music video
- "Pacto" on YouTube

"Pacto" (transl. "Pact") is a song by the Puerto Rican singers Jay Wheeler, Dei V and Hades66 featuring Luar la L, released on April 25, 2023, as the fourth single from Wheeler's third album Emociones 1.5. The song was remixed by Anuel AA and Bryant Myers with no featured guest, released on July 28.

== Composition and music video ==
The song is described as a sultry Latin trap about two people who have crazy sexual chemistry. The music video of "Pacto" was released on April 24, 2023, on Jay Wheeler's YouTube channel simultaneously with his album Emotiones 1.5.

== Charts ==
Weekly chart performance for "Pacto"
Chart (2023)	Peak position
Spain (Promusicae)	42

== Certifications ==
Certifications and sales for "Pacto"
Region	Certification	Certified units/sales
Spain (Promusicae)	Gold	30,000^{‡}
^{‡} Sales+streaming figures based on certification alone.

== Remix ==
"Pacto (Remix)"

Single by Jay Wheeler, Anuel AA and Hades66 featuring Bryant Myers and Dei V

from the album TRAPii
- Language: Spanish
- Released: July 28, 2023
- Genre: Latin trap
- Length: 5:46
- Label: Linked Music; Dynamic Records; Empire
- Songwriters: José Ángel López Martínez; Emmanuel Gazmey Santiago; Bryant Myers; David Gerard Rivera Juarbe; Angel Yamil Santiago Vazquez; Raúl Armando del Valle Robles; Andrés Jesé Gavillán Batista; Ronniel Oneill Collazo Montes; Alvin Baez
- Producers: Botlok; Yeziell Yeziell; Dimelo Siru; DJ Nelson

Anuel AA singles chronology
"Mejor Que Yo" (2023)	"Pacto (Remix)" (2023)	"Corazón Roto, Pt. 3" (2023)

Bryant Myers singles chronology
"Tweet" (2023)	"Pacto (Remix)" (2023)	"After Party (Remix)" (2023)

Music video
- "Pacto (Remix)" on YouTube

A remix featuring Anuel AA and Bryant Myers was released on July 28, 2023, with a music video on Jay Wheeler's Youtube channel as the debut single of his eight studio album "TRAPPii".

=== Background and release ===
After the release of "Pacto", an Anuel AA AI-made remix of the song became popular on social media. It inspired both Jay Wheeler and Anuel AA to make it happen. Later Wheeler announced that the remix will come out at the end of July, However, Luar la L didn't appear in the remix.

=== Charts ===
Chart performance for "Pacto (Remix)"
Chart (2023)	Peak position
Chile (Billboard)	20
Colombia (Billboard)	20
Ecuador (Billboard)	25
Global 200 (Billboard)	168
Spain (PROMUSICAE)	29
US Hot Latin Songs (Billboard)	29
US Latin Digital Song Sales (Billboard)	11

== Certifications ==
Certifications and sales for "Pacto (Remix)"
Region	Certification	Certified units/sales
Spain (Promusicae)	Platinum	60,000^{‡}
^{‡} Sales+streaming figures based on certification alone.
