= Toki (song) =

Single by Casper Mágico, Anuel AA, Luar la L and iZaak
- Language: Spanish
- Released: May 3, 2024
- Genre: Latin trap; Latin R&B
- Length: 4:44
- Label: Los Mágicos; GLAD Empire
- Producer(s): J Castle

Casper Mágico singles chronology
"Suena el Bajo" (2024)	"Toki" (2024)	"Un Zippy" (2024)

Anuel AA singles chronology
"Killerito" (2024)	"Toki" (2024)	"Bellakita" (2024)

Luar la L singles chronology
"Mil Palabras" (2024)	"Toki" (2024)	"Zodiaco" (2024)

iZaak singles chronology
"Bby Boo" (2024)	"Toki" (2023)	"WYA" (remix blue) (2024)

Music video
- "Toki" on YouTube

"Toki" is a song by Puerto Rican rappers Casper Mágico, Anuel AA, Luar la L and iZaak. It was released on May 3, 2024, through Los Mágicos and GLAD Empire. The song was produced by J Castle and was originally supposed to be a single by Casper Mágico, Luar la L and iZaak. The artists decided to add Anuel AA in its final version.

== Background ==
The song was firstly previewed in the beginning of 2024 by Casper Mágico and Luar la L. On April 10, 2024, Casper Mágico posted in social media a promotional video for his upcoming single, "Toki", with Luar la L and iZaak.

In early May, 2024, Casper Mágico announced that the song got leaked but it would still come out with changed rhythm. Anuel AA joined Casper, Luar la L and iZaak for the final version of "Toki". The song was released on May 3, 2024, and was made worldwide available on all music platforms.

== Commercial performance ==
On the US Billboard Hot Latin Songs chart dated May 18, 2024, the song debuted at number 37.

In Spain, it debuted at number 57 on the chart dated May 3, 2024, and reached a new peak of 54 on the chart dated May 10, 2024.

== Controversy ==
In the lyrics, Anuel AA mentioned Puerto Rican rapper Bad Bunny and American model Kendall Jenner as much as American rapper Diddy and his ex-partner Cassie Ventura hinting that the relationship between Bad Bunny and Jenner ended the same way as the relationship between Diddy and Ventura. Anuel AA also disses Puerto Rican rappers Arcángel and Tempo alongside Dominican rapper Tali Goya claiming that his feud with them is still ongoing.

In an interview for Dominican radio host and celebrity interviewer Santiago Matías, known as Alofoke, Anuel AA explained why he mentioned Bad Bunny in "Toki". He said that they have a lot of differences and the relation between him and Bad Bunny is broken.

== Music video ==
The music video for the song was published on Anuel AA's YouTube channel on the day of its release. It was produced by TruViews and shows the artists dancing in the company of women.

== Charts ==
Chart performance for "Toki"
Chart (2024)	Peak position
Puerto Rico (Monitor Latino)	1
Spain (PROMUSICAE)	54
US Hot Latin Songs (Billboard)	37
