= Sol María =

Studio album by Eladio Carrión
- Released: January 19, 2024
- Genre: Latin trap; Latin pop
- Length: 48:25
- Language: Spanish
- Label: Rimas
- Producer: Alex Stein; Bass Charity; Boi-1da; CASHAE; Delarose; Digital Jet; DVLP; Fonta; Foreign Teck; Frank King; g.o.k.b; Hide Miyabi; Hydro; LASTMONDAY; Leon Thomas III; LilJuMadeDaBeat; Lou Caluso; LUYO; Mingus; NASA; Ninesoul; P.J. McGinnis; Pru; Rance; Sean Turk; Sky Rompiendo; Subelo NEO; Tatool; Vinylz; Westen Weiss; Xay

Eladio Carrión chronology
3men2 Kbrn (2023)	Sol María (2024)	Porque Puedo (2024)

Singles from Sol María
- 1. "TQMQA" Released: December 14, 2023; 2. "RKO" Released: January 19, 2024; 3. "La Canción Feliz del Disco" Released: April 10, 2024; 4. "Mamá's Boy" Released: May 12, 2024

Sol María is the fifth studio album by American rapper and singer Eladio Carrión. It was released on January 19, 2024, through Rimas Entertainment. It contains collaborations with Milo J, Yandel, Rauw Alejandro, Arcángel, De la Ghetto, Sech, Duki, and Nach. The album is named after Carrión's mother, Sol María, who the album is also dedicated to.

A Latin trap and Latin pop album, including fusions of other musical genres such as dancehall, Jersey club, R&B and reggaeton, Sol María received favorable to mixed reviews from critics, and debuted at number 37 on the US Billboard 200 with 18,000 album-equivalent units. It was also supported by its accompanying tour, the Sol María Tour, and four singles: "TQMQA", "RKO", "La Canción Feliz del Disco" and "Mamá's Boy".

== Background and release ==
Following the release of his 2023 album 3men2 Kbrn, Carrión's song "Coco Chanel" (with Bad Bunny), which was commercially successful, would be nominated for a Latin Grammy for Best Rap/Hip Hop Song at the 24th Annual Latin Grammy Awards and would win, though he wouldn't be at the awards to accept it.

In the beginning of 2024, Carrión would announce the release date of Sol María, scheduled for January 19, 2024. Though Carrión was not planning on not releasing any new music in 2024, his reason for the album's release, which is titled after his mother Sol María, is because he sees María as his number-one fan and wanted to create an album with songs that he thinks she would like.

== Composition ==
Sol María is mainly a Latin trap and pop album, containing elements of Afrobeats, dancehall, dembow, EDM, hip hop, Jersey club, R&B, reggae and reggaeton throughout the album. "Sigo Enamorau'" samples "I'm Still in Love with You", performed by Sean Paul, at the start of the song, while "Tranquila Baby" interpolates "You Got Me", performed by the Roots.

== Promotion ==
He would release "TQMQA" on December 14, 2023, as the lead single for Sol María. Produced by DVLP, Xay and Western Weiss, it received significant airplay in Latin music stations in the United States, eventually peaking atop the US Latin Airplay chart. "RKO" was released on the same day as the album as its second single; its accompanying music video, which was filmed at Citi Field, features American wrestler Randy Orton and Venezuelan baseball catcher Francisco Álvarez.

Carrión would also embark his supporting Sol María tour, which started on May 2, 2024, in San Juan, Puerto Rico and is set to conclude on September 29, 2024, in Veracruz, Mexico. He would also perform "Bendecido" and "La Canción Feliz del Disco" at the 36th Lo Nuestro Awards, where Milo J also appeared on the latter's performance; the latter's music video was released on April 10, 2024. A music video for "Mamá's Boy" with Nach was released on May 12, 2024, to coincide with Mother's Day in Puerto Rico.

== Reception ==
Professional ratings
Review scores
Source	Rating
AllMusic	3.5/5 stars
Jenesaispop	4.7/10

=== Commercial performance ===
Sol María debuted at number 37 on the US Billboard 200 and also debuted at numbers 6 and 3 on the US Top Latin Albums and US Latin Rhythm Albums charts, respectively, with 18,000 album-equivalent units sold in its first week. It also debuted at number 175 on Portugal's album chart and would debut atop the albums chart in Spain, making this Carrión's third number-one album on the latter chart. All 16 eligible songs from the album entered Spain's Top 100 singles chart, with "Hey Lil Mama" reaching the top 10.

== Track listing ==
Sol María track listing
No.	Title	Writer(s)	Producer(s)	Length
1.	"Bendecido"	Eladio Carrión	Hide Miyabi; Rance; NASA; g.o.k.b; Fonta	2:22
2.	"La Canción Feliz del Disco" (with Milo J)	Carrión; Camilo Joaquín Villarruel; Jordyn Elle Smith	Hide Miyabi; Tattool; CASHAE	2:53
3.	"TQMQA"	Carrión; Bigram Zayas	DVLP; Xay; Westen Weiss	2:49
4.	"Sonrisa"	Carrión	CASHAE; Sean Turk	2:32
5.	"Sigo Enamorau'" (with Yandel)	Carrión; Llandel Veguilla Malavé; Alton Nehemiah Ellis; Cleveland Browne; Sean Paul Ryan Francis Henriques	DVLP; LUYO; Lou Caluso; Delarose	3:14
6.	"Tu Ritmo"	Carrión	CASHAE; P.J. McGinnis	2:38
7.	"Hey Lil Mama" (with Rauw Alejandro)	Carrión; Raúl Alejandro Ocasio Ruiz	DVLP; Xay	3:36
8.	"Tranquila Baby"	Carrión; Ahmir K. Thompson; Jill Heather Scott; Scott Spencer Storch; Tariq Luqmaan Trotter	Pru; Hide Miyabi; Mingus; g.o.k.b; Alex Stein	2:08
9.	"Tanta Droga" (with Arcángel and De la Ghetto)	Carrión; Austin Agustín Santos Rosas; Rafael Castillo Torres	LilJuMadeDaBeat; Sky Rompiendo	4:08
10.	"El Malo" (with Sech)	Carrión; Carlos Isaías Morales Williams	Fonta; Hide Miyabi; Hydro; Subelo NEO	3:29
11.	"Fé, Cojones y Paciencia"	Carrión	Foreign Teck; Sean Turk; Hide Miyabi; Bass Charity	3:10
12.	"Todo Lit" (with Duki)	Carrión; Mauro Ezequiel Lombardo	Sean Turk; Digital Jet; Frank King	4:01
13.	"That Mother***** Eladio" (skit)	Carrión		0:40
14.	"Mencionar"	Carrión	DVLP; LASTMONDAY	2:21
15.	"RKO"	Carrión	Pru; Hide Miyabi; g.o.k.b; Ninesoul	1:46
16.	"Luchas Mentales"	Carrión	Boi-1da; Rance; Vinylz; Leon Thomas III	2:46
17.	"Mamá's Boy" (with Nach)	Carrión; Ignacio José Fornés Olmo	Hide Miyabi; Fonta; Sean Turk; Foreign Teck	3:42
Total length:				48:25

Notes

- "Sigo Enamorau" contains a sample of "I'm Still in Love With You", as written by Alton Nehemiah Ellis and Sean Paul Ryan Francis Henriques, as performed by Sean Paul.
- "Luchas Mentales" contains vocals from Alexandria Dopson.

== Charts ==
Weekly chart performance for Sol María
Chart (2024)	Peak position
Portuguese Albums (AFP)	175
Spanish Albums (Promusicae)	1
US Billboard 200	37
US Latin Rhythm Albums (Billboard)	3
US Top Latin Albums (Billboard)	6

== Certifications ==
Certifications and sales for Sol María
Region	Certification	Certified units/sales
Spain (Promusicae)	Gold	20,000^{‡}
^{‡} Sales+streaming figures based on certification alone.

== Release history ==
Release dates and formats for Sol María
Region	Date	Label(s)	Format(s)	Ref.
United States	January 19, 2024	Rimas	CD; digital download; streaming	
