= TQMQA =

Single by Eladio Carrión

from the album Sol María
- Language: Spanish
- English title: "I Love You More Than Yesterday"
- Released: December 14, 2023
- Genre: Latin pop; dembow
- Length: 3:35
- Label: Rimas
- Songwriters: Eladio Carrión Morales; Bigram John Zayas
- Producers: DVLP; Xay; Western Weiss

Eladio Carrión singles chronology
"6PM en Mallorca" (2023)	"TQMQA" (2023)	"100xCiento" (2024)

Music video
- "TQMQA" on YouTube

"TQMQA" (short for "Te Quiero Más Que Ayer"; transl. "I Love You More Than Yesterday") is a song by American singer Eladio Carrión, released on December 14, 2023, through Rimas Entertainment, as the lead single from his fifth studio album Sol María (2024). Produced by DVLP, Xay, and Western Weiss, it is a Latin pop song with elements of dembow, and is dedicated to Carrión's parents.

== Background ==
Carrión told Billboard about the song's concept:

When I first told my parents about the concept for "TQMQA," they were taken aback by how personal the song and video were. But it was special to us because we pieced together all these old clips from our home movies to make this time capsule of my upbringing. It's emotional to see how far we've come and how they've been there for me every step of the way. But none of us were prepared for how many people the song would resonate with.

== Commercial performance ==
Following the release of its parent album Sol María (2024), "TQMQA" debuted at number 38 on the US Hot Latin Songs chart. On the issue dated March 2, 2024, it peaked atop the Latin Pop Airplay chart, making it Carrión's first number-one on any Billboard chart. It would also peak atop the US Latin Airplay chart on the issue dated April 13, 2024, and re-entered the Hot Latin Songs chart at number 44 through a gain in airplay.

== Charts ==
Weekly chart performance for "Coco Chanel"
Chart (2023)	Peak position
Colombia (Monitor Latino)	1
Colombia (National-Report)	1
Dominican Republic (Monitor Latino)	1
Mexico (Monitor Latino)	1
Puerto Rico (Monitor Latino)	5
Spain (PROMUSICAE)	22
US Hot Latin Songs (Billboard)	38
US Latin Airplay (Billboard)	1
US Latin Pop Airplay (Billboard)	1

== Certifications ==
Certifications and sales for "TQMQA"
Region	Certification	Certified units/sales
Spain (Promusicae)	Gold	30,000^{‡}
^{‡} Sales+streaming figures based on certification alone.
