= Quema =

Single by Ryan Castro and Peso Pluma

from the album El Cantante del Ghetto
- Language: Spanish
- Released: 13 July 2023
- Genre: Reggaeton
- Length: 2:30
- Label: Sony Entertainment Colombia
- Songwriters: Bryan David Castro Sosa; Hassan Emilio Kabande Laija; Santiago Orrego Gallego
- Producer: SOG

Ryan Castro singles chronology
"Mercho Remix" (2023)	"Quema" (2023)	"Espacio" (2023)

Peso Pluma singles chronology
"Lagunas" (2023)	"Quema" (2023)	"Lady Gaga" (2023)

Music video
- "Quema" on YouTube

"Quema" (transl. "Burn") is a song by Colombian singer Ryan Castro and Mexican singer and rapper Peso Pluma, released on 13 July 2023 through Sony Music Entertainment Colombia, as the second single from the former's debut solo studio album El Cantante del Ghetto (2024). The song was produced by SOG, with them and both singers writing the song.

== Background ==
The song was originally teased through a TikTok video and at a live performance in Madrid, where he sang a part of it and his audience "echoing" its other lyrics.

== Commercial performance ==
"Quema" debuted at number 92 on the Billboard Hot 100 with 6.1 million official streams in the United States, making it Castro's first entry on the chart. It also received a Platinum certification in the Latin field by the Recording Industry Association of America (RIAA) for selling over 60 thousand copies in the United States.

== Charts ==
=== Weekly charts ===
Weekly chart performance for "Quema"
Chart (2023)	Peak position
Colombia (Billboard)	6
Ecuador (Billboard)	15
Global 200 (Billboard)	101
US Billboard Hot 100	92
US Hot Latin Songs (Billboard)	21
US Latin Airplay (Billboard)	23
US Latin Rhythm Airplay (Billboard)	10

=== Year-end charts ===
Year-end chart performance for "Quema"
Chart (2023)	Position
US Hot Latin Songs (Billboard)	71

== Certifications ==
Certifications and sales for "Quema"
Region	Certification	Certified units/sales
Mexico (AMPROFON)	Diamond+Platinum+Gold	910,000^{‡}
Spain (Promusicae)	Gold	30,000^{‡}
United States (RIAA)	17× Platinum (Latin)	1,020,000^{‡}
^{‡} Sales+streaming figures based on certification alone.
