= List of number-one albums of 2022 (Spain) =

Top 100 España is a record chart published weekly by PROMUSICAE (Productores de Música de España), a non-profit organization composed of Spanish and multinational record companies. This association tracks both physical (including CDs and vinyl) and digital (digital download and streaming) record consumption and sales in Spain.

== Albums ==
Week	Chart date	Album	Artist(s)	Ref
1	December 31	Sanz	Alejandro Sanz	
2	January 7	Sanz	Alejandro Sanz	
3	January 14	Vice Versa	Rauw Alejandro	
4	January 21	Las canciones del agua	Los Planetas	
5	January 28	Superpop	Belén Aguilera	
6	February 4	Dharma	Sebastián Yatra	
7	February 11	Inmortales	Funzo and Baby Loud	
8	February 18	Entre las dudas y el azar	Dani Fernández	
9	February 25	El Madrileño	C. Tangana	
10	March 4	Edificaciones Paganas	Fangoria	
11	March 11	Impera	Ghost	
12	March 18	Motomami	Rosalía	
13	March 25	Motomami	Rosalía	
14	April 2	Motomami	Rosalía	
15	April 9	Motomami	Rosalía	
16	April 16	Motomami	Rosalía	
17	April 23	Motomami	Rosalía	
18	April 30	Mi Vida en Marte	Manolo García	
19	May 6	Un Verano Sin Ti	Bad Bunny	
20	May 13	Un Verano Sin Ti	Bad Bunny	
21	May 20	Harry's House	Harry Styles	
22	May 27	Un Verano Sin Ti	Bad Bunny	
23	June 3	Un Verano Sin Ti	Bad Bunny	
24	June 10	Un Verano Sin Ti	Bad Bunny	
25	June 17	Un Verano Sin Ti	Bad Bunny	
26	June 24	Un Verano Sin Ti	Bad Bunny	
27	July 1	Un Verano Sin Ti	Bad Bunny	
28	July 8	Un Verano Sin Ti	Bad Bunny	
29	July 15	Un Verano Sin Ti	Bad Bunny	
30	July 22	Un Verano Sin Ti	Bad Bunny	
31	July 29	Un Verano Sin Ti	Bad Bunny	
32	August 5	Un Verano Sin Ti	Bad Bunny	
33	August 12	Un Verano Sin Ti	Bad Bunny	
34	August 19	Un Verano Sin Ti	Bad Bunny	
35	August 26	Un Verano Sin Ti	Bad Bunny	
36	September 2	Un Verano Sin Ti	Bad Bunny	
37	September 9	Un Verano Sin Ti	Bad Bunny	
38	September 16	Un Verano Sin Ti	Bad Bunny	
39	September 23	Un Verano Sin Ti	Bad Bunny	
40	September 30	Un Verano Sin Ti	Bad Bunny	
41	October 7	Un Verano Sin Ti	Bad Bunny	
42	October 14	Un Verano Sin Ti	Bad Bunny	
43	October 21	Midnights	Taylor Swift	
44	October 28	Midnights	Taylor Swift	
45	November 4	Paraíso	Mora	
46	November 11	Faith in the Future	Louis Tomlinson	
47	November 18	Sen2 Kbrn, Vol. 2	Eladio Carrión	
48	November 25	Corazon Y Flecha	Manuel Carrasco	
49	December 2	La Cuarta Hoja	Pablo Alborán	
50	December 9	Corazon Y Flecha	Manuel Carrasco	
51	December 16	Corazon Y Flecha	Manuel Carrasco	
52	December 23	Los Potros del Tiempo	Marea	
1	December 30	Corazon Y Flecha	Manuel Carrasco	
