= Sauce Boyz 2 =

Studio album by Eladio Carrión
- Released: December 2, 2021
- Genre: Reggaeton; Latin hip hop
- Length: 66:00
- Language: Spanish
- Label: Rimas

Eladio Carrión chronology
Sen2 Kbrn, Vol. 1 (2021)	Sauce Boyz 2 (2021)	Sen2 Kbrn, Vol. 2 (2022)

Singles from Sauce Boyz 2
- 1. "Sauce Boy Freestyle 5" Released: October 15, 2021; 2. "Cuarentena" Released: October 28, 2021; 3. "Alejarte de Mi" Released: November 18, 2021; 4. "Jóvenes Millonarios" Released: November 30, 2021

Sauce Boyz 2 is the third studio album by American rapper and singer Eladio Carrión, released on December 2, 2021, through Rimas Entertainment. It features guest appearances from Karol G, Sech, Rels B, Jay Wheeler, Bizarrap, Duki, Luar la L, Myke Towers, Ovi, Jon Z, Noriel, Arcángel, and Nicky Jam.

It was preceded with four singles released from October to November 2023: "Sauce Boy Freestyle 5", "Cuarentena", "Alejarte de Mi" with Jay Wheeler and "Jóvenes Millonarios" with Myke Towers.

== Commercial performance ==
Sauce Boyz 2 debuted at number 92 on the Billboard 200 with 13,000 album-equivalent units, and a total of 18.4 million streams in the United States. It also debuted at number two on US Top Latin Albums and Latin Rhythm Albums.

== Track listing ==
Ares track listing
No.	Title	Length
1.	"Par de Tenis"	3:01
2.	"Claro Cristal"	2:41
3.	"No Te Deseo el Mal" (with Karol G)	3:52
4.	"Flores en Anónimo"	2:50
5.	"Fuego"	2:35
6.	"Miradas Raras" (with Sech)	3:15
7.	"Me Gustas Natural" (with Rels B)	2:50
8.	"Quienes Son Ustedes"	2:20
9.	"Alejarte de Mi" (with Jay Wheeler)	3:53
10.	"Gastar"	2:29
11.	"Hola Como Vas"	3:18
12.	"Sin Frenos" (with Bizarrap and Duki)	3:31
13.	"Socio" (with Luar la L)	4:13
14.	"Jóvenes Millonarios" (with Myke Towers)	3:02
15.	"No Me Importa un Carajo" (with Ovi)	3:10
16.	"Mami Dijo"	2:13
17.	"Cheque" (with Jon Z and Noriel)	3:30
18.	"Como Sea" (with Arcángel)	3:22
19.	"Primera Vez" (with Nicky Jam)	3:09
20.	"Cuarentena"	2:11
21.	"Touch Your Body"	2:27
22.	"Sauce Boy Freestyle 5"	2:57
Total length:		66:00

== Charts ==
Weekly chart performance for Sauce Boyz
Chart (2024)	Peak position
Spanish Albums (PROMUSICAE)	5
US Billboard 200	92
US Independent Albums (Billboard)	9
US Latin Rhythm Albums (Billboard)	2
US Top Latin Albums (Billboard)	2

== Certifications ==
Certifications and sales for Sauce Boyz 2
Region	Certification	Certified units/sales
Spain (PROMUSICAE)	Platinum	40,000^{‡}
^{‡} Sales+streaming figures based on certification alone.
