= WYA (song) =

2023 song by J Abdiel and iZaak

Single by J Abdiel and iZaak
- Language: Spanish
- Released: September 20, 2023
- Genre: Latin R&B; Latin trap
- Length: 3:16
- Label: Hit Nation
- Songwriters: Norberto Colon; Isaac Ortiz
- Producers: Dimeeeak; Koala the Source; Nobuddy

J Abdiel singles chronology
"Sin Taboo" (2023)	"WYA" (2023)	"Los 20s" (2023)

iZaak singles chronology
"Guaro" (2023)	"WYA" (2023)	"Bonnie and Clyde" (remix) (2023)

Music video
- "WYA" on YouTube

"WYA" (abbreviation for "Where You At?") is a song by Puerto Rican singers J Abdiel and iZaak. The song was released by Hit Nation LLC as a single on September 20, 2023, for digital download and streaming. On May 10, 2024, three remix versions was released as a singles: "remix blue" with Puerto Rican rappers Hades66 and Miky Woodz and Venezuelan singer Corina Smith, "remix red" with Puerto Rican singers De la Rose, Yan Block and Jay Wheeler, and "remix white" with Puerto Rican singers Juhn and Slayter and Spanish singer Aleesha. Another remix denominated "remix black and yellow", with Puerto Rican singer Anuel AA and Colombian singers Blessd and Pirlo, was released on July 22, 2024.

== Commercial performance ==
"WYA" peaked at the Billboard Hot Latin Songs at number 21 on the chart dated July 13, 2024. The song also appeared on the Billboard charts in Bolivia (19), Chile (10), Colombia (6), Ecuador (8), Peru (8) and Spain (11).

== Music video ==
The music video was uploaded to YouTube on J Abdiel's channel on September 21, 2024, a day after the release of the song.

== Charts ==
Chart performance for "WYA"
Chart (2024)	Peak position
Bolivia (Billboard)	19
Chile (Billboard)	10
Colombia (Billboard)	6
Ecuador (Billboard)	8
Peru (Billboard)	8
Spain (Billboard)	11
US Hot Latin Songs (Billboard)	21

== Certifications ==
Certifications for "WYA"
Region	Certification	Certified units/sales
Spain (Promusicae)	Gold	30,000^{‡}
United States (RIAA) "WYA" (remix blue)	Gold (Latin)	30,000^{‡}
^{‡} Sales+streaming figures based on certification alone.

== Remix red ==
"WYA" (remix red)

Single by J Abdiel, De la Rose and Yan Block featuring iZaak and Jay Wheeler
- Released: May 10, 2024
- Genre: Latin R&B; Latin trap
- Length: 5:21
- Label: Sonar
- Songwriters: Colon; Ortiz; José López; Yuberkis de la Rose; Carlos Martin
- Producers: Jodosky; Dimeeeak; Koala The Source; Nobuddy

De la Rose singles chronology
"Comen Dos" (2024)	"WYA" (remix red) (2024)	"3D" (2024)

Yan Block singles chronology
"444" (2024)	"WYA" (remix red) (2024)	"Cielo" (2024)

Jay Wheeler singles chronology
"Textos Fríos" (2024)	"WYA" (remix red) (2024)	"Hoodie" (2024)

Music video
- "WYA" (remix red) on YouTube

On May 10, 2024, a remix version of the song with participation of Puerto Rican singers De la Rose, Yan Block and Jay Wheeler was made available worldwide as a single through Sonar. It was produced by Jodosky, Dimeeeak, Koala The Source and nobuddy. In Spain, "WYA" (remix red) debuted at number 59 on the chart dated June 18, 2021, and would reach its peak at number 30 at its eight week. It got a platinum certification by PROMUSICAE and a double-platinum certification by RIAA.

=== Music video ===
A music video was released the same day the single was released along with the music videos for the other two remix versions. The music video for "WYA" (remix red) has reached 200 million views on YouTube.

=== Charts ===
Weekly chart performance for "WYA" (remix red)
Chart (2024)	Peak position
Spain (PROMUSICAE)	30

=== Certifications ===
Certifications for "WYA" (remix red)"
Region	Certification	Certified units/sales
Spain (Promusicae)	Platinum	60,000^{‡}
United States (RIAA)	2× Platinum (Latin)	120,000^{‡}
^{‡} Sales+streaming figures based on certification alone.

== Remix black and yellow ==
"WYA" (remix black and yellow)

Single by J Abdiel, Anuel AA and Blessd featuring iZaak and Pirlo
- Released: June 21, 2024
- Genre: Latin R&B; Latin trap
- Length: 6:30
- Label: Warner Latina
- Songwriters: Colon; Ortiz; Emmanuel Gazmey; Stiven Londoño; Emanuel Cortés Herrera
- Producers: Jodosky; Dimeeeak; Koala the Source

Anuel AA singles chronology
"Toki" (2024)	"WYA" (remix black and yellow) (2024)	"Razones" (2024)

Blessd singles chronology
"Mírame" (2024)	"WYA" (remix black and yellow) (2024)	"Mela" (2024)

Pirlo singles chronology
"Droga" (2024)	"WYA" (remix black and yellow) (2024)	"Le Falta la Forty" (2024)

Music video
- "WYA" (remix black and yellow) on YouTube

On June 21, 2024, a fourth remix version of the song with participation of Puerto Rican singer Anuel AA and Colombian singers Blessd and Pirlo was made available worldwide as a single through Warner Music Latina, with an audio visualizer on Warner Música's YouTube channel. The song was produced by Jodosky, Dimeeeak, Koala The Source.

=== Composition ===
In the lyrics, Anuel AA interpolated the intro of his song "Tú Me Enamoraste" (remix). He also mentioned reggaeton fellow artists including Zion, Cris MJ, Rauw Alejandro, Chencho Corleone, Don Omar and Yandel.

=== Commercial performance ===
"WYA" (remix black and yellow) debuted at number 79 on the Argentina Hot 100 on the chart dated June 29, 2024. The song reached its peak at number 10 in its 13th week on the chart dated September 21, 2024. It also appeared on Spain's official chart at number 65.

=== Music video ===
The music video was released the same day the single was released on June 26, 2024. It was directed by TruViews and has reached 87 million views on YouTube.

=== Charts ===
Weekly chart performance for "WYA" (remix black and yellow)
Chart (2024)	Peak position
Argentina Hot 100 (Billboard)	10
Spain (PROMUSICAE)	65

=== Certifications ===
Certifications for "WYA" (remix black and yellow)"
Region	Certification	Certified units/sales
United States (RIAA)	Gold (Latin)	30,000^{‡}
^{‡} Sales+streaming figures based on certification alone.
