= Monastery (song) =

Single by Ryan Castro and Feid

from the album Inter Shibuya (Ferxxo Edition)
- Language: Spanish
- Released: November 11, 2021
- Genre: Reggaeton
- Label: King; Universal Latino
- Songwriters: Santiago Orrego Gallego; Daniel Pineda Foronda; Bryan Castro Sosa; Salomón Villada Hoyos
- Producers: COQE; SOG

Ryan Castro singles chronology
"Malory" (2021)	"Monastery" (2021)	"Chupable" (2021)

Feid singles chronology
"Vacaxiones" (2021)	"Monastery" (2021)	"Fumeteo" (remix) (2021)

"Monastery" is a song by Colombian singers Ryan Castro and Feid. It was released on November 11, 2021 under King and Universal Latino as the eighth single from the special edition of Feid's fourth studio album Inter Shibuya (Ferxxo Edition) (2021).

== Background and release ==
"Monastery" originated from an unreleased remix of the song "Poblado" by Crissin, Totoy el Frío, and Natan & Shander, in which J Balvin, Karol G, Nicky Jam, Blessd, and Ryan Castro were scheduled to participate. However, the remix was eventually released without Blessd or Castro. In the unreleased verse, Castro mentioned the Colombian clothing brand Monastery, which caught the attention of its owner, Pedro Castellanos. After the cancellation of the single, Castellanos proposed that Castro create a song focused on his company. Although Zion was initially considered to be included in the song, Feid was ultimately chosen for a purely Colombian approach. "Monastery" was officially released on November 11, 2021. Later, on December 7, 2021, the song was included as the eighth single on Feid's deluxe edition album, Inter Shibuya (Ferxxo Edition).

== Music video ==
The music video for "Monastery" was released on November 12, 2021, and it premiered on Ryan Castro's YouTube channel. The video was skillfully directed by Tororestre, Lamonadelasfotos, and Felipe Mejía. In this visually captivating audiovisual, the two artists are seen touring the city in their ships. Additionally, there are scenes set in a mansion, where an intriguing and striking party takes place.

== Critical reception ==
The Colombian website Shock highlighted "Monastery" as a song in which "it talks about flirting, sex and desire, but winks at other popular songs such as Poblado". He also premeditated that the song "will have its peak in December, a season in which there will be parties almost every day and where reggaeton will sound harder than ever".

== Awards and nominations ==
Awards and nominations received by "Monastery"
Award	Year	Category	Result	Ref.
Premios Nuestra Tierra	2022	Best Urban Song	Nominated	
Premios Nuestra Tierra	2023	Best Urban Collaboration	Won	

== Charts ==
Weekly chart performance for "Monastery"
Chart (2022)	Peak position
Colombia (Billboard)	1
Ecuador (Billboard)	4

== Certifications ==
Certifications and sales for "Monastery"
Region	Certification	Certified units/sales
Mexico (AMPROFON)	Platinum	140,000^{‡}
Spain (Promusicae)	Platinum	60,000^{‡}
Streaming
Central America (CFC)	Gold	3,500,000^{†}
^{‡} Sales+streaming figures based on certification alone.^{†} Streaming-only figures based on certification alone.
