= Ryan Castro =

Colombian rapper, singer and songwriter (born 1994)

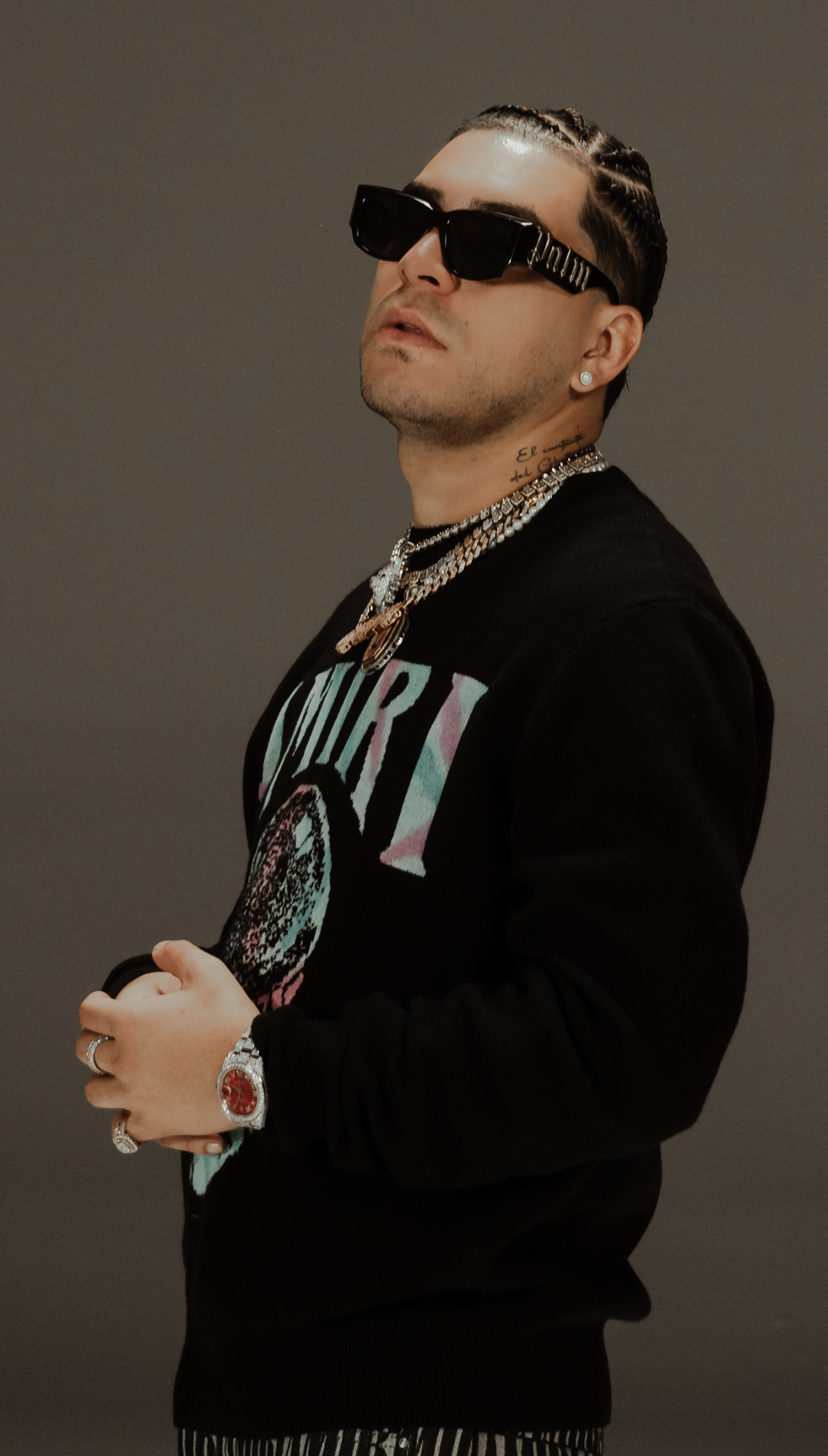
- Castro in 2023

Background information
- Born: Bryan David Castro Sosa; 14 January 1994 (age 32); Bello, Antioquia, Colombia
- Genres: Reggaeton; Latin trap
- Occupations: Rapper; singer; songwriter
- Years active: 2016–present
- Labels: Sony Latin; King
- Website: www.ryancastro.com

Bryan David Castro Sosa (born 14 January 1994), known professionally as Ryan Castro, is a Colombian rapper, singer, and songwriter. He achieved worldwide recognition for his songs "Quema", "Jordan", "Mujeriego", and "Monastery".

== Early years ==
Castro was born in Bello and raised in the Pedregal neighbourhood, in the north of Medellín, the capital of Antioquia. From an early age, he demonstrated musical abilities, especially in rap, freestyle, and dancehall, genres in which he excelled in high school. After graduating from high school at age 17, he began singing on buses, which helped him contribute to the subsistence at home. This allowed him to gain experience and confidence over the years, and he soon began performing in bars, clubs and music events. Years later, he traveled to Curaçao, where he found inspiration by the sea to create his music.

== Musical career ==
Ryan Castro began his professional career in Colombia in 2017 with the single "Morena", promoting his songs on digital platforms such as YouTube and SoundCloud. Later, he became known on the music scene by signing with Kevin Roldán's label, Kings Records. In 2020, he began to see success in his homeland with the release of the single "Lejanía".

Following this, Castro released several hits, "Wasa Wasa" and "Malory". On 12 November 2021, he released a duet with Colombian artist Feid titled "Monastery". On 17 December 2021, he achieved international success with the release of the single "Mujeriego", which entered the Billboard Global 200 chart. This was followed by "Jordan", which also charted well on the Spotify Global Top 50 chart for several weeks; the accompanying music video has received over 400 million views on YouTube. 2021 saw Castro fully cementing himself within the nueva generación (new generation) of musicians emerging from Latin America.

On 27 January 2022, Castro was featured with Blessd on the remix to "Quién TV". Castro's rise to stardom through music led him to perform at the MTV Video Music Awards, where he performed the single "Nivel de Perreo" with fellow Colombian artist J Balvin. This continued success resulted in Castro being offered a music distribution contract with Sony Music in 2022. That same year, he won in two categories at the Premios Heat ("Heat Awards"), where he was nominated for 'Best Andean-Region Artist' and 'Best New Generation—Male'. On 5 August 2022, he released his first EP, Reggaetonera, with a total of seven songs. He later presented his second EP, Los Piratas, with producer SOG.

In June 2023, Castro sued Kings Records for mismanagement of his recordings, and for management and publishing disagreements. Also that same year, Castro released "Ghetto Star", a symbolic song that shows how a young man from a humble neighbourhood became a music leader. He traveled to Puerto Rico to record the video for the single "X 1 Beso" with De La Ghetto. Additionally, he participated in the remix of "Corazón Roto" and "Mercho" alongside Lil Cake, Ozuna, Migrantes and Nico Valdi.

During the second half of 2023, he toured Europe for two months, and premiered his hit "Quema" alongside Mexican artist Peso Pluma, a track which entered the US Billboard Hot Latin Songs and Billboard Hot 100. On 10 August 2023, Castro and fellow Colombian singer Karol G were featured on a remix of "Una Noche en Medellín" by Chilean rapper Chris MJ. In June 2024, Castro, along with Chris MJ, made a surprise appearance to perform "Una Noche en Medellín" live during one of Karol G's four sold-out shows at Estadio Santiago Bernabéu, Madrid.

On 5 October 2023, he was featured on "Ghetto Princess", a collaboration between himself, Barcelona-based singer Bad Gyal and Medellín producer Ovy on the Drums.

Castro's debut album, El Cantante del Ghetto, was released in May 2024 on Sony Music Latin. In July 2024, Castro was featured on the collaborative single "Party Amanecío" along with Bad Gyal, De La Ghetto and Maldy, produced by DJ Luian and Mambo Kingz.

On 8 June 2024, Castro released "El Ritmo Que Nos Une", featuring members of the Colombia national football team, including Luis Díaz and Juan Fernando Quintero who both performed verses on the song. The song was featured as the official song for Colombia's national team in the 2024 Copa América.

== Discography ==
Albums

- El Cantante del Ghetto (2024)
- Sendé (2025)
- Hopi Sendé (2025)
- Omertà (2026, with J Balvin)

Extended Plays

- Reggaetonera (2022)
- Los Piratas (2022, with SOG)
