= 3men2 Kbrn =

Studio album by Eladio Carrión
- Released: March 17, 2023
- Genre: Latin trap
- Length: 54:44
- Language: Spanish; English
- Label: Rimas

Eladio Carrión chronology
| Sen2 Kbrn, Vol. 2 (2022) | 3men2 Kbrn (2023) | Sol María (2024) |

Singles from 3men2 Kbrn
- 1. "Mbappé (remix)" Released: March 9, 2023; 2. "Air France" Released: March 14, 2023

3men2 Kbrn (an abbreviation of "tremendo cabrón") is the fourth studio album by American rapper and singer Eladio Carrión, released on March 17, 2023, through Rimas Entertainment. It features guest appearances from Lil Wayne, Future, 50 Cent, Bad Bunny, Myke Towers, Quavo, Rich the Kid, Ñengo Flow, Lil Tjay, Luar la L, and Fivio Foreign. Two singles were released from the album; the remix version of "Mbappe", featuring Future, was released on March 9, 2023, and "Air France" was released on March 14, 2023.

== Promotion ==
The remix version of "Mbappé" (from Sen2 Kbrn, Vol. 2) with American rapper Future was released on March 9, 2023, as the lead single from 3men2 Kbrn. "Air France" would be released as the album's second single on March 14, 2023. A music video for "Si Salimos" with American rapper 50 Cent was released on May 17, 2023. Carrión would also embark his own music festival, Sauce Boyz Fest, where two dates took place on May 18 and 20.

== Commercial performance ==
3men2 Kbrn debuted at number 16 on the US Billboard 200 with 25,000 album-equivalent units. It also debuted at number 3 on the US Top Latin Albums and Latin Rhythm Albums charts. From the album, "Coco Chanel" with Bad Bunny attained commercial success, debuting at number 87 on the Billboard Hot 100, and the "Si la Calle Llama" remix with Myke Towers performed similarly.

== Track listing ==
3men2 Kbrn track listing
| No. | Title | Writer(s) | Producer(s) | Length |
|---|---|---|---|---|
| 1. | "Padre Tiempo" | Eladio Carrión Morales; Bigram John Zayas | DVLP; Lou Caluso; Hydro; Bassy; G.O.K.B; Lil Mexico | 3:39 |
| 2. | "Gladiador" (remix with Lil Wayne) | Dwayne Michael Carter Jr.; Carrión; Zayas | Hydro; Bassy; DVLP; Lil Geniuz; BassCharity; Sean Turk; Foreign Teck | 3:17 |
| 3. | "El Hokage" | Carrión | Bassy; Hide Miyabi; Hydro; Ronan Decierdo | 2:05 |
| 4. | "Mbappé" (remix with Future) | Nayvadius Wilburn; Carrión | Hydro; Bassy; Hide Miyabi; Ronan Decierdo | 3:57 |
| 5. | "Si Salimos" (with 50 Cent) | Curtis James Jackson III; Carrión | G.O.K.B; Nasa; Lil Geniuz | 3:21 |
| 6. | "¿Qué Carajos Quieres Tú Ahora?" | Carrión; Zayas; Western Weiss | DVLP; Western Weiss; Xay | 2:35 |
| 7. | "Cuevita" | Carrión | Hydro; Bassy | 2:40 |
| 8. | "Coco Chanel" (with Bad Bunny) | Benito Antonio Martínez Ocasio; Carrión; Zayas | DVLP; Xay | 3:28 |
| 9. | "Si la Calle Llama" (remix featuring Myke Towers) | Michael Anthony Torres Monge; Carrión | Hydro; Bassy; Sauceman36; Yecko | 4:00 |
| 10. | "Peso a Peso" (with Quavo and Rich the Kid featuring Ñengo Flow) | Quavious Keyate Marshall; Dimitri Leslie Roger; Edwin Rosa Vázquez Ortiz; Carrión | Hide Miyabi; Vikas Prasad; Alex Stein | 3:37 |
| 11. | "Mala Mía Otra Vez" | Carrión; Zayas | DVLP; Hydro; Bassy; Foreign Teck | 2:47 |
| 12. | "Friends" (remix with Lil Tjay and Luar la L) | Tione Jayden Merritt; Raúl Armando del Valle Robles; Carrión | Hide Miyabi; Based1; Holy | 4:08 |
| 13. | "Quizás, Tal Vez" | Carrión | Hydro; Bassy; Hide Miyabi | 2:27 |
| 14. | "M3" (with Fivio Foreign) | Maxie Lee Ryles III; Carrión | G.O.K.B; Lil Mexico | 3:12 |
| 15. | "Betty" | Carrión | SHB; Hydro; Bassy; Hide Miyabi; Alex Stein; Ronan Decierdo; eest.id | 3:22 |
| 16. | "Haciendo Dinero" | Carrión | Foreign Teck; UpNorth; Sean Turk; Chris Hojas | 2:27 |
| 17. | "¿Cómo?" (skit) | Carrión | | 0:36 |
| 18. | "Air France" | Carrión | Foreign Teck; Theownlyhope; BassCharity | 3:06 |
| Total length: | | | | 54:44 |

== Charts ==
Weekly chart performance for 3men2 Kbrn
| Chart (2023) | Peak position |
|---|---|
| Spanish Albums (PROMUSICAE) | 1 |
| US Billboard 200 | 16 |
| US Independent Albums (Billboard) | 2 |
| US Latin Rhythm Albums (Billboard) | 3 |
| US Top Latin Albums (Billboard) | 3 |

== Certifications ==
Certifications and sales for 3men2 Kbrn
| Region | Certification | Certified units/sales |
|---|---|---|
| Spain (PROMUSICAE) | Gold | 20,000^{‡} |
^{‡} Sales+streaming figures based on certification alone.
