= Porque Puedo =

EP by Eladio Carrión
- Released: May 1, 2024
- Genre: Latin trap
- Length: 13:04
- Language: Spanish
- Label: Rimas
- Producer: Hide Miyabi; Fonta; Aiden Cullen; Nico Baran; SterlingMadelt; BASSCHARITY; Sean Turk; Digital Jet; Frank King; TOYOBEBE

Eladio Carrión chronology
Sol María (2024)	Porque Puedo (2024)

Singles from Porque Puedo
- 1. "Heavyweight" Released: May 1, 2024

Porque Puedo (transl. Because I Can) is the debut extended play by American rapper and singer Eladio Carrión. It was surprise released on the afternoon of May 1, 2024, through Rimas Entertainment, four months after the release of his fifth studio album Sol María.

== Background and release ==
Regarding Sol María, Carrión said in a press release: "With Sol María being a more commercial album, I felt I owed my fans some trap, as more of a commercial album". He later began working on new music and eventually "turned into Porque Puedo", which he released with little announcement to coincide with the beginning of the Sol María tour. "Heavyweight" was also released as its lead single in the same day.

== Track listing ==
All tracks are written by Eladio Carrión.

Porque Puedo track listing
No.	Title	Producer(s)	Length
1.	"Heavyweight"	Hide Miyabi; Fonta; Aiden Cullen; Nico Baran	2:44
2.	"Don Kbrn Freestyle"	Hide Miyabi; SterlingMadelt	2:24
3.	"Código G"	BASSCHARITY; Hide Miyabi	2:31
4.	"Henny Mood"	Sean Turk; Digital Jet; Frank King; TOYOBEBE	2:46
5.	"Susanoo"	BASSCHARITY; Hide Miyabi	2:37
Total length:			13:04

== Charts ==
Weekly chart performance for Porque Puedo
Chart (2024)	Peak position
Spanish Albums (PROMUSICAE)	18

== Release history ==
Release history for Porque Puedo
Region	Date	Format	Label	Ref.
Various	May 3, 2024	Digital download; streaming	Rimas	
