= Jay Wheeler =

Puerto Rican singer and rapper (born 1994)

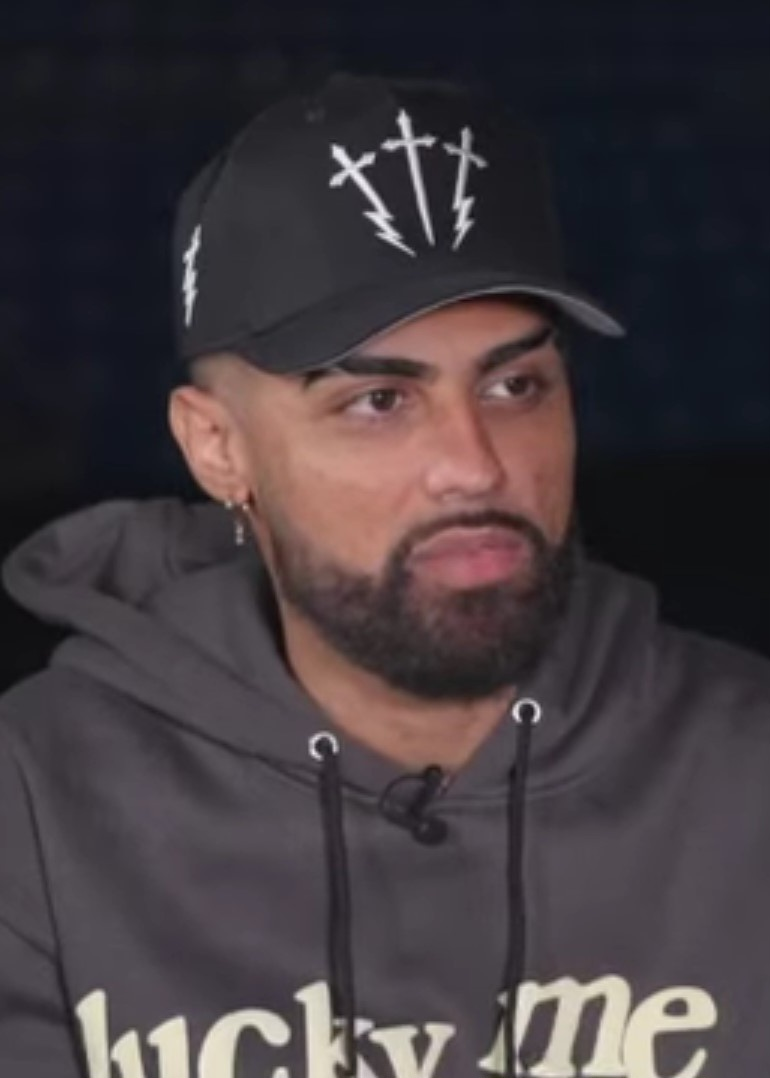
- Jay Wheeler in 2022

Background information
- Born: José Ángel López Martínez; April 25, 1994 (age 32); Salinas, Puerto Rico
- Genres: Reggaeton; ballad; pop; trap; R&B
- Occupations: Singer; songwriter
- Years active: 2016–present
- Spouse: Zhamira Zambrano (m. 2022)

José Ángel López Martínez (born April 25, 1994), known by his stage name Jay Wheeler, is a Puerto Rican singer and songwriter. Wheeler first became widely known after a video of him singing went viral in 2016, after which he began pursuing a career as a musician. Signing with Dynamic Records in 2018, his debut album Platónico was released the following year, executively produced by DJ Nelson. His second effort, Platónicos, again produced by DJ Nelson, was released in 2020, and contained the successful single "La Curiosidad" featuring Myke Towers, which peaked at #5 on the Billboard Hot Latin Songs chart.

== Early life ==
Wheeler was born José Ángel López Martínez on April 25, 1994, to a working-class family in Salinas, Puerto Rico. He first developed an interest in music as a child through singing at his local church, where he also learned to play the piano. Throughout his teenage years Wheeler stopped singing and instead began experimenting with production, after developing a fear of singing in public due to the regular bullying he suffered at school. At the age of 16, Wheeler separated from his girlfriend, an incident that inspired him to write a new song, "Ahora Estoy Mejor" and record himself singing it. After showing it to a friend, he was encouraged to post it online, where it went viral overnight, generating over 500,000 views and serving as a platform for Wheeler to seriously pursue a career as a musician.

== Career ==
=== Early years (2016–2018) ===
Wheeler used his newfound fanbase to continue to release music through both Instagram and Facebook, building up a steady following and earning the nickname "La Voz Favorita" (The Favourite Voice). He would later choose to go by the stage name Jay Wheeler; he asked his fans to choose a name that would go with "Jay", eventually choosing Wheeler as the best suggestion; he believed "Jay Wheeler, La Voz Favorita" just sounded right. After a steady number of releases between 2016 and 2018, Wheeler was noticed by Dynamic Records, who signed him to his first record deal. A video of Wheeler brought to tears on stage at the sight of fans singing his music went viral in 2018, and was later seen by DJ Nelson, who reached out to Wheeler and offered to be his mentor.

=== 2019–present: Platónico, Platónicos and work with DJ Nelson ===
DJ Nelson told Wheeler that he had an exact vision for him as an artist and offered to executively produce his debut studio album Platónico, released in 2019, containing the successful Otra Noche Más remix with Farruko.

Wheeler began work on his second effort soon after, a sequel to his first album to be known as Platónicos. Released in 2020 and again produced by DJ Nelson, the album contained the hit single "La Curiosidad" featuring Myke Towers, which peaked at #5 on the Billboard Hot Latin Songs chart.

== Discography ==
=== Studio albums ===
List of extended plays, with selected chart positions
Title	Album details	Peak chart positions	
Title	Album details	US Latin	SPA
Platónico (with DJ Nelson)	Released: November 28, 2019; Labels: Linked Music, Dynamic Records, Empire; Format: Digital download, streaming	—	72
Platónicos (with DJ Nelson)	Released: June 12, 2020; Labels: Linked Music, Dynamic Records, Empire; Format: Digital download, streaming	34	23
De Mí Para Ti	Released: January 12, 2022; Labels: Linked Music, Dynamic Records, Empire; Format: Digital download, streaming	—	68
El Amor y Yo	Released: February 11, 2022; Labels: Linked Music, Dynamic Records, Empire; Format: Digital download, streaming	—	36
Emociones	Released: August 19, 2022; Labels: Linked Music, Dynamic Records, Empire; Format: Digital download, streaming	10	13
Emociones 1.5	Released: April 25, 2023; Labels: Linked Music, Dynamic Records, Empire; Format: Digital download, streaming	—	67
Trappii	Released: October 27, 2023; Labels: Linked Music, Dynamic Records, Empire; Format: Digital download, streaming	—	18
Música Buena Para Días Malos	Released: April 25, 2024; Labels: Linked Music, Dynamic Records, Empire; Format: Digital download, streaming	—	15
Girasoles	Released: March 21, 2025; Labels: Linked Music, Dynamic Records, Empire; Format: Digital download, streaming	—	18
La Voz Favorita	Released: May 28. 2026; Labels: Linked Music, Dynamic Records, Empire; Format: Digital download, streaming	—	13
"—" denotes a title that was not released or did not chart in that territory.

=== Singles ===
==== As lead artist ====
List of singles as lead artist, with selected chart positions
Title	Year	Peak chart positions				Certifications	Album
Title	Year	US Bub.	US Latin	SPA	WW	Certifications	Album
"Lloras (remix)" (with Cauty and Lenny Tavárez featuring Noriel and Alex Rose)	2020	—	—	—	—	PROMUSICAE: Gold	Non-album singles
"Vete Pal Carajo" (with DJ Nelson and Yan Block)	2020	—	—	12	—	RIAA: 2× Platinum (Latin); PROMUSICAE: Platinum	Non-album singles
"La Curiosidad (Blue Gran Prix remix)" (with Myke Towers and Rauw Alejandro featuring DJ Nelson, Jhayco, Lunay and Kendo Kaponi)	2020	1	—	14	40	PROMUSICAE: Platinum	Non-album singles
"No Te Enamores (remix)" (with Milly and Alan Walker featuring Farruko, Nio Garcia and Amenazzy)	2021	—	—	5	132	RIAA: Platinum (Latin); PROMUSICAE: 2× Platinum	Non-album singles
"Desnudarte" (with Brytiago)	2021	—	—	—	—	RIAA: Platinum (Latin)	Non-album singles
"Conexión" (with Foreign Teck and Justin Quiles featuring Bryant Myers, Eladio Carrión and Tory Lanez)	2021	—	—	83	—	RIAA: 3× Platinum (Latin); PROMUSICAE: Platinum	Non-album singles
"Si Te Veo" (with Arcángel and Miky Woods)	2021	—	—	43	—	PROMUSICAE: Gold	Non-album singles
"Fragancia" (with Juhn)	2021	—	—	38	—	RIAA: Platinum (Latin); PROMUSICAE: Gold	Non-album singles
"Otro Fili" (with J Balvin)	2021	—	26	51	—	PROMUSICAE: Gold	Non-album singles
"Desde Mis Ojos (remix)" (with Chris Lebron and Sech)	2022	—	43	—	—	RIAA: Platinum (Latin)	Non-album singles
"Si Te Preguntan" (with Prince Royce and Nicky Jam)	2022	—	31	96	—	RIAA: 3× Platinum (Latin); PROMUSICAE: Gold	Non-album singles
"Suelta" (with Mora)	2022	—	—	35	—	RIAA: Platinum (Latin); PROMUSICAE: Platinum	Emociones
"Dicelo" (with Zhamira Zambrano)	2022	—	—	—	—	RIAA: 2× Platinum (Latin); PROMUSICAE: Gold	Emociones
"Pacto" (with Dei V and Hades66 featuring Luar la L)	2023	—	—	42	—	PROMUSICAE: Gold	Emociones 1.5
"Pacto (remix)" (with Anuel AA and Hades66 featuring Bryant Myers and Dei V)	2023	—	29	29	168	PROMUSICAE: Platinum	TraPPii
"Extrañándote" (with Zhamira Zambrano)	2023	—	—	—	—	RIAA: 2× Platinum (Latin)	Non-album single
"Textos Fríos" (with Mora)	2024	—	—	63	—		Música Buena Para Días Malos
"Aunque Llegue Otro" (with Myke Towers)	2024	—	—	63	—		La Pantera Negra
"De Lejitos"	2026	15	8	1	77		Non-album single
"—" denotes a title that was not released or did not chart in that territory.

==== As featured artist ====
List of singles as featured artist, with selected chart positions
Title	Year	Peak chart positions	Certifications	Album
Title	Year	SPA	Certifications	Album
"La Tóxica (remix)" (Farruko, Sech and Myke Towers featuring Jay Wheeler and Tempo)	2020	54	PROMUSICAE: Platinum	Non-album singles
"Quítenme El Teléfono" (Dímelo Flow, Sech, Dalex, Justin Quiles and Lenny Tavárez featuring Yandel and Jay Wheeler)	2024	55		The Academy: Segunda Misión
"WYA (Remix Red)" (J Abdiel, De La Rose and Yan Block featuring iZaak and Jay Wheeler)	2024	30	PROMUSICAE: Gold	Non-album singles

=== Other charted and certified songs ===
List of other charted and certified songs, showing year released and album name
Title	Year	Peak chart positions		Certifications	Album
Title	Year	US Latin	SPA	Certifications	Album
"Me Enamoré" (with DJ Nelson)	2019	—	—	RIAA: Platinum (Latin); PROMUSICAE: Gold	Platónico
"Dime Que Sí" (with DJ Nelson)	2019	—	—	RIAA: Platinum (Latin); PROMUSICAE: Gold	Platónico
"Cuando Fue" (with DJ Nelson and Feid)	2020	—	—	PROMUSICAE: Gold	Platónicos
"La Curiosidad" (with DJ Nelson and Myke Towers)	2020	5	2	RIAA: 8× Platinum (Latin); PROMUSICAE: 7× Platinum	Platónicos
"Eazt"	2022	—	—	RIAA: 3× Platinum (Latin); PROMUSICAE: Gold	El Amor y Yo
"Lugar Seguro" (with Noreh)	2022	—	—	RIAA: Platinum (Latin); PROMUSICAE: Gold	Emociones
"—" denotes a title that was not released or did not chart in that territory.
