= Corazón Roto =

2022 song by Brray

Single by Brray
- Language: Spanish
- Released: September 29, 2022
- Genre: Reggaeton
- Length: 2:27
- Label: Universal Latino
- Songwriters: Brray; Elías de León; LaMoon; Santiago Orrego Gallego; Roberto Felix
- Producer: SOG

Brray singles chronology
"Dame Lu (Remix)" (2022)	"Corazón Roto" (2022)	"Daddy Issues" (2022)

Visualizer
- "Brray - Corazón Roto (Visualizer) " on YouTube

"Corazón Roto" (English: "Broken Heart") is a song recorded by Puerto Rican rapper Brray. The song was released by Universal Music Latino as a single on September 29, 2022, for digital download and streaming. On April 6, 2023, a remixed version of "Corazón Roto" with Puerto Rican singer Jhayco and Colombian artist Ryan Castro was released as single. Another remix entitled "Corazón Roto, Pt. 3", by Brray, Anuel AA and Chencho Corleone, featuring Jhaco and Ryan Castro, was released on September 7, 2023.

== Single release ==
The visualiser of "Corazón Roto" was released on September 29, 2022, on Brray's Youtube channel. The single got certificated Gold by RIAA. "Corazón Roto" is expected to be included in Brray's upcoming album El Alma de la Fiesta.

== Certifications ==
Certifications for "Corazón Roto"
Region	Certification	Certified units/sales
United States (RIAA)	Gold (Latin)	30,000^{‡}
^{‡} Sales+streaming figures based on certification alone.

== Corazón Roto (Remix) ==
"Corazón Roto (Remix)"

Single by Brray, Jhayco and Ryan Castro
- Language: Spanish
- Released: April 6, 2023
- Genre: Reggaeton
- Length: 4:33
- Label: Universal Latino
- Producers: SOG; Tuny D

Brray singles chronology
"Cupido" (2023)	"Corazón Roto (Remix)" (2023)	"Triple H (Remix)" (2023)

Jhayco singles chronology
"Cuerpecito" (2023)	"Corazón Roto (Remix)" (2023)	"Mami Chula" (2023)

Ryan Castro singles chronology
"Desde Antes" (2023)	"Corazón Roto (Remix)" (2023)	"14/20" (2023)

Music video
- "Corazón Roto (Remix)" on YouTube

On April 6, 2023, a remix of the song featuring Puerto Rican artist Jhayco and Colombian artist Ryan Castro was made available worldwide as a single. It was produced by SOG and Tuny D.

=== Music video ===
The music video for remix of "Corazón Roto" was premiered on April 11, 2023, on Brray's YouTube channel and has received more than 150 million views.

=== Charts ===
Chart performance for "Corazón Roto (Remix)"
Chart (2023)	Peak position
Colombia (Promúsica)	9
Honduras (Monitor Latino)	12
Puerto Rico (Monitor Latino)	4
Spain (PROMUSICAE)	10

=== Certifications ===
Certifications for "Corazón Roto (Remix)"
Region	Certification	Certified units/sales
Spain (Promusicae)	3× Platinum	180,000^{‡}

== Corazón Roto, Pt. 3 ==
"Corazón Roto, Pt.3"

Single by Brray, Anuel AA and Chencho Corleone featuring Jhayco and Ryan Castro
- Language: Spanish
- Released: September 7, 2023
- Genre: Reggaeton
- Length: 5:51
- Label: Universal Latino
- Producers: SOG; Tuny D

Brray singles chronology
"ABC" (2023)	"Corazón Roto, Pt.3" (2023)	"Liberty" (2023)

Anuel AA singles chronology
"Pacto (Remix)" (2023)	"Corazón Roto, Pt. 3" (2023)	"Oh Na Na" (2023)

Chencho Corleone singles chronology
"Hora De Salir" (2023)	"Corazón Roto, Pt. 3" (2023)	"Good Times" (2023)

Music video
- "Corazón Roto, Pt. 3" on YouTube

On September 7, 2023, a second remix of the song named "Corazón Roto, Pt. 3" with Puerto Rican rapper Anuel AA and Puerto Rican singer Chencho Corleone featuring Jhayco and Ryan Castro was made available worldwide as a single. It was produced again by SOG and Tuny D.

=== Background and music video ===
After the release of the remix of "Corazón Roto", a made by AI Anuel AA version became viral. It inspired Brray to make a second remix including Anuel AA and Chencho Corleone without taking off Jhay Cortez and Ryan Castro.

The music video for "Corazón Roto, Pt. 3" was premiered on October 5, 2023, on Brray's YouTube channel.

=== Controversy ===
"Corazón Roto, pt. 3" begins with a censored intro showing Anuel AA giving a hint on Karol G and Feid's relationship like in a version made by AI, as he says "Estás con Feid, pero sabes que eres mia". Anuel AA stated that the intro in the official song became uncensored because he doesn't want to bother Brray, Jhayco and Ryan Castro, the official replaced Feid with a Shhh.

=== Commercial performance ===
On April 11, 2024, "Corazón Roto, pt. 3" got a 2× Platinum certification by RIAA.

=== Charts ===
Chart performance for "Corazón Roto, Pt. 3"
Chart (2023)	Peak position
Argentina Hot 100 (Billboard)	59
Chile (Billboard)	20
Colombia (Billboard)	5
Ecuador (Billboard)	6
Peru (Billboard)	12
US Latin Airplay (Billboard)	47
US Latin Rhythm Airplay (Billboard)	19

=== Certifications ===
Certifications for "Corazón Roto, pt. 3"
Region	Certification	Certified units/sales
United States (RIAA)	2× Platinum (Latin)	120,000^{‡}
^{‡} Sales+streaming figures based on certification alone.
