= Coco Chanel (Eladio Carrión and Bad Bunny song) =

Song by Eladio Carrión and Bad Bunny

from the album 3men2 Kbrn
- Language: Spanish
- Released: March 17, 2023
- Genre: Latin trap
- Length: 3:28
- Label: Rimas
- Songwriters: Eladio Carrión Morales; Benito Antonio Martínez Ocasio
- Producers: DVLP; Chosen

Visualizer
- "Coco Chanel" on YouTube

"Coco Chanel" is a song by American rapper Eladio Carrión and Puerto Rican rapper Bad Bunny. It was released on March 17, 2023, through Rimas Entertainment, as the eighth track on Carrión's fourth studio album 3men2 Kbrn (2023). Commercially successful, the song debuted on the Billboard Hot 100 at number 87, marking Carrión's first appearance on the chart.

== Lyrics ==
Titled after and a tribute to Coco Chanel, who founded the Chanel brand, both singers use the lyric "Quiere Coco Chanel, Louis V, Bottega (Coco), yeah." in the song's chorus. Bad Bunny uses lyrics such as "Pero el sol de PR calienta má' que el de Phoenix / Ella lo sabe" in his verse, possibly calling out American basketball player Devin Booker, who was in a relationship with Kendall Jenner. In the same verse, Bad Bunny also mentions Jenner through the lyric "Las de escorpio son peligro." Through the verse, rumors that Bad Bunny was dating Jenner were spreading on social media.

== Accolades ==
Awards and nominations for "Coco Chanel"
Year	Organization	Category	Result	Ref.
2023	Latin Grammy Awards	Best Rap/Hip Hop Song	Won	
2023	Premios Juventud	Best Trap Song	Won	

== Commercial performance ==
Even without being released as a single, "Coco Chanel" debuted at number 87 on the Billboard Hot 100, which marked Carrión's first appearance on the chart, with 6.2 million streams in the United States in its first week. The song would also reach the top 10 in several countries and would peak at number 22 on the Billboard Global 200.

== Charts ==
=== Weekly charts ===
Weekly chart performance for "Coco Chanel"
Chart (2023)	Peak position
Argentina Hot 100 (Billboard)	25
Bolivia (Billboard)	8
Chile (Billboard)	5
Colombia (Billboard)	4
Ecuador (Billboard)	3
Global 200 (Billboard)	22
Mexico (Billboard)	17
Portugal (AFP)	178
Peru (Billboard)	5
Spain (PROMUSICAE)	2
US Billboard Hot 100	87
US Hot Latin Songs (Billboard)	13
US Latin Airplay (Billboard)	42
US Latin Rhythm Airplay (Billboard)	12

=== Year-end charts ===
Year-end chart performance for "Coco Chanel"
Chart (2023)	Position
Global 200 (Billboard)	184
Spain (PROMUSICAE)	32
US Hot Latin Songs (Billboard)	45

== Certifications ==
Certifications and sales for "Coco Chanel"
Region	Certification	Certified units/sales
Spain (Promusicae)	3× Platinum	180,000^{‡}
^{‡} Sales+streaming figures based on certification alone.
