= Blessd =

Colombian singer and rapper (born 2000)

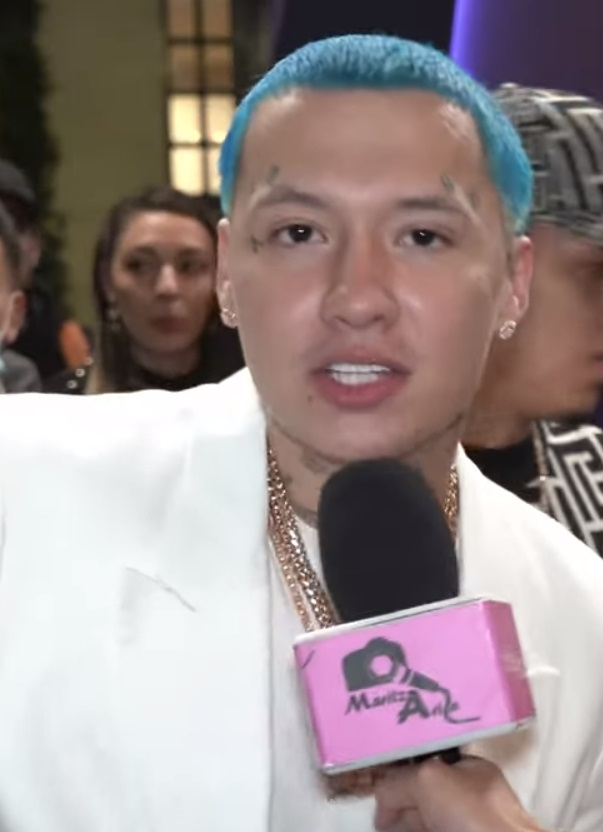
- Blessd at the 2022 Premios Nuestra Tierra

Background information
- Also known as: Blessed; El Bendito; Bendecido
- Born: Stiven Mesa Londoño; January 27, 2000 (age 26); Itagüí, Antioquia, Colombia
- Origin: Medellín, Antioquia, Colombia
- Genres: Reggaeton; Latin trap; Latin R&B
- Occupations: Singer; songwriter; rapper
- Years active: 2018–present
- Labels: JM World Music, Cigol, Warner Music Latina

Stiven Mesa Londoño (born January 27, 2000), known professionally as Blessd, is a Colombian rapper, singer and songwriter. Born in Itagüí, he has worked with well-known artists such as Ovy On The Drums, Karol G, Maluma, Anuel AA, Justin Quiles and Myke Towers.

In October 2021, Blessd signed with Warner Music Latina and released his first studio album, Hecho en Medellín. His most popular song from the album, entitled "Medallo", has reached number 1 in Colombia and has over 100 million views on YouTube. In March 2022, he was nominated for three Heat Latin Music Awards, including Best New Artist, Best Artist – Andean Region and Best Collaboration for the song "Medallo". By 2026 he has become the most streamed Colombian artist on both Spotify and Apple Music multiple times.

== Life and career ==
=== Early life ===
Blessd was born in 2000 in Itagüí, a municipal close to Medellín. His parents separated when he was young and he moved with his mother to live in Bogotá. In an interview with MoluscoTV, he describes his adolescence in Bogotá as difficult because he had a hard time communicating with his stepfather and was far away from the rest of his family. He began to spend a lot of time away from his home and got into many situations he describes as "dangerous". After a fight, he spent a short time in a detention center for minors. This experience made him want to change his path and he decided to return to Medellín. In Medellín he spent his youth selling fruits on the market, thinking that this would genuinely be his primary career, since he came from a family of sellers.

When he returned to Medellín he lived with his maternal grandparents. Before leaving school to pursue his music career, he studied at the Institución Educativa Pedro Estrada.

=== Beginnings (2015–2021) ===
Blessd became interested in music due to the influence of his uncle who was a rapper. His uncle would play songs for him and help him practice freestyling. He began performing as a hobby when he was 15 and competed in rap battles in Bogotá. He was connected to music producer Lil Jay through a friend but did not have very much money. To pay for recording his songs, Blessd would start his day at 2:00 am helping his father and grandparents sell fruits and vegetables in the Central Mayorista de Antioquia in Itagüí. After working with his father in the morning he would go to school and sell candies to his classmates. After school, he would use the little money he made to record sections of his songs.

At first, Blessd was exclusively a rapper and his first songs were shared throughout Medellin using WhatsApp. To reach a wider audience, his producer Lil Jay convinced him to try out Reggaeton and put together some more romantic songs. One of those songs was "Una", which became his first song to go viral in Medellin. Because he did not have any money to shoot a video for "Una", Blessd convinced the owner of Megastore Tienda, a clothing store in Medellin, to invest in the song and help pay for the video. After a month and a half, "Una" became a hit on YouTube and got more than three million plays. After "Una" went viral in Medellin, Blessd began performing in schools and at small concerts. He left school to focus on performing and performed at over 500 schools across Antioquia.

Soon after, he met his manager, Dr. Velasquez, who signed him to the label JM World Music.

In October 2020, Blessd released the song "Viernes Social" with Puerto Rican artists Alexis, Yomo, Amaro and Xantos. The song became the number one song on the radio in Colombia and had more than one million plays in the first 24 hours. In November 2020, Blessd and fellow Colombian Ryan Castro released the song "Lejania". The song was successful not only in Medellin but across Colombia and in Costa Rica.

In January 2021, Blessd released the song "Imposible". After hearing about this song from his best friend, Blessd was contacted by Maluma about joining the song for a remix. He met Maluma for the first time when they filmed the video for "Imposible" Remix at Maluma's home. The remix was produced the Prodigiez, and came out in May 2021.

In the summer of 2021, Blessd released the song "Hace Tiempo". After just one month on YouTube, the song had over 10 million views. In July, he was named by YouTube as a part of their Foundry Class of 2021. In August, Blessd released the remix to his song "Dos Problemas" which featured Puerto Rican singer Javiielo and Venezuelan rappers Big Soto and Neutro Shorty.

=== Hecho en Medellín (2021-2022) ===
In late 2021, Blessd released his first studio album titled Hecho en Medellín which has 10 songs including "Hace Tiempo", "Quien TV" and "Medallo". He completed his first tour in the United States with shows in New Jersey, Massachusetts and Florida. He also completed a tour in Europe where he sang for sold-out crowds in Madrid, Barcelona, Paris, Málaga and Bilbao. Blessd was one of the opening acts for fellow Colombian artist Karol G for her Bichota tour stop in their hometown of Medellín . He sang for the first time in many new cities outside of Colombia including Mexico City, Mexico, Caracas, Venezuela and Guayaquil, Ecuador.

In January 2022, Blessd was nominated for a Lo Nuestro Award in the category "Artista Revelación Masculino" and was highlighted by Billboard as one of 22 Latin "artists to watch" in 2022. Alongside fellow Colombian Ryan Castro, he released two new songs – "Niña de Mis Sueños" and "Quien TV" Remix. The two had not worked together for almost a year after the success of "Lejania" because of differences between Blessd and the record label Castro was signed to concerning the remix of "Lejania". On 14 February, MonitorLatino reported that "Quien TV" Remix had become the most popular song in Colombia and "Niña de Mis Sueños" was charting at number 6 in the country according to Billboard.

=== El Mejor/Peor Hombre Del Mundo and Caleb Mesa (2026-present) ===
In 2026, Blessd released two albums linking to eachother. One titled El Mejor Hombre Del Mundo (EMHDM), the other El Peor Hombre Del Mundo (EPHDM) which both accumulate 26 songs. The album shows that he is the greatest man in the world, depicted in a blue modern mullet style. According to Blessd, he dedicated the album to his mother. The other album shows that he is the worst, being the direct contrary to EMHDM where he wears dark clothes with short, black hair.

With EPHDM Blessd announced that he is laying off his blue hair, because he fears hair damage. EPHDM started the album with the intro "Mente Positiva" where he introduced that he now has a son named Caleb Mesa. It was a tough year for Blessd and his partner Manuela QM, after multiple fallouts they have finally gotten back together. During 2026 he has released a massive number of singles, featuring artists like Anuel AA for Capcana Cocoa or Fanta Rosario for MALA. In that same year he completed his America tour, touring North and South America. His journey took him to Mexico, where he performed for 55,000 people in a sold out arena, aiming for Europe in the next calendar year.

== Personal life ==
Blessd is a Catholic who learned about religion from his grandmother. His name originates from one of his tattoos he got when he was just 12 years old. "Blessings" was the main motive of his tattoo, when he got it tattooed by his cousin, people at school started calling him "Blessed" or "Blessings". After kicking this off with the name "TNMC" he was motivated by the name-calling and decided to go with Blessd. He has many tattoos of religious imagery such as Jesus and The Virgin Mary on his arm and a cross on the back of his neck. He also has the word "bendito", which means blessed, tattooed across his fingers. He is often photographed before his performances on his knees praying with his team.

When asked about his inspirations, Blessd credits American singer and rapper Arcángel, his favorite Colombian rapper Crudo Means Raw and Venezuelan rapper Akapellah. He is also inspired by the Colombian artists he grew up listening to with his grandparents such as vallenato singer Diomedes Diaz and salsa singer Joe Arroyo.

For a few years, Blessd dated Colombian influencer Nicole Rivera, who is known on social media as La Suprema. She appears alongside him in the video for his song "Confia en Mi". He confirmed the end of their relationship in on 15 March 2022, via Twitter.

Blessd is a fan of football, he supports his hometown club Atlético Nacional as he has a tattoo of the club’s badge and at one point the club even incorporated his logo onto the club’s kits. Blessd is also a fan of F.C. Barcelona. In October 2024 he became part-owner of the Danish football club Vendsyssel FF. On 15 December 2024, Blessd released “Himno de la grandeza” (Hymn of greatness), a song that portrayed his love and respect for Atlético Nacional.

== Discography ==
=== Studio albums ===
Title	Details	Peak chart positions		COLOMBIA	COLOMBIA	Certifications
Title	Details	SPA	US Latin	Apple Music	Spotify	Certifications
Hecho en Medellín	Release date: 27 October 2021; Label: JM World Music, Cigol, Warner Music Latina; Formats: Digital download, streaming	—	—	Top 10	Top 10	RIAA: Gold (Latin)
Siempre Blessd	Release date: 3 November 2022; Label: JM World, Cigol, Warner Latina; Formats: Digital download, streaming	51	—	180	179	RIAA: Platinum (Latin)
Si Sabe	Release date: 25 January 2024; Label: Cigol, Warner Latina; Formats: Digital download, streaming	95	29	Top 10	Top 10	RIAA: Gold (Latin)
BlessDeluxury	Release date: 16 May 2024; Label: Cigol, Warner Latina; Formats: Digital download, streaming	—	—	162	113	
TRINIDAD BENDITA	Release date: 2 June 2025; Label: Cigol, Warner Latina; Formats: Digital download, streaming	32	47	34	14	
EL MEJOR HOMBRE DEL MUNDO	Release date: 9 April 2026; Label: Cigol, Warner Latina; Formats: Digital download, streaming			74	44	
EL PEOR HOMBRE DEL MUNDO	Release date: 19 June 2026; Label: Cigol, Warner Latina; Formats: Digital download, streaming			Top 5	Top 5	

=== Charting songs ===
List of charting songs, with selected chart positions, showing year released and album name
Title	Year	Peak chart positions									Certifications	Album
Title	Year	COL	ARG	CR	ECU	PAR	PER	SPA	US Latin	WW	Certifications	Album
"Lejania"	2020	25	—	—	—	—	—	—	—	—		Non-album single
"Medallo" (with Lenny Tavárez and Justin Quiles)	2021	1	27	10	16	14	1	27	22	80	PROMUSICAE: Gold; RIAA: Platinum (Latin)	Hecho en Medellín
"Hace Tiempo"	2021	8	—	—	—	—	—	—	—	—		Hecho en Medellín
"Imposible" (remix) (with Maluma)	2021	64	—	—	—	1	—	—	—	—	RIAA: Platinum (Latin)	Non-album singles
"Dos Problemas" (remix) (with Big Soto, Neutro Shorty and Javiielo)	2021	30	—	—	—	—	—	81	—	—		Non-album singles
"Quien TV" (remix) (with Ryan Castro)	2022	1	—	—	—	—	—	—	—	—		Non-album singles
"Niña de Mis Sueños" (with Ryan Castro)	2022	6	—	—	—	—	—	—	—	—		Non-album singles
"Si Sabe Ferxxo" (with Feid)	2024	2	—	—	11	—	—	21	40	—	PROMUSICAE: Gold	Si Sabe
"Mírame" (with Ovy on the Drums)	2024	1	38	—	2	—	7	28	13	58	RIAA: Gold (Latin); PROMUSICAE: Gold	Non-album singles
"WYA (Remix Black and Yellow)" (with J Abdiel and Anuel AA featuring iZaak and Pirlo)	2024	—	10	—	—	—	—	—	65	—	RIAA: Gold (Latin)	Non-album singles
"Yogurcito"	2025	—	—	—	—	—	—	—	—	92		Non-album singles
"Yogurcito" Remix	2025	1										
"—" denotes that chart information is unavailable or a recording that did not chart in that territory.

=== Singles ===
List of singles as lead artist, showing year released and album name
Title	Year	Album
"Una"	2019	Non-album singles
"Pensando En Ti"	2019	Non-album singles
"Mala Fama"	2020	Non-album singles
"Morena"	2020	Non-album singles
"Cuéntale"	2020	Non-album singles
"Confía En Mí"	2020	Non-album singles
"Infiel"	2020	Non-album singles
"Clandestino"	2020	Non-album singles
"El Bendito"	2020	Non-album singles
"Viernes Social" (with Yomo, Xantos, Alexis Mr. A, and Amaro)	2020	Non-album singles
"Unica"	2020	Non-album singles
"Lejania" (with Ryan Castro)	2020	Non-album singles
"Imposible"	2021	Non-album singles
"Mi Nina"	2021	Non-album singles
"Dos Problemas"	2021	Non-album singles
"De Todo"	2021	Non-album singles
"Dos Problemas" Remix (with Big Soto, Neutro Shorty and Javiielo)	2021	Non-album singles
"Imposible" Remix (with Maluma)	2021	Non-album singles
"De Buena" (with Sael)	2021	Non-album singles
"Hace Tiempo"	2021	Hecho en Medellín
"La Oportunidad"	2021	Non-album singles
"Quien TV" Remix (with Ryan Castro)	2022	Non-album singles
"Tendencia Global" (with Myke Towers)	2022	Non-album singles

List of singles as a featured artist, showing lead artist, year released and album name
Title	Lead Artist	Year	Album
"Royal Medellin"	SOG	2020	Non-album singles
"Barrio"	Ultrajala	2020	Non-album singles
"La DT"	Kapla y Miky	2021	Non-album singles
"Shake Ya Boom Boom"	Static and Ben El Tavori	2021	Non-album singles
"Pasajero"	SOG	2021	Non-album singles
"Mal Mal Mal"	Nanpa Básico	2021	Non-album singles
"Te Extraño"	Piso 21	2021	Non-album singles
"Adicto"	Chesca	2021	Non-album singles
"Horóscopo"	Javiielo	2021	Non-album singles
"Parcera"	Maxiolly	2021	Non-album singles
"L.N.E.M. (Gata)"	Maluma	2021	Non-album singles
"Ganas" Remix	El Clooy	2021	Non-album singles
"Ropa Interior"	Mike Bahía	2021	Contento
"Dile La Verdad"	Big Soto	2021	The Good Trip Deluxe
"Dónde Estás"	Jamby El Favo	2021	Flow Futurama, Vol. 2
"Niña de Mis Sueños"	Ryan Castro	2022	Non-album singles
"Enchulao"	Beéle	2022	Non-album singles

=== Other charted songs ===
List of songs, with selected chart positions, showing year released and album name
Title	Year	Peaks	Album
Title	Year	COL	Album
"Condenado al Exito II"	2024	7	Si Sabe
"Sornerito"	2024	24	Si Sabe
"A2P" (with Pirlo, Yovngchimi, Neutro Shorty, NLE Choppa and Foreign Teck)	2024	25	Si Sabe

== Awards and nominations ==
Awards	Year	Recipient(s) and nominee(s)	Category	Result	Ref.
Latin American Music Awards	2023	Himself	New Artist of the Year	Nominated	
Latin American Music Awards	2023	"Medallo" (with Justin Quiles & Lenny Tavárez)	Collaboration of the Year	Nominated	
Latin American Music Awards	2023	"Medallo" (with Justin Quiles & Lenny Tavárez)	Best Collaboration – Pop/Urban	Nominated	
MTV Europe Music Awards	2023	Himself	Best Latin America Central Act	Nominated	
MTV Europe Music Awards	2024	Himself	Best Latin America Central Act	Nominated	
MTV MIAW Awards	2022	Himself	Best New Artist	Nominated	
Premios Juventud	2022	Himself	The New Generation – Male	Nominated	
Premios Juventud	2022	"Medallo" (with Justin Quiles & Lenny Tavárez)	Viral Track of the Year	Nominated	
Premios Juventud	2023	Himself	Male Artist – On The Rise	Nominated	
Premios Lo Nuestro	2022	Himself	New Artist – Male	Nominated	
Premios Lo Nuestro	2023	"Medallo" (with Justin Quiles & Lenny Tavárez)	Song of the Year	Nominated	
Premios Lo Nuestro	2023	"Medallo" (with Justin Quiles & Lenny Tavárez)	Urban Collaboration of the Year	Nominated	
Premios Lo Nuestro	2024	"Instagram"	Urban Song of the Year	Nominated	
Premios Nuestra Tierra	2022	Himself	Artist of the Year	Nominated	
Premios Nuestra Tierra	2022	Himself	New Artist of the Year	Nominated	
Premios Nuestra Tierra	2022	Himself	Best Urban Artist	Nominated	
Premios Nuestra Tierra	2023	Siempre Blessd	Album of the Year	Nominated	
Premios Nuestra Tierra	2023	"Quien TV (Remix)" (with Ryan Castro)	Best Urban Song	Nominated	
Premios Nuestra Tierra	2023	"Medallo" (with Justin Quiles & Lenny Tavárez)	Best Urban Collaboration	Nominated	
Premios Nuestra Tierra	2023	"Instagram"	Best Video	Nominated	
Premios Nuestra Tierra	2024	Himself	Best Urban Artist	Nominated	
Premios Nuestra Tierra	2024	"Ojitos Rojos (Remix)" (with Ryan Castro & SOG)	Best Urban Collaboration	Nominated	
