= Eladio Carrión =

American rapper (born 1994)

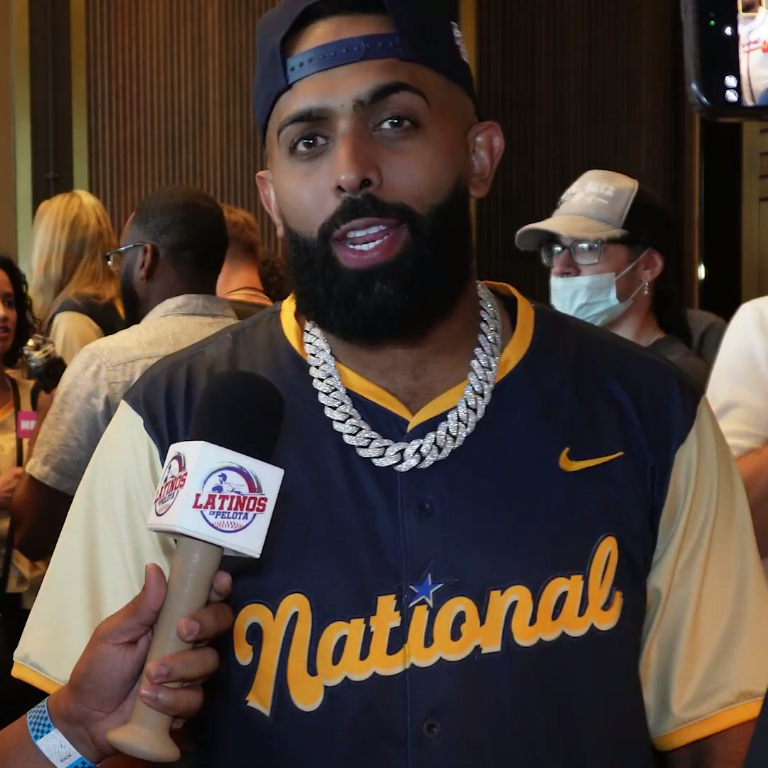
- Eladio Carrión at the 2025 All-Star Legends & Celebrity Softball Game

Background information
- Born: November 14, 1994 (age 31); Kansas City, Kansas, U.S.
- Origin: Humacao, Puerto Rico
- Genres: Latin trap; Latin R&B; reggaeton; dancehall
- Occupations: Rapper; songwriter
- Instrument: Vocals
- Years active: 2015–present
- Label: Rimas
- Website: eladiocarrion.com

Eladio Carrión Morales (born November 14, 1994) is an American rapper and songwriter of Latin trap and reggaeton. In 2023, he won the Latin Grammy for Best Rap/Hip Hop Song for "Me Gustas Natural".

== Biography ==
Eladio Carrión Morales was born on November 14, 1994, in Kansas City, Kansas, into a Puerto Rican family. As his father was in the U.S. military, they frequently moved from state to state. By the time he was a teenager, Carrión had lived in Hawaii, Baltimore (Maryland) and the state of New York, as well as Alaska. At age 11, his family relocated back to Humacao, Puerto Rico. In his youth, he showed athletic promise, notably excelling in swimming, going on to represent Puerto Rico at the 2010 Central American and Caribbean Games. Carrión also represented his country at the 2011 Pan American Games in Guadalajara, México, where he would reach the preliminary phase of the 200-meter breaststroke, finishing in eighth position overall.

== Career ==
=== Influencer ===
Shortly after 2012 began, Carrión abandoned swimming to begin his artistic career as an influencer through digital platforms (such as Vine and Instagram), in which he uploaded comedic videos to gain followers.

=== Musical artist ===
==== Beginning ====
In 2015 Carrión released his first musical work "2x2" in collaboration with Flowsito. Then he released his second musical work "No Quiero Más Amigos Nuevos" belonging to Rawenz, these works allowed him to become known in the music industry. In 2016 he worked with Jon Z and the Argentine rapper Neo Pistea on the single "Súbelo" that became popular in nightclubs and again with Rawenz on "Si Te Vas, Vete".

==== 2017–2019: "Mi Cubana" and collaborations ====
In 2017 Carrión officially debuted as a singer with the single "Me Enamoré de una Yal" with Ele A el Dominio and Ñengo Flow, under the Los de la Nazza record label, which reached the top positions on SoundCloud and Spotify.

In 2018 Carrión collaborated on the singles "Dame una Hora" with Amenazzy, "Mi Cubana" which had a resounding success that led him to obtain a remix with Cazzu, Khea and Ecko, and "Sigue Bailándome" with Myke Towers, Darkiel, Brray and Yann C.

In 2019 he was again collaborating with artists such as Rauw Alejandro in "Dice Que No", Ñejo in "Periódico de Ayer", Noriel "Se Moja" and his most important collaboration was with the Spanish rapper Maikel Delacalle in "Si Tú Me Quisieras". In that same year, after making several collaborations, he was nominated for the Premios Juventud in the category of Nueva generación urbana, this being his first nomination for a musical award.

==== 2020: Sauce Boyz ====
On January 31, 2020, Carrión released his debut album Sauce Boyz under the Rimas Entertainment label, which ranked #8 on the Billboard Top Latin Albums for 10 consecutive weeks, it was then followed by an EP Sauce Boyz Care Package. In that same year he was nominated for the Latin Grammy Awards in the category of Best Rap/Hip Hop Song for his joint collaboration with Bad Bunny on the single "Kemba Walker".

==== 2021–present: Monarca, Sauce Boyz 2, 3men2 Kbrn and Sol Maria ====
On January 8, 2021, Carrión released his album Monarca, which includes collaborations with J Balvin, Yandel, Cazzu and Lunay; the album peaked at #11 on the Top Latin Albums chart and #8 on the Latin Rhythm Albums chart. The record also earned Carrión a Latin Grammy nomination in the category of Mejor Álbum de Música Urbana (best urban music album).

On June 9, Carrión collaborated with noted Argentine songwriter and producer Bizarrap on the track "Eladio Carrión: Bzrp Music Sessions, Vol. 40" which reached #10 on the Billboard Argentina Hot 100 list, and #162 at the global level. It was also certified gold by the PROMUSICAE of Spain. On July 6 of that same year, he released his first mixtape titled Sen2 Kbrn, Vol. 1, featuring singles such as "5 Star", "Guerrero", and "Sauce Boy Freestyle 4", among others. It peaked at #20 on the Billboard Top Latin Albums chart.

On December 2, 2021, Carrión released his third studio album, Sauce Boyz 2 (a ‘sequel’ to Sauce Boyz), featuring collaborations with numerous international artists, including Arcángel, Bizarrap, Duki, Jay Wheeler, Jon Z, Karol G, Luar la L, Rels B, Sech, Myke Towers, Nicky Jam, Noriel, and Ovi.

On March 17, 2023, Carrión released his fourth album; 3men2 Kbrn where he showcased collaborations with a diverse array of artists such as 50 Cent, Lil Wayne, Future, Bad Bunny, and Myke Towers. This album marked a significant moment for the Puerto Rican rapper representing a new and vibrant trend in Latin trap, gaining significant recognition in the media. Furthermore, his Latin Grammy victory was secured through the dynamic collaboration with Bad Bunny on the track "Coco Chanel."

On January 19, 2024, Carrión released his fifth album, Sol María. Carrión's career reached a pivotal moment with the release of his album "Sol María," marking a departure from his signature trap style towards a more intimate and diverse sound. Dedicated to his mother, the album delves into personal topics, showcasing Carrión's vulnerability and authenticity. With tracks like "Mamá’s Boy" and "Luchas Mentales," Carrión explores deep emotional territory, offering listeners insight into his experiences and struggles. The guest list is carefully curated to complement the album's essence, reflecting Carrión's musical influences and current inspirations. "Sol María" stands as Carrión's most intimate and rewarding project to date, providing a heartfelt tribute to his biggest supporter while resonating with audiences on a deeply personal level.

Carrión performed at Latino Gang Festival in July 2022, in The Netherlands.

Carrión performed at the 22nd Coachella Valley Music and Arts Festival in April 2023.

Carrión performed at 2023’s Baja Beach Fest in August 2023, in Rosarito, Baja California. Carrión performed in La velada del año organized by YouTuber Ibai twice years in a row.

== Filmography ==
=== Film ===
Year	Title	Role	Notes	Ref.
2026	72 Hours	Eladio Carrión	Limo scene	

== Discography ==
- Sauce Boyz (2020)
- Monarca (2021)
- Sen2 Kbrn, Vol. 1 (2021)
- Sauce Boyz 2 (2021)
- Sen2 Kbrn, Vol. 2 (2022)
- 3men2 Kbrn (2023)
- Sol María (2024)
- Don Kbrn (2025)
- Corsa (2026)

== Awards and nominations ==
Award	Year	Category	Nomination	Results	Ref.
Billboard Latin Music Awards	2023	Latin Rhythm Album of the Year	3MEN2 KBRN	Nominated	
Heat Latin Music Awards	2022	Best Urban Artist	Himself	Nominated	
Heat Latin Music Awards	2022	Best Collaboration	"No Te Deseo El Mal" (with Karol G)	Nominated	
Heat Latin Music Awards	2023	Best Urban Artist	Himself	Nominated	
Latin American Music Awards	2024	Album of the Year	3MEN2 KBRN	Nominated	
Latin Grammy Awards	2020	Best Rap/Hip Hop Song	"Kemba Walker" (with Bad Bunny)	Nominated	
Latin Grammy Awards	2021	Best Urban Music Album	Monarca	Nominated	
Latin Grammy Awards	2023	Best Urban Music Album	3MEN2 KBRN	Nominated	
Latin Grammy Awards	2023	Best Rap/Hip Hop Song	"Coco Chanel" (with Bad Bunny)	Won	
Latin Grammy Awards	2024	Best Urban Music Album	Sol María	Nominated	
Latin Grammy Awards	2024	Best Rap/Hip Hop Song	"Bendecido"	Nominated	
Latin Grammy Awards	2024	Best Rap/Hip Hop Song	"Thunder y Lightning" (with Bad Bunny)	Nominated	
Latin Grammy Awards	2025	Best Rap/Hip Hop Song	"El Favorito de Mami" (with Big Soto)	Pending	
MTV Europe Music Awards	2023	Best Caribbean Act	Himself	Nominated	
MTV Europe Music Awards	2023	Best Caribbean Act	Himself	Nominated	
MTV Millennial Awards	2022	Flow Artist	Himself	Nominated	
MTV Millennial Awards	2023	Flow Artist	Himself	Nominated	
Premios Lo Nuestro	2023	Urban Album of the Year	Sauce Boyz 2	Nominated	
Premios Lo Nuestro	2024	Male Urban Artist of the Year	Himself	Nominated	
Premios Lo Nuestro	2024	Song of the Year	"Nunca y Pico" (with Yandel & Maluma)	Nominated	
Premios Lo Nuestro	2024	Urban Collaboration of the Year	"Nunca y Pico" (with Yandel & Maluma)	Nominated	
Premios Lo Nuestro	2024	Urban Album of the Year	3MEN2 KBRN	Nominated	
Premios Lo Nuestro	2025	Male Urban Artist of the Year	Himself	Nominated	
Premios Lo Nuestro	2025	Best Urban Trap/Hip Hop Song	"Si, si, si, si" (with Justin Quiles, Sech, Lenny Tavárez, Dalex, Dímelo Flow, Bryant Myers & Dei V)	Nominated	
Premios Lo Nuestro	2025	Urban Album of the Year	Porque Puedo	Nominated	
Premios Lo Nuestro	2026	Male Urban Artist of the Year	Himself	Nominated	
Premios Lo Nuestro	2026	Best Trap/Hip-Hop Song of the Year	“Primer Lugar” (with Omar Courtz)	Nominated	
Premios Lo Nuestro	2026	Urban Collaboration of the Year	“Amg” (with Young Miko)	Nominated	
Premios Lo Nuestro	2026	Urban Album of the Year	Don Kbrn	Nominated	
Premios Juventud	2019	New Urban Generation (Best New Urban Artist)	Himself	Nominated	
Premios Juventud	2022	Male Artist On The Rise	Himself	Nominated	
Premios Juventud	2023	Male Artist On The Rise	Himself	Nominated	
Premios Juventud	2023	OMG Collaboration	"Si Salimos" (with 50 Cent)	Nominated	
Premios Juventud	2023	Best Urban Mix	"Nunca y Pico" (with Yandel & Maluma)	Nominated	
Premios Juventud	2023	Best Male Urban Album	3MEN2 KBRN	Nominated	
Premios Juventud	2023	Best Trap Song	"Coco Chanel" (with Bad Bunny)	Won	
Premios Juventud	2024	Best Urban Album	Sol María	Nominated	
Premios Tu Musica Urbano	2020	Urban Top - Puerto Rico	Himself	Nominated	
Premios Tu Musica Urbano	2020	Remix of the Year - New Generation	"Mi Error (Remix)" (with Zion & Lennox, Wisin & Yandel & Lunay)	Nominated	
Premios Tu Musica Urbano	2022	Top Artist - Trap	Himself	Nominated	
Premios Tu Musica Urbano	2022	Top Song - Trap	"No Te Deseo El Mal" (with Karol G)	Won	
Premios Tu Musica Urbano	2022	Top Song - Trap	"Eladio Carrión: Bzrp Music Sessions, Vol.40"	Nominated	
Premios Tu Musica Urbano	2023	Top Rising Star - Male	Himself	Won	
Premios Tu Musica Urbano	2023	Top Artist -Trap	Himself	Nominated	
Premios Tu Musica Urbano	2023	Remix of the Year	"Si La Calle Llama (Remix)" (with Myke Towers)	Nominated	
Premios Tu Musica Urbano	2023	Top Song - Trap	"Mbappé"	Nominated	
Premios Tu Musica Urbano	2023	Top Song - Trap	"Coco Chanel" (with Bad Bunny)	Nominated	
Premios Tu Musica Urbano	2023	Album of the Year – New Artist	Sen2 Kbrn VOL. 2	Won	
Premios Tu Musica Urbano	2025	On The Road - Male	Himself	Nominated	
Premios Tu Musica Urbano	2025	Top Artist -Trap	Himself	Nominated	
Premios Tu Musica Urbano	2025	Top Song - Trap	"Si, si, si, si" (with Justin Quiles, Sech, Lenny Tavárez, Dalex, Dímelo Flow, Bryant Myers & Dei V)	Nominated	
Premios Tu Musica Urbano	2025	Top Song - Trap	"H.I.M."	Nominated	
SESAC Latina Music Awards	2023	Award Winning Songs	"Alejarme de Ti" (with Jay Wheeler)	Won	
SESAC Latina Music Awards	2024	Award Winning Songs	"Coco Chanel" (with Bad Bunny)	Won	
