= List of awards and nominations received by Karol G =

Karol G awards and nominations
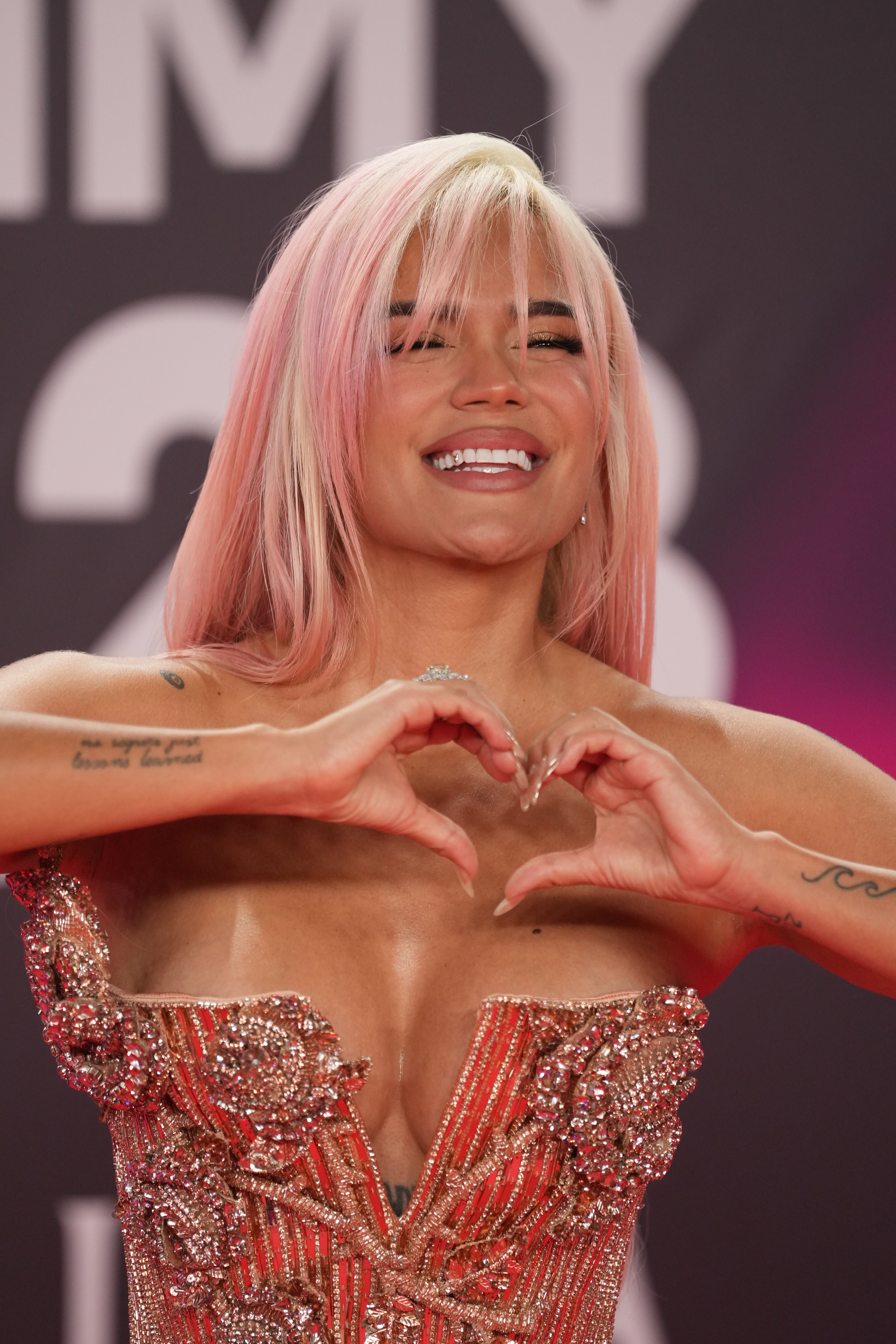
- Karol G at the 2023 Latin Grammys
Awards and nominations
Award	Wins	Nominations
American Music Awards	3	14
Billboard Music Awards	5	16
Billboard Latin Music Awards	25	68
Guinness World Records	11	11
Grammy Awards	1	5
iHeartRadio Music Awards	5	18
Latin American Music Awards	23	36
Latin Grammy Awards	8	28
MTV Europe Music Awards	3	9
MTV Video Music Awards	1	11
People's Choice Awards	0	9
Premios Juventud	33	56
Premios Lo Nuestro	30	57

Totals (Note: Certain award groups do not simply award one winner. They acknowledge several different recipients, have runners-up, and have third place. Since this is a specific recognition and is different from losing an award, runner-up mentions are considered wins in this award tally. For simplification and to avoid errors, each award in this list has been presumed to have had a prior nomination.)
- Wins: 298
- Nominations: 700

Karol G is a Colombian singer and songwriter. She has received several awards and nominations including eight Latin Grammy Awards, one Grammy Award, five Billboard Music Awards, two MTV Europe Music Awards, one American Music Award and eighteen Premios Lo Nuestro, among others.

In 2017, she released her first studio album titled Unstoppable, the following year she won the Latin Grammy Award for Best New Artist. Her second album Ocean was released in 2019, the same year she participated in the song "China" alongside reggaeton singers Anuel AA, Daddy Yankee, Ozuna and J Balvin, the song was commercially successful and was nominated for two Latin Grammy Awards, for Record of the Year and Best Urban Fusion/Performance. In 2019, she released the song "Tusa" featuring rapper Nicki Minaj, the song was highly successful and received two Latin Grammy nominations, including Song of the Year, it also won three Latin American Music Awards and was nominated for five Billboard Latin Music Awards and two MTV Video Music Awards.

In 2021, she released her third album, KG0516, the album was nominated for the Grammy Award for Best Música Urbana Album, being her first Grammy Award nomination, it also won a Billboard Music Award and two Latin American Music Awards. The album includes the single "Bichota", which won the Latin Grammy Award for Best Reggaeton Performance in 2021, being her second Latin Grammy win. During 2022, she released two commercially successful singles, "Mamiii" with Becky G, which got five nominations at the 2022 Billboard Latin Music Awards, and "Provenza", which received nominations for both Song of the Year and Record of the Year at the 23rd Annual Latin Grammy Awards.

In 2023 she published her fourth studio album Mañana Será Bonito which with its songs garnered seven nominations at the 24th Annual Latin Grammy Awards, winning three awards, including Album of the Year and Best Urban Music Album. The collaboration "TQG" with Shakira which received three nominations at the Latin Grammy Awards for Song of the Year, Best Urban Song and Best Urban Fusion/Performance, winning the latter. At the 66th Annual Grammy Awards the album won Best Música Urbana Album, being Karol G's first Grammy Award.

== Major associations ==
=== Guinness World Records ===
Year	Category	Nominated work	Result	Ref.
2022	Most Billboard Latin Music Awards nominations for a female artist in a single year (15)	Karol G	Won	
2023	Most simultaneous entries on the US singles chart by a female Latin artist (11)	Karol G	Won	
2023	Most streamed Latin album on Spotify in one week (female)	Mañana Será Bonito	Won	
2023	Most streamed Latin album on Spotify in 24 hours (female)	Mañana Será Bonito	Won	
2023	First female vocalist to reach No.1 on the Billboard 200 with an all-Spanish-language album	Mañana Será Bonito	Won	
2023	Highest-charting Spanish-language track on the Billboard Hot 100 (female)	"TQG" (with Shakira)	Won	
2024	First female winner of the Best Música Urbana Album Grammy Award	Karol G	Won	
2024	Highest-grossing music tour by a Latin female artist ($313,000,000)	Mañana Será Bonito Tour	Won	
2025	Most entries on Billboard's Hot Latin Songs chart by a female artist (67)	Karol G	Won	
2025	Most weeks at No.1 on Billboard's Latin Airplay chart (one song) (26 weeks)	"Si Antes Te Hubiera Conocido"	Won	

=== Grammy Awards ===
Year	Category	Nominated work	Result	Ref.
2022	Best Música Urbana Album	KG0516	Nominated	
2024	Best Música Urbana Album	Mañana Será Bonito	Won	
2026	Best Latin Pop Album	Tropicoqueta	Nominated	
2027	Best Latin Pop Album	No Me Arrepiento de Sentir Tanto	Pending	
2027	Best Latin Song	"Ahí"	Pending	

=== Latin Grammy Awards ===
Year	Nominated Work	Category	Result	Ref.
2018	Karol G	Best New Artist	Won	
2018	"Mi Cama"	Best Urban Song	Nominated	
2020	"China" (with Anuel AA, Daddy Yankee, Ozuna and J Balvin)	Best Urban Fusion/Performance	Nominated	
2020	"China" (with Anuel AA, Daddy Yankee, Ozuna and J Balvin)	Record of the Year	Nominated	
2020	"Tusa" (with Nicki Minaj)	Record of the Year	Nominated	
2020	"Tusa" (with Nicki Minaj)	Song of the Year	Nominated	
2021	"Bichota"	Best Reggaeton Performance	Won	
2022	"Provenza"	Record of the Year	Nominated	
2022	"Provenza"	Song of the Year	Nominated	
2022	"Mamiii" (with Becky G)	Best Urban Song	Nominated	
2023	Mañana Será Bonito	Album of the Year	Won	
2023	Mañana Será Bonito	Best Urban Music Album	Won	
2023	"Mientras Me Curo del Cora"	Record of the Year	Nominated	
2023	"TQG" (with Shakira)	Song of the Year	Nominated	
2023	"TQG" (with Shakira)	Best Urban Fusion/Performance	Won	
2023	"TQG" (with Shakira)	Best Urban Song	Nominated	
2023	"Gatúbela" (with Maldy)	Best Reggaeton Performance	Nominated	
2024	Mañana Será Bonito (Bichota Season)	Album of the Year	Nominated	
2024	Mañana Será Bonito (Bichota Season)	Best Urban Music Album	Won	
2024	"Mi Ex Tenía Razón"	Record of the Year	Nominated	
2024	"Mi Ex Tenía Razón"	Song of the Year	Nominated	
2024	"S91"	Best Urban Fusion/Performance	Nominated	
2024	"Labios Mordidos" (with Kali Uchis)	Best Reggaeton Performance	Nominated	
2024	"Qlona" (with Peso Pluma)	Best Reggaeton Performance	Nominated	
2024	"Qlona" (with Peso Pluma)	Best Urban Song	Nominated	
2025	"Si Antes Te Hubiera Conocido"	Record of the Year	Nominated	
2025	"Si Antes Te Hubiera Conocido"	Song of the Year	Won	
2025	"Si Antes Te Hubiera Conocido"	Best Tropical Song	Won	
2026	Tropicoqueta	Album of the Year	Nominated	
2026	Tropicoqueta	Best Urban Music Album	Won	
2026	"Coleccionando Heridas" (with Marco Antonio Solis)	Record of the Year	Nominated	
2026	"Coleccionando Heridas" (with Marco Antonio Solis)	Song of the Year	Nominated	
2026	"Ese Hombre es Malo"	Best Regional Mexican Song	Nominated	
2026	"Dile Luna" (with Eddy Lover)	Best Urban Performance	Nominated	
2026	"Verano Rosa" (with Feid)	Best Reggaeton Performance	Won	

== Miscellaneous awards ==
Name of the award ceremony, year presented, recipient of the award, category and result
Award	Year (Note: Indicates the year of ceremony. Each year is linked to the article about the awards held that year, wherever possible.)	Recipient(s) and nominee(s)	Category	Result	Ref.
American Music Awards	2020	Karol G	Favorite Female Latin Artist	Nominated	
American Music Awards	2020	"Tusa" (with Nicki Minaj)	Favorite Song – Latin	Won	
American Music Awards	2021	Karol G	Favorite Female Latin Artist	Nominated	
American Music Awards	2021	KG0516	Favorite Album – Latin	Nominated	
American Music Awards	2022	Karol G	Favorite Female Latin Artist	Nominated	
American Music Awards	2022	"Provenza"	Favorite Latin Song	Nominated	
American Music Awards	2022	"Mamiii" (with Becky G)	Favorite Latin Song	Nominated	
American Music Awards	2025	"Si Antes Te Hubiera Conocido"	Favorite Music Video	Nominated	
American Music Awards	2025	"Si Antes Te Hubiera Conocido"	Favorite Latin Song	Nominated	
American Music Awards	2025	Karol G	Favorite Female Latin Artist	Nominated	
American Music Awards	2026	Karol G	Favorite Female Latin Artist	Nominated	
American Music Awards	2026	Karol G	International Artist Award of Excellence	Won	
American Music Awards	2026	Tropicoqueta	Best Latin Album	Won	
American Music Awards	2026	"Latina Foreva"	Best Latin Song	Nominated	
ASCAP Latin Music Awards	2019	"Mi Cama"	Winning Song (Note: Awards and nominations Giraldo has received as songwriter.)	Won	
Billboard Latin Music Awards	2018	Karol G	Top Latin Albums Artist of the Year, Female	Nominated	
Billboard Latin Music Awards	2019	Karol G	Top Latin Albums Artist of the Year, Female	Nominated	
Billboard Latin Music Awards	2019	Karol G	New Artist of the Year	Nominated	
Billboard Latin Music Awards	2019	Karol G	Hot Latin Songs Artist of the Year, Female	Nominated	
Billboard Latin Music Awards	2020	Karol G	Hot Latin Songs Artist of the Year, Female	Won	
Billboard Latin Music Awards	2020	Karol G	Top Latin Albums Artist of the Year, Female	Won	
Billboard Latin Music Awards	2020	"China" (with Anuel AA, Daddy Yankee, Ozuna and J Balvin)	Airplay Song of the Year	Nominated	
Billboard Latin Music Awards	2021	Karol G	Hot Latin Songs Artist of the Year, Female	Won	
Billboard Latin Music Awards	2021	Karol G	Top Latin Albums Artist of the Year, Female	Won	
Billboard Latin Music Awards	2021	"Tusa" (with Nicki Minaj)	Hot Latin Song of the Year	Nominated	
Billboard Latin Music Awards	2021	"Tusa" (with Nicki Minaj)	Vocal Event Hot Latin Song of the Year	Nominated	
Billboard Latin Music Awards	2021	"Tusa" (with Nicki Minaj)	Sales Song of the Year	Nominated	
Billboard Latin Music Awards	2021	"Tusa" (with Nicki Minaj)	Latin Rhythm Song of the Year	Nominated	
Billboard Latin Music Awards	2021	"Tusa" (with Nicki Minaj)	Airplay Song of the Year	Nominated	
Billboard Latin Music Awards	2021	"Caramelo" (Remix) (with Ozuna and Myke Towers)	Airplay Song of the Year	Nominated	
Billboard Latin Music Awards	2022	Karol G	Artist of the Year	Nominated	
Billboard Latin Music Awards	2022	Karol G	Hot Latin Songs Artist of the Year, Female	Won	
Billboard Latin Music Awards	2022	Karol G	Top Latin Albums Artist of the Year, Female	Won	
Billboard Latin Music Awards	2022	Karol G	Latin Rhythm Artist of the Year, Solo	Nominated	
Billboard Latin Music Awards	2022	"Mamiii" (with Becky G)	Hot Latin Song of the Year	Nominated	
Billboard Latin Music Awards	2022	"Mamiii" (with Becky G)	Hot Latin Song of the Year, Vocal Event	Won	
Billboard Latin Music Awards	2022	"Mamiii" (with Becky G)	Airplay Song of the Year	Nominated	
Billboard Latin Music Awards	2022	"Mamiii" (with Becky G)	Latin Rhythm Song of the Year	Nominated	
Billboard Latin Music Awards	2022	"Mamiii" (with Becky G)	Latin Pop Song of the Year	Nominated	
Billboard Latin Music Awards	2022	"Provenza"	Latin Pop Song of the Year	Nominated	
Billboard Latin Music Awards	2022	KG0516	Top Latin Album of the Year	Nominated	
Billboard Latin Music Awards	2022	KG0516	Latin Rhythm Album of the Year	Nominated	
Billboard Latin Music Awards	2023	Karol G	Spirit of Hope Award	Won	
Billboard Latin Music Awards	2023	Karol G	Artist of the Year	Nominated	
Billboard Latin Music Awards	2023	Karol G	Global 200 Latin Artist of the Year	Nominated	
Billboard Latin Music Awards	2023	Karol G	Hot Latin Songs Artist of the Year, Female	Won	
Billboard Latin Music Awards	2023	Karol G	Top Latin Albums Artist of the Year, Female	Won	
Billboard Latin Music Awards	2023	Karol G	Latin Rhythm Artist of the Year, Solo	Nominated	
Billboard Latin Music Awards	2023	"TQG" (with Shakira)	Hot Latin Song of the Year	Nominated	
Billboard Latin Music Awards	2023	"TQG" (with Shakira)	Hot Latin Song of the Year, Vocal Event	Nominated	
Billboard Latin Music Awards	2023	"TQG" (with Shakira)	Airplay Song of the Year	Nominated	
Billboard Latin Music Awards	2023	"TQG" (with Shakira)	Sales Song of the Year	Nominated	
Billboard Latin Music Awards	2023	"TQG" (with Shakira)	Latin Pop Song of the Year	Nominated	
Billboard Latin Music Awards	2023	Mañana Será Bonito	Top Latin Album of the Year	Won	
Billboard Latin Music Awards	2023	Mañana Será Bonito	Latin Rhythm Album of the Year	Won	
Billboard Latin Music Awards	2023	Strip Love Tour	Tour of the Year	Nominated	
Billboard Latin Music Awards	2024	Karol G	Artist of the Year	Nominated	
Billboard Latin Music Awards	2024	Karol G	Global 200 Latin Artist of the Year	Won	
Billboard Latin Music Awards	2024	Karol G	Hot Latin Songs Artist of the Year, Female	Won	
Billboard Latin Music Awards	2024	Karol G	Top Latin Albums Artist of the Year, Female	Won	
Billboard Latin Music Awards	2024	Karol G	Latin Rhythm Artist of the Year, Solo	Nominated	
Billboard Latin Music Awards	2024	"Qlona" (with Peso Pluma)	Global 200 Latin Song of the Year	Nominated	
Billboard Latin Music Awards	2024	"Qlona" (with Peso Pluma)	Hot Latin Song of the Year	Won	
Billboard Latin Music Awards	2024	"Qlona" (with Peso Pluma)	Hot Latin Song of the Year, Vocal Event	Won	
Billboard Latin Music Awards	2024	"Qlona" (with Peso Pluma)	Streaming Song of the Year	Won	
Billboard Latin Music Awards	2024	"Qlona" (with Peso Pluma)	Airplay Song of the Year	Nominated	
Billboard Latin Music Awards	2024	"Qlona" (with Peso Pluma)	Sales Song of the Year	Nominated	
Billboard Latin Music Awards	2024	"Si Antes Te Hubiera Conocido"	Sales Song of the Year	Nominated	
Billboard Latin Music Awards	2024	"Mi Ex Tenía Razón"	Sales Song of the Year	Nominated	
Billboard Latin Music Awards	2024	"Mi Ex Tenía Razón"	Airplay Song of the Year	Won	
Billboard Latin Music Awards	2024	Mañana Será Bonito (Bichota Season)	Top Latin Album of the Year	Nominated	
Billboard Latin Music Awards	2024	Mañana Será Bonito (Bichota Season)	Latin Rhythm Album of the Year	Nominated	
Billboard Latin Music Awards	2024	Mañana Será Bonito Tour	Tour of the Year	Won	
Billboard Latin Music Awards	2025	Karol G	Global 200 Latin Artist of the Year	Nominated	
Billboard Latin Music Awards	2025	Karol G	Hot Latin Songs Artist of the Year, Female	Won	
Billboard Latin Music Awards	2025	Karol G	Top Latin Albums Artist of the Year, Female	Won	
Billboard Latin Music Awards	2025	Karol G	Latin Rhythm Artist of the Year, Solo	Nominated	
Billboard Latin Music Awards	2025	"Si Antes Te Hubiera Conocido"	Global 200 Latin Song of the Year	Won	
Billboard Latin Music Awards	2025	"Si Antes Te Hubiera Conocido"	Airplay Song of the Year	Won	
Billboard Latin Music Awards	2025	"Si Antes Te Hubiera Conocido"	Sales Song of the Year	Won	
Billboard Latin Music Awards	2025	"Si Antes Te Hubiera Conocido"	Streaming Song of the Year	Nominated	
Billboard Latin Music Awards	2025	"Si Antes Te Hubiera Conocido"	Tropical Song of the Year	Won	
Billboard Latin Music Awards	2025	Tropicoqueta	Latin Rhythm Album of the Year	Nominated	
Billboard Latin Music Awards	2026	Karol G	Artist of the Year	Nominated	
Billboard Latin Music Awards	2026	Karol G	Fan Artist	Won	
Billboard Latin Music Awards	2026	Karol G	Tour of the Year	Nominated	
Billboard Latin Music Awards	2026	Karol G	Global 200 Latin Artist of the Year	Nominated	
Billboard Latin Music Awards	2026	Karol G	Hot Latin Songs Artist of the Year, Female	Won	
Billboard Latin Music Awards	2026	Karol G	Top Latin Albums Artist of the Year, Female	Won	
Billboard Latin Music Awards	2026	Karol G	Latin Rhythm Artist of the Year, Solo	Nominated	
Billboard Latin Music Awards	2026	"Coleccionando Heridas" (with Marco Antonio Solís)	Latin Airplay Song of the Year	Nominated	
Billboard Latin Music Awards	2026	"Coleccionando Heridas" (with Marco Antonio Solís)	Latin Pop Song of the Year	Won	
Billboard Latin Music Awards	2026	No Me Arrepiento de Sentir Tanto	Top Latin Pop Album of the Year	Nominated	
Billboard Latin Women in Music	2024	Karol G	Woman of the Year	Won	
Billboard Music Awards	2020	"China" (with Anuel AA, Daddy Yankee, Ozuna and J Balvin)	Top Latin Song	Nominated	
Billboard Music Awards	2021	"Caramelo" (Remix) (with Ozuna and Myke Towers)	Top Latin Song	Nominated	
Billboard Music Awards	2021	Karol G	Top Latin Female Artist	Won	
Billboard Music Awards	2022	Karol G	Top Latin Artist	Nominated	
Billboard Music Awards	2022	Karol G	Top Latin Female Artist	Nominated	
Billboard Music Awards	2022	KG0516	Top Latin Album	Won	
Billboard Music Awards	2023	Mañana Será Bonito	Top Latin Album	Nominated	
Billboard Music Awards	2023	"TQG" (with Shakira)	Top Latin Song	Nominated	
Billboard Music Awards	2023	Karol G	Top Latin Touring Artist	Won	
Billboard Music Awards	2023	Karol G	Top Latin Female Artist	Won	
Billboard Music Awards	2023	Karol G	Top Latin Artist	Nominated	
Billboard Music Awards	2024	Karol G	Top Latin Artist	Nominated	
Billboard Music Awards	2024	Karol G	Top Latin Female Artist	Won	
Billboard Music Awards	2024	Karol G	Top Latin Touring Artist	Nominated	
Billboard Music Awards	2024	Mañana Será Bonito (Bichota Season)	Top Latin Album	Nominated	
Billboard Music Awards	2024	"Qlona" (with Peso Pluma)	Top Latin Song	Nominated	
Billboard Women in Music	2021	Karol G	Rulebreaker Award	Won	
Billboard Women in Music	2024	Karol G	Woman of the Year	Won	
BreakTudo Awards	2020	"Tusa" (with Nicki Minaj)	Collaboration of the Year	Nominated	
BreakTudo Awards	2020	Karol G	Global Artist of the Year	Nominated	
BreakTudo Awards	2020	Karol G	Latin Artist of the Year	Nominated	
BreakTudo Awards	2021	Karol G	Latin Artist of the Year	Nominated	
BreakTudo Awards	2021	"Bichota"	Latin Hit of the Year	Nominated	
BreakTudo Awards	2022	"Mamiii" (with Becky G)	Latin Hit of the Year	Nominated	
BreakTudo Awards	2022	Karol G	Latin Artist of the Year	Nominated	
BreakTudo Awards	2023	Karol G	Latin Artist of the Year	Nominated	
BreakTudo Awards	2023	"TQG" (with Shakira)	Latin Hit of the Year	Won	
BreakTudo Awards	2024	"Si Antes Te Hubiera Conocido"	Latin Hit of the Year	Nominated	
BreakTudo Awards	2024	Karol G	Latin Artist of the Year	Nominated	
BreakTudo Awards	2024	"Contigo" (with Tiësto)	International Collaboration of the Year	Nominated	
BMI Latin Awards	2021	"China"	Winning Songs	Won	
BMI Latin Awards	2021	"Secreto"	Winning Songs	Won	
BMI Latin Awards	2022	"Bichota"	Winning Songs	Won	
BMI Latin Awards	2022	"Tusa" (with Nicki Minaj)	Winning Songs	Won	
BMI Latin Awards	2023	"Ay, Dios Mio!"	Winning Songs	Won	
BMI Latin Awards	2023	"Caramelo"	Winning Songs	Won	
BMI Latin Awards	2023	"El Makinon"	Winning Songs	Won	
BMI Latin Awards	2023	"Mamiii"	Winning Songs	Won	
BMI Latin Awards	2024	"Gatúbela"	Winning Songs	Won	
BMI Latin Awards	2024	"Provenza"	Winning Songs	Won	
BMI Latin Awards	2024	"TQG" (with Shakira)	Winning Songs	Won	
BMI Latin Awards	2025	"X Si Volvemos"	Winning Songs	Won	
BMI Latin Awards	2025	"Qlona"	Winning Songs	Won	
BMI Latin Awards	2025	"S91"	Winning Songs	Won	
BMI Latin Awards	2025	"Cairo"	Winning Songs	Won	
BMI Latin Awards	2025	"Amargura"	Winning Songs	Won	
BMI Latin Awards	2025	"Mi Ex Tenía Razón"	Winning Songs	Won	
BMI Latin Awards	2025	Karol G	Contemporary Latin Songwriter of the Year	Won	
BMI Latin Awards	2026	"Si Antes Te Hubiera Conocido"	Winning Song	Won	
BMI Latin Awards	2026	"Si Antes Te Hubiera Conocido"	Contemporary Latin Song of the Year	Won	
Heat Latin Music Awards	2016	Karol G	Best Female Artist	Won	
Heat Latin Music Awards	2017	Karol G	Best Female Artist	Nominated	
Heat Latin Music Awards	2019	Karol G	Best Female Artist	Won	
Heat Latin Music Awards	2019	Karol G	Best Urban Artist	Nominated	
Heat Latin Music Awards	2019	"Pineapple"	Best Video	Won	
Heat Latin Music Awards	2020	Karol G	Best Female Artist	Nominated	
Heat Latin Music Awards	2020	Karol G	Best Urban Artist	Won	
Heat Latin Music Awards	2020	"China" (with Anuel AA, Daddy Yankee, Ozuna and J Balvin)	Best Collaboration	Nominated	
Heat Latin Music Awards	2020	"Tusa" (with Nicki Minaj)	Best Video	Won	
Heat Latin Music Awards	2021	Karol G	Best Female Artist	Nominated	
Heat Latin Music Awards	2021	Karol G	Best Urban Artist	Won	
Heat Latin Music Awards	2021	"¿Miedito o Qué?" (Ovy on the Drums and Danny Ocean feat. Karol G)	Best Collaboration	Nominated	
Heat Latin Music Awards	2021	"Bichota"	Best Video	Nominated	
Heat Latin Music Awards	2021	"Location" (with Anuel AA and J Balvin)	Best Video	Nominated	
Heat Latin Music Awards	2022	Karol G	Best Female Artist	Won	
Heat Latin Music Awards	2022	Karol G	Best Urban Artist	Nominated	
Heat Latin Music Awards	2022	"Don't Be Shy" (with Tiësto)	Best Music Video	Nominated	
Heat Latin Music Awards	2022	"No Te Deseo Mal" (with Eladio Carrión)	Best Collaboration	Nominated	
Heat Latin Music Awards	2023	Karol G	Best Female Artist	Nominated	
Heat Latin Music Awards	2023	Karol G	Best Urban Artist	Won	
Heat Latin Music Awards	2023	"Provenza"	Song of the Year	Won	
Heat Latin Music Awards	2023	"Mientras Me Curo del Cora"	Best Music Video	Won	
Heat Latin Music Awards	2023	"Cairo" (with Ovy on the Drums)	Best Music Video	Nominated	
Heat Latin Music Awards	2023	"TQG" (with Shakira)	Best Collaboration	Nominated	
Heat Latin Music Awards	2024	Karol G	Best Female Artist	Won	
Heat Latin Music Awards	2024	Karol G	Best Urban Artist	Won	
Heat Latin Music Awards	2024	Karol G	Fandom of the Year	Nominated	
Heat Latin Music Awards	2024	"Mi Ex Tenía Razón"	Song of the Year	Won	
Heat Latin Music Awards	2024	"Que Chimba de Vida"	Song of the Year	Nominated	
Heat Latin Music Awards	2024	"Contigo" (with Tiësto)	Best Collaboration	Won	
Heat Latin Music Awards	2024	Mañana Será Bonito (Bichota Season)	Album of the Year	Won	
Heat Latin Music Awards	2024	"Watati" (featuring Aldo Ranks)	Best Videogame, Series or Movie Song	Won	
Heat Latin Music Awards	2024	"S91"	Best Music Video	Won	
Heat Latin Music Awards	2025	Karol G	Best Female Artist	Won	
Heat Latin Music Awards	2025	Karol G	Fandom of the Year	Nominated	
Heat Latin Music Awards	2025	"Si Antes Te Hubiera Conocido"	Song of the Year	Won	
Heat Latin Music Awards	2025	"Si Antes Te Hubiera Conocido"	Best Music Video	Won	
Heat Latin Music Awards	2026	Karol G	Best Female Artist	Pending	
Heat Latin Music Awards	2026	Karol G	Best Urban Artist	Pending	
Heat Latin Music Awards	2026	Karol G	Fandom of the Year	Pending	
Heat Latin Music Awards	2026	Tropicoqueta	Album of the Year	Pending	
Heat Latin Music Awards	2026	"Papasito"	Best Music Video	Pending	
Heat Latin Music Awards	2026	"Coleccionando Heridas" (with Marco Antonio Solís)	Best Collaboration	Pending	
Heat Latin Music Awards	2026	"Coleccionando Heridas" (with Marco Antonio Solís)	Song of the Year	Pending	
Heat Latin Music Awards	2026	"Bby Wow" (with Judeline & Rusowsky)	Best Collaboration	Pending	
Heat Latin Music Awards	2026	"Bby Wow" (with Judeline & Rusowsky)	Song of the Year	Pending	
Heat Latin Music Awards	2026	"Bby Wow" (with Judeline & Rusowsky)	Best Viral Song	Pending	
Hispanic Heritage Awards	2018	Karol G	Inspira Award	Won	
iHeartRadio Music Awards	2018	Karol G	Best New Latin Artist	Nominated	
iHeartRadio Music Awards	2021	Karol G	Latin Pop/Reggaeton Artist of the Year	Nominated	
iHeartRadio Music Awards	2021	"Tusa" (with Nicki Minaj)	Latin Pop/Reggaeton Song of the Year	Won	
iHeartRadio Music Awards	2022	Karol G	Latin Pop/Reggaeton Artist of the Year	Nominated	
iHeartRadio Music Awards	2022	"Bichota"	Latin Pop/Reggaeton Song of the Year	Nominated	
iHeartRadio Music Awards	2022	KG0516	Latin Pop/Reggaeton Album of the Year	Won	
iHeartRadio Music Awards	2023	Karol G	Latin Pop/Reggaeton Artist of the Year	Nominated	
iHeartRadio Music Awards	2023	"Mamiii" (with Becky G)	Latin Pop/Reggaeton Song of the Year	Won	
iHeartRadio Music Awards	2023	"Provenza"	Latin Pop/Reggaeton Song of the Year	Nominated	
iHeartRadio Music Awards	2023	"Don't Be Shy" (with Tiësto)	Best Music Video	Nominated	
iHeartRadio Music Awards	2024	Karol G	Latin Pop/Reggaeton Artist of the Year	Won	
iHeartRadio Music Awards	2024	"TQG" (with Shakira)	Best Collaboration	Nominated	
iHeartRadio Music Awards	2024	"TQG" (with Shakira)	Latin Pop/Reggaeton Song of the Year	Nominated	
iHeartRadio Music Awards	2024	"TQG" (with Shakira)	Best Music Video	Nominated	
iHeartRadio Music Awards	2024	Mañana Será Bonito	Latin Pop/Urban Album of the Year	Won	
iHeartRadio Music Awards	2025	Karol G	Latin Pop/Urban Artist of the Year	Nominated	
iHeartRadio Music Awards	2025	"Qlona" (with Peso Pluma)	Latin Pop/Urban Song of the Year	Nominated	
iHeartRadio Music Awards	2025	"Si Antes Te Hubiera Conocido"	Latin Pop/Urban Song of the Year	Nominated	
iHeartRadio Music Awards	2026	Karol G	Latin Pop/Urban Artist of the Year	Nominated	
iHeartRadio Music Awards	2026	Karol G: Tomorrow Was Beautiful	Favorite On Screen	Nominated	
InMusic Awards	2022	Karol G	Best Latin Artist	Nominated	
InMusic Awards	2023	Karol G	Best Latin Artist	Nominated	
InMusic Awards	2023	Mañana Será Bonito	Album of the Year	Nominated	
InMusic Awards	2023	"TQG" (with Shakira)	Best Collaboration	Nominated	
InMusic Awards	2023	"TQG" (with Shakira)	Video of the Year	Nominated	
InMusic Awards	2024	"Si Antes Te Hubiera Conocido"	Best Latin Song	Nominated	
InMusic Awards	2024	Karol G	Best Latin Artist	Nominated	
La Musa Awards	2018	Karol G	La Musa Elena Casals Award	Won	
Latin American Music Awards	2018	Karol G	Favorite Artist – Female	Nominated	
Latin American Music Awards	2019	Karol G	Artist of the Year	Nominated	
Latin American Music Awards	2019	Karol G	Favorite Artist – Female	Nominated	
Latin American Music Awards	2021	Karol G	Artist of the Year	Nominated	
Latin American Music Awards	2021	Karol G	Social Artist of the Year	Nominated	
Latin American Music Awards	2021	Karol G	Favorite Artist – Female	Nominated	
Latin American Music Awards	2021	Karol G	Favorite Artist – Urban	Nominated	
Latin American Music Awards	2021	"Tusa" (with Nicki Minaj)	Song of the Year	Won	
Latin American Music Awards	2021	"Tusa" (with Nicki Minaj)	Collaboration of the Year	Won	
Latin American Music Awards	2021	"Tusa" (with Nicki Minaj)	Favorite Song – Urban	Won	
Latin American Music Awards	2021	"Caramelo" (Remix) (with Ozuna and Myke Towers)	Collaboration of the Year	Nominated	
Latin American Music Awards	2021	"Caramelo" (Remix) (with Ozuna and Myke Towers)	Favorite Song – Urban	Nominated	
Latin American Music Awards	2022	Karol G	Artist of the Year	Won	
Latin American Music Awards	2022	Karol G	Social Artist of the Year	Nominated	
Latin American Music Awards	2022	Karol G	Favorite Artist – Female	Won	
Latin American Music Awards	2022	Karol G	Favorite Artist – Urban	Won	
Latin American Music Awards	2022	"El Makinon" (with Mariah Angeliq)	Collaboration of the Year	Won	
Latin American Music Awards	2022	KG0516	Album of the Year	Won	
Latin American Music Awards	2022	KG0516	Favorite Album – Urban	Won	
Latin American Music Awards	2023	Karol G	Artist of the Year	Won	
Latin American Music Awards	2023	Karol G	Favorite Urban Artist	Won	
Latin American Music Awards	2023	Karol G	Streaming Artist of the Year	Won	
Latin American Music Awards	2023	"Mamiii" (with Becky G)	Song of the Year	Won	
Latin American Music Awards	2023	"Mamiii" (with Becky G)	Collaboration of the Year	Won	
Latin American Music Awards	2023	"Mamiii" (with Becky G)	Best Collaboration - Pop/Urban	Won	
Latin American Music Awards	2023	"Provenza"	Favorite Pop Song	Won	
Latin American Music Awards	2023	Strip Love Tour	Tour of the Year	Won	
Latin American Music Awards	2024	Karol G	Artist of the Year	Won	
Latin American Music Awards	2024	Karol G	Streaming Artist of the Year	Nominated	
Latin American Music Awards	2024	Karol G	Global Latin Artist of the Year	Won	
Latin American Music Awards	2024	Karol G	Favorite Urban Artist	Won	
Latin American Music Awards	2024	"TQG" (with Shakira)	Song of the Year	Won	
Latin American Music Awards	2024	"TQG" (with Shakira)	Favorite Urban Song	Nominated	
Latin American Music Awards	2024	Mañana Será Bonito	Album of the Year	Won	
Latin American Music Awards	2024	Mañana Será Bonito	Favorite Urban Album	Won	
Latin American Music Awards	2024	Mañana Será Bonito Tour	Tour of the Year	Nominated	
Latin American Music Awards	2024	Mañana Será Bonito Tour	Tour of the Year	Nominated	
Latino Music Awards (Colombia)	2018	Karol G	Best Urban Female Artist	Nominated	
Latino Music Awards (Colombia)	2018	"Mi Cama"	Best Video	Nominated	
Latino Music Awards (Colombia)	2020	"Tusa" (with Nicki Minaj)	Song of the Year	Nominated	
Latino Music Awards (Colombia)	2020	"Tusa" (with Nicki Minaj)	Best Urban Song	Won	
Latino Music Awards (Colombia)	2021	"Bichota"	Best Urban Song	Won	
Latino Music Awards (Colombia)	2021	"Bichota"	Song of the Year	Nominated	
Latino Music Awards (Colombia)	2021	Karol G	Artist of the Year	Nominated	
Latino Music Awards (Colombia)	2021	Karol G	Best Urban Female Artist	Nominated	
Latino Music Awards (Colombia)	2022	Karol G	Best Urban Female Artist	Nominated	
Latino Music Awards (Colombia)	2022	Karol G	Artist of the Year	Won	
Latino Music Awards (Colombia)	2022	Karol G (with Ovy on the Drums)	Best Popular Music Producer	Nominated	
Latino Music Awards (Colombia)	2022	"200 Copas"	Best Popular Song	Nominated	
Latino Music Awards (Colombia)	2022	"200 Copas"	Best Popular Video	Won	
Latino Music Awards (Colombia)	2022	"Mamiii" (with Becky G)	Song of the Year	Won	
Latino Music Awards (Colombia)	2022	"Mamiii" (with Becky G)	Best Urban Song	Won	
Latino Music Awards (Colombia)	2022	"Mamiii" (with Becky G)	Best Urban Video	Won	
Latino Music Awards (Colombia)	2023	"Gatúbela" (with Maldy)	Best Urban Video	Nominated	
Latino Music Awards (Colombia)	2023	"TQG" (with Shakira)	Best Urban Video	Won	
Latino Music Awards (Colombia)	2023	"TQG" (with Shakira)	Best Viral Song of TikTok	Won	
Latino Music Awards (Colombia)	2023	"TQG" (with Shakira)	Song of the Year	Won	
Latino Music Awards (Colombia)	2023	"TQG" (with Shakira)	Best Urban Song	Nominated	
Latino Music Awards (Colombia)	2023	"Gatúbela" (with Maldy)	Best Urban Song	Won	
Latino Music Awards (Colombia)	2023	Karol G (with DJ Maff)	Best Urban Music Producer	Won	
Latino Music Awards (Colombia)	2023	Karol G	Best Viral Artist of TikTok	Won	
Latino Music Awards (Colombia)	2023	Karol G	Best Urban Female Artist	Won	
Latino Music Awards (Colombia)	2023	Karol G	Artist of the Year	Nominated	
Latino Music Awards (Colombia)	2023	Bichota Tour (Reloaded)	Tour of the Year	Won	
Latino Music Awards (Colombia)	2023	"X Si Volvemos" (with Romeo Santos)	Best Tropical Song	Won	
Latino Music Awards (Colombia)	2023	"Mientras Me Curo del Cora"	Best Urban Pop Video	Won	
Latino Music Awards (Colombia)	2023	"Mientras Me Curo del Cora"	Best Urban Pop Song	Nominated	
Latino Music Awards (Colombia)	2024	"Mientras Me Curo del Cora"	Best Urban Pop Song	Won	
Latino Music Awards (Colombia)	2024	"Mientras Me Curo del Cora"	Best Urban Pop Video	Won	
Latino Music Awards (Colombia)	2024	"Mientras Me Curo del Cora"	Best Urban Song	Nominated	
Latino Music Awards (Colombia)	2024	"Mientras Me Curo del Cora"	Best Urban Video	Nominated	
Latino Music Awards (Colombia)	2024	"Mientras Me Curo del Cora"	Video of the Year	Nominated	
Latino Music Awards (Colombia)	2024	"Mientras Me Curo del Cora"	Best Viral Song of TikTok	Nominated	
Latino Music Awards (Colombia)	2024	"TQG" (with Shakira)	Best Viral Song of TikTok	Nominated	
Latino Music Awards (Colombia)	2024	"TQG" (with Shakira)	Best Urban Song	Won	
Latino Music Awards (Colombia)	2024	"TQG" (with Shakira)	Best Urban Video	Won	
Latino Music Awards (Colombia)	2024	"TQG" (with Shakira)	Song of the Year	Nominated	
Latino Music Awards (Colombia)	2024	"TQG" (with Shakira)	Video of the Year	Nominated	
Latino Music Awards (Colombia)	2024	Karol G	Best Fan Club of the Year	Nominated	
Latino Music Awards (Colombia)	2024	Karol G	Artist of the Year	Nominated	
Latino Music Awards (Colombia)	2024	Karol G	Best Viral Artist of TikTok	Nominated	
Latino Music Awards (Colombia)	2024	Karol G	Best Urban Female Artist	Nominated	
Latino Music Awards (Colombia)	2024	Karol G	Best Urban Pop Female Artist	Nominated	
Latino Music Awards (Colombia)	2024	Mañana Será Bonito	Album of the Year	Nominated	
Latino Music Awards (Colombia)	2025	Karol G	Best Urban Female Artist	Nominated	
Latino Music Awards (Colombia)	2025	Karol G	Artist of the Year	Nominated	
Latino Music Awards (Colombia)	2025	"Si Antes Te Hubiera Conocido"	Song of the Year	Nominated	
Latino Music Awards (Colombia)	2025	"Si Antes Te Hubiera Conocido"	Video of the Year	Nominated	
Latino Music Awards (Colombia)	2025	"Si Antes Te Hubiera Conocido"	Best Tropical Song	Won	
LOS40 Music Awards	2020	Karol G	Best Urban Act	Nominated	
LOS40 Music Awards	2020	"Tusa" (with Nicki Minaj)	Best Latin Song	Nominated	
LOS40 Music Awards	2020	"Tusa" (with Nicki Minaj)	Best Latin Video	Won	
LOS40 Music Awards	2021	Karol G	Best Urban Act	Nominated	
LOS40 Music Awards	2021	"Location" (with Anuel AA and J Balvin)	Best Latin Video	Nominated	
LOS40 Music Awards	2022	"Don't Be Shy" (with Tiësto)	Best International Collaboration	Nominated	
LOS40 Music Awards	2022	Karol G	Best Latin Act	Nominated	
LOS40 Music Awards	2022	"Provenza"	Best Latin Song	Nominated	
LOS40 Music Awards	2022	"Provenza"	Best Latin Video	Nominated	
LOS40 Music Awards	2022	"Mamiii" (with Becky G)	Best Latin Video	Nominated	
LOS40 Music Awards	2022	Karol G	Best Latin Urban Act or Producer	Nominated	
LOS40 Music Awards	2023	Karol G	Best Latin Act	Nominated	
LOS40 Music Awards	2023	Mañana Será Bonito	Best Latin Album	Nominated	
LOS40 Music Awards	2023	"TQG" (with Shakira)	Best Latin Video	Nominated	
LOS40 Music Awards	2023	"TQG" (with Shakira)	Best Latin Urban Collaboration	Nominated	
LOS40 Music Awards	2023	"Qlona" (with Peso Pluma)	Best Urban Song	Nominated	
LOS40 Music Awards	2024	"Si Antes Te Hubiera Conocido"	Best Latin Video	Nominated	
LOS40 Music Awards	2024	"Si Antes Te Hubiera Conocido"	Best Latin Song	Nominated	
LOS40 Music Awards	2024	"Contigo" (with Tiësto)	Best Latin Collaboration	Nominated	
LOS40 Music Awards	2024	Karol G	Best Latin Urban Act	Nominated	
LOS40 Music Awards	2024	Mañana Será Bonito Tour	Best Tour, Festival or Concert	Nominated	
LOS40 Music Awards	2025	Karol G	Best Latin Urban Act	Nominated	
LOS40 Music Awards	2025	Tropicoqueta	Best Latin Urban Album	Nominated	
LOS40 Music Awards	2025	"Verano Rosa" (with Feid)	Best Latin Urban Collaboration	Nominated	
LOS40 Music Awards	2025	"Verano Rosa" (with Feid)	Best Latin Video	Nominated	
LOS40 Music Awards	2026	Karol G	Best Latin Live Act	Pending	
LOS40 Music Awards	2026	No Me Arrepiento de Sentir Tanto	Best Latin Album	Pending	
LOS40 Music Awards	2026	"Bby Wow" (with Judeline & Rusowsky)	Best Latin Urban Song	Pending	
Monitor Latino Music Awards	2020	"Tusa" (with Nicki Minaj)	Best Urban Song	Won	
Monitor Latino Music Awards	2020	"Tusa" (with Nicki Minaj)	Collaboration of the Year	Won	
Monitor Latino Music Awards	2020	"China" (with Anuel AA, Daddy Yankee, Ozuna and J Balvin)	Collaboration of the Year	Nominated	
Monitor Latino Music Awards	2020	"China" (with Anuel AA, Daddy Yankee, Ozuna and J Balvin)	Best Urban Song	Nominated	
Monitor Latino Music Awards	2021	"Ay, Dios Mio!"	Best Urban Song	Nominated	
Monitor Latino Music Awards	2021	"Caramelo" (Remix) (with Ozuna and Myke Towers)	Best Urban Song	Nominated	
Monitor Latino Music Awards	2021	"¿Miedito, o Qué?" (Ovy on the Drums and Danny Ocean feat. Karol G)	Best Male Pop Song	Nominated	
Monitor Latino Music Awards	2021	Karol G	Female Artist of the Year	Won	
Monitor Latino Music Awards	2022	Karol G	Best Urban Artist	Nominated	
Monitor Latino Music Awards	2022	"Mamiii" (with Becky G)	Best Urban Song	Nominated	
Monitor Latino Music Awards	2025	"Si Antes Te Hubiera Conocido"	Best Urban Song of the Year	Nominated	
Monitor Latino Music Awards	2025	"Si Antes Te Hubiera Conocido"	Best Tropical Song	Won	
MTV Europe Music Awards	2020	"Tusa" (with Nicki Minaj)	Best Video	Nominated	
MTV Europe Music Awards	2020	"Tusa" (with Nicki Minaj)	Best Collaboration	Won	
MTV Europe Music Awards	2020	Karol G	Best Latin	Won	
MTV Europe Music Awards	2020	Karol G	Best Latin America Central Act	Nominated	
MTV Europe Music Awards	2021	Karol G	Best Latin America Central Act	Nominated	
MTV Europe Music Awards	2022	Karol G	Best Latin America Central Act	Nominated	
MTV Europe Music Awards	2023	Karol G	Best Latin	Nominated	
MTV Europe Music Awards	2023	"TQG" (with Shakira)	Best Collaboration	Won	
MTV Europe Music Awards	2024	Karol G	Best Latin	Nominated	
MTV MIAW Awards	2018	Karol G	Urban Explosion	Nominated	
MTV MIAW Awards	2019	Karol G	Artist + duro Colombia (Best Colombian Artist)	Nominated	
MTV MIAW Awards	2019	Karol G	Instagramer level god Colombia (Best Colombian Instagrammer)	Nominated	
MTV MIAW Awards	2019	"Secreto" (with Anuel AA)	Hit of the Year	Nominated	
MTV MIAW Awards	2021	Karol G	MIAW Artist	Nominated	
MTV MIAW Awards	2021	Karol G	Colombian Artist	Nominated	
MTV MIAW Awards	2021	Karol G	Bichota of the Year	Nominated	
MTV MIAW Awards	2021	"Bichota"	Hit of the Year	Nominated	
MTV MIAW Awards	2021	"Location" (with Anuel AA and J Balvin)	Music-Ship of the Year (Best Collaboration)	Nominated	
MTV MIAW Awards	2021	"El Makinon" (with Mariah Angeliq)	Viral Anthem	Nominated	
MTV MIAW Awards	2022	Karol G	MIAW Artist	Won	
MTV MIAW Awards	2022	"Caída de Karol G" (Karol G falling)	Ridículo del Año (Ridiculousness of the Year)	Nominated	
MTV MIAW Awards	2022	"Mamiii" (with Becky G)	Viral Anthem	Won	
MTV MIAW Awards	2023	Karol G	MIAW Artist	Nominated	
MTV MIAW Awards	2023	Karol G	La Loba of the Year	Nominated	
MTV MIAW Awards	2023	"TQG" (with Shakira)	Global Hit of the Year	Won	
MTV MIAW Awards	2023	Karol G & Feid	Couple Goals	Nominated	
MTV MIAW Awards	2023	"Karol G no merece photoshop" (Karol G photoshop controversy)	Ridiculo del año (Ridiculousness of the Year)	Nominated	
MTV MIAW Awards	2024	Karol G	MIAW Artist	Nominated	
MTV MIAW Awards	2024	Karol G	"La Patrona" of the Year	Won	
MTV MIAW Awards	2024	"Qlona" (with Peso Pluma)	Bellakeo Supremo	Nominated	
MTV MIAW Awards	2024	"Contigo" (with Tiësto)	Video of the Year	Won	
MTV MIAW Awards	2024	Mañana Será Bonito Latam Tour	Event of the Year	Won	
MTV Millennial Awards Brazil	2022	Karol G	¡Me Gusta!	Nominated	
MTV Video Music Awards	2020	"Tusa" (with Nicki Minaj)	Best Collaboration	Nominated	
MTV Video Music Awards	2020	"Tusa" (with Nicki Minaj)	Best Latin	Nominated	
MTV Video Music Awards	2020	"China" (with Anuel AA, Daddy Yankee, Ozuna and J Balvin)	Best Latin	Nominated	
MTV Video Music Awards	2021	"Bichota"	Best Latin	Nominated	
MTV Video Music Awards	2022	"Mamiii" (with Becky G)	Best Latin	Nominated	
MTV Video Music Awards	2023	Karol G	Artist of the Year	Nominated	
MTV Video Music Awards	2023	Karol G	Show of the Summer	Nominated	
MTV Video Music Awards	2023	"TQG" (with Shakira)	Best Collaboration	Won	
MTV Video Music Awards	2023	"TQG" (with Shakira)	Best Latin	Nominated	
MTV Video Music Awards	2024	"Mi Ex Tenía Razón"	Best Latin	Nominated	
MTV Video Music Awards	2025	"Si Antes Te Hubiera Conocido"	Best Latin	Nominated	
MTV Video Music Awards	2026	"Papasito"	Best Latin	Nominated	
Musa Sprite Awards (Chile)	2020	"Tusa" (with Nicki Minaj)	International Latin Song	Nominated	
Musa Sprite Awards (Chile)	2021	"El Makinon" (with Mariah Angeliq)	International Latin Song	Nominated	
Musa Sprite Awards (Chile)	2021	Karol G	International Latin Artist	Nominated	
Musa Sprite Awards (Chile)	2022	Karol G	International Latin Artist	Nominated	
Musa Sprite Awards (Chile)	2022	"Provenza"	International Latin Song	Nominated	
Musa Sprite Awards (Chile)	2023	"TQG" (with Shakira)	International Latin Song	Won	
Musa Sprite Awards (Chile)	2023	"TQG" (with Shakira)	International Collaboration of the Year	Won	
Musa Sprite Awards (Chile)	2023	Karol G	International Latin Artist	Won	
Musa Sprite Awards (Chile)	2024	Karol G	International Latin Artist	Won	
Musa Sprite Awards (Chile)	2024	"Si Antes Te Hubiera Conocido"	International Latin Song	Won	
Musa Sprite Awards (Chile)	2024	Mañana Será Bonito Tour	Concert of the Year	Won	
Nickelodeon Colombia Kids' Choice Awards	2017	Karol G	Instagrammer Favorite	Nominated	
Nickelodeon Kids' Choice Awards	2024	Karol G	Favorite Global Music Star	Nominated	
Nickelodeon Kids' Choice Awards	2026	Karol G	Favorite Female Artist	Pending	
Nickelodeon Kids' Choice Awards	2026	Karol G	Favorite Global Music Star	Pending	
NRJ Music Awards	2020	Karol G	International Revelation of the Year	Nominated	
NRJ Music Awards	2020	"Tusa" (with Nicki Minaj)	International Song of the Year	Nominated	
NRJ Music Awards	2020	"Tusa" (with Nicki Minaj)	International Collaboration of the Year	Nominated	
NRJ Music Awards	2024	"TQG" (with Shakira)	International Collaboration of the Year	Nominated	
People's Choice Awards	2019	Karol G	Latin Artist of the Year	Nominated	
People's Choice Awards	2020	Karol G	Latin Artist of the Year	Nominated	
People's Choice Awards	2021	Karol G	Latin Artist of the Year	Nominated	
People's Choice Awards	2021	"Location" (with Anuel AA and J Balvin)	The Music Video of the Year	Nominated	
People's Choice Awards	2022	Karol G	Latin Artist of the Year	Nominated	
People's Choice Awards	2024	Karol G	Favorite Female Artist	Nominated	
People's Choice Awards	2024	Karol G	Female Latin Artist of the Year	Nominated	
People's Choice Awards	2024	"TQG" (with Shakira)	The Collaboration Song of the Year	Nominated	
People's Choice Awards	2024	Mañana Será Bonito	The Album of the Year	Nominated	
Pollstar Awards	2022	Bichota Tour	Best Latin Tour	Nominated	
Pollstar Awards	2023	Karol G	New Headliner of the Year	Nominated	
Pollstar Awards	2023	Strip Love Tour	Latin Tour of the Year	Nominated	
Pollstar Awards	2024	Mañana Será Bonito Tour	Latin Tour of the Year	Won	
Premios Charts Ecuador	2020	Karol G	International Artist	Nominated	
Premios Charts Ecuador	2021	Karol G	International Latin Artist	Won	
Premios Charts Ecuador	2021	"El Makinon" (with Mariah Angeliq)	International Song	Nominated	
Premios DeGira	2020	"Tusa" (with Nicki Minaj)	Best Song in Spanish	Won	
Premios DeGira	2021	"Bichota"	Best Song in Spanish	Won	
Premios DeGira	2021	"Bichota"	Best Song in Spanish Music Video	Nominated	
Premios DeGira	2021	Karol G	Best Artist for Spanish Music	Nominated	
Premios DeGira por Streaming	2020	"China" (with Anuel AA, Daddy Yankee, Ozuna and J Balvin)	Best Spanish Song	Nominated	
Premios Juventud	2019	Karol G	Street Style	Nominated	
Premios Juventud	2019	Karol G and Anuel AA	Couples that Fire Up My Feed (Best Couple)	Won	
Premios Juventud	2019	"Créeme" (with Maluma)	Best Song: Can't Get Enough of This Song	Nominated	
Premios Juventud	2019	"Créeme" (with Maluma)	This Is a BTS (Best Behind the Scenes)	Nominated	
Premios Juventud	2019	"Secreto" (with Anuel AA)	Best Song: Singing in the Shower	Won	
Premios Juventud	2019	"Punto G"	Sick Dance Routine (Best Choreography)	Nominated	
Premios Juventud	2020	Karol G	Can't Get Enough (Artist that I follow on social media that I always want to see)	Nominated	
Premios Juventud	2020	Karol G	Breaking the Internet (Artists that post pictures that break the internet)	Nominated	
Premios Juventud	2020	Karol G	Sneakerhead (Loves sneakers more than anything)	Nominated	
Premios Juventud	2020	Karol G	Nailed It (Has the best "Manicute")	Nominated	
Premios Juventud	2020	Karol G and Anuel AA	Together They Fire Up My Feed (Couple or friends that appear on each other's feeds)	Won	
Premios Juventud	2020	Karol G and Anuel AA with Goku	#Pet Goals	Nominated	
Premios Juventud	2020	"China" (with Anuel AA, Daddy Yankee, Ozuna and J Balvin)	The Traffic Jam	Won	
Premios Juventud	2020	"China" (with Anuel AA, Daddy Yankee, Ozuna and J Balvin)	The Perfect Mix (Best Collaboration Song)	Won	
Premios Juventud	2020	"Tusa" (with Nicki Minaj)	Can't Get Enough Of This Song	Won	
Premios Juventud	2021	Karol G	Female Youth Artist of the Year	Won	
Premios Juventud	2021	Karol G	The Trendiest Artist	Won	
Premios Juventud	2021	"Caramelo" (Remix) (with Ozuna and Myke Towers)	La Mezcla Perfecta (Song with the Best Collaboration)	Nominated	
Premios Juventud	2021	"Caramelo" (Remix) (with Ozuna and Myke Towers)	Song of the Year	Nominated	
Premios Juventud	2021	"Bichota"	El Traffic Jam	Won	
Premios Juventud	2021	"Bichota"	La Coreo Más Hot (Hottest Choreography)	Won	
Premios Juventud	2021	"Bichota"	The Social Dance Challenge	Won	
Premios Juventud	2021	"Beautiful Boy" (with Ludacris and Emilee)	OMG Collaboration (Best Collaboration with an Anglo Artist)	Nominated	
Premios Juventud	2021	"X" (with Jonas Brothers)	OMG Collaboration (Best Collaboration with an Anglo Artist)	Nominated	
Premios Juventud	2021	"Ay, Dios Mio!"	La Más Pegajosa (Catchiest Song)	Won	
Premios Juventud	2021	"El Makinon" (with Mariah Angeliq)	Girl Power (Best Female Collaboration)	Nominated	
Premios Juventud	2021	KG0516	Album of the Year	Nominated	
Premios Juventud	2022	Karol G	Artist of the Youth – Female	Won	
Premios Juventud	2022	Karol G	My Favorite Streaming Artist	Won	
Premios Juventud	2022	Karol G	Popular Artist or Influencer	Won	
Premios Juventud	2022	Karol G	Trendiest Artist	Won	
Premios Juventud	2022	"Provenza"	Catchiest Song	Won	
Premios Juventud	2022	"Don't Be Shy" (with Tiësto)	Collaboration OMG	Won	
Premios Juventud	2022	"Don't Be Shy" (with Tiësto)	Best Social Dance Challenge	Won	
Premios Juventud	2022	"Mamiii" (with Becky G)	Best Girl Power Collaboration	Won	
Premios Juventud	2022	"Mamiii" (with Becky G)	Viral Track of the Year	Won	
Premios Juventud	2022	"Poblado" (Remix)	Viral Track of the Year	Nominated	
Premios Juventud	2022	KG0516	Album of the Year	Won	
Premios Juventud	2023	Karol G	Artist of the Youth – Female	Nominated	
Premios Juventud	2023	Karol G	My Favorite Streaming Artist	Won	
Premios Juventud	2023	"TQG" (with Shakira)	Girl Power	Won	
Premios Juventud	2023	"TQG" (with Shakira)	Best Urban Track	Won	
Premios Juventud	2023	"TQG" (with Shakira)	Best Pop/Urban Collaboration	Won	
Premios Juventud	2023	"TQG" (with Shakira)	Social Dance Challenge	Won	
Premios Juventud	2023	"Cairo" (with Ovy on the Drums)	Best Pop/Urban Song	Nominated	
Premios Juventud	2023	Mañana Será Bonito	Best Urban Album – Female	Won	
Premios Juventud	2024	Karol G	Female Artist	Won	
Premios Juventud	2024	"Contigo" (with Tiësto)	OMG Collaboration	Nominated	
Premios Juventud	2024	"Contigo" (with Tiësto)	My Favorite Dance Track	Won	
Premios Juventud	2024	"Labios Mordidos" (with Kali Uchis)	Girl Power	Won	
Premios Juventud	2024	"Qlona" (with Peso Pluma)	Best Urban Track	Won	
Premios Juventud	2024	Mañana Será Bonito (Bichota Season)	Best Urban Album	Won	
Premios Juventud	2025	Karol G	Premios Juventud Artist of the Year	Won	
Premios Juventud	2025	"+57" (with Feid, DFZM, Ovy on the Drums, J Balvin, Maluma, Ryan Castro, & Blessd)	Best Urban Track	Nominated	
Premios Juventud	2025	"Latina Foreva"	Best Pop/Urban Song	Nominated	
Premios Juventud	2025	"Si Antes Te Hubiera Conocido"	Tropical Hit	Won	
Prêmios Likes Brasil	2021	"Ay, Dios Mio!"	Latin Hit of the Summer	Nominated	
Premios Lo Nuestro	2017	Karol G	Female Artist of the Year	Nominated	
Premios Lo Nuestro	2019	Karol G	Female Urban Artist of the Year	Won	
Premios Lo Nuestro	2019	"Mi Mala" (Remix) (with Mau y Ricky feat. Becky G, Leslie Grace and Lali)	Remix of the Year	Nominated	
Premios Lo Nuestro	2019	"Mi Cama" (Remix) (with J Balvin and Nicky Jam)	Video of the Year	Won	
Premios Lo Nuestro	2020	Karol G	Female Urban Artist of the Year	Won	
Premios Lo Nuestro	2020	"Créeme" (with Maluma)	Pop/Rock Collaboration of the Year	Nominated	
Premios Lo Nuestro	2020	"Créeme" (with Maluma)	Urban/Pop Song of the Year	Nominated	
Premios Lo Nuestro	2020	"Secreto" (with Anuel AA)	Urban Collaboration of the Year	Won	
Premios Lo Nuestro	2020	Diosa de la Noche Tour	Tour of the Year	Nominated	
Premios Lo Nuestro	2020	Ocean	Album of the Year	Nominated	
Premios Lo Nuestro	2021	Karol G	Artist of the Year	Nominated	
Premios Lo Nuestro	2021	Karol G	Female Urban Artist of the Year	Won	
Premios Lo Nuestro	2021	"Tusa" (with Nicki Minaj)	Song of the Year	Won	
Premios Lo Nuestro	2021	"Tusa" (with Nicki Minaj)	Crossover Collaboration of the Year	Nominated	
Premios Lo Nuestro	2021	"Tusa" (with Nicki Minaj)	Urban Song of the Year	Nominated	
Premios Lo Nuestro	2021	"Tusa" (with Nicki Minaj)	Urban Collaboration of the Year	Won	
Premios Lo Nuestro	2021	"Caramelo" (Remix) (with Ozuna and Myke Towers)	Remix of the Year	Nominated	
Premios Lo Nuestro	2022	Karol G	Artist of the Year	Nominated	
Premios Lo Nuestro	2022	Karol G	Female Urban Artist of the Year	Won	
Premios Lo Nuestro	2022	"Bichota"	Song of the Year	Won	
Premios Lo Nuestro	2022	"Bichota"	Urban Song of the Year	Won	
Premios Lo Nuestro	2022	"Don't Be Shy" (with Tiësto)	Crossover Collaboration of the Year	Nominated	
Premios Lo Nuestro	2022	"Don't Be Shy" (with Tiësto)	Pop-Urban/Dance Song of the Year	Nominated	
Premios Lo Nuestro	2022	"Location" (with Anuel AA and J Balvin)	Urban Collaboration of the Year	Nominated	
Premios Lo Nuestro	2022	KG0516	Album of the Year	Nominated	
Premios Lo Nuestro	2022	KG0516	Urban Album of the Year	Nominated	
Premios Lo Nuestro	2023	Karol G	Artist of the Year	Won	
Premios Lo Nuestro	2023	Karol G	Female Urban Artist of the Year	Won	
Premios Lo Nuestro	2023	"Mamiii" (with Becky G)	Song of the Year	Won	
Premios Lo Nuestro	2023	"Mamiii" (with Becky G)	Urban/Pop Song of the Year	Nominated	
Premios Lo Nuestro	2023	"Provenza"	Urban Song of the Year	Won	
Premios Lo Nuestro	2023	"Friki" (with Feid)	Urban Collaboration of the Year	Nominated	
Premios Lo Nuestro	2023	Strip Love Tour	Tour of the Year	Nominated	
Premios Lo Nuestro	2024	Karol G	Artist of the Year	Won	
Premios Lo Nuestro	2024	Karol G	Female Urban Artist of the Year	Won	
Premios Lo Nuestro	2024	Mañana Será Bonito	Album of the Year	Won	
Premios Lo Nuestro	2024	Mañana Será Bonito	Urban Album of the Year	Won	
Premios Lo Nuestro	2024	Mañana Será Bonito Tour	Tour of the Year	Won	
Premios Lo Nuestro	2024	"Gatúbela" (with Maldy)	Urban Collaboration of the Year	Won	
Premios Lo Nuestro	2024	"TQG" (with Shakira)	Urban/Pop Song of the Year	Won	
Premios Lo Nuestro	2024	"Tá OK Remix" (with Dennis, MC Kevin O Chris & Maluma)	Urban Dance/Pop Song of the Year	Won	
Premios Lo Nuestro	2024	"Una Noche en Medellín Remix" (with Cris MJ & Ryan Castro)	Remix of the Year	Won	
Premios Lo Nuestro	2025	Karol G	Artist of the Year	Won	
Premios Lo Nuestro	2025	Karol G	Female Urban Artist of the Year	Won	
Premios Lo Nuestro	2025	"Si Antes Te Hubiera Conocido"	Song of the Year	Won	
Premios Lo Nuestro	2025	"Si Antes Te Hubiera Conocido"	Tropical of the Year	Nominated	
Premios Lo Nuestro	2025	"Labios Mordidos" (with Kali Uchis)	Best Female Combination	Nominated	
Premios Lo Nuestro	2025	Mañana Será Bonito (Bichota Season)	Urban Album of the Year	Won	
Premios Lo Nuestro	2025	Mañana Será Bonito Tour	Tour of the Year	Nominated	
Premios Lo Nuestro	2026	Karol G	Artist of the Year	Nominated	
Premios Lo Nuestro	2026	Karol G	Female Urban Artist of the Year	Won	
Premios Lo Nuestro	2026	"Latina Foreva"	Song of the Year	Nominated	
Premios Lo Nuestro	2026	"Latina Foreva"	Urban Song of the Year	Won	
Premios Lo Nuestro	2026	"+57" (with Feid, DFZM, Ovy on the Drums, J Balvin, Maluma, Ryan Castro and Blessd)	Urban Collaboration of the Year	Won	
Premios Lo Nuestro	2026	"Coleccionando Heridas" (with Marco Antonio Solís)	The Perfet Mix	Nominated	
Premios Lo Nuestro	2026	"FKN Movie" (with Mariah Angeliq)	Best Female Combination	Nominated	
Premios Lo Nuestro	2026	Tropicoqueta	Album of the Year	Nominated	
Premios Nuestra Tierra	2020	Karol G	Artist of the Year	Nominated	
Premios Nuestra Tierra	2020	Karol G	Audience Favorite Artist	Nominated	
Premios Nuestra Tierra	2020	Karol G	Best Urban Artist	Nominated	
Premios Nuestra Tierra	2020	"Tusa" (with Nicki Minaj)	Song of the Year	Won	
Premios Nuestra Tierra	2020	"Tusa" (with Nicki Minaj)	Best Urban Song of the Year	Won	
Premios Nuestra Tierra	2020	"Tusa" (with Nicki Minaj)	Best Video	Nominated	
Premios Nuestra Tierra	2020	"Tusa" (with Nicki Minaj)	Audience Favorite Song	Won	
Premios Nuestra Tierra	2021	Karol G	Artist of the Year	Nominated	
Premios Nuestra Tierra	2021	Karol G	Audience Favorite Artist	Nominated	
Premios Nuestra Tierra	2021	Karol G	Best Urban Artist	Nominated	
Premios Nuestra Tierra	2021	"Bichota"	Best Urban Song of the Year	Won	
Premios Nuestra Tierra	2021	"Ay, Dios Mio!"	Best Video	Nominated	
Premios Nuestra Tierra	2021	"Ay, Dios Mio!"	Audience Favorite Song	Nominated	
Premios Nuestra Tierra	2022	Karol G	Artist of the Year	Won	
Premios Nuestra Tierra	2022	Karol G	Best Urban Artist	Won	
Premios Nuestra Tierra	2022	Karol G	Artista Imagen	Nominated	
Premios Nuestra Tierra	2022	Karol G	Audience Favorite Artist	Nominated	
Premios Nuestra Tierra	2022	KG0516	Album of the Year	Nominated	
Premios Nuestra Tierra	2022	"Bichota"	Song of the Year	Nominated	
Premios Nuestra Tierra	2022	"200 Copas"	Song of the Year	Nominated	
Premios Nuestra Tierra	2022	"200 Copas"	Best Popular Song	Won	
Premios Nuestra Tierra	2022	"200 Copas"	Audience Favorite Song	Nominated	
Premios Nuestra Tierra	2022	"El Makinon" (with Mariah Angeliq)	Audience Favorite Song	Nominated	
Premios Nuestra Tierra	2022	"El Makinon" (with Mariah Angeliq)	Best Urban Song	Nominated	
Premios Nuestra Tierra	2022	"Bichota"	Best Urban Song	Won	
Premios Nuestra Tierra	2022	"El Barco"	Best Pop Song	Nominated	
Premios Nuestra Tierra	2022	"Don't Be Shy" (with Tiësto)	Best Dance/Electro Sing	Nominated	
Premios Nuestra Tierra	2022	Bichota Tour	Best Live Performance	Won	
Premios Nuestra Tierra	2023	Karol G	Artist of the Year	Nominated	
Premios Nuestra Tierra	2023	Karol G	Best Urban Artist	Nominated	
Premios Nuestra Tierra	2023	Karol G	Artista Imagen	Won	
Premios Nuestra Tierra	2023	"Provenza"	Song of the Year	Nominated	
Premios Nuestra Tierra	2023	"Mamiii" (with Becky G)	Best Urban Song	Nominated	
Premios Nuestra Tierra	2023	"Gatúbela" (with Maldy)	Best Urban Song	Nominated	
Premios Nuestra Tierra	2023	"Gatúbela" (with Maldy)	Best Urban Collaboration	Nominated	
Premios Nuestra Tierra	2023	"Cairo" (with Ovy on the Drums)	Best Dance/Electronic Song	Won	
Premios Nuestra Tierra	2023	"Cairo" (with Ovy on the Drums)	Video of the Year	Nominated	
Premios Nuestra Tierra	2023	Bichota Tour (Reloaded)	Concert of the Year	Nominated	
Premios Nuestra Tierra	2024	Karol G	Artist of the Year	Won	
Premios Nuestra Tierra	2024	Karol G	Best Urban Artist	Nominated	
Premios Nuestra Tierra	2024	Karol G	Artista Imagen	Won	
Premios Nuestra Tierra	2024	"Mientras Me Curo del Cora"	Song of the Year	Won	
Premios Nuestra Tierra	2024	"Mientras Me Curo del Cora"	Best Pop Song	Won	
Premios Nuestra Tierra	2024	"Qlona" (with Peso Pluma)	Best Urban Song	Nominated	
Premios Nuestra Tierra	2024	"Amargura"	Best Urban Song	Nominated	
Premios Nuestra Tierra	2024	"TQG" (with Shakira)	Best Urban Song	Nominated	
Premios Nuestra Tierra	2024	"TQG" (with Shakira)	Best Urban Collaboration	Won	
Premios Nuestra Tierra	2024	"TQG" (with Shakira)	Best Music Video	Won	
Premios Nuestra Tierra	2024	"Mi Ex Tenía Razón"	Best Popular Song	Nominated	
Premios Nuestra Tierra	2024	"Provenza" (Remix) (with Tiësto)	Best Dance-Electronic Song	Nominated	
Premios Nuestra Tierra	2024	"Cairo" (with Ovy on the Drums)	Best Dance-Electronic Song	Nominated	
Premios Nuestra Tierra	2024	Mañana Será Bonito	Album of the Year	Won	
Premios Nuestra Tierra	2024	Mañana Será Bonito Fest (Medellín)	Best Concert of the Year	Won	
Premios Nuestra Tierra	2025	Karol G	Best Global Artist	Nominated	
Premios Nuestra Tierra	2025	"Si Antes Te Hubiera Conocido"	Best Global Song	Won	
Premios Nuestra Tierra	2025	"Si Antes Te Hubiera Conocido"	Best Tropical Song	Won	
Premios Nuestra Tierra	2025	"Si Antes Te Hubiera Conocido"	Best Viral Song	Nominated	
Premios Nuestra Tierra	2025	Mañana Será Bonito Tour	Best Concert of the Year	Won	
Premios Nuestra Tierra	2025	"+57" (with Feid, DFZM, Ovy on the Drums, J Balvin, Maluma, Ryan Castro, & Blessd)	Best Urban Collaboration	Nominated	
Premios Nuestra Tierra	2026	Karol G	Best Global Artist	Nominated	
Premios Nuestra Tierra	2026	"Papasito"	Best Global Song	Won	
Premios Nuestra Tierra	2026	"Verano Rosa" (with Feid)	Best Urban Collaboration	Won	
Premios Odeón	2021	Karol G	Latin Odeon Artist	Nominated	
Premios Odeón	2022	KG0516	Best Latin Album	Nominated	
Premios Odeón	2022	Karol G	International Odeon Artist	Won	
Premios Odeón	2024	Mañana Será Bonito	Best Latin Album	Won	
Premios Odeón	2025	"Si Antes Te Hubiera Conocido"	Best Latin Song	Won	
Premios Quiero	2018	"Princesa" (with Tini)	Best Female Video	Nominated	
Premios Quiero	2018	"Princesa" (with Tini)	Best Choreography	Won	
Premios Quiero	2018	"Mi Mala" (Remix) (with Mau y Ricky feat. Becky G, Leslie Grace and Lali)	Best Female Video	Won	
Premios Quiero	2019	"Créeme" (with Maluma)	Best Collaboration	Nominated	
Premios Quiero	2020	"Tusa" (with Nicki Minaj)	Video of the Year	Won	
Premios Quiero	2020	"Tusa" (with Nicki Minaj)	Best Urban Video	Nominated	
Premios Quiero	2020	"Tusa" (with Nicki Minaj)	Best Choreography	Nominated	
Premios Quiero	2020	"Tusa (En Casa)"	Best Video from Home	Nominated	
Premios Quiero	2020	Karol G	Best Instagrammer Musician	Nominated	
Premios Quiero	2021	"Bichota"	Best Urban Video	Nominated	
Premios Quiero	2021	"¿Miedito, o Qué?" (Ovy on the Drums and Danny Ocean feat. Karol G)	Best Party Video	Won	
Premios Quiero	2022	"Provenza"	Best Urban Video	Nominated	
Premios Tu Música Urbano	2019	Karol G	International Female Artist	Nominated	
Premios Tu Música Urbano	2019	"Mi Cama"	International Artist Song	Nominated	
Premios Tu Música Urbano	2019	"Mi Cama"	International Artist Video	Nominated	
Premios Tu Música Urbano	2019	"Créeme" (with Maluma)	International Artist Video	Nominated	
Premios Tu Música Urbano	2019	"Culpables" (with Anuel AA)	Collaboration of the Year	Nominated	
Premios Tu Música Urbano	2020	Karol G	Female Artist of the Year	Nominated	
Premios Tu Música Urbano	2020	"Ocean"	Female Song of the Year	Nominated	
Premios Tu Música Urbano	2020	"Tusa" (with Nicki Minaj)	Female Song of the Year	Nominated	
Premios Tu Música Urbano	2020	"China" (with Anuel AA, Daddy Yankee, Ozuna and J Balvin)	Song of the Year	Nominated	
Premios Tu Música Urbano	2020	"China" (with Anuel AA, Daddy Yankee, Ozuna and J Balvin)	Video of the Year	Nominated	
Premios Tu Música Urbano	2020	"China" (with Anuel AA, Daddy Yankee, Ozuna and J Balvin)	Collaboration of the Year	Won	
Premios Tu Música Urbano	2020	"Secreto" (with Anuel AA)	Collaboration of the Year	Nominated	
Premios Tu Música Urbano	2020	Ocean	Female Album of the Year	Nominated	
Premios Tu Música Urbano	2022	Karol G	Artist of the Year	Won	
Premios Tu Música Urbano	2022	Karol G	Top Social Artist	Won	
Premios Tu Música Urbano	2022	"Poblado" (Remix)	Remix of the Year	Won	
Premios Tu Música Urbano	2022	"Mamiii" (with Becky G)	Collaboration of the Year	Won	
Premios Tu Música Urbano	2022	"Don't Be Shy" (with Tiësto)	Top Latin Crossover Song	Won	
Premios Tu Música Urbano	2022	"No Te Deseo El Mal" (with Eladio Carrión)	Top Song — Trap	Won	
Premios Tu Música Urbano	2022	KG0516	Album of the Year – Female Artist	Won	
Premios Tu Música Urbano	2022	"El Makinon" (with Mariah Angeliq)	Video of the Year	Won	
Premios Tu Música Urbano	2022	Bichota Tour	Concert/Tour of the Year	Won	
Premios Tu Música Urbano	2023	Karol G	Artist of the Year	Won	
Premios Tu Música Urbano	2023	"Provenza"	Song of the Year	Won	
Premios Tu Música Urbano	2023	"TQG" (with Shakira)	Collaboration of the Year	Nominated	
Premios Tu Música Urbano	2023	"TQG" (with Shakira)	Video of the Year	Nominated	
Premios Tu Música Urbano	2023	"X Si Volvemos" (with Romeo Santos)	Top Song — Pop Urban	Won	
Premios Tu Música Urbano	2023	"Cairo" (with Ovy on the Drums)	Top Song — Pop Urban	Nominated	
Premios Tu Música Urbano	2023	"Ojos Ferrari" (with Justin Quiles and Ángel Dior)	Top Song — Dembow	Won	
Premios Tu Música Urbano	2023	Strip Love Tour	Concert/Tour of the Year	Won	
Premios Tu Música Urbano	2023	Mañana Será Bonito	Album of the Year – Female Artist	Won	
Premios Tu Música Urbano	2025	Karol G	Artist of the Year	Nominated	
Premios Tu Música Urbano	2025	"Si Antes Te Hubiera Conocido"	Song of the Year	Nominated	
Premios Tu Música Urbano	2026	Karol G	Artist of the Year	Nominated	
Premios Tu Música Urbano	2026	"Latina Foreva"	Song of the Year	Nominated	
Premios Tu Música Urbano	2026	"Verano Rosa" (with Feid)	Collaboration of the Year	Nominated	
Premios Tu Música Urbano	2026	"Coleccionando Heridas" (with Marco Antonio Solís)	Collaboration of the Year	Nominated	
Premios Tu Música Urbano	2026	"Milagros"	Top Song — Pop	Nominated	
Premios Tu Música Urbano	2026	"Papasito"	Top Song — Tropical	Nominated	
Premios Tu Música Urbano	2026	"Un Gatito Me Llamó"	Top Song — Dembow	Nominated	
Premios Tu Música Urbano	2026	Tropicoqueta	Album of the Year – Female Artist	Won	
Rolling Stone en Español Awards	2023	Mañana Será Bonito	Album of the Year	Nominated	
Rolling Stone en Español Awards	2023	"Provenza"	Song of the Year	Nominated	
Rolling Stone en Español Awards	2023	"Provenza"	Music Video of the Year	Nominated	
Rolling Stone en Español Awards	2023	Karol G	Artist of the Year	Nominated	
Spotify Awards	2020	Karol G	Most-Streamed Female Artist	Won	
Spotify Plaques	2021	"Tusa" (with Nicki Minaj)	One Billion Streams Award	Won	
Spotify Plaques	2022	"China" (with Anuel AA, Daddy Yankee, Ozuna and J Balvin)	One Billion Streams Award	Won	
Spotify Plaques	2023	"Provenza"	One Billion Streams Award	Won	
Spotify Plaques	2024	"TQG" (with Shakira)	One Billion Streams Award	Won	
Spotify Plaques	2024	"Qlona" (with Peso Pluma)	One Billion Streams Award	Won	
Spotify Plaques	2024	"Mamiii" (with Becky G)	One Billion Streams Award	Won	
Spotify Plaques	2025	"Si Antes Te Hubiera Conocido"	One Billion Streams Award	Won	
Spotify Plaques	2025	"Amargura"	One Billion Streams Award	Won	
Telehit Awards	2019	"China" (with Anuel AA, Daddy Yankee, Ozuna and J Balvin)	Best Urban Song of the Year	Nominated	
Telehit Awards	2019	"China" (with Anuel AA, Daddy Yankee, Ozuna and J Balvin)	Best Urban Video of the Year	Nominated	
Telehit Awards	2019	Karol G	Female Artist of the Year	Nominated	
Urban Music Awards	2023	Karol G	Artist of the Year – South America	Nominated	
WME Awards	2021	"El Makinon" (with Mariah Angeliq)	Latin American Song	Won	
WME Awards	2022	"Provenza"	Latin American Song	Nominated	
WME Awards	2023	"TQG" (with Shakira)	Latin American Song	Nominated	
WME Awards	2024	"Si Antes Te Hubiera Conocido"	Latin American Song	Nominated	
WME Awards	2025	"Si Antes Te Hubiera Conocido"	Latin American Song	Nominated	

== Other accolades ==
=== Listicles ===
Name of publisher, name of listicle, year(s) listed, and placement result
Publisher	Listicle	Year	Result	Ref.
Billboard	Billboard's 20 Best Latin Songs	2017	12th ("Ahora Me Llama")	
Billboard	Billboard's 20 Best Latin Songs	2018	18th ("Mi Cama")	
Billboard	Billboard's 20 Best Latin Songs	2018	13rd ("Calypso (Remix)")	
Billboard	The 25 Best Latin Songs	2021	Placed ("200 Copas")	
Billboard	Billboard's 100 Best Songs	2022	56th ("Mamiii")	
Billboard	50 Best Songs	2023	15th ("TQG")	
Bloomberg Linea	Impact Women in Latin America	2023	Placed	
¡Hola!	15 Latin Hits That Made Us Dance and Sing	2022	Placed ("Mamiii")	
Latina	Top 20 Songs	2022	8th ("Mamiii")	
Los Angeles Times	The 100 Best Songs	2022	26th ("Mamiii")	
People en Español	25 Most Powerful Women	2022	10th	
Rolling Stone	Best Latin Singles	2018	4th ("Mi Cama")	
Rolling Stone	100 Greatest Reggaeton Songs of All Time	2022	75th ("Mi Cama (Remix)")	
Rolling Stone	100 Greatest Reggaeton Songs of All Time	2022	65th ("Mamiii")	
Rolling Stone	100 Greatest Reggaeton Songs of All Time	2022	18th ("Tusa")	
Telemundo	Queens of Urban Music	2022	Placed	
Tidal	Best Songs	2022	24th ("Mamiii")	
UPROXX	The Best Songs	2022	Placed ("Mamiii")	
