= Cairo (Karol G and Ovy on the Drums song) =

Single by Karol G and Ovy on the Drums

from the album Mañana Será Bonito
- Language: Spanish
- Released: November 13, 2022
- Genre: Reggaeton; Afrobeats
- Length: 3:21
- Label: Universal Latino
- Songwriters: Carolina Giraldo; Daniel Echavarría; Kevyn Cruz
- Producer: Ovy on the Drums

Karol G singles chronology
| "Gatúbela" (2022) | "Cairo" (2022) | "X Si Volvemos" (2022) |

Ovy on the Drums singles chronology
| "Sin Señal" (2022) | "Cairo" (2022) | "Chao Bebé" (2022) |

Music video
- "Cairo" on YouTube

"Cairo" (stylized in all caps) is a song by Colombian singer-songwriter Karol G and Colombian record-producer Ovy on the Drums. It was written by Karol G, Keityn and Ovy on the Drums, and produced by the latter. The song was released on November 13, 2022, through Universal Music Latino, as the third single from her fourth studio album, Mañana Será Bonito (2023).

== Background ==
The song was announced on November 8, 2022, through Karol G's social media platforms. The song was released on November 13, 2022.

== Commercial performance ==
"Cairo" debuted at number 8 on the US Bubbling Under Hot 100 during the chart dated December 3, 2022. During its 8th week on the chart, the song reached a new peak at number 7 on the chart dated February 4, 2023. During the release of its parent album, Mañana Será Bonito, the song entered the US Billboard Hot 100 chart at number 82. It became Ovy on the Drums' first entry on the chart.

On the US Billboard Hot Latin Songs chart dated November 26, 2022, the song debuted at number 16, becoming Ovy on the Drums highest debut and peaking song on the chart. The following week the song reached a new peak at number 11 on the chart dated December 3, 2022. It became Giraldo's twentieth top 15 and Drums' first on the chart.

On the Billboard Global 200 the song debuted at number 89 on the chart dated December 3, 2022, becoming Drums' first entry on the chart. On the chart dated March 11, 2023, the song reached its peak of 51.

== Awards and nominations ==
Awards and nominations for "Cairo"
| Year | Ceremony | Category | Result |
|---|---|---|---|
| 2023 | Heat Latin Music Awards | Best Music Video | Nominated |
| 2023 | Premios Juventud | Best Pop/Urban Song | Nominated |
| 2023 | Premios Nuestra Tierra | Best Dance/Electronic Song | Won |
| 2023 | Premios Tu Música Urbano | Top Song — Pop Urban | Nominated |
| 2025 | BMI Latin Awards | Award Winning Song | Won |

== Music video ==
The music video for "Cairo" was directed by Pedro Artola, shot in Cairo and was released on Karol G's YouTube channel on November 13, 2022.

== Live performances ==
At the 23rd Annual Latin Grammy Awards, held on November 17, 2022, Karol G performed a mash-up of "Provenza", "Gatúbela" and "Cairo". On March 10, 2023, Karol G performed "Cairo" in Puerto Rico for a three-day stadium-show to promote the album Mañana Será Bonito. From August 10, 2023, to July 23, 2024, Karol G embarked on the arena-stadium Mañana Será Bonito Tour, where "Cairo" was present throughout the set list.

== Charts ==
=== Weekly charts ===
Weekly chart performance for "Cairo"
| Chart (2022) | Peak position |
|---|---|
| Argentina Hot 100 (Billboard) | 53 |
| Argentina (Monitor Latino) | 13 |
| Bolivia (Billboard) | 23 |
| Bolivia (Monitor Latino) | 14 |
| Central America (Monitor Latino) | 1 |
| Chile (Billboard) | 25 |
| Colombia (Billboard) | 12 |
| Colombia (Monitor Latino) | 14 |
| Costa Rica (Monitor Latino) | 13 |
| Dominican Republic (Monitor Latino) | 8 |
| Ecuador (Billboard) | 21 |
| Ecuador (Monitor Latino) | 15 |
| El Salvador (Monitor Latino) | 9 |
| Global 200 (Billboard) | 51 |
| Guatemala (Monitor Latino) | 5 |
| Honduras (Monitor Latino) | 6 |
| Latin America (Monitor Latino) | 5 |
| Nicaragua (Monitor Latino) | 3 |
| Panama (Monitor Latino) | 7 |
| Peru (Billboard) | 19 |
| Peru (Monitor Latino) | 5 |
| Puerto Rico (Monitor Latino) | 3 |
| Spain (PROMUSICAE) | 14 |
| US Billboard Hot 100 | 82 |
| US Hot Latin Songs (Billboard) | 11 |
| US Latin Airplay (Billboard) | 17 |
| US Latin Rhythm Airplay (Billboard) | 8 |
| US Rhythmic Airplay (Billboard) | 24 |
| Venezuela (Monitor Latino) | 13 |

=== Year-end charts ===
Year-end chart performance for "Cairo"
| Chart (2023) | Position |
|---|---|
| Global Excl. US (Billboard) | 196 |
| US Hot Latin Songs (Billboard) | 44 |

== Certifications ==
Certifications and sales for "Cairo"
| Region | Certification | Certified units/sales |
|---|---|---|
| Spain (Promusicae) | 4× Platinum | 240,000^{‡} |
| United States (RIAA) | 4× Platinum (Latin) | 240,000^{‡} |
^{‡} Sales+streaming figures based on certification alone.
