= Contigo (song) =

Single by Karol G and Tiësto
- Language: Spanish
- English title: "With You"
- Released: February 14, 2024
- Genre: Pop; EDM
- Length: 3:13
- Label: Bichota; Interscope
- Songwriters: Ryan Tedder; Björn Djupström; Tyler Spry; Tijs Michiel Verwest; Carolina Giraldo Navarro; Yasmani Luis Bandera Clark; Jesse McCartney
- Producers: Karol G; Tiësto; Ryan Tedder; Björn Djupström; Tyler Spry

Karol G singles chronology
"Labios Mordidos" (2023)	"Contigo" (2024)	"Si Antes Te Hubiera Conocido" (2024)

Tiësto singles chronology
"Waterslides" (2024)	"Contigo" (2024)

Music video
- "Contigo" on YouTube

"Contigo" (transl. "With You") is a song by Colombian singer Karol G and Dutch DJ Tiësto. It was released through Bichota Records and Interscope on February 14, 2024, the same day as Valentine's Day and Karol G's birthday. The song's entire melody is interpolated directly from "Bleeding Love" (2007) by Leona Lewis.

"Contigo" is the third collaboration between Karol G and Tiësto, after "Don't Be Shy" (2021) and the remix of "Provenza" (2023).

== Background and release ==
On February 7, 2024, the singer announced through her social networks a part of the song's lyrics, which says "No quiero vida si no es contigo". Later, she announced the release date of the song, February 14, the same day as her birthday. A day before the release, she posted a preview of the music video.

== Music video ==
The music video was released along with the single on February 14, 2024. It has a special appearance by the Puerto Rican rapper and singer Young Miko.

== Charts ==
=== Weekly charts ===
Weekly chart performance for "Contigo"
Chart (2024)	Peak position
Argentina Hot 100 (Billboard)	34
Argentina (Monitor Latino)	1
Belarus Airplay (TopHit)	114
Bolivia (Monitor Latino)	2
Central America (Monitor Latino)	1
Central America + Caribbean (FONOTICA)	1
Chile (Billboard)	21
Chile (Monitor Latino)	1
CIS Airplay (TopHit)	141
Colombia (Billboard)	7
Colombia (Monitor Latino)	5
Costa Rica (Monitor Latino)	1
Dominican Republic (Monitor Latino)	2
Ecuador (Billboard)	11
Ecuador (Monitor Latino)	2
El Salvador (Monitor Latino)	1
Global 200 (Billboard)	24
Guatemala (Monitor Latino)	1
Honduras (Monitor Latino)	5
Latin America (Monitor Latino)	1
Latvia Airplay (TopHit)	3
Lithuania Airplay (TopHit)	7
Mexico (Billboard)	22
Netherlands (Tipparade)	17
New Zealand Hot Singles (RMNZ)	31
Nicaragua (Monitor Latino)	1
Panama (Monitor Latino)	2
Panama (PRODUCE)	3
Paraguay (Monitor Latino)	3
Peru (Billboard)	19
Peru (Monitor Latino)	3
Portugal (AFP)	197
Romania Airplay (TopHit)	30
San Marino (SMRRTV Top 50)	38
Spain (PROMUSICAE)	7
Sweden Heatseeker (Sverigetopplistan)	16
Switzerland (Schweizer Hitparade)	58
Ukraine Airplay (TopHit)	131
Uruguay (Monitor Latino)	15
US Billboard Hot 100	61
US Hot Dance/Electronic Songs (Billboard)	5
US Hot Latin Songs (Billboard)	3
US Latin Airplay (Billboard)	27
US Latin Pop Airplay (Billboard)	2
Venezuela (Monitor Latino)	9

=== Monthly charts ===
Monthly chart performance for "Contigo"
Chart (2024)	Position
Latvia Airplay (TopHit)	39
Lithuania Airplay (TopHit)	24
Romania Airplay (TopHit)	39

=== Year-end charts ===
Year-end chart performance for "Contigo"
Chart (2024)	Position
Spain (PROMUSICAE)	44
US Hot Dance/Electronic Songs (Billboard)	13
US Hot Latin Songs (Billboard)	30

== Certifications ==
Certifications for "Contigo"
Region	Certification	Certified units/sales
Brazil (Pro-Música Brasil)	Platinum	40,000^{‡}
Spain (Promusicae)	2× Platinum	120,000^{‡}
^{‡} Sales+streaming figures based on certification alone.
