= Labios Mordidos =

Single by Kali Uchis and Karol G

from the album Orquídeas
- Language: Spanish
- English title: "Bitten Lips"
- Released: November 23, 2023
- Genre: Reggaeton; pop
- Length: 3:15
- Label: Geffen
- Songwriters: Karly Loaiza; Manuel Lara; Alberto Meléndez; Brandon Cores; Carolina Giraldo; Cristina Chiluiza
- Producers: Lara; Albert Hype; Austen Jux-Chandler

Kali Uchis singles chronology
"Te Mata" (2023)	"Labios Mordidos" (2023)	"Igual que un Ángel" (2024)

Karol G singles chronology
"Qlona" (2023)	"Labios Mordidos" (2023)	"Contigo" (2023)

Music video
- "Labios Mordidos" on YouTube

"Labios Mordidos" (Spanish: [ˈlaβjos moɾˈðiðos], transl. "Bitten Lips") is a song by American singer Kali Uchis and Colombian singer Karol G. It was released on November 23, 2023, through Geffen Records as the third single from Uchis' fourth studio album, Orquídeas (2024).

== Background and composition ==
As Kali Uchis and Karol G began a friendship, they planned to record music together. The latter revealed that they wrote several songs during their visits to each other homes. From that sessions, they finished two songs: "Me Tengo Que Ir", which was released on Karol G's second mixtape Mañana Será Bonito (Bichota Season) (2023) and an undisclosed song that would be released in one Uchis works. On October 18, 2023, Uchis revealed the song with Karol G to be titled "Labios Mordidos", which was recorded for her fourth studio album Orquídeas (2024).

"Labios Mordidos" is a reggaeton and pop song, produced by Albert Hype, Austen Jux-Chandler, and Manuel Lara. A song with sapphic themes, it details the flirtation between two women. "Labios Mordidos" features a sample of Chaka Demus & Pliers' song "Murder She Wrote".

== Release and promotion ==
Uchis first performed her part of "Labios Mordidos" during her set at Lollapalooza Brazil 2023. Karol G also teased the song's release during an interview with Rolling Stone, hinting to be released in November 2023. She later sang part of "Labios Mordidos" as a medley with "Qlona" and "Ojos Ferrari" during her performance at the 2023 Billboard Music Awards.

Both Uchis and Karol G posted the song's release date, with the former uploading photos taken on the music video's set. "Labios Mordidos" premiered as the third single from Orquídeas on November 23, 2023, at 21:00 PT (5:00 UTC on November 24, 2023).

== Critical reception ==
Cyrena Touros, writing for Stereogum classified the song as a "Mambo No. 5" for lesbian Latinas.

== Accolades ==
Awards and nominations for "Labios Mordidos"
Year	Ceremony	Category	Result	Ref.
2024	Latin Grammy Awards	Best Reggaeton Performance	Nominated	

== Music video ==
A music video for "Labios Mordidos" was directed by Shan Phearon (TK) and released on November 24, 2023. The film-styled visual sees both Uchis and Karol G dancing together at a female-only party, concluding with a scene of the singers walking behind an explosion.

== Charts ==
Chart performance for "Labios Mordidos"
Chart (2023–2024)	Peak position
Colombia (Billboard)	15
Costa Rica (Monitor Latino)	14
Global 200 (Billboard)	108
New Zealand Hot Singles (RMNZ)	23
Puerto Rico (Monitor Latino)	15
Spain (PROMUSICAE)	59
US Billboard Hot 100	97
US Hot Latin Songs (Billboard)	10
US Latin Airplay (Billboard)	48
US Latin Rhythm Airplay (Billboard)	17

=== Year-end charts ===
Year-end chart performance for "Labios Mordidos"
Chart (2024)	Position
US Hot Latin Songs (Billboard)	73
US Latin Rhythm Airplay (Billboard)	46

== Certifications ==
Certifications for "Labios Mordidos"
Region	Certification	Certified units/sales
Brazil (Pro-Música Brasil)	Gold	20,000^{‡}
Streaming
Central America (CFC)	Gold	3,500,000^{†}
^{‡} Sales+streaming figures based on certification alone.^{†} Streaming-only figures based on certification alone.
