= Gatúbela =

2022 single by Karol G and Maldy

Single by Karol G and Maldy

from the album Mañana Será Bonito
- Language: Spanish
- English title: "Catwoman"
- Released: August 25, 2022
- Genre: Reggaeton
- Length: 3:29
- Label: Universal Latino
- Songwriters: Carolina Giraldo; Edwin Vázquez; Justin Quiles; Julio González; Marvin Hawkins
- Producers: Karol G; DJ Maff

Karol G singles chronology
"Provenza" (2022)	"Gatúbela" (2022)	"Cairo" (2022)

Maldy singles chronology
"Se Le Ve" (2022)	"Gatúbela" (2022)	"Tiempos de Plan B" (2023)

Music video
- "Gatúbela" on YouTube

"Gatúbela" (transl. "Catwoman"; stylized in all caps) is a song by Colombian singer-songwriter Karol G and Puerto Rican rapper Maldy. Written alongside DJ Maff, Justin Quiles and Lenny Tavárez, and produced by DJ Maff and Navarro, the song was released on August 25, 2022, through Universal Music Latino, as the second single from her fourth studio album, Mañana Será Bonito (2023).

== Background ==
The song was announced a day prior to its release through Karol G's social media platforms. The song was released the following day on August 25, 2022.

== Critical reception ==
Jessica Roiz from Billboard described Karol G on the track as "fiery and unapologetic" and the song as "an infectious old-school reggaeton laced with intense perreo beats.

== Commercial performance ==
"Gatúbela" debuted and peaked at number 37 on the US Billboard Hot 100 chart dated September 10, 2022. It became Giraldo's fifth top 40 hit and Maldy's first entry as a soloist.

On the US Billboard Hot Latin Songs chart dated September 10, 2022 the song debuted and peaked at number 4, becoming Giraldo's milestone tenth top five on the chart. It became Maldy's first top ten and first appearance on the chart as a soloist.

On the Billboard Global 200 the song debuted and peaked at number 23 on the chart dated September 10, 2022.

== Awards and nominations ==
Awards and nominations for "Gatúbela"
Year	Ceremony	Category	Result
2023	Latin Grammy Awards	Best Reggaeton Performance	Nominated
2023	Latino Music Awards	Best Urban Song	Won
2023	Premios Nuestra Tierra	Best Urban Song	Nominated
2023	Premios Nuestra Tierra	Best Urban Collaboration	Nominated
2024	Lo Nuestro Awards	Urban Collaboration of the Year	Won
2024	BMI Latin Awards	Award Winning Song	Won

== Music video ==
The music video for "Gatúbela" was directed by Pedro Artola and was released on Karol G's YouTube channel on August 25, 2022.

== Live performances ==
Giraldo performed "Gatúbela" live for the first time on September 7, 2022, while embarking on the Strip Love Tour. At the 23rd Annual Latin Grammy Awards, held on November 17, 2022, Karol G performed a mash-up of "Provenza", "Gatúbela" and "Cairo". On February 19, 2023, Karol G was the headlining act for Viña Del Mar International Song Festival, where "Gatúbela" was performed. On March 10, 2023, Karol G performed "Gatúbela" in Puerto Rico for a three-day stadium-show to promote the album Mañana Será Bonito. From August 10, 2023, to July 23, 2024, Karol G embarked on the arena-stadium Mañana Será Bonito Tour, where "Gatúbela" was present throughout the set list.

== Charts ==
=== Weekly charts ===
Weekly chart performance for "Gatúbela"
Chart (2022)	Peak position
Argentina Hot 100 (Billboard)	36
Bolivia (Billboard)	13
Bolivia (Monitor Latino)	6
Central America (Monitor Latino)	1
Chile (Billboard)	13
Colombia (Billboard)	1
Colombia (Monitor Latino)	11
Costa Rica (Monitor Latino)	10
Dominican Republic (Monitor Latino)	3
Ecuador (Billboard)	9
Ecuador (Monitor Latino)	8
El Salvador (Monitor Latino)	4
Global 200 (Billboard)	23
Guatemala (Monitor Latino)	3
Honduras (Monitor Latino)	1
Latin America (Monitor Latino)	7
Mexico (Billboard)	18
Nicaragua (Monitor Latino)	1
Panama (Monitor Latino)	10
Paraguay (Monitor Latino)	15
Peru (Billboard)	12
Peru (Monitor Latino)	5
Puerto Rico (Monitor Latino)	5
Spain (PROMUSICAE)	17
Uruguay (Monitor Latino)	10
US Billboard Hot 100	37
US Hot Latin Songs (Billboard)	4
US Latin Airplay (Billboard)	5
US Latin Rhythm Airplay (Billboard)	1

=== Year-end charts ===
2022 year-end chart performance for "Gatúbela"
Chart (2022)	Position
US Hot Latin Songs (Billboard)	37

== Certifications ==
Certifications and sales for "Gatúbela"
Region	Certification	Certified units/sales
Brazil (Pro-Música Brasil)	Gold	20,000^{‡}
Canada (Music Canada)	Gold	40,000^{‡}
Spain (Promusicae)	2× Platinum	120,000^{‡}
United States (RIAA)	13× Platinum (Latin)	780,000^{‡}
^{‡} Sales+streaming figures based on certification alone.
