= Amargura =

Single by Karol G

from the album Mañana Será Bonito
- Language: Spanish
- English title: "Bitterness"
- Released: May 19, 2023
- Genre: Reggaeton
- Length: 2:50
- Label: Universal Latino
- Songwriters: Carolina Giraldo; Daniel Echavarria; Kevyn Cruz; Alonso Catalino Curet
- Producer: Ovy on the Drums

Karol G singles chronology
"Mientras Me Curo del Cora" (2023)	"Amargura" (2023)	"S91" (2023)

Visualizer
- "Amargura (Visualizer)" on YouTube

"Amargura" (stylized in all caps; transl. "Bitterness") is a song by Colombian singer-songwriter Karol G. It was written by Giraldo, Keityn and Ovy on the Drums and produced by the latter, with Tite Curet Alonso receiving credits for its sample of "La Cura" by Frankie Ruiz. The song was released on May 19, 2023, through Universal Music Latino, as the seventh and final single from her fourth studio album, Mañana Será Bonito.

== Background ==
"Amargura" was first revealed as a track on Karol G's then-upcoming fourth studio album. The song was officially released on February 24, 2023, alongside the release of its parent album, Mañana Será Bonito. It was later released as a single on May 19, 2023.

== Commercial performance ==
"Amargura" debuted at number 16 on the US Bubbling Under Hot 100 chart dated March 11, 2023, during the release of its parent album, Mañana Será Bonito. On the chart dated August 29, 2023, the song reached a new peak of number 2. Following the release of the mixtape and B-side to Mañana Será Bonito, Mañana Será Bonito (Bichota Season), "Amargura" debuted on the US Billboard Hot 100 at number 95. The song reached its final peak on the chart dated September 2, 2023 at number 85.

On the US Billboard Hot Latin Songs chart dated March 11, 2023, the song debuted at number 24. On the chart dated September 2, 2023, the song reached its peak of number 14.

== Awards and nominations ==
Awards and nominations for "Amargura"
Year	Ceremony	Category	Result
2024	Premios Nuestra Tierra	Best Urban Song	Nominated
2025	BMI Latin Awards	Award Winning Song	Won
2025	Spotify Plaques	One Billion Streams Award	Won

== Audio visualizer ==
An audio visualizer for "Amargura" was released on Karol G's YouTube channel on February 24, 2023, along with other audio visualizer videos for songs on Mañana Será Bonito.

== Live performances ==
On March 10, 2023, Karol G performed "Amargura" for the first time in Puerto Rico for a three-day stadium show promoting the release of Mañana Será Bonito. On July 10, 2023, Giraldo performed the song for the Today morning show. The song was performed once again on August 4, 2024, for the Lollapalooza music festival. From August 10, 2023, to July 23, 2024, Karol G embarked on the arena-stadium Mañana Será Bonito Tour, where the song was present throughout the set list.

== Charts ==
=== Weekly charts ===
Weekly chart performance for "Amargura"
Chart (2023–2024)	Peak position
Argentina Hot 100 (Billboard)	97
Bolivia (Billboard)	18
Bolivia (Monitor Latino)	8
Central America (Monitor Latino)	8
Chile (Billboard)	8
Chile (Monitor Latino)	11
Colombia (Billboard)	1
Colombia (Monitor Latino)	3
Costa Rica (Monitor Latino)	8
Dominican Republic (Monitor Latino)	4
Ecuador (Billboard)	4
Ecuador (Monitor Latino)	3
El Salvador (Monitor Latino)	11
Global 200 (Billboard)	71
Guatemala (Monitor Latino)	11
Latin America (Monitor Latino)	5
Nicaragua (Monitor Latino)	3
Panama (Monitor Latino)	11
Peru (Billboard)	4
Peru (Monitor Latino)	2
Spain (PROMUSICAE)	16
US Billboard Hot 100	85
US Hot Latin Songs (Billboard)	14
US Latin Airplay (Billboard)	6
US Latin Rhythm Airplay (Billboard)	3

=== Year-end charts ===
2023 year-end chart performance for "Amargura"
Chart (2023)	Position
Global 200 (Billboard)	172
US Hot Latin Songs (Billboard)	32

2024 year-end chart performance for "Amargura"
Chart (2024)	Position
Global 200 (Billboard)	108
Spain (PROMUSICAE)	33

== Certifications ==
Certifications for "Amargura"
Region	Certification	Certified units/sales
Brazil (Pro-Música Brasil)	Platinum	40,000^{‡}
Canada (Music Canada)	Platinum	80,000^{‡}
Spain (Promusicae)	5× Platinum	300,000^{‡}
^{‡} Sales+streaming figures based on certification alone.

== See also ==
- List of best-selling singles in Spain
