= X Si Volvemos =

Single by Karol G and Romeo Santos

from the album Mañana Será Bonito
- Language: Spanish
- English title: "If We Get Back Together"
- Released: February 2, 2023
- Genre: Reggaeton
- Length: 3:20
- Label: Universal Latino
- Songwriters: Carolina Giraldo Navarro; Anthony Santos; Daniel Echaverría; Ernesto Padilla; Josías de la Cruz; Juan Luis Morena; Llandel Veguilla; Kevyn Cruz
- Producer: Ovy on the Drums

Karol G singles chronology
"Cairo" (2022)	"X Si Volvemos" (2023)	"TQG" (2023)

Romeo Santos singles chronology
"Solo Conmigo" (2022)	"X Si Volvemos" (2023)	"Suegra" (2023)

"X Si Volvemos" (stylized in all caps; a shortened abbreviation for Por Si Volvemos (transl. "If We Get Back Together")) is a song by Colombian singer-songwriter Karol G and American singer Romeo Santos. It was written by Giraldo, Santos, Nesty la Mente Maestra, Nely el Arma Secreta, Wisin, Yandel, Keityn and Ovy on the Drums, and produced by the latter. The song was released on February 2, 2023, through Universal Music Latino, as the fourth single from Karol G's fourth studio album, Mañana Será Bonito (2023).

== Background ==
The single was announced on January 31, 2023, through Karol G's social media platforms, along with the title and announcement of Santo's participation. The song was released on February 2, 2023. According to Rolling Stone, Karol G had already recorded the song before adding Santos to the verse.

== Composition ==
According to the transcribed sheet music, "X Si Volvemos" is written and recorded in the key of E Major, with 88 beats per minute (BPM) and tuned at a frequency of 440 Hertz (Hz). The chord progression follows F♯m / C♯m / E / B, with accidental chords Dm, D, Bm, A and A♯. The song's modality fluctuates between E Major and F♯ Dorian (minor).

== Commercial performance ==
On the US Billboard Hot 100 chart dated February 18, 2023, "X Si Volvemos" debuted at number 56 on the week of March 11, 2023. During its fourth week charting, following the release of its parent album, Mañana Será Bonito, the song reached a new peak of number 48.

On the US Billboard Hot Latin Songs chart dated February 18, 2023, the song debuted at number 5. On the chart dated March 11, 2023, the song reached a new peak of number 4.

On the Billboard Global 200, the song debuted at number 30 on the chart dated February 18, 2023. On its fourth week on the chart dated March 11, 2023, the song reached a peak of number 18, becoming Giraldo's sixth top twentieth and Santos' second-overall entry on the chart.

== Awards and nominations ==
Awards and nominations for "X Si Volvemos"
Year	Ceremony	Category	Result
2023	Latino Music Awards	Best Tropical Song	Won
2023	Premios Tu Música Urbano	Top Song — Pop Urban	Won
2025	BMI Latin Awards	Award Winning Song	Won

== Audio visualizer ==
An audio visualizer for "X Si Volvemos" was released on Karol G’s YouTube channel on February 2, 2023.

== Charts ==
=== Weekly charts ===
Weekly chart performance for "X Si Volvemos"
Chart (2023)	Peak position
Argentina Hot 100 (Billboard)	51
Bolivia (Billboard)	21
Bolivia (Monitor Latino)	8
Chile (Billboard)	7
Chile (Monitor Latino)	12
Colombia (Billboard)	6
Colombia (Monitor Latino)	16
Colombia Streaming (PROMÚSICA)	8
Costa Rica (FONOTICA)	17
Costa Rica (Monitor Latino)	19
Dominican Republic (Monitor Latino)	3
Dominican Republic (SODINPRO)	12
Ecuador (Billboard)	5
El Salvador (Monitor Latino)	19
Global 200 (Billboard)	18
Guatemala (Monitor Latino)	1
Honduras (Monitor Latino)	4
Latin America (Monitor Latino)	7
Mexico (Billboard)	21
Nicaragua (Monitor Latino)	7
Panama (Monitor Latino)	17
Panama (PRODUCE)	24
Paraguay (Monitor Latino)	13
Peru (Billboard)	9
Spain (PROMUSICAE)	9
Spain (Billboard)	15
Switzerland (Schweizer Hitparade)	74
US Billboard Hot 100	48
US Hot Latin Songs (Billboard)	4
US Latin Airplay (Billboard)	40
US Latin Rhythm Airplay (Billboard)	12
Venezuela (Record Report)	27

=== Monthly charts ===
Monthly chart performance for "X Si Volvemos"
Chart (2023)	Peak position
Paraguay (SGP)	25

=== Year-end charts ===
Year-end chart performance for "X Si Volvemos"
Chart (2023)	Position
Global 200 (Billboard)	200
US Hot Latin Songs (Billboard)	36

== Certifications ==
Certifications for "X Si Volvemos"
Region	Certification	Certified units/sales
Brazil (Pro-Música Brasil)	Gold	20,000^{‡}
Canada (Music Canada)	Gold	40,000^{‡}
Spain (Promusicae)	3× Platinum	180,000^{‡}
United States (RIAA)	Gold (Latin)	30,000^{‡}
^{‡} Sales+streaming figures based on certification alone.

== See also ==
- List of best-selling singles in Spain
