= Mientras Me Curo del Cora =

2023 single by Karol G

Single by Karol G

from the album Mañana Será Bonito
- Language: Spanish
- English title: "While I Heal My Heart"
- Released: March 7, 2023
- Genre: Latin pop; R&B
- Length: 2:44
- Label: Universal Latino
- Songwriters: Carolina Giraldo; Daniel Echavarria; Kevyn Cruz; Robert McFerrin Jr.
- Producer: Ovy on the Drums

Karol G singles chronology
"TQG" (2023)	"Mientras Me Curo del Cora" (2023)	"Amargura" (2023)

Music video
- "Mientras Me Curo del Cora" on YouTube

"Mientras Me Curo del Cora" (stylized in all caps; transl. "While I Heal My Heart") is a song by Colombian singer-songwriter Karol G. It was written by Karol G, Keityn and Ovy on the Drums and produced by the latter, with Bobby McFerrin receiving credits for its sample of "Don't Worry, Be Happy". The song was released on March 7, 2023, through Universal Music Latino, as the sixth single from her fourth studio album, Mañana Será Bonito.

== Background ==
"Mientras Me Curo del Cora" was first teased at the Viña Del Mar International Song Festival on February 19, 2023, where a part of the song was performed live by Karol G for the first time. She also revealed that the song was featured on her then-upcoming fourth studio album. The song was officially released on February 24, 2023, alongside the release of its album, Mañana Será Bonito as the opening track of the album.

== Composition ==
The song was inspired by a trip the singer took to Maasai Mara reserve in Kenya, where she was touched by a vocal performance of some of the locals. After that, Karol G connected with Linda Goldstein, the producer of "Don't Worry, Be Happy" by Bobby McFerrin, to sample it. Goldstein crafted the intricate vocal arrangements of "Mientras Me Curo del Cora", and also added the sample that plays at the start.

== Critical reception ==
Ernesto Lechner of Rolling Stone wrote that the song determines the "epic post-breakup mode" opening of the album in which the singer "reassures our wounded hearts that it's ok to feel sad at times". Lechner prized the production of Ovy on the Drums, defining him as "a digital architect able to inject a sense of purpose into the most tired reggaeton back beat". Billboard described the song as "sweet and joyous" with "simplicity in terms of production".

== Commercial performance ==
"Mientras Me Curo del Cora" debuted at number 68 on the US Billboard Hot 100 chart dated March 11, 2023. On the US Billboard Hot Latin Songs chart dated March 11, 2023 the song debuted at number 8, becoming Karol G's nineteenth top ten on the chart. On the Billboard Global 200 the song debuted at number 45 on the chart dated March 11, 2023.

== Awards and nominations ==
Awards and nominations for "Mientras Me Curo del Cora"
Year	Ceremony	Category	Result
2023	Heat Latin Music Awards	Best Music Video	Won
2023	Latin Grammy Awards	Record of the Year	Nominated
2023	Latino Music Awards	Best Urban Pop Song	Nominated
2023	Latino Music Awards	Best Urban Pop Video	Won
2024	Latino Music Awards	Best Urban Pop Video	Won
2024	Latino Music Awards	Best Urban Pop Song	Won
2024	Latino Music Awards	Video of the Year	Nominated
2024	Latino Music Awards	Best Viral Song of TikTok	Nominated
2024	Premios Nuestra Tierra	Song of the Year	Won
2024	Premios Nuestra Tierra	Best Pop Song	Won

== Music video ==
The music video for "Mientras Me Curo del Cora" was directed by Pedro Artola, shot in Hawaii and was released on Karol G's YouTube channel on March 7, 2023.

== Live performances ==
The song was first performed at the Viña Del Mar International Song Festival on February 19, 2023, where Karol G performed the first part of the song, teasing it before its release. On March 10, 2023, it was performed in Puerto Rico for a three-day stadium show promoting the release of Mañana Será Bonito. On April 16, 2023, she performed the song on Saturday Night Live. On July 10, 2023, it was performed for the Today morning show. The song was performed by Giraldo on August 4, 2024, for the Lollapalooza music festival. From August 10, 2023, to July 23, 2024, Karol G embarked on the arena-stadium Mañana Será Bonito Tour, where the song was present throughout the set list.

== Charts ==
Weekly chart performance for "Mientras Me Curo del Cora"
Chart (2023)	Peak position
Argentina (Argentina Hot 100)	53
Argentina (Monitor Latino)	10
Bolivia (Monitor Latino)	10
Central America (Monitor Latino)	11
Chile (Billboard)	6
Colombia (Billboard)	3
Colombia (Monitor Latino)	17
Costa Rica (Monitor Latino)	3
Dominican Republic (Monitor Latino)	6
Ecuador (Billboard)	6
Ecuador (Monitor Latino)	15
El Salvador (Monitor Latino)	7
Global 200 (Billboard)	40
Latin America (Monitor Latino)	8
Nicaragua (Monitor Latino)	9
Panama (Monitor Latino)	13
Peru (Billboard)	9
Peru (Monitor Latino)	5
Spain (PROMUSICAE)	23
Uruguay (Monitor Latino)	11
US Billboard Hot 100	68
US Hot Latin Songs (Billboard)	8

== Certifications ==
Certifications for "Mientras Me Curo del Cora"
Region	Certification	Certified units/sales
Brazil (Pro-Música Brasil)	Gold	20,000^{‡}
Canada (Music Canada)	Gold	40,000^{‡}
Spain (Promusicae)	3× Platinum	180,000^{‡}
^{‡} Sales+streaming figures based on certification alone.
