= Mañana Será Bonito =

Studio album by Karol G
- Released: February 24, 2023
- Recorded: 2021–2023
- Genre: Latin pop; reggaeton
- Length: 52:44
- Language: Spanish
- Label: Universal Latino
- Producer: Alejandro Jiménez; Dímelo Flow; DJ Maff; Edgar Barrera; Finneas O'Connell; Jowan; Juan Andrés Ospina; Linda Goldstein; Los Brasileros; Ovy on the Drums; Sech; Tainy; Wain

Karol G chronology
KG0516 (2021)	Mañana Será Bonito (2023)	Mañana Será Bonito (Bichota Season) (2023)

Singles from Mañana Será Bonito
- 1. "Provenza" Released: April 21, 2022; 2. "Gatúbela" Released: August 25, 2022; 3. "Cairo" Released: November 13, 2022; 4. "X Si Volvemos" Released: February 2, 2023; 5. "TQG" Released: February 24, 2023; 6. "Mientras Me Curo del Cora" Released: March 7, 2023; 7. "Amargura" Released: May 19, 2023

Mañana Será Bonito (transl. Tomorrow Will Be Beautiful) is the fourth studio album by Colombian singer Karol G. It was released on February 24, 2023, through Universal Music Latino, being Karol G's last album for the label. Comprising seventeen tracks, the album is primarily a reggaeton and Latin pop record and features guest appearances by Romeo Santos, Quevedo, Shakira, Justin Quiles, Ángel Dior, Maldy, Bad Gyal, Sean Paul, Sech, Ovy on the Drums, and Carla Morrison.

Mañana Será Bonito was supported by seven singles: "Provenza", "Gatúbela" with Maldy, "Cairo" with Ovy on the Drums, "X Si Volvemos" with Romeo Santos, "TQG" with Shakira, "Mientras Me Curo del Cora" and "Amargura". The album was a critical and commercial success and became the first all-Spanish language album by a woman to reach number one on the US Billboard 200, earning 94,000 album-equivalent units in its first week. A companion piece to the album, Mañana Será Bonito (Bichota Season), was released on August 11, 2023.

The recipient of several accolades, Mañana Será Bonito received the Grammy Award for Best Música Urbana Album at the 66th Annual Grammy Awards, becoming her first Grammy Award. The album and its songs also garnered seven nominations at the 24th Annual Latin Grammy Awards, winning three awards, including Album of the Year and Best Urban Music Album.

== Background ==
Following the release of her third studio album in 2021, KG0516, Karol G began releasing collaborative songs with other artists and stand alone singles, such as Tiësto's "Don't Be Shy", her own "Sejodioto" and Becky G's "Mamiii", among others.

On April 19, 2022, Karol G announced the release of "Provenza" through her social media accounts. The song was released on April 21, 2022, as the album's lead single. On September 6, 2022, Karol G embarked on the Strip Love Tour. "Gatúbela", a collaboration with Maldy was released on August 25, 2022, as the following single. On November 13, 2022, "Cairo" with long-time producer Ovy on the Drums was released. On January 25, 2023, Giraldo announced and revealed the title for the album, Mañana Será Bonito, in a video shared through her social media accounts. "X Si Volvemos" with Romeo Santos was released on February 2, 2023.

On February 10, 2023, Giraldo revealed the cover art for the album and revealed the track list, featuring guest appearances from Quevedo, Justin Quiles, Ángel Dior, Bad Gyal, Sean Paul, Sech and Carla Morrison. On February 14, Karol G revealed to The New York Times that Colombian singer Shakira was featured on track 6, "TQG". The song was released as the fifth single alongside the album's release. Mañana Será Bonito was officially released on February 24, 2023.

== Concept ==
The name of the album is a phrase I kept repeating to myself when nothing felt great. Every day I'd say to myself, 'It's okay, tomorrow will be beautiful'.

— Karol G explaining the name of the album.

In an interview with Rolling Stone, Karol G revealed the concept for the title, stating: "This definitely represents a specific phase of my life. The name of album is a phrase I kept repeating to myself when nothing felt great. I mean, I was going through the best moment of my career, but personally I was really disconnected from myself and from my friends. I wasn't unhappy, but I wasn't happy either. So every day I'd say to myself, 'It's okay, mañana será bonito, tomorrow will be beautiful.'"

In a later interview with The New York Times, she described the album as "more Carolina than Karol G". She added: "Right now, I notice that artists are trying very hard to find a concept, to be very experimental, I love that. And that's a good way to do art. But the concept of this album is just me being me. I really didn't want people to feel it was like very simple, or just normal."

== Release and promotion ==
The album was released on February 24, 2023, through Universal Music Latino. It was released on CD, vinyl, digital download and streaming. On April 24, 2022, Karol G performed at the Coachella Valley Music and Arts Festival, where "Provenza" was performed for the very first time. On September 7, 2022, Karol G embarked on the Strip Love Tour, where both "Provenza" and "Gatúbela" were performed. At the 23rd Annual Latin Grammy Awards, held on November 17, 2022, Karol G performed a mash-up of "Provenza", "Gatúbela" and "Cairo", the debut performance for the latter. On February 19, 2023, Karol G was the headlining act for Viña Del Mar International Song Festival. "Provenza", "Gatúbela", "X Si Volvemos" and a short preview for "Mientras Me Curo del Cora" were performed. On March 10, 2023, Karol G performed various songs in Puerto Rico for a three-day show from Mañana Será Bonito for the first time, including the singles "TQG" and "Amargura", among others. On April 15, 2023, Karol G was a musical guest on Saturday Night Live, where "Mientras Me Curo del Cora" and "Tus Gafitas" were performed. On July 10, 2023, on Today morning show, "Amargura", "TQG", "Mientras Me Curo del Cora" and "Tus Gafitas" were performed. Karol G joined the Lollapalooza music festival on August 4, 2023, performing multiple songs from the album. On August 10, 2023, Karol G embarked on the Mañana Será Bonito Tour, promoting Mañana Será Bonito and its companion mixtape, Mañana Será Bonito (Bichota Season). Multiple songs from the album were performed, among others from previous albums. The arena-stadium tour lasted through July 23, 2024, and became the highest-grossing Latin tour of all time by a female artist. On November 19, 2023, Karol G performed a medley of songs, including "Ojos Ferrari" at the Billboard Music Awards.

=== Singles ===
"Provenza" was released on April 21, 2022, as the album's lead single. The song was serviced to contemporary rhythmic radio in the United States on June 7, 2022. The song was a commercial success, becoming at that time the highest peaking full-Spanish song by a female soloist on the US Billboard Hot 100 chart at number 25. The song also reached the top spot US Billboard Hot Latin Songs. It was nominated for Record of the Year and Song of the Year at the 23rd Annual Latin Grammy Awards.

"Gatúbela" with Puerto Rican rapper Maldy was released on August 25, 2022, as the album's second single. It reached the top 40 of the US Billboard Hot 100 chart, at number 37. It also peaked inside the top 5 at number 4 on the US Billboard Hot Latin Songs.

"Cairo" with long-time producer Ovy on the Drums was released on November 13, 2022, as the third single from the album. The song peaked inside the top 15 of the US Billboard Hot Latin Songs. It was awarded triple platinum certification in the United States.

"X Si Volvemos" with American singer Romeo Santos was released on February 2, 2023, as the fourth single from the album. It reached the top 60 of the US Billboard Hot 100 chart, at number 56. It also peaked at number 5 on the US Billboard Hot Latin Songs.

"TQG with Colombian singer Shakira was released alongside the album's release on February 24, 2023. It became Karol G's first number-one single on the Billboard Global 200. It also debuted at number seven on the US Billboard Hot 100, becoming Karol G's first top-ten and highest-charting single. It was nominated for Song of the Year, Best Urban Song and Best Urban Fusion/Performance at the 24th Annual Latin Grammy Awards, winning the latter.

"Mientras Me Curo del Cora" was released as the sixth single on March 7, 2023. It reached the top 70 of the US Billboard Hot 100 chart, at number 68 and peaked at number 8 on the US Billboard Hot Latin Songs. It was nominated for Record of the Year at the 24th Annual Latin Grammy Awards.

"Amargura" was released as the seventh and final single on May 19, 2023. It entered the US Billboard Hot 100 chart, and peaked at number 14 on the US Billboard Hot Latin Songs.

== Critical reception ==
Professional ratings
Aggregate scores
Source	Rating
Metacritic	87/100
Review scores
Source	Rating
AllMusic	4.5/5 stars
The Guardian	4/5 stars
Rolling Stone	4/5 stars
Spin	4/5 stars

Mañana Será Bonito was met with critical acclaim upon release. Giraldo's ability to connect with the listener was praised multiple times. Rolling Stone stated, "Karol's voice is open and warm, blessed with a laid-back purity that is rare in the raucous urbano field. [Like] any global diva worth her salt, Karol engineers the fickle illusion that she's addressing you, the listener, directly — whether evoking unfulfilled desire for a past lover or compiling a list of future erotic delights." The Guardian expanded with "The lyrics are generally of boozy lust and thwarted longing, [but] Karol's skill is in evocative melodies that transcend any language barrier."

Production from Ovy on the Drums was also applauded on the Rolling Stone review, calling him a "digital architect able to inject a sense of purpose into the most tired reggaeton back beat. [It's] nimble and cool, kinetic and futuristic."

== Commercial performance ==
During the first day of release on Spotify, Mañana Será Bonito opened with 32 million streams on the Spotify Global chart and 35.7 million overall, breaking the record for the biggest debut for a Spanish-language album by a woman at that time, previously held by Rosalía's Motomami.

=== United States ===
Mañana Será Bonito debuted at number one on the US Billboard 200 chart, earning 94,000 album-equivalent units in its opening week, of which 10,000 came from pure sales, becoming Giraldo's first number one as well as her first top ten album on the chart. Mañana Será Bonito's tracks collected a total of 118.73 million on-demand audio streams in its first week, representing the largest US streaming week ever for a Latin album by a woman. It became the first all-Spanish-language album by a woman to reach the top spot, and third overall after Bad Bunny's El Último Tour Del Mundo and Un Verano Sin Ti. It also surpassed Shakira's Fijación Oral, Vol. 1 as the all-time highest charting Spanish-language album on the Billboard 200 chart by a female artist. The album also debuted atop the US Top Latin Albums chart, becoming Giraldo's second number one album on the chart, after KG0516.

== Accolades ==
Awards and nominations for Mañana Será Bonito
Year	Ceremony	Category	Result	Ref.
2023	Billboard Music Awards	Top Latin Album	Nominated	
2023	Billboard Latin Music Awards	Top Latin Album of the Year	Won	
2023	Billboard Latin Music Awards	Latin Rhythm Album of the Year	Won	
2023	Latin Grammy Awards	Album of the Year	Won	
2023	Latin Grammy Awards	Best Urban Music Album	Won	
2023	Premios Juventud	Best Urban Album - Female	Won	
2023	Premios Tu Música Urbano	Album of the Year - Female	Won	
2023	Rolling Stone en Español Awards	Album of the Year	Nominated	
2024	Grammy Awards	Best Música Urbana Album	Won	
2024	iHeartRadio Music Awards	Latin Pop/Reggaeton Album of the Year	Won	
2024	Latin American Music Awards	Album of the Year	Won	
2024	Latin American Music Awards	Favorite Urban Album	Won	
2024	People's Choice Awards	The Album of the Year	Nominated	
2024	Premios Lo Nuestro	Album of the Year	Won	
2024	Premios Lo Nuestro	Urban Album of the Year	Won	
2024	Premios Nuestra Tierra	Album of the Year	Won	
2024	Premios Odeón	Latin Album of the Year	Won	

== Track listing ==
Mañana Será Bonito track listing
No.	Title	Writer(s)	Producer(s)	Length
1.	"Mientras Me Curo del Cora"	Carolina Giraldo; Daniel Echavarría; Kevyn Cruz; Robert McFerrin Jr.	Ovy on the Drums; Linda Goldstein; Juan Andrés Ospina	2:44
2.	"X Si Volvemos" (with Romeo Santos)	Giraldo; Anthony Santos; Echavarría; Ernesto Padilla; Josías de la Cruz; Juan Luis Morera; Llandel Veguilla; Cruz	Ovy on the Drums	3:20
3.	"Pero Tú" (with Quevedo)	Giraldo; Echavarría; Pedro Domínguez Quevedo	Ovy on the Drums	3:03
4.	"Besties"	Giraldo; Echavarría; Julio González; Justin Quiles	Ovy on the Drums	2:42
5.	"Gucci los Paños"	Giraldo; Edgar Barrera; Esteban Higuita Estrada; Jorge Alvaro Diaz; Salomón Villada Hoyos	Giraldo; Barrera; Jowan^{[c]}	3:06
6.	"TQG" (with Shakira)	Giraldo; Shakira Mebarak; Echavarría; Cruz	Ovy on the Drums	3:17
7.	"Tus Gafitas"	Giraldo; Echavarría; Finneas O'Connell	Giraldo; Ovy on the Drums; Finneas	2:48
8.	"Ojos Ferrari" (with Justin Quiles and Ángel Dior)	Giraldo; Echavarría; Justin Quiles; Ángel Rosario Dior	Ovy on the Drums	3:00
9.	"Mercurio"	Giraldo; Danilo Valbusa; Estrada; Marcelo de Araujo Ferraz; Pedro Luiz Garcia Caropreso	Wain; Los Brasileros^{[c]}	2:40
10.	"Gatúbela" (with Maldy)	Giraldo; Edwin Vázquez; Justin Quiles; Cristian Salazar; González; Marvin Hawkins	DJ Maff; Giraldo^{[c]}	3:28
11.	"Kármika" (with Bad Gyal and Sean Paul)	Giraldo; Echavarría; Alba Farelo; Sean Paul Henriques; Cruz	Ovy on the Drums	3:56
12.	"Provenza"	Giraldo; Echavarría; Cruz	Ovy on the Drums	3:27
13.	"Carolina"	Giraldo; Echavarría; Cruz; Luis Miguel González Bosé	Ovy on the Drums	2:41
14.	"Dañamos la Amistad" (with Sech)	Giraldo; Carlos Isaías Morales Williams; Jorge Valdés Vázquez	Sech; Dímelo Flow^{[a]}	2:54
15.	"Amargura"	Giraldo; Echavarría; Cruz; Alonso Catalino Curet	Ovy on the Drums	2:50
16.	"Cairo" (with Ovy on the Drums)	Giraldo; Echavarría; Cruz	Ovy on the Drums	3:18
17.	"Mañana Será Bonito" (with Carla Morrison)	Giraldo; Carla Patricia Morrison Flores; Alejandro Jiménez; Marco Masis	Tainy; Jiménez^{[c]}	3:30
Total length:				52:44

Notes

- ^{^[c]} signifies a co-producer
- ^{^[a]} signifies an additional producer

== Personnel ==
- Karol G – vocals
- Dave Kutch – mastering
- Rob Kinelski – mixing
- Eli Heisler – mixing assistance
- Juan Andres Ospina – chorus, engineering, vocal arrangement (track 1)
- Ovy on the Drums – engineering (1), vocals (16)
- Linda Goldstein – vocal arrangement (1)
- Romeo Santos – vocals (2)
- Quevedo – vocals (3)
- Shakira – vocals (6)
- Justin Quiles – vocals (8)
- Ángel Dior – vocals (8)
- Maldy – vocals (10)
- Bad Gyal – vocals (11)
- Sean Paul – vocals (11)
- Sech – vocals (14)
- Carla Morrison – vocals (17)

== Charts ==
=== Weekly charts ===
Weekly chart performance for Mañana Será Bonito
Chart (2023–2024)	Peak position
Belgian Albums (Ultratop Flanders)	83
Belgian Albums (Ultratop Wallonia)	87
Canadian Albums (Billboard)	13
Dutch Albums (Album Top 100)	53
French Albums (SNEP)	55
Italian Albums (FIMI)	30
Portuguese Albums (AFP)	24
Spanish Albums (Promusicae)	1
Swiss Albums (Schweizer Hitparade)	7
US Billboard 200	1
US Top Latin Albums (Billboard)	1
US Latin Rhythm Albums (Billboard)	1

=== Year-end charts ===
Year-end chart performance for Mañana Será Bonito
Chart (2023)	Position
French Albums (SNEP)	175
Spanish Albums (PROMUSICAE)	2
Swiss Albums (Schweizer Hitparade)	65
US Billboard 200	19
US Top Latin Albums (Billboard)	2

2024 year-end chart performance for Mañana Será Bonito
Chart (2024)	Position
Portuguese Albums (AFP)	72
Spanish Albums (PROMUSICAE)	2
Swiss Albums (Schweizer Hitparade)	69
US Billboard 200	78
US Top Latin Albums (Billboard)	5

== Certifications ==
Certifications for Mañana Será Bonito
Region	Certification	Certified units/sales
Brazil (Pro-Música Brasil)	Platinum	40,000^{‡}
Canada (Music Canada)	Platinum	80,000^{‡}
France (SNEP)	Gold	50,000^{‡}
Italy (FIMI)	Gold	25,000^{‡}
Portugal (AFP)	Gold	3,500^{‡}
Spain (Promusicae)	5× Platinum	200,000^{‡}
United States (RIAA)	28× Platinum (Latin)	1,680,000^{‡}
^{‡} Sales+streaming figures based on certification alone.

== Release history ==
Release history and formats for Mañana Será Bonito
Region	Date	Format(s)	Label	Ref.
Various	February 24, 2023	CD; digital download; streaming	Universal Latino	
Various	June 30, 2023	Vinyl LP	Universal Latino	

== See also ==
- 2023 in Latin music
- List of Billboard 200 number-one albums of 2023
- List of number-one Billboard Latin Albums from the 2020s
- List of number-one Billboard Latin Rhythm Albums of 2023
- List of number-one albums of 2023 (Spain)
- List of number-one albums of 2024 (Spain)
