= Ángel Dior =

Dominican rapper

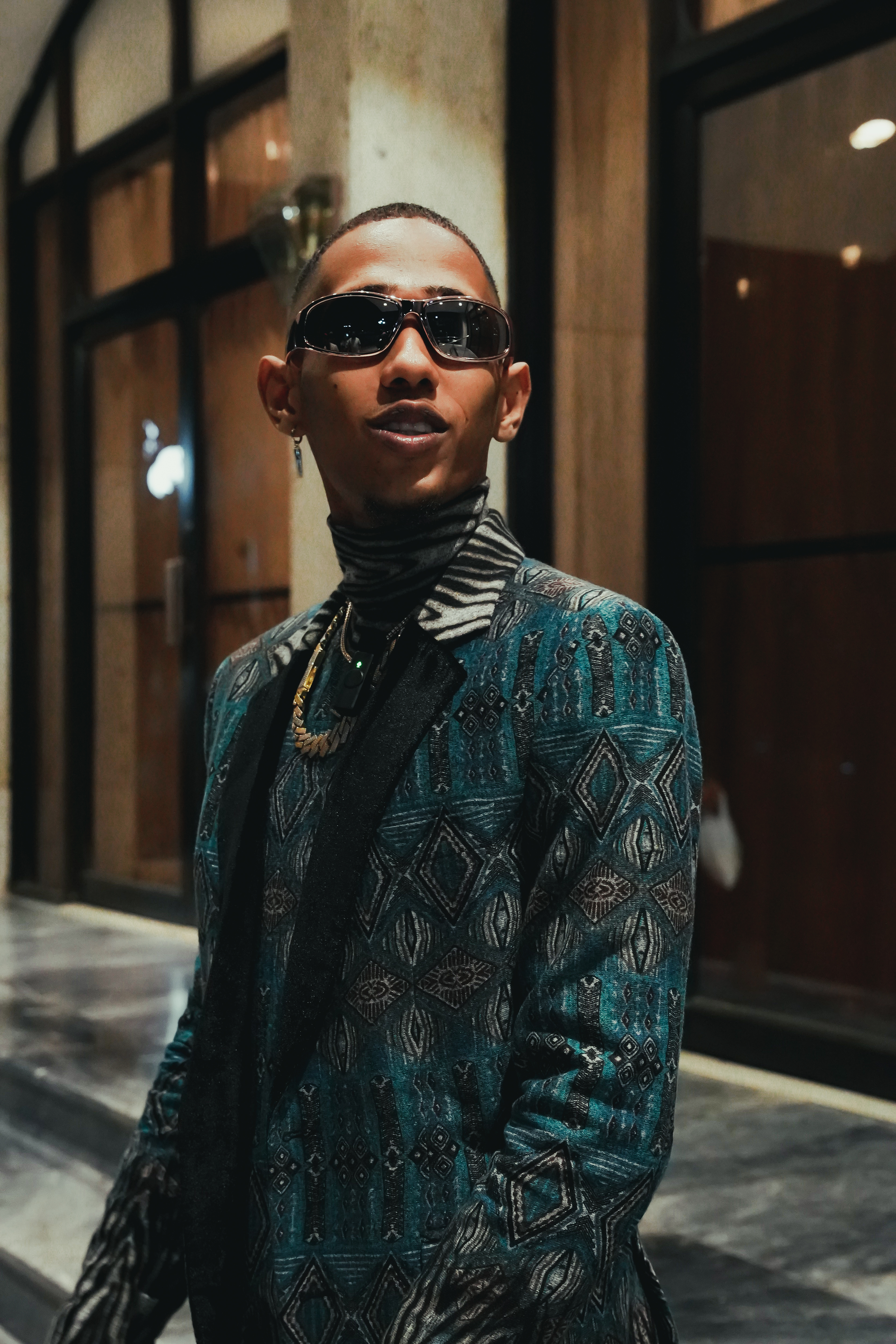
- Dior in 2023

Background information
- Born: Ángel Rosario; 2001 (age 24–25); Santo Domingo, Dominican Republic
- Genres: Dominican dembow; dancehall-pop; Latin trap; reggaeton
- Occupations: Rapper; singer
- Instrument: Vocals
- Label: ONErpm

Ángel Rosario, known by his stage name Ángel Dior, is a Dominican rapper and singer. Rosario was born in 2001, Santo Domingo, Dominican Republic. He was awarded in the Heat Latin Music Awards and Premios Juventud in the categories; Best Dominican Urban Artist, and Best Dembow Collaboration. He has collaborated with Rauw Alejandro, Karol G, 6ix9ine, El Alfa, Chimbala and Bad Bunny.

== Career ==
In September 2022, Rosario debuted with the single “A I O”, obtained more than 40 million views on YouTube. Spanish singer Rosalía and American rapper Cardi B, included “A I O” in their presentations during the Louis Vuitton fashion show, and MTV Music, being sung along with Bad Bunny and Rosario at the Félix Sánchez Olympic Stadium. In October of the same year, he released his debut single "Piropi".

In 2023, Rosario participated in the fourth studio album Mañana Será Bonito by Colombian singer Karol G, in the song "Ojos Ferrari", in collaboration with Justin Quiles. In that same year he participated in the single "Tamo en nota" in collaboration with the Puerto Rican singer Rauw Alejandro. In April 2023, he was featured in the song ''Wapae'' in collaboration with 6ix9ine, Lenier, and Bulin 47.

== Awards and nominations ==
In 2023 Rosario obtained nominations at Premios Juventud in the categories: Best Dembow Song, Best Dembow Collaboration. In 2023 Rosario was nominated in the Heat Latin Music Awards, for the Musical Promise category.
