= Provenza (song) =

2022 single by Karol G

Single by Karol G

from the album Mañana Será Bonito
- Language: Spanish
- Released: April 21, 2022
- Genre: Latin pop; afrobeats; reggaeton
- Length: 3:30
- Label: Universal Latino
- Songwriters: Carolina Giraldo; Daniel Echavarria; Kevyn Cruz
- Producer: Ovy on the Drums

Karol G singles chronology
| "Un Viaje" (2022) | "Provenza" (2022) | "Gatúbela" (2022) |

"Provenza" (stylized in all caps) is a song by Colombian singer-songwriter Karol G. It was written by Karol G, Keityn and Ovy on the Drums, and produced by the latter. The song was released on April 21, 2022, through Universal Music Latino, as the lead single from her fourth studio album, Mañana Será Bonito (2023).

== Background ==
The song was announced two days prior to its release on April 19, 2022, through Karol G's social media platforms. The song was released on April 21, 2022.

== Composition ==
Produced by Ovy on the Drums, "Provenza" is a song that fuses the tropical rhythms of afrobeats and reggaeton. Is written in the key of D♭ major, with a moderately fast tempo of 111 beats per minute.

== Critical reception ==
Jessica Roiz from Billboard stated: "From its feel-good melody to its lyrics full of fresh air and freedom, the lilting, calypso-esque dance beat is a whole vibe."

== Commercial performance ==
"Provenza" debuted at number 36 on the US Billboard Hot 100 chart dated May 7, 2022. It became the highest debut for a Spanish song by a female artist on the chart's history. The following week the song reached its peak at number 25 on the chart dated May 14, 2022. The song became the highest charting Spanish song by a female soloist on the Billboard Hot 100 chart history, later surpassed by Giraldo herself with "Mi Ex Tenía Razón".

On the US Billboard Hot Latin Songs chart dated May 7, 2022 the song debuted at number 2, becoming Giraldo's highest peaking song as a soloist on the chart. The following week the song reached the top spot on the chart dated May 14, 2022, becoming her first number 1 song as a soloist on the chart and fifth overall.

On the Billboard Global 200 the song debuted at number 15 on the chart dated May 7, 2022. The following week the song reached its peak at number 6. At the time it became Giraldo's highest peaking solo song.

According to the International Federation of the Phonographic Industry (IFPI), it was the twentieth best-selling global single of 2022, earning 920 million subscription streams equivalents globally

== Awards and nominations ==
Awards and nominations for "Provenza"
| Year | Ceremony | Category | Result |
|---|---|---|---|
| 2022 | American Music Awards | Favorite Latin Song | Nominated |
| 2022 | Billboard Latin Music Awards | Latin Pop Song of the Year | Nominated |
| 2022 | Latin Grammy Awards | Record of the Year | Nominated |
| 2022 | Latin Grammy Awards | Song of the Year | Nominated |
| 2022 | Los 40 Music Awards | Best Latin Song | Nominated |
| 2022 | Los 40 Music Awards | Best Latin Video | Nominated |
| 2022 | Musa Sprite Awards | International Latin Song of the Year | Nominated |
| 2022 | Premios Juventud | Catchiest Song | Won |
| 2022 | Premios Quiero | Best Urban Video | Nominated |
| 2022 | WME Awards | Latin Song | Nominated |
| 2023 | Heat Latin Music Awards | Song of the Year | Won |
| 2023 | iHeartRadio Music Awards | Latin Pop/Reggaeton Song of the Year | Nominated |
| 2023 | Latin American Music Awards | Favorite Pop Song | Won |
| 2023 | Premios Lo Nuestro Awards | Urban Song of the Year | Won |
| 2023 | Premios Nuestra Tierra | Song of the Year | Nominated |
| 2023 | Premios Tu Música Urbano | Song of the Year | Won |
| 2023 | Rolling Stone en Español Awards | Song of the Year | Nominated |
| 2023 | Rolling Stone en Español Awards | Music Video of the Year | Nominated |
| 2023 | Spotify Plaques | One Billion Streams Award | Won |
| 2024 | BMI Latin Awards | Award Winning Song | Won |

== Music video ==
The music video for "Provenza" was directed by Pedro Artola and was released on Karol G's YouTube channel on April 21, 2022. The music video takes place throughout the island of Lanzarote.

== Live performances ==
Giraldo performed the song live for the first time at the Coachella Valley Music and Arts Festival on April 24, 2022 and second time on April 25, 2022. On September 7, 2022, Karol G embarked on the Strip Love Tour, where "Provenza" present during the whole tour set list. At the 23rd Annual Latin Grammy Awards, held on November 17, 2022, Karol G performed a mash-up of "Provenza", "Gatúbela" and "Cairo". On February 19, 2023, Karol G was the headlining act for Viña Del Mar International Song Festival, where "Provenza" was performed. On March 10, 2023, Karol G performed "Provenza" in Puerto Rico for a three-day stadium-show to promote the album Mañana Será Bonito. From August 10, 2023, to July 23, 2024, Karol G embarked on the arena-stadium Mañana Será Bonito Tour, where "Provenza" was present throughout the set list.

== Charts ==
=== Weekly charts ===
Weekly chart performance for "Provenza"
| Chart (2022 - 2023) | Peak position |
|---|---|
| Argentina Hot 100 (Billboard) | 4 |
| Argentina (Monitor Latino) | 1 |
| Bolivia (Billboard) | 1 |
| Bolivia (Monitor Latino) | 2 |
| Central America (Monitor Latino) | 1 |
| Chile (Billboard) | 1 |
| Chile (Monitor Latino) | 3 |
| Colombia (Billboard) | 1 |
| Colombia (Promúsica) | 1 |
| Colombia (Monitor Latino) | 1 |
| Costa Rica (FONOTICA) | 1 |
| Costa Rica (Monitor Latino) | 1 |
| Dominican Republic (Monitor Latino) | 1 |
| Dominican Republic (SODINPRO) | 1 |
| Ecuador (Billboard) | 1 |
| Ecuador (Monitor Latino) | 1 |
| El Salvador (Monitor Latino) | 2 |
| Global 200 (Billboard) | 6 |
| Guatemala (Monitor Latino) | 1 |
| Honduras (Monitor Latino) | 1 |
| Latin America (Monitor Latino) | 1 |
| Mexico (Billboard) | 1 |
| Mexico (Billboard Mexican Espanol Airplay) | 3 |
| Mexico (Billboard Mexican Airplay) | 10 |
| Mexico Streaming (AMPROFON) | 1 |
| Mexico (Monitor Latino) | 4 |
| Nicaragua (Monitor Latino) | 1 |
| Panama (Monitor Latino) | 1 |
| Panama (PRODUCE) | 1 |
| Paraguay (Monitor Latino) | 1 |
| Peru (Billboard) | 1 |
| Peru (Monitor Latino) | 1 |
| Portugal (AFP) | 28 |
| Puerto Rico (Monitor Latino) | 5 |
| Spain (PROMUSICAE) | 2 |
| Switzerland (Schweizer Hitparade) | 62 |
| Uruguay (Monitor Latino) | 1 |
| US Billboard Hot 100 | 25 |
| US Hot Latin Songs (Billboard) | 1 |
| US Latin Airplay (Billboard) | 1 |
| US Latin Pop Airplay (Billboard) | 1 |
| US Rhythmic Airplay (Billboard) | 23 |
| Venezuela (Monitor Latino) | 8 |
| Venezuela (Record Report) | 35 |

=== Monthly charts ===
Monthly chart performance for "Provenza"
| Chart (2022) | Peak position |
|---|---|
| Paraguay (SGP) | 1 |
| Uruguay (CUD) | 7 |

=== Year-end charts ===
2022 year-end chart performance for "Provenza"
| Chart (2022) | Position |
|---|---|
| Argentina (Monitor Latino) | 19 |
| Bolivia (Monitor Latino) | 3 |
| Chile (Monitor Latino) | 3 |
| Colombia (Monitor Latino) | 1 |
| Costa Rica (Monitor Latino) | 1 |
| Dominican Republic (Monitor Latino) | 1 |
| Ecuador (Monitor Latino) | 3 |
| El Salvador (Monitor Latino) | 8 |
| Global 200 (Billboard) | 32 |
| Guatemala (Monitor Latino) | 1 |
| Honduras (Monitor Latino) | 1 |
| Latin America (Monitor Latino) | 1 |
| Mexico (Monitor Latino) | 9 |
| Nicaragua (Monitor Latino) | 5 |
| Panama (Monitor Latino) | 2 |
| Paraguay (Monitor Latino) | 4 |
| Peru (Monitor Latino) | 5 |
| Puerto Rico (Monitor Latino) | 10 |
| Spain (PROMUSICAE) | 13 |
| Uruguay (Monitor Latino) | 5 |
| Uruguay (CUD) | 16 |
| US Billboard Hot 100 | 63 |
| US Hot Latin Songs (Billboard) | 5 |
| US Latin Pop Airplay (Billboard) | 2 |
| US Latin Airplay (Billboard) | 2 |
| Venezuela (Monitor Latino) | 7 |

2023 year-end chart performance for "Provenza"
| Chart (2023) | Position |
|---|---|
| Bolivia (Monitor Latino) | 71 |
| Central America (Monitor Latino) | 30 |
| Chile (Monitor Latino) | 23 |
| Colombia (Monitor Latino) | 31 |
| Costa Rica (Monitor Latino) | 44 |
| Dominican Republic (Monitor Latino) | 93 |
| Ecuador (Monitor Latino) | 25 |
| El Salvador (Monitor Latino) | 68 |
| Global 200 (Billboard) | 121 |
| Guatemala (Monitor Latino) | 35 |
| Honduras (Monitor Latino) | 50 |
| Latin America (Monitor Latino) | 35 |
| Nicaragua (Monitor Latino) | 39 |
| Panama (Monitor Latino) | 17 |
| Paraguay (Monitor Latino) | 41 |
| Peru (Monitor Latino) | 62 |
| Spain (PROMUSICAE) | 63 |
| US Hot Latin Songs (Billboard) | 85 |
| US Latin Pop Airplay (Billboard) | 3 |

2024 year-end chart performance for "Provenza"
| Chart (2024) | Position |
|---|---|
| Chile (Monitor Latino) | 69 |
| Costa Rica (Monitor Latino) | 89 |
| Ecuador (Monitor Latino) | 72 |
| Panama (Monitor Latino) | 58 |
| Peru (Monitor Latino) | 92 |
| Spain (PROMUSICAE) | 77 |

== Certifications and sales ==
Certifications and sales for "Provenza"
| Region | Certification | Certified units/sales |
|---|---|---|
| Argentina (CAPIF) | Platinum | 20,000^{*} |
| Brazil (Pro-Música Brasil) | 2× Platinum | 80,000^{‡} |
| Canada (Music Canada) | 2× Platinum | 160,000^{‡} |
| France (SNEP) | Gold | 100,000^{‡} |
| Italy (FIMI) | Gold | 50,000^{‡} |
| Portugal (AFP) | Platinum | 10,000^{‡} |
| Spain (Promusicae) | 9× Platinum | 540,000^{‡} |
| United States (RIAA) | 36× Platinum (Latin) | 2,160,000^{‡} |
Streaming
| Central America (CFC) | Platinum | 7,000,000^{†} |
| Worldwide | — | 920,000,000 |
^{*} Sales figures based on certification alone.^{‡} Sales+streaming figures based on certification alone.^{†} Streaming-only figures based on certification alone.

== Release history ==
Release history for "Provenza"
| Region | Date | Format | Label(s) | Ref. |
|---|---|---|---|---|
| Various | April 21, 2022 | Digital download; streaming | Universal Latino | |
| United States | June 7, 2022 | Rhythmic radio | Universal Latino | |

== "Provenza (Remix)" ==
"Provenza (Remix)"

Song by Karol G and Tiësto

from the album Mañana Será Bonito (Bichota Season)
- Language: Spanish
- Released: August 11, 2023
- Length: 3:08
- Label: Universal Latino
- Songwriters: Carolina Giraldo; Daniel Echavarria; Kevyn Cruz
- Producers: Ovy on the Drums; Tiësto

A Tiësto remix version of "Provenza" was released on August 11, 2023, as part of Karol G's second mixtape, Mañana Será Bonito (Bichota Season).

=== Background ===
"Provenza (Remix)" was teased for the first time on the electronic dance music festival Tomorrowland on July 29, 2022, where Karol G performed the song with Tiësto as a surprise appearance. On February 19, 2023, Giraldo was the headlining act for Viña Del Mar International Song Festival, where the song was performed for the second time.

On July 31, 2023, Mañana Será Bonito (Bichota Season) was announced. On August 7, 2023, Giraldo revealed the track list, where "Provenza (Remix)" was featured. The song was released on August 11, 2023, alongside the mixtape's release.

=== Charts ===
Weekly chart performance for "Provenza (Remix)"
| Chart (2023) | Peak position |
|---|---|
| US Hot Dance/Electronic Songs (Billboard) | 4 |
| US Hot Latin Songs (Billboard) | 36 |

== See also ==
- List of Billboard Argentina Hot 100 top-ten singles in 2022
- List of Billboard Global 200 top 10 singles of 2022
- List of Billboard Hot Latin Songs and Latin Airplay number ones of 2022
- List of Billboard Latin Pop Airplay number ones of 2022
- List of best-selling singles in Spain
- List of best-selling Latin singles
- Billboard Year-End Hot 100 singles of 2022
