= List of best-selling singles in Mexico =

This is a list of best-selling singles in Mexico, divided into the singles with the most certified units by the Asociación Mexicana de Productores de Fonogramas y Videogramas (AMPROFON), and the singles with the most claimed sales.

== Best-selling singles by AMPROFON (1999 to present) ==
=== 2 million or more units ===
Year	Artist(s)	Title	Certified units/sales	Certification
2019	Karol G, Nicki Minaj	"Tusa"	6,510,000	21× Diamond+3× Platinum+Gold
2020	Karol G	"Bichota"	6,480,000	21× Diamond+3× Platinum
2021	Kali Uchis	"Telepatía"	3,500,000	5× Diamond
2019	Daddy Yankee	"Con Calma"	3,360,000	11× Diamond+Platinum
2012	León Larregui	"Brillas"	2,910,000	9× Diamond+3× Platinum+Gold
2020	Karol G	"Ay, Dios Mio!"	2,790,000	9× Diamond+Platinum+Gold
2016	DJ Snake, Justin Bieber	"Let Me Love You"	2,700,000	9× Diamond
2021	Imagine Dragons, JID	"Enemy"	2,310,000	3× Diamond+Platinum+Gold
2023	Miley Cyrus	"Flowers"	2,310,000	3× Diamond+Platinum+Gold
2014	J Balvin	"Ay Vamos"	2,280,000	7× Diamond+3× Platinum
2015	J Balvin	"Ginza"	2,070,000	6× Diamond+4× Platinum+Gold

=== 1 million to 1.9 million units ===
Year	Artist(s)	Title	Certified units/sales	Certification
2021	Karol G, Mariah Angeliq	"El Makinon"	1,960,000	2× Diamond+4× Platinum
2013	Enrique Iglesias, Marco Antonio Solís	"El Perdedor"	1,860,000	6× Diamond+Platinum
2017	Luis Fonsi, Daddy Yankee, Justin Bieber	"Despacito (remix)"	1,770,000	5× Diamond+4× Platinum+Gold
2014	Enrique Iglesias, Sean Paul, Descemer Bueno, Gente de Zona	"Bailando"	1,710,000	5× Diamond+3× Platinum+Gold
2022	Yuridia and Angela Aguilar	"Qué Agonía"	1,540,000	2× Diamond + Platinum
2015	Natalia Lafourcade	"Hasta la Raíz"	1,470,000	4× Diamond+4× Platinum+Gold
2018	Danna Paola	"Mala Fama"	1,410,000	4× Diamond+3× Platinum+Gold
2021	Justin Bieber, Daniel Caesar, Giveon	"Peaches"	1,400,000	2× Diamond
2016	León Larregui	"Locos"	1,380,000	4× Diamond+3× Platinum
2016	Reik	“Ya Me Enteré”	1,350,000	4x Diamond+2x Platinum+Gold
2020	Maluma	"Hawái"	1,290,000	4× Diamond+Platinum+Gold
2021	J Balvin and María Becerra	"Qué más pues?"	1,260,000	Diamond+4× Platinum
2021	Rauw Alejandro	"Todo de Ti"	1,260,000	Diamond+Gold
2020	Olivia Rodrigo	"Drivers License"	1,260,000	Diamond+4× Platinum
1983	Michael Jackson	"Billie Jean"	1,200,000	4× Diamond
2020	Feid, Justin Quiles, J Balvin, Nicky Jam, Maluma, Sech	"Porfa (Remix)"	1,200,000	4× Diamond
1997	Shakira	"Antología"	1,170,000	3×Diamond+4×Platinum+Gold
2022	Danny Ocean	"Fuera Del Mercado"	1,050,000	Diamond+2× Platinum+Gold
2022	Kali Uchis	"Igual que un Ángel"	1,050,000	Diamond+2× Platinum+Gold
2020	Olivia Rodrigo	"Deja Vu"	1,050,000	Diamond+2× Platinum+Gold

=== Over 600,000 units ===
Year	Artist(s)	Title	Certified units/sales	Certification
2021	Olivia Rodrigo	"Good 4 U"	980,000	Diamond+2× Platinum
2021	Olivia Rodrigo	"Traitor"	980,000	Diamond+2× Platinum
2022	Becky G and Karol G	"Mamiii"	980,000	Diamond+2× Platinum
2017	The Chainsmokers and Coldplay	"Something Just Like This"	960,000	3× Diamond+Platinum
2021	Gera MX, Christian Nodal	"Botella Tras Botella"	910,000	Diamond+Platinum+Gold
2021	Sebastián Yatra, Myke Towers	"Pareja del Año"	910,000	Diamond+Platinum+Gold
2021	Karol G, Anuel AA, J Balvin	"Location"	910,000	Diamond+Platinum+Gold
2021	Acraze, Cherish	"Do It to It"	910,000	Diamond+Platinum+Gold
2019	Karol G	"Ocean"	870,000	2× Diamond+4× Platinum+Gold
1983	Michael Jackson	"Beat It"	840,000	2× Diamond+4× Platinum
2022	Shakira and Rauw Alejandro	"Te Felicito"	840,000	Diamond + Platinum
2022	Rosalía	"Despechá"	840,000	Diamond + Platinum
2023	Bizarrap and Shakira	"Shakira: Bzrp Music Sessions, Vol. 53"	840,000	Diamond + Platinum
2016	Billie Eilish	"Ocean Eyes"	840,000	2× Diamond+4× Platinum
2015	Maluma	"Borró Cassette"	840,000	2× Diamond+4× Platinum
2021	Natanael Cano, Óscar Maydon	"Porte Exuberante"	770,000	Diamond+Gold
1990	AC/DC	"Thunderstruck"	720,000	2× Diamond+2× Platinum
2019	Maluma	"11 PM"	720,000	2× Diamond+2× Platinum
2020	Christian Nodal, Ángela Aguilar	"Dime Cómo Quieres"	700,000	Diamond
2022	Imagine Dragons	"Bones"	700,000	Diamond
2022	Junior H, Luis R. Conriquez	"Los Botones Azules"	700,000	Diamond
2016	Carlos Vives and Shakira	"La Bicicleta"	690,000	2× Diamond+Platinum+ Gold
2020	Black Eyed Peas and Shakira	"Girl Like Me"	630,000	4× Platinum+Gold
2021	Anitta	"Envolver"	630,000	4× Platinum+Gold
2022	Harry Styles	"As It Was"	630,000	4× Platinum+Gold
2017	Yuridia	"Amigos No Por Favor"	630,000	2× Diamond+Gold
2019	Maluma	"HP"	630,000	2× Diamond+Gold
2016	Shakira and Maluma	"Chantaje"	600,000	2× Diamond
2014	Sia	"Chandelier"	600,000	2× Diamond

== By claimed sales ==
Year	Artist	Title	Sales	Ref.
1950	Pedro Infante	"Las Mañanitas"	15,000,000	
1957	Julio Jaramillo	"Nuestro Juramento"	2,000,000	
1984	Juan Gabriel	"Querida"	2,000,000	
c. 1940s	José Barros	"El Gallo Tuerto"	1,000,000	
1954	Vicente Garrido Calderón	"No me platiques más"	1,000,000	
1973	Angélica María	"Tú sigues siendo el mismo"	1,000,000	
1978	Boney M.	"Rivers of Babylon"	1,000,000	
1979	Lipps Inc.	"Rock It"	1,000,000	
1980	Lipps Inc.	"Funkytown"	1,000,000	
1980	Lipps Inc.	"How Long"	1,000,000	
1983	José José	"Lo Dudo"	1,000,000	
1981	Yuri	"El Pequeño Panda de Chapultepec"	800,000	
1989	Kaoma	"Lambada"	750,000	
1979	ABBA	"Chiquitita"	500,000	
	Ángela Carrasco	"Quererte a Ti"	500,000	

== See also ==
- List of best-selling albums in Mexico
- List of best-selling singles by country
- Asociación Mexicana de Productores de Fonogramas y Videogramas
