= Mamiii =

Single by Becky G and Karol G

from the album Esquemas
- Language: Spanish
- Released: February 10, 2022
- Genre: Reggaeton
- Length: 3:47
- Label: Kemosabe; RCA
- Composers: Daniel Echavarría Oviedo; Justin Quiles; Luis Miguel Gomez Castaño; Daniel Uribe
- Lyricists: Rebbeca Marie Gomez; Elena Rose; Carolina Giraldo Navarro
- Producer: Ovy on the Drums

Becky G singles chronology
"Bella Ciao" (2021)	"Mamiii" (2022)	"Ya Acabó" (2022)

Karol G singles chronology
"Friki" (2021)	"Mamiii" (2022)	"Un Viaje" (2022)

Music video
- "MAMIII" on YouTube

"Mamiii" is a song recorded by American singer Becky G and Colombian singer Karol G. It was released by Kemosabe and RCA Records on February 10, 2022, as the third single from Gomez's second Spanish studio album Esquemas (2022). It was written by Gomez, Giraldo, Elena Rose and Daniel Echavarría Oviedo and produced by the latter. The cover art was shot by photographer Alfredo Flores. It is Gomez and Giraldo's second collaboration, following "Mi Mala (Remix)" released in February 2018. The single reached number one on the Hot Latin Songs, peaked at number four on the Global 200, and peaked at number fifteen on the Billboard Hot 100.

== Commercial performance ==
The song reached a peak of number 15 on the US Billboard Hot 100, earning both artists their second top 40 in the nation, as well as Gomez's highest-charting single on the chart.

== Music video ==
The original music video for the song was filmed in January 2022 in an unknown desert. It was scrapped due to creative differences according to Gomez. A second and official music video was directed by Mike Ho and released on April 15, 2022. It stars Angus Cloud and Mia Khalifa. Gomez and Giraldo do not appear in the music video.

== Live performances ==
Gomez and Giraldo performed the song together live for the first time at the Coachella 2022 on April 17 and 24, 2022. The song was also featured on the set list of Bichota Tour. On May 15, Gomez performed "Mamiii" on the 2022 Billboard Music Awards, along with "Bailé Con Mi Ex". Gomez and Giraldo performed the song together live at the Strip Love Tour in Los Angeles on October 22. Gomez performed the song on Premios de la Radio on November 3. Gomez performed "Mamiii" on Billboard Women in Music on March 1, 2023. Gomez performed the song at the Coachella 2023 on April 14 and 21. The song was featured on the set list of Giraldo's Mañana Será Bonito Tour. On August 18, Gomez and Giraldo performed the song together during the tour's stop in Pasadena (Note: Promoted as Los Angeles.), and again on December 1 in Medellín. It was part of the set list of Gomez' Mi Casa, Tu Casa Tour. The song was performed at Giraldo's Viajando Por El Mundo Tour, during the dates in which Gomez was an opener.

== Critical reception ==
Publication	List	Rank	Ref.
Billboard	Billboard's 100 Best Songs	56	
Billboard	Best Latin Songs	—N/a	
Billboard	The 23 Best Latin Songs	—N/a	
¡Hola!	15 Latin Hits That Made Us Dance and Sing	—N/a	
Latina	Top 20 Songs	8	
Los Angeles Times	The 100 Best Songs	26	
Rolling Stone	100 Greatest Reggaeton Songs of All Time	65	
Tidal	Best Songs	24	
Time	The Best Latin Songs and Albums	—N/a	
UPROXX	The Best Songs	—N/a	

== Accolades ==
Awards and nominations for "Mamiii"
Organization	Year	Category	Result	Ref.
American Music Awards	2022	Favorite Latin Song	Nominated	
ASCAP Latin Music Awards	2023	Winning Songwriters & Publishers (Note: Awards and nominations Gomez, CASTA and Daniel Uribe has received as songwriter.)	Won	
Billboard Latin Music Awards	2022	Hot Latin Song of the Year	Nominated	
Billboard Latin Music Awards	2022	Hot Latin Song of the Year – Vocal Event	Won	
Billboard Latin Music Awards	2022	Airplay Song of the Year	Nominated	
Billboard Latin Music Awards	2022	Latin Rhythm Song of the Year	Nominated	
Billboard Latin Music Awards	2022	Latin Pop Song of the Year	Nominated	
BMI Latin Awards	2023	Winning Songs (Note: Awards and nominations Giraldo, Ovy On The Drums, Quiles and Rose has received as songwriter.)	Won	
BreakTudo Awards	2022	Latin Hit of the Year	Nominated	
iHeartRadio Music Awards	2023	Latin Pop/Reggaeton Song of the Year	Won	
Latin American Music Awards	2023	Song of the Year	Won	
Latin American Music Awards	2023	Collaboration of the Year	Won	
Latin American Music Awards	2023	Best Collaboration – Pop/Urban	Won	
Latin Grammy Awards	2022	Best Urban Song	Nominated	
Latino Show Awards	2022	Song of the Year	Won	
Latino Show Awards	2022	Best Urban Videoclip of the Year	Won	
Latino Show Awards	2022	Best Urban Song of the Year	Won	
Latino Show Awards	2022	Best Urban Music producer (Note: Awards and nominations Ovy On The Drums has received as producer.)	Won	
Lo Nuestro Awards	2023	Song of the Year	Won	
Lo Nuestro Awards	2023	Urban/Pop Song of the Year	Nominated	
LOS40 Music Awards	2022	Best Video	Nominated	
MTV Millennial Awards	2022	Viral Anthem	Won	
MTV Video Music Awards	2022	Best Latin	Nominated	
Monitor Latino Music Awards	2022	Best Urban Song	Nominated	
Premios Juventud	2022	Girl Power	Won	
Premios Juventud	2022	Viral Track of the Year	Nominated	
Premios Lo Mas Escuchado	2022	Collaboration of the Year	Won	
Premios Nuestra Tierra	2023	Best Urban Song of the Year	Nominated	
Premios Tu Música Urbano	2022	Collaboration of the Year	Won	
RIAA Gold & Platinum Awards	2022	Top Latin Single	Won	
Spotify Plaques	2024	One Billion Streams Award	Won	

== Track listings ==
No.	Title	Length
1.	"Mamiii"	3:47

Digital download
No.	Title	Length
1.	"Mamiii" (kryptogram Remix)	3:29

== Charts ==
=== Weekly charts ===
Weekly chart performance for "Mamiii"
Chart (2022–2023)	Peak position
Argentina Hot 100 (Billboard)	9
Bolivia (Billboard)	1
Chile (Billboard)	1
Colombia (Billboard)	1
Costa Rica (Monitor Latino)	1
Dominican Republic (Monitor Latino)	1
Ecuador (Billboard)	1
El Salvador (Monitor Latino)	1
Global 200 (Billboard)	4
Global Excl. US (Billboard)	5
Guatemala (Monitor Latino)	1
Honduras (Monitor Latino)	1
Mexico (Billboard)	1
Mexico (Billboard Mexican Airplay)	9
Mexico (Billboard Mexican Espanol Airplay)	4
Netherlands (Single Tip)	17
Nicaragua (Monitor Latino)	1
Panama (Monitor Latino)	1
Paraguay (Monitor Latino)	1
Peru (Billboard)	1
Peru (UNIMPRO)	1
Portugal (AFP)	43
Puerto Rico (Monitor Latino)	7
Romania Airplay (Media Forest)	5
Romania TV Airplay (Media Forest)	8
Spain (Billboard)	2
Spain (Promusicae)	1
Spain Airplay (TopHit)	90
Switzerland (Schweizer Hitparade)	36
Uruguay (Monitor Latino)	2
US Billboard Hot 100	15
US Hot Latin Songs (Billboard)	1
US Latin Airplay (Billboard)	1
US Latin Rhythm Airplay (Billboard)	1
US Pop Airplay (Billboard)	26
US Rhythmic Airplay (Billboard)	12
Venezuela Airplay (Monitor Latino)	8

=== Monthly charts ===
Monthly chart performance for "Mamiii"
Chart (2022)	Peak position
Paraguay (SGP)	1
Uruguay (CUD)	4

=== Year-end charts ===
2022 year-end chart performance for "Mamiii"
Chart (2022)	Position
Argentina (Monitor Latino)	17
Bolivia (Monitor Latino)	2
Chile (Monitor Latino)	10
Colombia (Monitor Latino)	2
Costa Rica Urbano (Monitor Latino)	1
Dominican Republic (Monitor Latino)	2
Ecuador (Monitor Latino)	4
El Salvador (Monitor Latino)	2
Global 200 (Billboard)	36
Guatemala (Monitor Latino)	1
Honduras (Monitor Latino)	2
Latin America (Monitor Latino)	2
Nicaragua (Monitor Latino)	2
Panama (Monitor Latino)	3
Paraguay (Monitor Latino)	5
Peru (Monitor Latino)	1
Spain (PROMUSICAE)	11
Switzerland (Schweizer Hitparade)	88
Uruguay (Monitor Latino)	8
US Billboard Hot 100	59
US Hot Latin Songs (Billboard)	4
US Rhythmic (Billboard)	46
US Latin Pop Airplay Songs (Billboard)	1
US Latin Rhythm Airplay (Billboard)	1
US Latin Airplay Songs (Billboard)	1
US Latin Digital Song Sales (Billboard)	2
US Latin Streaming Songs (Billboard)	5

2023 year-end chart performance for "Mamiii"
Chart (2023)	Position
US Latin Pop Airplay (Billboard)	9
US Latin Rhythm Airplay (Billboard)	29

== Certifications ==
Certifications for "Mamiii"
Region	Certification	Certified units/sales
Brazil (Pro-Música Brasil)	Platinum	40,000^{‡}
France (SNEP)	Gold	100,000^{‡}
Italy (FIMI)	Gold	50,000^{‡}
Mexico (AMPROFON)	Diamond+3× Platinum+Gold	1,190,000^{‡}
Portugal (AFP)	Gold	5,000^{‡}
Spain (Promusicae)	7× Platinum	420,000^{‡}
Switzerland (IFPI Switzerland)	Gold	10,000^{‡}
United States (RIAA)	23× Platinum (Latin)	1,380,000^{‡}
Streaming
Central America (CFC)	Platinum	7,000,000^{†}
^{‡} Sales+streaming figures based on certification alone.^{†} Streaming-only figures based on certification alone.

== Release history ==
Release dates and formats for "Mamiii"
Region	Date	Format	Version	Label	Ref.
Various	February 10, 2022	Digital download; streaming	Original	Kemosabe; RCA	
Italy	February 18, 2022	Contemporary hit radio	Original	Sony Latin	
Various	May 12, 2022	Digital download	kryptogram Remix	Kemosabe; RCA	
Russia	May 14, 2022	Contemporary hit radio	Original	Kemosabe; RCA	

== See also ==
- List of Billboard Hot Latin Songs and Latin Airplay number ones of 2022
- List of number-one singles of 2022 (Spain)
- List of best-selling singles in Spain
- List of best-selling singles in Mexico
- Billboard Year-End Hot 100 singles of 2022
- List of Billboard Argentina Hot 100 top-ten singles in 2022
