= Strip Love Tour =

2022 concert tour by Karol G

- Tour by Karol G
- Location: North America
- Associated album: KG0516
- Start date: September 6, 2022
- End date: November 2, 2022
- Legs: 1
- No. of shows: 33
- Supporting act: Agudelo
- Attendance: 412,840 (33 Shows)
- Box office: $72.2 million

Karol G concert chronology
- Bichota Tour (2021–2022); Strip Love Tour (2022); Mañana Será Bonito Tour (2023–2024)

The Strip Love Tour (stylized as $trip Love Tour) was the third concert tour by Colombian singer Karol G, in support of her third studio album, KG0516 (2021). It started on September 6, 2022, in Rosemont, Illinois, and concluded on November 2, 2022 in Boston, United States. Sponsored by AEG Live, the tour visited indoor arenas across the United States and Canada.

== Set list ==
This set list is representative of the show on September 20, 2022, in Charlotte. It is not representative of all the concerts of the tour.

Act I

1. "Gatúbela"
2. "Poblado" (Remix)
3. "FRIKI"
4. "Pineapple"
5. "Ahora Me Llama"

Act II

6. "Bichota"
7. "El Makinón"
8. "Leyendas"
9. "Ay, Dios Mio!"
10. "Sejodioto"
11. "DVD"
12. "A Ella"
13. "Provenza"

Act III

13. "Ocean"
14. "El Barco"
15. "Tusa"
16. "200 Copas"
17. "Mamiii"

Encore

18. "Provenza (Remix)"

== Shows ==
List of concerts, showing date, city, country, venue, tickets sold, number of available tickets and amount of gross revenue
Date	City	Country	Venue	Opening Act	Attendance	Revenue
September 6, 2022	Rosemont	United States	Allstate Arena	Agudelo	13,684 / 13,684	$2,485,102
September 8, 2022	Philadelphia	United States	Wells Fargo Center	Agudelo	11,817 / 11,817	$1,566,836
September 10, 2022	Newark	United States	Prudential Center	Agudelo	13,241 / 13,241	$2,585,441
September 13, 2022	New York City	United States	Madison Square Garden	Agudelo	13,575 / 13,575	$2,748,506
September 14, 2022	Washington	United States	Capital One Arena	Agudelo	14,246 / 14,246	$2,472,072
September 15, 2022	New York City	United States	Barclays Center	Agudelo	12,375 / 12,375	$2,089,275
September 17, 2022	Montreal	Canada	Bell Centre	Agudelo	12,971 / 12,971	$1,361,367
September 18, 2022	Toronto	Canada	Scotiabank Arena	Agudelo	12,089 / 12,089	$1,284,232
September 20, 2022	Charlotte	United States	Spectrum Center	Agudelo	13,718 / 13,718	$2,057,745
September 22, 2022	Miami	United States	FTX Arena	Agudelo	12,307 / 12,307	$2,162,917
September 23, 2022	Miami	United States	FTX Arena	Agudelo	12,287 / 12,287	$2,493,583
September 24, 2022	Orlando	United States	Amway Center	Agudelo	12,820 / 12,820	$2,308,655
September 26, 2022	Tampa	United States	Amalie Arena	Agudelo	12,175 / 12,175	$1,971,458
September 27, 2022	Atlanta	United States	State Farm Arena	Agudelo	11,856 / 11,856	$2,042,436
September 29, 2022	Houston	United States	Toyota Center	Agudelo	12,022 / 12,022	$2,355,176
September 30, 2022	Hidalgo	United States	Payne Arena	Agudelo	5,343 / 5,343	$1,207,507
October 4, 2022	Austin	United States	Moody Center	Agudelo	11,711 / 11,711	$2,284,336
October 5, 2022	Dallas	United States	American Airlines Center	Agudelo	13,484 / 13,484	$2,847,119
October 7, 2022	Kansas City	United States	T-Mobile Center	Agudelo	12,752 / 12,752	$1,925,861
October 9, 2022	Denver	United States	Ball Arena	Agudelo	12,584 / 12,584	$2,332,304
October 11, 2022	Phoenix	United States	Footprint Center	Agudelo	12,535 / 12,535	$2,441,092
October 14, 2022	Las Vegas	United States	T-Mobile Arena	Agudelo	14,489 / 14,489	$2,242,555
October 15, 2022	Anaheim	United States	Honda Center	Agudelo	11,819 / 11,819	$2,518,052
October 16, 2022	San Diego	United States	Pechanga Arena	Agudelo	10,458 / 10,458	$1,793,355
October 18, 2022	Sacramento	United States	Golden 1 Center	Agudelo	13,358 / 13,358	$2,328,970
October 20, 2022	San Francisco	United States	Chase Center	Agudelo	13,910 / 13,910	$2,678,110
October 21, 2022	Los Angeles	United States	Crypto.com Arena	Agudelo	13,770 / 13,770	$2,520,947
October 22, 2022	Los Angeles	United States	Crypto.com Arena	Agudelo	13,067 / 13,067	$2,998,273
October 25, 2022	Fresno	United States	Save Mart Center	Agudelo	11,481 / 11,481	$2,230,073
October 27, 2022	Portland	United States	Moda Center	Agudelo	12,726 / 12,726	$2,105,142
October 28, 2022	Seattle	United States	Climate Pledge Arena	Agudelo	13,624 / 13,624	$2,526,943
October 29, 2022	Vancouver	Canada	Rogers Arena	Agudelo	11,201 / 11,201	$934,064
November 2, 2022	Boston	United States	TD Garden	Agudelo	13,345 / 13,345	$2,343,701
Total					412,840 / 412,840 (100%)	$72,243,333

== Awards and nominations ==
Year	Ceremony	Award	Result	Ref.
2023	Latin American Music Awards	Tour of the Year	Won	
2023	Billboard Latin Music Awards	Tour of the Year	Nominated	

== See also ==
- List of highest-grossing concert tours by Latin artists
