= KG0516 =

2021 studio album by Karol G

Studio album by Karol G
- Released: 25 March 2021
- Recorded: 2019–2021
- Genres: Reggaeton; Latin pop
- Length: 58:10
- Language: Spanish
- Label: Universal Latino
- Producer: Ovy on the Drums

Karol G chronology
Ocean (2019)	KG0516 (2021)	Mañana Será Bonito (2023)

Singles from KG0516
- 1. "Tusa" Released: 7 November 2019; 2. "Ay, Dios Mio!" Released: 9 July 2020; 3. "Bichota" Released: 23 October 2020; 4. "Location" Released: 11 February 2021; 5. "El Makinón" Released: 25 March 2021; 6. "El Barco" Released: 11 May 2021; 7. "200 Copas" Released: 13 July 2021

KG0516 is the third studio album by Colombian singer Karol G. It was released on 25 March 2021, through Universal Music Latino. Comprising sixteen tracks, the album is primarily a reggaeton record and features guest appearances by Mariah Angeliq, Camilo, Anuel AA, J Balvin, Nathy Peluso, Ozuna, Yandar & Yostin, Juanka, Brray, Ludacris, Emilee, Nicki Minaj, Wisin & Yandel, Nicky Jam, Ivy Queen, Zion and Alberto Stylee.

KG0516 was supported by seven singles: "Tusa" with Nicki Minaj, "Ay, Dios Mio!", "Bichota", "Location" with Anuel AA and Balvin, "El Makinón" with Angeliq, "El Barco" and "200 Copas".

The album was met with generally positive reviews from music critics and was a commercial success. It debuted inside the top twenty on the US Billboard 200 and atop the US Top Latin Albums.

The recipient of several accolades, KG0516 received a Grammy nomination for Best Música Urbana at the 64th Annual Grammy Awards, becoming her first Grammy nomination. Its songs also garnered three nominations at the 21st and 22nd Annual Latin Grammy Awards, winning the Latin Grammy Award for Best Reggaeton Performance for "Bichota".

== Background ==
Following her second studio album in 2019, Ocean, Giraldo released "China" with Anuel AA, Daddy Yankee, Ozuna and J Balvin.

On 6 November 2019, she announced the release date for "Tusa" with Nicki Minaj through her social media accounts. The song was released the following day as the album's lead single. On 1 April, "Follow" with Anuel AA was released as stand alone single. Following the success of "Tusa", Giraldo stated she was ready to embark on a world tour, but due to the varying international lockdowns, as safety against COVID-19, these plans were momentarily postponed after just one show.

"Ay, Dios Mio!" was announced and released on 9 July 2020, as the second single. On 17 August, Giraldo joined Ozuna and Myke Towers on a remix for "Caramelo". On 23 October, "Bichota" was released as the album's third single. "Location" alongside Anuel AA and Balvin was released on 11 February 2021, as the fourth and last single prior to the album's release.

On 16 March, Giraldo announced via a half-minute video the release date of the album alongside its title, while the cover art, which was photographed by David LaChapelle, was released the next day. The album's track list was revealed the following week, featuring guest appearances from Mariah Angeliq, Camilo, Anuel AA, J Balvin, Nathy Peluso, Ozuna, Yandar & Yostin, Juanka, Brray, Ludacris, Emilee, Nicki Minaj, Wisin & Yandel, Nicky Jam, Ivy Queen, Zion and Alberto Stylee. KG0516 was officially released on 25 March 2021, alongside the album's fifth single, "El Makinón" with Angeliq.

== Title ==
The title KG0516 references a combination of dates and initials, recalling the moment Karol G and her parents signed her first major contract under her stage name.

In an interview with Variety, she explained how the name came to be:

My parents signed a contract on my behalf on May 16th, 2006 and that was the first time that my name as Karol G was written.

== Release and promotion ==
The album was released on March 25, 2021, through Universal Music Latino. It was released on CD, vinyl, digital download and streaming.

"Tusa" was performed for the first time on December 8, 2019, at Pixel 4's Motion Sense Concert Series. On January 10, 2020, Karol G made her debut performance on The Tonight Show Starring Jimmy Fallon, with "Tusa". On August 13, 2020, "Ay, Dios Mío!" was performed for the first time at the 17th Annual Premios Juventud. On September 10, an acoustic live version of the song was uploaded on YouTube. "Bichota" was performed for the first time on November 8, 2020, at the 27th Annual MTV Europe Music Awards. On November 19, 2020, at the 21st Annual Latin Grammy Awards, "Tusa" was performed. On March 24, 2021, "El Barco" was performed for the first time on The Tonight Show Starring Jimmy Fallon. "El Makinón" alongside "Bichota" were performed at the 28th Annual Billboard Music Awards on May 23, 2021. On May 27, 2021, Karol G performed "El Makinón", "200 Copas" and "Contigo Voy a Muerte", the very first for the latter two, at the Tiny Desk Concerts. "200 Copas" was performed at the 18th Annual Premios Juventud on July 22, 2021. In collaboration with Billboard and energy drink Rockstar, Karol G performed "Bichota", "Ay, Dios Mío!", "El Barco", and "DVD" for the Summer Spotlight concert series on September 15, 2021. On October 27, 2021, Karol G embarked on the Bichota Tour, which lasted all through June 21, 2022. Multiple songs from KG0516, among others, were performed. On March 23, 2022, "El Barco" was performed at the Billboard Women in Music. From September 6, 2022 to November 2, 2022, Karol G embarked on the Strip Love Tour, which became the highest grossing tour by a Latin female act in the United States, later surpassed by her own Mañana Será Bonito Tour. On February 19, 2023, Karol G was the headlining act for Viña Del Mar International Song Festival, where multiple songs from KG0516 were performed.

=== Singles ===
"Tusa" with Trinidadian-born rapper Nicki Minaj was released on November 7, 2019, as the album's lead single. The song reached the top spot in the US Billboard Hot Latin Songs and reached the top 50 of the US Billboard Hot 100 chart, at number 42. It was nominated for Record of the Year and Song of the Year at the 21st Annual Latin Grammy Awards.

"Ay, Dios Mío!" was released on July 9, 2020, as the album's second single. It peaked at number 94 on the US Billboard Hot 100 chart. It also peaked inside the top 5 on the US Billboard Hot Latin Songs.

"Bichota" was released as the album's third single on October 23, 2020. It reached the top 80 of the US Billboard Hot 100 chart, at number 72. It also peaked inside the top 3 on the US Billboard Hot Latin Songs. It won the Latin Grammy Award for Best Reggaeton Performance at the 22nd Annual Latin Grammy Awards.

"Location" was released on February 11, 2021, as the album's fourth single. It reached the top 10 on the US Billboard Hot Latin Songs at number 6.

"El Makinón" was released on March 25, 2021, as the album's fifth single. It reached the top 10 on the US Billboard Hot Latin Songs.

"El Barco" was released on May 11, 2021, as the album's sixth single. It reached the top 20 on the US Billboard Hot Latin Songs.

"200 Copas" was released as the album's seventh and final single on July 13, 2021. It reached the top 30 on the US Billboard Hot Latin Songs.

== Critical reception ==
Professional ratings
Review scores
Source	Rating
AllMusic	4.5/5 stars

Writing for AllMusic, Thom Jurek praised the album, including Giraldo's ability to blend in multiple genres, stating, "KG0516 establishes Karol G as a visionary; she pushes hard at urbano's boundaries, blending them into the pop multiverse, only to bring the album's many dimensions to heel under reggaeton's dominance."

== Commercial performance ==
During the first day of release on Spotify, KG0516 broke the record for biggest debut for a Spanish-language album by a woman. The album also debuted at number one on the Top Albums Debut Global Chart.

=== United States ===
KG0516 debuted at number one on the US Top Latin Albums chart, earning 24,000 album-equivalent units (including 4,000 copies in pure album sales) in its first week. The album also debuted at number 20 on the US Billboard 200 and number one on the US Latin Rhythm Albums charts respectively. This became Karol G's first number one debut on the Latin charts and her highest-charting album on the Billboard 200 at that time. In addition, the album also accumulated a total of 27.4 million on-demand streams from its songs, the biggest for a female Latin album at the time.

== Accolades ==
Awards and nominations for KG0516
Year	Ceremony	Category	Result	Ref.
2021	Premios Juventud	Album of the Year	Nominated	
2021	American Music Awards	Favorite Album – Latin	Nominated	
2022	Grammy Awards	Best Música Urbana Album	Nominated	
2022	Billboard Music Awards	Top Latin Album	Won	
2022	iHeartRadio Music Awards	Latin Pop/Reggaeton Album of the Year	Won	
2022	Latin American Music Awards	Album of the Year	Won	
2022	Latin American Music Awards	Favorite Urban Album	Won	
2022	Premios Juventud	Album of the Year	Won	
2022	Premios Lo Nuestro	Album of the Year	Nominated	
2022	Premios Lo Nuestro	Urban Album of the Year	Nominated	
2022	Premios Tu Música Urbano	Album of the Year - Female Artist	Won	
2022	Billboard Latin Music Awards	Top Latin Album of the Year	Nominated	
2022	Billboard Latin Music Awards	Latin Rhythm Album of the Year	Nominated	

== Track listing ==
All songs produced by Ovy on the Drums, except where noted.

KG0516 track listing
No.	Title	Writer(s)	Producer(s)	Length
1.	"Déjalos Que Miren"	Carolina Giraldo; Julio González; Justin Quiles; Daniel Echavarría	Ovy on the Drums; Karol G	2:47
2.	"El Makinón" (with Mariah Angeliq)	Giraldo; Mariah Pérez; Gabriel Mora; Freddy Montalvo; Jose Cruz	Neo	3:29
3.	"200 Copas"	Giraldo; Daniel Félix; Echavarría	Ovy on the Drums; Karol G	3:37
4.	"Contigo Voy a Muerte" (featuring Camilo)	Giraldo; Camilo Echeverry; Kevyn Cruz; Echavarría		3:39
5.	"DVD"	Giraldo; Echavarría		3:18
6.	"El Barco"	Giraldo; Jorge Muñiz; Echavarría	Ovy on the Drums; Karol G	3:23
7.	"Location" (with Anuel AA and J Balvin)	Giraldo; Emmanuel Gazmey; José Osorio; Echavarría		4:23
8.	"Gato Malo" (with Nathy Peluso)	Giraldo; Natalia Peluso; Echavarría		3:45
9.	"Odisea" (with Ozuna)	Giraldo; Juan Ozuna; K. Cruz; Echavarría		3:43
10.	"Bichota"	Giraldo; Gazmey; González; Quiles; Cristian Salazar; Echavarría		2:58
11.	"Sola Es Mejor" (with Yandar & Yostin)	Giraldo; Oscar Gutiérrez; Juan Castañeda; Anderson Arrelan; Echavarría	Gutiérrez; Ovy on the Drums	3:20
12.	"Arranca Pal Carajo" (with Juanka and Brray)	Giraldo; Juan Bauza; Bryan García; Echavarría		4:06
13.	"Ay, Dios Mio!"	Giraldo; Daniel Morales; Echavarría		3:09
14.	"Beautiful Boy" (with Ludacris and Emilee)	Giraldo; Chris Bridges; Echavarría; Kisean Anderson; J. R. Rotem; Ben E. King; Jerry Leiber; Mike Stoller		3:17
15.	"Tusa" (with Nicki Minaj)	Giraldo; Onika Maraj; K. Cruz; Juan Vargas; Echavarría		3:21
16.	"Leyendas" (with Wisin & Yandel and Nicky Jam featuring Ivy Queen, Zion, and Alberto Stylee)	Juan Morera; Llandel Veguilla; Nick Rivera; Martha Pesante; Félix Ortiz; Carlos Alberto; Marcos Masís; Gabriel Pizarro; Rafael Pina; Juana Guerrido; Luis F. Cortes; Nelson Díaz; Annie Lennox; David Stewart	DJ Nelson; Alejandro Armes; Eliot El Mago D Oz	5:55
Total length:				58:10

== Charts ==
=== Weekly charts ===
Chart performance for KG0516
Chart (2021–2024)	Peak position
French Albums (SNEP)	155
Italian Albums (FIMI)	68
Portuguese Albums (AFP)	88
Spanish Albums (Promusicae)	3
Swiss Albums (Schweizer Hitparade)	48
US Billboard 200	20
US Top Latin Albums (Billboard)	1
US Latin Rhythm Albums (Billboard)	1

=== Year-end charts ===
Year-end chart performance for KG0516
Chart (2021)	Position
Spanish Albums (PROMUSICAE)	12
US Billboard 200	171
US Top Latin Albums (Billboard)	6
Chart (2022)	Position
Spanish Albums (PROMUSICAE)	25
Chart (2023)	Position
Spanish Albums (PROMUSICAE)	54

== Certifications ==
Certifications for KG0516
Region	Certification	Certified units/sales
Argentina (CAPIF)	4× Diamond	540,000^{^}
Brazil (Pro-Música Brasil)	Platinum	40,000^{‡}
Colombia	Gold	
Italy (FIMI)	Gold	25,000^{‡}
Mexico (AMPROFON)	3× Diamond+Platinum	2,240,000^{‡}
Spain (Promusicae)	Platinum	40,000^{‡}
United States (RIAA)	11× Platinum (Latin)	660,000^{‡}
Streaming
Central America (CFC)	2× Platinum	14,000,000^{†}
^{^} Shipments figures based on certification alone.^{‡} Sales+streaming figures based on certification alone.^{†} Streaming-only figures based on certification alone.

== See also ==
- 2021 in Latin music
- List of number-one Billboard Latin Albums from the 2020s
- List of number-one Billboard Latin Rhythm Albums of 2021
- List of best-selling albums in Mexico
