= El Barco (song) =

2021 single by Karol G

Single by Karol G

from the album KG0516
- Language: Spanish
- English title: "The Boat"
- Released: May 11, 2021
- Genre: Bossa Nova
- Length: 3:23
- Label: Universal Music Latino
- Songwriters: Carolina Giraldo; Jorge Muñiz; Anthony López (compositor)* Ovy on the Drums
- Producers: Karol G; Ovy on the Drums

Karol G singles chronology
"El Makinon" (2021)	"El Barco" (2021)	"200 Copas" (2021)

Music video
- "El Barco" on YouTube

"El Barco" (transl. "The Boat") is a song by Colombian singer-songwriter Karol G. It was written by Karol G, Jorge Muñiz, Anthony López (compositor) and Ovy on the Drums, and produced by the latter and Giraldo. The single was released on May 11, 2021, through Universal Music Latino, as the sixth single from her third studio album KG0516.

== Background ==
"El Barco" was first released as a promotional single on March 24, 2021, with no official announcement, one day prior to the release of KG0516.

The song was released as a single on May 11, 2021, with the release of its music video, consisting of its performance at The Tonight Show Starring Jimmy Fallon.

== Commercial performance ==
On the US Billboard Hot Latin Songs chart dated for April 10, 2021, the song debuted and peaked at #19, lasting 20 weeks on the chart.

== Awards and nominations ==
Awards and nominations for "El Barco"
Year	Ceremony	Category	Result
2022	Premios Nuestra Tierra	Best Pop Song	Nominated

== Music video ==
The music video for "El Barco" consists of Karol G's live performance on The Tonight Show Starring Jimmy Fallon. The music video was initially posted on Jimmy Fallon's official YouTube channel, but was later removed and uploaded on Karol G's official YouTube channel on May 11, 2021.

== Live performances ==
"El Barco" was first performed on March 24, 2021, on The Tonight Show Starring Jimmy Fallon. In collaboration with Billboard and energy drink Rockstar, Karol G performed the song once again for the Summer Spotlight concert series on September 15, 2021. On March 3, 2022, Giraldo performed the song at the Billboard Women in Music event, where she was honored with The Rulebreaker Award. "El Barco" has been present on the set list of all of Karol G's solo headlining tours, including the Bichota Tour, Strip Love Tour and the Mañana Será Bonito Tour.

== Charts ==
Chart (2021)	Peak position
Spain (PROMUSICAE)	51
US Hot Latin Songs (Billboard)	19
US Latin Pop Airplay (Billboard)	14

== Certifications ==
Certifications for "El Barco"
Region	Certification	Certified units/sales
Mexico (AMPROFON)	Platinum+Gold	210,000^{‡}
Spain (Promusicae)	2× Platinum	120,000^{‡}
United States (RIAA)	5× Platinum (Latin)	300,000^{‡}
^{‡} Sales+streaming figures based on certification alone.

== Release history ==
Release history for "El Barco"
Region	Date	Format	Label	Ref.
Various	March 24, 2021	Digital download; streaming	Universal Music Latino; Universal Music	
