= Mañana Será Bonito Tour =

2023–24 concert tour by Karol G

- Tour by Karol G
- Promotional poster for the tour
- Location: North America; South America; Europe
- Associated albums: Mañana Será Bonito; Bichota Season
- Start date: 10 August 2023
- End date: 23 July 2024
- No. of shows: 62
- Supporting acts: Agudelo; Young Miko; Bad Gyal; Mar Mejía; Jhay P; Nath; Soley; Ñejo; Ryan Castro
- Attendance: 2,278,547
- Box office: $307 million

Karol G concert chronology
- Strip Love Tour (2022); Mañana Será Bonito Tour (2023–24); Viajando Por El Mundo Tour (2026–27)

The Mañana Será Bonito Tour was the fourth concert tour by Colombian singer Karol G, launched in support of her fourth studio album Mañana Será Bonito (2023) and its mixtape/B-side, Bichota Season (2023). The show's setlist also includes additional songs from her previous three albums Unstoppable (2017), Ocean (2019) and KG0516 (2021). The tour began on 10 August 2023, at Allegiant Stadium in Las Vegas, Nevada, and visited cities throughout the Americas and parts of Europe, before ending on 23 July 2024, at the Estadio Santiago Bernabéu in Madrid.

With a gross of over $307 million from an audience of 2.3 million, it became the second highest-grossing Latin tour during its run; as of 2026 it is now the fourth tour on the list, behind Shakira's Las Mujeres Ya No Lloran World Tour, Bad Bunny's World's Hottest Tour and Luis Miguel's Tour 2023–24.

== Background ==
The previously successful tours by Karol G, the $trip Love Tour (2022), as well as the updated leg of her Bichota Tour (2022)—dubbed the Bichota Reloaded Tour—, respectively, grossed nearly $90 million and sold 691,454 tickets across 53 shows in North and Latin America, according to Billboard Boxscore. It was the highest-grossing tour by a Latina, for 2022, and 26th highest-grossing, overall.

Wanting to capitalize on the success of, and tour in-support of, her successful fourth studio album Mañana Será Bonito, Karol G announced new tour dates at larger venues on 27 April 2023, through a video trailer. The singer had initially held three special sold-out album-release concerts at Hiram Bithorn Stadium in San Juan, Puerto Rico in March 2023, featuring surprise guests Feid, Maldy, Mariah Angeliq, Sean Paul, Romeo Santos, and Bad Gyal. Six more North American shows were announced on 1 June. Opening acts were announced on August 4. Latin American and European dates were announced by the year’s end.

== Set list ==
This set list is representative of the show on August 14, 2023, in Santa Clara. It is not representative of all of the concerts of the tour.

Act I

1. "TQG"
2. "Besties"
3. "Mi Cama"
4. "El Barco"
5. "X Si Volvemos"
6. "Tusa"
7. "Amargura"

Act II

8. "Bichota G"
9. "Oki Doki"
10. "Una Noche en Medellín (Remix)"
11. "Qlona"
12. "Sejodioto"
13. "Punto G"
14. "Bichota" / "El Makinon"
15. "Carolina"
16. "Gatúbela"
17. "Tá OK"

Act III

19. "Ocean"
20. "Pero Tú"
21. "Mercurio"
22. "A Ella"
23. "Créeme"

Act IV

24. "Mientras Me Curo del Cora"
25. "Contigo"
26. "Si Antes Te Hubiera Conocido"
27. "Ojos Ferrari"
28. "Tus Gafitas"
29. "Cairo"
30. "Gucci Los Paños"
31. "200 Copas"
32. "Mi Ex Tenía Razón"
33. "Mamiii"
34. "S91"
35. "Provenza"
36. "Mañana Será Bonito"

Notes

- Young Miko joined Karol G onstage to perform "Dispo" during the dates she opened.
- Becky G joined Karol G onstage to perform "Mamiii" on the August 19, 2023, show in Los Angeles.
- Quevedo joined Karol G onstage to perform "Pero Tú" and "Quevedo: Bzrp Music Sessions, Vol. 52 during the shows in Miami, in addition to Bad Gyal joining her to perform "Kármika" the first show.
- Karol G performed "Como la Flor" and "Si Una Vez" by Selena in a tribute to her on the August 31, 2023, show in San Antonio.
- Xavi joined Karol G onstage to perform "La Diabla" and "La Víctima" on the February 10, 2024, show in Mexico City.
- Starting with the first show in Monterrey, "Contigo" was added to the set list.
- Kevin O Chris and DJ Dennis joined Karol G onstage to perform their remix for "Tá OK" on the May 10, 2024, concert in São Paulo. Also, Pabllo Vittar joined the artist to perform "Sua Cara". "A Ella" and "Pero Tu" were not performed, but "Don't Be Shy" was performed after "Cairo".
- Amaia Montero joined Karol G onstage to perform "Rosas" on the July 21, 2024, show in Madrid.
- Bad Gyal, Tiësto and Ryan Castro and Cris MJ joined Karol G onstage to perform "Kármika", "Contigo", and "Una Noche en Medellín", respectively, on the July 22, 2024, show in Madrid.

== Commercial performance ==
The Mañana Será Bonito Tour is the third highest-grossing tour of all time by Latin artists, the highest-grossing tour by Latin female artist and the highest-grossing tour in 2023 by Latin artist in history. Karol is the first female Latin artist in history headlined a sold-out stadium show at Levi's Stadium in Santa Clara, CA, Rose Bowl in Pasadena, CA and 4 shows at Santiago Bernabéu Stadium in Madrid, Spain, establishing herself as the highest-earning Latin touring artist in 2023. She generated $155.3 million in revenue and sold 925,000 tickets in just 20 shows, earning the 11th spot on Billboard's year-end Top Tours chart that includes all music genres.

== Tour dates ==
List of 2023 concerts
Date (2023)	City	Country	Venue	Opening acts	Attendance	Revenue
August 10 (Note: The opening show in Paradise, Nevada, was originally scheduled to happen on August 11, but it was moved a day before due to "production issues".)	Paradise (Note: Promoted as Las Vegas.)	United States	Allegiant Stadium	Agudelo	31,902 / 31,902	$7,212,809
August 14	Santa Clara (Note: Promoted as San Francisco.)	United States	Levi's Stadium	Agudelo	43,363 / 43,363	$6,988,710
August 18	Pasadena (Note: Promoted as Los Angeles.)	United States	Rose Bowl	Agudelo Young Miko	115,703, / 115,703	$25,446,544
August 19	Pasadena	United States	Rose Bowl	Agudelo	115,703, / 115,703	$25,446,544
August 25	Miami Gardens	United States	Hard Rock Stadium	Agudelo Bad Gyal	89,814 / 89,814	$18,578,460
August 26	Miami Gardens	United States	Hard Rock Stadium	Agudelo Bad Gyal	89,814 / 89,814	$18,578,460
August 29	Houston	United States	NRG Stadium	Agudelo Young Miko	48,980 / 48,980	$10,163,164
August 31	San Antonio	United States	Alamodome	Agudelo	40,387 / 40,387	$5,241,375
September 2	Dallas	United States	Cotton Bowl	Agudelo	68,914 / 68,914	$11,313,933
September 7	East Rutherford (Note: Promoted as New York City.)	United States	MetLife Stadium	Agudelo	109,793 / 109,793	$24,373,218
September 8	East Rutherford	United States	MetLife Stadium	Agudelo Young Miko	109,793 / 109,793	$24,373,218
September 15	Chicago	United States	Soldier Field	Agudelo Young Miko	52,505 / 52,505	$10,028,807
September 21	Atlanta	United States	Mercedes-Benz Stadium	Agudelo Young Miko	48,838 / 48,838	$6,581,701
September 24	Orlando	United States	Camping World Stadium	Agudelo Young Miko	49,128 / 49,128	$6,508,388
September 28	Foxborough (Note: Promoted as Boston.)	United States	Gillette Stadium	Agudelo Young Miko	49,134 / 49,134	$6,007,750
December 1 (Note: Promoted as "Mañana Será Bonito Fest".)	Medellín	Colombia	Estadio Atanasio Girardot	Mar Mejía Jhay P Nath Agudelo Young Miko	95,382 / 95,382	$10,746,637
December 2	Medellín	Colombia	Estadio Atanasio Girardot	Soley Jhay P Agudelo Ñejo Ryan Castro	95,382 / 95,382	$10,746,637

List of 2024 concerts
Date (2024)	City	Country	Venue	Opening acts	Attendance	Revenue
February 8	Mexico City	Mexico	Estadio Azteca	—N/a	140,795 / 140,795	$18,410,706
February 9	Mexico City	Mexico	Estadio Azteca	—N/a	140,795 / 140,795	$18,410,706
February 10	Mexico City	Mexico	Estadio Azteca	—N/a	140,795 / 140,795	$18,410,706
February 16	Monterrey	Mexico	Estadio Mobil Super	—N/a	52,643 / 52,643	$7,273,924
February 17	Monterrey	Mexico	Estadio Mobil Super	—N/a	52,643 / 52,643	$7,273,924
February 23	Zapopan (Note: Promoted as Guadalajara.)	Mexico	Estadio Tres de Marzo	—N/a	50,804 / 50,804	$7,675,116
February 24	Zapopan	Mexico	Estadio Tres de Marzo	—N/a	50,804 / 50,804	$7,675,116
March 1	Guatemala City	Guatemala	Explanada Cardales de Cayalá	—N/a	38,610 / 38,610	$5,171,919
March 2	Guatemala City	Guatemala	Explanada Cardales de Cayalá	—N/a	38,610 / 38,610	$5,171,919
March 5	San Salvador	El Salvador	Estadio Cuscatlán	—N/a	28,719 / 28,719	$2,104,317
March 9	San José	Costa Rica	Estadio Nacional	—N/a	104,761 / 104,761	$8,597,495
March 10	San José	Costa Rica	Estadio Nacional	—N/a	104,761 / 104,761	$8,597,495
March 15	Santo Domingo	Dominican Republic	Estadio Olímpico Félix Sánchez	—N/a	54,878 / 54,878	$6,261,995
March 16	Santo Domingo	Dominican Republic	Estadio Olímpico Félix Sánchez	—N/a	54,878 / 54,878	$6,261,995
March 22	Caracas	Venezuela	Estadio Monumental de Caracas Simón Bolivar	Micro TDH, Elena Rose, Agudelo	75,621 / 75,621	$11,397,080
March 23	Caracas	Venezuela	Estadio Monumental de Caracas Simón Bolivar	Micro TDH, Elena Rose, Agudelo	75,621 / 75,621	$11,397,080
April 5	Bogotá	Colombia	Estadio El Campín	—N/a	79,796 / 79,796	$10,071,510
April 6	Bogotá	Colombia	Estadio El Campín	—N/a	79,796 / 79,796	$10,071,510
April 12	Lima	Peru	Estadio San Marcos	—N/a	88,573 / 88,573	$12,033,193
April 13	Lima	Peru	Estadio San Marcos	—N/a	88,573 / 88,573	$12,033,193
April 19	Santiago	Chile	Estadio Nacional Julio Martínez Prádanos	Denise Rosenthal	168,120 / 168,120	$14,941,774
April 20	Santiago	Chile	Estadio Nacional Julio Martínez Prádanos	Denise Rosenthal	168,120 / 168,120	$14,941,774
April 21	Santiago	Chile	Estadio Nacional Julio Martínez Prádanos	Denise Rosenthal	168,120 / 168,120	$14,941,774
April 26	Buenos Aires	Argentina	Estadio Vélez Sarsfield	—N/a	82,818 / 82,818	$8,006,445
April 27	Buenos Aires	Argentina	Estadio Vélez Sarsfield	—N/a	82,818 / 82,818	$8,006,445
May 2	Asunción	Paraguay	Estadio La Nueva Olla	—N/a	33,207 / 33,207	$1,729,377
May 10 (Note: The show in São Paulo, was originally scheduled to happen on May 9 in Espaço Unimed, but it was moved to Centro Esportivo Tietê the day after due to "high demand".)	São Paulo	Brazil	Centro Esportivo Tietê	—N/a	9,247 / 15,174	$980,755
June 8	Zurich	Switzerland	Hallenstadion	—N/a	13,157 / 13,157	$1,300,143
June 11	Cologne	Germany	Lanxess Arena	—N/a	14,541 / 14,541	$1,358,694
June 14	Amsterdam	Netherlands	Ziggo Dome	—N/a	24,869 / 24,869	$2,458,187
June 15	Amsterdam	Netherlands	Ziggo Dome	—N/a	24,869 / 24,869	$2,458,187
June 18	London	England	The O_{2} Arena	—N/a	29,780 / 29,780	$3,608,153
June 19	London	England	The O_{2} Arena	—N/a	29,780 / 29,780	$3,608,153
June 22	Paris	France	Accor Arena	—N/a	28,192 / 28,192	$2,943,889
June 23	Paris	France	Accor Arena	—N/a	28,192 / 28,192	$2,943,889
June 25	Milan	Italy	Mediolanum Forum	—N/a	21,079 / 21,079	$2,138,672
June 26	Milan	Italy	Mediolanum Forum	—N/a	21,079 / 21,079	$2,138,672
June 29	Antwerp	Belgium	Sportpaleis	—N/a	18,226 / 18,226	$1,632,695
July 2	Berlin	Germany	Uber Arena	—N/a	12,054 / 12,054	$1,233,767
July 7	Lisbon	Portugal	MEO Arena	—N/a	33,830 / 33,830	$3,078,892
July 8	Lisbon	Portugal	MEO Arena	—N/a	33,830 / 33,830	$3,078,892
July 20	Madrid	Spain	Estadio Santiago Bernabéu	—N/a	219,943 / 219,943	$23,594,354
July 21	Madrid	Spain	Estadio Santiago Bernabéu	—N/a	219,943 / 219,943	$23,594,354
July 22	Madrid	Spain	Estadio Santiago Bernabéu	—N/a	219,943 / 219,943	$23,594,354
July 23	Madrid	Spain	Estadio Santiago Bernabéu	—N/a	219,943 / 219,943	$23,594,354
Total					2,278,547 / 2,284,474 (99.74%)	$307,194,548

== Awards and nominations ==
Year	Ceremony	Award	Result	Ref.
2023	Billboard Music Awards	Top Latin Touring Artist	Won	
2024	Pollstar Awards	Latin Tour of the Year	Won	
2024	Lo Nuestro Awards	Tour of the Year	Won	
2024	Latin American Music Awards	Tour of the Year	Nominated	
2024	Billboard Latin Music Awards	Tour of the Year	Won	
2024	Billboard Music Awards	Top Latin Touring Artist	Nominated	

== See also ==
- List of highest-grossing concert tours by Latin artists
- List of highest-grossing concert tours by women
