= El Makinón =

2021 single by Karol G and Mariah Angeliq

Single by Karol G and Mariah Angeliq

from the album KG0516
- Language: Spanish
- English title: The Big Machine
- Released: March 25, 2021
- Genre: Reggaeton; Latin urban
- Length: 3:29
- Label: Universal Music Latino
- Songwriters: Carolina Giraldo; Mariah Pérez; Gabriel Mora; Freddy Montalvo; Jose Cruz
- Producer: Neo

Karol G singles chronology
"Location" (2021)	"El Makinón" (2021)	"El Barco" (2021)

Mariah Angeliq singles chronology
"Yugo Desigual" (2021)	"El Makinon" (2021)	"Mala de Verdad" (2021)

Music video
- "El Makinon" on YouTube

"El Makinón" (transl. "The Big Machine") is a reggaetón song by Colombian singer-songwriter Karol G and American singer Mariah Angeliq. It was written by the latter alongside Gabriel Mora, Freddy Montalvo and Jose Cruz, and produced by Neo. The song was released on March 25, 2021, through Universal Music Latino, as the fifth single from Karol G's third studio album, KG0516 (2021).

== Background ==
The song was first revealed through Karol G's album track list announcement for her third studio album KG0516, on March 22, 2021. The song was released on March 25, 2021, alongside the release of the album.

== Critical reception ==
Billboard stated: "Infectious head-bopping, hip-swaying reggaetón jam about breaking all the rules with the girls. A risqué scene towards the end proves, once again, that the new Karol is unapologetic."

== Commercial performance ==
The song debuted at number 9 on the Billboard Hot Latin Songs chart dated April 10, 2021. It peaked at number 6 on the chart dated May 1, 2021. It failed to enter the Billboard Hot 100 chart but entered and peaked at number 4 on the US Bubbling Under Hot 100 chart dated June 5, 2021. The song received a Latin diamond certification by the Recording Industry Association of America (RIAA) on November 24, 2021, for sales of 600,000 equivalent-units.

== Awards and nominations ==
Awards and nominations for "El Makinón"
Year	Ceremony	Category	Result
2021	MTV Millennial Awards	Viral Anthem	Nominated
2021	Premios Juventud	Girl Power (Best Female Collaboration)	Nominated
2021	WME Awards	Latin American Song	Won
2022	BMI Latin Awards	Award Winning Song	Won
2022	Latin American Music Awards	Collaboration of the Year	Won
2022	Premios Tu Música Urbano	Video of the Year	Won

== Music video ==
The music video for "El Makinon" was directed by Jose-Emilio Sagaró, filmed in The Bronx, NY, USA, produced by Omar Reynoso and was released on Karol G's YouTube channel on March 25, 2021. The arresting officer role is played by American actor Simonas Zmuidzinas.

== Live performances ==
"El Makinon" was performed for the first time at the 28th Annual Billboard Music Awards on May 23, 2021. On May 27, 2021, Giraldo performed the song at the Tiny Desk Concerts. "El Makinon" has been present on the set list of all of Karol G's solo headlining tours, including the Bichota Tour, Strip Love Tour and the Mañana Será Bonito Tour.

== Charts ==
Weekly chart performance for "El Makinon"
Chart (2021)	Peak position
Argentina Hot 100 (Billboard)	18
Global 200 (Billboard)	39
Colombia (National-Report)	14
Ecuador (Monitor Latino)	7
Spain (PROMUSICAE)	6
US Bubbling Under Hot 100 (Billboard)	6
US Hot Latin Songs (Billboard)	6
US Latin Airplay (Billboard)	1
US Latin Rhythm Airplay (Billboard)	1

== Certifications ==
Certifications for "El Makinon"
Region	Certification	Certified units/sales
Argentina (CAPIF)	Platinum	20,000^{*}
Brazil (Pro-Música Brasil)	Platinum	40,000^{‡}
Mexico (AMPROFON)	2× Diamond+4× Platinum	1,960,000^{‡}
Spain (Promusicae)	3× Platinum	180,000^{‡}
United States (RIAA)	11× Platinum (Latin)	660,000^{‡}
Streaming
Central America (CFC)	3× Platinum	21,000,000^{†}
^{*} Sales figures based on certification alone.^{‡} Sales+streaming figures based on certification alone.^{†} Streaming-only figures based on certification alone.

== Release history ==
Release history for "El Makinon"
Region	Date	Format	Label	Ref.
Various	March 25, 2021	Digital download; streaming	Universal Music Latino; Universal Music	

== See also ==
- List of best-selling singles in Mexico
- List of Billboard Hot Latin Songs and Latin Airplay number ones of 2021
