= 200 Copas =

2021 single by Karol G

Single by Karol G

from the album KG0516
- Language: Spanish
- English title: "200 Cups"
- Released: July 13, 2021
- Genre: Corridos Tumbados; Musica Popular
- Length: 3:37
- Label: Universal Music Latino
- Songwriters: Carolina Giraldo; Daniel Felix; Daniel Echavarría
- Producers: Karol G; Ovy on the Drums

Karol G singles chronology
"El Barco" (2021)	"200 Copas" (2021)	"Poblado (Remix)" (2021)

Music video
- "200 Copas" on YouTube

"200 Copas" (transl. "200 Cups") is a song by Colombian singer-songwriter Karol G. It was written by Karol G, Daniel Felix and Ovy on the Drums, and produced the latter and Giraldo. The song was released on July 13, 2021, through Universal Music Latino, as the seventh and final single from her third studio album, KG0516.

== Background ==
The song was first revealed through Karol G’s album track list announcement for her third studio album KG0516, on March 22, 2021. The song was released on March 25, alongside the album. It was released as the seventh and final single with a music video on July 13, 2021.

== Critical reception ==
Billboard stated: "As usual, Karol sounds great testing new waters. With "200 Copas", co-written by Ovy, Karol and corrido tumbado artist Danny Felix, Karol not only shares her best advice to a friend, but also accompanies her in her heartbreak."

== Commercial performance ==
"200 Copas" debuted at number 44 on the US Billboard Hot Latin Songs chart dated April 10, 2021. The song reached its peak at number 28 on the chart dated August 7, 2021. The song received a 3 times Latin platinum certification by the Recording Industry Association of America (RIAA) on November 24, 2021, for sales of 180,000 equivalent-units.

== Awards and nominations ==
Awards and nominations for "200 Copas"
Year	Ceremony	Category	Result
2022	Latino Music Awards	Best Popular Song	Nominated
2022	Latino Music Awards	Best Popular Video	Won
2022	Premios Nuestra Tierra	Best Popular Song	Won

== Music video ==
The music video for "200 Copas" was directed by Cole Santiago and was released on Karol G’s YouTube channel on July 13, 2021.

== Live performances ==
On May 27, 2021, Karol G performed "200 Copas" for the first time at the Tiny Desk Concerts. It was performed once again at the 18th Annual Premios Juventud on July 22, 2021. On February 19, 2023, Karol G was the headlining act for Viña Del Mar International Song Festival, where the song was performed. "200 Copas" has been present on the set list of all of Karol G's solo headlining tours, including the Bichota Tour, Strip Love Tour and the Mañana Será Bonito Tour.

== Charts ==
Chart (2021)	Peak position
Argentina Hot 100 (Billboard)	96
US Hot Latin Songs (Billboard)	28

== Certifications ==
Certifications for "200 Copas"
Region	Certification	Certified units/sales
Mexico (AMPROFON)	2× Platinum+Gold	350,000^{‡}
Spain (Promusicae)	Platinum	60,000^{‡}
United States (RIAA)	3× Platinum (Latin)	180,000^{‡}
Streaming
Central America (CFC)	Platinum	7,000,000^{†}
^{‡} Sales+streaming figures based on certification alone.^{†} Streaming-only figures based on certification alone.

== Release history ==
Release history for "200 Copas"
Region	Date	Format	Label	Ref.
Various	March 25, 2021	Digital download; streaming	Universal Music Latino; Universal Music	
