= Ay, Dios Mio! =

2020 single by Karol G

"Ay, Dios, Mío!"

Single by Karol G

from the album KG0516
- Language: Spanish
- English title: "Oh My God!"
- Released: July 9, 2020
- Genre: Pop
- Length: 3:10
- Label: Universal Music Latino
- Songwriters: Carolina Giraldo; Daniel Alejandro Morales Reyes; Daniel Echavarría Oviedo
- Producer: Ovy on the Drums

Karol G singles chronology
"La Vida Continuó" (2020)	"Ay, Dios, Mío!" (2020)	"Caramelo (Remix)" (2020)

Music video
- "Ay, DiOs, Mío!" on YouTube

"Ay, Dios Mío!" (transl. "Oh My God!"; stylized as "Ay, DiOs Mío!) is a song by Colombian singer-songwriter Karol G. It was written by Karol G, Danny Ocean and Ovy on the Drums, and produced by the latter. The song was released on July 9, 2020, through Universal Music Latino, as the second single from her third studio album, KG0516.

== Background ==
Karol G announced the release of "Ay, Díos Mío" hours prior to its release, announcing it through her social media accounts. The song was released on July 9, 2020.

== Composition ==
On an interview with Billboard, Giraldo revealed how the song was inspired by her then partner, Anuel AA:

In this song [I] tell the story of how I met Ema. The song starts from the moment Ema first wrote me a DM on Instagram and how he sent me DMs in Instagram and WhatsApp, until the day we met and went out. And when we went out, in the middle of dancing, and whether I'd go home with him or not.

== Critical reception ==
Billboard stated "It’s her own, very personal, and feminine, take on reggaeton; a Karol G stamp that makes her stand out in the genre."

== Commercial performance ==
"Ay, Dios Mío!" debuted and peaked at number 94 on the US Billboard Hot 100 chart dated October 10, 2020. The song debuted at number 27 on the Billboard Hot Latin Songs chart dated July 25, 2020. It peaked at number 5 on the chart dated September 12, 2020. The song received a Latin diamond certification by the Recording Industry Association of America (RIAA) on April 1, 2021, for sales of 600,000 equivalent-units.

== Awards and nominations ==
Awards and nominations for "Ay, Dios Mio!"
Year	Ceremony	Category	Result
2021	Premios Juventud	La Más Pegajosa (Catchiest Song)	Won
2021	Premios Nuestra Tierra	Best Video	Nominated
2021	Premios Nuestra Tierra	Audience Favorite Song	Nominated
2023	BMI Latin Awards	Award Winning Song	Won

== Music video ==
The music video for "Ay, Dios Mío" was directed by Mike Ho and was released on Karol G's YouTube channel on July 9, 2020.

== Live performances ==
On August 13, 2020, "Ay, Dios Mío!" was performed for the first time at the 17th Annual Premios Juventud. On September 10, an acoustic live version of the song was uploaded on YouTube. In collaboration with Billboard and energy drink Rockstar, Karol G performed "Ay, Dios Mío!" alongside other songs for the Summer Spotlight concert series on September 15, 2021. On February 19, 2023, Karol G was the headlining act for Viña Del Mar International Song Festival, where the song was performed. "Ay, Dios Mío!" has been present on the set list of all of Karol G's solo headlining tours, including the Bichota Tour, Strip Love Tour and the Mañana Será Bonito Tour.

== Charts ==
=== Weekly charts ===
Weekly chart performance for "Ay, Dios Mios!"
Chart (2020–21)	Peak position
Argentina Hot 100 (Billboard)	2
Global 200 (Billboard)	25
Spain (PROMUSICAE)	3
US Billboard Hot 100	94
US Hot Latin Songs (Billboard)	5
US Latin Airplay (Billboard)	1
US Latin Pop Airplay (Billboard)	1
US Latin Rhythm Airplay (Billboard)	1
Venezuela (Record Report)	41

=== Year-end charts ===
2020 year-end chart performance for "Ay, Dios Mio!"
Chart (2020)	Position
Argentina Airplay (Monitor Latino)	52
Bolivia Airplay (Monitor Latino)	21
Colombia Airplay (Monitor Latino)	34
Colombia Streaming (Monitor Latino)	20
Dominican Republic Airplay (Monitor Latino)	48
Dominican Republic Streaming (Monitor Latino)	17
Ecuador Airplay (Monitor Latino)	35
Ecuador Streaming (Monitor Latino)	15
El Salvador Airplay (Monitor Latino)	15
El Salvador Streaming (Monitor Latino)	19
Guatemala Airplay (Monitor Latino)	42
Guatemala Streaming (Monitor Latino)	36
Honduras Airplay (Monitor Latino)	68
Nicaragua Airplay (Monitor Latino)	29
Paraguay Airplay (Monitor Latino)	30
Peru Airplay (Monitor Latino)	31
Peru Streaming (Monitor Latino)	25
Spain (PROMUSICAE)	40
US Hot Latin Songs (Billboard)	24
Uruguay Airplay (Monitor Latino)	58
Venezuela (Monitor Latino)	20

2021 year-end chart performance for "Ay, Dios Mio!"
Chart (2021)	Position
US Hot Latin Songs (Billboard)	82

== Certifications ==
Certifications and sales for "Ay, Dios Mio!"
Region	Certification	Certified units/sales
Argentina (CAPIF)	2× Platinum	40,000^{*}
Brazil (Pro-Música Brasil)	Platinum	40,000^{‡}
Canada (Music Canada)	Gold	40,000^{‡}
Mexico (AMPROFON)	9× Diamond+Platinum+Gold	2,790,000^{‡}
Spain (Promusicae)	3× Platinum	180,000^{‡}
United States (RIAA)	15× Platinum (Latin)	900,000^{‡}
Streaming
Central America (CFC)	3× Platinum	21,000,000^{†}
^{*} Sales figures based on certification alone.^{‡} Sales+streaming figures based on certification alone.^{†} Streaming-only figures based on certification alone.

== Release history ==
Release dates for "Ay, Dios Mio!"
Region	Date	Format	Label	Ref.
Various	July 6, 2020	Digital download; streaming	Universal Music Latino; Universal Music	

== See also ==
- List of Billboard number-one Latin songs of 2020
- List of best-selling singles in Spain
- List of best-selling singles in Mexico
