= Leyendas (Karol G song) =

2021 song by Karol G, Wisin & Yandel and Nicky Jam

Song by Karol G, Wisin & Yandel and Nicky Jam featuring Ivy Queen, Zion and Alberto Stylee

from the album KG0516
- Language: Spanish
- English title: Legends
- Released: March 25, 2021
- Genre: Reggaeton
- Length: 5:56
- Label: Universal Latin
- Songwriters: Juan Morera; Llandel Veguilla; Nick Rivera; Martha Pesante; Félix Ortiz; Carlos Alberto; Marcos Masís; Gabriel Pizarro; Rafael Pina; Juana Guerrido; Luis Cortes; Nelson Díaz; Annie Lennox; David Stewart
- Producers: DJ Nelson; Alejandro Armes; Eliot El Mago D Oz

"Leyendas" (transl. "Legends") is a song performed and arranged by Colombian singer Karol G, released on March 25, 2021, through Universal Music Latino, from her third studio album KG0516 (2021). "Leyendas" is not an original composition by Karol G, but rather a remixing of several famous reggaetón songs by Ivy Queen, Wisin & Yandel, Nicky Jam, Zion and Alberto Stylee, respectively.

== Background ==
The song was first revealed through Karol G's album track list announcement for her third studio album KG0516 on March 22, 2021. The song was released on March 25, 2021 with the release of the album.

== Composition ==
"Leyendas" interpolates "Quiero Bailar" by Ivy Queen, "En La Disco Bailoteo" by Wisin & Yandel, "Me Pones en Tension" by Zion & Lennox, "Yo No Soy Tu Marido" by Nicky Jam, and "Vengo Acabando" by Wisin & Yandel featuring Alberto Stylee and Franco El Gorila.

The track features Karol G singing portions of each song along with newly recorded vocals by the original artists.

On an exclusive interview with MoluscoTV Karol G explained why she wanted to make the song: "The most beautiful thing for me in making "Leyendas" was that I called all the artists and told them the idea of the song. That this genre has grown and evolved because I feel everyone collaborates with everyone, from the biggest artist to the smallest ones and new ones, and that has made the genre evolve. I choose my favorite classics, called the artists and asked them. No one told me 'no', there were no egos, and you know what? That makes them more of a legends, because from them, is that we the new ones learn to let go of fights we might have with each other, from those big artists."

In the same interview, Giraldo also revealed how Chencho from Plan B was supposed to appear on the track, but due to problems with his label, was denied permission: "Hopefully one day you’ll guys will get to hear the verse he made. For me that was the worse feeling, that he didn’t make it into the final cut, he deserved it because of how fire his verse was."

== Critical reception ==
Billboard called the song an essential track to the album, stating "The Colombian artist reeled in some of the biggest pioneers in reggaetón’s history, paying a nearly six-minute tribute to the genre’s earlier years. You’d think that the closing track would wrap up Karol’s new album nicely — but this only marks the beginning for the rising star."

== Chart performance ==
Chart (2021)	Peak Position
US Latin Digital Song Sales (Billboard)	7

== Certifications ==
Certifications for "Leyendas"
Region	Certification	Certified units/sales
Mexico (AMPROFON)	Gold	70,000^{‡}
United States (RIAA)	Platinum (Latin)	60,000^{‡}
Streaming
Central America (CFC)	Gold	3,500,000^{†}
^{‡} Sales+streaming figures based on certification alone.^{†} Streaming-only figures based on certification alone.
