= Bichota =

2020 single by Karol G

Single by Karol G

from the album KG0516
- Language: Spanish
- Released: October 23, 2020
- Genre: Reggaeton
- Length: 2:58
- Label: Universal Latino
- Songwriters: Carolina Giraldo; Julio González; Justin Quiles; Cristian Salazar; Daniel Echavarría; Emmanuel Gazmey
- Producer: Ovy on the Drums

Karol G singles chronology
"Caramelo (Remix)" (2020)	"Bichota" (2020)	"Location" (2021)

Music video
- "BICHOTA" on YouTube

"Bichota" is a song by Colombian singer-songwriter Karol G. It was written by Karol G, Lenny Tavárez, J Quiles, Cristián Salazar and Ovy on the Drums, and produced by the latter. The song was released on October 23, 2020, through Universal Music Latino, as the third single from her third studio album KG0516 (2021).

== Background ==
In mid-October 2020, "Bichota" was first teased several days prior to its release through Karol G's social media accounts, with a post captioning the letter "B" and an emoji of "coming soon". A subsequent letter was released each day until the word "bichota" was spelled-out. The song was officially announced on October 19, 2020. The single's cover artwork, shot by photographer Alfredo Flores, was revealed the following day. The song was released on October 23, 2020.

== Composition ==
The word "bichota" is a play on words, a feminine form of the Puerto Rican Spanish term "bichote". In the context of Puerto Rican underground culture, a "bichote" is someone affiliated in drug trafficking, a top-ranking member of a gang, a mobster, or "capo" ("boss" in Spanish). The bichote is highly regarded, and is considered important and influential. He has typically earned this reputation through repeated success on the black market, namely in the moving of large amounts of illegal drugs, jewelry or firearms, among other activities.

Despite its initial meaning, Karol G decided to make it her own, giving the word a slightly new meaning. Rather than its use the context of illicit activities, Karol G gives it a positive, empowering sense, stating:

[It's] a moment of feeling sexy, flirtatious, daring, strong, empowered, and to a certain extent, translates into personal motivation and self-confidence. We are all super Bichotas inside. It’s about believing and working so that the rest of the world can see it too.

== Critical reception ==
Billboard stated how the song set the tone for the album, saying: "She came headstrong on the Billboard Hot 100-charting banger with a fierce attitude, fierce beats, and fierce lyrics."

== Commercial performance ==
"Bichota" debuted at #97, on the US Billboard Hot 100 chart dated for December 5, 2020. The song reached its peak in its 10th week at #72, for the chart dated February 13, 2021. At the time it became the highest-charting Spanish-language song by a female soloist on the Billboard Hot 100.

On the US Billboard Hot Latin Songs chart dated for November 7, 2020 the song debuted at #7, and reached its peak at #3 on the chart dated for December 5, 2020. On the Billboard Argentina Hot 100 chart, the song reached #1.

The song received a double Latin diamond certification by the Recording Industry Association of America (RIAA) on November 24, 2021, for sales equating to over 1.2 million units. In Mexico, the song was certified 21× diamond and 3× platinum by the Asociación Mexicana de Productores de Fonogramas y Videogramas (AMPROFON), for sales equivalent to 6.4 million units, becoming the highest-certified song by a solo act in the country, and second overall behind her other hit single, "Tusa" (2019) with Nicki Minaj.

== Awards and nominations ==
Awards and nominations for "Bichota"
Year	Ceremony	Category	Result
2021	Heat Latin Music Awards	Best Video	Nominated
2021	Latin Grammy Awards	Best Reggaeton Performance	Won
2021	Latino Music Awards	Song of the Year	Nominated
2021	Latino Music Awards	Best Urban Song	Won
2021	MTV Millennial Awards	Hit of the Year	Nominated
2021	MTV Video Music Awards	Best Latin	Nominated
2021	Premios Juventud	El Traffic Jam	Won
2021	Premios Juventud	La Coreo Más Hot (Hottest Choreography)	Won
2021	Premios Juventud	Social Dance Challenge	Won
2021	Premios Nuestra Tierra	Urban Song	Won
2022	BMI Latin Awards	Award Winning Song	Won
2022	iHeartRadio Music Awards	Latin Pop/Reggaeton Song of the Year	Nominated
2022	Premios Lo Nuestro	Song of the Year	Won
2022	Premios Lo Nuestro	Urban Song of the Year	Won
2022	Premios Nuestra Tierra	Urban Song	Won

== Music video ==
The music video for "Bichota" was directed by Colin Tilley and was released on Karol G's YouTube channel on October 23, 2020.

A second music video was released exclusively on her Facebook page on November 12, 2020. As of January 2023, it has over 337 million views.

== Live performances ==
"Bichota" was performed for the first time on November 8, 2020, at the 27th Annual MTV Europe Music Awards. The song was performed once again at the 28th Annual Billboard Music Awards on May 23, 2021. In collaboration with Billboard and energy drink Rockstar, Karol G performed "Bichota" for the Summer Spotlight concert series on September 15, 2021. On February 19, 2023, Karol G was the headlining act for Viña Del Mar International Song Festival, where the song was performed. "Bichota" has been present on the set list of all of Karol G's solo headlining tours, including the Bichota Tour, Strip Love Tour and the Mañana Será Bonito Tour.

== Charts ==
=== Weekly charts ===
Weekly chart performance for "Bichota"
Chart (2020–2021)	Peak position
Argentina Hot 100 (Billboard)	1
Global 200 (Billboard)	7
Bolivia (Monitor Latino)	3
Chile (Monitor Latino)	11
Colombia (National-Report)	2
Dominican Republic (Monitor Latino)	1
Paraguay (SGP)	20
Peru (Monitor Latino)	1
Spain (PROMUSICAE)	4
US Billboard Hot 100	72
US Hot Latin Songs (Billboard)	3
US Latin Airplay (Billboard)	1
US Latin Rhythm Airplay (Billboard)	1
Venezuela (Monitor Latino)	3

=== Year-end charts ===
Year-end chart performance for "Bichota"
Chart (2021)	Position
Global 200 (Billboard)	62
Spain (PROMUSICAE)	53
US Hot Latin Songs (Billboard)	8

== Certifications ==
Certifications for "Bichota"
Region	Certification	Certified units/sales
Argentina (CAPIF)	Platinum	20,000^{*}
Brazil (Pro-Música Brasil)	2× Platinum	80,000^{‡}
Canada (Music Canada)	Platinum	80,000^{‡}
Colombia	Gold	
Ecuador	Gold	
Mexico (AMPROFON)	21× Diamond+3× Platinum	6,480,000^{‡}
Peru	Platinum	
Portugal (AFP)	Gold	5,000^{‡}
Spain (Promusicae)	4× Platinum	240,000^{‡}
United States (RIAA)	2× Diamond (Latin)	1,200,000^{‡}
Streaming
Central America (CFC)	Diamond	35,000,000^{†}
^{*} Sales figures based on certification alone.^{‡} Sales+streaming figures based on certification alone.^{†} Streaming-only figures based on certification alone.

== Release history ==
Release history for "Bichota"
Region	Date	Format	Label	Ref.
Various	October 23, 2020	Digital download; streaming	Universal Latino	
Various	January 20, 2025	7-inch vinyl	Universal Latino	

== See also ==
- List of Billboard number-one Latin songs of 2021
