= Location (Karol G song) =

Single by Karol G, Anuel AA and J Balvin

from the album KG0516
- Language: Spanish
- Released: February 11, 2021
- Length: 4:23
- Label: Universal Music Latino
- Songwriters: Carolina Giraldo; Daniel Echavarria; Emmanuel Gazmey; José Osorio
- Producer: Ovy on the Drums

Karol G singles chronology
"Bichota" (2020)	"Location" (2021)	"El Makinon" (2021)

Anuel AA singles chronology
"Municiones" (2021)	"Location" (2021)	"Fiel (remix)" (2021)

J Balvin singles chronology
"Billetes Azules" (2021)	"Location" (2021)	"Poblado (Remix)" (2021)

Music video
- "Location" on YouTube

"Location" is a song by Colombian singer-songwriter Karol G with Puerto Rican rapper Anuel AA and Colombian singer and rapper J Balvin. Written alongside Ovy on the Drums and produced by the latter, the song was released on February 11, 2021, through Universal Music Latino, as the fourth single from her third studio album KG0516.

== Background ==
The song was first teased on January 1, 2021, through Karol G's social media accounts, with a post including lyrics for the song. The song continued to be teased by the singer until its official announcement, which was made hours prior to its release. The song was released on February 11, 2021.

== Composition ==
"Location" is a country and reggaeton song, being the first time that Karol G experimented with the latter genre.

I like to give my fans a unique experience with every single release, both musically and visually. It’s a very special song for me because I was able to collaborate with artists that I admire and we were able to fuse reggaeton/hip-hop/country influences into an amazing song and video filled with energy and rodeo vibes.

— Karol G on the release for "Location"

== Commercial performance ==
"Location" debuted and peaked at number 6 on the Billboard Hot Latin Songs chart dated February 27, 2021. It failed to enter the Billboard Hot 100 chart but entered and peaked at number 3 on the US Bubbling Under Hot 100 chart dated February 27, 2021. The song received a 6 times Latin platinum certification by the Recording Industry Association of America (RIAA) on November 24, 2021, for sales of 360,000 equivalent-units.

== Awards and nominations ==
Awards and nominations for "Location"
Year	Ceremony	Category	Result
2021	Heat Latin Music Awards	Best Video	Nominated
2021	Los 40 Music Awards	Best Latin Video	Nominated
2021	MTV Millennial Awards	Music-Ship of the Year (Best Collaboration)	Nominated
2022	Premios Lo Nuestro	Urban Collaboration of the Year	Nominated

== Music video ==
The music video for "Location" was directed by Colin Tilley and was released on Karol G's YouTube channel on February 11, 2021. As of April 2023, it has over 452 million views.

== Live performances ==
"Location" was present on the set list for Karol G's Bichota Tour, which embarked on October 27, 2021, through June 21, 2022.

== Charts ==
Chart (2021)	Peak position
Argentina Hot 100 (Billboard)	46
Global 200 (Billboard)	63
Spain (PROMUSICAE)	13
US Bubbling Under Hot 100 (Billboard)	3
US Hot Latin Songs (Billboard)	6
US Latin Airplay (Billboard)	1
US Latin Rhythm Airplay (Billboard)	1

== Certifications ==
Certifications for "Location"
Region	Certification	Certified units/sales
Argentina	Gold	
Mexico (AMPROFON)	Diamond+Platinum+Gold	910,000^{‡}
Spain (Promusicae)	Platinum	60,000^{‡}
United States (RIAA)	6× Platinum (Latin)	360,000^{‡}
Streaming
Central America (CFC)	Platinum	7,000,000^{†}
^{‡} Sales+streaming figures based on certification alone.^{†} Streaming-only figures based on certification alone.

== See also ==
- List of Billboard number-one Latin songs of 2021
