= Caramelo (song) =

2020 single by Ozuna

Single by Ozuna

from the album ENOC
- Language: Spanish
- English title: "Candy"
- Released: June 11, 2020 (original); August 17, 2020 (remix)
- Genre: Reggaeton
- Length: 3:38
- Label: Sony Latin
- Songwriters: Alexis Gotay; Eduardo Alfonso Vargas Berrios; Juan Carlos Ozuna Rosado; Michael Masis; Starlin Rivas Batista; Yazid Rivera López
- Producers: Tainy; Yazid; Hi Flow; Gotay

Ozuna singles chronology
"Mamacita" (2020)	"Caramelo" (2020)	"Mi Niña" (2020)

Karol G singles chronology
"Ay, Dios Mío!" (2020)	"Caramelo (Remix)" (2020)	"Bichota" (2020)

Myke Towers singles chronology
"Michael X" (2020)	"Caramelo (Remix)" (2020)	"La Luz" (2020)

"Caramelo" is a song by Puerto Rican singer Ozuna. The track was released on June 11, 2020 through Sony Music Latin as the lead single of his fourth studio album ENOC (2020). The track, written by Ozuna alongside its respective producers, became a top ten hit in Spain, Colombia, Argentina and other selected European and countries in Latin America. In the United States, the track peaked at the 76th position on the Billboard Hot 100 chart, while reaching the top ten on the Global 200. Ozuna united with Colombian singer Karol G as well as with Puerto Rican rapper Myke Towers for a remixed version of the song, released in August of the same year.

== Background ==
The first rumors of a possible new Ozuna studio album, was when the singer began to put the #ENOC hashtag in his social media posts. On June 9, 2020, the singer announced the song through his social networks as the first single of his upcoming project. The song features a remix released on August 17, 2020, with the participation of Karol G and Myke Towers.

== Charts ==
=== Weekly charts ===
Weekly chart performance for "Caramelo"
Chart (2020–21)	Peak position
Argentina Hot 100 (Billboard)	3
Colombia (National-Report)	3
Global 200 (Billboard)	16
Italy (FIMI)	17
Mexico (Billboard Mexican Airplay)	2
Portugal (AFP)	42
Spain (PROMUSICAE)	1
Switzerland (Schweizer Hitparade)	42
US Billboard Hot 100	76
US Hot Latin Songs (Billboard)	3
US Latin Airplay (Billboard)	1
US Latin Rhythm Airplay (Billboard)	1

=== Year-end charts ===
2020 year-end chart performance for "Caramelo"
Chart (2020)	Position
Argentina Airplay (Monitor Latino)	22
Italy (FIMI)	55
Spain (PROMUSICAE)	8
US Hot Latin Songs (Billboard)	11

2021 year-end chart performance for "Caramelo"
Chart (2021)	Position
US Hot Latin Songs (Billboard)	55

== Certifications ==
Certification for "Caramelo"
Region	Certification	Certified units/sales
Italy (FIMI)	2× Platinum	140,000^{‡}
Mexico (AMPROFON)	Diamond+4× Platinum	540,000^{‡}
Spain (Promusicae)	4× Platinum	160,000^{‡}
Streaming
Central America (CFC)	3× Platinum	21,000,000^{†}
^{‡} Sales+streaming figures based on certification alone.^{†} Streaming-only figures based on certification alone.

Certification for "Caramelo" (Remix)
Region	Certification	Certified units/sales
Mexico (AMPROFON)	Platinum	60,000^{‡}
Spain (Promusicae)	2× Platinum	120,000^{‡}
Streaming
Central America (CFC)	2× Platinum	14,000,000^{†}
^{‡} Sales+streaming figures based on certification alone.^{†} Streaming-only figures based on certification alone.

== Release history ==
Release date for "Caramelo"
Region	Date	Format	Version	Label
Various	June 11, 2020	Digital download; streaming	Original	Sony Latin
Various	August 17, 2020	Digital download; streaming	Remix	Sony Latin

== See also ==
- List of Billboard number-one Latin songs of 2020
