= Tusa (song) =

2019 song by Karol G and Nicki Minaj

Single by Karol G and Nicki Minaj

from the album KG0516
- Language: Spanish; English
- Released: November 7, 2019
- Genre: Reggaeton; Latin pop
- Length: 3:20
- Label: Universal Latino; Republic
- Songwriters: Keityn; Karol G; Nicki Minaj; Ovy on the Drums
- Producer: Ovy on the Drums

Karol G singles chronology
"China" (2019)	"Tusa" (2019)	"Follow" (2020)

Nicki Minaj singles chronology
"Welcome to the Party" (2019)	"Tusa" (2019)	"Nice to Meet Ya" (2020)

Music video
- "Tusa" on YouTube

"Tusa" is a song by Colombian singer-songwriter Karol G and Trinidadian rapper Nicki Minaj. Written alongside Keityn and producer Ovy on the Drums, the song was released on November 7, 2019 by Universal Music Latino and Republic Records, as the lead single from Karol G's third studio album, KG0516 (2021).

== Background ==
The song was announced a day prior to its release through Karol G's social media platforms, with a snippet of the music video and release date. The song was officially released on November 7, 2019.

== Composition ==
"Tusa" is a reggaeton song that is three minutes and 20 seconds in length. It was written by the two artists alongside Keityn and Ovy on the Drums, with production being handled by the latter. Lyrically, Karol G's verses tell the story of a woman who struggles to forget her former boyfriend, while Minaj's rap tells the man that the woman has moved on with her life.

The word tusa is Colombian slang for someone's heartache and feeling of incapability to overcome their ex-partner, accompanied by a desire for revenge. A person affected by this feeling is described as entusado/entusada.

Karol G explained how the song came to be: "I took the initiative to reach out that I wanted to write a song with her, and she loved the idea. When the opportunity came to work with Nicki, it wasn't something I wasn't looking for at the time, destiny gave me that surprise. I had a list of English speaking artists that I always wanted to work with, but I felt that Nicki Minaj was still on a higher level to which I had to work a little bit more."

In an interview with Billboard Giraldo revealed how Nicki Minaj's verse came to be:

She called me and said: "I'm going to make the best rap of my life for your song", I felt so happy. I sent her the music at 1 p.m. At 1:07 p.m., she downloaded the file, and at 8 p.m., I had the song back.

At a Pollstar conference, Minaj spoke on her part on "Tusa", stating: "She had sent me another song, and she really loved it, and I tried to write to it but I couldn't, and instead of brushing her off, [I] finally was like 'You know what, I love you, but I don't like this song. Could you send me something else?' And she sent me 'Tusa'."

== Commercial performance ==
In the United States, "Tusa" debuted at number one on the Hot Latin Songs, becoming the first song by two lead female artists to debut atop the chart, and also the first song by a female act in a lead role to chart at number one since 2016, when Shakira's "Chantaje" featuring Maluma reached the top. It became Minaj's sixth entry on the Hot Latin Songs chart, and her second top 10, following 2017's "Krippy Kush" remix with Farruko, Bad Bunny, 21 Savage and Rvssian.

On the US Billboard Hot 100, the song debuted at number 78, and later peaked at number 42. "Tusa" also debuted at 56 and later peaked at number 41 on the Rolling Stone US Top 100 Songs chart on the week ending 30 January 2020, with 67,200 sales plus track-equivalent streams. The song peaked at number one in numerous other countries. The song is the longest-running number one single on the Argentina Hot 100, spending 25 weeks on the top of the chart.

In 2022, the single became highest certified song in Mexico (AMPROFON), and the second-highest certified song by a female collaboration by the Latin division of the Recording Industry Association of America (RIAA), after "Mayores".

The song became the longest running number one single on the Argentina Hot 100, spending 25 consecutive weeks atop the charts. The song passed one billion streams on Spotify.

== Awards and nominations ==
Award and nominations for "Tusa"
Year	Ceremony	Award	Result
2020	American Music Awards	Favorite Song - Latin	Won
2020	Heat Latin Music Awards	Best Video	Won
2020	Latin Grammy Awards	Record of the Year	Nominated
2020	Latin Grammy Awards	Song of the Year	Nominated
2020	Latino Music Awards	Song of the Year	Nominated
2020	Latino Music Awards	Best Urban Song	Won
2020	LOS40 Music Awards 2020	Best Latin Song	Nominated
2020	LOS40 Music Awards 2020	Best Latin Video	Won
2020	MTV Europe Music Awards	Best Collaboration	Won
2020	MTV Europe Music Awards	Best Video	Nominated
2020	MTV Video Music Awards	Best Collaboration	Nominated
2020	MTV Video Music Awards	Best Latin	Nominated
2020	NRJ Music Awards	International Song of the Year	Nominated
2020	NRJ Music Awards	International Duo/Group of the Year	Nominated
2020	Premios Juventud	La Más Pegajosa (Can't Get Enough of this Song)	Won
2020	Premios Nuestra Tierra	Song of the Year	Won
2020	Premios Nuestra Tierra	Public's Favorite Song	Won
2020	Premios Nuestra Tierra	Urban Song	Won
2020	Premios Nuestra Tierra	Best Video	Nominated
2020	Premios Tu Música Urbano	Female Song	Nominated
2020	Spotify Awards	The Monday Song	Won
2021	Billboard Latin Music Awards	Hot Latin Song of the Year	Nominated
2021	Billboard Latin Music Awards	Vocal Event Hot Latin Song of the Year	Nominated
2021	Billboard Latin Music Awards	Airplay Song of the Year	Nominated
2021	Billboard Latin Music Awards	Sales Song of the Year	Nominated
2021	Billboard Latin Music Awards	Latin Rhythm Song of the Year	Nominated
2021	El Premio ASCAP	Song of the Year	Won
2021	El Premio ASCAP	Award Winning Song	Won
2021	iHeartRadio Music Awards	Latin Pop/Reggaeton Song of the Year	Won
2021	Latin American Music Awards	Song of the Year	Won
2021	Latin American Music Awards	Collaboration of the Year	Won
2021	Latin American Music Awards	Song of the Year - Urban	Won
2021	Lo Nuestro Awards	Crossover Collaboration Of The Year	Nominated
2021	Lo Nuestro Awards	Song of the Year	Won
2021	Lo Nuestro Awards	Urban - Collaboration Of The Year	Won
2021	Lo Nuestro Awards	Urban - Song Of The Year	Nominated
2021	Spotify Plaques	One Billion Streams Award	Won
2022	BMI Latin Awards	Award Winning Song	Won

== Music video ==
The music video for "Tusa" was directed by Mike Ho and was released on Karol G's YouTube channel on November 7, 2019.

== Live performances ==
On December 8, 2019, Karol G premiered "Tusa" at Pixel 4's Motion Sense Concert Series. Karol G performed the song on The Tonight Show Starring Jimmy Fallon on January 10, 2020. On November 19, 2020, Giraldo performed the song at the 21st Annual Latin Grammy Awards. On February 19, 2023, Karol G was the headlining act for Viña Del Mar International Song Festival, where "Tusa" was performed. "Tusa" has been present on the set list of all of Karol G's solo headlining tours, including the Bichota Tour, Strip Love Tour and the Mañana Será Bonito Tour. Nicki Minaj performed "Tusa" multiple times during the Pink Friday 2 World Tour, although it was not present on the main set list.

== Charts ==
=== Weekly charts ===
Chart (2019–2020)	Peak position
Argentina Hot 100 (Billboard)	1
Belgium (Ultratip Bubbling Under Flanders)	7
Belgium (Ultratop 50 Wallonia)	31
Bolivia (Monitor Latino)	1
Canada Hot 100 (Billboard)	98
Chile (Monitor Latino)	1
Colombia (National-Report)	1
Costa Rica (Monitor Latino)	1
Dominican Republic (SODINPRO)	1
Ecuador (National-Report)	1
El Salvador (Monitor Latino)	1
France (SNEP)	6
Germany (GfK)	79
Global 200 (Billboard)	109
Greece (IFPI)	69
Guatemala (Monitor Latino)	1
Honduras (Monitor Latino)	1
Italy (FIMI)	10
Latin America (Monitor Latino)	1
Mexico (Billboard Mexican Airplay)	3
Netherlands (Dutch Tipparade 40)	13
Netherlands (Single Tip)	1
Nicaragua (Monitor Latino)	1
Panama (Monitor Latino)	1
Paraguay (Monitor Latino)	1
Peru (Monitor Latino)	1
Portugal (AFP)	5
Puerto Rico (Monitor Latino)	1
Romania (Airplay 100)	57
Slovenia (SloTop50)	50
Spain (Promusicae)	1
Sweden Heatseeker (Sverigetopplistan)	6
Switzerland (Schweizer Hitparade)	8
Uruguay (Monitor Latino)	1
US Billboard Hot 100	42
US Hot Latin Songs (Billboard)	1
US Latin Airplay (Billboard)	1
US Latin Pop Airplay (Billboard)	1
US Latin Rhythm Airplay (Billboard)	1
US Rhythmic Airplay (Billboard)	16
US Rolling Stone Top 100	42
Venezuela Airplay (Monitor Latino)	1

=== Monthly charts ===
Chart (2020)	Position
Paraguay (SGP)	1

=== Year-end charts ===
Chart (2020)	Position
Argentina Airplay (Monitor Latino)	1
Belgium (Ultratop Wallonia)	57
Bolivia (Monitor Latino)	1
Colombia Airplay (Monitor Latino)	2
Costa Rica (Monitor Latino)	1
Dominican Republic (Monitor Latino)	4
Ecuador (Monitor Latino)	1
El Salvador (Monitor Latino)	1
El Salvador (ASAP EGC)	1
France (SNEP)	17
Guatemala (Monitor Latino)	1
Honduras (Monitor Latino)	1
Italy (FIMI)	29
Latin America (Monitor Latino)	1
Nicaragua (Monitor Latino)	3
Panama (Monitor Latino)	1
Paraguay (Monitor Latino)	1
Peru (Monitor Latino)	6
Puerto Rico (Monitor Latino)	5
Spain (PROMUSICAE)	1
Switzerland (Schweizer Hitparade)	13
Uruguay (Monitor Latino)	1
US Hot Latin Songs (Billboard)	2
Venezuela Airplay (Monitor Latino)	1

Chart (2021)	Position
Panama (Monitor Latino)	35
Peru (Monitor Latino)	83
Portugal (AFP)	168

== Certifications ==
Region	Certification	Certified units/sales
Argentina (CAPIF)	4× Platinum	80,000^{*}
Belgium (BRMA)	Gold	20,000^{‡}
Brazil (Pro-Música Brasil)	3× Diamond	480,000^{‡}
Canada (Music Canada)	2× Platinum	160,000^{‡}
France (SNEP)	Diamond	333,333^{‡}
Germany (BVMI)	Platinum	400,000^{‡}
Italy (FIMI)	2× Platinum	140,000^{‡}
Mexico (AMPROFON)	21× Diamond+3× Platinum+Gold	6,510,000^{‡}
New Zealand (RMNZ)	Gold	15,000^{‡}
Poland (ZPAV)	Platinum	20,000^{‡}
Portugal (AFP)	5× Platinum	50,000^{‡}
Spain (Promusicae)	9× Platinum	360,000^{‡}
United Kingdom (BPI)	Silver	200,000^{‡}
United States (RIAA)	41× Platinum (Latin)	2,460,000^{‡}
Streaming
Central America (CFC)	Diamond	35,000,000^{†}
^{*} Sales figures based on certification alone.^{‡} Sales+streaming figures based on certification alone.^{†} Streaming-only figures based on certification alone.

== Release history ==
Region	Date	Format(s)	Label	Ref.
Various	November 7, 2019	Digital download; streaming	Universal Latino; Republic	
Italy	December 13, 2019	Contemporary hit radio	Universal	
United States	February 11, 2020	Contemporary hit radio	Universal Latino; Republic	
Various	December 6, 2024	7-inch vinyl	Universal Latino	

== See also ==
- List of best-selling singles in Mexico
- List of best-selling singles in Spain
- List of Billboard Hot Latin Songs and Latin Airplay number ones of 2020
- RIAA certification
