= Mariah Angeliq =

American singer

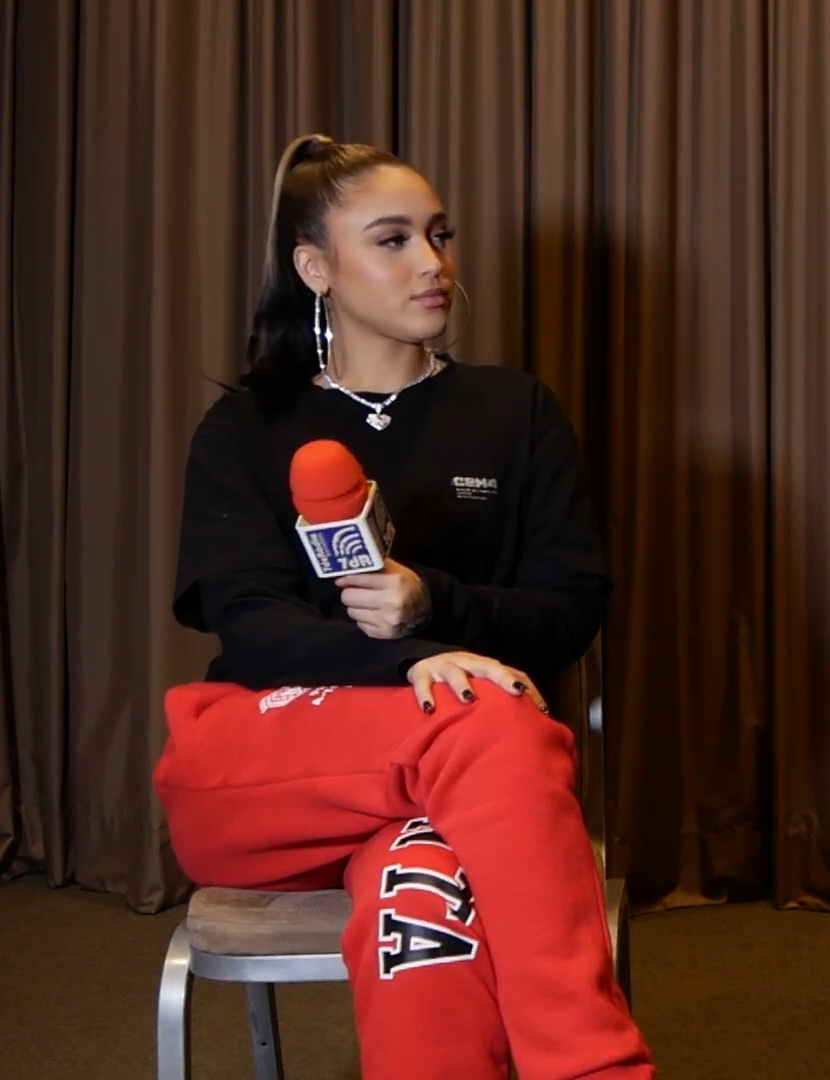
- Angeliq in 2021

Background information
- Born: Mariah Angelique Pérez; August 7, 1999 (age 27); Miami, Florida, U.S.
- Genres: Latin trap; reggaeton
- Occupation: Singer
- Years active: 2018–present
- Labels: Gold Star; Machete; Universal Latino

Mariah Angelique Pérez (born August 7, 1999), known professionally as Mariah Angeliq, is an American singer.

== Early life ==
Angeliq was born Mariah Angelique Pérez in Miami, Florida, to a Cuban father and Puerto Rican mother. She was named after Mariah Carey, she and her mother's favorite singer. Her first language was Spanish, but she quickly learned English when she was enrolled in school in New Jersey.

== Career ==
Mariah Angeliq began writing music at the age of 16, and ran away from her home to follow her music career. She crossed paths with reggaetón producer Nely, who guided her as a young artist and helped introduce Spanish music and lyrics into her repertoire. She signed with Gold Star Music in 2018 and she signed under Universal Music Latin. She released her first single "Blah" on June 28, 2018. On July 31, 2020, Angeliq released her first EP, Normal. In June 2020, she participated with Italian singer Elodie and the Gipsy Kings in the summer hit "Ciclone", by Italian record producers Takagi & Ketra. Angeliq released a single with J Álvarez and Marie Monti titled "Billete" on March 5, 2021.

Angeliq was a featured artist on Colombian singer Karol G's #1 hit album KG0516 (2021), singing a duet on the track "El Makinon". The two would go on to perform the song live at the Premios Lo Nuestro awards show in April 2021. They also filmed a provocative music video for the song on the streets of New York City, the two singers depicting a modern-day "Thelma and Louise" by portraying the lives of two female criminals. "El Makinon", as a single, undoubtedly became one of Angeliq's, and Karol G's, most successful musical ventures to date: since the video was uploaded to YouTube in March 2021, it has amassed 962 million views and 4.7 million 'likes' on the platform, as of July 2023. Reggaeton legend Ivy Queen is Angeliq's musical idol.

== Personal life ==
Angeliq was reported to be dating actor Max Ehrich in November 2020. As of May 2021, she was romantically involved with actor and musician Roshon Fegan.

== Discography ==
- Normal (2020)
- La Tóxica (2021)

== Awards and nominations ==
Year	Award	Category	Result
2020	Lo Nuestro Awards	Female Breakthrough Artist	Nominated
2020	Premios Juventud	The New Generation (Female)	Nominated
