= Alberto Stylee =

Puerto Rican musician

- Also known as: El Cantante del Barrio; El Dueño del Estilo
- Born: Carlos Alberto Pizarro; Río Piedras, Puerto Rico
- Genre: Reggaeton
- Occupations: Singer; songwriter
- Instrument: Vocals
- Years active: 1995–present
- Website: albertostylee.net

Carlos Alberto Pizarro, known professionally as Alberto Stylee, is a Puerto Rican reggaetón singer and songwriter. While his career began with hip-hop and reggae-influenced music, he is most famous for being one of the early pioneers of the reggaetón genre, with hits such as "Posición" with Daddy Yankee (1997), "Vengo Acabando" (1997), "Perros y Gatos" (2002), "Sin Ti No Puedo Vivir" with Nicky Jam (2004), "Te Imagino" (2012) and "Perdona" (2014).

== Early life ==
Alberto Stylee began his career in 1995, participating in various dance and hip hop improvisation competitions. According to Alberto, for the first five years of his career he was afraid to perform in public. He never imagined the improvisations he performed would be discovered by radio and television.

As Alberto Stylee rose to fame in the late '90s, he recorded for top DJ's including DJ Blass, Luny Tunes, DJ Barbosa and others. Alberto Stylee's distinctive style and voice propelled him to success early in his career, opening the doors to collaborations with J Alvarez ("Te Imagino"), Daddy Yankee ("Letra de Posición"), Ñejo & Dalmata ("Vamos Pa' La Disco"), and Cheka ("Poca Ropa") and his participation in various compilation albums including Playero 39 with DJ Playero.

In 1998, Alberto released his first solo production entitled "Exclusivo", which was nominated in the category of best "Rap and Reggae Album of the Year" in the "Premio Tu Música" (Your Music Awards). For two consecutive years, Alberto Stylee was selected as the Artist of the Year in the National Day of Rap and Reggae ("Día Nacional del Rap y Reggae") Awards in 1998 and 1999. In 2000, he released "Love Reggae Jams", an album that served as a bridge to his later career in reggaeton with a new rhythm that integrated romantic ballads with reggae and hip hop music.

== Reggaeton career ==
Alberto Stylee's fame and success, however, was derived from his entry into the genre of reggaeton. In 2002, Alberto Stylee launched his third album titled "Los Dueños de la Disco", collaborating with musical artists such as Nicky Jam, Daddy Yankee, Maicol & Manuel, and Plan B (duo). The use of various artists and DJs in the album created a unique flavor that combined a variety of different styles and voices.

In 2003, Alberto Stylee left his native Puerto Rico to expand his career in the United States, settling upon Miami, Florida and signing a musical contract with Univibe Records. In 2004, he launched his fourth album and his second in the reggaeton genre, "Rebuleando Con Estilo". The album served to cement Alberto Stylee as a prominent reggaeton artist and featured collaborations with fellow Puerto Rican reggaeton stars such as Nicky Jam, and Zion & Lennox.

As Alberto Stylee's career progressed, his focus pivoted to audiences in Latin America. In 2007, the artist left Miami to live in Medellín, Colombia and join the emerging music scene in the city that has produced some of the world's best reggaeton artists including J Balvin, Reykon, Maluma and others. Alberto cited Medellín's culture and renowned beautiful women as his reasons for relocating to the city.

== Legal history ==
On June 2, 2012, Alberto Stylee was detained by Colombian authorities in Medellín, Colombia and later charged with attempted murder and the illegal possession of a firearm in connection with a shooting that took place on February 26, 2012 in a farmhouse in Copacabana, Antioquia. According to witnesses the victim, Edwin Alfredo Henao Moná, was shot multiple times during a party that featured multiple reggaeton artists and local celebrities.

According to the victim, Alberto Stylee fell into a jealous rage after Mr. Henao spoke to a woman attending the party. When Alberto approached and aimed his gun, Mr. Henao allegedly pleaded for his life saying, "Please don't shoot me. I have a son".

Alberto Stylee, who was attending the party to perform, has been consistent in his denial of the accusations, claiming that there were never ballistic tests and the clothing he wore on the day of the party did not match the clothing described by the victim.

Mr. Henao died two years later, on May 27, 2014, due to complications resulting from his injuries.

On October 30, 2012, Alberto Stylee was released from Colombia's Bellavista prison by the circuit court of Bello, Antioquia citing insufficient and conflicting evidence in the case. Alberto Stylee would later release a song titled Bella Bella, which touches on his experiences while incarcerated in the Bellavista prison. The video rendition of that single had more than 4.3 million views on YouTube as of November 2014.

On February 17, 2016, the Tribunal Superior of Medellin revoked the prior acquittal from the circuit court of Bello, Antioquia and issued a warrant for Alberto Stylee's immediate arrest, ordering him to serve an additional 12 years in prison on charges of attempted murder and illegal possession of weapons. However, prior to his capture, the singer fled to the United States where he continues to maintain his innocence.

== Resurgence ==
Since his release from prison, Alberto Stylee's career has seen a resurgence. Under the guidance of manager and friend Christian Hernandez, Alberto Stylee released three new singles in 2014 including Me Enamoré, and Manifiestate and Llamada Perdida.

On July 9, 2014, Alberto Stylee signed a multiyear contract with Míguelo Romano, a men's designer clothing brand based in Brooklyn, New York that produces a line of high fashion, armored clothing. This sponsorship contract included performances at Medellín's Luxury Nightclub during Míguelo Romano's annual fashion show alongside hip hop sensation Radio MC. Alberto Stylee performed the concert while wearing a bulletproof urban hoodie.

== Discography ==
=== Studio albums ===
- Exclusivo (1998)
- Los Dueños de la Disco (2002)
- Rebuleando con Estilo (2004)

=== Collaborative albums ===
- Inmortal (2020) (con DJ Nelson)

=== Compilation albums ===
- Reggae Love Jams (2000)
- El Que Los Puso a Entonar (2012)
