= Sejodioto =

2021 single by Karol G

Single by Karol G
- Language: Spanish
- English title: Everything Got Screwed
- Released: September 21, 2021
- Genre: Reggaeton
- Length: 3:00
- Label: Universal Music Latino
- Songwriters: Carolina Giraldo; Justin Quiles; Lenny Tavárez; Cristian Salazar; Ovy on the Drums
- Producer: Ovy on the Drums

Karol G singles chronology
"Don't Be Shy" (2021)	"Sejodioto" (2021)	"No Te Deseo El Mal" (2021)

Music video
- "Sejodioto" on YouTube

"Sejodioto" (Spanish, agglutination for se jodido todo or se jodío' to, meaning "everything was screwed", or "it’s all f*cked-up"; stylized in all caps) is a song by Colombian singer-songwriter Karol G which was released on September 21, 2021, through Universal Music Latino. "Sejodioto" was written by Karol G, J Quiles, Lenny Tavárez, Cristián Salazar, and producer Ovy on the Drums, who also produced the track.

== Background ==
The release was announced just hours prior to its official launch, on September 21, 2021, through Karol G's social media accounts. It was released that same day.

"Sejodioto" is an acronym or an agglutination for se jodío’ to’, itself a shortened version of se ha jodido todo, meaning "everything got screwed" or "it’s all f*cked-up".

== Critical reception ==
Billboard stated: "The track is an infectious hard-hitting reggeaton fused with Karol's melodious voice and a distinct clock-ticking sound. In true Karol G fashion, "Sejodioto" is a female anthem about a woman who's enjoying every second of her freedom without commitments."

== Commercial performance ==
"Sejodioto" debuted at number 42 on the US Billboard Hot Latin Songs chart dated October 2, 2021. On its nineteenth week, the song entered the top 15. On its twentieth week, the song entered the top 10 and reached its final peak at number 9 on the chart dated February 12, 2022.

== Music video ==
The music video for "Sejodioto" was directed by Colin Tilley and was released on Karol G's YouTube channel on September 21, 2021.

== Charts ==
=== Weekly charts ===
Weekly chart performance for "Sejodioto"
Chart (2021)	Peak position
Argentina Hot 100 (Billboard)	40
Peru (Billboard)	19
Spain (PROMUSICAE)	42
US Bubbling Under Hot 100 (Billboard)	8
US Hot Latin Songs (Billboard)	9
US Latin Airplay (Billboard)	1
US Latin Rhythm Airplay (Billboard)	1

=== Year-end charts ===
Year-end chart performance for "Sejodioto"
Chart (2022)	Position
US Hot Latin Songs (Billboard)	48

== Certifications ==
Certifications for "Sejodioto"
Region	Certification	Certified units/sales
Argentina (CAPIF)	Gold	
Spain (Promusicae)	Platinum	60,000^{‡}
Streaming
Central America (CFC)	Platinum	7,000,000^{†}
^{‡} Sales+streaming figures based on certification alone.^{†} Streaming-only figures based on certification alone.

== See also ==
- List of Billboard Hot Latin Songs and Latin Airplay number ones of 2022
