= Karol G =

Colombian singer-songwriter (born 1991)

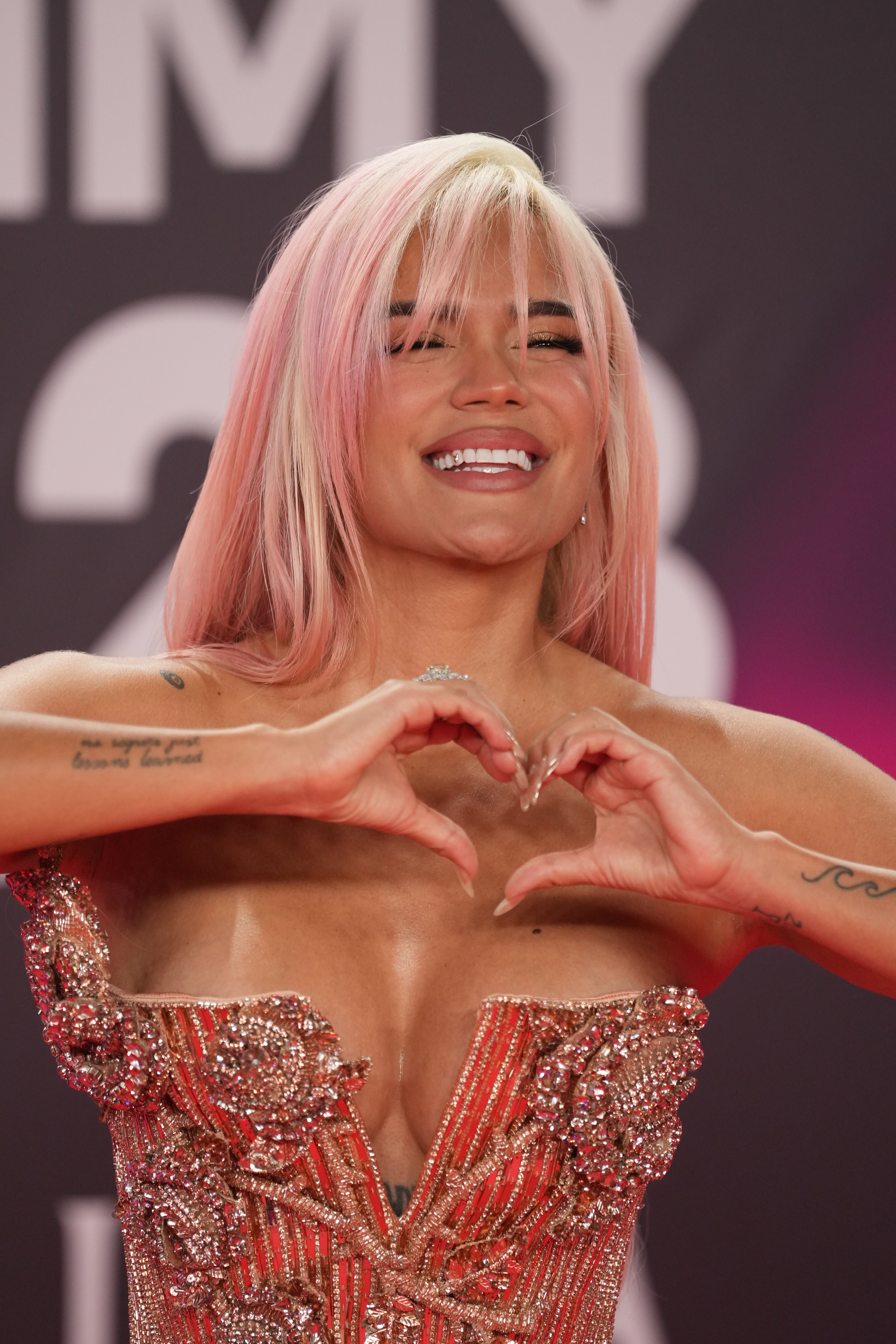
- Karol G at the 2023 Latin Grammy Awards
- Born: Carolina Giraldo Navarro; 14 February 1991 (age 35); Medellín, Antioquia, Colombia
- Occupations: Singer; songwriter
- Years active: 2007–present
- Works: Discography; songs recorded
- Awards: Full list
- Musical career
- Genres: Reggaeton; urban pop; Latin R&B
- Labels: Universal Latino; Bichota; Interscope; Rimas
- Website: shopkarolg.com (in Spanish and English)

Carolina Giraldo Navarro (born 14 February 1991), known professionally as Karol G, is a Colombian singer-songwriter. She is considered one of the most influential reggaeton and urban pop artists. Her accolades include a Grammy Award, ten Latin Grammy Awards (including Album of the Year, Song of the Year and Best New Artist) and five Billboard Music Awards. She was recognised as Woman of the Year and received the Rulebreaker Award at the Billboard Women in Music Awards 2024 ceremony, and has also achieved eleven Guinness World Records.

Born and raised in Medellín, Colombia, Giraldo launched her career as a teenager, appearing on the Colombian spinoff of The X Factor. She moved to New York in 2014 to learn more about the music industry and signed with Universal Music Latino. In late 2018, her duet "Secreto" became a hit in Latin America, as she and Puerto Rican artist Anuel AA publicly confirmed their relationship via its music video.

In July 2019, she released "China" in collaboration with Anuel AA, Daddy Yankee, Ozuna, and J Balvin, which became her first music video with over one billion views on YouTube. In May 2019, she released the album Ocean, which served as a stylistic departure from Unstoppable, incorporating a more relaxed and less "pop" sound while incorporating reggaetón influences. Popular singles from the album included the title track (later released as a remix with Jessie Reyez). Later that year, her song "Tusa" charted internationally and was certified 28× Latin platinum by the RIAA. In 2020, Giraldo received four nominations at the Latin Grammy Awards. Throughout the COVID-19 pandemic, she would release successful songs, including some of her most famous ("Ay, Dios Mío!", "Bichota" and "Location"), in the lead-up to her third album, KG0516, which was released in spring of 2021 and topped the US Latin albums chart.

Giraldo released her fourth album, Mañana Será Bonito, in the spring of 2023; the record was the first Spanish-language album by a female artist to debut at No. 1 on the US Billboard 200. She achieved her first top-ten single on the US Billboard Hot 100 with the song "TQG", a collaboration with fellow Colombian singer-songwriter Shakira, reaching the No. 7 position. In early 2024, she received her first Grammy Award, at the 66th annual ceremony, for the recently created Música Urbana Album category. Between 2025 and 2026, she released her fifth and sixth studio albums, Tropicoqueta and No Me Arrepiento de Sentir Tanto, with hits such as "Si Antes Te Hubiera Conocido" and "Bby Wow".

== Early life ==
Carolina Giraldo Navarro was born on 14 February 1991 in Medellín, the youngest of three children. At age 14, she appeared on El Factor X. Giraldo posted covers of songs by Alicia Keys and Lauryn Hill on YouTube, in hopes of being discovered like Justin Bieber. Ultimately, she obtained her first record contract with Flamingo Records (Colombia) and Diamond Music (Puerto Rico) and chose "Karol G" as her artistic name. In her first year, she was invited by Kio Dj to open for Don Omar's concerts in the city of Cartagena. She performed with J Balvin at a quinceañera party soon after.

== Musical career ==
=== 2007–2016: Beginnings ===
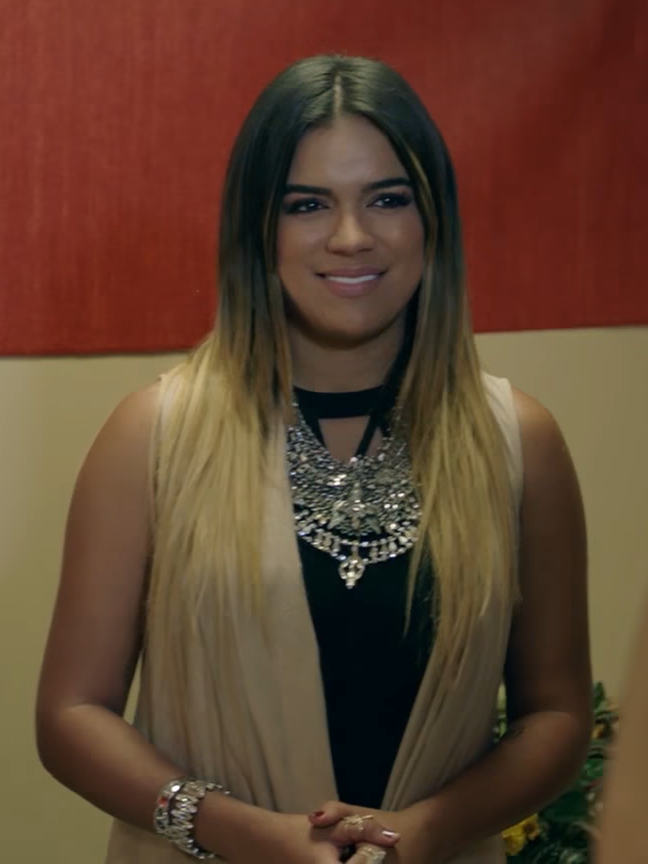
Karol G in 2016

In the following years, Giraldo recorded and released songs sporadically, including "En la Playa" (On the beach) in 2007, "Por Ti" (For you) in 2008, "Dime Que Sí" (Say yes) in 2009 and "Mil Maneras" (A thousand ways) in 2010. She studied music at the University of Antioquia and sang backup for other artists during her studies, including Reykon, recording the songs "Tu Juguete" (Your toy) in 2011 and "301" in 2012. Shortly after, she travelled to Miami to meet with Universal Records, who declined to sign her at the time, insinuating that a woman would not be successful in the reggaetón genre.

In response to Universal Music's rejection, Giraldo and her father decided to promote her career independently, touring domestically across Colombia at colleges, clubs, and festivals. She recalled, "I always said that if we'd made money per miles, we'd be millionaires. It was a long process... and because of it, I can truly enjoy what's happening now." The increased publicity through these tours led to her 2013 collaboration with Nicky Jam on the song "Amor de Dos" (Love of two).

However, finding that her music career was not progressing fast enough in South America, a disillusioned Giraldo moved to New York in 2014 to work and stay with her aunt. Feeling somewhat lost over her lack of success at the time, she later said that when taking the NYC Subway each day to and from work, she would see various advertisements offering educational courses and certifications for the music business. Taking this as a sign, Giraldo eventually decided to enroll in music business administration classes. The decision helped reinvigorate her passion for music, motivating her to continue furthering her career. Her 2014 dancehall song "Ricos Besos" (Sweet kisses) became a hit in Colombia. In 2016, she signed with Universal Music Latino. During that year, she released the singles "Casi Nada" (Next to nothing), "Hello" with then-rising star Ozuna, and "Muñeco de Lego" (Lego minifigure) as lead-ups to her album release. In November 2024, Karol G released the single "+57," a collaboration featuring fellow Colombian artists Feid, J Balvin, Maluma, Ryan Castro, Blessd, and producer Ovy on the Drums. The title references Colombia's international dialling code. The track achieved significant chart success, reaching number one on Billboard's Latin Airplay chart and number four on the Hot Latin Songs chart.

=== 2017–2018: Breakthrough success and Unstoppable ===
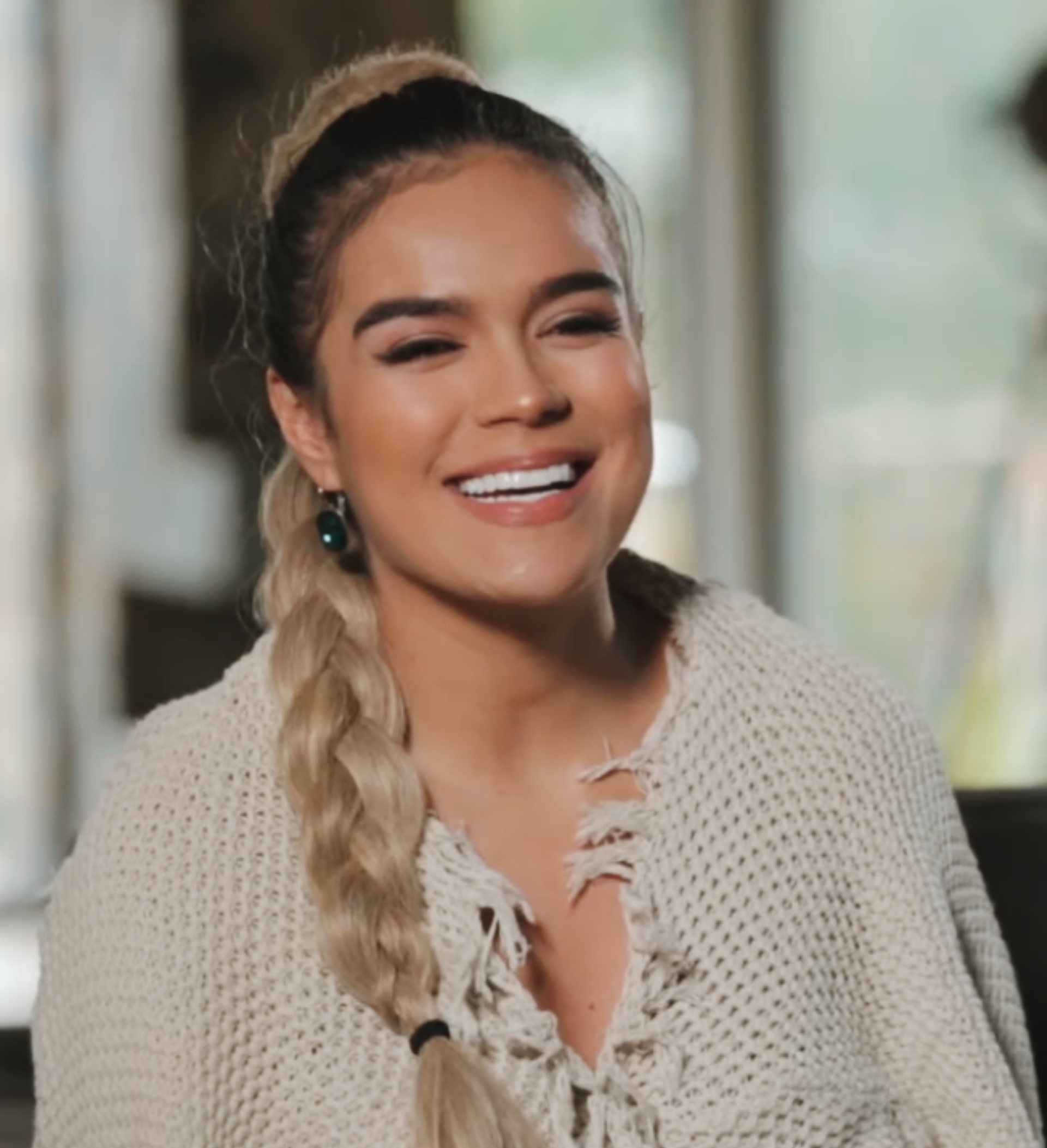
Karol G in 2018

In January 2017, Karol G joined the reality talent show Pequeños Gigantes USA (Little giants USA) as a judge, offering advice to children 6–11 years of age who performed on the show. In February, she released the break-up song "A Ella" (To her), a song inspired by real-life events. In May, her collaboration with Puerto Rican trap artist Bad Bunny, "Ahora Me Llama" (Now he calls me) became her breakthrough hit. The video garnered more than one billion views on YouTube and reached No. 10 on the Billboard Hot Latin Songs chart. The song was described by Marty Preciado of NPR as a "bass-heavy, unapologetic trap anthem to the power of femininity, soiled in hi-hats and heavy sub-bass [that] challenges hegemonic masculinity, singing about respect, love and sex-positive decisions." According to Ecleen Luzmila Caraballo of Rolling Stone, "it was then that Giraldo joined the increasingly-global pop urbano wave and established herself as one of its most standout acts".

"Ahora Me Llama" served as the main single (including a remix featuring Quavo from Migos) for her debut studio album, Unstoppable; the record also contained the three aforementioned singles, and was released in October 2017, debuting at No. 2 on the Billboard Top Latin Albums chart. Thom Jurek of AllMusic called Unstoppable "the first solid entry by a woman in the Latin trap movement". In March 2018, the singer released the jungle-inspired music video for her single "Pineapple". In that same month, she was announced as a nominee for the Billboard Latin Music Awards' Top Female Artist of the Year.

On 6 April 2018, Karol G collaborated with Argentine singer and songwriter Tini on the song "Princesa", from Tini's second studio album Quiero Volver.

In May 2018, she released "Mi Cama" (My bed), which became a commercial success. This was followed by "Culpables" (Guilty ones), featuring Puerto Rican rapper (and eventual partner) Anuel AA. "Culpables" peaked at No. 8 on the Billboard Hot Latin Songs chart, and a remix of "Mi Cama", featuring her early collaborators J Balvin and Nicky Jam, peaked at No. 6 on the same chart.

=== 2019–2021: Ocean and KG0516 ===
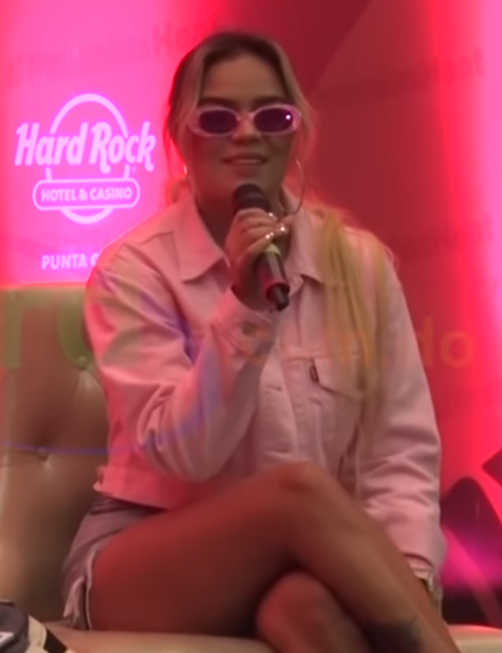
Karol G in 2019

In January 2019, the singer released the single "Secreto" (Secret) with Puerto Rican rapper Anuel AA; the song's accompanying music video confirmed the rumoured romantic relationship between the two artists. The single reached No. 68 on the Billboard Hot 100 and No. 5 on the US Hot Latin Songs charts. The song was inspired by the period of time in which Anuel AA and Karol G were dating but had not yet publicly discussed their relationship. The video's "power couple" aesthetic garnered comparisons to Beyoncé and Jay-Z, as well as Jennifer Lopez and Marc Anthony. Karol released the album Ocean on 3 May 2019. The album was inspired by a moment of peace and relaxation she experienced at the beach on the Spanish Canary Island of Tenerife; she travelled to the beaches of the Turks and Caicos Islands, as well as Saint Martin, to draw further inspiration for the album. Elias Leight of Rolling Stone reviewed the album by stating, "The power of Ocean is somewhat diminished by the fact that a third of these songs are already out" but opined that "the remaining tracks are impressively varied".

In July 2019, Karol G collaborated with Anuel AA, Daddy Yankee, Ozuna and J Balvin for the song "China". The song samples, and is based on, singer Shaggy's 2000 hit, "It Wasn't Me". "China" debuted at No. 2 on Billboard's Hot Latin Songs chart on the issue dated 3 August 2019, and topped both the Latin Digital Songs and Latin Streaming Songs charts with 1,000 downloads sold and 14.1 million streams. "China" was included on the Rolling Stone list of the 10 Best Latin Music Videos of July. Karol G released "Tusa", the first single from her album KG0516, on 7 November 2019. Tusa, a reggaeton song featuring Nicki Minaj, became a commercial success, eventually being nominated for Record of the Year and Song of the Year at the 21st Annual Latin Grammy Awards. Karol G premiered the song on American television on The Tonight Show Starring Jimmy Fallon on 10 January 2020. The song reached No. 1 on the Billboard Hot Latin Songs chart on 23 November 2019 and stayed on the chart for 25 weeks.

In April 2020, Karol G released the single and video for "Follow" with Anuel AA, recording its entirety while in quarantine in Miami due to the COVID-19 pandemic. She also collaborated with the Jonas Brothers on the "flirtatious" song "X" which first appeared in the end credits of the group's documentary film Happiness Continues. Karol G and the Jonas Brothers filmed the song's accompanying music video on their iPhones, using the combined footage as a "clever way to get around the obvious challenge of trying to film a music video during the COVID-19 crisis". In October, "Bichota" was released as the album's official lead single, becoming viral online.

On 17 March 2021, Karol G announced the release of her upcoming album as well as its release date and cover art through a half-minute video. The tracklist was announced on 22 March, and on 26 March, KG0516 was released. Karol G released "Sejodioto" on 21 September 2021. In October 2021, Karol G teamed up with Smirnoff for their "Sabor for the People" campaign. As part of the deal, her Bichota Tour was presented by Smirnoff.

=== 2023–2025: Mañana Será Bonito and Tropicoqueta ===
On 14 February 2022, Karol G and Crocs announced a partnership by unveiling two different shoe silhouettes. In April 2022, "Provenza" was released as the lead single of the then unannounced album, Mañana Será Bonito, The song became a commercial success and was nominated for both Record and Song of the Year at the 23rd Annual Latin Grammy Awards. The title refers to a neighbourhood of Medellín called Provenza. In August 2022 Karol G released "Gatúbela" alongside Puerto Rican rapper Maldy from Reggaeton duo Plan B. The song features a beat characteristic of old-school, 2000s reggaetón, with a dembow rhythm. Its music video was initially banned online in certain countries for being sexually provocative, though it was later made available as no actual nudity is seen. The video also takes some inspiration from older horror movies (as her prowling cat-woman character can be seen covered in blood at the end), and is the first to show off Karol G's dyed red hair.

On 19 February 2023, Karol G was among the headlining artists at the famous Viña del Mar International Song Festival in Viña del Mar/Valparaíso, Chile, where she performed a live-streamed show for over 15,000 fans. On 24 February, Karol G's album Mañana Será Bonito was released, alongside the collaboration "TQG" with Shakira. The album peaked at number one on the Billboard 200, becoming the first-ever Spanish-language album by a female artist to debut at No. 1, while the collaboration achieved her highest-charting single on the Billboard Hot 100, peaking at seven. The project garnered seven nominations at the 24th Annual Latin Grammy Awards, winning three awards, including Album of the Year and Best Urban Music Album, while "TQG" won for Best Urban Fusion/Performance. This made Karol G the first woman to win the Latin Grammy Award for Best Urban Music Album. At the subsequent 66th Annual Grammy Awards the album won an award for Best Música Urbana Album, making her the first woman to win that award at the Grammys.

In June 2023, Karol G signed with Interscope Records. On 2 June 2023 Karol G released "Watati", a promotional single from Barbie the Album which featured the Panamanian reggaeton artist Aldo Ranks. The music video was released on 15 June 2023. Karol G released a song called "S91" on 13 July 2023, along with a music video directed by Pedro Artola. On 11 August 2023 Karol G released a companion mixtape to Mañana Será Bonito, called Mañana Será Bonito (Bichota Season). It includes lead single "S91" and a second single titled "Mi Ex Tenía Razón" released on the same day as its parent mixtape. The album includes collaborations with Peso Pluma, Kali Uchis, and Tiësto, among others.

In 2024 she became the first Latina named Woman of the Year at Billboard Women in Music. On 20 June 2024, she released her single, "Si Antes Te Hubiera Conocido", her venture into merengue. The song peaked at the top of the Hot Latin Songs chart and peaked at No. 32 on the Billboard Hot 100 and made the year-end list for 2024. The song also became the longest running No. 1 on the Latin Airplay chart, with a total of 27 weeks spent at the number-one position. Also in 2024, she appeared in a recurring role in the Netflix miniseries Griselda, starring Sofía Vergara. In August 2024, Karol G was added to Fortnite Battle Royale as an outfit, with an additional outfit being included in the Fortnite Festival Season Pass. She also received instruments, a limited-time in-game concert titled Mañana Será Bonito, and other themed content.

On 20 June 2025, she released her 5th album, Tropicoqueta, which features collaborations with famous artists like Feid and Greeicy. On 5 September 2025, Karol G performed at the halftime show of the National Football League's Brazil game. On 15 October, she appeared at the Victoria's Secret Fashion Show 2025, where she performed two songs from her album, Tropicoqueta, and walked the runway. Karol G was the first ever Colombian artist to perform, or walk for the Victoria Secret Fashion Show. In November 2025, Karol G and Puerto Rican producer Tainy released a song titled "Única".

=== 2026—present: No Me Arrepiento de Sentir Tanto ===
Karol G became the first Latin woman to headline Coachella, when she topped the bill at Coachella 2026 on 12 and 19 April 2026. Her set received critical acclaim. Mariah Angeliq, Becky G, and Wisin joined as special guests on the first weekend. On the same weekend, Greg Gonzalez of Cigarettes After Sex joined Karol G onstage to perform a new song together, "Después de Ti". Gonzalez provided the song's guitar instrumentation. They officially released the track onto streaming platforms on 23 April, earning 3.8 million streams in the United States within a week and debuting at number 94 on the US Billboard Hot 100, as well as debuting atop the US Hot Latin Pop Songs chart.

On 21 April 2026, Karol G announced her fourth solo concert tour, the Viajando Por El Mundo Tropitour. On 23 July 2026, a day before Giraldo embarked on the tour, "Matadora" was announced and was released the following day on 24 June 2026, coinciding with the start of the tour. On 29 July 2026, Karol G announced her sixth studio album, No Me Arrepiento de Sentir Tanto, and revealed that it would be released on 7 August 2026. The announcement took place during a concert at Rogers Stadium in Toronto, where Karol G revealed that she had spent the "past couple of months" "locked away" recording the album.

== Artistry ==
=== Influences ===
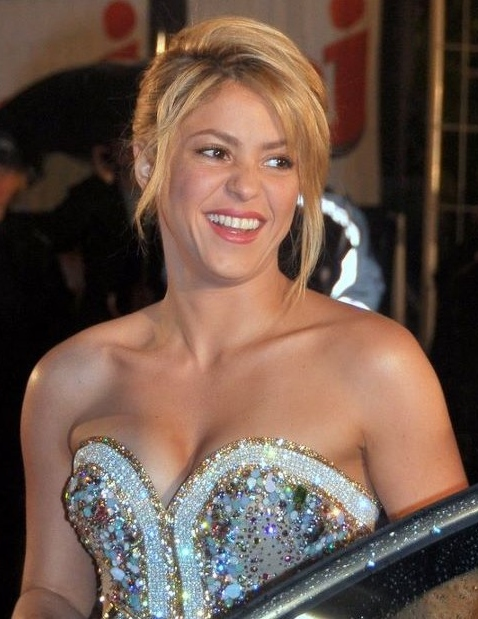
Karol G credits Latin artists such as Selena (left) and Shakira (right) as major influences.

Karol G cites the global appeal of singers Rihanna, Beyoncé, Selena and Shakira as major influences on her work and the level of global recognition she hopes to achieve, with Rihanna being a "dream" collaboration. She has been likened to Shakira in the media in regards to representing her country on the global stage. Karol G herself has expressed the desire to have the same global impact that Shakira has. Karol G has a tattoo of portraits of Rihanna and Quintanilla, along with herself, on her right forearm. Additional influences include Backstreet Boys, Christina Aguilera, Ivy Queen, Anahí, Thalía, Spice Girls, Jerry Rivera, Bee Gees, Red Hot Chili Peppers and RBD. She recalled having a childhood obsession with the hip-hop group G-Unit, which inspired her stage name.

=== Musical style ===
"Ahora Me Llama" (2017)
The single "Ahora Me Llama" served as Karol G's break-out hit and features elements of trap music.

"Tusa" (2019)
"Tusa" contains a more melodic style and lyrics about heartbreak.

Karol G's music has been described as predominantly reggaeton and Latin urban, with some Latin trap influences. However, she has experimented with a variety of other genres in her work. Her album Ocean features a wide range of stylistic experimentation. She collaborated with Brazilian duo Simone & Simaria on the Spanish/Portuguese song "La Vida Continuó", which contains influences from the genre of sertanejo. Her fourth album Tropicoqueta explores Colombian music genres such as cumbia, vallenato and salsa. Her lyrics often navigate themes of female empowerment, romance, heartbreak and resilience. Karol G's moniker and self-adapted on-stage alter-ego is "La Bichota", inspired by her song of the same name. Originally a slang term, she has said that she wanted to redefine the word to refer to an independent, powerful woman who is in control of her life.

== Public image ==
Ecleen Luzmila Caraballo of Rolling Stone described Karol G's style of dress as "feminine and sexy, yet sporty and tomboyish — but never [cutesy]". Gary Suarez of Vice notes that in her music videos, "she exudes a sex positivity that reflects a powerful diva image front and centre, rather than the eye candy tropes often found in urbano visuals." Karol G has a large LGBTQ following, and the singer has expressed admiration for her gay fans, saying "I love people who can go out into the world and be fearless...That's something I admire very much from that community. They have a beautiful energy." She declined to record "Sin Pijama" with Becky G, which would become a hit collaboration with Natti Natasha, because of a lyric about smoking marijuana. Karol G, who does not smoke marijuana, felt the song did not represent her true lifestyle. For her album Ocean, Karol G moved away from the polished image of the Unstoppable album cover, explaining, "I did the picture with no makeup, super natural. Because that's the way I want people to listen to my music now."

In 2020, Karol G's tweet about her dog's "perfect" colour, and citing it as an example of white and black looking beautiful together, sparked controversy. She later admitted to have acted in "an ignorant way" at a time when Black Lives Matter had gripped America in 2020, and stated she "lost a lot of opportunities" in an interview with The Guardian.

== Personal life ==
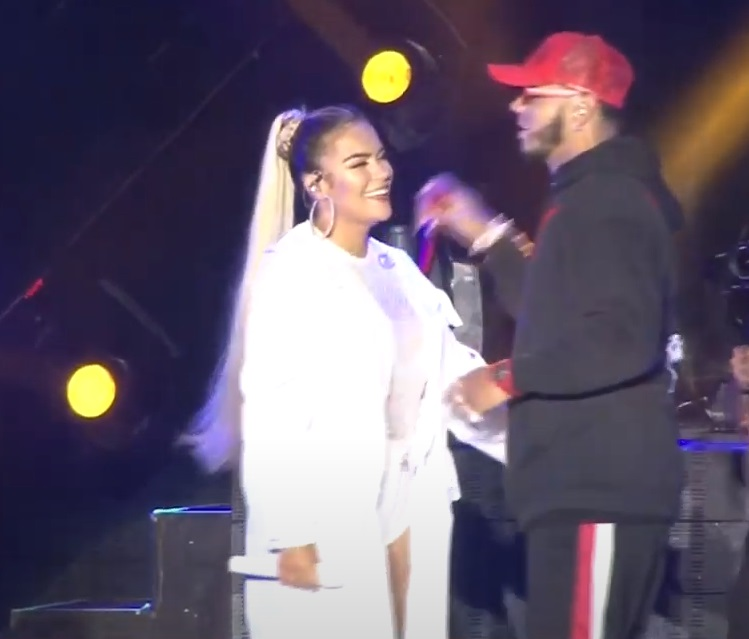
Anuel AA and Karol G in 2019

Karol G met Puerto Rican rapper Anuel AA in August 2018 on the set of the music video for their song "Culpables", a month after his release from prison. In January 2019, the couple announced their relationship. On 25 April 2019, Karol G publicised her engagement to the rapper by appearing at the Billboard Latin Music Awards wearing a diamond ring. On 20 April 2021, Anuel AA stated that he and Karol G had ended their relationship and engagement. As of early 2023, Karol G's relationship with Colombian musician Feid was shown after they attended the Billboard Women in Music 2024 event together. In April 2026, Karol G went on Call Her Daddy and confirmed the end of her relationship with Feid. She said that she was no longer happy in that relationship.

On 29 February 2024, Karol G's Gulfstream IV, en route from Hollywood Burbank Airport to El Salvador International Airport for her Mañana Será Bonito Tour, made an emergency landing at Van Nuys Airport due to a report from the pilot of smoke in the cockpit. All 16 passengers onboard the plane, including Karol G, were evacuated safely with no injuries.

== Discography ==
=== Studio albums ===
- Unstoppable (2017)
- Ocean (2019)
- KG0516 (2021)
- Mañana Será Bonito (2023)
- Tropicoqueta (2025)
- No Me Arrepiento de Sentir Tanto (2026)

== Filmography ==
- Koati (2021)
- Griselda (2024)
- Karol G: Tomorrow Was Beautiful (2025)

== Tours ==
Headlining

- Bichota Tour (2021–2022)
- Strip Love Tour (2022)
- Mañana Será Bonito Tour (2023–2024)
- Viajando Por El Mundo Tropitour (2026–2027)

Promotional

- Girl Power Tour (2017)

Co-headlining

- Culpables Tour (with Anuel AA) (2019)

Opening act

- Diosa de la Noche Tour (with Gloria Trevi) (2019)

== Awards and nominations ==
Karol G has received several awards and nominations including ten Latin Grammy Awards (including Album of the Year), one Grammy Award, five Billboard Music Awards, three MTV Europe Music Awards, one MTV Video Music Award, three American Music Awards and ten Lo Nuestro Awards, among others.
