= Bichota Tour =

2021–22 concert tour by Karol G

- Tour by Karol G
- Location: North America; South America
- Associated album: KG0516
- Start date: October 27, 2021
- End date: June 21, 2022
- Legs: 2
- No. of shows: 33 in North America; 14 in South America; 47 in total
- Producer: AEG Live
- Box office: $30.6 million

Karol G concert chronology
- Culpables Tour (2019); Bichota Tour (2021–2022); $trip Love Tour (2022)

The Bichota Tour (subtitled Reloaded in Latin America) was the second concert tour by Colombian singer Karol G, in support of her third studio album, KG0516 (2021). It started on October 27, 2021, in Denver, and concluded on June 21, 2022 in San Salvador, El Salvador. Sponsored by AEG Live, the tour visited auditoriums, indoor arenas and stadiums across North America and South America.

== Shows ==
List of 2021 concerts, showing date, city, country, venue, tickets sold, number of available tickets and amount of gross revenue
Date	City	Country	Venue	Attendance	Revenue
October 27, 2021	Denver	United States	Mission Ballroom	3,689 / 3,689	$324,090
October 29, 2021	El Paso	United States	El Paso County Coliseum	4,821 / 4,821	$417,879
October 30, 2021	Mesa	United States	Mesa Amphitheatre	4,991 / 4,991	$339,441
October 31, 2021	San Diego	United States	Civic Theatre	2,967 / 2,967	$261,788
November 1, 2021	San Jose	United States	San Jose Civic	2,631 / 2,631	$202,510
November 3, 2021	Sacramento	United States	Memorial Auditorium	3,800 / 3,800	$230,132
November 4, 2021	Los Angeles	United States	Microsoft Theater	6,847 / 6,847	$558,986
November 5, 2021	Ontario	United States	Toyota Arena	8,416 / 8,416	$731,156
November 6, 2021	Las Vegas	United States	Virgin Hotels	3,091 / 3,091	$333,282
November 9, 2021	Hidalgo	United States	Payne Arena	6,468 / 6,468	$569,619
November 10, 2021	Sugar Land	United States	Smart Financial Centre	—N/a	—N/a
November 11, 2021	Grand Prairie	United States	Texas Trust CU Theatre	—N/a	—N/a
November 13, 2021	Rosemont	United States	Rosemont Theatre	—N/a	—N/a
November 17, 2021	Philadelphia	United States	Franklin Music Hall	3,636 / 3,636	$350,160
November 18, 2021	New York City	United States	United Palace	2,790 / 2,790	$282,775
November 19, 2021	New York City	United States	Hulu Theater	5,239 / 5,239	$428,015
November 20, 2021	Boston	United States	Wang Theatre	3,132 / 3,132	$288,935
November 22, 2021	Charlotte	United States	Ovens Auditorium	2,369 / 2,369	$238,635
November 23, 2021	Atlanta	United States	The Eastern	1,995 / 1,995	$189,863
November 24, 2021	Orlando	United States	Hard Rock Live	2,829 / 2,829	$193,176
November 26, 2021	Miami	United States	FTX Arena	12,007 / 12,007	$1,045,875
November 27, 2021	San Juan	Puerto Rico	Coliseo José Miguel Agrelot	27,026 / 27,026	$1,699,933
November 28, 2021	San Juan	Puerto Rico	Coliseo José Miguel Agrelot	27,026 / 27,026	$1,699,933
December 4, 2021	Medellín	Colombia	Estadio Atanasio Girardot	63,568 / 63,568	$2,529,343
December 5, 2021	Medellín	Colombia	Estadio Atanasio Girardot	63,568 / 63,568	$2,529,343

List of 2022 concerts, showing date, city, country, venue, tickets sold, number of available tickets and amount of gross revenue
Date	City	Country	Venue	Attendance	Revenue
January 22, 2022	La Romana	Dominican Republic	Altos de Chavón	4,452 / 5,000	$618,802
March 26, 2022	Barranquilla	Colombia	Estadio Romelio Martínez	—N/a	—N/a
April 17, 2022 (Note: The concert on April 17, 2022, at the Empire Polo Cub in Indio, CA, is part of the Coachella Valley Music & Arts Festival.)	Indio	United States	Empire Polo Club	—N/a	—N/a
April 24, 2022 (Note: The concert on April 24, 2022, at the Empire Polo Cub in Indio, CA, is part of the Coachella Valley Music & Arts Festival.)	Indio	United States	Empire Polo Club	—N/a	—N/a
May 14, 2022	Cali	Colombia	Estadio Pascual Guerrero	37,339 / 37,339	$1,573,051
May 21, 2022	Bogotá	Colombia	Movistar Arena	21,340 / 21,340	$1,816,946
May 22, 2022	Bogotá	Colombia	Movistar Arena	21,340 / 21,340	$1,816,946
May 25, 2022	Santiago	Chile	Movistar Arena	26,752 / 26,752	$1,351,674
May 26, 2022	Santiago	Chile	Movistar Arena	26,752 / 26,752	$1,351,674
May 27, 2022	Buenos Aires	Argentina	Movistar Arena	19,462 / 19,462	$644,047
May 28, 2022	Buenos Aires	Argentina	Movistar Arena	19,462 / 19,462	$644,047
June 2, 2022	Quito	Ecuador	Coliseo General Rumiñahui	8,313 / 8,313	$851,491
June 3, 2022	Guayaquil	Ecuador	Coliseo Voltaire Paladines Polo @ Estadio Modelo A.S.H.	7,569 / 7,569	$722,653
June 4, 2022	Lima	Peru	Arena 1	30,485 / 30,485	$2,479,500
June 5, 2022	Lima	Peru	Arena 1	30,485 / 30,485	$2,479,500
June 8, 2022	Guadalajara	Mexico	Auditorio Telmex	8,179 / 8,179	$443,210
June 9, 2022	Monterrey	Mexico	Arena Monterrey	15,000 / 15,000	$582,964
June 11, 2022	Mexico City	Mexico	Arena Ciudad de México	44,000 / 44,000	$2,045,213
June 12, 2022	Mexico City	Mexico	Arena Ciudad de México	44,000 / 44,000	$2,045,213
June 15, 2022	Tegucigalpa	Honduras	Estadio Chochi Sosa	12,436 / 12,436	$1,146,873
June 17, 2022	Alajuela	Costa Rica	Auditorio Coca-Cola	18,477 / 18,477	$924,069
June 18, 2022	Panama City	Panama	Plaza Eventos Amador	7,074 / 7,074	$747,060
June 21, 2022	San Salvador	El Salvador	Estadio Cuscatlán	17,736 / 17,736	$1,281,411
