= List of songs recorded by Karol G =

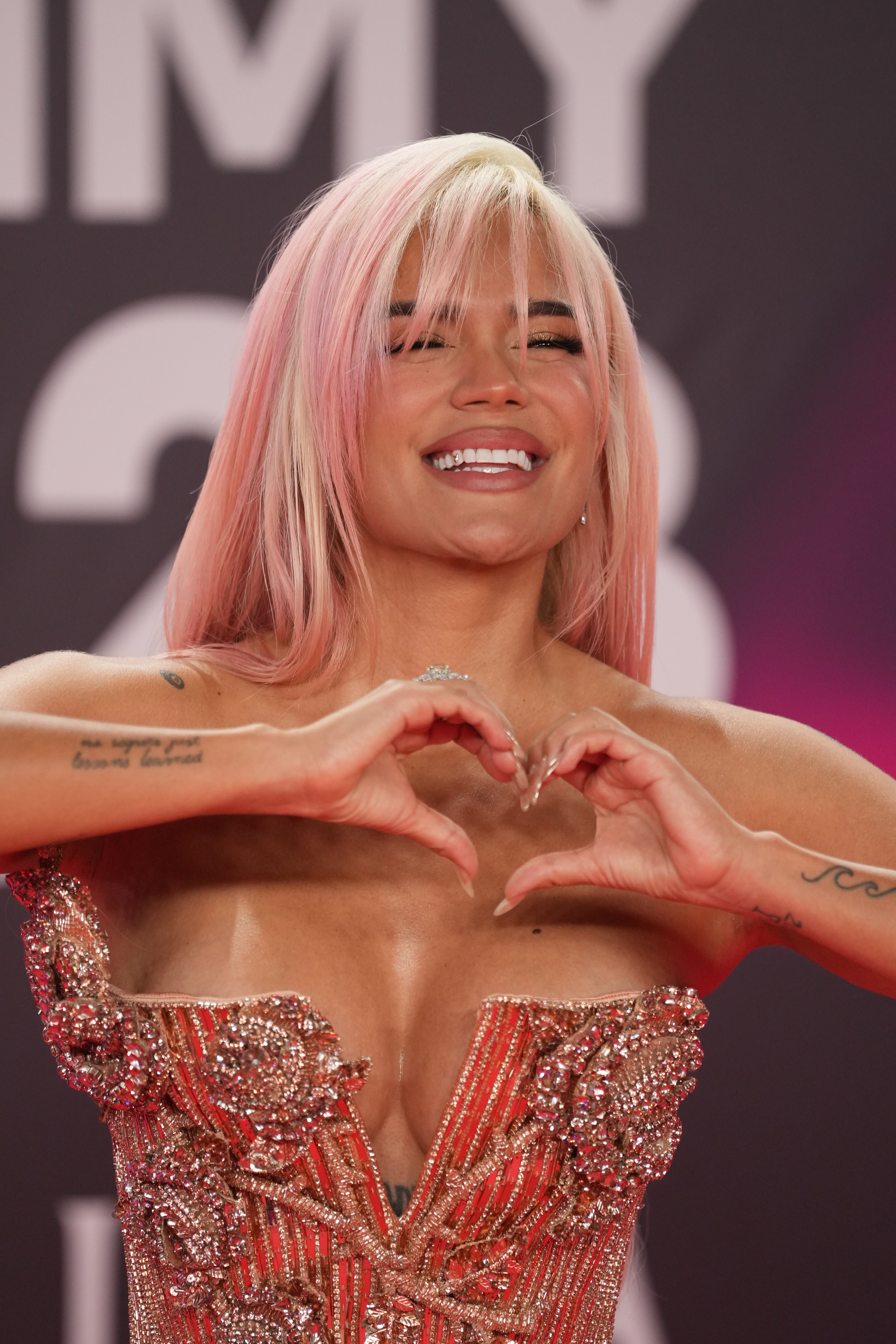
Giraldo in 2023

Karol G is a Colombian singer and songwriter. She is predominantly described as a reggaeton and Latin trap artist, but has experimented with a variety of other genres including reggae and sertanejo.

== Songs ==
Key
†	Indicates single release

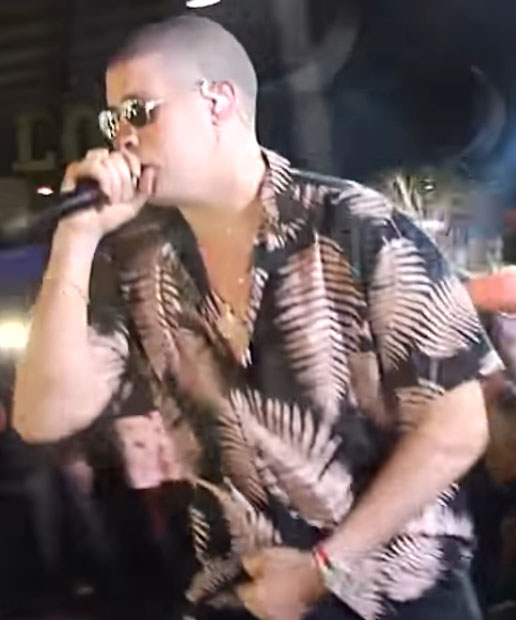
Bad Bunny collaborated with Giraldo on "Ahora Me Llama".

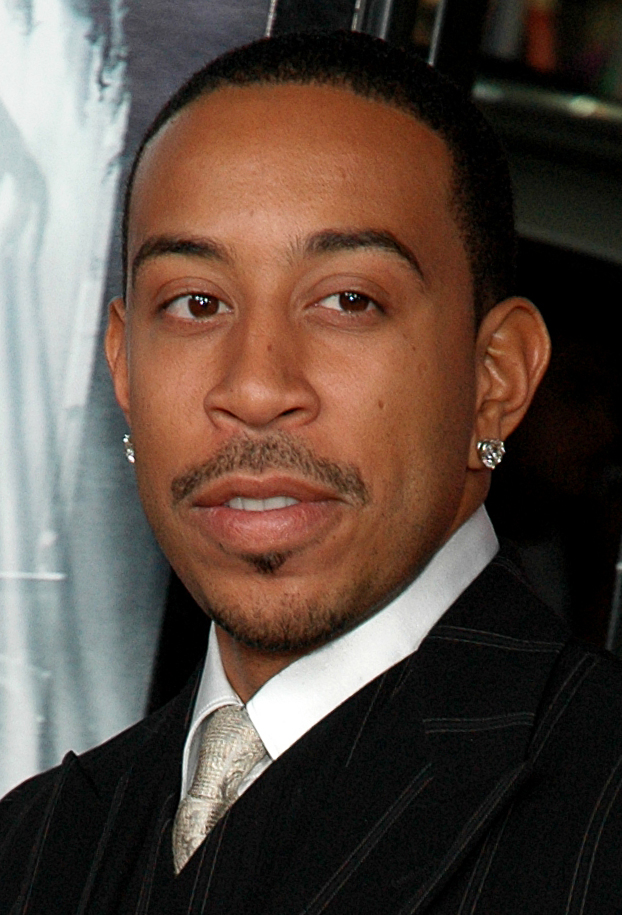
Ludacris collaborated with Giraldo on "Beautiful Boy".

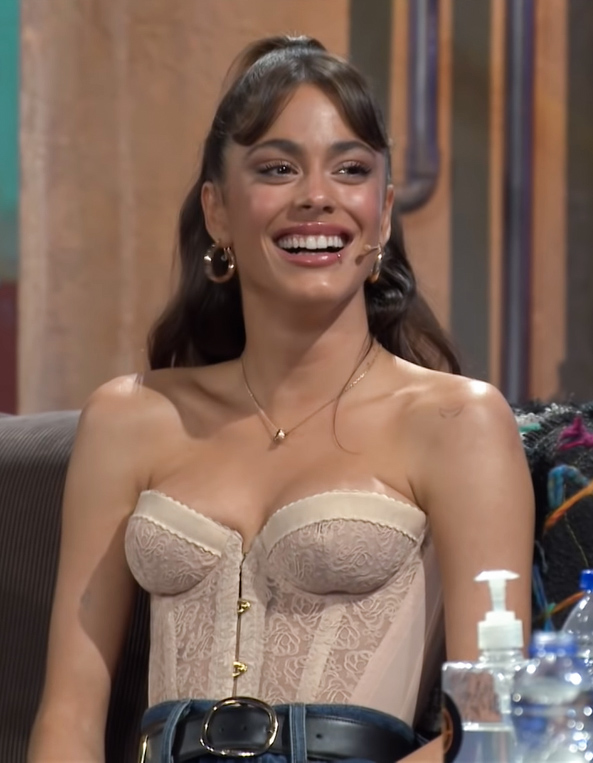
Tini collaborated with Giraldo on "Princesa".

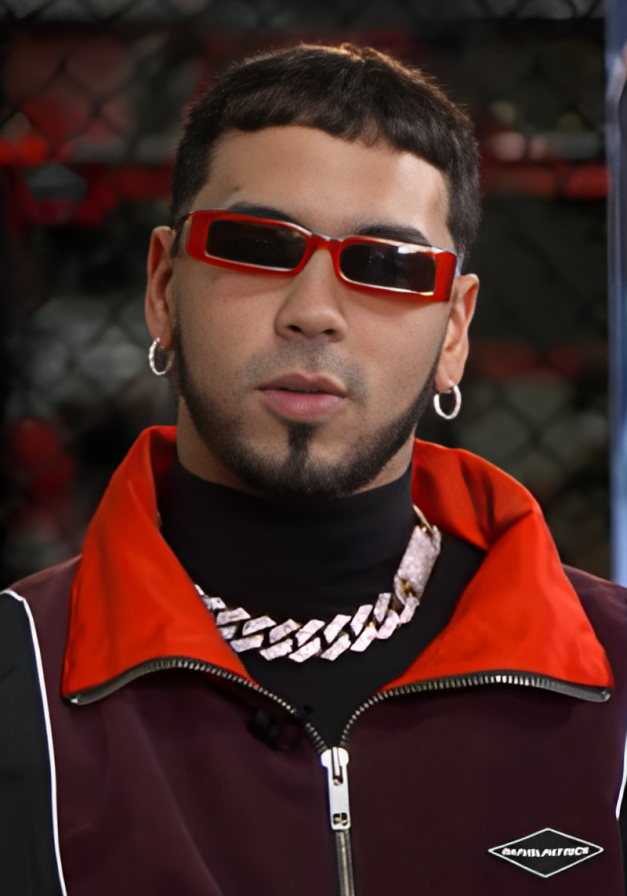
Anuel AA co-wrote "Bebesita", "DVD", "Odisea" and "Sin Corazón". Anuel also collaborated with Giraldo on "China", "Culpables", "Dices Que Te Vas", "Follow", "Location" and "Secreto".

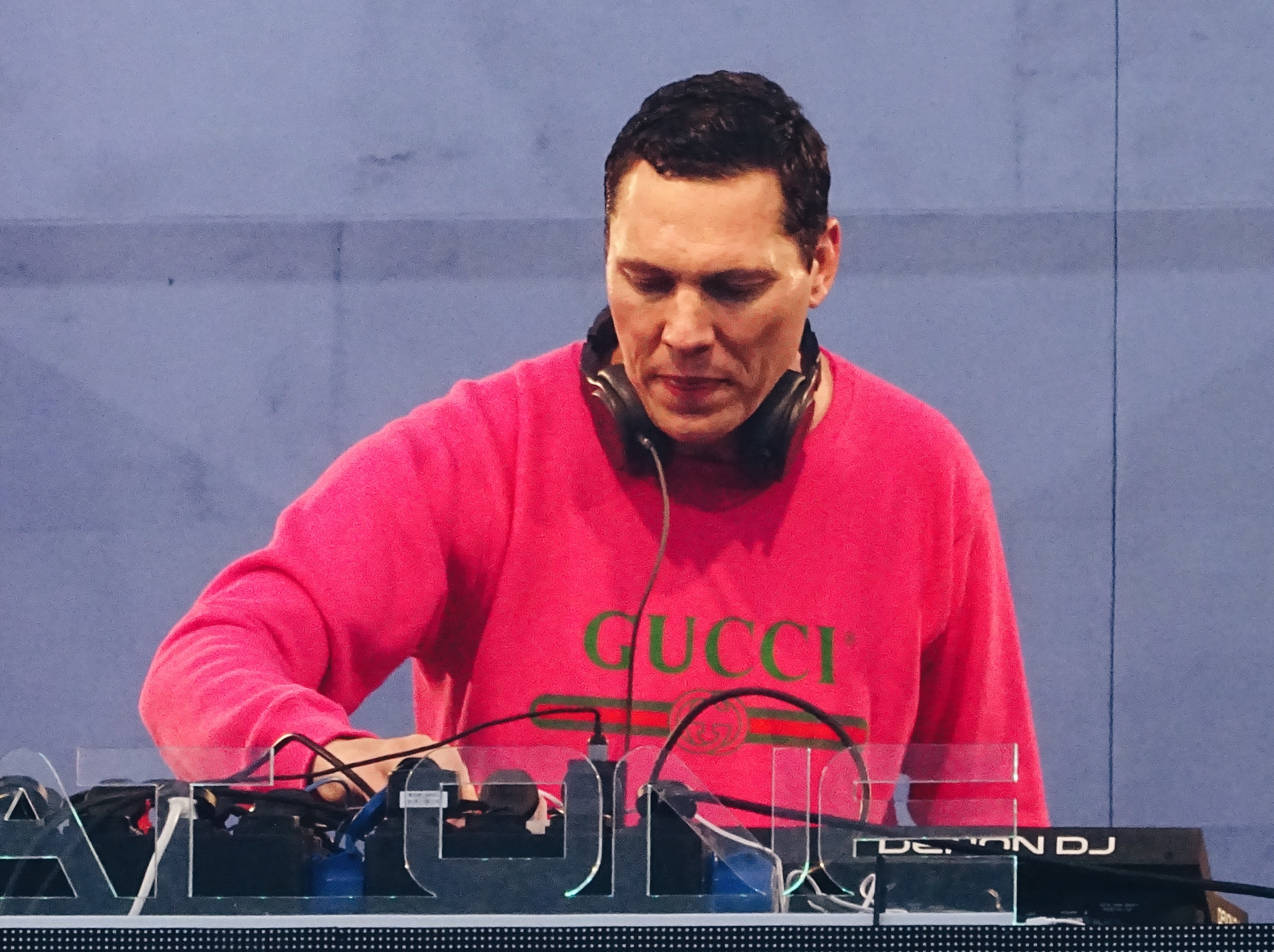
Tiësto collaborated with Giraldo on "Don't Be Shy".

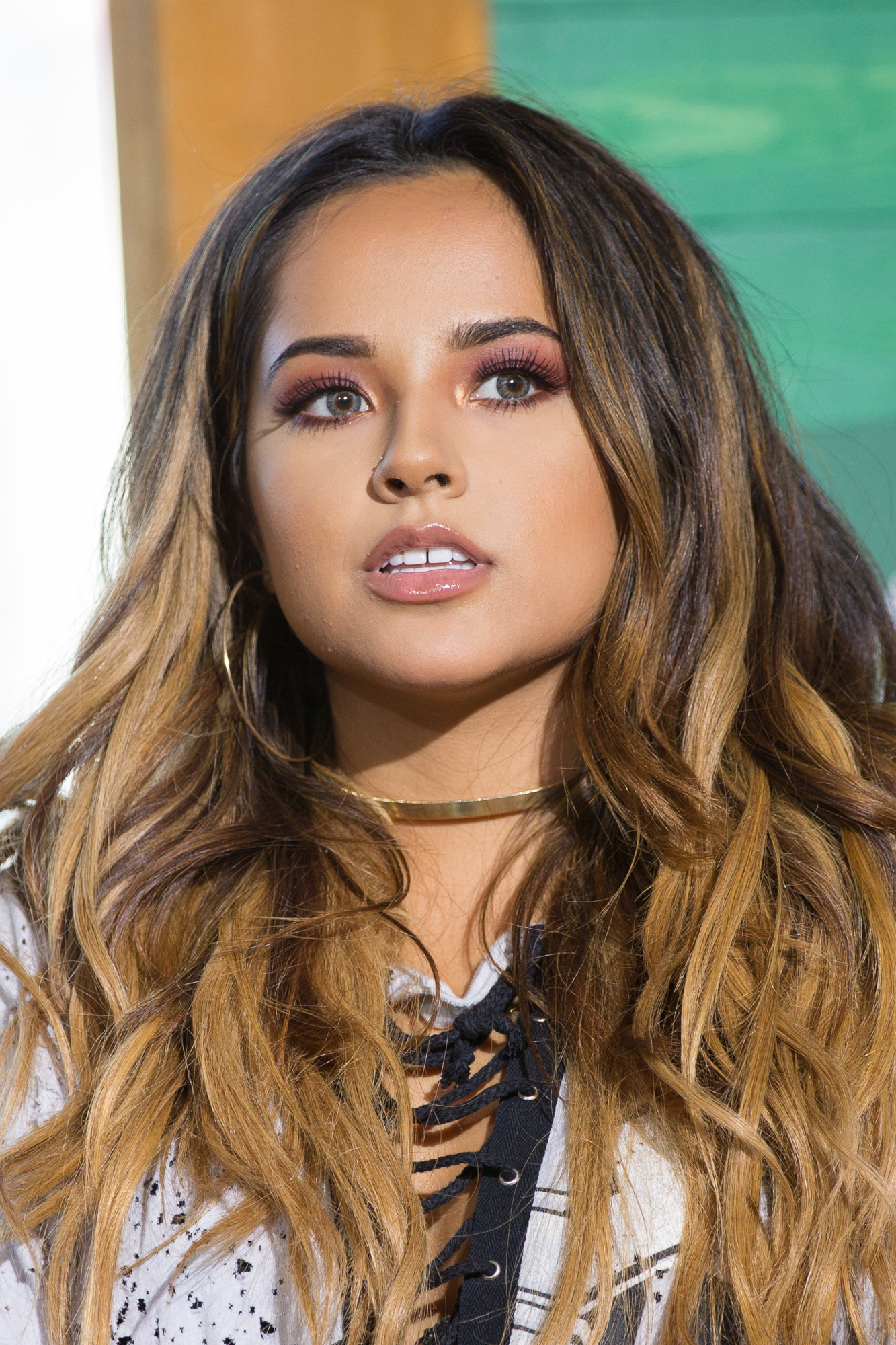
Becky G collaborated with Giraldo on "Mi Mala (Remix)" and "Mamiii".

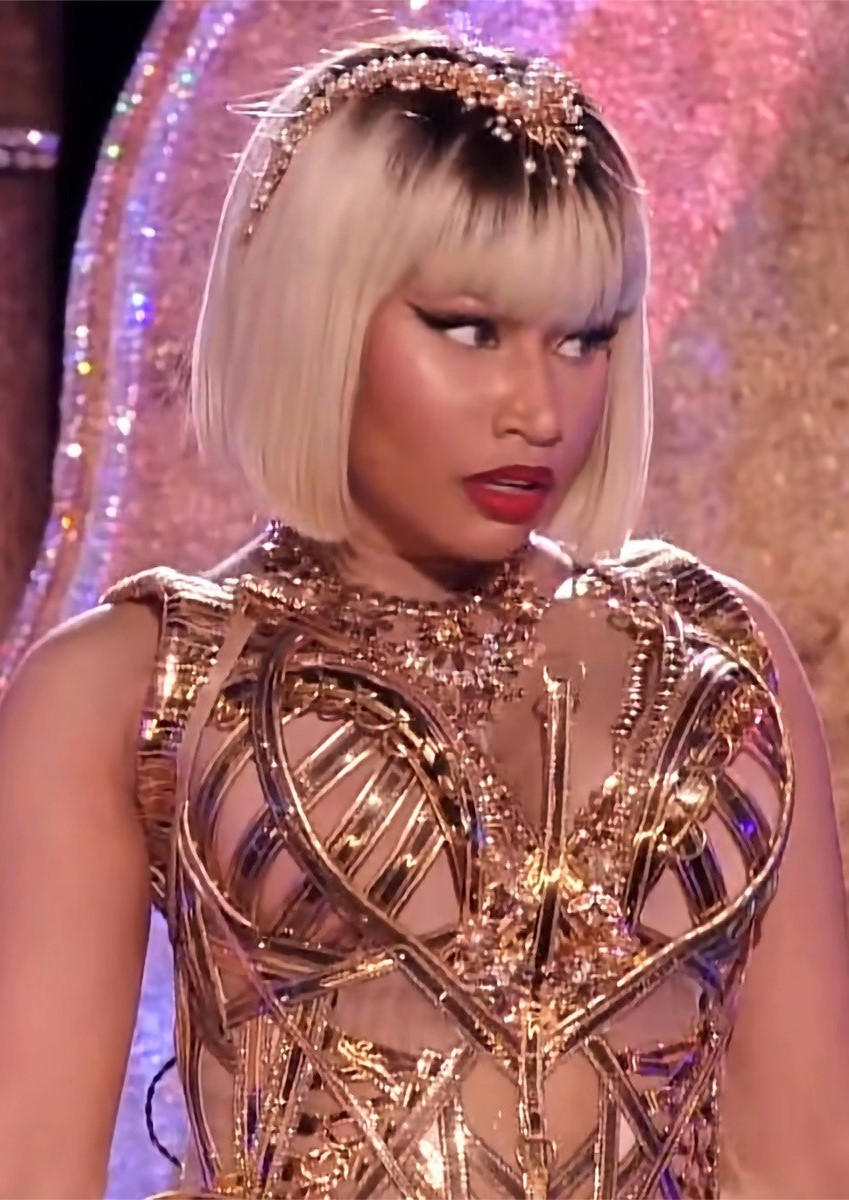
Nicki Minaj collaborated with Giraldo on "Tusa".

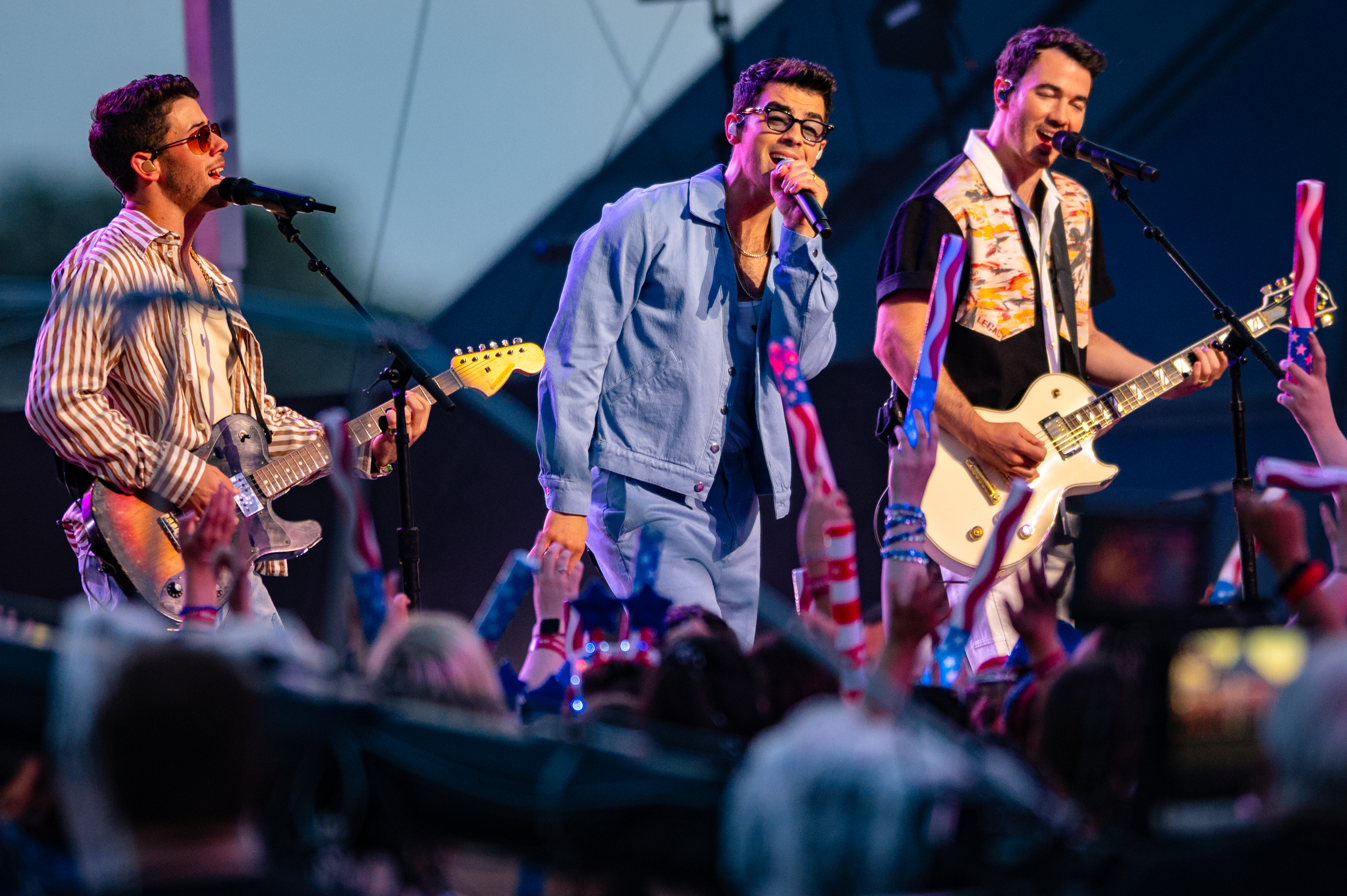
Jonas Brothers collaborated with Giraldo on "X".

Name of song, featured performers, writers, originating album, and year released.
Song	Artist(s)	Writer(s)	Originating album	Year	Ref.
"200 Copas" †	Karol G	Carolina Giraldo Navarro; Daniel Echavarría Oviedo; Daniel Obar Félix	KG0516	2021	
"301" †	Reykon featuring Karol G	Cheztom	—N/a	2012	
"Ahora Me Llama" †	Karol G and Bad Bunny	Daniel Echavarria Oviedo; Carolina Giraldo Navarro; Benito Antonio Martínez Ocasio	Unstoppable	2017	
"Amargura" †	Karol G	Carolina Giraldo Navarro; Daniel Echavarria Oviedo; Kevyn Mauricio Cruz Moreno; Catalino Curet Alonso	Mañana Será Bonito	2023	
"Amor de Dos" †	Karol G featuring Nicky Jam	—N/a	—N/a	2013	
"Amor No Hay"	Karol G	Carolina Giraldo Navarro; Daniel Echavarria Oviedo	Unstoppable	2017	
"Arranca Pal Carajo"	Karol G, Juanka and Brray	Carolina Giraldo Navarro; Daniel Echavarria Oviedo; Juan K. Bauza Blasini; Bryan García Quiñones	KG0516	2021	
"Así Es el Amor"	Karol G	Carolina Giraldo Navarro	Super Single	2013	
"Ay, Dios Mio!" †	Karol G	Carolina Giraldo Navarro; Daniel Echavarria Oviedo; Daniel Alejandro Morales	KG0516	2020	
"Baby"	Karol G	Carolina Giraldo Navarro; Alejandro Ramirez	Ocean	2019	
"Bajo Control" †	Karol G	Carolina Giraldo Navarro	Super Single	2013	
"Beautiful Boy"	Karol G, Ludacris and Emilee	Kisean Anderson; Ben E. King; Jonathan Reuven Rotem; Jerry Leiber; Mike Stoller; Carolina Giraldo Navarro; Christopher Bridges; Daniel Echavarria Oviedo	KG0516	2021	
"Bebesita"	Karol G	Carolina Giraldo Navarro; Carlos Enrique Ortiz Rivera; Juan G. Rivera; Joan Antonio Gonzalez Marrero; Emmanuel Santiago; Jorge Cedeño Echevarria; Miguel Muniz Rohena	Ocean	2019	
"Besties"	Karol G	Carolina Giraldo Navarro; Justin Rafael Quiles Rivera; Julio Manuel González Tavárez; Daniel Echavarria Oviedo	Mañana Será Bonito	2023	
"Bichota" †	Karol G	Carolina Giraldo Navarro; Daniel Echavarria Oviedo; Julio Manuel González Tavárez; Cristian Andrés Salazar; Justin Rafael Quiles Rivera	KG0516	2020	
"Bichota G"	Karol G	Carolina Giraldo Navarro; Alejandro Ramírez Suárez; Nicolás Ignacio Jaña	Mañana Será Bonito (Bichota Season)	2023	
"Caballero" †	Moderatto featuring Karol G	Federico Vindver; Jay de la Cueva; Marcela de la Garza; Carolina Giraldo Navarro	—N/a	2018	
"Cairo" †	Karol G and Ovy on the Drums	Carolina Giraldo Navarro; Daniel Echavarria Oviedo; Kevyn Mauricio Cruz Moreno	Mañana Será Bonito	2022	
"Calypso (Remix)" †	Luis Fonsi, Stefflon Don and Karol G	Luis Alfonso Rodríguez; Dyo; Mauricio Rengifo; Andrés Torres; Stephanie Victoria Allen	Vida	2018	
"Caramelo (Remix)" †	Ozuna, Karol G and Myke Towers	Jan Carlos Ozuna Rosado; Marcos Masís; Alexis Gotay; Carolina Giraldo Navarro; Eduardo Alfonso Vargas Berrios; Michael Torres; Starlin Rivas Batista; Yazid Rivera Lopez	ENOC	2020	
"Carolina"	Karol G	Carolina Giraldo Navarro; Daniel Echavarria Oviedo; Kevyn Mauricio Cruz Moreno; Luis Miguel Gonzalez Bose	Mañana Será Bonito	2023	
"Casi Nada" †	Karol G	Carolina Giraldo Navarro; Andy Clay; Gabriel Rodriguez; Gustavo Alberto; Hector Ruben Rivera; Daniel Echavarria Oviedo	Unstoppable	2016	
"China" †	Anuel AA, Daddy Yankee, Karol G, Ozuna and J Balvin	Emmanuel Gazmey; Ramón Ayala; Carolina Giraldo Navarro; Jan Carlos Ozuna; José Osorio; Orville Burrell; Rickardo Ducent; Shaun Pizzonia; Brian Thompson; Harold Ray Brown; Le Roy Lonnie Jordan; Charles William Miller; Lee Oskar; Howard E. Scott; B.B. Dickerson	Emmanuel	2019	
"Contigo" †	Karol G and Tiësto	Ryan Tedder; Björn Djupström; Tyler Spry; Tijs Michiel Verwest; Carolina Giraldo Navarro; Yasmani Luis Bandera Clark; Jesse McCartney	—N/a	2024	
"Contigo Voy a Muerte"	Karol G and Camilo	Carolina Giraldo Navarro; Daniel Echavarria Oviedo; Kevyn Mauricio Cruz Moreno; Camilo Echeverry	KG0516	2021	
"Créeme" †	Karol G and Maluma	René Cano Ríos; Kevyn Mauricio Cruz Moreno; Lenin Yorney Palacios Machado; Filly Andrés Lima Maya; Juan Camilo Vargas Vasquez; Juan Luis Londoño; Carolina Giraldo Navarro	Ocean	2018	
"Culpables" †	Karol G and Anuel AA	Carolina Giraldo Navarro; Emmanuel Santiago; Luis E. Ortiz Rivera; Carlos Enrique Ortiz Rivera; Juan G. Rivera; Daniel Echavarria Oviedo	Ocean	2018	
"Dame Tu Cosita (Remix)" †	El Chombo, Pitbull and Karol G featuring Cutty Ranks	Rodney Sebastian Clark Donalds	—N/a	2018	
"Dañamos la Amistad"	Karol G and Sech	Carolina Giraldo Navarro; Jorge Valdés Vázquez; Carlos Isaias Morales Williams	Mañana Será Bonito	2023	
"De Qué Vale"	Karol G	Carolina Giraldo Navarro	Super Single	2013	
"Déjalos Que Miren"	Karol G	Carolina Giraldo Navarro; Daniel Echavarria Oviedo; Justin Rafael Quiles Rivera; Julio Manuel González Tavárez	KG0516	2021	
"Deséame Suerte" †	Jhayco featuring Karol G and Haze	Jesús Manuel Nieves Cortés; Carolina Giraldo Navarro	Famouz Reloaded	2019	
"Dicen" †	Antonio Orozco featuring Karol G	Antonio Orozco; Carolina Giraldo Navarro	—N/a	2018	
"Dices Que Te Vas"	Karol G and Anuel AA	Carolina Giraldo Navarro; Emmanuel Santiago; Jose Manuel Gazmey; Jose Gazmey Santiago	Ocean	2019	
"Dime" †	Karol G featuring Andy Rivera	Carolina Giraldo Navarro; Andrés Felipe Rivera	—N/a	2015	
"Dime Que Si" †	Karol G	Carolina Giraldo Navarro	Super Single	2009	
"Dispo"	Karol G featuring Young Miko	Carolina Giraldo Navarro; Diego López Crespo; Kevyn Mauricio Cruz Moreno; Maria Victoria Ramirez de Arellano; Mariana Beatriz Lopez Crespo	Mañana Será Bonito (Bichota Season)	2023	
"Don't Be Shy" †	Tiësto and Karol G	Carolina Giraldo Navarro; Jonas David Kröper; Teemu Brunila; Tijs Verwest; Yoshi Breen	Drive	2021	
"DVD"	Karol G	Carolina Giraldo Navarro; Daniel Echavarria Oviedo; Gabriel Mora Quintero; Emmanuel Santiago; Daniel Alejandro Morales Reyes	KG0516	2021	
"El Barco" †	Karol G	Carolina Giraldo Navarro; Daniel Echavarria Oviedo; Gabriel Mora Quintero	KG0516	2021	
"A Ella" †	Karol G	Mauricio Rengifo; Andrés Torres; Carolina Giraldo Navarro	Unstoppable	2017	
"El Makinon" †	Karol G and Mariah Angeliq	Carolina Giraldo Navarro; Mariah Angelique Pérez; Jose Carlos Cruz; Freddy Montalvo; Gabriel Armando Mora Quintero	KG0516	2021	
"El Pecado"	Karol G	Carolina Giraldo Navarro; Daniel Echavarria Oviedo	Unstoppable	2017	
"En la Playa" †	Karol G	Carolina Giraldo Navarro	Super Single	2007	
"Enjoy Yourself"	Pop Smoke featuring Karol G	Bashar Jackson; Carolina Giraldo Navarro; Richard Preston Butler Jr. Karim Kharbouch; Pierre Meador; Christoffer Marcussen; Lucas Grob	Shoot for the Stars, Aim for the Moon	2020	
"Eres Mi Todo" †	Karol G	Daniel Echavarria Oviedo; Ronny Kevin Roldán Velasco; John Fredy Marin; Jessyd Ramírez; Carolina Giraldo Navarro	Unstoppable	2017	
"Find You (Remix)"	Nick Jonas featuring Karol G	Nick Jonas; Simon Wilcox; Jakob Hazell; Svante Halldin	—N/a	2017	
"Follow" †	Karol G and Anuel AA	Carolina Giraldo Navarro; Daniel Echavarria Oviedo; Emmanuel Santiago; Brown Fernando Orlando; Ramon Bustamente	—N/a	2020	
"Friki" †	Feid and Karol G	Salomón Villada Hoyos; Daniel Luis Rodriguez; Carolina Giraldo Navarro; Alejandro Ramirez; Esteban Higuita Estrada	Inter Shibuya – La Mafia	2021	
"Ganas de Ti"	Karol G	Carolina Giraldo Navarro; Daniel Echavarria Oviedo	Unstoppable	2017	
"Gatita Gangster"	Karol G featuring Dei V	Carolina Giraldo Navarro; Alejandro Ramírez Suárez; Davis G Juarbe; Nicolás Ignacio Jaña	Mañana Será Bonito (Bichota Season)	2023	
"Gato Malo"	Karol G and Nathy Peluso	Carolina Giraldo Navarro; Daniel Echavarria Oviedo; Natalia Peluso	KG0516	2021	
"Gatúbela" †	Karol G and Maldy	Carolina Giraldo Navarro; Marvin Hawkins Rodríguez; Edwin Vázquez Vega; Justin Rafael Quiles Rivera; Julio Manuel González Tavárez	Mañana Será Bonito	2022	
"Go Karo"	Karol G	Carolina Giraldo Navarro; Daniel Echavarria Oviedo; Pato Banton	Ocean	2019	
"Gracias a Ti" †	Karol G	Carolina Giraldo Navarro	Super Single	2013	
"Gucci los Paños"	Karol G	Carolina Giraldo Navarro; Edgar Barrera; Andrés David Restrepo Echavarría; Salomón Villada Hoyos; Jorge Alvaro Diaz	Mañana Será Bonito	2023	
"Hello" †	Karol G and Ozuna	Carolina Giraldo Navarro; Daniel Echavarria Oviedo; Jan Carlos Ozuna Rosado	Unstoppable	2016	
"Hijoepu*#" †	Gloria Trevi and Karol G	Antonio Moreno; Mario Cáceres; Edgar Barrera; Daniel Echavarria Oviedo; Camilo Echeverry; Gloria de los Ángeles Treviño; Carolina Giraldo Navarro	Diosa De La Noche	2019	
"Kármika"	Karol G, Bad Gyal and Sean Paul	Carolina Giraldo Navarro; Daniel Echavarria Oviedo; Kevyn Mauricio Cruz Moreno; Sean Paul Ryan Francis Henriques; Alba Farelo Sole	Mañana Será Bonito	2023	
"La Dama" †	Karol G and Cosculluela	Carolina Giraldo Navarro; Daniel Echavarria Oviedo; Jorge Luis Zambrano Caraballo; Gabriel Alexander Pinto Medina; José Fernando Cosculluela Suárez	Unstoppable	2017	
"La Ocasión Perfecta"	Karol G featuring Yandel	Carolina Giraldo Navarro; Daniel Echavarria Oviedo; Llandel Veguilla Malave; Víctor Viera Moore	Ocean	2019	
"La Vida Continuó" †	Karol G featuring Simone & Simaria	Carolina Giraldo Navarro; Daniel Echavarria Oviedo; Rafael Silva de Queiroz; Cristian Andrés Salazar	Ocean	2019	
"La Vida Es Una"	Karol G	Kevyn Mauricio Cruz Moreno; Carolina Giraldo Navarro; Daniel Echavarria Oviedo	Puss in Boots: The Last Wish	2022	
"Leyendas"	Karol G, Wisin & Yandel and Nicky Jam featuring Ivy Queen, Zion and Alberto Stylee	Maria Pasante; Félix Gerardo Ortiz Torres; Gabriel Enrique Pizarro; Juana Socorro Guerrido Flores; Rafael Pina; Nick Rivera Caminero; Luis F.Cortes; Nelson Diaz; Carlos Alberto; Annie Lennox; Marcos Masis; Juan Luis Morera Luna; David A. Stewart; Llandel Veguilla Malave	KG0516	2021	
"Lloro Por Ti" †	Karol G featuring Mario Domm	Carolina Giraldo Navarro	—N/a	2013	
"Location" †	Karol G, Anuel AA and J Balvin	Carolina Giraldo Navarro; Daniel Echavarria Oviedo; Emmanuel Santiago; José Álvaro Osorio Balvin	KG0516	2021	
"Lo Sabe Dios"	Karol G	Carolina Giraldo Navarro; Daniel Echavarria Oviedo; Fernando Tobon	Unstoppable	2017	
"Lo Que Siento por Ti" †	Sebastián Yatra featuring Karol G	Kenai; Carolina Giraldo Navarro; Sebastián Yatra	The Mixtape JukeBox, Vol. 1	2016	
"Love with a Quality" †	Karol G featuring Damian Marley	Carolina Giraldo Navarro; Damian Marley; Daniel Echavarria Oviedo	Ocean	2019	
"Mamiii" †	Becky G and Karol G	Rebbeca Marie Gomez; Daniel Echavarría Oviedo; Elena Rose; Carolina Giraldo Navarro; Justin Rafael Quiles Rivera; Luis Miguel Gomez Castaño; Daniel Uribe	Esquemas	2022	
"Mañana" †	Andy Rivera featuring Karol G	Mosty; Daniel Echavarría Oviedo; Andrés Felipe Rivera; Carolina Giraldo Navarro	—N/a	2014	
"Mañana Será Bonito"	Karol G and Carla Morrison	Carolina Giraldo Navarro; Marco Masis; Carla Patricia Morrison Flores; Alejandro Jiménez	Mañana Será Bonito	2023	
"Me Ilusioné"	Karol G	Carolina Giraldo Navarro	Super Single	2013	
"Me Tengo Que Ir"	Karol G featuring Kali Uchis	Carolina Giraldo Navarro; Karly-Marina Loaiza; Alejandro Ramírez Suárez	Mañana Será Bonito (Bichota Season)	2023	
"Mercurio"	Karol G	Carolina Giraldo Navarro; Esteban Higuita Estrada; Pedro Luiz Garcia Caropreso; Danilo Valbusa; Marcelo de Araujo Ferraz	Mañana Será Bonito	2023	
"Mi Cama" †	Karol G	Carolina Giraldo Navarro; Antonio Rayo Gibo; René David Cano Ríos; Andy Clay; Omar Luis Sabino	Ocean	2018	
"Mi Ex Tenía Razón" †	Karol G	Carolina Giraldo Navarro; Andres Jael Correa Rios; Edgar Barrera; Kevyn Mauricio Cruz Moreno; Marco Daniel Borrero	Mañana Será Bonito (Bichota Season)	2023	
"Mi Mala" †	Mau y Ricky and Karol G	Ricardo Montaner; Camilo Echeverry; Mauricio Montaner; Marco Masis; Jon Leone; Max Matluck; Carolina Giraldo Navarro	Para Aventuras y Curiosidades	2017	
"Miedito o Qué?" †	Ovy on the Drums and Danny Ocean featuring Karol G	Carolina Giraldo Navarro; Daniel Echavarria Oviedo; Daniel Alejandro Morales	—N/a	2020	
"Mientras Me Curo del Cora" †	Karol G	Carolina Giraldo Navarro; Daniel Echavarria Oviedo; Kevyn Mauricio Cruz Moreno; Robert McFerrin Jr.	Mañana Será Bonito	2023	
"Mil Maneras"	Karol G	Carolina Giraldo Navarro	Super Single	2013	
"Muñeco de Lego"	Karol G	Daniel Echavarria Oviedo; Carolina Giraldo Navarro	Unstoppable	2017	
"No Me Cansare" †	Sevdaliza and Karol G	Carolina Giraldo Navarro; Frankie Scoca; Mathias Janmaat; Megan Bulow; Sevda Alizadeh	—N/a	2024	
"No Pares"	Karol G	Carolina Giraldo Navarro	Super Single	2013	
"No Puedo Seguir"	Karol G	Carolina Giraldo Navarro	Super Single	2013	
"No Te Deseo El Mal" †	Eladio Carrión and Karol G	Eladio Carrión; Carolina Giraldo Navarro	Sauce Boyz 2	2021	
"Ocean" †	Karol G	Carolina Giraldo Navarro; Daniel Echavarria Oviedo; Carlos Isaias Morales Williams; Jorge Valdés Vázquez	Ocean	2019	
"Odisea"	Karol G and Ozuna	Carolina Giraldo Navarro; Daniel Echavarria Oviedo; Jan Carlos Ozuna Rosado; Emmanuel Santiago; Martin Rodriguez; Kevyn Mauricio Cruz Moreno	KG0516	2021	
"Ojos Ferrari"	Karol G, Justin Quiles and Ángel Dior	Carolina Giraldo Navarro; Ángel Rosario Dior; Justin Rafael Quiles Rivera; Daniel Echavarria Oviedo	Mañana Será Bonito	2023	
"Oki Doki"	Karol G	Carolina Giraldo Navarro; Alejandro Ramírez Suárez; Nicolás Ignacio Jaña	Mañana Será Bonito (Bichota Season)	2023	
"Peligrosa" †	Lartiste featuring Karol G	Jean Rodríguez; Jam Aunni; Ismaili Alaoui Othmane; Carolina Giraldo Navarro; Youssef Akdim	Quartier Latin Vol. 1	2019	
"Pero Tú"	Karol G and Quevedo	Carolina Giraldo Navarro; Daniel Echavarría Oviedo; Pedro Luis Domínguez Quevedo	Mañana Será Bonito	2023	
"Pineapple" †	Karol G	Mauricio Alberto Reglero Rodriguez; Ricardo Andres Reglero; Carolina Giraldo Navarro; Sky	Ocean	2018	
"Poblado (Remix)" †	J Balvin, Nicky Jam and Karol G featuring Crissin, Totoy El Frio and Natan & Shander	Kevyn Cruz Moreno; Alexander Baena Vergara; Alexander Rojas Pineda; Andres Jael Correa Rios; Carolina Giraldo Navarro; Christian Tascon Velasco; Fabrizzio Hernández Dovalle; Gerald Oscar Jimenez; Jhon Marín Bastidas; José Osorio; Juan Vargas; Juan Lujan Torres; Juan Medina; Justin Rafael Quiles Rivera; Natanael Baena Vergara; Nick Rivera Caminero	Jose	2021	
"Por Ti" †	Karol G	Carolina Giraldo Navarro	Super Single	2008	
"Princesa" †	Tini and Karol G	Mauricio Rengifo; Andrés Torres; Martina Stoessel; Carolina Giraldo Navarro	Quiero Volver	2018	
"Provenza" †	Karol G	Daniel Echavarria Oviedo; Carolina Giraldo Navarro; Kevyn Mauricio Cruz Moreno	Mañana Será Bonito	2022	
"Punto G" †	Karol G	Carolina Giraldo Navarro; Andy Clay; Antonio Rayo	Ocean	2019	
"Qlona"	Karol G featuring Peso Pluma	Carolina Giraldo Navarro; Hassan Emilio Kabande Laija; Daniel Echavarria Oviedo; Daniel Esteban Gutiérrez	Mañana Será Bonito (Bichota Season)	2023	
"Ricos Besos" †	Karol G	Daniel Echavarria Oviedo	—N/a	2014	
"S91" †	Karol G	Carolina Giraldo Navarro; Daniel Echavarria Oviedo; Kevyn Mauricio Cruz Moreno	Mañana Será Bonito (Bichota Season)	2023	
"Secreto" †	Anuel AA and Karol G	Prida; EZ Made Da Beat; Carolina Giraldo Navarro; Emmanuel Santiago	Emmanuel	2019	
"Sejodioto" †	Karol G	Daniel Echavarria Oviedo; Justin Rafael Quiles Rivera; Julio Manuel González Tavárez; Cristian Andrés Salazar; Carolina Giraldo Navarro	—N/a	2021	
"Si Antes Te Hubiera Conocido" †	Karol G	Carolina Giraldo Navarro; Édgar Barrera; Andrés Jael Correa Ríos; Alejandro Ramírez Suárez	—N/a	2024	
"Si Te Confieso" †	Karol G	Carolina Giraldo Navarro	—N/a	2014	
"Sin Corazón"	Karol G	Carolina Giraldo Navarro; Emmanuel Santiago; Edgar Semper; Xavier Semper; Luian Malavé; Hector Ramos; Miguel Pérez; Cristian Colon; Ervin Quiroz; Daniel Echavarria Oviedo	Ocean	2019	
"Sola Es Mejor"	Karol G and Yandar & Yostin	Carolina Giraldo Navarro; Daniel Echavarria Oviedo; Oscar Andrés Gutiérrez Serna; Juan Esteban Castañeda; Gabriel Mora Quintero; Anderson José Arellan Sabino	KG0516	2021	
"A Solas"	Karol G	Carolina Giraldo Navarro; Daniel Echavarria Oviedo	Unstoppable	2017	
"Te Lo Quiero Hacer" †	Karol G featuring De La Ghetto	Rafael Castillo Torres; Carolina Giraldo Navarro	—N/a	2015	
"TQG" †	Karol G and Shakira	Carolina Giraldo Navarro; Daniel Echavarria Oviedo; Shakira Isabel Mebarak Ripoll; Kevyn Mauricio Cruz Moreno	Mañana Será Bonito	2023	
"Tu Pum Pum" †	Karol G and Shaggy	Edgardo Franco; Orville Richard Burrell; Carolina Giraldo Navarro; Sekuence	—N/a	2018	
"Tusa" †	Karol G and Nicki Minaj	Carolina Giraldo Navarro; Onika Maraj; Daniel Echavarria Oviedo; Kevyn Mauricio Cruz Moreno; Juan Camilo Vargas	KG0516	2019	
"Tus Gafitas"	Karol G	Carolina Giraldo Navarro; Finneas O'Connell; Daniel Echavarría Oviedo	Mañana Será Bonito	2023	
"Un Viaje" †	Jotaerre featuring Karol G, Alejo and Moffa	Moffa; Carolina Giraldo Navarro; Alejo; Jotaerre	—N/a	2022	
"Una Noche en Medellín" (Remix)	Karol G, Cris MJ and Ryan Castro	Carolina Giraldo Navarro; Cristopher Andrés Álvarez Garcia; Bryan Castro Sosa; Francisco Eduardo Burgos Gallardo	Mañana Será Bonito (Bichota Season)	2023	
"Watati"	Karol G featuring Aldo Ranks	Carolina Giraldo Navarro; Daniel Echavarría Oviedo; Aldo Vargas	Barbie the Album	2023	
"X" †	Jonas Brothers featuring Karol G	Shellback; Ryan Tedder; Nicholas Jonas; Carolina Giraldo Navarro; Ali Tamposi	—N/a	2020	
"X Si Volvemos" †	Karol G and Romeo Santos	Carolina Giraldo Navarro; Daniel Echavarria Oviedo; Anthony Romeo Santos; Kevyn Mauricio Cruz Moreno; Joseph Alexis Negron Velez; Josias De La Cruz; Juan Luis Morera Luna; Llandel Veguilla Malave; Ernesto Fidel Padilla	Mañana Será Bonito	2023	
"Ya No Te Creo" †	Karol G	Daniel Echavarria Oviedo; Carolina Giraldo Navarro	—N/a	2015	
"Yo Aprendí"	Karol G featuring Danay Suárez	Carolina Giraldo Navarro; Danay Suárez	Ocean	2019	
