= Karol G discography =

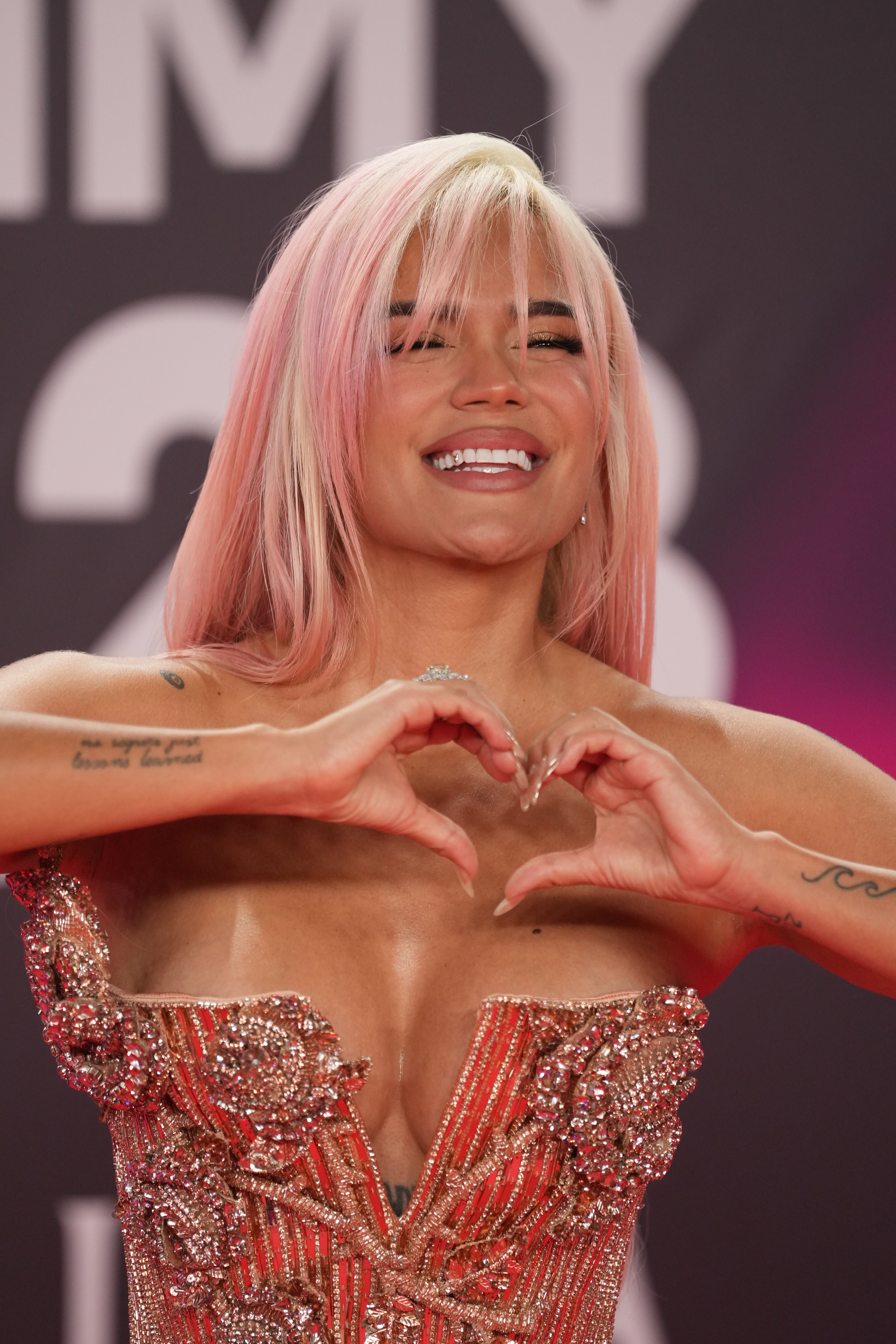
- Karol G in 2023
- Studio albums: 6
- Singles: 94
- Mixtapes: 2
- Promotional singles: 12

The discography of Colombian singer Karol G consists of six studio albums, two mixtapes, 94 singles (including 9 as featured artist) and 12 promotional singles.

Her collaboration with Puerto Rican rapper Bad Bunny "Ahora Me Llama" became her breakthrough hit, and was the lead single for her debut album Unstoppable, released in 2017. In late 2018, her song "Secreto" became a hit in Latin America as she and Anuel AA publicly confirmed their relationship in the music video. In July 2019, she released "China" in collaboration with Anuel AA, Daddy Yankee, Ozuna and J Balvin, which became her first music video with over one billion views on YouTube. In May 2019, she released the album Ocean, which served as a stylistic departure from Unstoppable, incorporating a more relaxed atmosphere in her work. Her song "Tusa" with Nicki Minaj also charted internationally and was certified 28× Latin Platinum by the RIAA, staying #1 on the Billboard Argentina Hot 100 chart for 25 weeks.

With her fourth album, Mañana Será Bonito (2023), Karol G became the first woman to ever debut at number one on the Billboard 200 chart with a Spanish-language album. She achieved her highest-charting single on the Billboard Hot 100 with the album's top 10 song "TQG", a collaboration with Shakira.

== Albums ==
=== Studio albums ===
List of studio albums, with selected details, chart positions, and certifications
Title	Studio album details	Peak chart positions										Certifications
Title	Studio album details	BEL (FL)	BEL (WA)	CAN	FRA	ITA	NLD	SPA	SWI	US	US Latin	Certifications
Unstoppable	Released: 27 October 2017; Label: Universal Latino; Formats: CD, LP, digital download, streaming	—	—	—	—	—	—	79	—	192	2	AMPROFON: 3× Platinum+Gold; RIAA: 2× Platinum (Latin)
Ocean	Released: 3 May 2019; Label: Universal Latino; Formats: CD, LP, digital download, streaming	—	—	—	—	—	—	82	—	54	2	AMPROFON: 2× Diamond+2× Platinum; CAPIF: 2× Diamond; RIAA: 5× Platinum (Latin)
KG0516	Released: 26 March 2021; Label: Universal Latino; Formats: CD, LP, digital download, streaming	—	—	—	155	68	—	3	48	20	1	AMPROFON: 3× Diamond+Platinum; CAPIF: 4× Diamond; FIMI: Gold; PROMUSICAE: Platinum; RIAA: 11× Platinum (Latin)
Mañana Será Bonito	Released: February 24, 2023; Label: Universal Latino; Format: CD, LP, digital download, streaming	83	87	13	55	30	53	1	7	1	1	FIMI: Gold; MC: Platinum; PROMUSICAE: 5× Platinum; RIAA: 28× Platinum (Latin); SNEP: Gold
Tropicoqueta	Released: 20 June 2025; Label: Bichota, Interscope; Formats: CD, LP, digital download, streaming	65	45	23	30	42	30	1	2	3	1	BRMA: Gold; FIMI: Gold; MC: Gold; PROMUSICAE: 2× Platinum
No Me Arrepiento de Sentir Tanto	Released: August 7, 2026; Label: Bichota, Interscope; Formats: CD, LP, digital download, streaming	183	118	56	101	—	91	3	11	8	1	
"—" denotes a title that was not released or did not chart in that territory

=== Mixtapes ===
List of mixtapes, with selected details, chart positions, and certifications
Title	Studio album details	Peak chart positions							Certifications
Title	Studio album details	CAN	FRA	ITA	SPA	SWI	US	US Latin	Certifications
Super Single	Released: 29 October 2013; Label: JM World Music; Formats: digital download, streaming	—	—	—	—	—	—	—	
Mañana Será Bonito (Bichota Season)	Released: 11 August 2023; Label: Bichota, Interscope; Formats: CD, digital download, streaming, vinyl	77	139	86	1	12	3	1	PROMUSICAE: 2× Platinum; RIAA: Gold; RIAA: 8× Platinum (Latin)
"—" denotes a title that was not released or did not chart in that territory

== Singles ==
=== As lead artist ===
==== 2000s–2010s ====
List of singles as lead artist in the 2000s–2010s, showing year released, selected chart positions, certifications, and originating album
Title	Year	Peak chart positions										Certifications	Album
Title	Year	COL	ARG	ECU	FRA	ITA	MEX	SPA	SWI	US	US Latin	Certifications	Album
"En la Playa"	2007	—	—	—	—	—	—	—	—	—	—		Super Single
"Por Ti"	2008	—	—	—	—	—	—	—	—	—	—		Super Single
"Dime Que Si"	2009	—	—	—	—	—	—	—	—	—	—		Super Single
"Bajo Control"	2013	—	—	—	—	—	—	—	—	—	—		Super Single
"Gracias a Ti"	2013	—	—	—	—	—	—	—	—	—	—		Super Single
"Amor de Dos" (featuring Nicky Jam)	2013	—	—	—	—	—	—	—	—	—	—		Non-album singles
"Lloro Por Ti" (featuring Mario Domm)	2013	—	—	—	—	—	—	—	—	—	—		Non-album singles
"Ricos Besos"	2014	—	—	—	—	—	—	—	—	—	—		Non-album singles
"Si Te Confieso"	2014	—	—	—	—	—	—	—	—	—	—		Non-album singles
"Ya No Te Creo"	2015	—	—	—	—	—	—	—	—	—	—		Non-album singles
"Te Lo Quiero Hacer" (featuring De la Ghetto)	2015	—	—	—	—	—	—	—	—	—	—		Non-album singles
"Dime" (featuring Andy Rivera)	2015	—	—	—	—	—	—	—	—	—	—		Non-album singles
"Casi Nada"	2016	—	—	—	—	—	—	90	—	—	33	RIAA: Platinum (Latin)	Unstoppable
"Muñeco de Lego"	2016	—	—	—	—	—	—	—	—	—	—		Unstoppable
"Hello" (with Ozuna)	2016	—	—	—	—	—	— (Note: "Hello" did not enter the Billboard Mexico Airplay chart, but peaked at number 43 on the Billboard Mexico Espanol Airplay chart.)	—	—	—	39	RIAA: 3× Platinum (Latin)	Unstoppable
"A Ella"	2017	—	—	—	—	—	—	—	—	—	— (Note: "A Ella" did not enter the Billboard Hot Latin Songs chart, but peaked at number 19 on the Billboard Latin Pop Songs chart.)	PROMUSICAE: Platinum; RIAA: 3× Platinum (Latin)	Unstoppable
"Ahora Me Llama" (with Bad Bunny)	2017	—	—	—	—	—	—	22	—	—	10	PROMUSICAE: 2× Platinum; RIAA: Diamond (Latin)	Unstoppable
"Eres Mi Todo" (featuring Kevin Roldan)	2017	—	—	—	—	—	—	—	—	—	—		Unstoppable
"Como Tú Ninguna" (with Lafame)	2017	—	—	—	—	—	—	—	—	—	—		Non-album single
"Mi Mala" (with Mau y Ricky or remix featuring Becky G, Lali and Leslie Grace)	2017	68	10	15	—	—	—	57	—	—	38	AMPROFON: 2× Platinum+Gold; ASINCOL: Gold; CAPIF: Gold; PROMUSICAE: Gold; RIAA: 3× Platinum (Latin)	Para Aventuras y Curiosidades
"La Dama" (featuring Cosculluela)	2017	—	—	—	—	—	—	—	—	—	—		Unstoppable
"Pineapple"	2018	57	—	15	—	—	—	59	—	—	49	PROMUSICAE: Platinum; RIAA: 3× Platinum (Latin)	Ocean
"Tu Pum Pum" (with Shaggy featuring El Capitaan and Sekuence)	2018	—	—	73	—	—	— (Note: "Tu Pum Pum" did not enter the Billboard Mexico Airplay chart, but peaked at number 33 on the Billboard Mexico Espanol Airplay chart.)	—	—	—	—	RIAA: Gold (Latin)	Non-album single
"Princesa" (with Tini)	2018	—	69	14	—	—	8	—	—	—	— (Note: "Princesa" did not enter the Billboard Hot Latin Songs chart, but peaked at number 49 on the Billboard Latin Airplay chart.)	CAPIF: Gold	Quiero Volver
"Mi Cama" (solo or with J Balvin featuring Nicky Jam)	2018	10	10	78	—	—	38	5	—	— (Note: "Mi Cama (Remix)" did not enter the Billboard Hot 100, but peaked at number five on the Billboard Bubbling Under Hot 100 chart.)	6	AMPROFON: Platinum; PROMUSICAE: 3× Platinum; RIAA: Diamond (Latin)	Ocean
"Dicen" (with Antonio Orozco)	2018	—	—	—	—	—	—	70	—	—	—	PROMUSICAE: Platinum	Non-album singles
"Dame Tu Cosita" (with Pitbull and El Chombo featuring Cutty Ranks)	2018	—	31	—	—	—	—	—	—	36	1	RIAA: 7× Platinum (Latin)	Non-album singles
"Culpables" (with Anuel AA)	2018	32	14	—	—	—	— (Note: "Culpables" did not enter the Billboard Mexico Airplay chart, but peaked at number 46 on the Billboard Mexico Espanol Airplay chart.)	19	—	— (Note: "Culpables" did not enter the Billboard Hot 100, but peaked at number 17 on the Billboard Bubbling Under Hot 100 Singles chart.)	8	PROMUSICAE: 2× Platinum; RIAA: 10× Platinum (Latin)	Ocean
"Créeme" (with Maluma)	2018	25	12	7	—	—	— (Note: "Créeme" did not enter the Billboard Mexico Airplay chart, but peaked at number 21 on the Billboard Mexico Espanol Airplay chart.)	33	—	— (Note: "Créeme" did not enter the Billboard Hot 100, but peaked at number twenty on the Billboard Bubbling Under Hot 100 Singles chart.)	11	PROMUSICAE: 2× Platinum; RIAA: 3× Platinum (Latin)	Ocean
"Secreto" (with Anuel AA)	2019	5	3	6	—	34	— (Note: "Secreto" did not enter the Billboard Mexico Airplay chart, but peaked at number 36 on the Billboard Mexico Espanol Airplay chart.)	1	65	68	4	FIMI: Platinum; PROMUSICAE: 4× Platinum; RIAA: Diamond (Latin)	Emmanuel
"Hijoepu*#" (with Gloria Trevi)	2019	8	16	33	—	—	37	—	—	—	— (Note: "Hijoepu*#" did not enter the Billboard Latin Airplay chart, but peaked at number 29 on the Billboard Latin Pop Songs chart.)	RIAA: Gold (Latin)	Diosa De La Noche
"Punto G"	2019	83	73	33	—	—	—	33	—	—	30	AMPROFON: Platinum; PROMUSICAE: Platinum	Ocean
"Ocean"	2019	—	32	—	—	—	— (Note: "Ocean" did not enter the Billboard Mexico Airplay chart, but peaked at number 40 on the Billboard Mexico Espanol Airplay chart.)	25	—	—	22	AMPROFON: 2× Diamond+4× Platinum+Gold; PROMUSICAE: 2× Platinum	Ocean
"Love with a Quality" (featuring Damian Marley)	2019	75	—	98	—	—	—	—	—	—	—		Ocean
"Dices Que Te Vas" (featuring Anuel AA)	2019	—	67	—	—	—	—	—	—	—	47		Ocean
"Tú No Amas" (with Mambo Kingz, DJ Luian, Anuel AA and Arcángel)	2019	—	—	—	—	—	—	—	—	—	—	PROMUSICAE: Gold; RIAA: 8× Platinum (Latin)	Non-album single
"China" (with Anuel AA, Daddy Yankee, Ozuna and J Balvin)	2019	1	1	3	47	15	1	1	10	43	1	AMPROFON: Diamond+2× Platinum+Gold; FIMI: 2× Platinum; PROMUSICAE: 8× Platinum; RIAA: Gold (Latin); SNEP: Gold	Emmanuel
"Deséame Suerte" (with Jhay Cortez)	2019	—	—	—	—	—	—	—	—	—	—	RIAA: Gold (Latin)	Famouz Reloaded
"Tusa" (with Nicki Minaj)	2019	1	1	1	6	10	3	1	8	42	1	AMPROFON: 21× Diamond+3× Platinum+Gold; CAPIF: 4× Platinum; FIMI: 2× Platinum; MC: 2× Platinum; PROMUSICAE: 9× Platinum; RIAA: 41× Platinum (Latin); SNEP: Diamond	KG0516
"—" denotes a title that was not released or did not chart in that territory

==== 2020s ====
List of singles as lead artist in the 2020s, showing year released, selected chart positions, certifications, and originating album
Title	Year	Peak chart positions										Certifications	Album
Title	Year	COL	ARG	FRA	ITA	MEX	SPA	SWI	US	US Latin	WW	Certifications	Album
"Follow" (with Anuel AA)	2020	56	68	—	—	—	9	—	—	17	—	PROMUSICAE: Platinum	Non-album single
"Ay, Dios Mío!"	2020	4	2	—	—	44	3	—	94	5	25	AMPROFON: 9× Diamond+Platinum+Gold; CAPIF: 2× Platinum; MC: Gold; PROMUSICAE: 3× Platinum; RIAA: 15× Platinum (Latin)	KG0516
"Caramelo" (Remix) (with Ozuna and Myke Towers)	2020	2	3	—	—	27	21	—	85	4	16	AMPROFON: Platinum; PROMUSICAE: 2× Platinum	Enoc
"Bichota"	2020	2	1	—	—	26	4	—	72	3	7	AMPROFON: 21× Diamond+3× Platinum; CAPIF: Platinum; MC: Platinum; PROMUSICAE: 4× Platinum; RIAA: 20× Platinum (Latin)	KG0516
"Location" (with Anuel AA and J Balvin)	2021	9	46	—	—	29	13	—	— (Note: "Location" did not enter the Billboard Hot 100, but peaked at number three on the Billboard Bubbling Under Hot 100 chart.)	6	63	AMPROFON: Diamond+Platinum+Gold; CAPIF: Gold; PROMUSICAE: Platinum; RIAA: 6× Platinum (Latin)	KG0516
"El Makinon" (with Mariah Angeliq)	2021	2	9	—	—	—	6	—	— (Note: "El Makinon" did not enter the Billboard Hot 100, but peaked at number four on the Billboard Bubbling Under Hot 100 chart.)	6	39	AMPROFON: 2× Diamond+4× Platinum; CAPIF: Platinum; PROMUSICAE: 3× Platinum; RIAA: 11× Platinum (Latin)	KG0516
"El Barco"	2021	30	—	—	—	—	51	—	—	19	—	AMPROFON: Platinum+Gold; PROMUSICAE: 2× Platinum; RIAA: 5× Platinum (Latin)	KG0516
"200 Copas"	2021	2	96	—	—	—	—	—	—	28	—	AMPROFON: 2× Platinum+Gold; PROMUSICAE: Platinum; RIAA: 3× Platinum (Latin)	KG0516
"Poblado (Remix)" (with J Balvin and Nicky Jam, featuring Crissin, Totoy El Frio and Natan & Shander)	2021	2	13	—	—	—	12	—	— (Note: "Poblado (Remix)" did not enter the Billboard Hot 100, but peaked at number 20 on the Billboard Bubbling Under Hot 100 Singles chart.)	11	47	AMPROFON: 3× Platinum+Gold; PROMUSICAE: Platinum	Jose
"Don't Be Shy" (with Tiësto)	2021	53	33	165	80	1	58	47	— (Note: "Don't Be Shy" did not enter the Billboard Hot 100, but peaked at number 24 on the Billboard Bubbling Under Hot 100 chart.)	—	55	FIMI: Platinum; MC: Platinum; PROMUSICAE: 3× Platinum; RIAA: Gold; SNEP: Gold	Drive
"Sejodioto"	2021	27	40	—	—	— (Note: "Sejodioto" did not enter the Billboard Mexico Airplay chart, but peaked at number 29 on the Billboard Mexico Espanol Airplay chart.)	42	—	— (Note: "Sejodioto" did not enter the Billboard Hot 100, but peaked at number eight on the Billboard Bubbling Under Hot 100 chart.)	9	96	CAPIF: Gold; PROMUSICAE: Platinum	Non-album single
"Friki" (with Feid)	2021	13	—	—	—	—	—	—	—	34	—	AMPROFON: Platinum; PROMUSICAE: Platinum; RIAA: 3× Platinum (Latin)	Inter Shibuya (Ferxxo Edition)
"Mamiii" (with Becky G)	2022	1	9	—	—	1	1	36	15	1	4	AMPROFON: Diamond+Platinum+Gold; FIMI: Gold; IFPI SWI: Gold; PROMUSICAE: 7× Platinum; RIAA: 23× Platinum (Latin); SNEP: Gold	Esquemas
"Un Viaje" (with Jotaerre, Alejo and Moffa)	2022	—	—	—	—	—	—	—	—	25	—		Non-album single
"Provenza"	2022	1	4	—	—	1	2	62	25	1	6	CAPIF: Platinum; FIMI: Gold; MC: 2× Platinum; PROMUSICAE: 9× Platinum; RIAA: 36× Platinum (Latin); SNEP: Gold	Mañana Será Bonito
"Gatúbela" (with Maldy)	2022	1	36	—	—	18	17	—	37	4	23	PROMUSICAE: 2× Platinum; RIAA: 13× Platinum (Latin)	Mañana Será Bonito
"Cairo" (with Ovy on the Drums)	2022	12	53	—	—	—	14	—	82	11	51	PROMUSICAE: 4× Platinum; RIAA: 4× Platinum (Latin)	Mañana Será Bonito
"X Si Volvemos" (with Romeo Santos)	2023	6	51	—	—	21	9	74	48	4	18	PROMUSICAE: 3× Platinum; RIAA: Gold (Latin)	Mañana Será Bonito
"TQG" (Note: "TQG" is also included on Shakira's album Las Mujeres Ya No Lloran.) (with Shakira)	2023	1	2	30	44	1	1	5	7	1	1	FIMI: Platinum; IFPI SWI: Gold; MC: 2× Platinum; PROMUSICAE: 9× Platinum; SNEP: Diamond	Mañana Será Bonito
"Mientras Me Curo del Cora"	2023	3	53	—	—	—	23	—	68	8	40	MC: Gold; PROMUSICAE: 3× Platinum	Mañana Será Bonito
"Amargura"	2023	1	97	—	—	—	16	—	85	14	71	MC: Platinum; PROMUSICAE: 5× Platinum	Mañana Será Bonito
"S91"	2023	4	97	—	—	—	22	—	45	6	43	PROMUSICAE: 2× Platinum; RIAA: 6× Platinum (Latin)	Mañana Será Bonito (Bichota Season)
"Tá OK (Remix)" (with Dennis, MC Kevin O Chris and Maluma)	2023	—	—	—	—	—	77	—	—	40	38	PROMUSICAE: Platinum	Non-album single
"Mi Ex Tenía Razón"	2023	1	17	—	—	13	14	—	22	1	13	PROMUSICAE: 2× Platinum; RIAA: 6× Platinum (Latin)	Mañana Será Bonito (Bichota Season)
"Qlona" (with Peso Pluma)	2023	1	17	—	—	3	7	—	28	1	7	FIMI: Gold; MC: Platinum; PROMUSICAE: 5× Platinum; RIAA: 7× Platinum (Latin); SNEP: Gold	Mañana Será Bonito (Bichota Season)
"Labios Mordidos" (with Kali Uchis)	2023	15	—	—	—	—	59	—	97	10	108		Orquídeas
"Contigo" (with Tiësto)	2024	7	34	—	—	22	7	58	61	3	24	PROMUSICAE: 2× Platinum	Non-album single
"Si Antes Te Hubiera Conocido"	2024	1	1	16	4	2	1	7	32	1	5	FIMI: 2× Platinum; MC: 2× Platinum; PROMUSICAE: 10× Platinum; SNEP: Diamond	Tropicoqueta
"+57" (with Feid and DFZM featuring Ovy on the Drums, J Balvin, Maluma, Ryan Castro and Blessd)	2024	1	62	—	—	—	4	82	62	4	20	PROMUSICAE: Gold	Non-album single
"Latina Foreva"	2025	63	45	—	—	—	13	79	66	3	55	PROMUSICAE: Platinum	Tropicoqueta
"Papasito"	2025	38	—	—	—	—	21	—	74	5	56	PROMUSICAE: Gold	Tropicoqueta
"Única" (with Tainy)	2025	20	—	—	—	—	—	—	—	14	—		Non-album single
"Ivonny Bonita"	2025	21	—	—	—	—	41	—	— (Note: "Ivonny Bonita" did not enter the Billboard Hot 100, but peaked at number 11 on the Billboard Bubbling Under Hot 100 chart.)	13	141	PROMUSICAE: Gold	Tropicoqueta
"Después de Ti" (with Greg Gonzalez)	2026	71	—	—	—	—	—	—	96	6	—		No Me Arrepiento de Sentir Tanto
"Viajando Por el Mundo"	2026	—	—	—	—	—	63	—	—	38	—		Tropicoqueta
"Matadora"	2026	13	—	—	—	—	32	—	58	3	84		No Me Arrepiento de Sentir Tanto
"Still" (with Bruno Mars)	2026	— (Note: "Still" did not enter the Billboard Colombia Hot 100, but it peaked at number 12 on the Monitor Latino Colombia Anglo Airplay chart.)	— (Note: "Still" did not enter the Billboard Argentina Hot 100, but it peaked at number 14 on the Monitor Latino Argentina Airplay chart.)	—	—	—	—	—	41	—	124		No Me Arrepiento de Sentir Tanto
"Ahí" (with Drake)	2026	31	— (Note: "Ahí" did not enter the Billboard Argentina Hot 100, but it peaked at number one on the Monitor Latino Argentina Airplay chart.)	—	—	—	62	—	44	1	103		No Me Arrepiento de Sentir Tanto
"Bby Wow" (with Judeline and Rusowsky)	2026	1	1	42	5	1	1	1	6	1	1	PROMUSICAE: Platinum	No Me Arrepiento de Sentir Tanto
"—" denotes a title that was not released or did not chart in that territory

=== As featured artist ===
List of singles as a featured artist, showing year released, selected chart positions, certifications, and originating album
Title	Year	Peak chart positions									Certifications	Album
Title	Year	COL	ARG	CAN	FRA	MEX	SPA	SWI	US	US Latin	Certifications	Album
"301" (Reykon featuring Karol G)	2012	—	—	—	—	—	—	—	—	—		Non-album singles
"Mañana" (Andy Rivera featuring Karol G)	2014	—	—	—	—	—	—	—	—	—		Non-album singles
"Lo Que Siento por Ti" (Sebastián Yatra featuring Karol G)	2016	—	—	—	—	—	—	—	—	—		The Mixtape JukeBox, Vol. 1
"Caballero" (Moderatto featuring Karol G)	2018	—	—	—	—	26	—	—	—	—		Non-album single
"Peligrosa" (Lartiste featuring Karol G)	2019	—	—	—	94	—	—	—	—	—		Quartier Latin Vol. 1
"X" (Jonas Brothers featuring Karol G)	2020	93	—	42	—	26	—	79	33	—	MC: Gold	XV
"Miedito o Qué?" (Ovy on the Drums and Danny Ocean featuring Karol G)	2020	11	15	—	—	25	—	—	—	33	PROMUSICAE: Gold	Non-album single
"Vivo por Ella" (Andrea Bocelli featuring Karol G)	2024	18	—	—	—	—	48	—	—	41		Duets (30th Anniversary)
"No Me Cansare" (Sevdaliza featuring Karol G)	2024	—	—	—	—	—	60	—	—	35		Heroina
"—" denotes a title that was not released or did not chart in that territory

=== Promotional singles ===
List of promotional singles
Title	Year	Peak chart positions				Certifications	Album
Title	Year	US Bub.	US Latin	SPA	WW	Certifications	Album
"A Solas"	2017	—	—	—	—		Unstoppable
"Find You" (Remix) (with Nick Jonas)	2017	—	—	—	—		Non-album single
"Calypso (Remix)" (with Luis Fonsi)	2018	—	11	—	—		Vida
"Vibra Continente" (with Leo Santana)	2019	—	—	—	—		Non-album single
"My Family" (with Migos, Snoop Dogg and Rock Mafia)	2019	—	—	—	—	RIAA: Gold	The Addams Family
"La Vida Continuó" (with Simone & Simaria)	2020	—	—	—	—	PMB: Platinum	Ocean
"Enjoy Yourself" (with Pop Smoke)	2020	—	—	—	—	BPI: Silver	Shoot for the Stars, Aim for the Moon
"No Te Deseo El Mal" (with Eladio Carrión)	2021	—	29	17	—	PROMUSICAE: Platinum	Sauce Boyz 2
"La Vida Es Una"	2022	—	—	—	—		Puss in Boots: The Last Wish
"Watati" (featuring Aldo Ranks)	2023	25	25	100	—	PROMUSICAE: Gold	Barbie the Album
"Qué Chimba De Vida"	2023	—	27	61	—	PROMUSICAE: Gold	Non-album singles
"Milagros"	2025	19	17	18	119	PROMUSICAE: Platinum	Non-album singles
"—" denotes a title that was not released or did not chart in that territory

== Other charted and certified songs ==
List of other charted songs, showing year released, selected chart positions, certifications, and originating album
Title	Year	Peak chart positions										Certifications	Album
Title	Year	COL	ARG	BOL	CAN	ECU	PER	SPA	US	US Latin	WW	Certifications	Album
"Déjalos Que Miren"	2021	—	—	—	—	—	—	—	—	—	—	RIAA: Gold (Latin)	KG0516
"Contigo Voy a Muerte" (featuring Camilo)	2021	—	—	—	—	—	—	100	—	— (Note: "Contigo Voy a Muerte" did not enter the US Hot Latin Songs chart, but peaked at number 14 on the Latin Digital Song Sales chart.)	—	AMPROFON: Gold; PROMUSICAE: Platinum; RIAA: Platinum (Latin)	KG0516
"DVD"	2021	—	—	—	—	—	—	—	—	—	—	RIAA: Gold (Latin)	KG0516
"Gato Malo" (with Nathy Peluso)	2021	—	—	—	—	—	—	—	—	—	—	PROMUSICAE: Gold; RIAA: Gold (Latin)	KG0516
"Odisea" (with Ozuna)	2021	—	—	—	—	—	—	—	—	—	—	RIAA: Gold (Latin)	KG0516
"Sola Es Mejor" (with Yandar & Yostin)	2021	—	—	—	—	—	—	—	—	—	—	RIAA: Gold (Latin)	KG0516
"Beautiful Boy" (with Ludacris and Emilee)	2021	—	—	—	—	—	—	—	—	—	—	RIAA: Gold (Latin)	KG0516
"Leyendas" (with Wisin & Yandel and Nicky Jam featuring Ivy Queen, Zion and Alberto Stylee)	2021	—	—	—	—	—	—	—	—	— (Note: "Leyendas" did not enter the US Hot Latin Songs chart, but peaked at number 7 on the Latin Digital Song Sales chart.)	—	AMPROFON: Gold; RIAA: Platinum (Latin)	KG0516
"Pero Tú" (with Quevedo)	2023	10	—	—	—	—	—	12	86	14	69	PROMUSICAE: 2× Platinum; RIAA: Gold; RIAA: 9× Platinum (Latin)	Mañana Será Bonito
"Besties"	2023	19	—	—	—	—	—	66	96	17	118	PROMUSICAE: Gold	Mañana Será Bonito
"Gucci los Paños"	2023	18	—	—	—	—	—	79	71	9	90	PROMUSICAE: Gold	Mañana Será Bonito
"Tus Gafitas"	2023	9	—	—	—	—	—	41	73	10	70	PROMUSICAE: Gold	Mañana Será Bonito
"Ojos Ferrari" (with Justin Quiles and Ángel Dior)	2023	23	—	—	—	—	—	75	95	16	156	PROMUSICAE: Gold	Mañana Será Bonito
"Mercurio"	2023	—	—	—	—	—	—	94	— (Note: "Mercurio" did not enter the Billboard Hot 100, but peaked at number 18 on the Billboard Bubbling Under Hot 100 chart.)	26	—		Mañana Será Bonito
"Kármika" (with Bad Gyal and Sean Paul)	2023	21	—	—	—	—	—	19	— (Note: "Kármika" did not enter the Billboard Hot 100, but peaked at number 17 on the Billboard Bubbling Under Hot 100 chart.)	25	169	PROMUSICAE: Platinum	Mañana Será Bonito
"Carolina"	2023	—	—	—	—	—	—	—	—	33	—	PROMUSICAE: Gold	Mañana Será Bonito
"Dañamos la Amistad" (with Sech)	2023	—	—	—	—	—	—	70	—	29	—		Mañana Será Bonito
"Mañana Será Bonito" (with Carla Morrison)	2023	12	—	—	—	—	—	76	98	19	98	PROMUSICAE: Gold; RIAA: 9× Platinum (Latin)	Mañana Será Bonito
"Bichota G"	2023	—	—	—	—	—	—	—	— (Note: "Bichota G" did not enter the Billboard Hot 100, but peaked at number nine on the Billboard Bubbling Under Hot 100 chart.)	26	—		Mañana Será Bonito (Bichota Season)
"Oki Doki"	2023	14	—	—	—	25	20	78	83	15	131	PROMUSICAE: Platinum	Mañana Será Bonito (Bichota Season)
"Una Noche en Medellín (Remix)" (with Cris MJ and Ryan Castro)	2023	7	—	—	—	24	—	62	68	12	68	PROMUSICAE: Gold; RIAA: 7× Platinum (Latin)	Mañana Será Bonito (Bichota Season)
"Me Tengo Que Ir" (with Kali Uchis)	2023	—	—	—	—	—	—	—	— (Note: "Me Tengo Que Ir" did not enter the Billboard Hot 100, but peaked at number one on the Billboard Bubbling Under Hot 100 chart.)	19	—		Mañana Será Bonito (Bichota Season)
"Gatita Gangster" (with Dei V)	2023	—	—	—	—	—	—	39	— (Note: "Gatita Gangster" did not enter the Billboard Hot 100, but peaked at number 12 on the Billboard Bubbling Under Hot 100 chart.)	29	—	PROMUSICAE: 2× Platinum	Mañana Será Bonito (Bichota Season)
"Dispo" (with Young Miko)	2023	20	—	—	—	—	—	70	— (Note: "Dispo" did not enter the Billboard Hot 100, but peaked at number three on the Billboard Bubbling Under Hot 100 chart.)	22	174	PROMUSICAE: Gold	Mañana Será Bonito (Bichota Season)
"Provenza (Remix)" (with Tiësto)	2023	—	—	—	—	—	—	—	—	36	—		Mañana Será Bonito (Bichota Season)
"La Reina Presenta"	2025	—	—	—	—	—	—	—	—	48	—		Tropicoqueta
"Dile Luna" (with Eddy Lover)	2025	17	—	—	—	—	—	57	— (Note: "Dile Luna" did not enter the Billboard Hot 100, but peaked at number 17 on the Billboard Bubbling Under Hot 100 chart.)	17	183		Tropicoqueta
"Cuando Me Muera Te Olvido"	2025	24	—	—	—	—	—	62	—	21	—		Tropicoqueta
"Coleccionando Heridas" (with Marco Antonio Solís)	2025	9	—	17	—	7	12	49	— (Note: "Coleccionando Heridas" did not enter the Billboard Hot 100, but peaked at number 3 on the Billboard Bubbling Under Hot 100 chart.)	11	70		Tropicoqueta
"Un Gatito Me Llamó"	2025	—	—	—	—	—	—	83	—	20	—		Tropicoqueta
"Amiga Mía" (with Greeicy)	2025	13	—	—	—	—	—	45	—	18	175		Tropicoqueta
"Bandida Entrenada"	2025	—	—	—	—	—	—	97	—	29	—		Tropicoqueta
"Ese Hombre Es Malo"	2025	—	—	—	—	—	—	—	—	28	—		Tropicoqueta
"A Su Boca La Amo (Interlude)"	2025	—	—	—	—	—	—	—	—	46	—		Tropicoqueta
"Verano Rosa" (with Feid)	2025	6	—	—	—	9	—	11	96	9	64		Tropicoqueta
"No Puedo Vivir Sin Él"	2025	25	—	—	—	—	—	—	—	31	—		Tropicoqueta
"Tu Perfume"	2025	23	—	—	—	—	—	71	—	24	—		Tropicoqueta
"FKN Movie" (with Mariah Angeliq)	2025	—	—	—	—	—	—	—	—	32	—		Tropicoqueta
"Se Puso Linda"	2025	—	—	—	—	—	—	92	—	44	—		Tropicoqueta
"Tropicoqueta"	2025	—	—	—	—	—	—	76	—	37	—		Tropicoqueta
"Te Llevas To'"	2026	59	—	—	—	—	—	71	— (Note: "Te Llevas To'" did not enter the Billboard Hot 100, but peaked at number 3 on the Billboard Bubbling Under Hot 100 chart.)	6	—		No Me Arrepiento de Sentir Tanto
"Maybe"	2026	75	—	—	—	—	—	—	— (Note: "Maybe" did not enter the Billboard Hot 100, but peaked at number 23 on the Billboard Bubbling Under Hot 100 chart.)	12	—		No Me Arrepiento de Sentir Tanto
"Bebiendo Lágrimas"	2026	81	—	—	—	—	—	88	— (Note: "Bebiendo Lágrimas" did not enter the Billboard Hot 100, but peaked at number 20 on the Billboard Bubbling Under Hot 100 chart.)	11	—		No Me Arrepiento de Sentir Tanto
"Ahí" (with Drake)	2026	31	—	—	86	—	—	62	44	1	103		No Me Arrepiento de Sentir Tanto
"Final Feliz"	2026	95	—	—	—	—	—	—	—	14	—		No Me Arrepiento de Sentir Tanto
"Alguien Que Te Amaba"	2026	94	—	—	—	—	—	—	— (Note: "Alguien Que Te Amaba" did not enter the Billboard Hot 100, but peaked at number 12 on the Billboard Bubbling Under Hot 100 chart.)	9	—		No Me Arrepiento de Sentir Tanto
"For U My Lova"	2026	—	—	—	—	—	—	97	— (Note: "For U My Lova" did not enter the Billboard Hot 100, but peaked at number 24 on the Billboard Bubbling Under Hot 100 chart.)	13	—		No Me Arrepiento de Sentir Tanto
"Si Lo Ven"	2026	70	—	—	—	—	—	—	— (Note: "Si Lo Ven" did not enter the Billboard Hot 100, but peaked at number 9 on the Billboard Bubbling Under Hot 100 chart.)	8	—		No Me Arrepiento de Sentir Tanto
"Con Quién Andará?"	2026	34	—	—	—	—	—	93	—	15	—		No Me Arrepiento de Sentir Tanto
"Eclipse"	2026	—	—	—	—	—	—	—	—	18	—		No Me Arrepiento de Sentir Tanto
"—" denotes a title that was not released or did not chart in that territory
