= Punto G =

Punto G (Spanish for "G spot") may refer to:

- "Punto G" (Karol G song), 2019
- "Punto G" (Quevedo song), 2022
