= Culpables (Karol G and Anuel AA song) =

Single by Karol G and Anuel AA

from the album Ocean
- Language: Spanish
- English title: "Guilty"
- Released: September 13, 2018
- Genre: Latin trap
- Length: 3:46
- Label: Universal Music Latino
- Songwriters: Karol G; Anuel AA; Daniel Echavarria Oviedo; Chris Jedi; Juan G. Rivera Vazquez; Luis E. Ortiz Rivera
- Producers: Chris Jedi; Gaby Music

Karol G singles chronology
"Calypso" (2018)	"Culpables" (2018)	"Dame Tu Cosita (Remix)" (2018)

Anuel AA singles chronology
"Asesina (Remix)" (2018)	"Culpables" (2018)	"Que Seria" (2018)

Music video
- "Culpables" on YouTube

"Culpables" (transl. "Guilty") is a song by Colombian singer Karol G and Puerto Rican rapper Anuel AA. Written alongside Ovy on the Drums, Luis Ortiz Rivera, Chris Jedi and Gaby Music, and produced by the latter two, the song was released on September 13, 2018, as the third single from Karol G's second studio album, Ocean.

== Background ==
The song was first teased by Karol G's social media accounts on August 21, 2018, with a post captioning the song title. The song continued to be teased through the singer's social media accounts and was officially announced to feature Anuel AA through a video where she sang through his verse. The song was released on September 13, 2018

== Composition ==
The initial idea for a collaboration between Karol G and Anuel AA was first talked about following the success of Giraldo's "Ahora Me Llama" in 2017. The singer was looking for an artist to remix the song and was in talks with the rapper, but was impossible to record due to his being in jail at that time. Soon after the rapper's release in July 2018, Anuel AA desired to do a remix of her song "Pineapple", but Karol G said "it was too late", and suggested making a new song. While she was on tour, Anuel AA composed the song, then entitled "Infieles", and sent it to Karol G, who suggested the title "Culpables" instead.

== Commercial performance ==
On the US Billboard Hot Latin Songs chart dated for September 29, 2018, the song debuted at number 11, and reached its peak at number 8 on the chart dated for January 19, 2019.

== Awards and nominations ==
Awards and nominations for "Culpables"
Year	Ceremony	Category	Result
2019	Premios Tu Música Urbano	Collaboration of the Year	Nominated

== Music video ==
The music video for "Culpables" was directed by José Emilio Sagaró and was released on Karol G's YouTube channel on September 13, 2023.

== Charts ==
=== Weekly charts ===
Chart (2018–19)	Peak position
Argentina (Argentina Hot 100)	14
Colombia (National-Report)	32
Spain (PROMUSICAE)	6
US Hot Latin Songs (Billboard)	8

=== Year-end charts ===
Chart (2018)	Position
US Hot Latin Songs (Billboard)	75
Chart (2019)	Position
US Hot Latin Songs (Billboard)	36

== Certifications ==
Region	Certification	Certified units/sales
Peru	Gold	
Spain (Promusicae)	2× Platinum	120,000^{‡}
United States (RIAA)	Diamond (Latin)	600,000^{‡}
^{‡} Sales+streaming figures based on certification alone.
