= List of number-one albums of 2023 (Spain) =

Top 100 España is a record chart published weekly by PROMUSICAE (Productores de Música de España), a non-profit organization composed of Spanish and multinational record companies. This association tracks both physical (including CDs and vinyl) and digital (digital download and streaming) record consumption and sales in Spain.

== Albums ==
Week	Chart date	Album	Artist(s)	Ref
1	December 30	Corazon Y Flecha	Manuel Carrasco	
2	January 6	Un Verano Sin Ti	Bad Bunny	
3	January 13	Un Verano Sin Ti	Bad Bunny	
4	January 20	Donde Quiero Estar	Quevedo	
5	January 27	Donde Quiero Estar	Quevedo	
6	February 3	Donde Quiero Estar	Quevedo	
7	February 10	Donde Quiero Estar	Quevedo	
8	February 17	Donde Quiero Estar	Quevedo	
9	February 24	Mañana Será Bonito	Karol G	
10	March 3	Mañana Será Bonito	Karol G	
11	March 10	Donde Quiero Estar	Quevedo	
12	March 17	3men2 Kbrn	Eladio Carrión	
13	March 24	Bellodrama	Ana Mena	
14	March 31	Donde Quiero Estar	Quevedo	
15	April 7	Donde Quiero Estar	Quevedo	
16	April 14	El Dragón	Lola Índigo	
17	April 21	Donde Quiero Estar	Quevedo	
18	April 28	Donde Quiero Estar	Quevedo	
19	May 5	Donde Quiero Estar	Quevedo	
20	May 12	Donde Quiero Estar	Quevedo	
21	May 19	Donde Quiero Estar	Quevedo	
22	May 26	Greta Garbo	Bunbury	
23	June 2	Donde Quiero Estar	Quevedo	
24	June 9	Donde Quiero Estar	Quevedo	
25	June 16	Donde Quiero Estar	Quevedo	
26	June 23	Donde Quiero Estar	Quevedo	
27	June 30	Data	Tainy	
28	July 7	Speak Now (Taylor's Version)	Taylor Swift	
29	July 14	Donde Quiero Estar	Quevedo	
30	July 21	Donde Quiero Estar	Quevedo	
31	July 28	Donde Quiero Estar	Quevedo	
32	August 4	Donde Quiero Estar	Quevedo	
33	August 11	Mañana Será Bonito (Bichota Season)	Karol G	
34	August 18	Mañana Será Bonito (Bichota Season)	Karol G	
35	August 25	Estrella	Mora	
36	September 1	Estrella	Mora	
37	September 8	Guts	Olivia Rodrigo	
38	September 15	Estrella	Mora	
39	September 22	Alpha	Aitana	
40	September 29	Me Siento Vivo	David Bisbal	
41	October 6	Alpha	Aitana	
42	October 13	Nadie Sabe Lo Que Va a Pasar Mañana	Bad Bunny	
43	October 20	Nadie Sabe Lo Que Va a Pasar Mañana	Bad Bunny	
44	October 27	1989 (Taylor's Version)	Taylor Swift	
45	November 3	Nadie Sabe Lo Que Va a Pasar Mañana	Bad Bunny	
46	November 10	20 Años Sin Noticias	Melendi	
47	November 17	Nadie Sabe Lo Que Va a Pasar Mañana	Bad Bunny	
48	November 24	Sonrie porque estás en la foto	Sergio Dalma	
49	December 1	Desbarajuste Piramidal	El Último de la Fila	
50	December 8	A Todo Si	Malú	
51	December 15	Se Nos Lleva el Aire	Robe	
52	December 22	Se Nos Lleva el Aire	Robe	
1	December 29	Desbarajuste Piramidal	El Último de la Fila	
