= Ocean (Karol G album) =

Studio album by Karol G
- Released: May 3, 2019
- Recorded: 2018–2019
- Genre: Reggaeton
- Length: 50:57
- Language: Spanish
- Label: Universal Latin
- Producers: Andrés Torres; Andy Clay; Bull Nene; Chris Jedi; Cristian Colon; Danay Suárez; DJ Luian; EQ el Equalizer; Gaby Music; Jumbo; Keityn; Lexuz; Mambo Kingz; Mauricio Rengifo; Miguel Perez; Ovy on the Drums; Rayito; Shakal; Sky Rompiendo

Karol G chronology
Unstoppable (2017)	Ocean (2019)	KG0516 (2021)

Singles from Ocean
- 1. "Pineapple" Released: March 1, 2018; 2. "Mi Cama" Released: May 11, 2018; 3. "Culpables" Released: September 13, 2018; 4. "Créeme" Released: November 1, 2018; 5. "Punto G" Released: April 4, 2019; 6. "Ocean" Released: May 3, 2019; 7. "Love with a Quality" Released: May 9, 2019; 8. "Dices Que Te Vas" Released: May 30, 2019

Ocean is the second studio album by Colombian singer Karol G. It was released on May 3, 2019, through Universal Music Latino. Comprising sixteen tracks, the album is primarily a reggaetón and Latin pop record and features guest appearances by Damian Marley, Anuel AA, Simone & Simaria, Yandel, Maluma, J Balvin, Nicky Jam and Danay Suárez.

Ocean was supported by eight singles: "Pineapple", "Mi Cama" (solo or remixed with J Balvin and Nicky Jam), "Culpables" with Anuel AA, "Créeme" with Maluma, "Punto G", "Ocean", "Love with a Quality" with Damian Marley and "Dices Que Te Vas" with Anuel AA.

The album was met with generally positive reviews from music critics and was initially a moderate commercial success. It managed to chart within the top sixty on the mainstream US Billboard 200, and peaked at No. 2 on the US Top Latin Albums chart, selling 12,000 album-equivalent units in its first week.

== Background ==
Following the release of her debut studio album in 2017, Unstoppable, Karol G released "Mi Mala", collaboration with Mau y Ricky. On March 1, 2018, Karol G released "Pineapple", as the lead single for Ocean. Later that same month on March 29, 2018, "Tu Pum Pum" in collaboration with Shaggy, El Capitaan and Sekuence was released. "Princesa" with Tini was released on April 5, 2018. On May 11, 2018, "Mi Cama" was released as the second single from the album. Giraldo would later join on two remixed songs, including Luis Fonsi's "Calypso" and "Dame Tu Cosita", with El Chombo, Pitbull and Cutty Ranks. "Culpables" with Anuel AA was released on September 13, 2018, as the album's third single. "Créeme" with Maluma was released as the fourth single on November 1, 2018.

The following year Giraldo would release two collaborative songs as a lead artist, including "Secreto" with Anuel AA on January 15, 2019, and "Hijoepu*#" with Gloria Trevi on March 15, 2019. "Punto G" was released on April 4, 2019, as the fifth and last single prior to the release of the album.

On April 21, 2019, Karol G teased the album's name through an Instagram post. On April 26, 2019, she announced the release of the album, revealing its title and release date. Ocean was officially released on May 3, 2019, alongside the album's sixth single of the same name.

== Release and promotion ==
The album was released on May 3, 2019, through Universal Music Latino. It was released on CD, vinyl, digital download and streaming.

"Pineapple" was performed by Karol G on May 1, 2018, at La Voz Kids Colombia. "Mi Cama" was performed at the Urban Color Fest Trujillo on August 24, 2018. The song was performed once again at the 19th Annual Latin Grammy Awards on November 15, 2018. "Créeme" was performed through Vevo's Live Performance series on YouTube on December 7, 2018. From March 15 to May 31, 2019, Karol G embarked on the "Culpables Tour", alongside Anuel AA. "Pineapple", "Mi Cama", "Culpables" and "Créeme" were performed. On May 1, 2019, Giraldo performed "Pineapple", "Punto G" and "Go Karo" through Vevo's Live Performance series. "Punto G" was performed on May 13, 2019, at the Heat Latin Music Awards and later on June 23, 2019, at the MTV MIAW Awards. Through 2019, multiple songs were performed through various musical festivals, including Festival Catrina, PicNic Festival and En Pal Norte Festival. On November 2, 2019, "Mi Cama" was performed on Wild 'n Out. In 2020, "Ocean", "Culpables", "Pineapple", were performed through Bud Light Seltzer Sessions.

=== Singles ===
"Pineapple" was released on March 1, 2018, as the album's lead single. It peaked inside the top fifty of the US Hot Latin Songs.

"Mi Cama" was released on May 11, 2018, as the second single. It peaked inside the top ten of the US Hot Latin Songs at number 6 and was certified RIAA Latin Diamond.

"Culpables" with Puerto Rican rapper Anuel AA was released as the album's third single on September 12, 2018. It peaked inside the top ten of the US Hot Latin Songs at number 8 and was certified RIAA Latin Diamond.

"Créeme" with Colombian singer Maluma was released on November 1, 2018, as the fourth single. It peaked inside the top twenty of the US Hot Latin Songs.

"Punto G" was released on April 4, 2019, as the fifth single. It peaked inside the top thirty of the US Hot Latin Songs.

"Ocean" was released on May 3, 2019, as the album's sixth single. It peaked inside the top thirty of the US Hot Latin Songs.

"Love with a Quality" with Damian Marley was released as the seventh single on May 9, 2019.

"Dices Que Te Vas" with Anuel AA was released as the album's eight and last single on May 30, 2019.

=== Promotional singles ===
"La Vida Continuó" featuring Simone & Simaria was released as the album's first promotional single on April 28, 2020.

== Critical reception ==
Professional ratings
Review scores
Source	Rating
AllMusic	4/5 stars
Rolling Stone	3/5 stars

Elias Leight of Rolling Stone said, "The power of Ocean is somewhat diminished by the fact that a third of these songs are already out" but that "the remaining tracks are impressively varied: Piano balladry ('Ocean'), throwback hip-hop, which no one in the Latin mainstream is making ('Yo Aprendí'), guitar balladry ('Dices Que Te Vas', which tests her fiancée Anuel AA’s vocal limits) and a collaboration with the Brazilian duo Simone & Simaria... All the different styles mean that Ocean feels center-less, but that's kind of the point: If you hope to conquer the globe, you have to be all things to all people."

== Commercial performance ==
Ocean debuted at number two on the US Top Latin Albums chart, earning 12,000 album-equivalent units (including 2,000 copies in pure album sales) in its first week. This became Karol G's second top-ten debut on the chart. The album also debuted at number 54 on the US Billboard 200 and number two on the US Latin Rhythm Albums charts respectively. In addition, the album accumulated a total of 10.9 million on-demand audio streams for its songs. On September 12, 2019, the album was certified five times platinum by the Latin Recording Industry Association of America (RIAA) for combined sales and album-equivalent units of over 300,000 units in the United States.

== Track listing ==
Credits were adapted from Apple Music and Genius.

Ocean
No.	Title	Writer(s)	Producer(s)	Length
1.	"Ocean"	Carolina Giraldo; Carlos Morales; Daniel Echavarría Oviedo; Jorge Valdés Vázquez	Ovy on the Drums	2:33
2.	"Punto G"	Giraldo; Andy Clay; Antonio Rayo	Andy Clay; Rayito	3:01
3.	"Love with a Quality" (featuring Damian Marley)	Giraldo; Damian Marley; Oviedo	Ovy on the Drums	3:41
4.	"Baby"	Giraldo; Alejandro Ramirez	Sky Rompiendo	3:58
5.	"Sin Corazón"	Giraldo; Cristian Colon; Luian Malavé Nieves; Oviedo; Miguel Perez; Ervin Quiroz; Héctor Ramos; Emmanuel Santiago; Edgar Semper; Xavier Semper	DJ Luian; Mambo Kingz; EQ el Equalizer; Cristian Colon; Miguel Perez; Cris Serrano	2:49
6.	"Dices Que Te Vas" (featuring Anuel AA)	Giraldo; Santiago; José Gazmey Santiago	Ovy on the Drums	3:23
7.	"Pineapple"	Giraldo; Ricardo Montaner; Mauricio Montaner; Ramirez	Sky Rompiendo	2:58
8.	"La Vida Continuó" (featuring Simone & Simaria)	Giraldo; Oviedo; Rafael Silva de Queiroz; Kristopher Salazar	Ovy on the Drums	2:45
9.	"Bebesita"	Giraldo; Jorge Cedeño Echevarria; Joan Gonzalez; Carlos Ortiz; Juan Rivera; Miguel Antonio Muñoz Rohena; Santiago	Chris Jedi; Gaby Music	3:02
10.	"Culpables" (with Anuel AA)	Giraldo; Ortiz; Oviedo; Rivera; Santiago	Jeday	3:46
11.	"Mi Cama"	Giraldo; Clay; René Cano; Rayo; Omar Sabino	Clay; Rayito	2:30
12.	"La Ocasión Perfecta" (featuring Yandel)	Giraldo; Llandel Veguilla; Oviedo; Victor Viera	Ovy on the Drums; Jumbo	3:41
13.	"Créeme" (with Maluma)	Giraldo; Juan Luis Londoño Arias; Cano; Filly Shakal Lima; Kevyn Mauricio Cruz Moreno; Juan Camilo Vargas; Lenin Yorney	Lexuz; Bull Nene; Keityn; Shakal	3:32
14.	"Go Karo"	Giraldo; Pato Banton; Oviedo	Ovy on the Drums	2:28
15.	"Mi Cama (Remix)" (with J Balvin featuring Nicky Jam)	Giraldo; José Álvaro Osorio Balvín; Nick Rivera; Clay; Cano; Jesús Nieves Cortés; Juan Diego Medina; Rayo; Sabino	Clay; Rayito	3:15
16.	"Yo Aprendí" (featuring Danay Suárez)	Giraldo; Danay Suárez	Danay Suárez	3:05
Total length:				50:57

== Charts ==
=== Weekly charts ===
Chart (2019)	Peak position
Spanish Albums (PROMUSICAE)	82
US Billboard 200	54
US Top Latin Albums (Billboard)	2
US Latin Rhythm Albums (Billboard)	2

=== Year-end charts ===
Chart (2019)	Position
US Top Latin Albums (Billboard)	14
Chart (2020)	Position
US Top Latin Albums (Billboard)	26
Chart (2021)	Position
US Top Latin Albums (Billboard)	39

== Certifications ==
Region	Certification	Certified units/sales
Argentina (CAPIF)	2× Diamond	270,000^{^}
Mexico (AMPROFON)	2× Diamond+2× Platinum	720,000^{‡}
United States (RIAA)	5× Platinum (Latin)	300,000^{‡}
^{^} Shipments figures based on certification alone.^{‡} Sales+streaming figures based on certification alone.
