= Mañana Será Bonito (Bichota Season) =

Mixtape by Karol G
- Released: August 11, 2023
- Genre: Reggaeton; Latin trap
- Length: 30:06
- Language: Spanish
- Label: Bichota; Interscope
- Producer: Édgar Barrera; Eduardo Burgos; Fran C; Mag; Ovy on the Drums; Sky Rompiendo; Taiko; Tiësto

Karol G chronology
Mañana Será Bonito (2023)	Mañana Será Bonito (Bichota Season) (2023)	Tropicoqueta (2025)

Singles from Mañana Será Bonito (Bichota Season)
- 1. "S91" Released: July 13, 2023; 2. "Mi Ex Tenía Razón" Released: August 11, 2023; 3. "Qlona" Released: September 6, 2023

Mañana Será Bonito (Bichota Season) (transl. "Tomorrow Will Be Beautiful (Bichota Season)") is the second mixtape by Colombian singer Karol G. It was released on August 11, 2023, through Bichota Records and Interscope. Comprising ten tracks, the album features guest appearances by Peso Pluma, Cris MJ, Ryan Castro, Kali Uchis, Dei V, Young Miko and Tiësto.

Mañana Será Bonito (Bichota Season) was supported by three singles: "S91", "Mi Ex Tenía Razón" and "Qlona" with Peso Pluma. The mixtape was a commercial success and became the second all-Spanish language album by a woman to reach the top three on the US Billboard 200, after her own Mañana Será Bonito, earning 67,000 album-equivalent units in its first week.

It was nominated for seven Latin Grammy Awards at the 25th annual ceremony, including Album of the Year and Best Urban Music Album, winning the latter.

== Background ==
Following the release of her fourth studio album in 2023, Mañana Será Bonito, Karol G announced the release of "S91" through her social media accounts. The song was released on July 13, 2023, as the mixtape's lead single. At the end of the accompanying video for "S91", the release of Mañana Será Bonito (Bichota Season) was teased. On July 31, 2023, Karol G announced the release date of the mixtape alongside its title and cover art. Mañana Será Bonito (Bichota Season) was released on August 11, 2023, set to coincide with the release of Karol G's upcoming concert tour, the Mañana Será Bonito Tour, before the first concert was moved a day earlier.

On August 7, 2023, Giraldo revealed the track list for the mixtape, featuring guest appearances from Peso Pluma, Cris MJ, Ryan Castro, Kali Uchis, Dei V, Young Miko and Tiësto. Mañana Será Bonito (Bichota Season) was officially released on August 11, 2023, alongside the second single from the mixtape, "Mi Ex Tenía Razón".

== Concept ==
The project was first thought as a deluxe edition for her previous fourth studio album, Mañana Será Bonito, before the decision was changed. In an interview with Apple Music, she revealed:

By then, the deluxe version did not make sense. I started listening to the music again and started seeing it as a cassette with an A-side and a B-side. Mañana Será Bonito was very beautiful, particularly after living a process of transition, change and evolution. With Bichota Season, I feel more free, self-confident, and empowered. I want to show my force and the grandiosity of what I have accomplished with so much sacrifice and work. That's Bichota Season for me, the evolution.

=== Title ===
The title Mañana Será Bonito (Bichota Season) references two previous Karol G projects: her album, Mañana Será Bonito, and "Bichota", a single from her third studio album, KG0516.

The phrase "Mañana Será Bonito", came from Karol G repeating it every day when she did not feel good. In an interview with Rolling Stone, she revealed: "The name of the album is a phrase I kept repeating to myself when nothing felt great. I mean, I was going through the best moment of my career, but personally I was really disconnected from myself and from my friends. I wasn't unhappy, but I wasn't happy either. So every day I'd say to myself, 'It's okay, mañana será bonito, tomorrow will be beautiful."

The word "Bichota" comes from the Puerto Rican slang "bichote". A "bichote" is an individual who due to his economic or political position, is considered important or influential, generally related to the sale of drugs. Despite this, Karol G gave the word a new meaning to her song, stating: "It's a moment of feeling sexy, flirtatious, daring, strong, empowered, and to a certain extent, translates into personal motivation and self-confidence. We are all super 'Bichotas' inside. It's about believing and working so that the rest of the world can see it too."

== Release and promotion ==
The album was released on August 11, 2023, through Bichota Records and Interscope. It was released on CD, vinyl, digital download and streaming. On August 4, 2023, Karol G headlined the Lollapalooza music festival in Chicago, where "S91" was performed for the first time. On August 10, 2023, Karol G embarked on the "Mañana Será Bonito Tour", promoting Mañana Será Bonito (Bichota Season) and Mañana Será Bonito. "Mi Ex Tenía Razón", among others from the mixtape, were performed on the tour for the first time. The arena-stadium tour lasted through July 23, 2024, and became the highest-grossing Latin tour of all time by a female artist. On November 19, 2023, Karol G performed a medley of songs, including "Qlona" at the Billboard Music Awards.

=== Singles ===
"S91" was released on July 13, 2023, as the album's lead single. It reached the top fifty of the US Billboard Hot 100 chart, at number 45. The song also reached the top ten of the US Billboard Hot Latin Songs.

"Mi Ex Tenía Razón" was released as the second single on August 11, 2023, alongside the album's release. It debuted at number 22 on the US Billboard Hot 100 chart, becoming the highest charting Spanish song by a female soloist. The song debuted at number one on the US Billboard Hot Latin Songs. It was nominated for Record of the Year and Song of the Year at the 25th Annual Latin Grammy Awards.

"Qlona" was released as the third and final single on September 6, 2023. It peaked at number 28 on the US Billboard Hot 100 chart. The song also reached the top spot of the US Billboard Hot Latin Songs.

== Critical reception ==
Professional ratings
Review scores
Source	Rating
NME	4/5 stars

Mañana Será Bonito (Bichota Season) was well received by Nick Levine from NME, stating: "With 10 tracks clocking in at a whisker over half an hour, Mañana Será Bonito (Bichota Season) is less substantial than its 52-minute sister album. However, the quality control is still sky-high. [On] this evidence, the sun won't be setting on Karol G's "bichota season" any time soon."

== Commercial performance ==
During the first day of release on Spotify, Mañana Será Bonito (Bichota Season) opened with 17.5 million streams on the Spotify Global chart and 18.7 million overall, breaking the record for the second debut for a Spanish-language album by a woman, previously held by Rosalía's Motomami, and only behind her own Mañana Será Bonito.

=== United States ===
Mañana Será Bonito (Bichota Season) debuted at number three on the US Billboard 200 chart, earning 67,000 album-equivalent units in its opening week, of which 17,000 came from pure sales, becoming Giraldo's second top three album on the chart. It became the third all-Spanish-language album by a woman to reach the top five on the Billboard 200 and second highest, surpassing Shakira's Fijación Oral, Vol. 1 and only behind her own Mañana Será Bonito.

== Accolades ==
Awards and nominations for Mañana Será Bonito (Bichota Season)
Year	Ceremony	Category	Result	Ref.
2024	Billboard Latin Music Awards	Top Latin Album of the Year	Nominated	
2024	Billboard Latin Music Awards	Latin Rhythm Album of the Year	Nominated	
2024	Heat Latin Music Awards	Album of the Year	Won	
2024	Latin Grammy Awards	Album of the Year	Nominated	
2024	Latin Grammy Awards	Best Urban Music Album	Won	
2024	Premios Juventud	Best Urban Album - Female	Won	
2024	Billboard Music Awards	Top Latin Album	Nominated	
2025	Premios Lo Nuestro	Urban Album of the Year	Won	

== Track listing ==
Mañana Será Bonito (Bichota Season) track listing
No.	Title	Writer(s)	Producer(s)	Length
1.	"Bichota G"	Carolina Giraldo Navarro; Alejandro Ramírez Suárez; Nicolas Ignacio Jaña	Sky Rompiendo^{[p]}; Taiko; Joel Iglesias^{[v]}	2:13
2.	"Oki Doki"	Giraldo; Jaña; Ramírez	Sky Rompiendo^{[p]}; Taiko; Iglesias^{[v]}	2:23
3.	"Mi Ex Tenía Razón"	Giraldo; Andrés Jael Correa Ríos; Edgar Barrera; Kevyn Mauricio Cruz Moreno; Marco Daniel Borrero	Edgar Barrera; Mag	2:34
4.	"S91"	Giraldo; Daniel Echavarria Oviedo; Kevyn Cruz	Ovy on the Drums	2:53
5.	"Qlona" (with Peso Pluma)	Giraldo; Hassan Emilio Kabande Laija; Echavarría; Daniel Esteban Gutiérrez	Ovy on the Drums	2:52
6.	"Una Noche en Medellín (Remix)" (with Cris MJ and Ryan Castro)	Giraldo; Christopher Andrés Álvarez García; Bryan David Castro Sosa; Francisco Eduardo Burgos Gallardo	Eduardo Burgos; Esteban Higuita Estrada^{[v]}	3:25
7.	"Me Tengo Que Ir" (with Kali Uchis)	Giraldo; Karly-Marina Loaiza; Ramírez	Sky Rompiendo^{[p]}; Iglesias^{[v]}; Austen Jux-Chandler^{[v]}	4:36
8.	"Gatita Gangster" (with Dei V)	Giraldo; Davis G. Juarbe; Jaña; Ramírez	Sky Rompiendo^{[p]}; Taiko; Iglesias^{[v]}	2:50
9.	"Dispo (Note: "Dispo" does not appear on physical copies of "Mañana Será Bonito (Bichota Season)".)" (with Young Miko)	Giraldo; María Victoria Ramírez de Arellano; Cruz; Diego López Crespo; Mariana Beatriz López Crespo	Ovy on the Drums	3:13
10.	"Provenza (Remix)" (with Tiësto)	Giraldo; Cruz; Echavarría	Tiësto	3:07
Total length:				30:06

Physical bonus track
No.	Title	Length
11.	"Un Clásico"

Notes

- ^{^[p]} signifies a primary and vocal producer.
- ^{^[v]} signifies a vocal producer.

== Personnel ==
Musicians

- Karol G – vocals
- Peso Pluma – vocals (track 5)
- Cris MJ – vocals (6)
- Ryan Castro – vocals (6)
- Kali Uchis – vocals (7)
- Dei V – vocals (8)
- Young Miko – vocals (9)
- Tiësto – DJ (10)

Technical

- Dave Kutch – mastering (1, 2, 4–10)
- Colin Leonard – mastering (3)
- Joel Iglesias – mixing, engineering (1, 2, 7, 8); vocal engineering (3)
- Josh Gudwin – mixing (1, 2, 7, 8)
- Mag – mixing (3)
- Rob Kinelski – mixing (4, 5, 9)
- Esteban Higuita Estrada – mixing (6)
- Luca Brown – engineering (7)
- Austen Jux-Chandler – engineering (7)
- Eli Heisler – mixing assistance (5, 9)

== Charts ==
=== Weekly charts ===
Weekly chart performance for Mañana Será Bonito (Bichota Season)
Chart (2023–2024)	Peak position
Canadian Albums (Billboard)	77
French Albums (SNEP)	139
Italian Albums (FIMI)	86
Portuguese Albums (AFP)	74
Spanish Albums (Promusicae)	1
Swiss Albums (Schweizer Hitparade)	12
US Billboard 200	3
US Top Latin Albums (Billboard)	1
US Latin Rhythm Albums (Billboard)	1

=== Year-end charts ===
Year-end chart performance for Mañana Será Bonito (Bichota Season)
Chart (2023)	Position
Spanish Albums (PROMUSICAE)	15
US Billboard 200	174
US Top Latin Albums (Billboard)	10

2024 year-end chart performance for Mañana Será Bonito (Bichota Season)
Chart (2024)	Position
Portuguese Albums (AFP)	188
Spanish Albums (PROMUSICAE)	10
US Billboard 200	103
US Top Latin Albums (Billboard)	7

== Certifications ==
Certifications for Mañana Será Bonito (Bichota Season)
Region	Certification	Certified units/sales
Spain (Promusicae)	2× Platinum	80,000^{‡}
United States (RIAA)	Gold	500,000^{‡}
^{‡} Sales+streaming figures based on certification alone.

== See also ==
- 2023 in Latin music
- List of number-one Billboard Latin Albums from the 2020s
- List of number-one Billboard Latin Rhythm Albums of 2023
- List of number-one albums of 2023 (Spain)
