= Dispo (song) =

Song by Karol G and Young Miko

from the album Mañana Será Bonito (Bichota Season)
- Language: Spanish
- English title: "Available"
- Released: August 11, 2023
- Genre: Reggaeton
- Length: 3:14
- Label: Bichota • Interscope
- Songwriter: Carolina Giraldo Navarro • Diego López Crespo • Kevyn Mauricio Cruz Moreno • María Victoria Ramírez de Arellano • Mariana Beatriz López Crespo • Daniel Echavarria Oviedo
- Producer: Ovy on the Drums

Visualizer
- "Dispo" on YouTube

"Dispo" (short for "Disponible"; English: Available) is a song by Colombian singer Karol G and Puerto Rican rapper Young Miko. It was released on August 11, 2023, through Bichota Records and Interscope, as the ninth track on the former's second mixtape project, Mañana Será Bonito (Bichota Season).

== Background and release ==
Karol G announced her mixtape Mañana Será Bonito (Bichota Season) scheduled to be released on August 11, 2023, and revealed the track list, and "Dispo" was included as the ninth track.

== Promotion ==
=== Visualizer ===
The audio visualizer premiered simultaneously with other audio visualizer videos with the release of Mañana Será Bonito (Bichota Season) on August 11, 2023.

=== Live performances ===
Days after the release of said Karol G mixtape, she performed the song live with Young Miko.
