= Ocean (Karol G song) =

2019 single by Karol G

Single by Karol G

from the album Ocean
- Language: Spanish
- Released: May 3, 2019
- Genre: Latin pop
- Length: 2:33
- Label: Universal Music Latino
- Songwriter(s): Carolina Giraldo; Carlos Morales; Jorge Valdés Vázquez; Ovy on the Drums
- Producer(s): Ovy On the Drums

Karol G singles chronology
"Punto G" (2019)	"Ocean" (2019)	"Love with a Quality" (2019)

Music video
- "Ocean" on YouTube

"Ocean" is a song by Colombian singer-songwriter Karol G. It was written by the singer herself, Carlos Morales, Jorge Valdés and Ovy On The Drums, and produced by the latter. The song was released on May 3, 2019 through Universal Music Latino, as the fifth single from her second studio album of the same name.

== Background ==
The song was announced hours priors with the release of the album through Karol G's social media accounts, with a snippet of the song and music video. The song was released simultaneously with the album on May 3, 2019. A remix featuring Canadian singer-songwriter Jessie Reyez was released on September 30, 2019.

== Critical reception ==
Thom Jurek of AllMusic stated: "Adding to the wealth of diversity to this attempt at Latin pop domination, the title track is a sumptuous, intimately wrought piano ballad."

Rolling Stone called the song "Impressively varied" in the wholesomeness of the album.

== Commercial performance ==
"Ocean" debuted at number 31 on the US Billboard Hot Latin Songs chart dated May 18, 2019. On it’s eighteen week, the song reached its peak of number 22 on the chart dated September 14, 2019.

The song received a double Diamond+4× Platinum+Gold certification on Mexico by AMPROFON on May 26, 2021, for sales of 870 thousand equivalent-units.

== Awards and nominations ==
Awards and nominations for "Ocean"
Year	Ceremony	Category	Result
2020	Premios Tu Música Urbano	Female Song of the Year	Nominated

== Music video ==
The music video for "Ocean" was self-directed by Karol G and was released on her YouTube channel on May 3, 2019. Both Karol G and her partner at the time Anuel AA star on the music video.

== Charts ==
=== Weekly charts ===
Weekly chart performance for "Ocean"
Chart (2019)	Peak position
Argentina (Argentina Hot 100)	32
Spain (PROMUSICAE)	25
US Hot Latin Songs (Billboard)	22
US Latin Pop Airplay (Billboard)	25
US Latin Rhythm Airplay (Billboard)	22

=== Year-end charts ===
Year-end chart performance for "Ocean"
Chart (2019)	Position
US Hot Latin Songs (Billboard)	69

== Certifications ==
Certifications for "Ocean"
Region	Certification	Certified units/sales
Brazil (Pro-Música Brasil)	Gold	20,000^{‡}
Mexico (AMPROFON)	2× Diamond+4× Platinum+Gold	870,000^{‡}
Spain (PROMUSICAE)	2× Platinum	120,000^{‡}
^{‡} Sales+streaming figures based on certification alone.
