= Créeme =

2018 single by Karol G and Maluma

Single by Karol G and Maluma

from the album Ocean
- Language: Spanish
- English title: "Believe Me"
- Released: November 1, 2018
- Genre: Latin pop
- Length: 3:32
- Label: Universal Latino
- Songwriters: Carolina Giraldo; Juan Luis Londoño Arias; Rene Cano; Filly Andrés; Kevyn Cruz; Juan Camilo Vargas; Lenin Yorney
- Producers: Rene Cano; Kevyn Cruz; Lexuz; Shakal

Karol G singles chronology
| "Dame Tu Cosita (Remix)" (2018) | "Créeme" (2018) | "Secreto" (2019) |

Maluma singles chronology
| "Arms Around You" (2018) | "Créeme" (2018) | "Vivir Bailando" (2019) |

Music video
- "Créeme" on YouTube

"Créeme" (transl. "Believe Me") is a song by Colombian singers-songwriters Karol G and Maluma. It was written by Karol G, Maluma, Filly Andrés, Juan Vargas, Lenin Yorney, Rene Cano and Kevyn Ceuz and produced by the latter two, Lexuz and Shakal. The song was released on November 1, 2018, through Universal Music Latino, as the fourth single from her second studio album Ocean.

== Background ==
The song was announced on October 26, 2018, through Karol G's social media accounts with the title and release date. A snippet of the song was shared on the following days. The song was released on November 1, 2018.

== Commercial performance ==
"Créeme" debuted at number 22 on the US Billboard Hot Latin Songs chart dated November 17, 2018. On its sixteenth week, the song reached its final peak of number 11 on the chart dated March 2, 2019.

== Awards and nominations ==
Awards and nominations for "Créeme"
| Year | Ceremony | Category | Result |
|---|---|---|---|
| 2019 | Premios Tu Música Urbano | International Artist Video | Nominated |
| 2020 | Premios Lo Nuestro | Pop/Rock Collaboration of the Year | Nominated |
| 2020 | Premios Lo Nuestro | Urban/Pop Song of the Year | Nominated |

== Music video ==
The music video for "Créeme" was directed by Jessy Terreno and was released on Karol G's YouTube channel on November 1, 2018.

== Charts ==
=== Weekly charts ===
Weekly chart performance for "Créeme"
| Chart (2018) | Peak position |
|---|---|
| Argentina Hot 100 (Billboard) | 12 |
| Spain (PROMUSICAE) | 33 |
| US Bubbling Under Hot 100 (Billboard) | 20 |
| US Hot Latin Songs (Billboard) | 11 |
| US Latin Airplay (Billboard) | 1 |
| US Latin Pop Airplay (Billboard) | 1 |
| US Latin Rhythm Airplay (Billboard) | 1 |

=== Year-end charts ===
Year-end chart performance for "Créeme"
| Chart (2019) | Position |
|---|---|
| US Hot Latin Songs (Billboard) | 40 |

== Certifications ==
Certifications for "Créeme"
| Region | Certification | Certified units/sales |
|---|---|---|
| Brazil (Pro-Música Brasil) | Platinum | 40,000^{‡} |
| Canada (Music Canada) | Gold | 40,000^{‡} |
| Colombia | Platinum | |
| Ecuador | Platinum | |
| Peru | Gold | |
| Spain (Promusicae) | 2× Platinum | 120,000^{‡} |
| United States (RIAA) | 3× Platinum (Latin) | 180,000^{‡} |
^{‡} Sales+streaming figures based on certification alone.
