= Danay Suárez =

Cuban singer

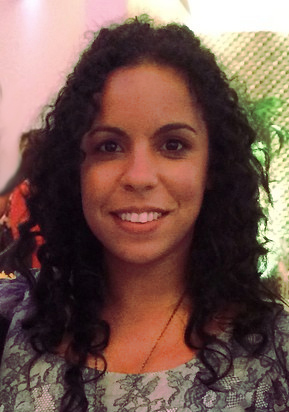
- Suárez in 2014

Background information
- Born: Danay Suárez Fernandez; 1985 (age 40–41); Havana, Cuba
- Genres: Boleros, world music, urban, reggae, jazz
- Occupations: Singer, rapper, songwriter
- Years active: 2008–present
- Website: danaysuarez.com

Danay Suárez (born Danay Suárez Fernández, c. 1985) is a Cuban R&B and hip hop singer. She has gained attention in Europe, mainly in France.

== Early life ==
Danay was born in Havana, Cuba, and was raised spending time in El Cerro and Buena Vista, barrios she describes as having social issues and conflicts.

== Career ==
She appeared at the Banlieues Bleues festival 8 April 2011 and has appeared on national television in France.

She got her start in the music industry in 2007 with a cold call to Cuban fusion king X-Alfonso. Her work with X-Alfonso led to her discovery a few years later by Gilles Peterson.

Gilles Peterson included her on the first Havana Cultura album. She has also released a CD under her name.

Billboard named her one of their 10 "up-and-coming" reggaeton artists in an August 2014 article.

In 2017, she was nominated for four Latin Grammys in various categories, including Best New Artist and Album of the Year.

== Musical style ==
Billboard magazine describes her music in 2017: "Her sound, a sonic fusion of what is considered American hip-hop and Jamaican reggae", noting it has taken the singer years to perfect her style.

== Discography ==
- Polvo de la Humedad (2011)
- Palabras manuales (2017)
- Vive (2021)
- CAMBIO (2024)
