= Unstoppable (Karol G album) =

Studio album by Karol G
- Released: October 27, 2017
- Recorded: 2014–2017
- Genre: Reggaeton
- Length: 51:43
- Language: Spanish
- Label: Universal Latino
- Producers: Andrés Torres; DJ Luian; Mauricio Rengifo; Montana The Producer; Mosty; Mueka; Ovy on the Drums

Karol G chronology
Super Single (2013)	Unstoppable (2017)	Ocean (2019)

Singles from Unstoppable
- 1. "Casi Nada" Released: March 4, 2016; 2. "Muñeco de Lego" Released: August 26, 2016; 3. "Hello" Released: November 4, 2016; 4. "A Ella" Released: May 5, 2017; 5. "Ahora Me Llama" Released: May 26, 2017; 6. "Eres Mi Todo" Released: July 6, 2017; 7. "La Dama" Released: December 21, 2017

Unstoppable is the debut studio album by Colombian singer Karol G. It was released on October 27, 2017, through Universal Music Latino. Comprising thirteen tracks, the album is primarily a reggaeton record and features guest appearances by Cosculluela, Ozuna, Bad Bunny, Kevin Roldán and Quavo.

Unstoppable was supported by seven singles: "Casi Nada", "Muñeco de Lego", "Hello" with Ozuna, "A Ella", "Ahora Me Llama" with Bad Bunny, "Eres Mi Todo" with Kevin Roldán and "La Dama" with Cosculluela.

The album was met with moderate commercial success. It debuted inside the US Billboard 200 and number two on the US Top Latin Albums.

== Background ==
After the commercial failure of her 2013 mixtape Super Single, Karol G finally gained traction with "Amor de Dos" in collaboration with Nicky Jam. The following year, Karol G released stand alone singles and started working on her debut album. In 2015, collaborative songs with De La Ghetto and Andy Rivera were released. In January 2016, Giraldo was signed with Universal Music Latin Entertainment.

Karol G began teasing the release of new music through her social media accounts a month prior. On March 10, 2016, Giraldo announced the official release date for "Casi Nada", sharing its official cover art. The song was released on March 18, 2016, as the album's lead single. On August 26, 2016, "Muñeco de Lego" was released as the second single. "Hello" with Puerto Rican rapper Ozuna, was released as the album's third single on November 4, 2016. "A Ella" was released on May 5, 2017, as the album's fifth single. "Ahora Me Llama" with Puerto Rican rapper and singer Bad Bunny was released on May 26, 2017. "Eres Mi Todo" with Kevin Roldán was released on July 6, 2017, as the last single prior to the album's release.

On October 11, 2017, Karol G announced the release date and title for her debut album, Unstoppable, through her social media accounts. The track list was revealed that same month on October 17, 2017, featuring guest appearances from Cosculluela, Ozuna, Bad Bunny, Kevin Roldán and Quavo. The album was officially released on October 27, 2017.

== Title ==
The title for the album comes after years of trying to stand out in the music industry for Karol G. In an interview, she explained:

This album is the result of many years of incredible experiences, knowledge, ups and downs that allowed me to see that only determination could help me achieve a place in this business. Sometimes you get what you want, sometimes you don't, but in the end you will always win. There is nothing that can stop me and I'm ready to take on and enjoy the ride. It's my motto; it's what I live by. I know what I want and I will be unstoppable until I get it!

== Release and promotion ==
The album was released on October 27, 2017, through Universal Music Latino. It was released on CD, vinyl, digital download and streaming.

=== Singles ===
"Casi Nada" was released on March 4, 2016, as the album's lead single. It peaked at number 33 on the US Hot Latin Songs.

"Muñeco de Lego" was released on August 26, 2016, as the second single.

"Hello" with Puerto Rican singer Ozuna was released as the album's third single on November 4, 2016. It peaked inside the top forty at number 39 on the US Hot Latin Songs.

"A Ella" was released on May 5, 2017, as the fourth single.

"Ahora Me Llama" with Puerto Rican rapper and singer Bad Bunny was released on May 26, 2017, as the fifth single. It peaked at number 10 of the US Hot Latin Songs and was certified RIAA Latin Diamond.

"Eres Mi Todo" with Colombian singer Kevin Roldán was released on July 6, 2017, as the album's sixth single.

"La Dama" with Cosculluela was released as the album's seventh and final single on December 21, 2017.

== Critical reception ==
Professional ratings
Review scores
Source	Rating
AllMusic	4/5 stars

Unstoppable was well received by Thom Jurek from AllMusic, stating: "The album is a manifesto of sorts that women don't have to merely be singers in the Latin pop arena or be restricted to dancefloor or arena pop. This album throws down with reggaeton and, as evidenced by its single, is the first solid entry by a woman in the Latin trap movement."

== Commercial performance ==
Unstoppable debuted at number two on the US Top Latin Albums chart, earning 4,000 album-equivalent units (including 3,000 copies in pure album sales) in its first week, according to Nielsen Music. The album also debuted at number 192 on the US Billboard 200 and number two on the US Latin Rhythm Albums charts respectively. On November 8, 2018, the album was certified double platinum by the Latin Recording Industry Association of America (RIAA) for combined sales and album-equivalent units of over 120,000 units in the United States.

== Track listing ==
Credits were adapted from Tidal.

Unstoppable
No.	Title	Writer(s)	Producer(s)	Length
1.	"Ganas de Ti"	Carolina Giraldo; Daniel Echavarría Oviedo	Ovy on the Drums	3:47
2.	"La Dama" (with Cosculluela)	Giraldo; José Suárez; Oviedo	Ovy on the Drums; Montana The Producer; Mueka	3:28
3.	"Hello" (with Ozuna)	Giraldo; Juan Rosado; Oviedo	Ovy on the Drums; Mosty	3:45
4.	"El Pecado"	Giraldo; Oviedo	Ovy on the Drums	4:11
5.	"A Solas"	Giraldo; Oviedo	Ovy on the Drums	3:50
6.	"Ahora Me Llama" (with Bad Bunny)	Giraldo; Benito Martinez; Oviedo	Ovy on the Drums; DJ Luian	3:55
7.	"Eres Mi Todo" (with Kevin Roldán)	Giraldo; Ronny Velasco; Toby Letra; Fredy Marín; Kevin Roldán	Ovy on the Drums	4:07
8.	"Amor No Hay"	Giraldo; Oviedo	Ovy on the Drums	3:52
9.	"A Ella"	Giraldo; Andrés Torres; Mauricio Rengifo	Andrés Torres; Mauricio Rengifo	3:48
10.	"Muñeco de Lego"	Giraldo; Oviedo	Ovy on the Drums; Mosty	3:44
11.	"Casi Nada"	Giraldo; Andy Clay; Hector Ruben Rivera; Gustavo Alberto; GabrielRodriguezEMC; Oviedo	Ovy on the Drums	3:38
12.	"Lo Sabe Dios"	Giraldo; Fernando Tobon; Oviedo	Ovy on the Drums	4:27
13.	"Ahora Me Llama (Remix)" (with Bad Bunny and Quavo)	Giraldo; Martinez; Quavious Marshall; Oviedo	Ovy on the Drums	4:11
Total length:				51:43

== Personnel ==
Credits were adapted from Tidal.

Performers

- Karol G – primary artist
- Cosculluela – featured artist (track 2)
- Ozuna – featured artist (track 3)
- Bad Bunny – featured artist (tracks 6, 13)
- Kevin Roldán – featured artist (track 7)
- Quavo – featured artist (track 13)

Technical

- Mosty – mixing engineer (all tracks)
- Jaycen Joshua – mixing engineer (all tracks)

Production

- Ovy On The Drums – producer (tracks 1–8, 10–13)
- Andrés Torres – producer (track 9)
- Mauricio Rengifo – producer (track 9)

== Charts ==
=== Weekly charts ===
Chart (2017)	Peak position
Spanish Albums (PROMUSICAE)	79
US Billboard 200	192
US Top Latin Albums (Billboard)	2
US Latin Rhythm Albums (Billboard)	2

=== Year-end charts ===
Chart (2018)	Position
US Top Latin Albums (Billboard)	22
Chart (2019)	Position
US Top Latin Albums (Billboard)	59

== Certifications ==
Region	Certification	Certified units/sales
Costa Rica	2× Platinum	
Mexico (AMPROFON)	3× Platinum+Gold	210,000^{‡}
United States (RIAA)	2× Platinum (Latin)	120,000^{‡}
^{‡} Sales+streaming figures based on certification alone.
