= Mi Cama =

2018 single by Karol G

Single by Karol G

from the album Ocean
- Language: Spanish
- English title: "My Bed"
- Released: May 11, 2018
- Genre: Reggaeton
- Length: 2:30
- Label: Universal Music Latino
- Songwriters: Carolina Giraldo; Andy Clay; Antonio Rayo Gibo; Omar Sabino; Rene Cano
- Producers: Andy Clay; Antonio Rayo Gibo

Karol G singles chronology
"Princesa" (2018)	"Mi Cama" (2018)	"Calypso (Remix)" (2018)

"Mi Cama" (transl. "My Bed") is a song by Colombian singer-songwriter Karol G. It was written by Giraldo, Andy Clay, Antonio Rayo, Omar Sabino and Rene Cano, and produced by Clay and Rayo. The song was released on May 11, 2018, through Universal Music Latino, as the second single from her second studio album Ocean.

== Background ==
The song was first teased days prior to its official release through Karol G’s social media accounts, including snippets of the song and lyrics in captions. On May 9, 2018 the song had its official announcement, and the cover was released the following day. The song was released on May 11, 2018. A remix with Colombian singer J Balvin and featuring American singer Nicky Jam was released on July 13, 2018.

== Critical reception ==
Billboard stated: "The song became one of the biggest hits of the summer thanks to its catchy, sheets-shaking melody. Unapologetically sexy and insistent about women reigning in bed."

== Commercial performance ==
"Mi Cama" debuted at number 45 on the US Billboard Hot Latin Songs chart dated June 2, 2018. In its fifth and sixth weeks, the song maintained a new peak of number 17. Following the release "Mi Cama (Remix)" with J Balvin and featuring Nicky Jam, the song reached a new peak on its seventh week chart dated July 21, 2018. On its twelfth week, "Mi Cama" reaches its final peak of number 6 for two consecutive weeks on the chart dated August 25, 2018, becoming Karol G’s highest peaking song on the chart at that time. The song received a Latin diamond certification by the Recording Industry Association of America (RIAA) on April 15, 2019, for sales of 600,000 equivalent-units.

== Awards and nominations ==
Awards and nominations for "Mi Cama"
Year	Ceremony	Category	Result
2018	Latin Grammy Awards	Best Urban Performance	Nominated
2018	Latino Music Awards	Best Video	Nominated
2019	ASCAP Award	Winning Song	Won
2019	Premios Lo Nuestro	Video of the Year	Won
2019	Premios Tu Música Urbano	International Artist Song	Nominated
2019	Premios Tu Música Urbano	International Artist Video	Nominated

== Music video ==
The music video for "Mi Cama" was directed by JP Valencia and was released on Karol G’s YouTube channel on May 11, 2018.

The music video for its remix with J Balvin and featuring Nicky Jam was directed by Mike Ho and was released on August 9, 2018.

== Charts ==
=== Weekly charts ===
Weekly chart performance for "Mi Cama"
Chart (2018)	Peak position
Argentina Hot 100 (Billboard)	18
Spain (PROMUSICAE)	5
US Bubbling Under Hot 100 (Billboard)	5
US Hot Latin Songs (Billboard)	6
US Latin Airplay (Billboard)	1
US Latin Rhythm Airplay (Billboard)	1

=== Year-end charts ===
Year-end chart performance for "Mi Cama"
Chart (2018)	Position
US Hot Latin Songs (Billboard)	29

== Certifications ==
Certifications for "Mi Cama"
Region	Certification	Certified units/sales
Brazil (Pro-Música Brasil)	Platinum	40,000^{‡}
Canada (Music Canada) Remix version	Gold	40,000^{‡}
Mexico (AMPROFON)	Platinum	60,000^{‡}
Spain (Promusicae)	3× Platinum	180,000^{‡}
United States (RIAA)	Diamond (Latin)	600,000^{‡}
^{‡} Sales+streaming figures based on certification alone.
