= Pineapple (Karol G song) =

2018 single by Karol G

Single by Karol G

from the album Ocean
- Language: Spanish
- Released: March 1, 2018
- Genre: Reggaeton
- Length: 2:58
- Label: Universal Music Latino
- Songwriters: Carolina Giraldo; Mauricio Alberto Reglero; Ricardo Andrés Reglero; Sky Rompiendo
- Producer: Sky Rompiendo

Karol G singles chronology
"Mi Mala (Remix)" (2018)	"Pineapple" (2018)	"Tu Pum Pum" (2018)

Music video
- "Pineapple" on YouTube

"Pineapple" is a song by Colombian singer-songwriter Karol G. Written alongside Mauricio Reglero, Ricardo Reglero and Sky Rompiendo, and produced by the latter, the song was released on March 1, 2018, through Universal Music Latino, as lead single from her second studio album Ocean.

== Background ==
The song was first teased a month prior to its official release through Karol G’s social media accounts, with multiple snippets of the song and lyrics used in captions. The song was officially announced on February 25, 2018, with its release date and cover art revealed. The song was released on March 1, 2018.

== Critical reception ==
Suzette Fernandez from Billboard referred to the song as "that seductive/urban line that characterizes Karol G."

== Commercial performance ==
"Pineapple" debuted and peaked at number 49 on the US Billboard Hot Latin Songs chart dated March 17, 2018.

== Awards and nominations ==
Awards and nominations for "Pineapple"
Year	Ceremony	Category	Result
2019	Heat Latin Music Awards	Best Video	Won

== Music video ==
The music video for "Pineapple" was directed by Harold from 36 Grados and was released on Karol G’s YouTube channel on March 1, 2018.

== Charts ==
Weekly chart performance for "Pineapple"
Chart (2018)	Peak position
Spain (PROMUSICAE)	59
US Hot Latin Songs (Billboard)	49

== Certifications ==
Certifications for "Pineapple"
Region	Certification	Certified units/sales
Spain (Promusicae)	Platinum	60,000^{‡}
United States (RIAA)	3× Platinum (Latin)	180,000^{‡}
^{‡} Sales+streaming figures based on certification alone.
