= Ahora Me Llama =

2017 single by Karol G

Single by Karol G and Bad Bunny

from the album Unstoppable
- Language: Spanish
- English title: "Now He Calls Me"
- Released: May 26, 2017
- Genre: Latin trap
- Length: 3:55
- Label: Universal Music Latino
- Songwriters: Carolina Giraldo; Daniel Echavarria; Benito Martinez
- Producers: Chris Jedi; Gaby Music; Ovy on the Drums

Karol G singles chronology
| "A Ella" (2017) | "Ahora Me Llama" (2017) | "Eres Mi Todo" (2017) |

Bad Bunny singles chronology
| "Blockia" (2017) | "Ahora Me Llama" (2017) | "Give It Up" (2017) |

Music video
- "Ahora Me Llama" on YouTube

"Ahora Me Llama" (transl. "Now He Calls Me") is a song by Colombian singer Karol G and Puerto Rican singer and rapper Bad Bunny. Written alongside Ovy on the Drums, and produced by the latter, Chris Jedi and Gaby Music, the song was released on May 26, 2017, through Universal Music Latino, as the fifth single from Karol G's debut studio album, Unstoppable.

== Background ==
The song was announced on May 23, 2017, through Karol G's social media accounts, and was released on May 26, 2017.

== Commercial performance ==
"Ahora Me Llama" debuted at #46 on the US Billboard Hot Latin Songs chart dated for July 15, 2017. The song continued climbing up stops, reaching its peak in its 17th week at #10, for the chart dated November 4, 2017. At the time it became Giraldo's highest-charting song on the chart.

== Music video ==
The video of "Ahora Me Llama" was released on June 8, 2017, on Karol G's YouTube channel. As of December 2023, the music video for the song has over 1 billion views on YouTube.

== Charts ==
=== Weekly charts ===
| Chart (2017) | Peak position |
|---|---|
| Spain (PROMUSICAE) | 22 |
| US Hot Latin Songs (Billboard) | 10 |
| US Latin Rhythm Airplay (Billboard) | 20 |

=== Year-end charts ===
| Chart (2017) | Position |
|---|---|
| Spain (PROMUSICAE) | 76 |
| US Hot Latin Songs (Billboard) | 35 |

== Certifications ==
| Region | Certification | Certified units/sales |
|---|---|---|
| Spain (Promusicae) | 2× Platinum | 120,000^{‡} |
| United States (RIAA) | Diamond (Latin) | 600,000^{‡} |
^{‡} Sales+streaming figures based on certification alone.
