= Punto G (Karol G song) =

2019 single by Karol G

Single by Karol G

from the album Ocean
- Language: Spanish
- English title: "G Spot"
- Released: April 4, 2019
- Genre: Reggaeton
- Length: 3:01
- Label: Universal Latino
- Songwriters: Carolina Giraldo; Andy Clay; Antonio Rayo
- Producers: Andy Clay; Rayito

Karol G singles chronology
"Hijoepu*#" (2019)	"Punto G" (2019)	"Ocean" (2019)

Music video
- "Punto G" on YouTube

"Punto G" is a song by Colombian singer-songwriter Karol G. It was written by Giraldo, Andy Clay and Rayito, and produced by the latter two. The song was released on 4 April 2019, through Universal Music Latino, as the fourth single from her second studio album Ocean.

== Background ==
The song was first teased a month prior to its official release through Karol G's social media accounts, with snippets of the song, video and lyrics used in her captions. The song was officially announced a day prior to its release.

== Critical reception ==
Rolling Stone stated: "Few reggaeton songs have championed the vagina as intimately as Karol G does in "Punto G" — opting to skip the graphic details, Karol masters the delicate art of sensual suggestion."

== Commercial performance ==
"Punto G" debuted at number 40 on the US Billboard Hot Latin Songs chart dated 20 April 2019, charting for one week. On its fifth week, the song entered and peaked at number 30 on the chart dated 18 May 2019.

== Awards and nominations ==
Awards and nominations for "Punto G"
Year	Ceremony	Category	Result
2019	Premios Juventud	Sick Dance Routine (Best Choreography)	Nominated

== Music video ==
The music video for "Punto G" was directed by José-Emilio Sagaró and was released on Giraldo's YouTube channel on the same day.

== Charts ==
Weekly chart performance for "Punto G"
Chart (2019)	Peak position
Argentina Hot 100 (Billboard)	73
Spain (PROMUSICAE)	33
US Hot Latin Songs (Billboard)	30
US Latin Airplay (Billboard)	33
US Latin Rhythm Airplay (Billboard)	27

== Certifications ==
Certifications for "Punto G"
Region	Certification	Certified units/sales
Mexico (AMPROFON)	Platinum	60,000^{‡}
Spain (Promusicae)	Platinum	60,000^{‡}
^{‡} Sales+streaming figures based on certification alone.
