= List of Billboard number-one tropical songs of 2026 =

The Billboard Hot Tropical Songs and Tropical Airplay chart ranks the best-performing tropical songs played on Latin radio stations in the United States.

== Chart history ==
Chart history
Issue date	Hot Tropical Songs			Tropical Airplay		
Issue date	Title	Artist	Ref.	Title	Artist(s)	Ref.
January 3	"Baile Inolvidable"	Bad Bunny		"Lokita Por Mí"	Romeo Santos and Prince Royce	
January 10	"Baile Inolvidable"	Bad Bunny		"Lokita Por Mí"	Romeo Santos and Prince Royce	
January 17	"Baile Inolvidable"	Bad Bunny		"Lokita Por Mí"	Romeo Santos and Prince Royce	
January 24	"Baile Inolvidable"	Bad Bunny		"Lokita Por Mí"	Romeo Santos and Prince Royce	
January 31	"Baile Inolvidable"	Bad Bunny		"Lokita Por Mí"	Romeo Santos and Prince Royce	
February 7	"Baile Inolvidable"	Bad Bunny		"Lokita Por Mí"	Romeo Santos and Prince Royce	
February 14	"Baile Inolvidable"	Bad Bunny		"Lokita Por Mí"	Romeo Santos and Prince Royce	
February 21	"Baile Inolvidable"	Bad Bunny		"Lokita Por Mí"	Romeo Santos and Prince Royce	
February 28	"Baile Inolvidable"	Bad Bunny		"Lokita Por Mí"	Romeo Santos and Prince Royce	
March 7	"Baile Inolvidable"	Bad Bunny		"Lokita Por Mí"	Romeo Santos and Prince Royce	
March 14	"Baile Inolvidable"	Bad Bunny		"Lokita Por Mí"	Romeo Santos and Prince Royce	
March 21	"Baile Inolvidable"	Bad Bunny		"Lokita Por Mí"	Romeo Santos and Prince Royce	
March 28	"Baile Inolvidable"	Bad Bunny		"Lokita Por Mí"	Romeo Santos and Prince Royce	
April 4	"Baile Inolvidable"	Bad Bunny		"Como En El Idilio"	Marc Anthony and Nathy Peluso	
April 11	"Baile Inolvidable"	Bad Bunny		"Como En El Idilio"	Marc Anthony and Nathy Peluso	
April 18	"Baile Inolvidable"	Bad Bunny		"Como En El Idilio"	Marc Anthony and Nathy Peluso	
April 25	"Baile Inolvidable"	Bad Bunny		"Cambiaré"	Luis Fonsi and Feid	
May 2	"Baile Inolvidable"	Bad Bunny		"1+1"	Maluma and Kany Garcia	
May 9	"Baile Inolvidable"	Bad Bunny		"Dardos"	Romeo Santos and Prince Royce	
May 16	"Baile Inolvidable"	Bad Bunny		"Dardos"	Romeo Santos and Prince Royce	
May 23	"Baile Inolvidable"	Bad Bunny		"Te Dedico"	Carlos Vives	
May 30	"Baile Inolvidable"	Bad Bunny		"Te Dedico"	Carlos Vives	
June 6	"Baile Inolvidable"	Bad Bunny		"Te Dedico"	Carlos Vives	
June 13	"Baile Inolvidable"	Bad Bunny		"Hoy Se Guaya"	Arcángel	
June 20	"Baile Inolvidable"	Bad Bunny		"Dardos"	Romeo Santos and Prince Royce	
June 27	"Baile Inolvidable"	Bad Bunny		"Dardos"	Romeo Santos and Prince Royce	
July 4	"Baile Inolvidable"	Bad Bunny		"Dardos"	Romeo Santos and Prince Royce	
July 11	"Baile Inolvidable"	Bad Bunny		"Dardos"	Romeo Santos and Prince Royce	
July 18	"Baile Inolvidable"	Bad Bunny		"Dardos"	Romeo Santos and Prince Royce	
July 25	"Baile Inolvidable"	Bad Bunny		"Tu Recuerdo"	Maluma	
August 1	"Baile Inolvidable"	Bad Bunny		"Dardos"	Romeo Santos and Prince Royce	
August 8	"Baile Inolvidable"	Bad Bunny		"Dardos"	Romeo Santos and Prince Royce	
August 15	"Baile Inolvidable"	Bad Bunny		"Ay! San Miguel"	Romeo Santos and Prince Royce	
August 22	"Baile Inolvidable"	Bad Bunny		"Ay! San Miguel"	Romeo Santos and Prince Royce	
August 29	"Baile Inolvidable"	Bad Bunny		"Ay! San Miguel"	Romeo Santos and Prince Royce	
September 5	"Baile Inolvidable"	Bad Bunny		"Ay! San Miguel"	Romeo Santos and Prince Royce	
September 12	"Baile Inolvidable"	Bad Bunny		"Ay! San Miguel"	Romeo Santos and Prince Royce	
September 19	"Baile Inolvidable"	Bad Bunny		"Ay! San Miguel"	Romeo Santos and Prince Royce	
September 26	"Baile Inolvidable"	Bad Bunny		"Ay! San Miguel"	Romeo Santos and Prince Royce	
October 3	"Baile Inolvidable"	Bad Bunny		"Ay! San Miguel"	Romeo Santos and Prince Royce	
October 10	"Baile Inolvidable"	Bad Bunny		"Ay! San Miguel"	Romeo Santos and Prince Royce	
October 17	"Baile Inolvidable"	Bad Bunny		"Ay! San Miguel"	Romeo Santos and Prince Royce	
October 24	"Baile Inolvidable"	Bad Bunny		"Ay! San Miguel"	Romeo Santos and Prince Royce	
October 31	"Baile Inolvidable"	Bad Bunny		"Ay! San Miguel"	Romeo Santos and Prince Royce	
November 7	"Baile Inolvidable"	Bad Bunny		"Aqua"	Shakira and Maluma	
November 14	"Baile Inolvidable"	Bad Bunny		"Aqua"	Shakira and Maluma	
November 21	"Baile Inolvidable"	Bad Bunny		"Aqua"	Shakira and Maluma	
