= List of Billboard number-one Latin rhythm songs of 2025 =

Hot Latin Rhythm Songs and Latin Rhythm Airplay are charts that rank the top-performing Latin rhythm songs in the United States, published by Billboard magazine.

== Chart history ==
Chart history
Issue date	Hot Latin Rhythm Songs			Latin Rhythm Airplay		
Issue date	Title	Artist	Ref.	Title	Artist(s)	Ref.
January 4	—N/a			"Ohnana"	Kapo	
January 11	—N/a			"Ohnana"	Kapo	
January 18	—N/a			"Ohnana"	Kapo	
January 25	—N/a			"Qué Pasaría..."	Rauw Alejandro and Bad Bunny	
February 1	—N/a			"El Clúb"	Bad Bunny	
February 8	—N/a			"El Clúb"	Bad Bunny	
February 15	—N/a			"El Clúb"	Bad Bunny	
February 22	—N/a			"Otra Noche "	Myke Towers featuring Darell	
March 1	—N/a			"Otra Noche "	Myke Towers featuring Darell	
March 8	—N/a			"Khé?"	Rauw Alejandro and Romeo Santos	
March 15	—N/a			"Doblexxo"	J Balvin and Feid	
March 22	—N/a			"Khé?"	Rauw Alejandro and Romeo Santos	
March 29	—N/a			"Khé?"	Rauw Alejandro and Romeo Santos	
April 5	—N/a			"Imagínate"	Danny Ocean and Kapo	
April 12	"DTMF"	Bad Bunny		"Hablame Claro"	Yandel and Feid	
April 19	"DTMF"	Bad Bunny		"Más Que Tú"	Ozuna and Kapo	
April 26	"DTMF"	Bad Bunny		"Imagínate"	Danny Ocean and Kapo	
May 3	"DTMF"	Bad Bunny		"Degenere"	Myke Towers featuring Benny Blanco	
May 10	"DTMF"	Bad Bunny		"Degenere"	Myke Towers featuring Benny Blanco	
May 17	"DTMF"	Bad Bunny		"DTMF"	Bad Bunny	
May 24	"DTMF"	Bad Bunny		"DTMF"	Bad Bunny	
May 31	"DTMF"	Bad Bunny		"DTMF"	Bad Bunny	
June 7	"DTMF"	Bad Bunny		"DTMF"	Bad Bunny	
June 14	"DTMF"	Bad Bunny		"DTMF"	Bad Bunny	
June 21	"DTMF"	Bad Bunny		"DTMF"	Bad Bunny	
June 28	"DTMF"	Bad Bunny		"DTMF"	Bad Bunny	
July 5	"DTMF"	Bad Bunny		"Latina Foreva"	Karol G	
July 12	"DTMF"	Bad Bunny		"Rio"	J Balvin	
July 19	"DTMF"	Bad Bunny		"Latina Foreva"	Karol G	
July 26	"DTMF"	Bad Bunny		"Latina Foreva"	Karol G	
August 2	"DTMF"	Bad Bunny		"Soleao"	Myke Towers and Quevedo	
August 9	"DTMF"	Bad Bunny		"Soleao"	Myke Towers and Quevedo	
August 16	"DTMF"	Bad Bunny		"Eoo"	Bad Bunny	
August 23	"DTMF"	Bad Bunny		"Eoo"	Bad Bunny	
August 30	"DTMF"	Bad Bunny		"Latina Foreva"	Karol G	
September 6	"DTMF"	Bad Bunny		"Luna"	Kapo and Wisin	
September 13	"DTMF"	Bad Bunny		"Hiekka"	Nicky Jam and Beéle	
September 20	"DTMF"	Bad Bunny		"Sirenita"	Ozuna	
September 27	"DTMF"	Bad Bunny		"Sirenita"	Ozuna	
October 4	"DTMF"	Bad Bunny		"Bronceador"	Maluma	
October 11	"DTMF"	Bad Bunny		"Sirenita"	Ozuna	
October 18	"DTMF"	Bad Bunny		"Noventa"	DJ Snake and J. Balvin	
October 25	"DTMF"	Bad Bunny		"Sonríele"	DY	
November 1	"DTMF"	Bad Bunny		"Nuevayol"	Bad Bunny	
November 8	"DTMF"	Bad Bunny		"Pórtate Bonito"	Anuel AA and Blessd	
November 15	"DTMF"	Bad Bunny		"Tengo Celos"	Myke Towers	
November 22	"DTMF"	Bad Bunny		"Tengo Celos"	Myke Towers	
November 29	"DTMF"	Bad Bunny		"Verano Rosa"	Karol G and Feid	
December 6	"DTMF"	Bad Bunny		"Se Lo Juro Mor"	Feid	
December 13	"DTMF"	Bad Bunny		"Se Lo Juro Mor"	Feid	
December 20	"DTMF"	Bad Bunny		"Se Lo Juro Mor"	Feid	
December 27	"DTMF"	Bad Bunny		"Perfumito Nuevo"	Bad Bunny	
