= List of number-one songs of 2025 (Panama) =

This is a list of the number-one songs of 2025 in Panama. The charts are published by Monitor Latino, based on airplay across radio stations in Panama using the Radio Tracking Data, LLC in real time, with its chart week running from Monday to Sunday.

In 2025 so far, fifteen songs reached number one in Panama, with eleven of them being collaborations; a fourteenth single, "Soltera" by Shakira, began its run at number one in October 2024. In fact, twenty-six acts topped the chart as either lead or featured artists with ten —Romeo Santos, Morat, Nicki Nicole, Feid, Jay Wheeler, Fariana, Kiko El Crazy, Alleh, Yorghaki, Fresh Bodden, Kybba and Lion Fiah— achieving their first number-one single in Panama.

Karol G and Morat are the only acts to have more than a number-one song in 2025, with three apiece. With "Nuevayol" replacing "DTMF" at number one, Bad Bunny became the fourth artist in Panama to replace himself at the top spot, and only the third artist in the country to have two songs in the top-two. That same year, Karol G achieved that feat for a second time, two times in a row as "Coleccionando Heridas" (with Marco Antonio Solís, which eventually earned his second number-one single in Panama, and his first in 16 years since "No Molestar" in 2009) replaced "Verano Rosa" with Feid for a week, with the latter song eventually replacing the former in the following week.

== Chart history ==
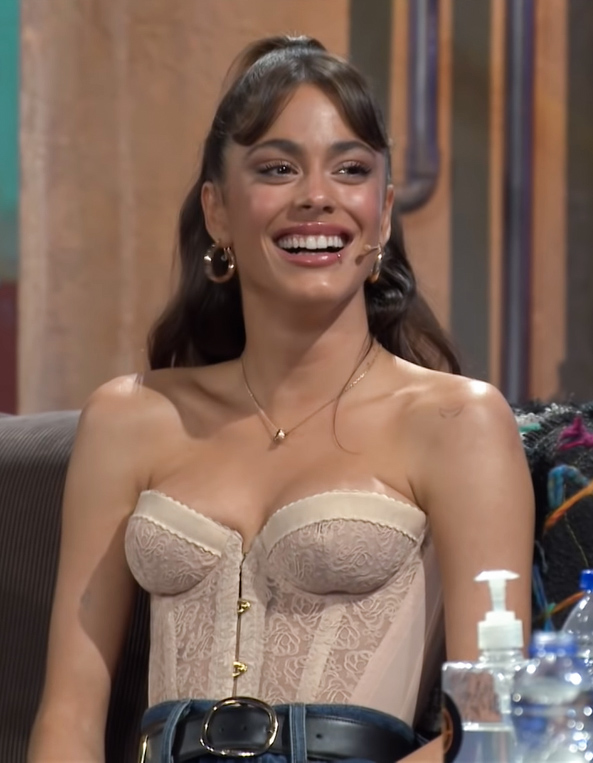
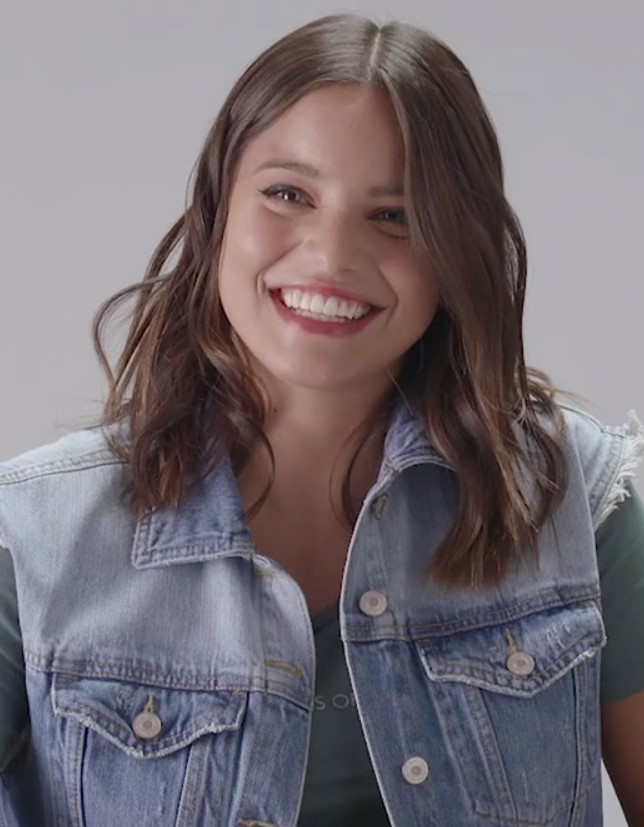
With "Blackout" debuting at number one, Tini (left) and Emilia (right) became the first female artists to debut two songs at the top spot in Panama, with their first being "La Original" in 2023.

Key
†	Indicates best-performing single of 2025

Issue date	Song	Artist	Reference
6 January	"Soltera" †	Shakira	
13 January	"Soltera" †	Shakira	
20 January	"Soltera" †	Shakira	
27 January	"Soltera" †	Shakira	
3 February	"Soltera" †	Shakira	
10 February	"Soltera" †	Shakira	
17 February	"DTMF"	Bad Bunny	
24 February	"Nuevayol"	Bad Bunny	
3 March	"Soltera" †	Shakira	
10 March	"Soltera" †	Shakira	
17 March	"Capaz (Merenguetón)"	Alleh and Yorghaki	
24 March	"Soltera" †	Shakira	
31 March	"Me toca a mí"	Morat and Camilo	
7 April	"Me toca a mí"	Morat and Camilo	
14 April	"Me toca a mí"	Morat and Camilo	
21 April	"Me toca a mí"	Morat and Camilo	
28 April	"Me toca a mí"	Morat and Camilo	
5 May	"Me toca a mí"	Morat and Camilo	
12 May	"Blackout"	Emilia, Nicki Nicole and Tini	
19 May	"Blackout"	Emilia, Nicki Nicole and Tini	
26 May	"Blackout"	Emilia, Nicki Nicole and Tini	
2 June	"Blackout"	Emilia, Nicki Nicole and Tini	
9 June	"Blackout"	Emilia, Nicki Nicole and Tini	
16 June	"Vuelvo a ti"	Morat	
23 June	"Latina Foreva"	Karol G	
30 June	"Latina Foreva"	Karol G	
7 July	"Latina Foreva"	Karol G	
14 July	"Latina Foreva"	Karol G	
21 July	"Me Muevo"	Fariana and Kiko El Crazy	
28 July	"Me Muevo"	Fariana and Kiko El Crazy	
4 August	"Verano Rosa"	Karol G and Feid	
11 August	"Verano Rosa"	Karol G and Feid	
18 August	"Verano Rosa"	Karol G and Feid	
25 August	"Coleccionando Heridas"	Karol G and Marco Antonio Solís	
1 September	"Verano Rosa"	Karol G and Feid	
8 September	"Sin Ti"	Morat and Jay Wheeler	
15 September	"Tengo Celos"	Myke Towers	
22 September	"Sin Ti"	Morat and Jay Wheeler	
29 September	"Paris"	Boza and Sech	
6 October	"Que Me Quiera Má"	Marc Anthony and Wisin	
13 October	"Que Me Quiera Má"	Marc Anthony and Wisin	
20 October	"Que Me Quiera Má"	Marc Anthony and Wisin	
27 October	"Que Me Quiera Má"	Marc Anthony and Wisin	
3 November	"Que Me Quiera Má"	Marc Anthony and Wisin	
10 November	"Sonríele"	Daddy Yankee	
17 November	"Sonríele"	Daddy Yankee	
24 November	"Las XII"	Fresh Bodden, Kybba and Lion Fiah	
1 December	"Las XII"	Fresh Bodden, Kybba and Lion Fiah	
8 December	"Sonríele"	Daddy Yankee	
15 December	"Lokita Por Mí"	Romeo Santos and Prince Royce	
22 December	"Lokita Por Mí"	Romeo Santos and Prince Royce	
29 December	"Lokita Por Mí"	Romeo Santos and Prince Royce	
