= Tropicoqueta =

Studio album by Karol G
- Released: June 20, 2025
- Recorded: 2023 – December 2024
- Genres: Latin pop; cumbia; reggaeton; vallenato; salsa
- Length: 57:58
- Languages: Spanish; English; Portuguese
- Labels: Bichota; Interscope
- Producers: Karol G; Édgar Barrera; Pharrell Williams; Ovy on the Drums; Mazzarri; Misha; Joel Iglesias; Sky Rompiendo; Axel Caram; Tropkillaz; Taiko; Tainy

Karol G chronology
Mañana Será Bonito (Bichota Season) (2023)	Tropicoqueta (2025)	No Me Arrepiento de Sentir Tanto (2026)

Singles from Tropicoqueta
- 1. "Si Antes Te Hubiera Conocido" Released: June 20, 2024; 2. "Latina Foreva" Released: May 22, 2025; 3. "Papasito" Released: June 20, 2025; 4. "Ivonny Bonita" Released: December 8, 2025; 5. "Viajando Por el Mundo" Released: May 25, 2026

Tropicoqueta is the fifth studio album by Colombian singer Karol G. It was released on June 20, 2025, through Bichota Records and Interscope. Comprising twenty tracks, the album features guest appearances by Eddy Lover, Marco Antonio Solís, Greeicy, Feid, Mariah Angeliq, and Manu Chao.

Tropicoqueta was supported by five singles: "Si Antes Te Hubiera Conocido", "Latina Foreva", "Papasito", "Ivonny Bonita" and "Viajando Por El Mundo" with Manu Chao. Upon its release, the album was a commercial success and became the fourth all-Spanish language album by a woman to reach the top three on the US Billboard 200, earning 57,000 album-equivalent units in its first week.

The recipient of several accolades, Tropicoqueta received a Grammy nomination for Best Pop Album at the 68th Annual Grammy Awards and won for Best Urban Music Album at the 27th Annual Latin Grammy Awards. The single "Si Antes Te Hubiera Conocido" also garnered three nominations at the 26th Annual Latin Grammy Awards, winning two, including the Latin Grammy Award for Song of the Year.

== Background ==
Following the release of her fourth studio album in 2023, Mañana Será Bonito and its mixtape companion piece, Mañana Será Bonito (Bichota Season), Karol G embarked on the Mañana Será Bonito Tour, which began on August 10, 2023, through July 23, 2024.

While touring, Giraldo released collaborative songs with other artists and stand alone singles, such as Kali Uchis' "Labios Mordidos", Andrea Bocelli's cover of "Vivo Por Ella, Sevdaliza's "No Me Cansare" and her own "Que Chimba de Vida" and "Contigo" with Tiësto.

On June 18, 2024, she announced the release of "Si Antes Te Hubiera Conocido" through her social media accounts. It was released on June 20, 2024, as the album's lead single. On November 7, 2024, "+57" in collaboration with Colombian artists Feid, DFZM, Ovy on the Drums, J Balvin, Maluma, Ryan Castro and Blessd was released as a standalone single. "Latina Foreva" was announced on May 21, 2025, and was released the following day on May 22, 2025.

On June 9, 2025, Karol G announced the title for the album and the following day on June 10, 2025, she announced its release date and cover art. Days before its release, the track list started being revealed through billboards in different cities. Tropicoqueta was released on June 20, 2025.

== Concept ==
When revealing its cover art and release date, Karol G described the album as "Everything that represents me". She stated:

Traveling around the world with my past album, an album that gave me so much, I kept asking myself the same question: What's is the next step? What's next for me? I think it wasn't about looking further, but about looking deeper... deeper into me, who I really am, the things I like, everything that represents me. Going back to my roots, to the songs I grew up listening with, to the sounds that made me fall in love with music. Staying in the place where I really feel great because it represents not only who I am, but those people who have given me the opportunity to be where I am today.

— Karol G explaining what the album represents.

On an interview with Rolling Stone, Giraldo depicted the album as "the album of my dreams". The idea for the album started on the United States leg for her Mañana Será Bonito Tour: "The process was terrible because I wasn't ready to think about what came next after an album and tour as massive as that one. I felt a lot of pressure. I started thinking maybe I should do an album in English or I should experiment with new sounds I've never tried before."

According to Karol G, the album is meant to resonate with Latinos who grew up exposed to a variety of musical influences, on the same interview she followed up: "At first I couldn't figure out who we were targeting with the album. But I feel like it's for all Latinos who grew up like me, who grew up listening to everything that we are, not just one specific genre. At the end of the day, if there's people who don't like all the genres, they're at least going to find one genre they can connect with."

=== Title ===
The word "Tropicoqueta" is a mix of the Spanish words "tropical" and "coqueta", the latter meaning "flirty" or "playful".

Giraldo stated that she wanted the album to be "super Latin", and intended in naming it as the album's second single, but ultimately went with Tropicoqueta. She stated: "At first, I thought of naming the album "Latina Foreva" but that didn't feel right for a project full of love, heartbreak, partying, and dancing."

== Release and promotion ==
Tropicoqueta was released on June 20, 2025, through Bichota Records and Interscope. It was released on CD, vinyl, digital download and streaming. That same day, Karol G covered the magazine Complex for an interview and photoshoot. "Si Antes Te Hubiera Conocido" was incorporated throughout the Mañana Será Bonito Tour set list on June 19, 2024, through July 23, 2025. On September 11, 2024, Giraldo performed the song at the 2024 MTV Video Music Awards. The song was present during Karol G's set list for her Rock in Rio show on September 20, 2024. "Si Antes Te Hubiera Conocido" was performed once again on Feid's Ferxxocalipsis World Tour and Bad Bunny's Debí Tirar Más Fotos World Tour, where she was invited as a guest. On June 16, 2025, the trailer for the album, inspired by Mexican Telenovelas was released, featuring Mexican actresses Anahí, Ninel Conde, Itatí Cantoral and Gabriela Spanic. Names from the album's track list started being revealed on billboards in different cities through Latin America before the complete track list was unveiled on June 18, 2025. On June 23, 2025, Karol G appeared in a one-hour special interview on El Show de Cristina, a talk show that originally aired from 1989 to 2010. On June 24, 2025, an interview with Zane Lowe on The Zane Lowe Show was released. During the interview, Giraldo performed a live performance for "No Puedo Vivir Sin Él". She performed "Papasito" on The Tonight Show Starring Jimmy Fallon on June 26, 2025. Giraldo appeared on the Spanish talk show La Revuelta on July 3, 2025, where she also performed "Papasito" and "Verano Rosa". Karol G covered Elle magazine for a photoshoot and interview on July 16, 2025. In collaboration with Spotify, Karol G performed multiple songs from the album for a small pop-up show on Paradise Club in New York City, including "Dile Luna", "Amiga Mía", "Se Puso Linda" and "Tropicoqueta" for the first time. A piano version for "Se Puso Linda" was released exclusively for YouTube on August 6, 2025. On September 5, 2025, Karol G headlined the half time show for the season opener for the NFL in São Paulo. Multiple songs from Tropicoqueta were performed, including for the first time "Bandida Entrenada" and "Un Gatito Me Llamó". On October 5, 2025, Karol G performed "Ivonny Bonita" and "Latina Foreva" at the Victoria's Secret Fashion Show. She covered Vogue Mexico magazine for a photoshoot and interview on October 20, 2025. Karol G performed "Coleccionando Heridas" with Marco Antonio Solís for the first time on November 13, 2025, during the 26th Annual Latin Grammy Awards. On December 7, 2025, Giraldo released La Premiere on national television, a compilation of music videos for the album, including behind the scenes content from the album's creation. It was released on YouTube on December 10, 2025. She performed at the 2026 Coachella Valley Music and Arts Festival on April 12 and 19, becoming the first Latin female artist to headline. Giraldo performed "Ivonny Bonita" at the 2026 American Music Awards on May 25, 2026. Karol G embarked on the Viajando Por El Mundo Tropitour, slated to last from July 24, 2026, through July 14, 2027.

=== Singles ===
"Si Antes Te Hubiera Conocido" was released on June 20, 2024, as the album's lead single. The song reached the top 40 of the US Billboard Hot 100 at number 32. The song also reached the top spot on the US Billboard Hot Latin Songs. It also spent 14 weeks at the top, being one of only 5 songs by women to achieve it. It was nominated for Record of the Year, Song of the Year and Best Tropical Song at the 26th Annual Latin Grammy Awards, winning the latter two.

"Latina Foreva" was released as the second single on May 22, 2025. It reached the top 70 of the US Billboard Hot 100 chart, at number 66. It also peaked at number 3 on the US Billboard Hot Latin Songs.

"Papasito" was released as a single alongside the album's release on June 20, 2025. On the US Billboard Hot 100 chart, it peaked at number 77. On the US Billboard Hot Latin Songs, it reached the top 5.

"Ivonny Bonita" was released on December 8, 2025, as the fourth single. It peaked at number 13 on the US Billboard Hot Latin Songs.

"Viajando Por El Mundo" was released on May 25, 2026, as the fifth single. It peaked inside the top 40 on the US Billboard Hot Latin Songs.

== Critical reception ==
Professional ratings
Review scores
Source	Rating
AllMusic	3.5/5 stars
Pitchfork	8.0/10
Rolling Stone	4/5 stars

Writing for Rolling Stone, Julyssa Lopez praised the album, stating: "What's accomplished here is carefree and breezy, interested in accessibility and relatability. These aren't heady forays into classics from the Latin American songbook; part of Karol's brand has been her upbeat approachability and commercial power. She loads up the album with familiar Easter eggs and surprise samples and memorable interpolations, all stretching out like a mosaic of past and present. Tatiana Lee Rodriguez of Pitchfork called it her "most expansive and researched" project to date, highlighting Giraldo's dedication "to the communities who lift her up".

== Commercial performance ==
During the first day of release on Spotify, Tropicoqueta opened with 18.1 million streams on the Spotify Global chart and 26.9 million overall, breaking at that time the record for the second debut for a Spanish-language album by a woman, previously held by her own Mañana Será Bonito (Bichota Season), and only behind her own Mañana Será Bonito.

=== United States ===
Tropicoqueta debuted at number three on the US Billboard 200 chart, earning 57,000 album-equivalent units in its opening week, of which 2,000 came from pure sales, becoming Giraldo's third top three album on the chart. Tropicoqueta's tracks collected a total of 74.64 million on-demand audio streams in its first week, representing the largest US streaming week ever for a Latin album by a woman. The album also debuted atop the US Top Latin Albums chart, becoming Giraldo's fourth number one album on the chart.

== Accolades ==
Awards and nominations for Tropicoqueta
Year	Ceremony	Category	Result	Ref.
2025	Billboard Latin Music Awards	Latin Rhythm Album of the Year	Nominated	
2025	Los 40 Music Awards	Best Urban Album	Nominated	
2026	American Music Awards	Favorite Album – Latin	Won	
2026	Grammy Awards	Best Latin Pop Album	Nominated	
2026	Premio Lo Nuestro	Album of the Year	Nominated	
2026	Premios Tu Música Urbano	Album of the Year - Female	Won	
2026	Latin Grammy Awards	Album of the Year	Pending	
2026	Latin Grammy Awards	Best Urban Music Album	Pending	

== Track listing ==
Tropicoqueta track listing
No.	Title	Writer(s)	Producer(s)	Length
1.	"La Reina Presente"	Carolina Giraldo; Ariadna Sodi	Karol G	0:54
2.	"Ivonny Bonita"	Giraldo; Andrés Correa; Édgar Barrera; Pharrell Williams	Karol G; Barrera; Williams	3:42
3.	"Papasito"	Giraldo; Daniel Gutiérrez; Daniel Uribe; Daniel Echavarría	Ovy on the Drums	2:47
4.	"Latina Foreva"	Giraldo; Daniela Aponte; Hector Mazzarri; Misha Pihlakka; Eliel Lind; Álvaro Arroyo; Victor Santiago; Ramón Ayala; Natalie Albino; Nicole Albino; Leonardo Vasquez; Rolphy Ramirez; Edwin Almonte	Mazzarri; Misha	2:39
5.	"Dile Luna" (with Eddy Lover)	Giraldo; Eduardo Mosquera; Correa; Barrera	Karol G; Barrera; Joel Iglesias; Sky Rompiendo	3:07
6.	"Cuando Me Muera Te Olvido"	Giraldo; Correa; Barrera; Julia Lewis; Alejandro Ramírez; Axel Caram; George Michael; Andrew Ridgeley	Sky Rompiendo; Axel Caram^{[a]}	2:34
7.	"Coleccionando Heridas" (with Marco Antonio Solís)	Giraldo; Kevyn Cruz; Barrera; Luis Gómez	Barrera; Casta	3:24
8.	"Un Gatito Me Llamó"	Giraldo; Andrea Mangiamarchi; Echavarría; Leonardo Yasmil	Ovy on the Drums; Leo RD	2:02
9.	"Amiga Mía" (with Greeicy)	Giraldo; Greeicy Rendón; Correa; Barrera	Barrera	3:44
10.	"Bandida Entrenada"	Giraldo; Vinicius de Lima; Zé Gonzales; Andre Laudz	Tropkillaz	2:15
11.	"Ese Hombre Es Malo"	Giraldo; Correa; Barrera	Karol G; Barrera	3:40
12.	"A Su Boca La Amo (Interlude)"	Giraldo; John Lennon; Paul McCartney	Karol G; Iglesias	1:16
13.	"Verano Rosa" (with Feid)	Giraldo; Salomón Villada; A. Ramírez; Nicolás Jaña	Sky Rompiendo; Taiko	3:30
14.	"No Puedo Vivir Sin Él"	Giraldo; Andrés Correa; Barrera; Ivan Calderon	Karol G; Calderon	3:38
15.	"Tu Perfume"	Giraldo; Cruz; Echavarría	Ovy on the Drums	3:03
16.	"FKN Movie" (with Mariah Angeliq)	Giraldo; Mariah Pérez; Correa; Barrera; A. Ramírez; Jaña	Sky Rompiendo; Taiko	2:59
17.	"Se Puso Linda"	Giraldo; Cruz; Echavarría	Karol G; Ovy on the Drums	2:26
18.	"Viajando Por El Mundo" (with Manu Chao)	Giraldo; Manu Chao; Correa; Barrera	Karol G; Barrera	4:28
19.	"Si Antes Te Hubiera Conocido"	Giraldo; Correa; Barrera; A. Ramírez	Karol G; Barrera; Sky Rompiendo	3:15
20.	"Tropicoqueta"	Giraldo; Correa; Barrera; Marco Masís	Karol G; Barrera; Tainy	2:35
Total length:				57:58

Notes

- ^{^[a]} signifies a co-producer

== Personnel ==
Credits adapted from Tidal.

=== Musicians ===
- Karol G – lead vocals (all tracks), drums (track 5)
- Edgar Barrera – guitar (2, 5, 7, 18), vocal arrangement (11); bass, keyboards, percussion (18); background vocals (20)
- Pharrell – bass, drums (2)
- Arturo Sandoval – piano, trumpet (2)
- Alexa Demie – additional vocals (4)
- Raoul Alejandre – additional vocals (4)
- Joel Iglesias – synthesizer (5), guitar (5), background vocals (20)
- Sky Rompiendo – synthesizer (5)
- Casta – bass, drums (7)
- Chayanne Duverge – bajo sexto (9)
- Dawrin David Paredes – bongos (9)
- Ángel David Paredes – güira (9)
- Esterlin de León – guitar (9)
- Martires de León – guitar, vocal arrangement (9)
- Manuel Cerda – vocal arrangement (11)
- Mario Romero – vocal arrangement (11)
- Alvin Anaya – accordion, congas, snare drum (14)
- Iván Calderón – bass, guitar (14)
- Alex Molina – guitar (14)
- Diego Juanias – keyboards (14)
- Leonardo Villareal – timpani (14)
- Mariah Angeliq – vocals (16)
- Rios – background vocals (20)

=== Technical ===
- Josh Gudwin – mixing (1, 2, 4–12, 15–18, 20)
- Rob Kinelski – mixing (3)
- Joel Iglesias – mixing (12), engineering (all tracks), co-mixing (2, 4–11, 14–18, 20)
- Diego Juanias – mixing, engineering (14)
- Luis Barrera Jr. – mixing (14, 19), mastering (19)
- Dave Kutch – mastering (1–18)
- Eli Heisler – mastering, additional mixing (3)
- Edgar Barrera – engineering (2, 5–7, 9, 14, 16, 20)
- José "Pepe" Melena – engineering (7)
- Alex Ramirez – engineering (11)
- Guillermo Rojas – engineering (11)
- Mario Romero – engineering (11)
- Felix Byrne – mixing assistance (1, 2, 4, 5–12, 15–18, 20)
- Paulo Uribe – mixing assistance (14)

== Charts ==
=== Weekly charts ===
Weekly chart performance for Tropicoqueta
Chart (2025)	Peak position
Belgian Albums (Ultratop Flanders)	65
Belgian Albums (Ultratop Wallonia)	45
Canadian Albums (Billboard)	23
Dutch Albums (Album Top 100)	30
French Albums (SNEP)	30
Italian Albums (FIMI)	42
Portuguese Albums (AFP)	9
Spanish Albums (Promusicae)	1
Swiss Albums (Schweizer Hitparade)	2
US Billboard 200	3
US Top Latin Albums (Billboard)	1
US Latin Rhythm Albums (Billboard)	1

=== Year-end charts ===
Year-end chart performance for Tropicoqueta
Chart (2025)	Position
French Albums (SNEP)	200
Spanish Albums (PROMUSICAE)	8
Swiss Albums (Schweizer Hitparade)	55
US Billboard 200	171

== Certifications ==
Certifications for Tropicoqueta
Region	Certification	Certified units/sales
Belgium (BRMA)	Gold	10,000^{‡}
Canada (Music Canada)	Gold	40,000^{‡}
Italy (FIMI)	Gold	25,000^{‡}
Spain (Promusicae)	2× Platinum	80,000^{‡}
Streaming
Central America (CFC)	Platinum	7,000,000^{†}
^{‡} Sales+streaming figures based on certification alone.^{†} Streaming-only figures based on certification alone.

== Release history ==
Release history and formats for Mañana Será Bonito
Date	Format(s)	Label
June 20, 2025	digital download; streaming	Bichota • Intercorpse
September 26, 2025	CD; Vinyl LP	Bichota • Intercorpse

== See also ==
- 2025 in Latin music
- List of number-one albums of 2025 (Spain)
- List of number-one Billboard Latin Albums from the 2020s
- List of number-one Billboard Latin Rhythm Albums of 2025
