= Qué Pasaría... =

Single by Rauw Alejandro and Bad Bunny

from the album Cosa Nuestra
- Language: Spanish
- English title: "What Would Happen.."
- Released: November 29, 2024
- Genre: Reggaeton
- Length: 3:11
- Label: Duars; Sony Latin
- Songwriters: Raúl Ocasio; Benito Martínez
- Producers: Mag; El Zorro; Coogan; Red Fingers

Rauw Alejandro singles chronology
"Dolida" (2024)	"Qué Pasaría..." (2024)	"Khé?" (2024)

Bad Bunny singles chronology
"Una Velita" (2024)	"Qué Pasaría..." (2024)	"El Clúb" (2024)

Lyric video
- "Qué Pasaría..." on YouTube

"Qué Pasaría..." (transl. "What Would Happen...") is a song by Puerto Rican singer Rauw Alejandro and Puerto Rican rapper Bad Bunny. It was released on November 15, 2024, via Sony Music Latin and Duars Entertainment, as part of Alejandro's album, Cosa Nuestra (2024). In addition, it is the second collaboration between both artists, after "Party" for Bad Bunny's album, Un Verano Sin Ti (2022). "Qué Pasaría..." was released as a single in Italy on November 29, 2024.

== Background and release ==
When Alejandro revealed the track listing for Cosa Nuestra, the song and collaboration were revealed as the album's third track.

== Lyric video ==
A lyric video was released simultaneously with several others on November 15, 2024, along with the release of Alejandro's album, Cosa Nuestra. It shows a room and a woman getting out of her bed to organize it perfectly and then go back to bed. As she makes up the bed, you can see that she appears to be dancing and moving to the music.

== Charts ==
=== Weekly charts ===
Weekly chart performance for "Qué Pasaría..."
Chart (2024–2026)	Peak position
Argentina Hot 100 (Billboard)	16
Bolivia (Billboard)	7
Canada Hot 100 (Billboard)	62
Central America (Monitor Latino)	6
Central America + Caribbean (FONOTICA)	5
Chile (Billboard)	6
Colombia (Billboard)	14
Costa Rica (FONOTICA)	2
Ecuador (Billboard)	5
El Salvador (ASAP EGC)	3
France (SNEP)	178
Global 200 (Billboard)	20
Greece International (IFPI)	13
Guatemala (Monitor Latino)	5
Honduras (Monitor Latino)	8
Ireland (IRMA)	86
Italy (FIMI)	94
Latin America (Monitor Latino)	3
Lithuania (AGATA)	87
Lithuania Airplay (TopHit)	112
Mexico (Billboard)	9
Panama (Monitor Latino)	10
Peru (Billboard)	6
Peru (Monitor Latino)	4
Portugal (AFP)	27
Puerto Rico (Monitor Latino)	8
Romania Airplay (TopHit)	44
Spain (Promusicae)	1
Switzerland (Schweizer Hitparade)	19
US Billboard Hot 100	34
US Hot Latin Songs (Billboard)	2
US Hot Latin Rhythm Songs (Billboard)	6
US Latin Airplay (Billboard)	3
US Latin Rhythm Airplay (Billboard)	1
Uruguay (Monitor Latino)	9

=== Monthly charts ===
Monthly chart performance for "Qué Pasaría..."
Chart (2025)	Peak position
Romania Airplay (TopHit)	49

=== Year-end charts ===
Year-end chart performance for "Qué Pasaría..."
Chart (2025)	Position
Argentina Airplay (Monitor Latino)	56
Bolivia Airplay (Monitor Latino)	37
Central America Airplay (Monitor Latino)	36
Global 200 (Billboard)	79
Romania Airplay (TopHit)	189
US Hot Latin Songs (Billboard)	8

== Certifications ==
Certifications for "Qué Pasaría..."
Region	Certification	Certified units/sales
France (SNEP)	Gold	100,000^{‡}
Italy (FIMI)	Gold	100,000^{‡}
Mexico (AMPROFON)	Diamond+2× Platinum+Gold	1,050,000^{‡}
Portugal (AFP)	Platinum	10,000^{‡}
Spain (Promusicae)	3× Platinum	300,000^{‡}
United States (RIAA)	Gold (Latin)	30,000^{‡}
Streaming
Central America (CFC)	Gold	3,500,000^{†}
^{‡} Sales+streaming figures based on certification alone.^{†} Streaming-only figures based on certification alone.

== See also ==
- List of Billboard number-one Latin rhythm songs of 2025
