= Menor (song) =

2025 song by Romeo Santos and Prince Royce

Single by Romeo Santos and Prince Royce with Dalvin La Melodía

from the album Better Late Than Never
- Released: 1 October 2026
- Genre: Latin pop; bachata; tropical
- Length: 3:22
- Label: Sony Music Latin
- Songwriters: Anthony Santos; Alexander Caba; Jeffrey Nortey; Inassiah Emilio Parker; Martires De León
- Producers: Romeo Santos; Martires De León

Romeo Santos and Prince Royce singles chronology
"Ay! San Miguel" (2026)	"Menor" (2026)

Dalvin La Melodía singles chronology
"Me Despido (Remix)" (2026)	"Menor" (2026)

Music video
- "Menor" on YouTube

"Menor" (lit. 'Minor') is a song recorded by American singers Romeo Santos and Prince Royce, with Dalvin La Melodía. It was written by Santos alongside four other songwriters, including Dominican musician, comperser, and producern Martires De León. Both Santos and León also were the producers of the song. It was released by Sony Music Latin on November 28, 2025, as the eighth track from their collaborative studio album, Better Late Than Never (2025). The music video for was officially released on October 1, 2026.

== Charts ==
Chart performance for "Menor"
Chart (2026)	Peak position
Dominican Republic Bachata (Monitor Latino)	14
US Hot Tropical Songs (Billboard)	13
