= Better Late Than Never (Romeo Santos and Prince Royce album) =

2025 studio album by Romeo Santos and Prince Royce

Studio album by Romeo Santos and Prince Royce
- Released: November 28, 2025
- Recorded: 2024–2025
- Genre: Bachata
- Length: 50:13
- Languages: Spanish; English; Spanglish
- Labels: Sony Latin; I Love Amiguita Inc.

Romeo Santos chronology
Formula, Vol. 3 (2022)	Better Late Than Never (2025)

Prince Royce chronology
Eterno (2025)	Better Late Than Never (2025)

Singles from Better Late Than Never
- 1. "Estocolmo" Released: November 28, 2025; 2. "Lokita Por Mí" Released: January 2, 2026; 3. "Dardos" Released: February 13, 2026; 4. "Ay! San Miguel" Released: June 5, 2026; 5. "Menor" Released: October 1, 2026

Better Late Than Never is a collaborative album by American singers Romeo Santos and Prince Royce, released on November 28, 2025.

== Background ==
The album was released as a surprise, and was first teased on social media by Romeo Santos on Halloween. According to Romeo Santos' website, the collector's edition CD is limited to four units per customer.

== Promotion ==
Santos and Royce announced the 2026 Mejor Tarde Que Nunca Tour following the album's release. The tour has stops in the United States and Europe and will start on April 1, 2026 in Milwaukee, Wisconsin.

== Commercial performance ==
It debuted at number one on Top Tropical Albums with 23,000 equivalent album units earned in the United States.

== Track listing ==
All tracks are written by Anthony "Romeo" Santos. Prince Royce additionally has a writing credit on "Better Late Than Never".

No.	Title	Length
1.	"Better Late Than Never"	4:08
2.	"Estocolmo"	3:59
3.	"Lokita Por Mí"	3:59
4.	"Jezabel"	3:24
5.	"Dardos"	4:03
6.	"La Amaré"	4:17
7.	"Celeste"	3:09
8.	"Ay! San Miguel"	4:11
9.	"Encerrados"	3:40
10.	"Menor" (with Dalvin La Melodía)	3:22
11.	"Blanca Nieves"	3:34
12.	"Mi Plan"	3:43
13.	"La Última Bachata"	4:32
Total length:		50:06

== Charts ==
Weekly chart performance for Better Late Than Never
Chart (2025–2026)	Peak position
Italian Albums (FIMI)	73
Spanish Albums (Promusicae)	6
Swiss Albums (Schweizer Hitparade)	13
US Billboard 200	32
US Top Latin Albums (Billboard)	2
US Tropical Albums (Billboard)	1

== Certifications ==
Certifications for Better Late Than Never
Region	Certification	Certified units/sales
Spain (Promusicae)	Gold	20,000^{‡}
United States (RIAA)	2× Platinum (Latin)	120,000^{‡}
^{‡} Sales+streaming figures based on certification alone.
