= Mejor Tarde Que Nunca =

2026 concert tour by Romeo Santos and Prince Royce

- Tour by Romeo Santos and Prince Royce
- Associated album: Better Late Than Never
- Start date: April 1, 2026
- End date: November 14, 2026
- Legs: 3
- No. of shows: 72

Romeo Santos tour chronology
- Fórmula, Vol. 3: La Gira (2023); Mejor Tarde Que Nunca (2026)
Prince Royce chronology
| Eterno Tour (2025) | Mejor Tarde Que Nunca (2026) |

Mejor Tarde Que Nunca is a concert tour by American singers Romeo Santos and Prince Royce in support of their collaborative album, Better Late Than Never (2025). The name of the tour is the same as the album, but in Spanish. It began on April 1, 2026, in Milwaukee, Wisconsin.

DJ Babyface serves as the official DJ for the Mejor Tarde Que Nunca tour, delivering live musical mixes and engaging with the audience on stage. His sets revisit classic hits from Romeo Santos and Prince Royce, including iconic songs from Aventura, bringing some of the most memorable tracks of bachata to audiences throughout the tour.

== Announcement ==
Romeo Santos and Prince Royce revealed the first confirmed dates on December 16, 2025. Later, on January 5, 2026, additional shows were announced in Europe. On January 8, 2026, SFX Events announced a Palma de Mallorca, Spain, date. On January 13, 2026, Santos and Royce added one additional show each in Chicago and Dallas, along with two new dates in Canada. In March 2026, new dates en Mexico were announced.

== Tour dates ==
List of concerts, showing date, city, country, venue.
| Date (2026) | City | Country | Venue | |
|---|---|---|---|---|
| April 1 | Milwaukee | United States | Fiserv Forum | |
| April 2 | Chicago | United States | Allstate Arena | 13,678/13,678 (100%) |
| April 4 | Reading | United States | Santander Arena | |
| April 5 | Washington, DC | United States | Capital One Arena | |
| April 9 | Greensboro | United States | Greensboro Coliseum | |
| April 11 | Baltimore | United States | CFG Bank Arena | |
| April 17 | Boston | United States | TD Garden | |
| April 18 | Hartford | United States | PeoplesBank Arena | |
| April 19 | Elmont | United States | UBS Arena | |
| April 22 | Newark | United States | Prudential Center | |
| April 25 | Miami | United States | Kaseya Center | |
| April 26 | Tampa | United States | Benchmark International Arena | |
| April 29 | Orlando | United States | Kia Center | |
| April 30 | Atlanta | United States | State Farm Arena | |
| May 2 | San Antonio | United States | Frost Bank Center | |
| May 7 | Houston | United States | Toyota Center | |
| May 9 | Dallas | United States | American Airlines Center | |
| May 10 | Austin | United States | Moody Center | |
| May 13 | Sacramento | United States | Golden 1 Center | |
| May 14 | San Francisco | United States | Chase Center | |
| May 15 | Oakland | United States | Oakland Arena | |
| May 17 | Las Vegas | United States | T-Mobile Arena | |
| May 21 | Los Angeles | United States | Crypto.com Arena | |
| May 22 | Anaheim | United States | Honda Center | |
| May 23 | Fresno | United States | Save Mart Center | |
| May 24 | Ontario | United States | Toyota Arena | |
| May 28 | Montreal | Canada | Bell Centre | |
| May 29 | Toronto | Canada | Scotiabank Arena | |
| May 31 | Chicago | United States | Allstate Arena | 13,678/13,678 (100%) |
| June 25 | Seville | Spain | Plaza de España | 29,892/30,000 (99,64%) |
| June 26 | Fuengirola | Spain | Recinto Marenostrum-Sohail Castle | 17,765/17,765 (100%) |
| July 3 | Zaragoza | Spain | Ibercaja Stadium | 15,520/20,116 (77,16%) |
| July 4 | Pamplona | Spain | Navarra Arena | 11,850/11,850 (100%) |
| July 5 | Palma de Mallorca | Spain | Son Fusteret | 17,000/17,000 (100%) |
| July 9 | Naples | Italy | Ex Base Nato | 19,230/20,000 (96,15%) |
| July 10 | Milan | Italy | Fiera Milano | 12,520/15,000 (83,47) |
| July 11 | Barcelona | Spain | RCDE Stadium | 40,265/40,265 (100%) |
| July 12 | The Hague | Netherlands | Zuiderpark Stadium | 13,417/15,000 (89,45%) |
| July 17 | London | England | The O2 Arena | 12,656/14,056 (90,04%) |
| July 18 | Cologne | Germany | Lanxess Arena | 15,250/15,250 (100%) |
| July 19 | Paris | France | Accor Arena | 15,540/15,540 (100%) |
| July 23 | Murcia | Spain | Espacio Norte | 17,160/20,000 (85,8%) |
| July 24 | Valencia | Spain | Estadi Ciutat de València | 35,778/36,213 (98,8%) |
| July 25 | Madrid | Spain | Riyadh Air Metropolitano | 55,238/55,238 (100%) |
| July 30 | A Coruña | Spain | Port of A Coruña | 14,325/15,000 (95,5%) |
| August 1 | Santa Cruz de Tenerife | Spain | Port of Santa Cruz de Tenerife | 15,691/17,000 (92,3%) |
| August 2 | Santander | Spain | Campa de La Magdalena | 15,424/15,424 (100%) |
| August 13 | Ciudad De Guatemala | Guatemala | Estadio Cementos Progreso | 18,696/22,300 (83,84%) |
| August 15 | San Salvador | El Salvador | Estadio Cuscatlan | 20,678/22,976 (90%) |
| August 18 | San José | Costa Rica | Costa Rica National Stadium | 33,432/34,115 (98%) |
| August 21 | Manágua | Nicarágua | Estádio Nacional Soberania | 26,548/26,548 (100%) |
| August 23 | San Pedro Sula | Honduras | Estadio Olímpico Metropolitano | |
| August 29 | Panama City | Panama | Estadio Rommel Fernandez | |
| September 11 | Lima | Peru | National Stadium of Peru | |
| September 12 | Lima | Peru | National Stadium of Peru | |
| September 20 | Santiago | Chile | Estadio Monumental | |
| September 24 | Guayaquil | Ecuador | Estadio Modelo Alberto Spencer | |
| September 26 | Quito | Ecuador | Estádio Olímpico Atahualpa | |
| October 2 | Bogotá | Colombia | Vive Claro | |
| October 18 | Puebla | Mexico | Estadio Hermanos Serdán | |
| October 15 | Mérida | Mexico | Estadio Kukulkán | |
| October 20 | Querétaro | Mexico | Estadio Corregidora | |
| October 22 | Toluca | Mexico | Chivo Cordoba | |
| October 25 | Mexico City | Mexico | Palacio de los Deportes | |
| October 26 | Mexico City | Mexico | Palacio de los Deportes | |
| October 31 | Guadalajara | Mexico | Estadio Panamericano | |
| November 1 | León | Mexico | Explanada Poliforum | |
| November 4 | Monterrey | Mexico | Estadio Wallmart Park | |
| November 5 | Torreón | Mexico | Foro CCT | |
| November 7 | Willemstad | Curacao | Curacao Festival Center | |
| November 12 | Cordoba | Argentina | Estadio Kempes | |
| November 14 | Buenos Aires | Argentina | Estádio Veléz Sarsfield | |
