= Fórmula, Vol. 3: La Gira =

2023 concert tour by Romeo Santos

Fórmula Vol. 3: La Gira
- Tour by Romeo Santos
- Associated album: Fórmula, Vol. 3
- Start date: February 10, 2023
- End date: December 16, 2023
- Legs: 6
- No. of shows: 88
- Attendance: 1 million
- Box office: US$ 106.2 million

Romeo Santos concert chronology
- Utopía Tour (2019); Fórmula Vol. 3: La Gira (2023); Mejor Tarde Que Nunca (2026)

Fórmula, Vol. 3: La Gira (English: Fórmula, Vol. 3: The Tour) is a concert tour by American singer-songwriter Romeo Santos in support of his fifth studio album, Fórmula, Vol. 3 (2022). The tour dates and cities were announced individually through the Santos's social media. The tour began on February 10, 2023, in Lima, Peru, and ended on December 16, 2023, in Barcelona, Spain.

Breaking several records on tickets sales including nine consecutive sold-out shows at Movistar Arena in Santiago, Chile, and four consecutive nights at the Estadio Nacional in Lima, Peru, the tour had a total attendance of 1 million fans It was ranked the 5th most lucrative tour by a Latin Artist of 2023. The tour grossed over US$106.2 million. On September 19, 2024 it was ranked at 9th of the Top 10 Highest-Grossing Latin Tours in Billboard Boxscore History.

== Background ==
On October 19, 2019, Romeo Santos was certified by the Guinness World Records as the best selling tropical solo artist success of his albums Formula Vol. 1 (2011), Formula Vol.2 (2014) and Golden (2017). On September 1, 2022, Romeo Santos released his fifth studio album Formula Vol. 3, the third installment of the trilogy of the formula albums. On November 14, 2022, Santos announce through social media his intentions to tour on Early 2023 starting at Lima, Peru. However, unlike his others tours, the tour dates were announced through is social media and local press. In February 2023, the US dates were announced and the Europe dates in May of the same year.

== Tour dates ==
Date	City	Country	Venue
Latin America
February 10, 2023	Lima	Peru	Estadio Nacional
February 11, 2023	Lima	Peru	Estadio Nacional
February 12, 2023	Lima	Peru	Estadio Nacional
February 14, 2023	Lima	Peru	Estadio Nacional
February 24, 2023	Guayaquil	Ecuador	Estadio Modelo Alberto Spencer Herrera
February 25, 2023	Quito	Ecuador	Estadio Olímpico Atahualpa
March 4, 2023	Cali	Colombia	Estadio Olímpico Pascual Guerrero
March 7, 2023	Bogotá	Colombia	Movistar Arena
March 8, 2023	Bogotá	Colombia	Movistar Arena
March 21, 2023	Santiago	Chile	Movistar Arena
March 22, 2023	Santiago	Chile	Movistar Arena
March 23, 2023	Santiago	Chile	Movistar Arena
March 24, 2023	Santiago	Chile	Movistar Arena
March 25, 2023	Santiago	Chile	Movistar Arena
March 26, 2023	Santiago	Chile	Movistar Arena
March 28, 2023	Santiago	Chile	Movistar Arena
March 29, 2023	Santiago	Chile	Movistar Arena
March 30, 2023	Santiago	Chile	Movistar Arena
April 12, 2023	San Salvador	El Salvador	Estadio Cuscatlán
April 14, 2023	Guatemala City	Guatemala	Expalanda 5
April 21, 2023	Buenos Aires	Argentina	José Amalfitani Stadium
April 22, 2023	Buenos Aires	Argentina	José Amalfitani Stadium
May 6, 2023	Tegucigalpa	Honduras	Estadio Chochi Sosa
May 20, 2023	San Juan	Puerto Rico	Hiram Bithorn Stadium
May 21, 2023	San Juan	Puerto Rico	Hiram Bithorn Stadium
May 23, 2023	Panama City	Panama	Estádio Rod Carew
May 27, 2023	San Juan	Puerto Rico	Coliseo de Puerto Rico
May 28, 2023	San Juan	Puerto Rico	Coliseo de Puerto Rico
North America
June 3, 2023	Inglewood	United States	SoFi Stadium
June 9, 2023	New York City	United States	Citi Field
June 16, 2023	Miami	United States	LoanDepot Park
June 24, 2023	Houston	United States	Minute Maid Park
Europe
June 29, 2023	Zurich	Switzerland	Hallenstadion
June 30, 2023	Milan	Italy	Ticketmaster Arena
July 1, 2023	Paris	France	Accor Arena
July 2, 2023	London	United Kingdom	The O2
July 6, 2023	Madrid	Spain	Wizink Center
July 7, 2023	Madrid	Spain	Wizink Center
July 8, 2023	Madrid	Spain	Wizink Center
July 9, 2023	Madrid	Spain	Wizink Center
July 14, 2023	Rotterdam	Netherlands	Rotterdam Ahoy
July 15, 2023	Marbella	Spain	Finca de la Caridad
July 21, 2023	Murcia	Spain	FICA MURCIA
July 22, 2023	Valencia	Spain	Marina Sur
July 28, 2023	Zaragoza	Spain	Feria de Zaragoza
July 29, 2023	Gran Canaria	Spain	Anexo Estadio Gran Canaria
Latin America
August 4, 2023	Tijuana	Mexico	Estadio Caliente
August 6, 2023	Monterrey	Mexico	Estadio Mobil Super
August 11, 2023	Guadalajara	Mexico	Estadio Jalisco
August 13, 2023	Querétaro	Mexico	Estadio Corregidora
August 15, 2023	Mexico City	Mexico	Campo Marte
August 16, 2023	Mexico City	Mexico	Campo Marte
August 18, 2023	Veracruz	Mexico	Estadio Universitario Beto Ávila
August 20, 2023	Mérida	Mexico	Estadio Carlos Iturralde
August 25, 2023	Asunción	Paraguay	Jockey Club
September 16, 2023	Medellin	Colombia	Atanasio Girardot Stadium
North America II
October 4, 2023	Fresno	United States	Save Mart Center
October 6, 2023	San Francisco	United States	Chase Center
October 7, 2023	Oakland	United States	Oakland Arena
October 8, 2023	Inglewood	United States	Kia Forum
October 11, 2023	Ontario	United States	Toyota Arena
October 13, 2023	Las Vegas	United States	T-Mobile Arena
October 14, 2023	Phoenix	United States	Footprint Center
October 15, 2023	San Diego	United States	Pechanga Arena
October 17, 2023	El Paso	United States	Don Haskins Center
October 20, 2023	Edinburg	United States	Bert Ogben Arena
October 21, 2023	San Antonio	United States	AT&T Center
October 22, 2023	Dallas	United States	American Airlines Center
October 24, 2023	Rosemont	United States	Allstate Arena
October 27, 2023	Nashville	United States	Bridgestone Arena
October 28, 2023	Charlotte	United States	Spectrum Center
October 29, 2023	Charlotte	United States	Spectrum Center
November 2, 2023	Baltimore	United States	CFG Bank Arena
November 3, 2023	Reading	United States	Santander Arena
November 5, 2023	Washington, D.C.	United States	Capital One Arena
November 6, 2023	Boston	United States	TD Garden
November 7, 2023	Boston	United States	TD Garden
November 8, 2023	Newark	United States	Prudential Center
November 10, 2023	Brooklyn	United States	Barclays Center
November 12, 2023	Atlanta	United States	State Farm Arena
November 14, 2023	Orlando	United States	Amway Center
November 15, 2023	Tampa	United States	Amalie Arena
November 16, 2023	Hollywood	United States	Hard Rock Live
November 19, 2023	Hollywood	United States	Hard Rock Live
November 22, 2023	Montreal	Canada	Centre Bell
November 25, 2023	Toronto	Canada	Scotiabank Arena
Latin America II
November 29, 2023	Ambato	Ecuador	Estadio Bellavista
November 30, 2023	Cuenca	Ecuador	Estadio Alejandro Serrano Aguilar
December 2, 2023	Santa Cruz de la Sierra	Bolivia	Estadio Real Santa Cruz
December 8, 2023	Arequipa	Peru	Jardin de la Cerveza
December 9, 2023	Oranjestad	Aruba	Harbour Arena Aruba
December 10, 2023	Caracas	Venezuela	Base Aérea La Carlota
Europe
December 15, 2023	Barcelona	Spain	Fira de Barcelona
December 16, 2023	Barcelona	Spain	Fira de Barcelona

=== Box-office data ===
City	Country	Attendance	Box office
Santiago	Chile	117,611 / 117,611 (100%)	$9,633,701
