= Estocolmo (Romeo Santos and Prince Royce song) =

2025 song by Romeo Santos and Prince Royce

Single by Romeo Santos and Prince Royce

from the album Better Late Than Never
- Released: 28 November 2025
- Genre: Latin pop; bachata; tropical
- Length: 3:59
- Label: Sony Music Latin
- Songwriters: Anthony Santos; Alexander Caba; Jeffrey Nortey; Inassiah Emilio Parker; Carlos B. Mercader
- Producers: Romeo Santos; Inassiah Emilio Parker

Romeo Santos singles chronology
"Khé?" (2025)	"Estocolmo" (2025)	"Lokita Por Mí" (2025)

Prince Royce singles chronology
"El Reemplazo" (2025)	"Estocolmo" (2025)	"Lokita Por Mí" (2025)

Music video
- "Estocolmo" on YouTube

"Estocolmo" (lit. 'Stockholm') is a song recorded by American singers Romeo Santos and Prince Royce. It was written by Santos alongside four other songwriters, including Inassiah Emilio Parker, with production handled by Santos and Parker. The song was released by Sony Music Latin on November 28, 2025, as the first single from their collaborative studio album, Better Late Than Never (2025). The music video was released on the same day. It featured Love Island USA season 7 winner Amaya Espinal (a.k.a Amaya Papaya) and actor Jharrel Jerome.

== Charts ==
Chart performance for "Estocolmo"
Chart (2025–2026)	Peak position
Spain (Promusicae)	1
US Hot Latin Songs (Billboard)	13
US Hot Tropical Songs (Billboard)	4
US Tropical Airplay (Billboard)	24

== Certifications ==
Certifications and sales for "Estocolmo"
Region	Certification	Certified units/sales
United States (RIAA)	Platinum (Latin)	60,000^{‡}
^{‡} Sales+streaming figures based on certification alone.
