= List of Billboard Latin Rhythm Albums number ones of 2024 =

The Latin Rhythm Albums chart is a music chart published in Billboard magazine. The data is compiled by Nielsen SoundScan from a sample that includes music stores, music departments at electronics and department stores, internet sales (both physical and digital) and verifiable sales from concert venues in the United States. The chart is composed of studio, live, and compilation releases by Latin artists performing in the Latin hip hop, urban, dance and reggaeton, the most popular Latin Rhythm music genres.

== Albums ==
Chart date	Album	Artist(s)	Reference
January 6	Nadie Sabe Lo Que Va a Pasar Mañana	Bad Bunny	
January 13	Nadie Sabe Lo Que Va a Pasar Mañana	Bad Bunny	
January 20	Nadie Sabe Lo Que Va a Pasar Mañana	Bad Bunny	
January 27	Nadie Sabe Lo Que Va a Pasar Mañana	Bad Bunny	
February 3	Nadie Sabe Lo Que Va a Pasar Mañana	Bad Bunny	
February 10	Nadie Sabe Lo Que Va a Pasar Mañana	Bad Bunny	
February 17	Nadie Sabe Lo Que Va a Pasar Mañana	Bad Bunny	
February 24	Nadie Sabe Lo Que Va a Pasar Mañana	Bad Bunny	
March 2	Nadie Sabe Lo Que Va a Pasar Mañana	Bad Bunny	
March 9	Nadie Sabe Lo Que Va a Pasar Mañana	Bad Bunny	
March 16	Nadie Sabe Lo Que Va a Pasar Mañana	Bad Bunny	
March 23	Nadie Sabe Lo Que Va a Pasar Mañana	Bad Bunny	
March 30	Nadie Sabe Lo Que Va a Pasar Mañana	Bad Bunny	
April 6	Un Verano Sin Ti	Bad Bunny	
April 13	Un Verano Sin Ti	Bad Bunny	
April 20	Un Verano Sin Ti	Bad Bunny	
April 27	Un Verano Sin Ti	Bad Bunny	
May 4	Un Verano Sin Ti	Bad Bunny	
May 11	Un Verano Sin Ti	Bad Bunny	
May 18	Un Verano Sin Ti	Bad Bunny	
May 25	Un Verano Sin Ti	Bad Bunny	
June 1	Un Verano Sin Ti	Bad Bunny	
June 8	Un Verano Sin Ti	Bad Bunny	
June 15	Un Verano Sin Ti	Bad Bunny	
June 22	Un Verano Sin Ti	Bad Bunny	
June 29	Un Verano Sin Ti	Bad Bunny	
July 6	Un Verano Sin Ti	Bad Bunny	
July 13	Un Verano Sin Ti	Bad Bunny	
July 20	Un Verano Sin Ti	Bad Bunny	
July 27	Un Verano Sin Ti	Bad Bunny	
August 3	Un Verano Sin Ti	Bad Bunny	
August 10	Un Verano Sin Ti	Bad Bunny	
August 17	Un Verano Sin Ti	Bad Bunny	
August 24	Un Verano Sin Ti	Bad Bunny	
August 31	Un Verano Sin Ti	Bad Bunny	
September 7	Un Verano Sin Ti	Bad Bunny	
September 14	Un Verano Sin Ti	Bad Bunny	
September 21	Un Verano Sin Ti	Bad Bunny	
September 28	Un Verano Sin Ti	Bad Bunny	
October 5	Un Verano Sin Ti	Bad Bunny	
October 12	Un Verano Sin Ti	Bad Bunny	
October 19	Un Verano Sin Ti	Bad Bunny	
October 26	Un Verano Sin Ti	Bad Bunny	
November 2	Un Verano Sin Ti	Bad Bunny	
November 9	Un Verano Sin Ti	Bad Bunny	
November 16	Un Verano Sin Ti	Bad Bunny	
November 23	Un Verano Sin Ti	Bad Bunny	
November 30	Cosa Nuestra	Rauw Alejandro	
December 7	Cosa Nuestra	Rauw Alejandro	
December 14	Cosa Nuestra	Rauw Alejandro	
December 21	Cosa Nuestra	Rauw Alejandro	
December 28	Cosa Nuestra	Rauw Alejandro	
