= Papasito =

Single by Karol G

from the album Tropicoqueta
- Language: English; Spanish
- English title: "Hottie"
- Released: June 20, 2025
- Genre: Techno merengue
- Length: 2:47
- Label: Bichota; Interscope
- Songwriters: Carolina Giraldo Navarro; Daniel Echavarría Oviedo; Dani Raw; Daniel Uribe
- Producer: Ovy on the Drums

Karol G singles chronology
"Latina Foreva" (2025)	"Papasito" (2025)	"Ivonny Bonita" (2025)

Music video
- "Papasito" on YouTube

"Papasito" (transl. "Hottie") is a song by Colombian singer-songwriter Karol G. Written alongside Dani Raw, Daniel Uribe and Ovy on the Drums, and produced by the latter, the song was released on June 20, 2025, through Bichota Records and Interscope, as the third single from her third studio album, Tropicoqueta (2025).

== Background ==
On June 9, 2025, Karol G revealed the release for her then-upcoming fifth studio album, Tropicoqueta. During the following days, "Papasito" was teased through billboards in different cities, as other tracks from the album were revealed similarly. The song was officially released as a single on June 20, 2025, alongside the release of its parent album. It was later sent to Italian radios on September 26, 2025

== Commercial performance ==
On the US Billboard Hot 100 chart dated July 5, 2025, the song debuted and peaked at number 74.

On the US Billboard Hot Latin Songs chart dated July 5, 2025, the song debuted and peaked at number 5.

On the Billboard Global 200 the song reached the top 60 at number 56 on the chart dated July 5, 2025.

== Awards and nominations ==
Awards and nominations for "Papasito"
Year	Ceremony	Category	Result	Ref.
2026	Premios Nuestra Tierra	Best Global Song	Won	
2026	Premios Tu Música Urbano	Top Song — Tropical	Nominated	

== Music video ==
The music video was directed by Pedro Artola and was released on Karol G's YouTube channel on June 20, 2025.

The music video features a 1950s-inspired aesthetic and depicts a family celebration drawing on elements commonly associated with Latin American social gatherings. It also incorporates visual influences from Broadway-style cabaret performances. Actor Danny Ramírez appears alongside Karol G in the video.

== Live performances ==
Karol G performed "Papasito" for the first time on The Tonight Show Starring Jimmy Fallon on June 26, 2025. Giraldo appeared on the Spanish talk show La Revuelta on July 3, 2025, where she performed the song once again. In collaboration with Spotify, Karol G performed the song on July 21, 2025, for a small pop-up show on Paradise Club in New York City. On September 5, 2025, Karol G headlined the half time show for the season opener for the NFL in São Paulo, where the song was performed. "Papasito" was performed at the 2026 Coachella Valley Music and Arts Festival on April 12 and 19. From July 24, 2026, through June 24, 2027, Karol G is set to embark on the stadium Viajando Por El Mundo Tropitour, where the song is present throughout the set list.

== Charts ==
=== Weekly charts ===
Weekly chart performance for "Papasito"
Chart (2025–2026)	Peak position
Bolivia (Billboard)	8
Central America Airplay (Monitor Latino)	14
Central America + Caribbean (BMAT)	6
Chile (Billboard)	22
Chile Airplay (Monitor Latino)	5
Colombia (Colombia Hot 100)	27
Colombia Airplay (Monitor Latino)	2
Costa Rica Airplay (FONOTICA)	10
Costa Rica Airplay (Monitor Latino)	14
Ecuador (Billboard)	4
Ecuador Airplay (Monitor Latino)	1
El Salvador Airplay (ASAP EGC)	10
El Salvador Airplay (Monitor Latino)	7
Global 200 (Billboard)	56
Guatemala Airplay (Monitor Latino)	19
Nicaragua Airplay (Monitor Latino)	6
Panama International (PRODUCE)	23
Paraguay Airplay (Monitor Latino)	11
Peru (Billboard)	5
Peru Airplay (Monitor Latino)	1
Romania Airplay (TopHit)	88
San Marino Airplay (SMRTV Top 50)	32
Spain (PROMUSICAE)	21
Suriname (Nationale Top 40)	2
Uruguay Airplay (Monitor Latino)	12
US Billboard Hot 100	74
US Hot Latin Songs (Billboard)	5
US Hot Tropical Songs (Billboard)	1
Venezuela Airplay (Record Report)	9

=== Monthly charts ===
Monthly chart performance
Chart (2025)	Peak position
Paraguay Airplay (SGP)	22

=== Year-end charts ===
Year-end chart performance for "Papasito"
Chart (2025)	Position
Bolivia Airplay (Monitor Latino)	26
Central America Airplay (Monitor Latino)	73
Chile Airplay (Monitor Latino)	51

== Certifications ==
Certifications for "Papasito"
Region	Certification	Certified units/sales
Spain (Promusicae)	Gold	50,000^{‡}
^{‡} Sales+streaming figures based on certification alone.
