= List of Billboard Latin Rhythm Albums number ones of 2025 =

The Latin Rhythm Albums chart is a music chart published in Billboard magazine. The data is compiled by Nielsen SoundScan from a sample that includes music stores, music departments at electronics and department stores, internet sales (both physical and digital) and verifiable sales from concert venues in the United States. The chart is composed of studio, live, and compilation releases by Latin artists performing in the Latin hip hop, urban, dance and reggaeton, the most popular Latin Rhythm music genres.

== Albums ==
Chart date	Album	Artist(s)	Reference
January 4	Cosa Nuestra	Rauw Alejandro	
January 11	Cosa Nuestra	Rauw Alejandro	
January 18	Debí Tirar Más Fotos	Bad Bunny	
January 25	Debí Tirar Más Fotos	Bad Bunny	
February 1	Debí Tirar Más Fotos	Bad Bunny	
February 8	Debí Tirar Más Fotos	Bad Bunny	
February 15	Debí Tirar Más Fotos	Bad Bunny	
February 22	Debí Tirar Más Fotos	Bad Bunny	
March 1	Debí Tirar Más Fotos	Bad Bunny	
March 8	Debí Tirar Más Fotos	Bad Bunny	
March 15	Debí Tirar Más Fotos	Bad Bunny	
March 22	Debí Tirar Más Fotos	Bad Bunny	
March 29	Debí Tirar Más Fotos	Bad Bunny	
April 5	Debí Tirar Más Fotos	Bad Bunny	
April 12	Debí Tirar Más Fotos	Bad Bunny	
April 19	Debí Tirar Más Fotos	Bad Bunny	
April 26	Debí Tirar Más Fotos	Bad Bunny	
May 3	Debí Tirar Más Fotos	Bad Bunny	
May 10	Debí Tirar Más Fotos	Bad Bunny	
May 17	Debí Tirar Más Fotos	Bad Bunny	
May 24	Debí Tirar Más Fotos	Bad Bunny	
May 31	Debí Tirar Más Fotos	Bad Bunny	
June 7	Debí Tirar Más Fotos	Bad Bunny	
June 14	Debí Tirar Más Fotos	Bad Bunny	
June 21	Debí Tirar Más Fotos	Bad Bunny	
June 28	Debí Tirar Más Fotos	Bad Bunny	
July 5	Tropicoqueta	Karol G	
July 12	Tropicoqueta	Karol G	
July 19	Debí Tirar Más Fotos	Bad Bunny	
July 26	Debí Tirar Más Fotos	Bad Bunny	
August 2	Debí Tirar Más Fotos	Bad Bunny	
August 9	Debí Tirar Más Fotos	Bad Bunny	
August 16	Debí Tirar Más Fotos	Bad Bunny	
August 23	Debí Tirar Más Fotos	Bad Bunny	
August 30	Debí Tirar Más Fotos	Bad Bunny	
September 6	Debí Tirar Más Fotos	Bad Bunny	
September 13	Debí Tirar Más Fotos	Bad Bunny	
September 20	Debí Tirar Más Fotos	Bad Bunny	
September 27	Debí Tirar Más Fotos	Bad Bunny	
October 4	Debí Tirar Más Fotos	Bad Bunny	
October 11	Debí Tirar Más Fotos	Bad Bunny	
October 18	Debí Tirar Más Fotos	Bad Bunny	
October 25	Debí Tirar Más Fotos	Bad Bunny	
November 1	Debí Tirar Más Fotos	Bad Bunny	
November 8	Debí Tirar Más Fotos	Bad Bunny	
November 15	Debí Tirar Más Fotos	Bad Bunny	
November 22	Debí Tirar Más Fotos	Bad Bunny	
November 29	Debí Tirar Más Fotos	Bad Bunny	
December 6	Debí Tirar Más Fotos	Bad Bunny	
December 13	Debí Tirar Más Fotos	Bad Bunny	
December 20	Debí Tirar Más Fotos	Bad Bunny	
December 27	Debí Tirar Más Fotos	Bad Bunny	
