= List of number-one albums of 2025 (Spain) =

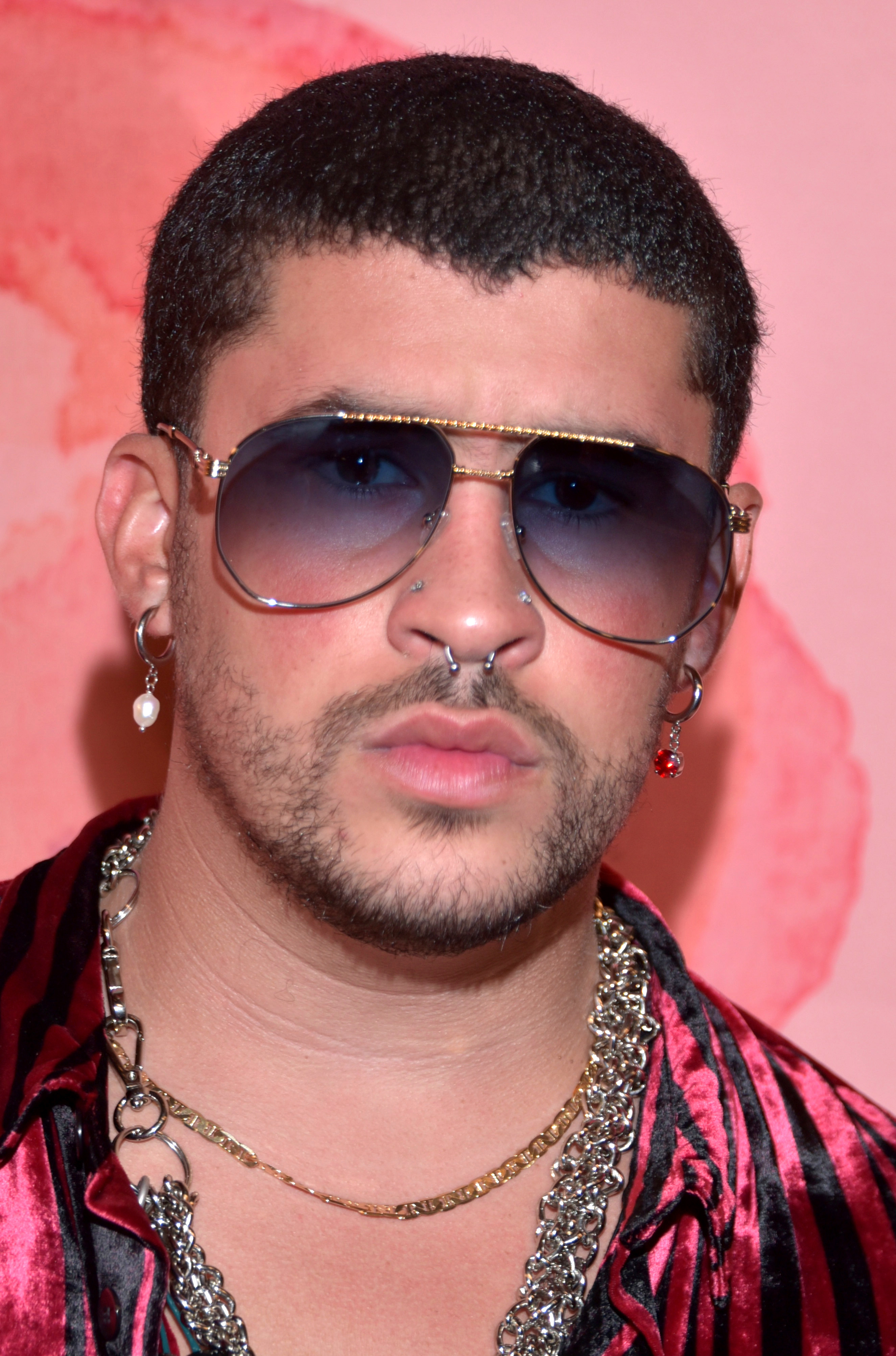
Bad Bunny Spent 22 weeks at number-one this year with Debí Tirar Más Fotos.

Top 100 España is a record chart published weekly by PROMUSICAE (Productores de Música de España), a non-profit organization composed of Spanish and multinational record companies. This association tracks both physical (including CDs and vinyl) and digital (digital download and streaming) record consumption and sales in Spain.

== Albums ==
Week	Chart date	Album	Artist(s)	Ref
1	December 27	Buenas Noches	Quevedo	
2	January 3	Debí Tirar Más Fotos	Bad Bunny	
3	January 10	Debí Tirar Más Fotos	Bad Bunny	
4	January 17	Debí Tirar Más Fotos	Bad Bunny	
5	January 24	Debí Tirar Más Fotos	Bad Bunny	
6	January 31	Debí Tirar Más Fotos	Bad Bunny	
7	February 7	Debí Tirar Más Fotos	Bad Bunny	
8	February 14	Debí Tirar Más Fotos	Bad Bunny	
9	February 21	Debí Tirar Más Fotos	Bad Bunny	
10	February 28	Debí Tirar Más Fotos	Bad Bunny	
11	March 7	Mayhem	Lady Gaga	
12	March 14	Debí Tirar Más Fotos	Bad Bunny	
13	March 21	Debí Tirar Más Fotos	Bad Bunny	
14	March 28	Debí Tirar Más Fotos	Bad Bunny	
15	April 4	Gigante	Leiva	
16	April 11	Debí Tirar Más Fotos	Bad Bunny	
17	April 18	Debí Tirar Más Fotos	Bad Bunny	
18	April 25	Cuentas Pendientes	Bunbury	
19	May 2	Debí Tirar Más Fotos	Bad Bunny	
20	May 9	Pueblo Salvaje II	Manuel Carrasco	
21	May 16	Lo Mismo de Siempre	Mora	
22	May 23	Lo Mismo de Siempre	Mora	
23	May 30	Cuarto azul	Aitana	
24	June 6	Cuarto azul	Aitana	
25	June 13	Cuarto azul	Aitana	
26	June 20	Tropicoqueta	Karol G	
27	June 27	Tropicoqueta	Karol G	
28	July 4	Tropicoqueta	Karol G	
29	July 11	Tropicoqueta	Karol G	
30	July 18	Debí Tirar Más Fotos	Bad Bunny	
31	July 25	Cuarto azul	Aitana	
32	August 1	Cuarto azul	Aitana	
33	August 8	Debí Tirar Más Fotos	Bad Bunny	
34	August 15	Debí Tirar Más Fotos	Bad Bunny	
35	August 22	Debí Tirar Más Fotos	Bad Bunny	
36	August 29	Man's Best Friend	Sabrina carpenter	
37	September 5	Debí Tirar Más Fotos	Bad Bunny	
38	September 12	Debí Tirar Más Fotos	Bad Bunny	
39	September 19	Debí Tirar Más Fotos	Bad Bunny	
40	September 26	Corazones Legendarios	Loquillo	
41	October 3	The Life of a Showgirl	Taylor Swift	
42	October 10	Hecho en Tiempos De Paz	Viva Suecia	
43	October 17	San Felices	La M.O.D.A.	
44	October 24	El Monte de Los Aullidos	Fito & Fitipaldis	
45	October 31	Drapaires Poligoneros	Manolo García	
46	November 7	Lux	Rosalía	
47	November 14	Lux	Rosalía	
48	November 21	Lux	Rosalía	
49	November 28	Lux	Rosalía	
50	December 5	Lux	Rosalía	
51	December 12	Lux	Rosalía	
52	December 19	Lux	Rosalía	
1	December 26	Lux	Rosalía	
