= Déjame Entrar (Rauw Alejandro song) =

2024 single by Rauw Alejandro

Single by Rauw Alejandro

from the album Cosa Nuestra
- Language: Spanish
- Released: July 18, 2024
- Genre: Afrobeats; dancehall; reggaeton
- Length: 4:14
- Label: Sony Latin; Duars
- Songwriter: Raúl Alejandro Ocasio Ruiz
- Producers: El Zorro; Dímelo Ninow; Kenobi; MAG; Mick Coogan; Tyler Spry

Rauw Alejandro singles chronology
"Touching the Sky" (2024)	"Déjame Entrar" (2024)	"Pasaporte" (2024)

Music video
- "Déjame Entrar" on YouTube

"Déjame Entrar" (transl. "Let Me In") is a song by Puerto Rican singer Rauw Alejandro. It was released for digital download and streaming on July 18, 2024, through Sony Music Latin and Duars Entertainment, as the second single from his fifth studio album, Cosa Nuestra (2024). A dancehall and reggaeton track, it was written solely and co-produced by Alejandro, with additional production being handled by Dímelo Ninow, Kenobi, MAG, Mick Coogan, and Tyler Spry.

Days prior to the song's official release, Alejandro debuted and performed "Déjame Entrar" at Today's Citi Concert Series. Its accompanying music video, featuring a cameo appearance from American actor Adrien Brody, was released along with the single. Following the release of Cosa Nuestra, "Déjame Entrar" re-entered the US Hot Latin Songs chart, reaching at a peak of number 11. It additionally entered the US Billboard Hot 100 for the first time, peaking at number 96. Further, it received a Latin platinum certification by the Recording Industry Association of America (RIAA).

== Background and composition ==
On July 7, 2023, Alejandro released his fourth studio album, Playa Saturno (2023). While announcing the album days before its release, he stated that he would take a short break from music and told his fans to enjoy the album for a while, as he was not sure when he would record another album. He later began teasing his fifth studio album and released its lead single "Touching the Sky" on May 20, 2024.

On July 12, 2024, he performed at Today's Citi Concert Series, where he debuted a song titled "Déjame Entrar", which he stated would be the second single for his then-upcoming album. "Déjame Entrar" was released for digital download and streaming on July 18, 2024. It was later included on his fifth studio album, Cosa Nuestra, on November 15, 2024, as its second track. Produced by El Zorro (Alejandro), Dímelo Ninow, Kenobi, MAG, Mick Coogan, and Tyler Spry, the song fuses three genres, including Afrobeats, dancehall, and reggaeton.

== Promotion and reception ==
The accompanying music video for "Déjame Entrar" was released on July 18, 2024, simultaneously with the single. The video begins with Alejandro being seen surfacing and laying down on a bathtub full of water. He is seen inside a taxi with American actor Adrien Brody as the taxi driver, where they both have a conversation at the end of the video. In another scene, he is seen singing and performing choreography inside an empty farm, where a sign reading as "Cosa Nuestra - Fall 2024" can be found in the background, ultimately revealing the title of his fifth studio album and teasing its possible release date.

"Déjame Entrar" initially debuted at number 12 on the US Hot Latin Songs chart. Following the release of Cosa Nuestra, the song re-entered the chart at a new peak of number 11. It additionally entered the US Billboard Hot 100 for the first time, peaking at number 96. Further, it received a Latin platinum certification by the Recording Industry Association of America (RIAA), for track-equivalent sales of over 60,000 units in the United States. Alejandro performed "Déjame Entrar" at the 2024 MTV Video Music Awards on September 11, 2024.

== Credits and personnel ==
Credits adapted from Tidal.

Musicians

- Rauw Alejandro – vocals
- Alexis Mangual – percussion
- Carlos Padrón – percussion
- Nino Segarra – percussion
- Cristian Mangual – bass
- Tyler Spry – guitar, keyboards
- Cristian Nieves – guitar

Technical

- Chris Gehringer – mastering
- Kenobi – engineering
- Josh Gudwin – mixing
- Atharva Dhenke – engineering assistance
- Felix Byrne – engineering assistance
- Will Quinnell – engineering assistance

== Charts ==
Chart performance for "Déjame Entrar"
Chart (2024–2025)	Peak position
Global 200 (Billboard)	157
Spain (Promusicae)	24
US Billboard Hot 100	96
US Hot Latin Songs (Billboard)	12
US Hot Latin Rhythm Songs (Billboard)	25

== Certifications ==
Certifications and sales for "Déjame Entrar"
Region	Certification	Certified units/sales
Mexico (AMPROFON)	Platinum	140,000^{‡}
Spain (Promusicae)	Gold	50,000^{‡}
United States (RIAA)	Platinum (Latin)	60,000^{‡}
Streaming
Central America (CFC)	Gold	3,500,000^{†}
^{‡} Sales+streaming figures based on certification alone.^{†} Streaming-only figures based on certification alone.
