= Khé? =

Single by Rauw Alejandro and Romeo Santos

from the album Cosa Nuestra
- Language: Spanish
- English title: "What?"
- Released: December 5, 2024
- Genre: R&B; reggaeton; bachata
- Length: 3:26
- Label: Sony Latin; Duars
- Songwriters: Raúl Alejandro Ocasio Ruiz; Anthony Romeo Santos; Andrea Mangiamarchi; Marvin Hawkins Rodríguez
- Producers: El Zorro; Romeo Santos; Mr. NaisGai; DJ Maff; Jhon el Diver; Isaiah Ennio Parker

Rauw Alejandro singles chronology
"Qué Pasaría..." (2024)	"Khé?" (2024)	"Se fué" (2024)

Romeo Santos singles chronology
"Ángel" (2024)	"Khé?" (2024)	"Estocolmo" (2025)

Music video
- "Khé?" on YouTube

"Khé?" (pronounced as "¿Qué?"; spanish for "What?") is a song by Puerto Rican singer Rauw Alejandro and American singer Romeo Santos. It was released on December 5, 2024, through Sony Music Latin and Duars Entertainment, as the fifth single of Alejandro's album Cosa Nuestra (2024).

== Background and release ==
When Rauw Alejandro revealed the track list and collaborations for Cosa Nuestra, that was when the song and collaboration with Romeo Santos was revealed as the twelfth track.

== Music and lyrics ==
Musically, "Khé?" it is a song that mixes pop with R&B at the beginning and then, at the end, reggaeton and some elements of bachata.

== Lyric video ==
A lyric video was released along with the rest of the lyric videos for Cosa Nuestra songs with their release on November 15, 2024. A woman is shown in a room first leaving a vacuum cleaner in its place, and then during the rest she lies on the bed with her books and notebooks while appearing to read and write something. Then, at the end, she closes the books and notebooks and sits on the bed thoughtfully.

== Music video ==
The music video was released on December 5, 2024. Made in black and white, several scenes are shown in which Rauw Alejandro appears with several colleagues on a stage and in a train station, other times Romeo Santos conquering and dancing with a woman. At the end of the video, Rauw Alejandro is seen entering the theater with a girl.

== Charts ==
=== Weekly charts ===
Weekly chart performance for "Khé?"
Chart (2024–2025)	Peak position
Argentina Hot 100 (Billboard)	24
Bolivia (Billboard)	1
Bolivia (Monitor Latino)	11
Central America (Monitor Latino)	5
Central America + Caribbean (FONOTICA)	2
Chile (Billboard)	15
Colombia (Billboard)	11
Costa Rica (FONOTICA)	1
Costa Rica (Monitor Latino)	5
Dominican Republic (Monitor Latino)	4
Ecuador (Billboard)	1
Ecuador (Monitor Latino)	3
El Salvador (Monitor Latino)	11
Global 200 (Billboard)	28
Guatemala (Monitor Latino)	11
Honduras (Monitor Latino)	10
Latin America (Monitor Latino)	3
Mexico (Billboard)	12
Nicaragua (Monitor Latino)	11
Panama (Monitor Latino)	3
Panama (PRODUCE)	9
Paraguay (IFPI Latin America)	1
Peru (Billboard)	1
Peru (Monitor Latino)	2
Puerto Rico (Monitor Latino)	6
Spain (Promusicae)	8
US Billboard Hot 100	60
US Hot Latin Songs (Billboard)	3
US Hot Latin Rhythm Songs (Billboard)	8
Venezuela (Monitor Latino)	16

=== Year-end charts ===
Year-end chart performance for "Khé?"
Chart (2025)	Position
Argentina Airplay (Monitor Latino)	93
Bolivia Airplay (Monitor Latino)	12
Central America Airplay (Monitor Latino)	12
Global 200 (Billboard)	131
US Hot Latin Songs (Billboard)	12

== Certifications ==
Certifications and sales for "Khé?"
Region	Certification	Certified units/sales
Mexico (AMPROFON)	Diamond+Platinum	840,000^{‡}
Spain (Promusicae)	Platinum	60,000^{‡}
Streaming
Central America (CFC)	Gold	3,500,000^{†}
^{‡} Sales+streaming figures based on certification alone.^{†} Streaming-only figures based on certification alone.

== See also ==
- List of Billboard Hot Latin Songs and Latin Airplay number ones of 2025
- List of Billboard number-one Latin rhythm songs of 2025
