= Lokita Por Mí =

2025 song by Romeo Santos and Prince Royce

Single by Romeo Santos and Prince Royce

from the album Better Late Than Never
- Released: 2 January 2026
- Genre: Latin pop; bachata; tropical
- Length: 3:59
- Label: Sony Music Latin
- Songwriters: Anthony Santos; Alexander Caba; Jeffrey Nortey; Inassiah Emilio Parker; Carlos B. Mercader
- Producers: Romeo Santos; Inassiah Emilio Parker

Romeo Santos and Prince Royce singles chronology
"Estocolmo" (2026)	"Lokita Por Mí" (2026)	"Dardos" (2026)

Music video
- "Lokita Por Mí" on YouTube

"Lokita Por Mí" (lit. 'Crazy About Me') is a song recorded by American singers Romeo Santos and Prince Royce. It was written by Santos alongside four other songwriters, including Inassiah Emilio Parker, with production handled by Santos and Parker. The song was released by Sony Music Latin on November 28, 2025, as the third track from their collaborative studio album, Better Late Than Never (2025). The music video for was officially released on January 2, 2026. It featured Dominican Rapper La Perversa, and Puerto Rican actor Shalim Ortiz.

== Charts ==
Chart performance for "Lokita Por Mí"
Chart (2025–2026)	Peak position
Colombia Hot 100 (Billboard)	18
Dominican Republic Airplay (Monitor Latino)	1
Puerto Rico Airplay (Monitor Latino)	1
Spain (Promusicae)	22
US Hot Latin Songs (Billboard)	11
US Latin Airplay (Billboard)	1
US Hot Tropical Songs (Billboard)	2
US Tropical Airplay (Billboard)	1

== Certifications ==
Certifications and sales for "Lokita Por Mí"
Region	Certification	Certified units/sales
Spain (Promusicae)	Gold	50,000^{‡}
United States (RIAA)	Platinum (Latin)	60,000^{‡}
^{‡} Sales+streaming figures based on certification alone.
