= Touching the Sky =

2024 single by Rauw Alejandro

Single by Rauw Alejandro

from the album Cosa Nuestra
- Language: Spanish
- Released: May 20, 2024
- Genre: Disco; electro-funk
- Length: 3:07
- Label: Sony Latin; Duars
- Songwriter: Raúl Alejandro Ocasio Ruiz
- Producers: El Zorro; Dímelo Ninow; Dulce como Candy; Kenobi; Smiileey

Rauw Alejandro singles chronology
"Espectacular" (2024)	"Touching the Sky" (2024)	"Déjame Entrar" (2024)

Music video
- "Touching the Sky" on YouTube

"Touching the Sky" is a song by Puerto Rican singer Rauw Alejandro. It was released for digital download and streaming on May 20, 2024, through Sony Music Latin and Duars Entertainment, as the lead single from his fifth studio album, Cosa Nuestra (2024). A disco and electro-funk song, it was written solely by Alejandro, while production was also handled by him, along with Dímelo Ninow, Dulce como Candy, Kenobi and Smiileey.

"Touching the Sky" received generally positive reviews by music critics, who were impressed by its sound. It peaked within the top 10 of charts in four countries and peaked atop the US Latin Pop Airplay chart. Its music video was released on three days after the single's release, May 23, 2024, which was directed by Martin Seipel and produced by Rocío Taboada.

== Background and composition ==
On July 7, 2023, Alejandro released his fourth studio album, Playa Saturno (2023). While announcing the album days before its release, he stated that he would take a short break from music and told his fans to enjoy the album for a while, as he was not sure when he would record another album. He later began teasing his fifth studio album with the release of the single "Touching the Sky", which he considered the beginning of a "new era".

"Touching the Sky" was released for digital download and streaming on June 8, 2024, though Sony Music Latin and Duars Entertainment. It was later included on his fifth studio album, Cosa Nuestra, on November 15, 2024, as its lead single and fifteenth track. Musically, "Touching the Sky" is a disco and electro-funk song.

== Reception ==
"Touching the Sky" was received well by music critics, who were impressed by its sound. In a positive review, Nicole Collazo Santana of Today stated that the song "brings a flirty, summer energy". Jovita Trujillo from ¡Hola! called the song a "breath of fresh air to the modern reggaeton beat" that "[they] are used to hearing the Puerto Rican singer on". At the Los 40 Music Awards 2024, "Touching the Sky" won Best Video under the Global Latin category, while Alejandro also received six more nominations.

The song peaked atop the US Latin Pop Airplay chart on the issue dated August 24, 2024, while it peaked at number 23 on the main Latin Airplay chart. On September 23, 2024, it received a platinum Latin certification by the Recording Industry Association of America (RIAA), for track-equivalent sales of over 60,000 units in the United States. In Latin America, it peaked within the top 10 in four countries, including Chile (10), El Salvador (8), Panama (9), and Puerto Rico (5).

== Promotion ==
Its music video was released on May 23, 2024. Directed by Martin Seipel and produced by Rocío Taboada, it features Alejandro dancing in the streets of New York City. On September 11, 2024, Alejandro performed "Touching the Sky", along with "Déjame Entrar" and "Diluvio", at the 2024 MTV Video Music Awards.

== Credits and personnel ==
Credits adapted from Tidal.

Musicians

- Rauw Alejandro – vocals
- Dímelo Ninow – synthesizer, electronic drums, keyboards
- Dulce como Candy – background vocals, synthesizer
- El Zorro – electronic drums

Technical

- Chris Gehringer – mastering
- Kenobi – mastering, engineering
- Josh Gudwin – mixing
- Atharva Dhenke – engineering assistance
- Will Quinnell – engineering assistance

== Charts ==
Chart performance for "Touching the Sky"
Chart (2024)	Peak position
Argentina (Monitor Latino)	16
Chile (Monitor Latino)	10
El Salvador (Monitor Latino)	8
Honduras Pop (Monitor Latino)	5
Panama (Monitor Latino)	9
Puerto Rico (Monitor Latino)	5
Spain (Promusicae)	44
US Hot Latin Songs (Billboard)	22
US Latin Airplay (Billboard)	23
US Latin Pop Airplay (Billboard)	1
Venezuela (Monitor Latino)	17

== Certifications ==
Certifications and sales for "Touching the Sky"
Region	Certification	Certified units/sales
United States (RIAA)	Platinum (Latin)	60,000^{‡}
^{‡} Sales+streaming figures based on certification alone.
