= Cosa Nuestra (Rauw Alejandro album) =

2024 studio album by Rauw Alejandro

- Standard album cover

Studio album by Rauw Alejandro
- Released: November 15, 2024
- Recorded: 2024
- Studios: Electric Garden (Brooklyn); 5020 Studio (Miami); Sensei Sound (Carolina, Puerto Rico)
- Genres: Reggaeton; salsa
- Length: 66:59
- Languages: Spanish; English
- Labels: Duars; Sony Latin
- Producers: El Zorro; Dímelo Ninow; Dulce como Candy; Kenobi; Smiileey; Tyler Spry

Rauw Alejandro chronology
| Playa Saturno (2023) | Cosa Nuestra (2024) | Cosa Nuestra: Capítulo 0 (2025) |

Singles from Cosa Nuestra
- 1. "Touching the Sky" Released: May 23, 2024; 2. "Déjame Entrar" Released: July 18, 2024; 3. "Pasaporte" Released: September 26, 2024; 4. "Qué Pasaría..." Released: November 29, 2024; 5. "Khé?" Released: December 5, 2024; 6. "Se Fue" Released: December 20, 2024; 7. "Ni Me Conozco" Released: February 11, 2025

Cosa Nuestra (transl. Our Thing) is the fifth studio album by Puerto Rican singer Rauw Alejandro. It was released on November 15, 2024, through Sony Music Latin and Duars Entertainment. Guest appearances in the album include Bad Bunny, Pharrell Williams, Alexis & Fido, Feid, Romeo Santos, Laura Pausini and Latin Mafia, among others. Recording for the album took place at Electric Garden in Brooklyn, 5020 Studio in Miami and Sensei Sound in Carolina, Puerto Rico, with the entire album being executively produced by Alejandro. He worked with several producers, including Tainy, Cauty, Mr. NaisGai and Dímelo Ninow, on the album's production.

Primarily noted as a salsa and reggaeton album, its title is in reference to Willie Colón and Héctor Lavoe's 1969 album of the same name, while the album's concept is inspired by the 1970s and New York City. It was supported by six singles, "Touching the Sky", "Déjame Entrar", "Pasaporte", the Bad Bunny collaboration "Qué Pasaría..." the Romeo Santos collaboration "Khé?", and the Laura Pausini collaboration "Se fue". Upon release, the album received positive reviews from contemporary music critics, who praised the diversity of genres throughout the album and the singer's versatility.

== Background ==
On July 4, 2023, while announcing and releasing his fourth studio album, Playa Saturno (2023), Alejandro stated that he would "rest" and told his fans to enjoy the album for a while, as he was not sure when he would record another album. On March 7, 2024, he revealed information about his fifth studio album during a video call with CR Fashion Book, where he stated that he would start a new era in his career. He also revealed that the album would still be executively produced by him, but was also learning to play other instruments, including the drums, piano and guitar.

On June 8, 2024, he further revealed to Billboard Español that he was inspired by the musical West Side Story for his live performances and album, later teasing his fifth studio album to Today by considering the songs from it being "too good to be inside the studio". On July 18 of the same year, the album's title was revealed as Cosa Nuestra through the music video for "Déjame Entrar", the album's second single, with its release being around autumn of 2024; the album's title is in reference to salsa musicians Willie Colón and Héctor Lavoe's 1969 album of the same name, while also drawing from the sicilian mafia Cosa Nostra. Rauw Alejandro has also mentioned a personal connection to Sicily, as his great-grandfather was from Palermo.

== Concept and recording ==
After Alejandro performed a cover of Italian singer Laura Pausini's song "Non c'è" ("Se fue") at the 24th Annual Latin Grammy Awards on November 16, 2023, he revealed during an interview that both were working on a studio and duet version of the song together, becoming a collaboration that was highly anticipated among fans. The track listing for Cosa Nuestra was revealed on November 11, 2024, with the song being featured as its thirteenth track.

For the album's concept, Alejandro created a character named after his first and middle name, Raúl Alejandro, which he says gives off a "telenovela vibe". He pictures his character as an adult living in New York City during the era of Puerto Rican migration to New York City. Because he does not like "repeating projects", he visualized the album's direction plans for a long period of time, stating to Billboard, "I sit at home, read a book, smoke a joint with some coffee, look at the sky, and map out what's coming." Though it is his fifth studio album, Alejandro considers Cosa Nuestra his fourth album "of the circles", referring to his first three studio albums, which have circles on their album artworks.

== Music and lyrics ==
Cosa Nuestra has been described as mainly a salsa and reggaeton album, containing fusions of other genres such as Afrobeats, bachata, bolero, cha-cha-chá, conga, country, dembow, disco, electronic, funk, hip-hop, jazz, Latin ballad, Latin pop, Latin R&B, Latin soul, Latin trap, lo-fi, mambo, merengue, rock, rumba, sandungueo, son, and synth-pop within its 18 tracks. Andrew Sacher of BrooklynVegan noted the album's live instrumentation being heard more than Alejandro's previous albums.

A collaboration with fellow Puerto Rican rapper Bad Bunny, "Qué Pasaría..." is a reggaeton song which features lyrics that mainly focus on two people reflecting on their relationship. The fourth track from Cosa Nuestra, "Tú con Él" is a salsa cover of Frankie Ruiz's song of the same name. Alejandro also sings in English on the album's fifth track, "Committed", a collaboration with American musician Pharrell Williams which also contains Spanish-language lyrics.

== Promotion and release ==
Cosa Nuestra was released for digital download and streaming on November 15, 2024, through Sony Music Latin and Duars Entertainment. Alejandro performed "Touching the Sky" and "Déjame Entrar" at the 2024 MTV Video Music Awards on September 11, 2024. On November 19, 2024, Alejandro performed "Qué Pasaría..." and "Amar de Nuevo" on The Tonight Show Starring Jimmy Fallon. The album was released on vinyl on November 15, 2024, and on CD on December 13, 2024.

== Singles ==
"Touching the Sky" was released on May 23, 2024, serving as the lead single from Cosa Nuestra. Its accompanying music video, which was directed by Martin Seipel and produced by Rocío Taboada, features Alejandro dancing in the streets of New York City. It peaked atop the US Latin Pop Airplay chart on the issue dated August 24, 2024, while it also peaked within the top 10 in four Latin American countries, including Chile (10), El Salvador (8), Panama (9), and Puerto Rico (5). On September 23, 2024, it received a platinum Latin certification by the Recording Industry Association of America (RIAA), for track-equivalent sales of over 60,000 units in the United States. "Déjame Entrar" was released on July 18, 2024, as the second single from the album, along with its music video, which features a cameo appearance from American actor Adrien Brody.

"Pasaporte" was released on September 26, 2024, as the third single from the album. An accompanying music video was released simultaneously with the song. "Qué Pasaría..." was serviced to Italian radio on November 29, 2024, serving as the album's fourth single. Following the album's release, the song reached the summit of the singles chart in Spain, with the addition of peaking at number 34 on the US Billboard Hot 100, number two on the US Hot Latin Songs chart, and within the top 10 in several countries including Bolivia (7), Chile (6), Ecuador (5), Mexico (9), and Peru (6). "Khé?" with American singer Romeo Santos, was released as the album's fifth single on December 5, 2024. The song peaked atop the song charts in Bolivia, Ecuador, and Peru, while peaking at number 60 on the US Billboard Hot 100, number three on the US Hot Latin Songs chart, and number eight in Spain. "Se fue", a collaboration with Italian singer Laura Pausini and a cover of a song originally performed by Pausini, was released as a single on December 20, 2024.

== Critical reception ==
Professional ratings
Review scores
| Source | Rating |
|---|---|
| AllMusic | 4/5 stars |
| Pitchfork | 6.8/10 |
| Rolling Stone | 3.5/5 stars |
| Rolling Stone en Español | 5/5 stars |

In a rave review, Diego Ortiz and Pablo Monroy from Rolling Stone en Español were impressed by Alejandro's versatility, stating that, "The Puerto Rican reaches his creative peak with elegance and precision, positioning himself as an artist who transcends genres and who has the technical, artistic and cultural capabilities to exploit wherever he puts himself".

== Commercial performance ==
In the United States, Cosa Nuestra debuted at number six on the Billboard 200 with 67,000 album-equivalent units, which consisted of 87.66 million official streams and 1,000 digital downloads in the country. It became his biggest album debut and his first top-10 album on the chart. In its second week of the chart, the album fell one place down to number seven, garnering 44,000 additional units. In addition, it debuted atop the US Top Latin Albums and Latin Rhythm Albums charts, becoming his first number-one album on both charts since his second studio album, Vice Versa. All of the album's tracks either debuted or re-entered the US Hot Latin Songs chart, with "Qué Pasaría..." being the highest charting track from it and five tracks charting within the top 10.

In Spain, the album debuted atop the album chart published by Productores de Música de España, while it debuted at number four on its vinyl sales chart. Additionally, 16 of its tracks were charting on its top 100 singles chart, with "Qué Pasaría..." peaking at number one. It also appeared on album charts in three other countries, including Belgium's Flanders and Wallonia regions, Italy, and Switzerland.

== Track listing ==
Cosa Nuestra track listing
| No. | Title | Writer(s) | Producer(s) | Length |
|---|---|---|---|---|
| 1. | "Cosa Nuestra" | Raúl Ocasio Ruiz | Dímelo Ninow; El Zorro; Kenobi | 4:20 |
| 2. | "Déjame Entrar" | Ocasio Ruiz | El Zorro; Mag; Mick Coogan; Tyler Spry; Dímelo Ninow^{[c]}; Kenobi^{[c]} | 4:14 |
| 3. | "Qué Pasaría..." (with Bad Bunny) | Ocasio Ruiz; Benito Martínez Ocasio | El Zorro; Mag; Coogan^{[c]}; Red Fingers^{[c]} | 3:11 |
| 4. | "Tú con Él" | Eduardo Franco da Silva | Dímelo Ninow; El Zorro; Frank Torres; Kenobi^{[c]} | 4:49 |
| 5. | "Committed" (with Pharrell Williams) | Ocasio Ruiz; Pharrell Williams | Williams; Dímelo Ninow^{[c]}; El Zorro^{[c]}; Kenobi^{[c]} | 2:39 |
| 6. | "Espresso Martini" (with Marconi Impara and Yan Block) | Ocasio Ruiz; Carlos Martín Marrero; Marcos Mercado Mota; Christian Mojica Blanco | Dímelo Ninow; El Zorro; Kenobi | 3:11 |
| 7. | "Baja Pa' Acá" (with Alexis & Fido) | Ocasio Ruiz; Raúl Alexis Ortíz; Joel Fido Martínez; Mojica Blanco | Dímelo Ninow; El Zorro^{[c]}; Kenobi^{[c]} | 3:20 |
| 8. | "Ni Me Conozco" | Ocasio Ruiz | Johan Arjona; Dímelo Ninow; El Zorro; Kenobi^{[c]} | 3:49 |
| 9. | "Il Capo" | Ocasio Ruiz | Bass Charity; El Zorro; Mag; Dímelo Ninow^{[c]} | 4:09 |
| 10. | "Revolú" (with Feid) | Ocasio Ruiz; Salomón Villada Hoyos; Mojica Blanco | Cauty; Dímelo Ninow; El Zorro | 3:35 |
| 11. | "Mil Mujeres" | Ocasio Ruiz | Dímelo Ninow; El Zorro; Kenobi^{[c]} | 2:48 |
| 12. | "Khé?" (with Romeo Santos) | Ocasio Ruiz; Anthony Santos; Andrea Mangiamarchi; Marvin Hawkins | DJ Maff; El Zorro; Jhon el Diver; Mr. NaisGai; Romeo Santos; Isaiah Ennio Parker^{[c]} | 3:26 |
| 13. | "Se Fue" (with Laura Pausini) | Ignacio Ballesteros Díaz; Federico Cavalli; Pietro Cremonesi; Arcangelo Valsiglio | Mr. NaisGai | 4:00 |
| 14. | "Pasaporte" (with Mr. NaisGai) | Ocasio Ruiz; Luis González Maldonado | El Zorro; Mr. NaisGai; SG Lewis; Dímelo Ninow^{[c]}; Kenobi^{[c]} | 4:26 |
| 15. | "Touching the Sky" | Ocasio Ruiz | Dímelo Ninow; Dulce como Candy; El Zorro; Kenobi; Smiileey | 3:07 |
| 16. | "Amar de Nuevo" | Ocasio Ruiz; Mojica Blanco | Johan Arjona; Spry; Dímelo Ninow^{[c]} | 4:28 |
| 17. | "2:12 AM" (with Latin Mafia) | Ocasio Ruiz; Emilio de la Rosa Marroquín; Miguel de la Rosa Marroquín; Milton de la Rosa Marroquín | Tainy; Dímelo Ninow^{[c]}; El Zorro^{[c]}; Kenobi^{[c]} | 3:31 |
| 18. | "SexxxMachine" | Ocasio Ruiz; Mojica Blanco | El Zorro; Kenobi; Lokey; Smart; Timbaland; Dímelo Ninow^{[c]} | 3:56 |
| Total length: | | | | 66:59 |

Note

- ^{^[c]} signifies a co-producer.

== Personnel ==
Musicians

- Rauw Alejandro – vocals
- Alexis Mangual – percussion (tracks 1, 2, 5, 6, 16), drums (17)
- Cristian Mangual – bass (tracks 1, 2, 5, 14, 16, 17), guitar (13)
- Carlos Padrón – timbales (tracks 1, 4, 5, 11), percussion (2), congas (4, 5)
- Juan Quinones – trumpet (tracks 1, 4, 5, 11), flugelhorn (5)
- Jose Rosa – background vocals (tracks 1, 4, 11, 16)
- Francis Diaz – background vocals (tracks 1, 11)
- Gerardo Danner – background vocals (tracks 1, 11)
- Jorge Buchaca – background vocals (tracks 1, 11)
- Kenobi – background vocals (tracks 1, 16)
- Nino Segarra – percussion (track 2), background vocals (4)
- Tyler Spry – guitar, keyboards (track 2); synthesizer (6)
- Cristian Nieves – guitar (track 2)
- Mag – drums, synthesizer (tracks 3, 9)
- Mick Coogan – synthesizer (tracks 3, 16)
- Red Fingers – synthesizer (track 3)
- Jorge Pizarro – background vocals (track 4)
- Alexis Perez – bass (track 4)
- Javier "Tito" Álvarez – percussion (track 4)
- Ronald Quiroz – piano (track 4)
- Moises Cancel – trombone (track 4)
- Bass Charity – synthesizer (track 9)
- Mr. NaisGai – synthesizer (track 14)
- SG Lewis – synthesizer (track 14)
- Dímelo Ninow – synthesizer (tracks 15, 17); electronic drums, keyboards (15)
- Dulce como Candy – background vocals, synthesizer (track 15)
- El Zorro – electronic drums (track 15)

Technical

- Chris Gehringer – mastering (tracks 1–6, 8–18)
- Kenobi – mastering (tracks 1, 4–14, 16–18), engineering (2–18)
- José M. Collazo – mastering (7), mixing (7)
- Josh Gudwin – mixing (tracks 1, 2, 4–6, 8–18)
- Mag – mixing (track 3)
- Dímelo Ninow – engineering (track 1)
- Atharva Dhenke – engineering assistance (tracks 1–6, 8–18)
- Will Quinnell – engineering assistance (tracks 1–6, 8–18)
- Felix Byrne – engineering assistance (track 2)
- Juan Angel Segarra – performance arrangement (track 4)
- Nino Segarra – performance arrangement (track 4)
- Mr. NaisGai – performance arrangement (track 13)

== Charts ==
=== Weekly charts ===
Weekly chart performance for Cosa Nuestra
| Chart (2024) | Peak position |
|---|---|
| Belgian Albums (Ultratop Flanders) | 161 |
| Belgian Albums (Ultratop Wallonia) | 147 |
| Canadian Albums (Billboard) | 64 |
| Italian Albums (FIMI) | 30 |
| Portuguese Albums (AFP) | 47 |
| Spanish Albums (Promusicae) | 1 |
| Swiss Albums (Schweizer Hitparade) | 10 |
| US Billboard 200 | 6 |
| US Latin Rhythm Albums (Billboard) | 1 |
| US Top Latin Albums (Billboard) | 1 |

=== Year-end charts ===
Year-end chart performance for Cosa Nuestra
| Chart (2025) | Position |
|---|---|
| US Billboard 200 | 60 |
| US Top Latin Albums (Billboard) | 4 |

== Certifications ==
Certifications for Cosa Nuestra
| Region | Certification | Certified units/sales |
|---|---|---|
| Italy (FIMI) | Gold | 25,000^{‡} |
| Mexico (AMPROFON) | 3× Platinum | 420,000^{‡} |
| Spain (Promusicae) | Platinum | 40,000^{‡} |
| United States (RIAA) | 6× Platinum (Latin) | 360,000^{‡} |
Streaming
| Central America (CFC) | Gold | 3,500,000^{†} |
^{‡} Sales+streaming figures based on certification alone.^{†} Streaming-only figures based on certification alone.

== See also ==
- 2024 in Latin music
- List of number-one Billboard Latin Albums from the 2020s
- List of number-one Billboard Latin Rhythm Albums of 2024
- List of number-one Billboard Latin Rhythm Albums of 2025
