= Dardos =

2025 song by Romeo Santos and Prince Royce

Single by Romeo Santos and Prince Royce

from the album Better Late Than Never
- Released: 28 November 2025
- Genre: Latin pop; bachata; tropical
- Length: 4:04
- Label: Sony Music Latin
- Songwriters: Anthony Santos; Alexander Caba; Jeffrey Nortey; Inassiah Emilio Parker; Carlos B. Mercader
- Producers: Romeo Santos; Inassiah Emilio Parker

Romeo Santos and Prince Royce singles chronology
"Lokita Por Mí" (2026)	"Dardos" (2025)	"Ay! San Miguel" (2026)

Music video
- "Dardos" on YouTube

"Dardos" (lit. 'Darts') is a song recorded by American singers Romeo Santos and Prince Royce. It was written by Santos alongside four other songwriters, including Inassiah Emilio Parker, with production handled by Santos and Parker. The song was released by Sony Music Latin on November 28, 2025, as the fifth track from their collaborative studio album, Better Late Than Never (2025).

== Background and composition ==
Romeo Santos and Prince Royce first collaborated secretly in 2018, using superhero names like Batman and Robin respectively. Some time later, Santos considered releasing an album with him. At Madison Square Garden, prior to the official release, they presented the album as a surprise.

"Dardos" is a bachata that blends guitars, drums, and various acoustic sounds. Some background vocals can be heard in the song's chorus.

== Music video ==
The music video for "Dardos" was officially released on February 13, 2026, on Santos' YouTube channel. It features the two of them in front of a wall with a dartboard, Santos in an hourglass, Royce, and the two of them at a party dancing with girls, and also showing them toasting. A guitarist can also be seen playing guitar through a speaker at the party, and there is a scene where Romeo is smoking.

== Charts ==
Chart performance for "Dardos"
Chart (2025–2026)	Peak position
Argentina Hot 100 (Billboard)	21
Bolivia (Billboard)	10
Bolivia Airplay (Monitor Latino)	2
Central America Airplay (Monitor Latino)	4
Chile (Billboard)	15
Chile Airplay (Monitor Latino)	1
Colombia Hot 100 (Billboard)	17
Costa Rica Airplay (FONOTICA)	1
Costa Rica Airplay (Monitor Latino)	1
Dominican Republic Airplay (Monitor Latino)	2
Ecuador (Billboard)	4
Global Excl. US (Billboard)	130
Nicaragua Airplay (Monitor Latino)	12
Panama Airplay (Monitor Latino)	9
Paraguay Airplay (Monitor Latino)	7
Peru (Billboard)	22
Peru Airplay (Monitor Latino)	1
Puerto Rico Airplay (Monitor Latino)	1
Spain (Promusicae)	1
US Bubbling Under Hot 100 (Billboard)	14
US Hot Latin Songs (Billboard)	8
US Latin Airplay (Billboard)	1
US Hot Tropical Songs (Billboard)	2
US Tropical Airplay (Billboard)	1
Venezuela Airplay (Monitor Latino)	7

== Certifications ==
Certifications and sales for "Dardos"
Region	Certification	Certified units/sales
Mexico (AMPROFON)	Gold	70,000^{‡}
Spain (Promusicae)	3× Platinum	300,000^{‡}
United States (RIAA)	6× Platinum (Latin)	360,000^{‡}
^{‡} Sales+streaming figures based on certification alone.
