= +57 (song) =

2024 single by Karol G, Feid and DFZM

Single by Karol G, Feid and DFZM featuring Ovy on the Drums, J Balvin, Maluma, Ryan Castro and Blessd
- Language: Spanish
- Released: November 7, 2024
- Recorded: 2024
- Genre: Reggaeton
- Length: 4:58
- Label: Bichota; Interscope
- Songwriters: Carolina Giraldo Navarro; Salomón Villada Hoyos; Dylan Ferney Zambrano Montaño; Daniel Echavarría Oviedo; José Álvaro Osorio Balvin; Juan Luis Londoño Arias; Bryan David Castro Sosa; Stiven Mesa Londoño; Kevyn Mauricio Cruz Moreno
- Producer: Ovy on the Drums

Karol G singles chronology
"No Me Cansare" (2024)	"+57" (2024)	"Latina Foreva" (2025)

Feid singles chronology
"Ferxxoko" (2024)	"+57" (2024)	"PPCP" (2024)

DFZM singles chronology
"Ayy Gono" (2024)	"+57" (2024)	"La Punta del Peak" (2025)

Ovy on the Drums singles chronology
"Mírala" (2024)	"+57" (2024)	"SQ (W Sound 04)" (2024)

J Balvin singles chronology
"Sornero" (2024)	"+57" (2024)	"Rio" (2025)

Maluma singles chronology
"Ohnana" (remix) (2024)	"+57" (2024)	"Cosas Pendientes" (2024)

Ryan Castro singles chronology
"FDSR" (2024)	"+57" (2024)	"SQ (W Sound 04)" (2024)

Blessd singles chronology
"Polos Opuestos" (remix) (2024)	"+57" (2024)	"Deportivo" (2024)

Music video
- "+57" on YouTube

"+57" is a song by all-Colombian singers Karol G, Feid and DFZM featuring Ovy on the Drums, J Balvin, Maluma, Ryan Castro and Blessd. It was released on November 7, 2024, through Bichota Records and Interscope. The song was written by all the performers and Keityn, and produced by Ovy on the Drums. The title of the song refers to the Colombian telephone prefix.

== Background ==
The song was announced on November 4, 2024, through Karol G's social media platforms.

== Critical reception and controversy ==
Writing in a negative review for Rolling Stone en Español, Martín Toro cited "+57" as "disappointing" and stated that the song, "despite the presence of so many talented artists, none manage to stand out in a memorable way. The song's structure, based on repetitive verses and generic lines, prevents each singer's individual qualities from shining through."

The song also received criticism and controversy due to a lyric in the song that said: "Mamacita desde los fourteen". Due to that, on November 11, 2024, Karol G issued an apology through her Instagram account, stating:

As artists, we are exposed to public opinion, and to the individual interpretations of people who like us and people who differ with what we do. I feel a lot of frustration for the misinformation that has been given, about the false posts that I have supposedly made and deleted from twitter, an account that I have not used for more than six months. In this case, unfortunately, the lyrics of a song, with which I sought to celebrate the union between artists and put to shine my people ... were taken out of context. None of the things said in the song have the direction they have been given, nor was it said from that perspective but I listen, I take responsibility and I realize that I still have a lot to learn. I feel very affected and I apologize from the bottom of my heart.

Billboard magazine commented on her apology, stating: "It's worth noting that Karol doesn't sing the line about the "14 year old," but rather some of the men on the track, yet she's the one apologizing."

Following the backlash, on November 13, the lyric was changed, now saying "Mamacita desde los eighteen".

The song received further national attention when a petition signed by several citizens, organizations, and congressional representatives requesting for the song to be removed from digital platforms due to the said lyrics was presented to the Congress of Colombia. The song, which senators claimed glorified pedophilia, was discussed in relation to a failed bill demanding "decent lyrics."

== Music video ==
The music video was released alongside the single on November 7, 2024. It shows all the singers in the studio recording the song.

== Charts ==
Chart performance for "+57"
Chart (2024)	Peak position
Argentina Hot 100 (Billboard)	62
Bolivia (Billboard)	8
Chile (Billboard)	9
Colombia (Billboard)	1
Ecuador (Billboard)	1
Global 200 (Billboard)	20
Peru (Billboard)	8
Portugal (AFP)	151
Spain (Promusicae)	4
Switzerland (Schweizer Hitparade)	82
Turkey International Airplay (Radiomonitor Türkiye)	3
US Billboard Hot 100	62
US Hot Latin Songs (Billboard)	4
US Hot Latin Rhythm Songs (Billboard)	18

== Certifications ==
Certifications for "+57"
Region	Certification	Certified units/sales
Brazil (Pro-Música Brasil)	Gold	20,000^{‡}
Spain (Promusicae)	Platinum	100,000^{‡}
^{‡} Sales+streaming figures based on certification alone.
