= Ay! San Miguel =

2025 song by Romeo Santos and Prince Royce

Single by Romeo Santos and Prince Royce

from the album Better Late Than Never
- Released: 5 June 2026
- Genre: Latin pop; bachata; tropical
- Length: 3:59
- Label: Sony Music Latin
- Songwriters: Anthony Santos; Alexander Caba; Jeffrey Nortey; Inassiah Emilio Parker; Carlos B. Mercader
- Producers: Romeo Santos; Inassiah Emilio Parker

Romeo Santos and Prince Royce singles chronology
"Dardos" (2026)	"Ay! San Miguel" (2026)	"Menor" (2026)

Music video
- "Ay! San Miguel" on YouTube

"Ay! San Miguel" (lit. 'Oh! Saint Michael') is a song recorded by American singers Romeo Santos and Prince Royce. It was written by Santos alongside four other songwriters, including Inassiah Emilio Parker, with production handled by Santos and Parker. The song was released by Sony Music Latin on November 28, 2025, as the eighth track from their collaborative studio album, Better Late Than Never (2025). Santos's former bandmate from Aventura, Max Santos, is featured as the Bassist. The music video for was officially released on June 5, 2026. It featured Dominican Merengue Típico musician Fefita la Grande.

== Charts ==
Chart performance for "Ay! San Miguel"
Chart (2025–2026)	Peak position
Dominican Republic Airplay (Monitor Latino)	2
US Hot Latin Songs (Billboard)	20
US Latin Airplay (Billboard)	1
US Hot Tropical Songs (Billboard)	8
US Tropical Airplay (Billboard)	1

== Certifications ==
Certifications and sales for "Ay! San Miguel"
Region	Certification	Certified units/sales
United States (RIAA)	2× Platinum (Latin)	120,000^{‡}
^{‡} Sales+streaming figures based on certification alone.
