= Latina Foreva =

2025 single by Karol G

Single by Karol G

from the album Tropicoqueta
- Language: Spanish
- Released: May 22, 2025
- Genre: Reggaeton
- Length: 2:39
- Label: Bichota; Interscope
- Songwriters: Carolina Giraldo Navarro; Misha Pihlakka; Daniela Aponte; Alvaro Jose Arroyo Gonzalez; Eliel Lind; Leonardo Vasquez; Natalie Albino; Nicole Albino; Ramón Ayala; Victor Santiago; Edwin Almonte; Ralphy Ramirez; Hector Mazzarri
- Producers: Mazzarri; Misha

Karol G singles chronology
"+57" (2024)	"Latina Foreva" (2025)	"Papasito" (2025)

Music video
- "Latina Foreva" on YouTube

"Latina Foreva" is a song by Colombian singer-songwriter Karol G. It was released on May 22, 2025, through Bichota Records and Interscope, as the second single from her fifth studio album, Tropicoqueta (2025).

== Background ==
Karol G announced the release of "Latina Foreva" through her social media platforms on May 21, 2025, sharing its cover art and labeling it as a "new era". It was released the following day on May 22, 2025.

== Composition ==
"Latina Foreva" was written by Giraldo alongside La Guru, Misha and Mazzarri and produced by the latter two, with Eliel Lind and Alvaro Arroyo receiving credits for its sample of "Dile" by Don Omar and N.O.R.E., Natalie and Nicole Albino, Gemstar, Daddy Yankee, Big Mato and Leonardo Vasquez receiving credits for its interpolation of "Oye Mi Canto". The outro samples a viral video of actress Alexa Demie.

"Latina Foreva" incorporates elements of early 2000s reggaeton with pop melodies.

In an interview with Rolling Stone, Karol G described the song about "all the aspects of being Latina", further stating: "Our curves, the way we're the life of the party, and how everyone in the world wants to be with a Latina. I feel like the energy we carry has just been contagious."

== Commercial performance ==
On the US Billboard Hot 100 chart dated June 7, 2025, the song debuted and peaked at number 74. On the chart dated July 5, 2025, following the release of Tropicoqueta, the song reached a new peak of number 66.

On the US Billboard Hot Latin Songs chart dated June 7, 2025, the song debuted and peaked at number 3.

On the Billboard Global 200 the song debuted at number 55 on the chart dated June 7, 2025.

== Awards and nominations ==
Awards and nominations for "Latina Foreva"
Year	Ceremony	Category	Result	Ref.
2025	Premios Juventud	Best Pop/Urban Song	Nominated	
2025	Los 40 Music Awards	Best Music Video	Nominated	
2026	American Music Awards	Favorite Latin Song	Nominated	
2026	Premio Lo Nuestro	Song of the Year	Nominated	
2026	Premio Lo Nuestro	Urban Song of the Year	Won	
2026	Premios Tu Música Urbano	Song of the Year	Nominated	

== Music video ==
The music video was directed by Pedro Artola and was released on Karol G's YouTube channel on May 22, 2025.

Filmed in Mammoth Lakes, California, it shows Karol G and an all-Latina crew dressed in glittering bikinis and glimmering stilettos in the snow. They are seen dancing, skiing, snowboarding, and riding snowmobiles in the peaks of Sierra Nevada, and spending time at a ski resort's jacuzzi. Karol G wears an emerald green, sequin-trimmed bikini that was made by Mexican fashion designer Mitzy and originally worn by Mexican vedette Rossy Mendoza. The music video also features a cameo from flamenco guitarist Jose Del Tomate.

When talking about the video, Giraldo described the video as a "sarcastic take about how hot us Latinas are." She added, "For Latinas, it's really important that we're always 'on point' with our outfits. I wanted that idea to be reflected visually, but the reality is we were freezing to death."

== Live performances ==
On September 5, 2025, Karol G headlined the half time show for the season opener for the NFL in São Paulo, where the song was performed for the first time. She performed the song on October 5, 2025, at the Victoria's Secret Fashion Show. Giraldo performed the song on January 25, 2026, as a guest on the Debí Tirar Más Fotos World Tour. "Latina Foreva" was performed at the 2026 Coachella Valley Music and Arts Festival on April 12 and 19. From July 24, 2026, through June 24, 2027, Karol G is set to embark on the stadium Viajando Por El Mundo Tropitour, where the song is present throughout the set list.

== Charts ==
=== Weekly charts ===
Weekly chart performance for "Latina Foreva"
Chart (2025)	Peak position
Argentina Hot 100 (Billboard)	45
Argentina (Monitor Latino)	1
Bolivia (Monitor Latino)	2
Central America (Monitor Latino)	1
Central America + Caribbean (FONOTICA)	1
Chile (Billboard)	21
Chile (Monitor Latino)	1
Colombia (Colombia Hot 100)	30
Costa Rica (FONOTICA)	6
Costa Rica (Monitor Latino)	3
Dominican Republic (Monitor Latino)	4
Ecuador (Billboard)	18
Ecuador (Monitor Latino)	1
El Salvador (ASAP EGC)	1
El Salvador (Monitor Latino)	1
Global 200 (Billboard)	55
Guatemala Airplay (Monitor Latino)	1
Honduras Airplay (Monitor Latino)	1
Italy Airplay (EarOne)	42
Latin America Airplay (Monitor Latino)	1
Nicaragua Airplay (Monitor Latino)	1
Panama (PRODUCE)	1
Panama Airplay (Monitor Latino)	1
Paraguay Airplay (Monitor Latino)	1
Peru (Billboard)	15
Peru (Monitor Latino)	1
Portugal (AFP)	187
San Marino Airplay (SMRTV Top 50)	47
Spain (PROMUSICAE)	13
Suriname (Nationale Top 40)	23
Switzerland (Schweizer Hitparade)	79
Uruguay (Monitor Latino)	1
US Billboard Hot 100	66
US Hot Latin Rhythm Songs (Billboard)	2
US Hot Latin Songs (Billboard)	3
US Latin Airplay (Billboard)	1
US Latin Rhythm Airplay (Billboard)	1
Venezuela (Monitor Latino)	10
Venezuela (Record Report)	20

=== Monthly charts ===
Monthly chart performance for "Latina Foreva"
Chart (2025)	Peak position
Paraguay Airplay (SGP)	2

=== Year-end charts ===
Chart (2025)	Position
Argentina Airplay (Monitor Latino)	30
Bolivia Airplay (Monitor Latino)	21
Central America Airplay (Monitor Latino)	13
Chile Airplay (Monitor Latino)	10
Colombia Airplay (Monitor Latino)	90
Costa Rica Airplay (Monitor Latino)	58
Dominican Republic Airplay (Monitor Latino)	85
Ecuador Airplay (Monitor Latino)	16
El Salvador Airplay (Monitor Latino)	7
Guatemala Airplay (Monitor Latino)	32
Honduras Airplay (Monitor Latino)	15
Nicaragua Airplay (Monitor Latino)	17
Panama Airplay (Monitor Latino)	14
Paraguay Airplay (Monitor Latino)	8
Peru Airplay (Monitor Latino)	21
Uruguay Airplay (Monitor Latino)	10
Venezuela Airplay (Monitor Latino)	32
US Hot Latin Songs (Billboard)	33

== Certifications ==
Certifications for "Latina Foreva"
Region	Certification	Certified units/sales
Brazil (Pro-Música Brasil)	Gold	20,000^{‡}
Spain (Promusicae)	Platinum	100,000^{‡}
^{‡} Sales+streaming figures based on certification alone.
