= Verano Rosa =

2025 song by Karol G and Feid

Song by Karol G and Feid

from the album Tropicoqueta
- Released: June 20, 2025
- Recorded: 2023–2024
- Genre: Reggaeton
- Length: 3:30
- Label: Bichota; Interscope
- Songwriters: Carolina Giraldo Navarro; Salomón Villada; Alejandro Ramírez; Nicolás Jaña
- Producers: Sky Rompiendo; Taiko

Official visualizer
- "Verano Rosa" on YouTube

"Verano Rosa" (Summer Rose) is a song by Colombian singers Karol G and Feid from the former's fifth studio album, Tropicoqueta (2025). It was produced by Sky Rompiendo and Taiko. At the 27th Annual Latin Grammy Awards the song won for Best Reggaeton Performance.

== Background ==
Karol G first revealed the song's existence in an interview with Rolling Stone in August 2023, explaining "It's a song about heartbreak, which is the best part of it all." She originally planned for the song to be featured on her mixtape Mañana Será Bonito (Bichota Season), but it was not finished at the time because she was looking for an ideal collaborator. Feid asked to collaborate with her. Although they had not kept in touch for a long time, Karol G invited him to open her Bichota Tour in 2021 and collaborated with him on the song "Friki" later that year. The two confirmed their romantic relationship in 2023.

When teasing the tracklist for Tropicoqueta, Karol G left out the title of "Verano Rosa" and only announced it as the album's 13th track.

== Charts ==
Chart performance for "Verano Rosa"
Chart (2025)	Peak position
Argentina (Monitor Latino)	1
Central America + Caribbean (FONOTICA)	9
Central America (Monitor Latino)	1
Chile (Billboard)	14
Chile (Monitor Latino)	7
Colombia (Monitor Latino)	1
Costa Rica (FONOTICA)	6
Costa Rica (Monitor Latino)	5
Ecuador (Billboard)	9
Ecuador (Monitor Latino)	4
El Salvador (ASAP EGC)	1
El Salvador (Monitor Latino)	1
Global 200 (Billboard)	64
Guatemala (Monitor Latino)	1
Honduras (Monitor Latino)	1
Latin America (Monitor Latino)	2
Nicaragua (Monitor Latino)	1
Panama (Monitor Latino)	1
Panama (PRODUCE)	2
Peru (Billboard)	10
Peru (Monitor Latino)	1
Spain (PROMUSICAE)	11
Uruguay Airplay (Monitor Latino)	12
US Billboard Hot 100	96
US Hot Latin Rhythm Songs (Billboard)	4
US Hot Latin Songs (Billboard)	9
US Latin Rhythm Airplay (Billboard)	24
Venezuela (Record Report)	23
Venezuela (Monitor Latino)	16

== Certifications ==
Certifications for "Verano Rosa"
Region	Certification	Certified units/sales
Brazil (Pro-Música Brasil)	Gold	20,000^{‡}
Spain (Promusicae)	Platinum	100,000^{‡}
^{‡} Sales+streaming figures based on certification alone.
