= Duki discography =

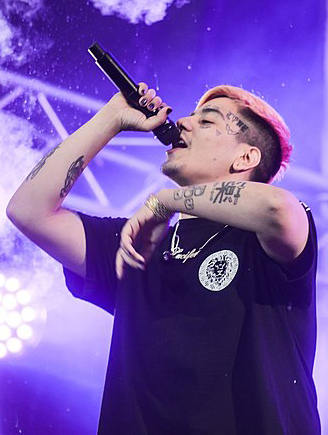
- Studio albums: 4
- EPs: 3
- Live albums: 1
- Singles: 86
- Promotional singles: 14

The discography of Argentine rapper Duki consists of four studio albums, one live albums, three extended plays and more than eighty singles (singles as featured artist and promotional singles). He has gained popularity with his singles "She Don't Give a Fo", "Loca" and "Goteo", the latter reached the top 10 on the Billboard Argentina Hot 100. In November 2019, Duki released his debut studio album, Súper Sangre Joven. In February 2019, Duki appeared as featured artist on Bad Bunny's album track "Hablamos Mañana" from the Puerto Rican singer's second studio album YHLQMDLG.

On 22 April 2021, Duki released his second studio album Desde el Fin del Mundo, the album ranked number 1 in digital albums chart in Argentina and number 11 in the Spanish albums chart.

== Albums ==
=== Studio albums ===
List of studio albums, with selected chart positions
Title	Album details	Peaks	Certifications
Title	Album details	SPA	Certifications
Súper Sangre Joven	Released: 1 November 2019; Label: SSJ, Dale Play; Formats: Digital download, streaming	12	CAPIF: Platinum
Desde el Fin del Mundo	Released: 22 April 2021; Label: SSJ, Dale Play; Formats: Digital download, streaming	11	CAPIF: Platinum
Antes de Ameri	Released: 22 June 2023; Label: Dale Play, SSJ; Formats: Digital download, streaming	2	PROMUSICAE: Gold
Ameri	Released: 31 October 2024; Label: Dale Play, SSJ; Formats: LP, digital download, streaming	1	
A Veces Solo Me Diverto	Released: 5 November 2026; Label: Dale Play, SSJ; Formats: LP, digital download, streaming	40	
* PROMUSICAE: Gold

=== Live albums ===
List of live albums with selected details
Title	Details
Vivo Desde el Fin del Mundo	Released: 10 June 2021; Label: SSJ, Dale Play; Format: Digital download, streaming

== Extended plays ==
List of extended plays with selected details
Title	Album details	Peaks	Certifications
Title	Album details	SPA	Certifications
24	Released: 24 June 2020; Label: SSJ, Dale Play; Formats: Digital download, streaming	—	
Temporada de Reggaetón	Released: 25 November 2021; Label: Dale Play, SSJ; Format: Digital download, streaming	20	PROMUSICAE: Gold
Temporada de Reggaetón 2	Released: 23 June 2022; Label: Dale Play, SSJ; Format: Digital download, streaming	3	PROMUSICAE: Gold
"—" denotes a recording that did not chart or was not released in that territory.

== Mixtapes ==
List of mixtapes with selected details
Title	Details	Peaks
Title	Details	SPA
5202	Released: 7 July 2025; Label: Dale Play, SSJ; Format: Digital download, streaming	15

== Singles ==
=== As lead artist ===
List of singles as lead artist, with selected chart positions, showing year released, certifications and album name
Title	Year	Peak chart positions									Certifications	Album
Title	Year	ARG	BOL	CHL	ECU	PAR	PER	SPA	URU	US Latin	Certifications	Album
"Ready for the Night" (with NahueMC and 808god)	2017	—	—	—	—	—	—	—	—	—		Non-album singles
"Mil Colores"	2017	—	—	—	—	—	—	—	—	—		Non-album singles
"Y Si Te Vas" (with Iacho)	2017	—	—	—	—	—	—	—	—	—		Non-album singles
"Hello Cotto"	2017	—	—	—	—	119	—	—	—	—	AMPROFON: Platinum; PROMUSICAE: Platinum	Non-album singles
"She Don't Give a Fo" (featuring Khea)	2017	7	—	—	—	57	—	31	—	—	AMPROFON: Diamond; PROMUSICAE: 6× Platinum	Non-album singles
"Rockstar"	2017	—	—	—	—	190	—	—	—	—	AMPROFON: 2× Platinum; PROMUSICAE: Platinum	Non-album singles
"Si Te Sentís Sola"	2018	9	—	—	—	—	—	—	—	—	PROMUSICAE: Gold	Non-album singles
"Quavo #Mododiablo" (with Ysy A and Neo Pistea)	2018	—	—	—	—	—	—	—	—	—		Non-album singles
"Guapo" (with Ysy A, C.R.O, Kaktov and Neo Pistea)	2018	—	—	—	—	—	—	—	—	—		Non-album singles
"Hijo de la Noche" (with Ysy A and C.R.O)	2018	9	—	—	—	—	—	—	—	—	PROMUSICAE: Gold	Non-album singles
"No Me Llores" (with Leby)	2018	44	—	—	—	—	—	—	—	—	AMPROFON: Platinum; PROMUSICAE: Gold	Non-album singles
"Sin Culpa" (featuring DrefQuila)	2018	6	—	—	—	—	—	—	—	—	PROMUSICAE: Gold	Non-album singles
"Lebron"	2019	69	—	—	—	—	—	—	—	—		Non-album singles
"Trap N' Export" (with Ysy A and Neo Pistea)	2019	—	—	—	—	—	—	—	—	—		Non-album singles
"Rally" (with H Roto and GARZI)	2019	—	—	—	—	—	—	—	—	—		Non-album singles
"Hitboy" (with Khea)	2019	22	—	—	—	—	—	—	—	—	AMPROFON: Platinum	Súper Sangre Joven
"Entre Cuatro Paredes" (featuring Vicentico and La Bomba de Tiempo)	2019	64	—	—	—	—	—	—	—	—		El Marginal 3
"Goteo"	2019	10	—	—	—	200	—	5	—	—	AMPROFON: 3× Platinum+Gold; PROMUSICAE: 3× Platinum	Súper Sangre Joven
"A Punta de Espada" (with Ysy A)	2019	93	—	—	—	—	—	—	—	—		Súper Sangre Joven
"Te Traje Flores"	2019	82	—	—	—	—	—	—	—	—		Súper Sangre Joven
"H.I.E.L.O." (with Obie Wanshot)	2020	81	—	—	—	—	—	—	—	—		Non-album singles
"Fornai" (featuring Orodembow)	2020	94	—	—	—	—	—	—	—	—		Non-album singles
"Café" (with Fuego featuring LUYO)	2020	—	—	—	—	—	—	—	—	—		Non-album singles
"Acapella"	2020	—	—	—	—	—	—	—	—	—		Non-album singles
"Eo Eo" (with Bles featuring DellaFlame)	2020	—	—	—	—	—	—	—	—	—		Non-album singles
"Por Mi Nombre" (featuring Club Hats)	2020	—	—	—	—	—	—	—	—	—		Non-album singles
"Sold Out Dates"	2020	53	—	—	—	—	—	—	—	—		Non-album singles
"Muero de Fiesta Este Finde" (with Ca7riel)	2021	—	—	—	—	—	—	—	—	—		Desde el Fin del Mundo
"Además de Mí" (remix) (with Rusherking and Khea featuring Tiago PZK, Lit Killah and María Becerra)	2021	1	—	—	—	44	—	42	—	—	CAPIF: 3× Platinum; PROMUSICAE: Gold	Non-album single
"Chico Estrella"	2021	21	—	—	—	—	—	—	—	—		Desde el Fin del Mundo
"Wacha" (with Khea)	2021	3	—	—	—	—	—	52	17	—		Non-album single
"Panamá" (with Trueno)	2021	16	—	—	—	—	—	43	—	—	CAPIF: Gold; CUD: Gold; PROMUSICAE: Gold	Non-album single
"No Me Conocen" (remix) (with Bandido and Rei featuring Tiago PZK)	2021	1	—	—	—	35	—	75	3	—	CAPIF: Platinum; PROMUSICAE: Platinum	Non-album single
"2:50" (remix) (with Mya and Tini)	2021	3	—	—	—	17	—	41	9	—	CAPIF: 2× Platinum; CUD: 2× Platinum; PROMUSICAE: Platinum	Suena MYA!
"Bailando Te Conocí" (with Rusherking)	2021	11	—	—	—	—	—	—	—	—		Non-album single
"Como Si No Importara" (with Emilia)	2021	3	—	26	—	18	—	88	17	—	CAPIF: 4× Platinum; AMPROFON: Gold; CUD: 3× Platinum; IFPI CHL: Gold; PROMUSICAE: Platinum; RIAA: Gold (Latin)	Tú Crees en Mí?
"YaMeFui" (with Bizarrap and Nicki Nicole)	2021	8	—	—	—	51	—	19	5	—	AMPROFON: Gold; PROMUSICAE: Platinum	Non-album single
"Ley de Atracción"	2021	28	—	—	—	—	—	67	—	—	CAPIF: Gold; PROMUSICAE: Gold	Temporada de Reggaetón
"Unfollow" (with Justin Quiles and Bizarrap)	2021	19	—	—	—	—	—	17	—	—	CAPIF: Gold; PROMUSICAE: Platinum	Temporada de Reggaetón
"Una Vaina Loca" (with Fuego and Manuel Turizo)	2021	13	—	—	—	62	—	5	14	—	PROMUSICAE: 2× Platinum; RIAA: Platinum (Latin)	Non-album single
"Mala Mía" (with Lit Killah)	2021	25	—	—	—	183	—	—	—	—		MAWZ
"Midtown"	2021	51	—	—	—	—	—	—	—	—		Temporada de Reggaetón
"Top 5"	2021	8	—	—	—	53	—	19	15	—	PROMUSICAE: Platinum	Temporada de Reggaetón
"Esto Recién Empieza" (with Emilia)	2022	9	—	—	—	—	—	—	11	—	PROMUSICAE: Gold	Temporada de Reggaetón 2
"Si Quieren Frontear" (with De la Ghetto and Quevedo)	2022	6	21	—	—	14	—	4	2	—	AMPROFON: Gold; PROMUSICAE: 2× Platinum	Temporada de Reggaetón 2
"Antes de Perderte"	2022	11	—	—	—	45	—	25	10	—	AMPROFON: Platinum; PROMUSICAE: 2× Platinum	Temporada de Reggaetón 2
"Celosa"	2022	51	—	—	—	102	—	35	—	—	PROMUSICAE: Gold	Temporada de Reggaetón 2
"Givenchy"	2022	2	7	13	17	7	15	7	16	—	AMPROFON: Platinum; PROMUSICAE: 2× Platinum	Temporada de Reggaetón 2
"Duki: Bzrp Music Sessions, Vol. 50" (with Bizarrap)	2022	1	—	—	—	—	—	1	—	—	AMPROFON: Gold; PROMUSICAE: 2× Platinum	Non-album single
"Si Me Sobrara el Tiempo"	2023	22	—	—	—	—	—	31	—	—	PROMUSICAE: Gold	Non-album single
"Harakiri" (with C.R.O)	2023	22	—	—	—	—	—	—	—	—	AMPROFON: Gold	Antes de Ameri
"Apollo 13"	2023	32	—	—	—	—	—	69	—	—		Antes de Ameri
"Los del Espacio" (among Los del Espacio)	2023	1	5	2	22	2	6	3	1	—	CAPIF: 2× Platinum; PROMUSICAE: 6× Platinum	Non-album single
"Rockstar 2.0" (with Jhayco)	2023	16	—	—	—	—	—	26	—	—	PROMUSICAE: Gold	Antes de Ameri
"Remember Me" (with Khea and Bizarrap)	2023	22	—	—	—	—	—	49	—	—		Antes de Ameri
"No Son Klle" (with Santa Fe Klan and Peso Pluma)	2024	—	—	—	—	—	—	—	—	40		Non-album single
"Barro"	2024	19	—	—	—	—	—	58	—			Ameri
"Constelación" (with Lia Kali)	2024	25	—	—	—	—	—	21	—	—		Ameri
"Wake Up & Bake Up" (with Wiz Khalifa and Arcángel)	2024	38	—	—	—	—	—	86	—	—		Ameri
"Nueva Era" (with Myke Towers)	2024	2	9	23	16	—	20	5	—	—	PROMUSICAE: Platinum	Ameri
"Plástico" (with Lali)	2025	25	—	—	—	—	— (Note: "Plástico" did not enter the Billboard Peru Songs chart, but peaked at number 16 on the Monitor Latino Peru Pop Airplay chart.)	—	—	—	CAPIF: Gold	No Vayas a Atender Cuando el Demonio Llama
"Golfista"	2025	—	—	—	—	—	—	—	—	—		TBA
"—" denotes a recording that did not chart or was not released in that territory.

=== As a featured artist ===
List of singles as featured artist, with selected chart positions, showing year released, certifications and album name
Title	Year	Peak chart positions					Certifications	Album
Title	Year	ARG	ITA	NIC	SPA	US Latin	Certifications	Album
"Txdx Violeta" (Klave with Duki)	2017	—	—	—	—	—		Non-album singles
"Resaca" (Ysy A and Scxlvry with Duki)	2017	—	—	—	—	—		Non-album singles
"B.U.H.O" (Midel, Khea and Arse featuring Duki and Klave)	2017	—	—	—	—	—		Non-album singles
"Loca" (Khea featuring Duki and Cazzu)	2017	3	—	9	—	—	PROMUSICAE: Platinum; RIAA: Gold (Latin)	Ave María
"Lunes No Va Bien" NahueMC featuring Duki and Le'eFFe)	2017	—	—	—	—	—		Non-album single
"Loca" (remix) (Khea featuring Bad Bunny, Duki and Cazzu)	2018	—	—	—	65	45	PROMUSICAE: Gold; RIAA: Gold (Latin)	Ave María
"Uh" (as part of Modo Diablo)	2018	—	—	—	—	—		Non-album singles
"Mojaa" (Bhavi with Duki)	2018	—	—	—	—	—		Non-album singles
"Sigo Fresh" (Fuego)	2019	83	—	—	—	—	RIAA: Gold (Latin)	You're Welcome
"Verano Hater" (Dante Spinetta with Duki)	2019	93	—	—	—	—		Non-album singles
"I.D.K." (Zanto with Duki)	2019	—	—	—	—	—		Non-album singles
"Tumbando el Club" (remix) (Neo Pistea featuring C.R.O, Obiewanshot, Ysy A, Cazzu, Khea, Lucho SSJ, Coqeéin Montana, Marcianos Crew and Duki)	2019	3	—	—	—	—	CAPIF: Platinum; AMPROFON: Gold; PROMUSICAE: Gold	Non-album singles
"Vuelta a La Luna" (remix) (Ysy A featuring Duki and Neo Pistea)	2019	74	—	—	—	—		Antezana 247
"Trapperz A Mafia Da Sicilia" (Felp 22 and Rauw Alejandro with Duki featuring MC Davo and Fuego)	2019	74	—	—	—	—		Non-album singles
"Tengo 30" (Khea featuring Duki, Cazzu, Neo Pistea and Tali Goya)	2019	45	—	—	—	—		Non-album singles
"Ánimo" (Khea featuring Duki and Midel)	2019	83	—	—	—	—		Non-album singles
"Cereza" (Fuego with Duki)	2019	—	—	—	—	—		Non-album singles
"5 Stars" (C. Tangana with Duki and Neo Pistea featuring Polima Westcoast)	2019	—	—	—	67	—		Non-album singles
"Like Boss" (remix) (Frijo and Bizarrap featuring Duki, Akapellah, Moonkey, Polima Westcoast, Santoz and Zanto)	2019	92	—	—	—	—		Non-album singles
"Miami" (Ronny J featuring Sfera Ebbasta and Duki)	2020	—	83	—	—	—		Non-album singles
"Jimmy Fallon" (remix) (Lucho SSJ featuring C.R.O, Duki and Khea)	2020	—	—	—	—	—		Non-album singles
"Pininfarina" (remix) (Rei and Neo Pistea with Duki)	2020	33	—	—	—	—	CAPIF: Platinum; AMPROFON: Platinum	Non-album singles
"Run Run Stop" (Polima Westcoast with Duki)	2020	—	—	—	—	—		Non-album singles
"Angelito" (ObieWanshot featuring Duki)	2020	—	—	—	—	—		Hibrido
"Hablamos Poco, Hacemos Mucho" (Seven Kayne with Duki)	2020	—	—	—	—	—		Non-album singles
"Gelato" (Eladio Carrion and Smokepurpp with Duki featuring Hide Miyabi)	2020	—	—	—	—	—		Non-album singles
"Perdiendo el Tiempo" (Marcianos Crew and Homer El Mero Mero with Duki)	2020	—	—	—	—	—		Non-album singles
"Louis Vuitton" (44KID and Mesita with Duki)	2020	—	—	—	—	—		Non-album singles
"Aguacero" (Tali Goya featuring Duki)	2021	—	—	—	—	—		Non-album singles
"Sexy" (Eich featuring Khea and Duki)	2021	—	—	—	—	—		Non-album singles
"Trappist-1" (Neo Pistea featuring Duki)	2021	—	—	—	—	—		Non-album singles
"Otra Vez" (Pekeño 77 with Duki)	2021	—	—	—	—	—		Non-album singles
"Lambo" (remix) (C.R.O and Chucky73 with Duki featuring West Dubai, Moonkey and Nake)	2021	66	—	—	—	—		Non-album singles
"Me Enseñaste" (remix) (Sael with Duki)	2021	—	—	—	—	—		Non-album singles
"Día de Pago" (Ovi featuring Duki)	2021	—	—	—	—	—		Non-album singles
"Carita Morena" (Omar Montes with Duki)	2021	—	—	—	87	—		Non-album singles
"Paris" (Morat with Duki)	2021	18	—	—	—	—	AMPROFON: Gold; PROMUSICAE: Platinum; RIAA: Gold (Latin)	Non-album singles
"Pantera" (with Rvfv)	2022	—	—	—	13	—	PROMUSICAE: Platinum	Non-album singles
"Party en el Barrio" (with Paulo Londra)	2022	8	—	—	30	—		Back to the Game
"Marisola" (remix) (Cris MJ, Duki and Nicki Nicole featuring Standly and Stars Music Chile)	2022	1	—	—	20	—		Non-album singles
"Nena Sad" (remix) (Oro600, Pablo Chili-E, Duki and Quevedo featuring Orodembow and 0-600)	2025	—	—	—	20	—		
"—" denotes a recording that did not chart or was not released in that territory.

== Promotional singles ==
List of promotional singles showing year released and peak chart positions
Title	Year	Peaks		Certifications	Album
Title	Year	ARG	SPA	Certifications	Album
"Fuck Luv" (with C.R.O)	2018	—	—		Non-album promotional single
"Alas" (with C.R.O)	2018	—	—		542
"Vampiros" (with C.R.O)	2018	—	—		Non-album promotional singles
"Ferrari" (with DICC)	2018	—	—		Non-album promotional singles
"Mi Chain de Roque"	2018	—	—		Non-album promotional singles
"Ballin'"	2019	—	—		Non-album promotional singles
"Makina de Armado" (featuring Khea and Neo Pistea)	2019	—	—		Non-album promotional singles
"Sol y Luna"	2019	—	—		Non-album promotional singles
"Mericrisma"	2019	—	—		Non-album promotional singles
"Perrea" (with Negro Dub, West Dubai and Frijo)	2020	—	—		Non-album promotional singles
"Como Si Na"	2020	—	—		Non-album promotional singles
"Nota Espacial" (with Club Hats)	2020	—	—		Non-album promotional singles
"Aleluya" (remix) (with Rels B and Alemán)	2020	—	—	AMPROFON: Platinum	Non-album promotional singles
"En Movimiento"	2021	—	—		Temporada de Reggaetón
"Troya"	2023	42	—		Antes de Ameri
"Call Me Maybe"	2023	41	67		Non-album promotional singles
"Ta Te Ti"	2024	—	—		Non-album promotional singles
"—" denotes a recording that did not chart or was not released in that territory.

== Other charted songs ==
Title	Year	Peak Chart Positions				Certifications	Album
Title	Year	ARG	PAR	SPA	US Latin	Certifications	Album
"Otro cheke" (with Rels B featuring the Rudeboyz)	2019	—	—	41	—		Happy Birthday Flakko
"Hablamos Mañana" (with Bad Bunny and Pablo Chill-E)	2020	37	—	40	22	PROMUSICAE: Platinum	YHLQMDLG
"Malbec" (featuring Bizarrap)	2021	17	56	27	—	AMPROFON: Gold; PROMUSICAE: 3× Platinum	Desde el Fin del Mundo
"Pintao" (featuring Ysy A and Rei)	2021	48	—	—	—	AMPROFON: Gold; PROMUSICAE: Gold	Desde el Fin del Mundo
"Cascada"	2021	79	—	—	—		Desde el Fin del Mundo
"Yin Yan" (with Rels B)	2021	87	—	28	—	AMPROFON: Gold; PROMUSICAE: Gold	Temporada de Reggaetón
"Sin Frenos" (with Eladio Carrión and Bizarrap)	2021	—	—	52	—	AMPROFON: Gold; PROMUSICAE: 2× Platinum	Sauce Boyz 2
"Amor Bipolar" (with Mora)	2022	—	—	87	—		Temporada de Reggaetón 2
"Perreo Bendito"	2022	80	—	—	—		Temporada de Reggaetón 2
"01 de Enero" (with Lucho SSJ)	2023	43	—	—	—		Antes de Ameri
"Jefes del Sudoeste"	2023	44	—	—	—		Antes de Ameri
"Contra Mí" (with West Dubai)	2023	51	—	—	—		Antes de Ameri
"CSIpher (Audio Latino)" (with Akapellah, Nuevo Shorty and Micro TDH)	2023	62	—	—	—		Antes de Ameri
"Gigi"	2023	59	—	—	—		Antes de Ameri
"Don't Lie" (with Quevedo)	2023	33	—	48	—		Antes de Ameri
"Uno Dos" (with Salastkbron)	2023	40	—	—	—		Antes de Ameri
"N.C.L.C."	2023	71	—	—	—		Antes de Ameri
"Último Tren a Ameri"	2023	74	—	—	—		Antes de Ameri
"No Da Más" (Ysy A with Duki)	2023	35	—	—	—		El After del After
"Todo Lit" (Eladio Carrión with Duki)	2024	—	—	58	—		Sol María
"Leitmotiv"	2024	83	—	—	—		Ameri
"Brindis" (with Headie One)	2024	22	—	37	—		Ameri
"Buscarte Lejos" (with Bizarrap)	2024	17	—	24	—		Ameri
"Imperio" (with Judeline)	2024	21	—	15	—		Ameri
"Hardaway" (with YG and Eladio Carrión)	2024	27	—	46	—		Ameri
"Cine"	2024	20	—	56	—		Ameri
"Vida de Rock" (with Milo J)	2024	12	—	32	—		Ameri
"No Drama" (with Ovi and Lucho SSJ)	2024	37	—	75	—		Ameri
"Un Día Más" (with Ysy A)	2024	41	—	98	—		Ameri
"Trato de Estar Bien" (with Morad)	2024	61	—	36	—		Ameri
"Ameri"	2024	35	—	62	—		Ameri
"—" denotes a recording that did not chart or was not released in that territory.

== Other songs ==
List of other songs, with other performing artists, showing year released and album name
Title	Year	Other artist(s)	Album
"No Vendo Trap"	2016	—N/a	Non-album singles
"Astral" (remix)	2017	Paulo, Wolf, Sync	Non-album singles
"Hasta las 6"	2017	Kodigo, JNO, DrefQuila, SG	Non-album singles
"Lola"	2017	—N/a	Non-album singles
"Wanda Nara"	2017	Neo Pistea	Non-album singles
"Machika" (remix)	2018	J Balvin, G-Eazy, Sfera Ebbasta featuring Anitta, MC Fioti and Jeon	Non-album singles
"Vuelta a la Luna"	2018	Ysy A	Antezana 247
"No Se"	2018	Ysy A	Antezana 247
"La Clase"	2019	Cazzu featuring Neo Pistea and Ysy A	Error 93
"Otro Cheke"	2019	Rels B and the Rudeboyz	Happy Birthday Flakko
"Shorty"	2019	Nicki Nicole	Recuerdos
"Hablamos Mañana"	2020	Bad Bunny and Pablo Chill-E	YHLQMDLG
"Perdoname Si Llego Tarde"	2020	Lucho SSJ	Nivel
"Gelato 44"	2020	Khea featuring Saga WhiteBlack	Trapicheo
"En el Banco"	2020	Neutro Shorty, Neo Pistea	Humble Boyz
"Angelito"	2020	Obie Wanshot	Hibrido
"Tamo Real"	2021	Lucho SSJ ft. Pablo Chill-E	Baller
"Vai Sentando"	2023	Ludmilla and King Doudou featuring Skrillex	Fast X
"Plástico"	2025	Lali	No Vayas a Atender Cuando el Demonio Llama
