= Desde el Fin del Mundo =

2021 studio album by Duki

Studio album by Duki
- Released: 22 April 2021
- Recorded: 2020–2021
- Genre: Latin trap; pop rock
- Length: 57:12
- Label: SSJ; Dale Play
- Producer: Yesan; Asan; Marlku; Club Hats; Orodembow; Zecca; Evar; Bizarrap; Hide Miyabi; Rulits; Smash David

Duki chronology
Súper Sangre Joven (2019)	Desde el Fin del Mundo (2021)	Vivo Desde el Fin del Mundo (2021)

Singles from Desde el Fin del Mundo
- 1. "Muero de Fiesta" Released: 28 January 2021; 2. "Chico Estrella" Released: 15 March 2021

Desde el Fin del Mundo (transl. "From the End of the World") is the second studio album by Argentine rapper and singer Duki. It was released on 22 April 2021 through SSJ Records and Dale Play Records. Unlike their debut studio album Súper Sangre Joven, this album features 18 songs and features more guest producers and artists. The album features the participation of the artists Ysy A, Rei, Lucho SSJ, Farina, Lara91k, Asan, Bizarrap, Pablo Chill-E, Julianno Sosa, Young Cister, Neo Pistea, Obie Wanshot, Tobi, Khea, Pekeño 77, Mesita, Franux BB, 44 Kid and Ca7riel. The album was produced entirely by Yesan and Asan.

== Background and composition ==
Desde el Fin del Mundo began its recording in mid-2020 ending at the beginning of 2021. The lyrics of the songs on the album talk about the achievements obtained by Duki in his short career, Duki talks in his songs about how he became the boy who rapped in the "Qunto Escalón" to be the maximum exponent of trap in Argentina, some songs also speak of love, lack of love, partys and drugs.

== Promotion and singles ==
The promotion of Desde el Fin del Mundo began at the end of 2020, Duki via Instagram commented that he was not going to release songs until January 2021 to start the era of his second studio album, this came after he released an EP titled 24. Duki said the reason he didn't release songs until 2021 is so he can focus on recording the album.

On 28 January 2021 the first single "Muero de Fiesta este Finde" was released together with the Argentine singer Ca7riel, the song is the typical trap that Duki usually does combining rock sounds. The second single to be released was "Chico Estrella", the song was a trend in several countries and managed to reach #31 on the Billboard Argentina Hot 100 chart, the song talks about what Duki's life is like today, a rockstar life.

== Track listing ==
Desde el Fin del Mundo track listing
No.	Title	Writer(s)	Producer(s)	Length
1.	"Sudor y Trabajo"	Mauro Ezequiel Lombardo	Yesan; Asan	3:01
2.	"Pintao" (with YSY A and Rei)	Lombardo; Alejo Acosta Migliarini; Julián Reininger	Yesan; Asan; Marlku	2:48
3.	"Chico Estrella"	Lombardo; Federico Yesan Rojas; Tomás Santos Juan	Yesan; Asan	2:51
4.	"Volando Bajito"	Lombardo	Yesan; Asan; Club Hats	2:15
5.	"Cuanto" (with Lucho SSJ and Farina)	Lombardo; Luciano Nahuel Vega; Farina Pao Paucar Franco	Yesan; Asan; Orodembow	3:11
6.	"Rápido"	Lombardo	Yesan; Asan	2:16
7.	"I Don't Know"	Lombardo	Yesan; Asan; Zecca	3:39
8.	"Sol" (with Lara91k)	Lombardo; Lara Artesi	Yesan; Asan; Club Hats; Marlku	4:05
9.	"Luna" (with Asan)	Lombardo; Juan	Yesan; Asan; Evar	3:21
10.	"Malbec" (with Bizarrap)	Lombardo	Yesan; Asan; Bizarrap	2:56
11.	"Mi Diablo"	Lombardo	Yesan; Asan; Hide Miyabi	3:13
12.	"Fifty Fifty" (with Pablo Chill-E and Obie Wanshot featuring Neo Pistea, Julianno Sosa and Young Cister)	Lombardo; César Alejandro Pozo; Estebán Cisterna; Pablo Ignacio Acevedo Leiva; Sebastián Ezequiel Chinellato; Victor Germán Goimil	Yesan; Asan; Rulits	4:40
13.	"Valentino" (with Tobi)	Lombardo; Tobi Dolezor	Yesan; Asan	2:37
14.	"Cascada"	Lombardo	Yesan; Asan	3:13
15.	"Ticket"	Lombardo	Yesan; Asan; Smash David	3:09
16.	"Muriendome" (with KHEA)	Lombardo; Ivo Alfredo Thomás Serue	Yesan; Asan; Marlku	2:40
17.	"Ella Es Mi Bitch" (with Pekeño 77 and Mesita featuring Franux BB and 44 Kid)	Lombardo; Bruno Garrino; Facundo Cedres; Francisco Agustín Álvarez Costales; Santiago David Messano	Yesan; Asan	4:06
18.	"Muero de Fiesta Este Finde" (with Ca7riel)	Lombardo; Catriel Guerreiro; Rojas	Yesan	3:14
Total length:				57:12

== Personnel ==
Personnel adapted from Tidal.

Primary Artist

- Duki – lead vocals, songwriting

Additional musicians

- Ysy A – vocals (track 2)
- Rei – vocals (track 2)
- Lucho SSJ – vocals (track 5)
- Farina – vocals (track 5)
- Lara91k – vocals (track 8)
- Asan – vocals (track 9)
- Pablo Chill-E – vocals (track 12)
- Julianno Sosa – vocals (track 12)
- Young Cister – vocals (track 12)
- Neo Pistea – vocals (track 12)
- Obie Wanshot – vocals (track 12)
- Tobi – vocals (track 13)
- Khea – vocals (track 16)
- Pekeño 77 – vocals (track 17)
- Mesita – vocals (track 17)
- Franux BB – vocals (track 17)
- 44 Kid – vocals (track 17)
- Ca7riel – vocals (track 18)

Additional personnel

- Yesan – producer
- Asan – producer
- Marlku – producer (track 2, 8, 16)
- Club Hats – producer (track 4, 8)
- Orodembow – producer (track 5)
- Zecca – producer (track 7)
- Evar – producer (track 9)
- Bizarrap – producer (track 10)
- Hide Miyabi – producer (track 11)
- Rulits – producer (track 12)
- Smash David – producer (track 15)
- Nahuel Lombardo – executive producer
- Candela Lombardo – assistant producer
- Ivo Woscoboinik – assistant producer
- Joaquín Crededio – recording
- Ramiro Colomer – recording
- Martin Algieri – recording
- Juan Pablo Morando – mixing
- Jonathan Vainberg – mixing
- Ezequiel Kronenberg – mixing
- Brian Taylor – mixing
- Javier Fracchia – mastering
- Francisco Alduncin – drums (track 8, 16)
- Percii – guitar (track 8)
- Matias Lourenco – quena (track 10)
- Facundo Alama – coordinating producer
- Tito Leconte – coordinating producer

== Charts ==
Chart (2021)	Peak position
Spanish Albums (PROMUSICAE)	11

== Certifications ==
Region	Certification	Certified units/sales
Argentina (CAPIF)	Platinum	20,000^{^}
^{^} Shipments figures based on certification alone.

== Release history ==
Region	Date	Label	Format	Ref
Various	22 April 2021	SSJ; Dale Play	Digital download, streaming	
