= Error 93 =

2019 studio album by Cazzu

Studio album by Cazzu
- Released: 3 June 2019
- Genre: Latin trap; hip hop
- Length: 32:04
- Language: Spanish
- Label: Rimas
- Producer: YTBM; La Paciencia

Cazzu chronology
Maldades (2017)	Error 93 (2019)	Bonus Trap (2020)

Singles from Error 93
- 1. "Visto a las 00:00" Released: 3 June 2019; 2. "Mucha Data" Released: 12 August 2019; 3. "Nada" Released: 13 November 2019; 4. "Mentiste" Released: 2 December 2019

Error 93 is the second studio album by Argentine rapper and singer Cazzu. It was released by surprise on 3 June 2019 by Rimas Entertainment. Error 93 is a Latin trap, hip hop record. It was primarily produced by YTBM and also features production from La Paciencia. The album features guest appearances by Dalex, Lyanno, Rauw Alejandro and trap group Modo Diablo, comprised by Duki, Neo Pistea and Ysy A.

The album gained a nomination for Female Album of the Year at the 2020 Tu Música Urbano Awards.

== Background and composition ==
In Error 93, Cazzu opens up about love, deception, and independence. The singer wrote each one of the ten tracks on her own. According to Billboard's Jessica Roiz, "the album establishes her as a well-rounded urban act who can play with trap and hip-hop rhythms, as heard on "Mucha Data", and also drop fiery old-school reggaeton/perreo songs, as heard on "Rally" and "Al Reves"." The first single off of Error 93 was "Visto a las 00:00", a "sensual urban track about starting a relationship from scratch."

As regards the creative process, Cazzu said, "I sat down with my producer and we listened to lots of albums. One of the albums we most listened to was Halsey's Badlands. I love being able to fuse some of the sounds that she uses to create urban music. Jeremih is another artist whose flow and way of singing and composing music I try to incorporate. "I am simply trying to create what is essentially in my brain."

== Track listing ==
All tracks are produced by YTBM, and written by Julieta Cazzuchelli, except where noted.

Error 93 track listing
No.	Title	Writer(s)	Producer(s)	Length
1.	"Visto a las 00:00"			3:01
2.	"Mucha Data"			2:34
3.	"Rally"			2:45
4.	"Penas y Problemas"			3:16
5.	"Mentiste"			3:32
6.	"Al Revés"			2:21
7.	"Ya No Quiero"		La Paciencia	2:54
8.	"Fuego"			2:09
9.	"Nada" (with Rauw Alejandro and Lyanno featuring Dalex)	Julieta Cazzuchelli; Raúl Ocasio; Edgardo Cuevas; Pedro Daleccio; Yael Gonzalez		5:05
10.	"La Clase" (with Duki and Neo Pistea featuring Ysy A)	Cazzuchelli; Mauro Lombardo; Iejo Acosta; Sebastián Chillenato		4:27
Total length:				32:01

Notes

- "Visto a las 00" is sometimes credited as "00:00"

== Charts ==
Weekly chart performance for Error 93
Chart (2019)	Peak position
Spanish Albums (PROMUSICAE)	84
