= MAWZ =

2021 debut studio album by Lit Killah

Studio album by Lit Killah
- Released: August 19, 2021
- Recorded: 2020–2021
- Genres: Latin trap; hip hop; trapeton; R&B; alternative rock
- Length: 45:28
- Label: Warner Latina
- Producers: Big One; Oniria; XAXO

Singles from MAWZ
- 1. "Change" Released: February 18, 2021; 2. "California" Released: June 17, 2021; 3. "Déjame Tranki" Released: August 19, 2021; 4. "En la Oscuridad" Released: September 16, 2021; 5. "Ese Mensaje" Released: October 22, 2021; 6. "Mala Mía" Released: November 11, 2021

MAWZ is the debut studio album by Argentine rapper and singer Lit Killah. It was released on August 19, 2021, through Warner Music Latina. The album began its production at the end of 2020 and was in charge of the Argentine producers Big One and Oniria and some songs by XAXO. The album has the participation of Argentine artists such as Khea, María Becerra, Duki, FMK, Rusherking and Tiago PZK.

== Background ==
At the end of 2020 Lit Killah had announced that he will be releasing his first album with plans to be released in mid-2021. After the success of the song Flexin' with the Argentine producer Bizarrap, Lit Killah announced that the recordings of his album were about to begin, the first single would be released until 2021.

== Singles and promotion ==
The first single to be released was "Change" and it was released on February 18, 2021, in the song Lit he talks about everything he has achieved in his career from having very little to having almost everything, the song is dedicated to all people who met him doing freestyle. The song reached #64 on the Billboard Argentina Hot 100 chart. The second single to be released was "California" and it was released on June 17, 2021. In this song Lit Killah talks about glamour and jewels. The song reached #56 on the Billboard Argentina Hot 100 chart.

The third single to be released was "Déjame Tranki" featuring Argentine rapper and singer Khea, it was released on August 19, 2021, just hours after the album was released.

== Track listing ==
All tracks were written by Lit Killah.

MAWZ track listing
| No. | Title | Writer(s) | Producer(s) | Length |
|---|---|---|---|---|
| 1. | "Déjame Tranki" (with Khea) | Mauro Román Monzón; Ivo Alfredo Thomás Serue; Daniel Ismael Real | Big One | 3:42 |
| 2. | "California" | Monzón; Tomás Díaz | Oniria | 3:21 |
| 3. | "En la Oscuridad" (with María Becerra) | Monzón; María de los Ángeles Becerra; Enzo Sauthier; Real | Big One | 2:53 |
| 4. | "My Bag" | Monzón; Real | Big One | 3:30 |
| 5. | "Mala Mía" (with Duki) | Monzón; Mauro Ezequiel Lombardo; Real | Big One | 3:10 |
| 6. | "A Tus Pies" (with Rusherking) | Monzón; Tomás Tobar; Real | Big One | 3:31 |
| 7. | "No Hables Mal de Mi" | Monzón; Sauthier; Díaz | Oniria | 3:23 |
| 8. | "Ese Mensaje" (with FMK) | Monzón; Sauthier; Real | Big One | 2:33 |
| 9. | "Se Que No Te Gusta Estar So' (freestyle)" | Monzón; Díaz | Oniria | 3:18 |
| 10. | "Dame Una Nite" (with Tiago PZK) | Monzón; Tiago Uriel Pacheco Lezcano; Díaz | Oniria | 3:27 |
| 11. | "El Inversor" | Monzón; Díaz; Julca Brothers | XAXO; Oniria | 2:48 |
| 12. | "Hechizame" | Monzón; Díaz | Oniria | 3:09 |
| 13. | "Change" | Monzón; Real | Big One | 3:19 |
| 14. | "Soy Uno Más" | Monzón; Díaz | Oniria | 3:17 |
| Total length: | | | | 45:28 |

== Personnel ==
Credits for MAWZ adapted from Genius.

Primary musicians
- Lit Killah – Primary artist, vocals
- Khea – featured vocals
- María Becerra – featured vocals
- Duki – featured vocals
- Rusherking – featured vocals
- FMK – featured vocals, songwriter
- Tiago PZK – featured vocals

Additional musicians

- El SideChain – bass guitar
- Germán Vidal Hahn – bass guitar
- Carla Agustina Nazarena López – choir
- Fabricio Ariel Siquie – choir
- Marina Lourdes Valor – choir
- Silvia Tatiana Rasgido – choir
- Ezequiel Fernando Arias – guitar
- Ramiro Antonio Molina – guitar

Additional personnel

- Big One – producer, computer programmer, mastering, mixing
- Oniria – producer
- XAXO – producer
- Juan Manuel Fornasari – executive producer
- Lautaro Palenque – general producer
- Carza – artwork
- Karen Salto – artwork

== Charts ==
| Chart (2021) | Peak position |
|---|---|
| Spanish Albums (Promusicae) | 15 |
