= Temporada de Reggaetón =

EP by Duki
- Released: 25 November 2021
- Genre: Reggaeton
- Length: 22:18
- Language: Spanish
- Label: Dale Play; SSJ
- Producer: Bizarrap; Caleb Calloway; Icon Music; Jowan; Kardu; Naisgai; Prieto; Sébastien Graux; Taiko; Yesan; Zecca

Duki chronology
Vivo Desde el Fin del Mundo (2021)	Temporada de Reggaetón (2021)	Temporada de Reggaetón 2 (2022)

Singles from Temporada de Reggaetón
- 1. "Ley de Atracción" Released: 2 September 2021; 2. "Unfollow" Released: 14 October 2021; 3. "Midtown" Released: 23 November 2021

Temporada de Reggaetón (transl. Reggaeton Season) is the second extended play by Argentine rapper Duki, released through Dale Play Records and SSJ Records on 25 November 2021. Guest appearances include AK4:20, Bizarrap, Juanka, Juhn, Justin Quiles, and Rels B. Production was handled by Bizarrap, Caleb Calloway, Icon Music, Jowan, Kardu, Naisgai, Prieto, Sébastien Graux, Taiko, Yesan, and Zecca.

The lead single, "Ley de Atracción", was released on 2 September 2021. It was followed by "Unfollow" with Justin Quiles and Bizarrap, released on 14 October. The third single, "Midtown", was released on 23 November 2021.

== Track listing ==
Track listing
No.	Title	Writer(s)	Producer(s)	Length
1.	"En Movimiento"	Mauro Ezequiel Lombardo; Nicolás Jaña Galleguillos	Taiko	2:50
2.	"Ley de Atracción"	Lombardo; Héctor C. López Jiménez; Ricardo Andrés Parra Bonalde; Alejandro Prieto Lazaballete	Caleb Calloway; Kardu; Prieto	3:00
3.	"Bici" (with AK4:20 and Juhn featuring Juanka)	Lombardo; Bastián Demonte; Jorge Hernández Quiles; Juan Karlos Bauzá Blasini; Johan Espinosa; Andrés David Restrepo Echavarría	Jowan; Icon Music	4:08
4.	"Midtown"	Lombardo; Francisco Zecca	Zecca	3:25
5.	"Top 5"	Lombardo; Federico Yesan Rojas	Yesan	2:26
6.	"Yin Yan" (with Rels B)	Lombardo; Daniel Heredia Vidal; Luis J. González; Rojas	Naisgai; Yesan; Sébastien Graux	3:09
7.	"Unfollow" (with Justin Quiles and Bizarrap)	Lombardo; Quiles; Gonzalo Julián Conde	Bizarrap	3:16
Total length:				22:18

== Personnel ==
=== Musicians ===
- Mauro Ezequiel Lombardo – lead vocals (1–3, 5, 6), rap vocals (4, 7)
- Bastián Demonte – lead vocals (3)
- Jorge Hernández Quiles – lead vocals (3)
- Juan Karlos Bauzá Blasini – lead vocals (3)
- Daniel Heredia Vidal – lead vocals (6)
- Gonzalo Julián Conde – synthesizer (7)
- Justin Quiles – rap vocals (7)

=== Technical ===
- Big One – mixing
- Javier Fracchia – mastering
- Flavio Bogado – A&R coordinator (1)
- WAV Surgeon – recording (8)

== Charts ==
=== Weekly charts ===
Weekly chart performance
Chart (2021)	Peak position
Spanish Albums (PROMUSICAE)	20

=== Year-end charts ===
Year-end chart performance
Chart (2022)	Position
Spanish Albums (PROMUSICAE)	92

== Certifications ==
Certifications
Region	Certification	Certified units/sales
Spain (PROMUSICAE)	Gold	20,000^{‡}
^{‡} Sales+streaming figures based on certification alone.
