= Rafa Pabön =

Puerto Rican musician

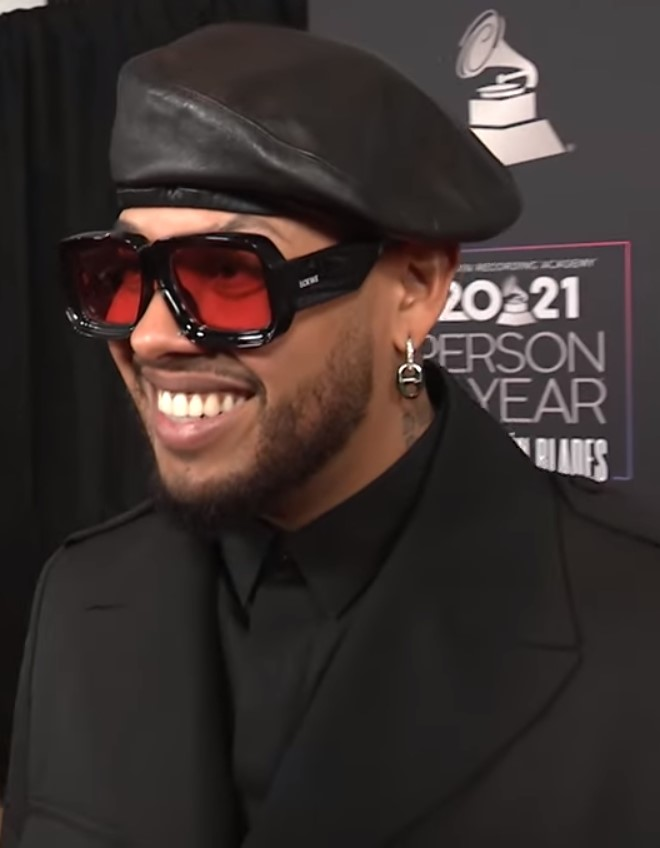
Rafa Pabön in 2021

Rafael Enrique Pabón Navedo, better known by his stage name Rafa Pabön, is a Puerto Rican musician known for his urbano songs. In 2019, his single "Pa Mí" featuring Dalex charted the top 40 on Hot Latin Songs. On March 2, 2019, the single "Ta To Gucci" by Cauty and Pabön peaked at 58 on the Argentina Hot 100.

In May 2020, Pabön released the single "Mírala" with an accompanying music video directed by Joshua Burgos. In June 2020, he released the protest song and music video, "Sin Aire (Without Air)," in response to the murder of George Floyd, the killing of Eric Garner, police brutality, and racial inequality in the United States.
