= Midel =

Argentinian rapper

- Born: Alexis Gonzalo Vallejos; Béccar, Buenos Aires, Argentina
- Genres: Latin trap
- Occupations: Rapper; singer
- Instrument: Vocals
- Years active: 2017–present

Alexis Gonzalo Vallejos, known professionally as Midel, is an Argentine rapper and singer. His music is defined as Latin trap. He is known for being part of the Argentinian trap movement.

== Career ==
Midel started rapping at the age of 13 doing freestyles. He has collaborated with artist such as Seven Kayne, Lucho SSJ, Khea, Duki, and others.

On August 19, 2017, Midel released his first song called B.U.H.O (with Arse, Khea, Duki, Klave, Mykka and Omar Varela), under the record label Mueva Records, the song currently has more than 78 million views on YouTube and 45 million on Spotify.
