= Toda (song) =

2017 single by Alex Rose and Rauw Alejandro

Single by Alex Rose and Rauw Alejandro
- Language: Spanish
- English title: "All"
- Released: December 22, 2017
- Genre: Latin R&B
- Length: 4:00
- Label: Los Oídos Fresh
- Songwriters: Alex Rose; Rauw Alejandro
- Producers: D-Note the Beatllonarie; JX el Ingeniero

Alex Rose singles chronology
"Karma" (2017)	"Toda" (2017)	"Infiel" (2018)

Rauw Alejandro singles chronology
"La Oportunidad" (2017)	"Toda" (2017)	"T.T.I." (2018)

Lyric Video
- "Toda" on YouTube

"Toda" (transl. "All") is a song by Puerto Rican singers Alex Rose and Rauw Alejandro. It was released for digital download and streaming as a single by Los Oídos Fresh on December 22, 2017. A Spanish language R&B song, it has been credited for helping the genre reach a more mainstream audience. It marked both artists' first entry on US Billboard Hot Latin Songs, and became a top-20 hit in multiple Latin American countries, such as Argentina and Peru. An accompanying lyric video was released simultaneously with the song.

A remix of "Toda" with Cazzu, featuring Lenny Tavárez & Lyanno was released on May 31, 2018, as the lead single from Rose's debut studio album ENR (2022). The track received a positive review from a Rolling Stone music critic, who complimented the singers' vocals and named it the "definitive Spanish-language R&B hit" of the year. The remix was commercially successful, being certified 22× platinum (Latin) in the United States. The accompanying music video, released simultaneously with the song, has received over 1.9 billion views on YouTube.

== Background and release ==
Alex Rose was born in 1993 in Carolina, Puerto Rico. During his childhood, his parents used to play salsa music for him to dance, which became his first connection with music. He began songwriting at the age of 14, and subsequently released his first official single, "Orgasmo" in May 2016. After releasing several singles, he collaborated with Rauw Alejandro on "Toda". The song was released for digital download and streaming as a single by Los Oidos Fresh on December 22, 2017. The accompanying lyric video was released simultaneously with the song.

== Music and lyrics ==
"Toda"
A 24-second sample of the song's chorus

Musically, "Toda" is a Spanish language R&B song, written by Rose and Alejandro. It runs for a total of four minutes. The sensual lyrics include, "Seré tuyo por esta noche / Te soltaras antes que desabroche el cinturón / Dime que posiciones tú quieres / Sé que tienes novio pero a mi es que me prefieres / Seré tuyo por esta noche" (I'll be yours for tonight / You'll let go before I unbuckle the seatbelt / Tell me what positions you want / I know you have a boyfriend but you prefer me / I'll be yours for tonight).

== Reception ==
Ayana Rashed from Respect gave "Toda" a positive review, labeling the song as one "that broke both artists in the international urban scene", while crediting it for helping "the genre reach a more mainstream audience". The track debuted at number 32 on the US Billboard Hot Latin Songs chart on October 27, 2018, becoming both Rose and Alejandro's first entry. It reached its peak of number 29, the following week. The song also peaked at number 7 in Costa Rica, and reached the top 20 in Argentina, Dominican Republic, Honduras, Nicaragua, and Peru.

== Remix ==
"Toda" (remix)

Single by Alex Rose, Rauw Alejandro and Cazzu featuring Lenny Tavárez and Lyanno

from the album ENR
- Language: Spanish
- Released: May 31, 2018
- Genre: Latin R&B
- Length: 6:07
- Label: Los Oídos Fresh; WK
- Songwriter: Alexis Guzmán
- Producers: D-Note the Beatllonarie; JX el Ingeniero

Cazzu singles chronology
"Hello, Bitches" (remix) (2018)	"Toda" (remix) (2018)	"Puedo Ser" (2018)

Lenny Tavárez singles chronology
"Toma, Bebé" (remix) (2018)	"Toda" (remix) (2018)	"Empezar de Cero" (2018)

Lyanno singles chronology
"Modo de Avión" (2018)	"Toda" (remix) (2018)	"Preparate" (2018)

Music video
- "Toda" (remix) on YouTube

In April 2018, Alejandro teased the release of a remix for "Toda" on Twitter, using the hashtag #TodaRemix. On May 19, 2018, he shared the artwork for the remix, confirming that it would be a collaboration between himself, Rose, Lenny Tavárez, Lyanno, and Cazzu. He also announced that it would be released on June 1, 2018. The remix was released for digital download and streaming by Oidos Fresh on the specified date, as the lead single for Rose's debut studio album ENR (2022). It was included as the last track on the album.

=== Reception and promotion ===
A screenshot from the music video, depicting Alejandro singing in the street.

Elias Leight from Rolling Stone credited "Toda (Remix)" as the "definitive Spanish-language R&B hit" of the year, labeling it "a sort of R&B counterpart" to "Te Boté", while noting "the careful doses of melisma in Rose's first verse, the smartly arranged backing vocals in Tavárez's hook, [and] the sky-high cry Alejandro lets out before passing the baton to Cazzu".

In Spain's official weekly chart, the song peaked at number 45. It was also certified double platinum by the Productores de Música de España (PROMUSICAE), for track-equivalent sales of over 120,000 units in the country. In the United States, the remix was certified 22× platinum (Latin) by the Recording Industry Association of America (RIAA), for track-equivalent sales of over 1,320,000 units in the United States. The accompanying music video was released simultaneously with the song. As of June 2026, it has received over 1.9 billion views on YouTube.

=== Credits and personnel ===
Credits adapted from Tidal.

- Alex Rose – lead vocalist, composer
- Rauw Alejandro – lead vocalist
- Lenny Tavárez – lead vocalist
- Cazzu – lead vocalist, featured artist
- Lyanno – lead vocalist, featured artist
- D-Note The Beatllionare – producer

== Track listings ==
- Digital download and streaming
1. "Toda" – 4:00
- Digital download and streaming – remix
1. "Toda" (Remix) [feat. Lenny Tavárez & Lyanno] – 6:07
- Digital download and streaming – the remixes
1. "Toda - Remix" – 6:07
2. "Toda - Remix 2" – 4:32
3. "Toda - Real Hasta La Muerte Remix"– 5:03

== Charts ==
=== Weekly charts ===
Weekly peak performance for "Toda"
Chart (2018–2019)	Peak position
Argentina Hot 100 (Billboard)	14
Costa Rica (Monitor Latino)	7
Dominican Republic (Monitor Latino)	13
Honduras (Monitor Latino)	17
Nicaragua (Monitor Latino)	13
Peru (Monitor Latino)	18
US Hot Latin Songs (Billboard)	29

Weekly peak performance for "Toda (Remix)"
Chart (2018–2019)	Peak position
Spain (Promusicae)	45

=== Year-end charts ===
2018 year-end chart performance for "Toda"
Chart (2018)	Position
Costa Rica (Monitor Latino)	79
Dominican Republic (Monitor Latino)	90
Honduras Urbano (Monitor Latino)	89
Paraguay Urbano (Monitor Latino)	67

2018 year-end chart performance for "Toda (Remix)"
Chart (2018)	Position
Dominican Republic (Monitor Latino)	99

== Certifications ==
Certifications and sales for "Toda (Remix)"
Region	Certification	Certified units/sales
Spain (Promusicae)	2× Platinum	120,000^{‡}
United States (RIAA)	22× Platinum (Latin)	1,320,000^{‡}
^{‡} Sales+streaming figures based on certification alone.
