= Temporada de Reggaetón 2 =

EP by Duki
- Released: 23 June 2022
- Genre: Reggaeton
- Length: 21:24
- Language: Spanish
- Label: Dale Play; SSJ
- Producer: Big One; Blow; Félix Lara; Foreign Teck; HooneyBoos; Icon; Jahmar; Jowan; Machael Ángelo Cole; Sébastien Graux; Slow Mike; Yesan; Zecca

Duki chronology
Temporada de Reggaetón (2021)	Temporada de Reggaetón 2 (2022)	Antes de Ameri (2023)

Singles from Temporada de Reggaetón 2
- 1. "Esto Recién Empieza" Released: 14 February 2022; 2. "Si Quieren Frontear" Released: 31 March 2022; 3. "Antes de Perderte" Released: 2 June 2022; 4. "Givenchy" Released: 20 July 2022

Temporada de Reggaetón 2 (transl. Reggaeton Season 2) is the third extended play by Argentine rapper Duki, released through Dale Play Records and SSJ Records on 23 June 2022. Guest appearances include De la Ghetto, Emilia, Mora, and Quevedo. Production was handled by Big One, Blow, Félix Lara, Foreign Teck, HooneyBoos, Icon, Jahmar, Jowan, Machael Ángelo Cole, Sébastien Graux, Slow Mike, Yesan, and Zecca.

The lead single, "Esto Recién Empieza" with Emilia, was released on 14 February 2022. It was followed by "Si Quieren Frontear" with De la Ghetto and Quevedo, released on 31 March. The third single, "Antes de Perderte", was released on 2 June. The fourth single, "Givenchy", was released on 20 July 2022.

== Track listing ==
Track listing
No.	Title	Writer(s)	Producer(s)	Length
1.	"Amor Bipolar" (with Mora)	Mauro Ezequiel Lombardo; Machael Ángelo Cole; Jeremy Jahmal Ayala González; Félix Lara	Cole; Jahmar; Lara	3:15
2.	"Celosa"	Lombardo; Francisco Zecca; Daniel Rondón; Rafael Rodríguez	Zecca; HooneyBoos	2:37
3.	"Perreo Bendito"	Lombardo; Johan Espinosa; Andrés David Restrepo Echavarría; Sébastien Graux; Santiago García Castaño	Jowan; Icon; Graux; Blow	2:39
4.	"Si Quieren Frontear" (with De la Ghetto and Quevedo)	Lombardo; Rafael Castillo Jr.; Pedro Domínguez Quevedo; Miguel Martínez; Federico Yesan Rojas	Slow Mike; Yesan	3:20
5.	"Esto Recién Empieza" (with Emilia)	Lombardo; Emilia Mernes; Daniel Ismael Real	Big One	2:52
6.	"Antes de Perderte"	Lombardo; Real	Big One	2:56
7.	"La Vuelta"	Lombardo; Rojas	Yesan	0:40
8.	"Givenchy"	Lombardo; Michael Hernandez	Foreign Teck	3:02
Total length:				21:24

== Personnel ==
=== Musicians ===
- Mauro Ezequiel Lombardo – lead vocals (1–3, 5–8), rap vocals (4)
- Gabriel Mora Quintero – lead vocals (1)
- Pedro Domínguez Quevedo – rap vocals (4)
- Rafael Castillo Jr. – rap vocals (4)
- Emilia Mernes – lead vocals (5)

=== Technical ===
- Flavio Bogado – A&R coordinator
- Machael Ángelo Cole – mastering (1), mixing (1)
- Daniel Ismael Real – mastering (2–7), mixing (2–7)
- Francisco Zecca – mastering (8), mixing (8)

== Charts ==
=== Weekly charts ===
Weekly chart performance
Chart (2022)	Peak position
Spanish Albums (PROMUSICAE)	3

=== Year-end charts ===
Year-end chart performance
Chart (2022)	Position
Spanish Albums (PROMUSICAE)	31

== Certifications ==
Certifications
Region	Certification	Certified units/sales
Spain (PROMUSICAE)	Gold	20,000^{‡}
^{‡} Sales+streaming figures based on certification alone.
