= Pa Mí =

2018 single by Dalex, Rafa Pabón and Dímelo Flow

Single by Dalex, Rafa Pabön and Dímelo Flow

from the album La Nueva Ola (2018)
- Released: September 19, 2018
- Genre: Reggaeton; Latin trap
- Length: 3:32
- Label: Rich; Ingrooves
- Songwriters: Pedro David Daleccio Torres; Rafael Pabón Cuevas
- Producers: Dímelo Flow; Rike Music

Dalex singles chronology
"Antes Que Te Vayas" (2018)	"Pa Mí" (2018)	"Nadie La Dejo" (2018)

Rafa Pabón singles chronology
"Por Tu Posición" (2018)	"Pa Mí" (2018)	"La Mentira" (2018)

Music video
- "Pa Mí" on YouTube

"Pa Mí" (transl. "For Me") is a Latin urbano and reggaeton song by Puerto Rican-American singer Dalex and Puerto Rican singer Rafa Pabón (stylized as "Pabön"), produced by Panamanian record producer Dímelo Flow, released on September 19, 2018, as a single from Dalex's debut album, La Nueva Ola, "the new wave" (2018). With over 50 million streams on Spotify and more than 13 million music video views on YouTube, "Pa Mí" reached the Top 20 and Top 10 of several countries, including the US Billboard Hot Latin Songs chart.

== Background ==
"Pa Mí", with elements of American hip hop and R&B, most typically represents the genres of Latin trap ("trapetón"), urbano and reggaetón. The track was produced by Panamanian producer Dímelo Flow and by Rike Music.

== Personnel ==
Credits adapted from Tidal:

- Dalex – vocals
- Rafa Pabón – vocals
- Dímelo Flow – producer
- Joshua Mendez – composer
- Sech – vocals (remix)
- Khea – vocals (remix)
- Feid – vocals (remix)
- Cazzu – vocals (remix)
- Lenny Tavárez – vocals (remix)

== Remix ==
On February 6, 2019, a popular remixed version of the track was released, along with a new music video on May 10 of that year. The remix features bars from Argentinian artists Cazzu and Khea, Colombian singer Feid, Puerto Rican singer Lenny Tavárez and Panamanian artist Sech. The remix and its associated music video proved immensely successful, having garnered over 855 million views on YouTube since its release. The entire group went on to perform the remix live together at the Premios Juventud (presented by Univision) in July 2019. There is also an "unplugged", acoustic version (with only guitar accompaniment) featuring all eight artists performing the song backstage during the filming of the remix's music video; uploaded to YouTube on July 26, 2019, the acoustic version has earned over 15 million views.

== Charts ==
=== Weekly charts ===
Weekly chart performance for "Pa Mi Remix"
Chart (2019)	Peak position
Argentina Hot 100 (Billboard)	3
Colombia (National-Report)	29
Costa Rica (Monitor Latino)	8
Ecuador (Monitor Latino)	16
Honduras (Monitor Latino)	9
Italy (FIMI)	78
Mexican Streaming (AMPROFON)	4
Nicaragua (Monitor Latino)	3
Panama (Monitor Latino)	14
Paraguay (SGP)	2
Peru (Monitor Latino)	6
Spain (PROMUSICAE)	6
US Hot Latin Songs (Billboard)	20
US Latin Airplay (Billboard)	25
US Latin Rhythm Airplay (Billboard)	15

=== Year-end charts ===
Year-end chart performance for "Pa Mí"
Chart (2019)	Position
Spain (PROMUSICAE)	14
US Latin by Audience (Monitor Latino)	98
US Hot Latin Songs (Billboard)	53

== Certifications ==
Certifications for "Pa Mí"
Region	Certification	Certified units/sales
Italy (FIMI)	Gold	25,000^{‡}
Spain (Promusicae)	4× Platinum	240,000^{‡}
United States (RIAA)	19× Platinum (Latin)	1,140,000^{‡}
^{‡} Sales+streaming figures based on certification alone.
