= Cazzu =

Argentine rapper and singer (born 1993)

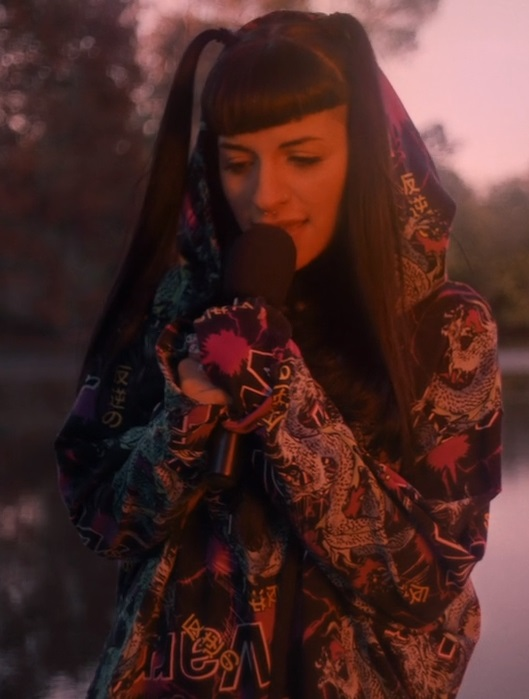
- Cazzu in 2019

Background information
- Born: Julieta Emilia Cazzuchelli; 16 December 1993 (age 32); Fraile Pintado, Jujuy, Argentina
- Genres: Latin trap; Latin R&B; Latin hip-hop
- Occupations: Rapper; singer
- Years active: 2017–present
- Labels: Seven; Mueva; Rimas; Machete; Universal Latino; Roc Nation

Julieta Emilia Cazzuchelli (born 16 December 1993), known professionally as Cazzu, is an Argentine rapper, singer, poet and writer. Born and raised in Fraile Pintado, Jujuy, she is known widely as "La Jefa" and "Madre del Trap" for being a pioneer in shaping the Latin Trap Movement. Initially gaining popularity with her trap saga "C14torce", she has expanded her sound to include R&B and hip-hop. Her most recent work, Latinaje, explores Andean folklore and traditional sounds, while also dabbling in new genres such as corrido tumbados, described by Rolling Stone as "a sprawling, ambitious, and unifying celebration of Latin American music".

== Early life ==
Julieta Emilia Cazzuchelli was born on 16 December 1993 in Fraile Pintado, Jujuy to an Argentine mother and to an Italian father. She had been interested in music since she was eleven years old. She started singing with her father, who was also a musician and who inspired her to become one. When she finished high school, she moved to Tucumán to study cinematography and, some time after, she moved to the Buenos Aires Province to study graphic design.

== Career ==
Cazzuchelli started her musical career as a cumbia singer and then as a rock singer. She began as an independent artist, paying for her first recordings and video clips, and under the pseudonym Cazzu, she has emerged as one of the most prominent Argentine trap artists. In an interview with Billboard Argentina, she said: "For me, Cazzu is everything I want to be. She's my alter ego, she's a damn superhero."

She gained popularity in the Latin trap music scene after the release of her collaboration "Loca" with fellow Argentine rappers Khea and Duki. The song gained further popularity following the release of a remix featuring Bad Bunny.

== Discography ==
=== Studio albums ===
List of studio albums, with selected details and chart positions
| Title | Studio album details | Peak chart positions | | |
| Title | Studio album details | SPA | US Latin | US Latin Pop |
|---|---|---|---|---|
| Error 93 | Released: 3 June 2019; Label: Rimas; Formats: CD, digital download, streaming | 84 | — | — |
| Nena Trampa | Released: 30 May 2022; Label: Rimas; Formats: LP, digital download, streaming | — | — | — |
| Latinaje | Released: 24 April 2025; Label: Dale Play, Rimas; Formats: Digital download, streaming | — | 48 | 4 |
"—" denotes a recording that did not chart or was not released in that territory.

=== Mixtapes ===
List of mixtapes with selected details
| Title | Studio album details |
|---|---|
| Maldades | Released: 25 October 2017; Label: Seven; Formats: CD, digital download, streaming |

=== EPs ===
List of EPS, with selected details and certifications
| Title | Studio album details | Certifications |
|---|---|---|
| Bonus Trap | Released: 23 April 2020; Label: Machete; Formats: Digital download, streaming | CAPIF: Platinum |
| Una Niña Inútil | Released: 28 August 2020; Label: Machete, Universal Latino; Formats: CD, digital download, streaming | |

=== Singles ===
==== As lead artist ====
List of singles as lead artist, showing selected chart positions, certifications, and associated albums
| Title | Year | Peak chart positions | | | | | | | | | | Certifications | Album |
| Title | Year | ARG | BOL | DOM | ECU | MEX | PER | SPA | URU | US Latin | WW | Certifications | Album |
|---|---|---|---|---|---|---|---|---|---|---|---|---|---|
| "Más" | 2017 | — | — | — | — | — | — | — | — | — | — | | Maldades |
| "Maldades" | 2017 | — | — | — | — | — | — | — | — | — | — | | Maldades |
| "Ay Papi" (with la Joaqui) | 2017 | — | — | — | — | — | — | — | — | — | — | | Non-album single |
| "Killa" | 2017 | — | — | — | — | — | — | — | — | — | — | | Maldades |
| "El Don" | 2017 | — | — | — | — | — | — | — | — | — | — | | Maldades |
| "Fantasías" | 2017 | — | — | — | — | — | — | — | — | — | — | | Maldades |
| "C14TORCE" (featuring Homer) | 2018 | — | — | — | — | — | — | — | — | — | — | | Non-album single |
| "R.I.P." | 2018 | — | — | — | — | — | — | — | — | — | — | | Maldades |
| "Chapiadora" | 2018 | — | — | — | — | — | — | — | — | — | — | | Non-album single |
| "Hello Bitches (Remix)" (featuring Eladio Carrión) | 2018 | — | — | — | — | — | — | — | — | — | — | | Maldades |
| "Toda (Remix)" (with Alex Rose and Rauw Alejandro featuring Lenny Távarez and Lyanno) | 2018 | 12 | — | — | — | — | — | 45 | — | — | — | PROMUSICAE: 2× Platinum; RIAA: 22× Platinum (Latin) | Non-album singles |
| "Puedo Ser" (with Maikel Delacalle) | 2018 | 95 | — | — | — | — | — | — | — | — | — | | Non-album singles |
| "N.A.V.E." | 2018 | 65 | — | — | — | — | — | — | — | — | — | | Non-album singles |
| "C14TORCE II" | 2019 | 85 | — | — | — | — | — | — | — | — | — | | Non-album singles |
| "Brujería" | 2019 | — | — | — | — | — | — | — | — | — | — | | Non-album singles |
| "Visto a las 00:00" | 2019 | 56 | — | 10 | — | — | — | — | — | — | — | | Error 93 |
| "Mucha Data" | 2019 | 60 | — | — | — | — | — | — | — | — | | | Error 93 |
| "Nada" (featuring Lyanno, Rauw Alejandro and Dalex) | 2019 | 65 | — | — | — | — | — | — | — | — (Note: "Nada" did not enter the Billboard Hot Latin Songs chart, but peaked at number 14 on the Latin Digital Song Sales chart.) | — | PROMUSICAE: Platinum | Error 93 |
| "Mentiste" | 2019 | — | — | — | — | — | — | — | — | — | — | | Error 93 |
| "C14TORCE III" | 2020 | — | — | — | — | — | — | — | — | — | — | | Non-album single |
| "Esquina" (with Eladio Carrión and Noriel) | 2020 | — | — | — | — | — | — | — | — | — | — | | Bonus Trap |
| "Me Prefiere a Mí" (with Myke Towers) | 2020 | — | — | — | — | — | — | — | — | — | — | | Bonus Trap |
| "Bounce" | 2020 | 53 | — | — | — | — | — | — | — | — | — | | Bonus Trap |
| "Cazzu: Bzrp Music Sessions, Vol. 32" (with Bizarrap) | 2020 | 16 | — | — | — | — | — | — | — | — | — | AMPROFON: Platinum+Gold | Non-album single |
| "Miedo" | 2020 | — | — | — | — | — | — | — | — | — | — | | Una Niña Inútil |
| "Gatita Gangster" (with Ñengo Flow) | 2020 | — | — | — | — | — | — | — | — | — | — | | Non-album single |
| "Cama Vacía" (with Ecko) | 2020 | — | — | — | — | — | — | — | — | — | — | | Young Golden |
| "Ladrón" (with Lali) | 2020 | 37 | — | — | — | — | — | — | — | — | — | | Libra |
| "Solita (Remix)" (with Mechi Pieretti and la Joaqui) | 2020 | — | — | — | — | — | — | — | — | — | — | | Non-album single |
| "Espejismos" (with Bhavi) | 2020 | — | — | — | — | — | — | — | — | — | — | | Cinema |
| "Dándote" (with Chita and Lara91k) | 2020 | — | — | — | — | — | — | — | — | — | — | | Non-album single |
| "Animal" (with María Becerra) | 2021 | 5 | — | — | — | — | — | — | — | — | — | | Animal, Pt. 1 |
| "C14TORCE IV" | 2021 | — | — | — | — | — | — | — | — | — | — | | Non-album single |
| "Las Nenas" (with Natti Natasha and Farina featuring La Duraca) | 2021 | 80 | — | — | — | — | — | — | 21 | — (Note: "Las Nenas" did not enter the Billboard Hot Latin Songs chart, but peaked at number eight on the Latin Digital Song Sales chart.) | — | AMPROFON: Gold; PROMUSICAE: Platinum; RIAA: Platinum (Latin) | Nattividad |
| "Turra" (with DJ Alan Gomez) | 2021 | 34 | — | — | — | — | — | — | — | — | — | | Non-album singles |
| "Dime Dónde" (with Justin Quiles) | 2021 | 51 | — | — | — | — | — | — | — | — | — | | Non-album singles |
| "Sobre Mi Tumba" | 2021 | — | — | — | — | — | — | — | — | — | — | | Non-album singles |
| "Castigo" | 2021 | — | — | — | — | — | — | — | — | — | — | | Non-album singles |
| "C14torce V: Balada para un Alien" | 2022 | — | — | — | — | — | — | — | — | — | — | | Non-album singles |
| "Jefa" | 2022 | — | — | — | — | — | — | — | — | — | — | | Nena Trampa |
| "Maléfica" (with María Becerra) | 2022 | 20 | — | — | — | — | — | — | — | — | — | | Nena Trampa |
| "Tú y Tú" (with Los Ángeles Azules and Santa Fe Klan) | 2022 | — | 13 | — | — | — | — | — | — | 47 | — | AMPROFON: Gold | Se Agradece |
| "Brinca" (with Young Miko) | 2023 | 66 | — | — | — | — | — | — | — | — | — | | Nena Trampa |
| "Glock" (with La Joaqui) | 2023 | 53 | — | — | — | — | — | — | — | — | — | | Nena Trampa |
| "La Cueva" | 2024 | 50 | 23 | — | — | — | — | — | — | 27 | — | AMPROFON: Gold | Latinaje |
| "Dolce" | 2025 | 39 | — | — | — | — | — | — | — | — (Note: "Dolce" did not enter the Billboard Hot Latin Songs chart, but peaked at number 13 on the Latin Digital Song Sales chart.) | — | AMPROFON: Gold | Latinaje |
| "Con Otra" | 2025 | 1 | 1 | — | 25 | 24 | 21 | — | 1 | 30 | 76 | AMPROFON: Platinum | Latinaje |
| "Ódiame" | 2025 | — | — | — | — | — | — | — | — | — | — | | Latinaje |
| "Mala Suerte" | 2025 | 76 | — | — | — | — | — | — | — | — | — | | Latinaje |
| "Balada Malvada" | 2025 | — | — | — | — | — | — | — | — | — | — | | Non-album singles |
| "Otro Como Tú" | 2025 | — | — | — | — | — | — | — | — | — | — | | Non-album singles |
| "Jujuy Estrellado" | 2026 | — | — | — | — | — | — | — | — | — | — | | Non-album singles |
| "Perdón Si No Te Llamé" | 2026 | — | — | — | — | — | — | — | — | — | — | | Non-album singles |
"—" denotes a recording that did not chart or was not released in that territory.

==== As a featured artist ====
List of singles as a featured artist, showing selected chart positions, certifications, and associated albums
| Title | Year | Peak chart positions | | | | | Certifications | Album |
| Title | Year | ARG | ECU | ITA | SPA | US Latin | Certifications | Album |
|---|---|---|---|---|---|---|---|---|
| "Loca" (Khea featuring Duki and Cazzu and remix with Bad Bunny) | 2017 | 3 | — | — | 65 | 45 | PROMUSICAE: Platinum* PROMUSICAE: Platinum (Remix); RIAA: Gold (Latin); RIAA: Gold (Latin) (Remix) | Non-album singles |
| "Mi Cubana (Remix)" (with Eladio Carrión and Khea featuring ECKO) | 2018 | — | — | — | — | — | | Non-album singles |
| "Gas Montaña (Remix)" (with Negro Fino featuring Hitboy and OsxWanShot) | 2018 | — | — | — | — | — | | Cumbia Nena 2 |
| "Cowboy" (with Dellafuente and Lowlight) | 2018 | — | — | — | — | — | | Non-album singles |
| "Lo Tengo" (with Dayme y El High and Alemán featuring Lito Kirino) | 2018 | — | — | — | — | — | | Non-album singles |
| "Miénteme (Remix)" (with Sousa, Rauw Alejandro, Lyanno and Álvaro Diaz) | 2019 | — | — | — | — | — | RIAA: Gold (Latin) | Non-album singles |
| "Pa Mi (Remix)" (Dalex and Rafa Pabön featuring Feid, Khea, Sech, Cazzu and Lenny Távarez) | 2019 | 3 | 16 | 78 | 6 | — | PROMUSICAE: 4× Platinum; RIAA: 19× Platinum (Latin) | Climaxxx |
| "Tumbando El Club (Remix)" (Neo Pistea featuring C.R.O., Obiewanshot, Ysy A, Cazzu, Khea, Lucho SSJ, Coqeéin Montana, Marcianos Crew and Duki) | 2019 | 3 | — | — | — | — | CAPIF: Platinum; PROMUSICAE: Gold; AMPROFON: Gold | Non-album singles |
| "La Mentira (Remix)" (Brytiago featuring Rafa Pabön, Sech, Rauw Alejandro, Cazzu and Myke Towers) | 2019 | — | — | — | — | — | PROMUSICAE: Gold | Non-album singles |
| "Quien Empezó" (J Mena featuring Cazzu) | 2019 | 51 | — | — | — | — | | La Cobra |
| "Tengo 30" (Khea featuring Duki, Cazzu, Neo Pistea and Tali Goya) | 2019 | 45 | — | — | — | — | | Non-album singles |
| "Se Te Nota" (with Alejo Park and Izzay) | 2019 | — | — | — | — | — | | Non-album singles |
| "Lento" (Tainy, Sean Paul and Mozart La Para featuring Cazzu) | 2020 | — | — | — | — | — | | Neon16 Tape: The Kids that Grew Up on Reggaetón |
| "Rangos II" (Pekeño 77 featuring Cazzu, Neo Pistea, C.R.O, Bhavi, Homer El Mero Mero and Rubén Rada) | 2020 | 46 | — | — | — | — | | Non-album singles |
| "Cazzu: DJ Tao Turreo Sesions #9" (DJ Tao featuring Cazzu) | 2022 | 68 | — | — | — | — | | Non-album singles |
| "Matatan (Remix)" (Kaleb Di Masi featuring Ecko, Cazzu, Brray, Alan Gómez & DJ Tao) | 2022 | 37 | — | — | — | — | | Non-album singles |
"—" denotes a recording that did not chart or was not released in that territory.

== Awards and nominations ==
| Awards | Year | Category | Nominated work | Result | Ref. |
|---|---|---|---|---|---|
| Billboard Latin Music Awards | 2025 | Top Latin Albums Artist of the Year, Female | Herself | Pending | |
| Billboard Latin Music Awards | 2025 | Latin Pop Album of the Year | Latinaje | Pending | |
| Gardel Awards | 2020 | Best Trap/Urban Song or Album | "C14TORCE II" | Nominated | |
| Gardel Awards | 2020 | Best Trap/Urban Song or Album | "Tumbando el Club" (remix) | Nominated | |
| Gardel Awards | 2020 | Best Trap/Urban Collaboration | "Tumbando el Club" (remix) | Nominated | |
| Gardel Awards | 2021 | Song of the Year | "Ladrón" (with Lali) | Won | |
| Gardel Awards | 2021 | Best Urban/Trap Song or Album | Una Niña Inútil | Nominated | |
| Gardel Awards | 2021 | Best Conceptual Album | Una Niña Inútil | Nominated | |
| Gardel Awards | 2021 | Best Cover Design | Una Niña Inútil | Nominated | |
| Gardel Awards | 2023 | Best Urban Music Album | Nena Trampa | Nominated | |
| Gardel Awards | 2025 | Best Urban Pop Song | "La Cueva" | Nominated | |
| Latin Grammy Awards | 2020 | Best New Artist | Herself | Nominated | |
| MTV Millennial Awards | 2019 | Viral Artist | Herself | Nominated | |
| MTV Millennial Awards | 2021 | Argentine Artist | Herself | Nominated | |
| MTV Millennial Awards | 2021 | Music-Ship of the Year | "Las Nenas" (with Natti Natasha, Farina & La Duraca) | Nominated | |
| MTV Millennial Awards | 2023 | Couple Goals | Herself & Christian Nodal | Nominated | |
| Premios Juventud | 2019 | Best New Artist | Herself | Nominated | |
| Premios Juventud | 2020 | The New Generation - Female | Herself | Won | |
| Premios Juventud | 2020 | Trendsetter | Herself | Nominated | |
| Premios Juventud | 2021 | Female Youth Artist of the Year | Herself | Nominated | |
| Premios Juventud | 2021 | Album of the Year | Una Niña Inútil | Nominated | |
| Premios Juventud | 2022 | Female Artist – On the Rise | Herself | Nominated | |
| Premios Juventud | 2023 | Girl Power | "Brinca" (with Young Miko) | Nominated | |
| Premios Juventud | 2023 | Best Urban Album – Female | Nena Trampa | Nominated | |
| Premios Juventud | 2023 | Best Regional Mexican Fusion | "Tú Y Tú" (with Los Ángeles Azules & Santa Fe Klan) | Nominated | |
| Premios Juventud | 2023 | Couples That Blow Up My Social | Herself & Christian Nodal | Nominated | |
| Tu Música Urbano Awards | 2019 | Best Foreign Female Artist | Herself | Nominated | |
| Tu Música Urbano Awards | 2019 | Remix of the Year | "Toda" (remix) | Nominated | |
| Tu Música Urbano Awards | 2020 | Top New Generation Female Artist | Herself | Nominated | |
| Tu Música Urbano Awards | 2020 | Female Album of the Year | Error 93 | Nominated | |
