= Ameri (album) =

Studio album by Duki
- Released: 31 October 2024
- Genres: Latin trap; reggaeton
- Length: 45:48
- Languages: Spanish; English (Note: The album includes English-language lyrics on the tracks "Brindis", "Hardaway", and "Wake Up & Bake Up".)
- Labels: Dale Play; SSJ
- Producers: Asan; Bizarrap; Club Hats; Ivo Wosco; Macnificent; Mike Dean; Ninesoul; Oniria; Pru; Ronny J; Sick Luke; Sid; Slo Meezy; TM88; Toni Anzis; Tuiste; WAV Surgeon; Yama; Yesan; Zecca

Duki chronology
Antes de Ameri (2023)	Ameri (2024)	5202 (2025)

Singles from Ameri
- 1. "Barro" Released: 17 October 2024; 2. "Constelación" Released: 29 October 2024

Ameri is the fourth studio album by Argentine rapper Duki, released through Dale Play Records and SSJ Records on 31 October 2024. Guest appearances include Bizarrap, Eladio Carrión, Headie One, Judeline, Lia Kali, Lucho SSJ, Milo J, Morad, Myke Towers, Ovi, YG, and Ysy A. Production was primarily handled by Asan and Yesan, alongside Ronny J, Bizarrap, Ivo Wosco, Tuiste, Yama, Club Hats, Ninesoul, Pru, WAV Surgeon, Oniria, Sick Luke, Macnificent, Sid, Slo Meezy, TM88, Toni Anzis, Mike Dean, and Zecca.

The lead single "Barro" was released on 17 October 2024. The second single was "Constelación" with Lia Kali, released on 29 October 2024.

== Track listing ==
Track listing
No.	Title	Writer(s)	Producer(s)	Length
1.	"Leitmotiv"	Mauro Ezequiel Lombardo; Federico Yesan Rojas; Tomás Santos Juan	Yesan; Asan	1:25
2.	"Nueva Era" (with Myke Towers)	Lombardo; Rojas; Michael Anthony Torres Monge; Juan	Yesan; Asan	3:37
3.	"Brindis" (with Headie One)	Lombardo; Rojas; Irving Ampofo Adjei; Ronald Oneil Spence Jr.; Juan	Yesan; Asan; Ronny J	3:00
4.	"Buscarte Lejos" (with Bizarrap)	Lombardo; Gonzalo Julián Conde; Jaime Martín James; Juan Casado Fisac; Santiago Alvarado	Bizarrap	3:14
5.	"Imperio" (with Judeline)	Lombardo; Rojas; Iván Woscoboinik; Lara Fernández Castrelo; Pablo López García; Juan	Yesan; Asan; Tuiste; Ivo Wosco	2:48
6.	"Hardaway" (with YG and Eladio Carrión)	Lombardo; Carrión; Rojas; José Jamil Díaz Medina; Keenon Dequan Ray Jackson; Juan	Yama; Yesan; Asan	3:36
7.	"Cine"	Lombardo; Rojas; Juan	Yesan; Asan; Yama	2:22
8.	"Vida de Rock" (with Milo J)	Lombardo; Camilo Joaquín Villarruel; Rojas; Juan Petti; Juan	Club Hats; Yesan; Asan	3:01
9.	"No Drama" (with Ovi and Lucho SSJ)	Lombardo; Rojas; Juan Alonso V. Ángulo; Luciano Nahuel Vega; Miguel Correa; Nain Isai Padilla; Ovidio Crespo; Juan	Yesan; Asan; Pru; Ninesoul; WAV Surgeon	2:54
10.	"Barro"	Lombardo; Rojas; Luis Alberto Spinetta; Juan	Yesan; Asan	3:21
11.	"Un Día Más" (with Ysy A)	Lombardo; Alejo Nahuel Acosta; Rojas; Tomás Díaz Zuleta; Juan	Yesan; Asan; Oniria	2:45
12.	"Trato de Estar Bien" (with Morad)	Lombardo; Rojas; Luca Antonio Barker; Morad El Khattouti El Horami; Juan	Yesan; Asan; Sick Luke	3:33
13.	"Wake Up & Bake Up" (with Wiz Khalifa and Arcángel)	Lombardo; Austin Agustín Santos; Bryan Lamar Simmons; Cameron Jibril Thomaz; Rojas; Gregory Davis II; Kenneth Smith Jr.; Sidney Malabre Tapaquon; Juan	TM88; Slo Meezy; Sid; Macnificent; Yesan; Asan	3:26
14.	"Constelación" (with Lia Kali)	Lombardo; Antonio Salmerón Aguado; Rojas; Woscoboinik; Júlia Isern Tomás; Juan	Yesan; Asan; Toni Anzis; Ivo Wosco	3:20
15.	"Ameri"	Lombardo; Rojas; Francisco Zecca; Michael George Dean; Juan	Yesan; Asan; Zecca; Mike Dean	3:19
Total length:				45:48

== Personnel ==
=== Musicians ===
- Mauro Ezequiel Lombardo – lead vocals (1–9, 11–15), rap vocals (10)
- Federico Yesan Rojas – synthesizer (1–3, 5–15)
- Tomás Santos Juan – synthesizer (1–3, 5–15)
- Michael Anthony Torres Monge – lead vocals (2)
- Irving Ampofo Adjei – lead vocals (3)
- Ronald Oneil Spence Jr. – synthesizer (3)
- Gonzalo Julián Conde – synthesizer (4)
- Iván Woscoboinik – synthesizer (5, 14)
- Lara Fernández Castrelo – lead vocals (5)
- Pablo López García – synthesizer (5)
- José Jamil Díaz Medina – synthesizer (6, 7)
- Eladio Carrión Morales – lead vocals (6)
- Keenon Dequan Ray Jackson – lead vocals (6)
- Camilo Joaquín Villarruel – lead vocals (8)
- Juan Petti – synthesizer (8)
- Juan Alonso V. Ángulo – synthesizer (9)
- Luciano Nahuel Vega – lead vocals (9)
- Ovidio Crespo – lead vocals (9)
- Coro Rock – other instruments (10)
- Emilia Mernes – background vocals (10)
- Juan Pablo Morando – vocal engineer (10)
- Alejo Nahuel Acosta – lead vocals (11)
- Tomás Díaz Zuleta – synthesizer (11)
- Luca Antonio Barker – synthesizer (12)
- Morad El Khattouti El Horami – lead vocals (12)
- Austin Agustín Santos – lead vocals (13)
- Bryan Lamar Simmons – synthesizer (13)
- Cameron Jibril Thomaz – lead vocals (13)
- Gregory Davis II – synthesizer (13)
- Kenneth Smith Jr. – synthesizer (13)
- Sidney Malabre Tapaquon – synthesizer (13)
- Antonio Salmerón Aguado – synthesizer (14)
- Júlia Isern Tomás – lead vocals (14)
- Francisco Zecca – synthesizer (15)
- Michael George Dean – synthesizer (15)

=== Technical ===
- Javier Fracchia – surround mixing
- Brian Taylor – mixing (1–10, 12–15)
- Dave Kutch – mastering (1–10, 12–15)
- WAV Surgeon – recording (3, 6, 7, 9, 11)

== Charts ==
=== Weekly charts ===
Weekly chart performance
Chart (2024)	Peak position
Spanish Albums (Promusicae)	1

=== Year-end charts ===
Year-end chart performance
Chart (2024)	Position
Spanish Albums (PROMUSICAE)	62

== Certifications ==
Certifications
Region	Certification	Certified units/sales
Spain (Promusicae)	Gold	20,000^{‡}
^{‡} Sales+streaming figures based on certification alone.

== Release history ==
Release dates and formats
Region	Date	Label(s)	Format(s)	Ref.
Various	31 October 2024	Dale Play; SSJ	Digital download; streaming	
Argentina	6 March 2025	Dale Play; SSJ	Vinyl	
