= 5202 =

Mixtape by Duki
- Released: 7 July 2025
- Genre: Latin trap
- Length: 31:12
- Language: Spanish
- Label: Dale Play; SSJ
- Producer: 1MillionUSD; Ansel; Asan; DamnHomieDamn; IceEyes; Ivo Wosco; J. LBS; LilJuMadeDaBeat; Nadddot; Nake; Southside; Uli; Wheezy; Yesan

Duki chronology
Ameri (2024)	5202 (2025)

Singles from 5202
- 1. "Golfista" Released: 29 May 2025; 2. "No Me Alcanza" Released: 24 June 2025

5202 is the debut mixtape by Argentine rapper Duki, released through Dale Play Records and SSJ Records on 7 July 2025. Guest appearances include Clúster and Zell. Production was handled by 1MillionUSD, Ansel, Asan, DamnHomieDamn, IceEyes, Ivo Wosco, J. LBS, LilJuMadeDaBeat, Nadddot, Nake, Southside, Uli, Wheezy, and Yesan.

The lead single "Golfista" was released on 29 May 2025. The second single was "No Me Alcanza", released on 24 June 2025.

== Track listing ==
Track listing
No.	Title	Writer(s)	Producer(s)	Length
1.	"[Free] 5202 Type Beat"	Mauro Ezequiel Lombardo; Federico Yesan Rojas; Iván Woscoboinik	Yesan; Ivo Wosco	2:38
2.	"Golfista"	Lombardo; Anselmo Castro	Ansel	2:36
3.	"Agarro la Plata" (with Clúster)	Lombardo; Luca Marotta; Pablo Enzo Recaite	1MillionUSD	2:02
4.	"2Tonos"	Lombardo; Woscoboinik	Wosco; IceEyes	2:13
5.	"Eclipse Solar"	Lombardo; Alejandro Álvarez Murga; Andreas Cristian Matura	Nake; Nadddot	2:28
6.	"Toc Psycho x Cryptonita"	Lombardo; Álvarez Murga; Rojas; Woscoboinik; Matura; Rubén Portela Muñoz	Nake; Yesan; Wosco; Nadddot; DamnHomieDamn	3:11
7.	"Yo-Yo"	Lombardo; Julian Martrel Mason; Jason Kevin Pounds	LilJuMadeDaBeat; J. LBS	2:46
8.	"En Parte... No Lo Sé"	Lombardo; Woscoboinik; Rojas; Tomás Santos Juan; Ulises Barón Miranda; Álvarez Murga	Wosco; Yesan; Asan; Uli; Nake	3:18
9.	"Calabasas" (with Zell)	Lombardo; Alan Ezequiel Gauto; Álvarez Murga	Nake	3:26
10.	"100pre@Límite"	Lombardo; Álvarez Murga; Matura	Nake; Nadddot	3:05
11.	"No Me Alcanza"	Lombardo; Wesley Tyler Glass; Joshua Howard Luellen	Wheezy; Southside	3:24
Total length:				31:12

== Personnel ==
=== Musicians ===
- Mauro Ezequiel Lombardo – lead vocals
- Luca Marotta – lead vocals (3)
- Alan Ezequiel Gauto – lead vocals (9)

=== Technical ===
- Federico Yesan Rojas – synthesizer (1, 6, 8)
- Iván Woscoboinik – synthesizer (1, 4, 6, 8)
- Anselmo Castro – synthesizer (2)
- Pablo Enzo Recaite – synthesizer (3)
- Alejandro Álvarez Murga – synthesizer (5, 6, 9)
- Andreas Cristian Matura – synthesizer (5, 6, 10)
- Rubén Portela Muñoz – synthesizer (6)
- Jason Kevin Pounds – synthesizer (7)
- Julian Martrel Mason – synthesizer (7)
- Tomás Santos Juan – synthesizer (8)
- Ulises Barón Miranda – synthesizer (8)
- Joshua Howard Luellen – synthesizer (11)
- Wesley Tyler Glass – synthesizer (11)

== Charts ==
Chart performance
Chart (2025)	Peak position
Spanish Albums (PROMUSICAE)	15
