= Antes de Ameri =

Studio album by Duki
- Released: 22 June 2023
- Recorded: 2021–2023
- Genre: Latin trap; pop rap
- Length: 35:21
- Label: Dale Play; SSJ
- Producer: Yesan; Asan; Zecca; Ramiro VCA; Nake; Smash David; Ivo Wosco; Big One; Brian Taylor

Duki chronology
Vivo Desde el Fin del Mundo (2021)	Antes de Ameri (2023)	Ameri (2024)

Singles from Antes de Ameri
- 1. "Harakiri" Released: 30 March 2023; 2. "Apollo 13" Released: 3 May 2023; 3. "Rockstar 2.0" Released: 21 June 2023; 4. "Don't Lie" Released: 24 June 2023

Antes de Ameri (transl. Before Ameri) is the third studio album by Argentine rapper Duki, released through Dale Play Records and SSJ Records on 22 June 2023. Marking Lombardo's return to Latin trap, the project is a concept album with songs connected to each other through transitions. It featured the production of Yesan, Asan, Zecca, Ramiro VCA, Nake, Smash David, Ivo Wosco, Big One and Brian Taylor.

The lead single, "Harakiri" with C.R.O, was released on 30 March 2023. Other three songs were released as singles: "Apollo 13", "Rockstar 2.0" with Jhayco, and "Don't Lie" with Quevedo.

== Background ==
After Desde el Fin del Mundo, Lombardo announced that he would focus on a "commercial facet", beginning to appear in multiple collaborations with renowned artists such as Tini, Emilia Mernes, Tiago PZK, MYA, Nicki Nicole or Bizarrap, and venturing more into the reggaeton and pop genre with the releases of his EP Temporada de Reggaetón. Lombardo commented that the reason for his decision was that he wanted to test his performance on the charts and the mainstream. In the second part of the EP, Lombardo announced his "return to trap" with flyers placed around Buenos Aires, Madrid and Mexico City with his new single "Givenchy", which ended up being released on 20 July 2022. Along with this, Lombardo performed a historic string of concerts at the Amalfitani stadium in Vélez Sársfield, becoming the first artist of his litter to perform a concert in a football stadium. On 16 November 2022, he released his long-awaited Bizarrap Music Session in which Lombardo took a tour of his musical career. After this, Lombardo announced that he was starting to work on his new album for 2023 under the name Temporada de Diablos.

On 10 June, Lombardo posted the official tracklist for the album via Twitter. On 15 June, he announced the official title Antes de Ameri and its release date of 22 June. The next day, he revealed the official cover, and in turn, clarified that the album was intended to be played from the first song to the last, and not randomly.

== Promotion ==
After going six months without releasing music on his own, on 17 February 2023 Lombardo released "Si Me Sobrara el Tiempo" as the first single from what would be his next album. However, on 30 March, he released "Harakiri" together with C.R.O, a song that Lombardo also announced as the first single from his next album in an Instagram post, hinting that there could be two albums to be released. The next singles released were "Apollo 13" on 3 May, which had leaked several months earlier, and "Rockstar 2.0" with Jhayco on 21 June, as a sequel to the original song "Rockstar" that Lombardo had released in 2018.

== Track listing ==
Track listing
No.	Title	Writer(s)	Producer(s)	Length
1.	"01 de Enero" (with Lucho SSJ)	Mauro Lombardo; Francisco Zecca; Luciano Nahuel Vega; Ramiro Sánchez	Zecca; Ramiro VCA	1:54
2.	"Jefes del Sudoeste"	Lombardo; Zecca; Alejandro Álvarez Murga	Zecca; Nake	2:27
3.	"Rockstar 2.0" (with Jhayco)	Lombardo; Zecca; Federico Yesan Rojas; Juno Watt; Smash David; Tomás Santos Juan	Zecca; Yesan; Asan; Smash David	2:53
4.	"Harakiri" (with C.R.O)	Lombardo; Rojas; Juan; Tomás Manuel Campos	Yesan; Asan	2:41
5.	"Contra Mí" (with West Dubai)	Lombardo; Rojas; Juan; Álvarez Murga; Rachid El Majnaqui Godoy	Yesan; Asan; Nake	2:39
6.	"Csipher" (audio latino; with Akapellah and Neutro Shorty featuring Micro TDH)	Lombardo; Zecca; Liomar Rocardo Acosta Orta; Pedro Elías Aquino; Fernando Morillo	Zecca	4:10
7.	"Gigi"	Lombardo; Rojas; Juan; Álvarez Murga; Iván Woscoboinik	Yesan; Asan; Ivo Wosco; Nake	2:25
8.	"Don't Lie" (with Quevedo)	Lombardo; Rojas; Juan; Woscoboinik; Pedro Domínguez Quevedo	Yesan; Asan; Ivo Wosco	3:33
9.	"Antes de Perderte" (OG version)	Lombardo; Daniel Ismael Real	Big One	2:46
10.	"Uno Dos" (with Salastkbron)	Lombardo; Rojas; Juan; Woscoboinik; Brian Taylor; Santiago Yair Massa	Yesan; Asan; Ivo Wosco; Brian Taylor	2:45
11.	"N.C.L.C"	Lombardo; Zecca; Rojas; Juan	Yesan; Asan; Zecca	1:26
12.	"Apollo 13"	Lombardo; Rojas; Zecca	Yesan; Zecca	2:38
13.	"Último Tren a Ameri"	Lombardo; Rojas; Zecca	Yesan; Zecca	1:51
14.	"Buscando Ameri"	Lombardo; Zecca; Juan	Yesan; Asan	1:04
Total length:				35:21

== Charts ==
=== Weekly charts ===
Weekly chart performance
Chart (2023)	Peak position
Spanish Albums (PROMUSICAE)	2

=== Year-end charts ===
Year-end chart performance
Chart (2023)	Position
Spanish Albums (PROMUSICAE)	57

== Certifications ==
Certifications
Region	Certification	Certified units/sales
Spain (PROMUSICAE)	Gold	20,000^{‡}
^{‡} Sales+streaming figures based on certification alone.
