= Súper Sangre Joven =

2019 debut studio album by Duki

Studio album by Duki
- Released: 1 November 2019
- Recorded: 2017–2019
- Genre: Latin trap; hip hop
- Length: 32:32
- Label: SSJ; Dale Play
- Producer: NEUEN; Sky; Asan; Fntxy; El Sidechain

Duki chronology
Súper Sangre Joven (2019)	Desde el Fin del Mundo (2021)

Singles from Súper Sangre Joven
- 1. "Hitboy" Released: 5 June 2019; 2. "Goteo" Released: 7 August 2019; 3. "A Punta de Espada" Released: 17 October 2019; 4. "Te Traje Flores" Released: 31 October 2019

Súper Sangre Joven (transl. "Super Young Blood") is the debut studio album by Argentine rapper Duki.

The album was produced mainly by the Argentine group of producers NEUEN, which is made up of Oniria, Yesan and Ferla Flame, the rest of the songs were produced by Sky, Asan, El Sidechain and Fnxty. Súper Sangre Joven was released on 1 November 2019 via SSJ Records in association with Dale Play Records. The songs were posted on Duki's YouTube channel one day before their release. The album contains collaborations with artists such as C. Tangana, Khea, Leebrian, Alemán, Ysy A, Marcianos Crew, Lucho SSJ, Eladio Carrión and Sfera Ebbasta.

== Background and composition ==
On 17 January 2018, Duki announced on Twitter that his first album would be released in February. Although it suffered an uncommunicated delay, in an interview in July, he announced its release date for 2019. Oniria, one of the album's producers, said the release would be mid-year. Finally, in an Instagram live, he announced the "definitive" date for mid-October, only to delay again and release it on 1 November. In Súper Sangre Joven, Duki talks about drugs, sex, love and the success he's having in his career. The first single to be released was "Hitboy" with Argentine rapper Khea, it was released on 5 June 2019. The second single to be released was "Goteo" on 7 August 2019. The third single "A Punta de Espada" with Argentine rapper Ysy A was released on 17 October 2019. The fourth single "Te Traje Flores" was released on 31 October 2019.

== Track listing ==
All tracks was written by Duki.

Súper Sangre Joven track listing
No.	Title	Writer(s)	Producer(s)	Length
1.	"Te Traje Flores (I Brought You Flowers)"	Mauro Lombardo	NEUEN	2:13
2.	"It's a Vibe" (with C. Tangana and Khea featuring Leebrian)	Lombardo; Antón Álvarez; Ivo Serue; Leebrian Canales	Sky	3:41
3.	"Hitboy" (with Khea)	Lombardo; Serue	Asan	2:59
4.	"Señorita (Lady)"	Lombardo	NEUEN	2:42
5.	"Me Gusta lo Simple (I Like the Simple)" (with Alemán)	Lombardo; Erik Alemán	NEUEN; Fntxy	3:17
6.	"Perdón (Sorry)"	Lombardo	NEUEN; El Sidechain	3:39
7.	"A Punta de Espada (At the Point of the Sword)" (with Ysy A)	Lombardo; Alejo Acosta	NEUEN	3:23
8.	"La Jefatura (The Leadership)" (with Marcianos Crew and Lucho SSJ)	Lombardo; Sergio Grasso; Luciano Vega	NEUEN	3:32
9.	"One Millon Dollar Baby" (featuring Eladio Carrión and Sfera Ebbasta)	Lombardo; Gionata Boschetti; Eladio Carrión	NEUEN	4:41
10.	"Goteo"	Lombardo	Asan	2:45
Total length:				32:32

== Personnel ==
Credits retrieved from AllMusic.

Primary artist

- Duki – lead vocals, songwriter

Additional musicians

- C. Tangana – vocals (track 2)
- Khea – vocals (track 2, 3)
- Leebrian – vocals (track 2)
- Alemán – vocals (track 5)
- Ysy A – vocals (track 7)
- Marcianos Crew – vocals (track 8)
- Lucho SSJ – vocals (track 8)
- Eladio Carrión – vocals (track 9)
- Sfera Ebbasta – vocals (track 9)

Production

- NEUEN (Oniria, Yesan and Feria Flame) – producer (track 1, 4 – 9)
- Sky – producer (track 2)
- Asan – producer (track 3, 10)
- Fnxty – co-producer (track 5)
- El Sidechain – mixing, co-producer (track 6)

== Charts ==
Chart (2019)	Peak position
Spanish Albums (PROMUSICAE)	12

== Certifications ==
Region	Certification	Certified units/sales
Argentina (CAPIF)	Platinum	20,000^{^}
^{^} Shipments figures based on certification alone.
