= Fraile Pintado =

Coordinates: 23°56′S 64°47′W

- Municipality and town
- Interactive map of Fraile Pintado
- Country: Argentina
- Province: Jujuy Province
- Time zone: UTC−3 (ART)

Fraile Pintado is a town and municipality in Jujuy Province in Argentina.

== Climate ==
Climate data for Fraile Pintado (1935–1990)
Month	Jan	Feb	Mar	Apr	May	Jun	Jul	Aug	Sep	Oct	Nov	Dec	Year
Daily mean °C (°F)	25.4 (77.7)	24.5 (76.1)	23.0 (73.4)	19.9 (67.8)	17.2 (63.0)	14.1 (57.4)	13.9 (57.0)	15.8 (60.4)	18.5 (65.3)	22.1 (71.8)	23.8 (74.8)	25.1 (77.2)	20.3 (68.5)
Average precipitation mm (inches)	171 (6.7)	156 (6.1)	156 (6.1)	69 (2.7)	17 (0.7)	7 (0.3)	5 (0.2)	4 (0.2)	4 (0.2)	24 (0.9)	66 (2.6)	105 (4.1)	784 (30.9)
Source: Instituto Nacional de Tecnología Agropecuaria
