= Goteo (song) =

Single by Duki

from the album Súper Sangre Joven
- Released: August 7, 2019
- Genre: Rap
- Length: 2:45
- Label: SSJ; Dale Play
- Songwriter: Mauro Ezequiel Lombardo
- Producer: Asan

Duki singles chronology
"Sol y Luna" (2019)	"Goteo" (2019)	"Goteo (El Paredón Live Session)" (2019)

Music video
- "Goteo" on YouTube

"Goteo" is a song by Argentine rapper Duki. It was released on August 6, 2019. The music video for the song has more than 100 million views on YouTube. The song has over 160 million plays on Spotify. In 2020 the song was nominated for 21st Annual Latin Grammy Awards in the category Best Rap/Hip-Hop Song.

== Background ==
The song was produced by Asan, the video for the song was directed by Dano and recorded by Zazo Canvas, Nico Leonardo and Dano. The video was recorded in Barcelona when Duki performed at the Razzmatazz in 2019.

== Remix ==
The remix of the song was released on January 23, 2020 that features the participation of C.R.O, Ronny J, Capo Plaza and Pablo Chill-E. The remix of the song was nominated in 2020 for the Gardel Awards in the category "Best Urban/Trap Musical Collaboration".

== Personnel ==
Primary artist

- Duki — lead vocals

Additional personnel

- Asan — producer
- El Sidechain — mixing

Remix version

- C.R.O — guest vocals
- Ronny J — guest vocals
- Pablo Chill-E — guest vocals
- Capo Plaza — guest vocals

== Charts ==
=== Weekly charts ===
Chart (2019)	Peak position
Argentina (Argentina Hot 100)	10
Argentina National Songs (Monitor Latino)	8
Spain (Promusicae)	5

=== Year-end charts ===
Chart (2019)	Peak position
Spain (PROMUSICAE)	68

== Certifications ==
Region	Certification	Certified units/sales
Spain (Promusicae)	3× Platinum	180,000^{‡}
^{‡} Sales+streaming figures based on certification alone.

== Awards and accolades ==
Year	Award	Category	Result	Ref.
2020	21st Annual Latin Grammy Awards	Best Rap/Hip Hop Song	Nominated	
2021	Gardel Awards	Best Urban/Trap Musical Collaboration (for remix version)	Nominated	

== See also ==
- List of Billboard Argentina Hot 100 top-ten singles in 2019
