= Loca (Khea, Duki and Cazzu song) =

2017 single by Khea, Duki and Cazzu

Single by Khea, Duki and Cazzu
- Language: Spanish
- Released: November 20, 2017
- Genre: Latin trap
- Length: 4:08
- Label: Mueva
- Songwriters: Ivo Alfredo Thomas Serue; Mauro Ezequiel Lombardo; Julieta Emilia Cazzuchelli; Micaela Ailén Gonzáles De La Mata; Omar Franco Varela
- Producers: Omar Varela; Mykka

Khea singles chronology
"She Don't Give a Fo" (2017)	"Loca" (2017)	"Vete" (2017)

Duki singles chronology
"She Don't Give a Fo" (2017)	"Loca" (2017)	"Rockstar" (2017)

Cazzu singles chronology
"Fantasías" (2017)	"Loca" (2017)	"C14TORCE" (2018)

Music video
- "Loca" on YouTube

"Loca" (transl. "Crazy") is a song by Argentine rappers Khea, Duki and Cazzu. It was released on November 20, 2017.

== Background ==
The song was produced by Omar Varela and Mykka, the video for the song was directed by Ballve. The song was a trend in various parts of Latin America and Spain and ranked 3 in Argentina. On April 15, 2019, the song was certified Latin Gold by the RIAA.

== Personnel ==
- Khea – lead vocals
- Duki – guest vocals
- Cazzu – guest vocals
- Omar Varela – producer
- Mykka – producer

== Bad Bunny remix ==
"Loca (remix)"

Single by Khea, Bad Bunny, Duki and Cazzu
- Language: Spanish
- Released: March 18, 2018
- Genre: Latin trap
- Length: 5:18
- Label: Mueva; Rimas
- Songwriters: Ivo Alfredo Thomás Serue; Benito Martínez; Mauro Ezequiel Lombardo; Julieta Emilia Cazzuchelli; Micaela Ailén Gonzáles de la Mata; Omar Franco Varela
- Producers: Omar Varela; Mykka

Khea singles chronology
"Vete" (2017)	"Loca (remix)" (2018)	"Como Le Digo" (2018)

Bad Bunny singles chronology
"Dime Si Te Acuerdas" (2018)	"Loca (remix)" (2018)	"Dime" (2018)

Duki singles chronology
"Quavo" (2018)	"Loca (remix)" (2018)	"Guapo" (2018)

Cazzu singles chronology
"C14TORCE" (2018)	"Loca (remix)" (2018)	"R.I.P" (2018)

Music video
- "Loca" (remix) on YouTube

The remix of the song was released on March 16, 2018, and features the Puerto Rican rapper Bad Bunny.

== Charts ==
=== Monthly and weekly ===
Chart (2017–2018)	Peak position
Argentina Digital Songs (CAPIF)	3
Nicaragua (Monitor Latino)	9
Spain (Promusicae) Remix version	65
US Hot Latin Songs (Billboard) Remix version	45

=== Year-end charts ===
Chart (2018)	Position
Nicaragua (Monitor Latino)	62

== Certifications ==
Region	Certification	Certified units/sales
Spain (Promusicae)	Gold	30,000^{‡}
United States (RIAA)	Gold (Latin)	30,000^{‡}
Spain (Promusicae) Remix version	Platinum	60,000^{‡}
United States (RIAA) Remix version	Gold (Latin)	30,000^{‡}
^{‡} Sales+streaming figures based on certification alone.
