= Khea =

Argentine rapper (born 2000)

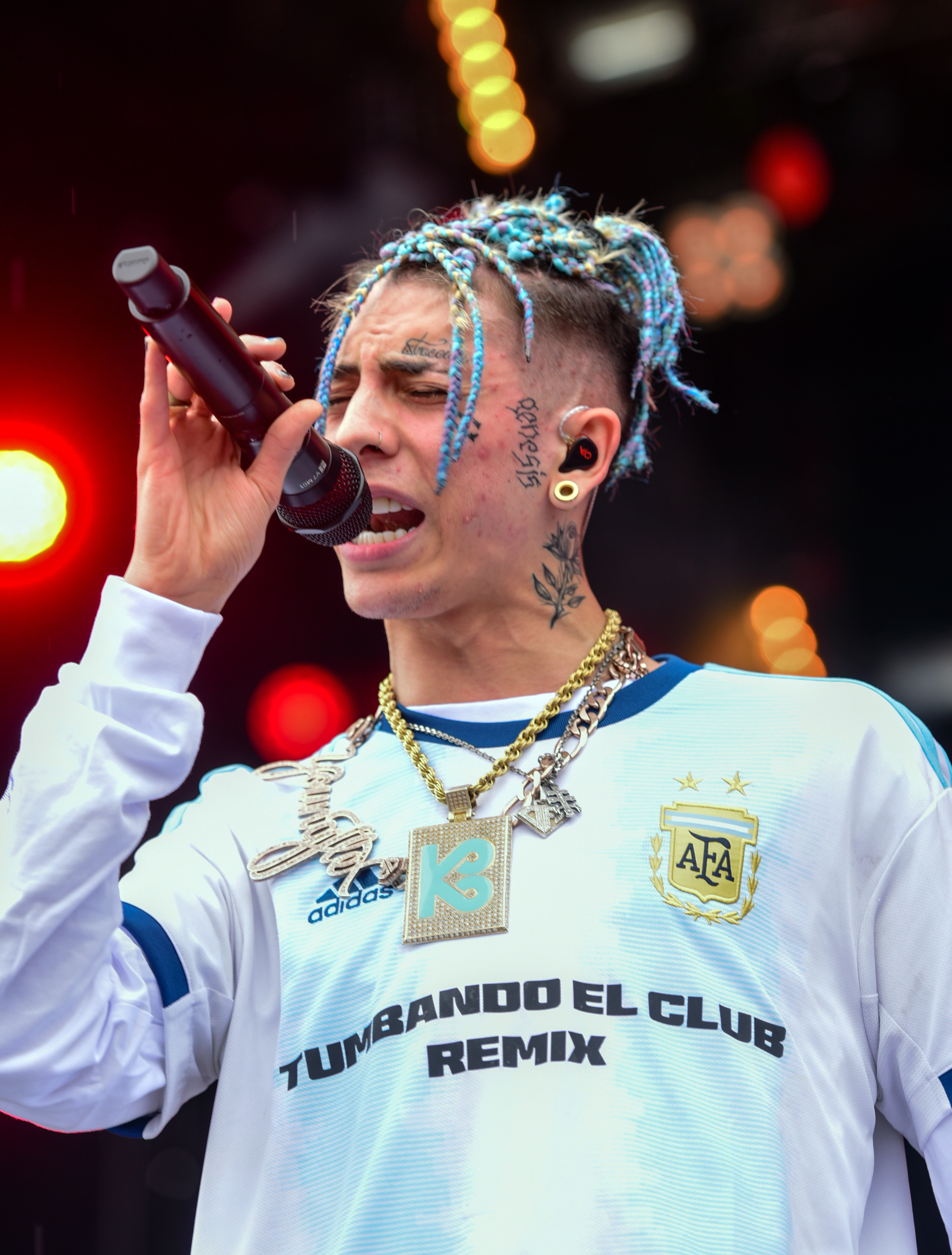
- Khea in 2019

Background information
- Born: Ivo Alfredo Thomas Serue; 13 April 2000 (age 25); Virreyes, Buenos Aires, Argentina
- Genres: Latin trap; Latin hip-hop
- Occupations: Rapper; singer; songwriter
- Years active: 2017–present
- Labels: Mueva; Young Flex; Interscope

Ivo Alfredo Thomas Serue (born 13 April 2000), known by his stage name Khea, is an Argentine rapper and singer. He is a member of the Argentine Latin trap scene along with artists such as Cazzu and Duki.

== Early years ==
Ivo Alfredo Thomás Serue was born on 13 April 2000 in Virreyes, Buenos Aires. Ivo grew up influenced by pop music and the music his mother listened to, pointing to Canadian singer Justin Bieber and the Spanish rock and rumba band Estopa as his biggest influences.

When Ivo was 15 years old, he began to battle in small freestyle competitions against rappers like Midel, changing his stage name to Khea.

== Career ==
Khea is a star in the Argentine trap scene. His lyrics usually focus on romance and sex. He has collaborated with artist such as Midel, JD Pantoja, Bad Bunny, Tini, Cazzu, Duki, Tali Goya, Brytiago, OneRepublic, Blackbear, Natti Natasha, Prince Royce and others. He gained fame with the song "Loca" with Cazzu and Duki, which gained 400 million views on YouTube. He did a remix with Bad Bunny. In 2020 he collaborated with bachata guitarist / producer Lenny Santos from Aventura on the song "Ayer Me Llamó Mi Ex". In 2020 he became the most listened to artist in Argentina, reaching 10 million monthly listeners on Spotify.

== Discography ==
=== Studio albums ===
List of albums, with selected chart positions
Title	album details	Peak chart positions
Title	album details	SPA
Serotonina	Released: 26 May 2023; Label: Young Flex, Interscope; Formats: Digital download, streaming	40

=== Extended plays ===
List of extended plays, with selected chart positions
Title	extended play details	Peak chart positions
Title	extended play details	SPA
Tarot: Del Cielo al Infierno	Released: 14 August 2025; Label: Young Flex, Interscope; Formats: Digital download, streaming	—

=== Mixtapes ===
List of mixtapes, with selected chart positions
Title	mixtape details	Peak chart positions
Title	mixtape details	SPA
Ave María	Released: 21 April 2018; Label: Mueva, Rimas; Formats: Digital download, streaming	—
Trapicheo	Released: 15 May 2020; Label: Young Flex, Interscope; Formats: Digital download, streaming	64
"—" denotes a recording that did not chart or was not released in that territory.

=== Singles ===
==== As lead artist ====
List of singles as lead artist, with selected chart positions, showing year released, certifications and album name
Title	Year	Peak chart positions								Certifications	Album
Title	Year	ARG	ECU	MEX	NIC	PAR	SPA	URU	US Latin	Certifications	Album
"B.U.H.O" (with Midel and Arse featuring Duki and Klave)	2017	—	—	—	—	—	—	—	—		Non-album single
"Millonario" (with Arse and Midel)	2017	—	—	—	—	—	—	—	—		Ave María
"A Lo Halloween" (with Midel, Arse and Iacho)	2017	—	—	—	—	—	—	—	—		Non-album single
"Loca" (with Duki and Cazzu)	2017	3	—	—	9	—	—	—	—	RIAA: Gold (Latin)	Ave María
"Vete"	2017	7	—	—	—	—	—	—	—		Ave María
"Rebota" (with Ecko, Seven Kayne and Iacho)	2018	—	—	—	—	—	—	—	—		Non-album single
"Loca" (remix) (with Bad Bunny, Duki and Cazzu)	2018	—	—	—	—	—	65	—	45	RIAA: Gold (Latin)	Ave María
"Como Le Digo"	2018	—	—	—	—	—	—	—	—		Ave María
"Mi Cubana (Remix)" (with Eladio Carrión, Cazzu and Ecko)	2018	—	—	—	—	—	—	—	—		Non-album single
"Ave María" (with Eladio Carrión, Big Soto and Randy)	2018	—	—	—	—	—	—	—	—		Ave María
"Calentita" (featuring Brytiago)	2018	—	—	—	—	—	—	—	—		Non-album singles
"M.I.A" (with Omar Varela)	2018	—	—	—	—	—	—	—	—		Non-album singles
"S.A.D"	2018	—	—	—	—	—	—	—	—		Non-album singles
"RedTube (Remix)" (with Sander Wazz and Ecko)	2018	—	—	—	—	—	—	—	—		Non-album singles
"Otra Botella" (with Neo Pistea and Omar Varela)	2018	61	—	—	—	—	—	—	—		Non-album singles
"Me Usaste" (with Eladio Carrión, Noriel, Jon Z, Ecko and Juhn)	2018	48	—	—	—	—	—	—	—	RIAA: Gold (Latin)	Non-album singles
"Realidad"	2018	—	—	—	—	—	—	—	—		Non-album singles
"Pa Tu Casa" (with Kevin Roldán and Rauw Alejandro)	2018	—	—	—	—	—	—	—	—		Non-album singles
"Empresario" (featuring Yung Pinch)	2018	—	—	—	—	—	—	—	—		Non-album singles
"Se Motiva" (with JD Pantoja)	2018	—	—	—	—	—	—	—	—		Non-album singles
"Screenshot"	2018	—	—	—	—	—	—	—	—		Non-album singles
"Loco" (with GS, Alexis Chaires, Kyke and Smoky)	2019	—	—	—	—	—	—	—	—		Non-album singles
"Sola" (featuring Myke Towers, Dayme y El High and Alex Rose)	2019	—	—	—	—	—	—	12	—		Non-album singles
"Hitboy" (with Duki)	2019	22	—	—	—	—	—	—	—		Súper Sangre Joven
"Tengo 30" (featuring Duki, Cazzu, Neo Pistea and Tali Goya)	2019	45	—	—	—	—	—	—	—		Non-album singles
"Ánimo" (featuring Duki and Midel)	2019	83	—	—	—	—	—	—	—		Non-album singles
"Dónde Estas"	2020	45	—	—	—	—	64	—	—	PROMUSICAE: Gold; RIAA: Gold (Latin)	Non-album singles
"Creo Que" (featuring Asan)	2020	—	—	—	—	—	—	—	—		Trapicheo
"Mami Lo Siento"	2020	—	—	—	—	—	—	—	—		Non-album singles
"Dónde Estás (Remix)" (with Piso 21)	2020	45	—	—	—	27	—	—	—		Non-album singles
"Ella Dice" (with Tini)	2020	4	8	3	—	41	—	8	—	CAPIF: Gold	Tini Tini Tini
"Ayer Me Llamó Mi Ex" (featuring Lenny Santos)	2020	6	—	—	—	27	2	—	—	PROMUSICAE: 3× Platinum; RIAA: 3× Platinum (Latin)	Non-album singles
"Khea: Bzrp Music Sessions, Vol. 34" (with Bizarrap)	2020	24	—	—	—	—	48	—	—		Non-album singles
"Otra Vez" (with Diablo)	2020	—	—	—	—	—	—	—	—		Non-album singles
"Sigue Sola" (with Juhn, Montano and Totoy El Frío featuring Jerry Di and Beéle)	2020	—	—	—	—	—	—	—	—		Non-album singles
"Ayer Me Llamó Mi Ex" (remix) (with Natti Natasha and Prince Royce featuring Lenny Santos)	2020	5	—	—	—	94	—	—	33		Non-album singles
"Sacanagem" (with DJ Zullu and Preto Show)	2020	—	—	—	—	—	—	—	—		Non-album singles
"Keloke"	2020	—	—	—	—	—	—	—	—		Non-album singles
"100 Remix (Lado B)" (with Miky Woodz, Omy de Oro, Kevvo and Ñengo Flow featuring Los G4)	2020	—	—	—	—	—	—	—	—		Non-album singles
"Que Paso?" (with Bhavi)	2021	—	—	—	—	—	—	—	—		Cinema
"Tu msj"	2021	—	—	—	—	—	—	—	—		Non-album singles
"Además de Mi (Remix)" (with Rusherking and Duki featuring Lit Killah, Tiago PZK and María Becerra)	2021	1	—	—	—	44	42	—	—	CAPIF: 3× Platinum; PROMUSICAE: Gold	Non-album singles
"Judas" (with Bad Gyal)	2021	—	—	—	—	—	44	—	—		Warm Up
"Wacha" (with Duki)	2021	3	—	—	—	—	52	17	—		Non-album singles
"Te Necesito" (with María Becerra)	2021	3	—	—	—	82	—	— (Note: "Te Necesito" did not enter the Monitor Latino Uruguay chart, but peaked at number 9 on the Cámara Uruguaya del Disco chart.)	—		Non-album singles
"Vlone" (with Polima Westcoast)	2021	—	—	—	—	—	—	—	—		Non-album singles
"Medio Crazy" (with Nobeat)	2021	—	—	—	—	—	—	—	—		Non-album singles
"Culo" (with Lola Índigo)	2021	—	—	—	—	—	95	—	—		La Niña
"Only One" (with Julia Michaels and Becky G featuring Di Genius)	2021	—	—	—	—	—	—	—	—		Non-album singles
"Bien Chula"	2021	69	—	—	—	—	—	—	—		Non-album singles
"Alcancía" (with Llane and Reik)	2022										Fino
"Remember Me" (with Duki and Bizarrap)	2023	—	—	—	—	—	49	—	—		Non-album single
"—" denotes a recording that did not chart or was not released in that territory.

==== As featured artist ====
List of singles as featured artist, with selected chart positions, showing year released, certifications and album name
Title	Year	Peak chart positions										Certifications	Album
Title	Year	ARG	COL	ECU	ITA	MEX	NIC	PAR	PER	SPA	US Latin	Certifications	Album
"She Don't Give a FO" (Duki featuring Khea)	2017	7	—	—	—	—	—	—	—	39	—	PROMUSICAE: 5× Platinum	Non-album singles
"Muévelo Mami" (Iacho featuring Khea and Seven Kayne)	2017	—	—	—	—	—	—	—	—	—	—		Ave María
"Pa' Saber Amar" (Marko Silva featuring Khea)	2018	—	—	—	—	—	—	—	—	—	—		Ave María
"Lumbre" (MC Davo featuring Khea)	2018	—	—	—	—	—	—	—	—	—	—		Non-album singles
"No Lo Entiendo" (Bhavi featuring Khea)	2019	—	—	—	—	—	—	—	—	—	—		Non-album singles
"Pa Mi (Remix)" (Dalex and Rafa Pabön featuring Feid, Khea, Sech, Cazzu and Lenny Távarez)	2019	3	29	16	78	4	3	2	6	6	20	PROMUSICAE: 4× Platinum; RIAA: 19× Platinum (Latin)	Climax
"Makina de Armado" (Duki featuring Khea and Neo Pistea)	2019	—	—	—	—	—	—	—	—	—	—		Non-album singles
"Buenos Aires" (Seven Kayne featuring Bhavi and Khea)	2019	—	—	—	—	—	—	—	—	—	—		Non-album singles
"Tumbando El Club (Remix)" (Neo Pistea featuring C.R.O, Obiewanshot, Ysy A, Cazzu, Khea, Lucho SSJ, Coqeéin Montana, Marcianos Crew and Duki)	2019	3	—	—	—	—	—	—	—	—	—	CAPIF: Platinum; AMPROFON: Gold	Non-album singles
"Hot Girl Bummer (Remix)" (Blackbear featuring Khea)	2019	—	—	—	—	—	—	—	—	—	—		Non-album singles
"Better Days – Mejores Días (Remix)" (OneRepublic featuring Khea)	2020	—	—	—	—	—	—	—	—	—	—		Non-album singles
"Pa Los Gustos Los Colores (Remix)" (Javiielo featuring Khea, Omy de Oro and Nekxum)	2020	—	—	—	—	—	—	—	—	—	—		Non-album singles
"Mood" (Rita Ora and Imanbek featuring Khea)	2021	—	—	—	—	—	—	—	—	—	—		Bang
"Sexy" (Eich featuring Khea and Duki)	2021	—	—	—	—	—	—	—	—	—	—		Non-album single
"Déjame Tranki" (Lit Killah featuring Khea)	2021	26	—	—	—	—	—	—	—	—	—		MAWZ
"—" denotes a recording that did not chart or was not released in that territory.

== Videography ==
List of music videos, showing year released and director
Title	Year	Director(s)	Album
"B.U.H.O (with Midel and Arse feat. Duki, Klave)"	2017	Bizcarrita	Non-album singles
"Millonario" (with Midel and Arse)	2017	EME	Ave María
"Loca" (with Duki and Cazzu)	2017	Ballve	Ave María
"Vete"	2017	Ballve	Ave María
"Como Le Digo"	2018	Ferian	Ave María
"Ave María" (with Eladio Carrión, Big Soto and Randy)	2018	EME	Ave María
"Calentita" (feat. Brytiago)	2018	EME	Non-album singles
"M.I.A" (with Omar Varela)	2018	Conga Studio	Non-album singles
"S.A.D"	2018	Bizcarrita	Non-album singles
"Otra Botella" (with Neo Pistea and Omar Varela)	2018	Ofroho	Non-album singles
"Me Usaste" (with Eladio Carrión, Jon Z, Noriel, Ecko and Juhn)	2018	Never Broke Films	Non-album singles
"Realidad"	2018	Ferian	Non-album singles
"Pa Tu Casa" (with Kevin Roldán and Rauw Alejandro)	2018	Nael and Justin	Non-album singles
"Empresario" (feat. Yung Pinch)	2018	Ferian	Non-album singles
"Se Motiva" (with JD Pantoja)	2018	Safari Films	Non-album singles
"Screenshot"	2018	Entre Familia Films	Non-album singles
"Sola" (feat. Myke Towers, Alex Rose and Dayme y El High)	2019	Rueda Films	Non-album singles
"Hitboy" (with Duki)	2019	Ballve	Súper Sangre Joven
"Ánimo" (feat. Duki and Midel)	2019	Ballve	Non-album singles
"Dónde Estás"	2020	Alvaro Stocker	Non-album singles
"Creo Que" (feat. Asan)	2020	Gelege and Gastón Herrera	Trapicheo
"Mami Lo Siento"	2020	Tremoo Team	Non-album singles
"Ella Dice" (with Tini)	2020	Diego Peskins and Nuno Gomes	Tini Tini Tini
"Ayer Me Llamó Mi Ex" (featuring Lenny Santos)	2020	Ballve	Non-album singles
"Khea: Bzrp Music Sessions Vol. 34" (with Bizarrap)	2020	Glyfe	Non-album singles
"Otra Vez" (with Diablo)	2020	Santiago Perfecto	Non-album singles
"Ayer Me Llamó Mi Ex" (remix) (with Natti Natasha and Prince Royce featuring Lenny Santos)	2020	Teo	Non-album singles
"Keloke"	2020	Ballve	Non-album singles
