= Ovi (rapper) =

Cuban rapper

- Also known as: "El Asere de aseres"; "El orgullo de Cuba"
- Born: Ovidio Crespo Retureta; 10 October 1995 (age 31); Ciego de Ávila, Cuba
- Genres: Reggaetón; corridos tumbados; Latin trap
- Occupations: Rapper; singer
- Instrument: Vocals
- Label: Rancho Humilde

Ovidio Crespo Retureta (born October 10, 1995), better known by his stage name, Ovi, is a Cuban rapper and singer of corrido, reggaetón and Latin trap. He is part of the Rancho Humilde label and has collaborated with artists such as Snoop Dogg, Natanael Cano, Junior H, and Snow Tha Product.

== Biography ==
Crespo was born in Ciego de Ávila, Cuba. At an early age, he was interested in music, starting a musical group with his friends while in school. In Cuba, he studied at the University of Medical Sciences of Havana, but stopped due to financial problems. After leaving Cuba at the age of 20 to pursue opportunity, he later settled in the United States in Miami, Florida. His arrival was met with financial struggles as he worked as a kitchen assistant. He suffered with substance abuse which he managed to recover from. Arriving from Arizona to Los Angeles, he met with the Rancho Humilde record label, which opened an opportunity for him to be part of it.

In 2024, Ovi was detained by ICE in Miami after a traffic confrontation with another driver. He received a pardon from being deported back to Cuba after fighting the case.

== Career ==
In 2019, he released the singles "Se Me Dino" and "Bailen" under the record label Rancho Humilde, which he joined. After releasing the single "Cuando Me Ve" with Mexican singer Adriel Favela, he began to gain notoriety. Then a few months later, the premiere of "Yo ya lo enrolé" with Natanael Cano became a success in several Latin American countries, especially in Mexico. In May of the same year, he released the single "Nadie como tú" with Carolina Ross, which reached millions of views on YouTube. On March 19, 2020, Mexican rapper Natanael Cano premiered in collaboration with Ovi the single "Pacas Verdes", gaining over 20 million views on YouTube in one month. The song caught the attention of rapper Bad Bunny, who congratulated them for the initiative to include the corridos style. On April 20, Ovi released his first studio album titled Amen that includes collaborations with Gera MX, Junior H, and Natanael Cano.

A month later, he released the song "Vengo de nada" with Natanael Cano, Alemán and Big Soto, which made the Billboard Hot Latin Songs chart in the United States. In October, he released the album Buen viaje, which includes songs produced by Teejay, Young Hollywood, Krizous and Junior H. The album makes references to the film Scarface, the program Caso Cerrado and the song "Umbrella" by Rihanna.

In December 2020, he published his third studio album Las 3 Torres, with features from Natanael Cano and Junior H.

=== Studio albums ===
- Amen (2020)
- Buen Viaje (2020)
- Retumban2 (2021)
- Asere de Aseres (2024)

=== Collaborative albums ===
- Las 3 Torres (with Natanael Cano and Junior H) (2020)
