= Duki (rapper) =

Argentine rapper

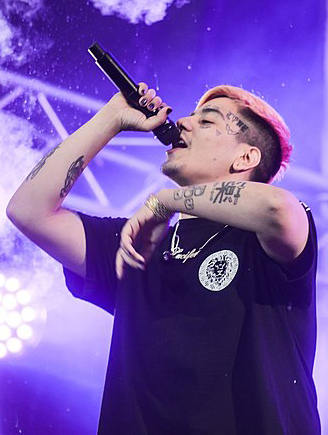
- Duki in 2019
- Born: Mauro Ezequiel Lombardo (Note: Duki's birth name has sometimes been erroneously reported as Mauro Ezequiel Lombardo Quiroga. He has clarified that his full birth name is Mauro Ezequiel Lombardo with no second surname in accordance with Argentine customs.); 24 June 1996 (age 30); Almagro, Buenos Aires, Argentina
- Occupations: Rapper; singer; songwriter
- Years active: 2016–present
- Works: Discography
- Musical career
- Genres: Latin trap; pop rap; Latin hip-hop; freestyle rap; reggaeton
- Labels: Mueva; SSJ; Dale Play
- Website: duki.com.ar

Mauro Ezequiel Lombardo (born 24 June 1996), known professionally as Duki, is an Argentine rapper, singer and songwriter. He is the lead voice of Latin trap in Argentina, thanks to his multiple hits with his singles and his particular style of voice and staging.

Duki began to gain recognition for his appearances in rap battles, such as El Quinto Escalón, which was one of the most important in Argentina, created by rapper Ysy A, and where he obtained his first share of popularity when he won it in 2016. He could record his first single, "No Vendo Trap", to pursue a musical career thanks to his victory. He then released the singles "She Don't Give a Fo" and "Hello Cotto", which garnered him multiple views on YouTube and earned Lombardo a massive following in his home country. In 2018, he formed an important musical trio for the Argentine trap, named Modo Diablo, with artists YSY A and Neo Pistea. He then released his debut studio album, Súper Sangre Joven (2019), with the lead single "Goteo" being nominated for Best Rap/Hip Hop Song at the 21st Latin Grammy Awards. In 2020, he collaborated on Bad Bunny's album YHLQMDLG in the single "Hablamos Mañana", which was also nominated in the Latin Grammys for Best Urban Fusion/Performance. In 2021, Duki released his second album, Desde el Fin del Mundo, which reached number one in digital albums in Argentina.

== Early life ==
Mauro Ezequiel Lombardo was born on 24 June 1996, in Almagro, Buenos Aires. Son of lawyer Sandra Viviana Quiroga and graphic designer Guillermo Luis Lombardo, he has two siblings, Nahuel, a sound engineer, and Candela. Raised in La Paternal, he had a solid musical influence thanks to his parents, who listened to Argentine rock, salsa, disco and Latin pop. His mother was a follower of artist Alejandro Sanz, and his father was a fan of bands Queen and Virus. On the other side, his brother Nahuel was a fan of Charly García and Luis Alberto Spinetta. During his early teens, Lombardo started to gain interest in punk rock, being a strong listener of Linkin Park, and hip-hop, thanks to Eminem and 50 Cent, which lead him to eventually start watching rap battles, which had an important underground following in Argentina.

Influenced by long-time Argentine rappers Kódigo and Tata, he started practicing freestyle with his best friends, which allowed him to gain confidence to start participating in battle competitions. Alongside this, he dropped out of high school due to his poor grades.

== Career ==
=== 2013-2016: Early years and success in rap battles ===
Duki participated in his first rap battle in 2013, in which he became victorious. He described it years later as "catastrophic, it was raining, but we ended up winning". During this time, he formed a rap crew called Atuanorinos Tripulación, and participated in a lot of famous underground rap competitions, such as Las Vegas Freestyle or Madero Free.

Around 2015, he appeared for the first time in El Quinto Escalón, a competition celebrated in Parque Rivadavia, a very centric park in Buenos Aires. This allowed the competition to become recognized very quickly, with a lot of young rappers starting to rise to a massive following, such as Paulo Londra, Lit Killah, or Trueno. Duki became one of the most praised and recognized MC's due to his flow and strong staging. In 2016 he won it for the first time, beating rapper Nacho in the final. The prize was a session in a music studio to record a single. Duki recorded his first single, "No Vendo Trap", in November 2016. The official video was uploaded on YouTube, gaining two million views in just two weeks. Due to the song's success, the sample producer, Pa$ha, decided to strike the video for copyright, and the platform took the video down. This did not stop Duki from recording more singles that led him to gain a massive fan base, mostly coming from his battle days.

=== 2017-2018: First breakthrough singles and Modo Diablo ===
In late 2016 and early 2017, Duki continued to appear in El Quinto Escalón, now one of the most important competitions in Argentina and South America. Several of Duki's battles, along with his partner MKS, gained many views on YouTube, some becoming the most viewed battles in Spanish history. Thanks to his increasing fame, Duki was signed to Mueva Records and released the singles "She Don't Give a Fo" and "Hello Cotto" with producer Omar Varela to launch his music career. The first one was certified gold by Spain's PROMUSICAE, and both singles surpassed a 100 million views on YouTube, establishing Duki as one of the most promising trap artists in Argentina. Two weeks later, he participated in Khea's single "Loca", with rappers Cazzu and Bad Bunny, which ranked 45 in the Hot Latin Songs chart and went gold by the RIAA.

In 2018, Duki formed a trap trio with YSY A, the host of El Quinto Escalón, and Neo Pistea, another promising trap artist in Argentina. The trio published the singles "Quavo" and "Trap N' Export", gaining a lot of views on YouTube. In March they performed in the Teatro Gran Rex, which was sold out. During May, Duki performed his single "Rockstar" with a live orchestra at the Premios Gardel, a performance that received a harsh critical reception, with artist Charly Garcia saying during his acceptance speech that "autotune should be banned". However, Duki didn't mind Garcia's criticism, stating that "he could say I'm a scumbag and I'd be happy anyway. I love him, I went to one of his concerts when I was younger. I respect him so much that I didn't even respond to him."

During this year, Duki continued to release singles to reach further popularity. His singles "Si Te Sentís Sola" and "Hijo de la Noche" reached the top-10 of the Argentine rankings. However, during this time, Duki began to have anxiety attacks, and started a drug dependency, while living in residence called La Mansión with the other members of Modo Diablo. Duki decided to leave the house, and was helped by his family to recover. At the end of the year, Lombardo refused to sign with Sony and Universal, and was part of the jury of the Red Bull Batalla de Gallos contest, held in Argentina and won by fellow rapper Wos. He was also the cover of Rolling Stone Argentina. In December 2018 he released the single "Sin Culpa" with singer DrefQuila, that peaked at the sixth position of the Billboard Argentina Hot 100, the highest position reached so far by Lombardo.

=== 2019: "Goteo" and Súper Sangre Joven ===
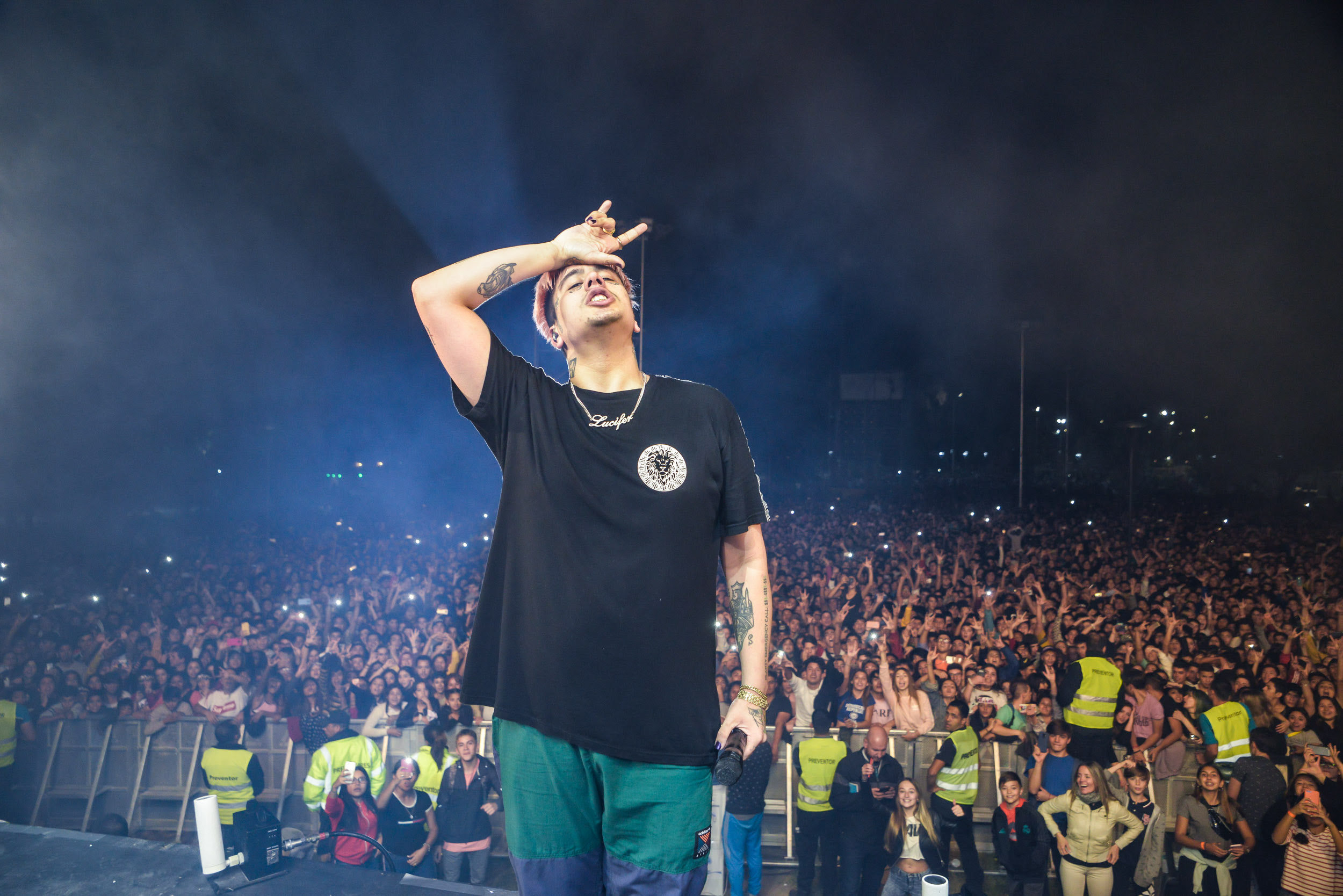
Duki at a concert in 2019.

During the summer of 2019, Modo Diablo split due to the artists wanting to launch solo careers. In February, Duki participated in the first Argentine trap festival, Buenos Aires Trap, which featured appearances by Bad Bunny, Cazzu, and Khea. In March, Duki was part of the mega-collaboration in the Neo Pistea's remix single "Tumbando el Club", which peaked at number 3 in Argentina Hot 100. In June, he made the official soundtrack of the third season of series El marginal, with artist Vicentico.

On 6 August, Duki released the single "Goteo", which reached the 10th position in the Argentine Hot 100, remaining for three months in the chart. It also reached the top-10 in Spain, with Duki touring there and selling out every show. The tour video was later part of the official video for "Goteo". This song would end up being part of Duki's debut studio album, Súper Sangre Joven, with other tracks such as "Hitboy" (with Khea), "Te Traje Flores" and "A Punta de Espada" reaching into the Argentina Hot 100 chart. The album featured guest appearances from Khea, C. Tangana, Alemán, YSY A, Marcianos Crew, Eladio Carrión and Sfera Ebbasta, and received mixed reviews from critics, some praising Duki's versatility (the album featured various genres such as tango, Latin R&B and Latin rock) but others criticizing the album's forced composition.

In September, Duki toured the United States, with two shows in Wisconsin and New York, which had a "poor performance", said by Duki. He stated, "I performed poorly, no one knew me and I felt depressed. I insulted my crew on stage". It was at this point that Duki realized he needed to professionalize his career, so he hired family members to form a team. He also created his record label, SSJ Records. At the end of 2019, Duki was part of three of Argentina's ten most listened songs by Billboard 2019. In November he returned to Buenos Aires Trap, and insinuated at retiring from music on his Twitter account, criticizing the music industry.

=== 2020-2022: Desde el Fin del Mundo and Temporada de Reggaetón series ===
In 2020, Duki announced that he would focus on releasing more produced songs and fewer singles. At the beginning of the year he participated in the Bad Bunny album YHLQMDLG in the track "Hablamos Mañana", that earned a nomination for Best Urban Fusion/Performance in the 21st Latin Grammys. On 24 June, he released an EP named 24 to celebrate his birthday, which contained eight songs, and featured the stellar participation of U.S. rapper Juicy J. During October, he released a series of interviews in YouTube called Fideos con Duko, in which Duki interviewed several artists from Argentina, and his mother as a special for Mother's Day in Argentina. During late 2020 Duki announced that he would travel to United States to start recording his next album, set to be released in April 2021.

In January 2021, Duki released the first single from his upcoming album, titled "Muero de Fiesta este Finde", with Ca7riel. On 15 February, Duki tweeted that the album would have 18 songs. On 4 March, he participated in Rusherking and Tiago PZK's single "Además de Mí", which peaked at number one on Argentina Hot 100 chart. In 16 March Duki released the second and lead single from his next album, titled "Chico Estrella", which reached number 31 on the Argentine Hot 100. On 1 April, Duki was featured on Khea's single "Wacha", which reached number three on Argentina Hot 100, the third time the duo has entered the chart. During this month, Duki starred in a series of collaborations with the NBA on YouTube.

Desde el Fin del Mundo was released on 22 April, produced on his part by producers Asan and Yesan. The album featured a long guest list of South American artists, with Duki stating that the concept of the album was to showcase the quality of the artists from the region. Along with trap, the album experiments with genres such as electro dance, drill and punk rock. It was better received than its predecessor, with reviews praising Duki's maturation and versatility, but with others noting songs that felt a bit out of place. The album entered Spotify's Global Album Debuts chart at number three. The following week, Duki released on YouTube a concept album with visuals of the album's 18 songs, in which Duki is seen dancing and singing the album's songs in a room with all the collaborators. The tracks "Malbec", "Cascada" and "Pintao" entered in the Argentina Hot 100 chart.

In May, Duki performed a show in El Calafate, with the Perito Moreno Glacier as a background. The performance was recorded and released into a live album, Vivo Desde el Fin del Mundo, on 10 June.

After his album Desde el Fin del Mundo, he announced that he would start singing reggaeton and announced the two-EP-projects series Temporada de Reggaetón. The first installment was released on 25 November 2021 and got to the top 3 in the Top 10 Global Album Debuts of Spotify. The Latin trap moment continued throughout the year of 2022. On 20 July, Duki released his long-awaited single "Givenchy". The single served as one of the five lead singles from the second installment of Temporada de Reggaetón, titled Temporada de Reggaetón 2.

Also in 2022, Duki paired up with fellow Argentine producer and frequent collaborator Bizarrap for the volume 50 of Bzrp Music Session.

=== 2023-present: Ameri series and 5202 ===
Between 2023 and 2024, Duki released two studio albums, namely Antes de Ameri (2023) and Ameri (2024).

Duki embarked on two world tours to support the projects, the A.D.A Tour in 2024 and the Ameri World Tour in 2025. Both tours visited the US, Latin America, and Europe.

During the Ameri World Tour, Duki released two singles. The first, "Golfista", premiered at his sold-out show at the Movistar Arena in Buenos Aires on 29 May, where he also debuted the music video. The second single, "No Me Alcanza", was released on his birthday, 24 June. On social media, Duki teased that a mixtape titled 5202 could drop at any moment, it was released on 7 July with Clúster and Zell as featured artists.

== Discography ==
- Súper Sangre Joven (2019)
- Desde el Fin del Mundo (2021)
- Antes de Ameri (2023)
- Ameri (2024)
- A Veces Solo Me Diverto (2026)

== Awards and nominations ==
Year	Award	Category	Nominated work	Result	Ref.
2018	MTV Europe Music Awards	Best Latin America South Act	—	Nominated	
2018	Martín Fierro Awards	Best Musical Artist	—	Nominated	
2019	Premios Gardel	Best Urban/Trap Song or Album	"Si Te Sentís Sola"	Nominated	
2019	Premios Gardel	Best Urban/Trap Collaboration	"Sin Culpa"	Nominated	
2020	Premios Gardel	Best Urban/Trap Song or Album	"Tumbando el Club" (remix)	Nominated	
2020	Premios Gardel	Best Urban/Trap Collaboration	"Tumbando el Club" (remix)	Nominated	
2020	Latin Grammy Awards	Best Urban Fusion/Performance	"Hablamos Mañana"	Nominated	
2020	Latin Grammy Awards	Best Rap/Hip Hop Song	"Goteo"	Nominated	
2021	Premios Gardel	Best Urban/Trap Collaboration	"Goteo" (remix)	Nominated	
