= Nicki Nicole discography =

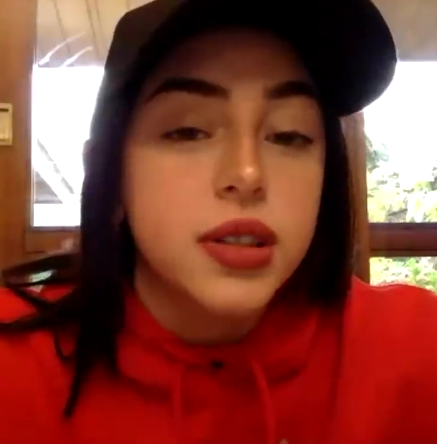
- Nicole in 2020
- Studio albums: 5
- Singles: 22
- Music videos: 21

The discography of Argentine rapper Nicki Nicole consists of four studio albums, twenty two singles and twenty one music videos. She gained popularity with her singles such as "Wapo Traketero", "Nicki Nicole: Bzrp Music Sessions, Vol. 13" with Argentine record producer Bizarrap, "Colocao", "Verte" with Argentine singer Dread Mar I and Bizarrap and "No Toque Mi Naik" with the Puerto Rican singer Lunay. Nicole participated in the song "Mamichula" alongside Argentine rapper Trueno and Argentine producer Bizarrap for Trueno's debut studio album called Atrevido. She also participated in the remix of "Ella No Es Tuya" with the Dominican rapper Rochy RD and the Puerto Rican rapper Myke Towers.

Her debut studio album Recuerdos was released on November 8, 2019, through Dale Play Records.

== Albums ==
=== Studio albums ===
List of studio albums with selected details and chart positions
| Title | Studio album details | Peaks | | Certifications |
| Title | Studio album details | SPA | US Latin Pop | Certifications |
|---|---|---|---|---|
| Recuerdos | Released: November 8, 2019; Label: Dale Play; Formats: Digital download, streaming | 81 | — | |
| Parte de Mí | Released: October 28, 2021; Labels: Dale Play, Sony Latin; Formats: CD, digital download, streaming | 12 | 13 | RIAA: Gold (Latin) |
| Alma | Released: May 18, 2023; Labels: Dale Play, Sony Latin; Formats: LP, digital download, streaming | 19 | — | AMPROFON: Gold |
| Naiki | Released: November 21, 2024; Labels: Dale Play, Sony Latin; Formats: Digital download, streaming | 39 | — | |
"—" denotes a recording that did not chart or was not released in that territory.

== Singles ==
=== As lead artist ===
List of singles as lead artist, showing selected chart positions, certifications, and associated albums
| Title | Year | Peak chart positions | | | | | | | | | | Certifications | Album |
| Title | Year | ARG | BOL | CHL | COL | MEX | PAR | PER | SPA | URU | US Latin | Certifications | Album |
|---|---|---|---|---|---|---|---|---|---|---|---|---|---|
| "Wapo Traketero" | 2019 | 49 | — | — | — | — | — | — | — | — | — | AMPROFON: Platinum+Gold | Recuerdos |
| "Nicki Nicole: Bzrp Music Sessions, Vol. 13" (with Bizarrap) | 2019 | 3 | — | — | — | — | — | — | — | — | — | AMPROFON: 4× Platinum+Gold; PROMUSICAE: Platinum | Non album single |
| "Años Luz" | 2019 | 46 | — | — | — | — | — | — | — | — | — | | Recuerdos |
| "Fucking Diablo" | 2019 | 43 | — | — | — | — | — | — | — | — | — | | Recuerdos |
| "Diva" | 2019 | 61 | — | — | — | — | — | — | — | 16 | — | | Recuerdos |
| "Colocao" | 2020 | 6 | — | — | — | — | — | — | 48 | — | — | CAPIF: 2× Platinum; AMPROFON: Platinum; PROMUSICAE: Platinum; RIAA: Gold (Latin) | Parte de Mí |
| "Mamichula" (with Trueno and Bizarrap) | 2020 | 1 | 8 | 14 | 24 | — | 79 | 4 | 1 | — | — | CAPIF: 3× Platinum; AMPROFON: 2× Platinum; CUD: 2× Platinum; IFPI CHI: Platinum; PROMUSICAE: 5× Platinum | Atrevido |
| "Mala Vida" | 2020 | 24 | — | — | — | — | — | — | 89 | — | — | CAPIF: Gold; PROMUSICAE: Gold | Parte de Mí |
| "Verte" (with Dread Mar I and Bizarrap) | 2020 | 14 | — | — | — | — | — | — | — | — | — | CAPIF: Platinum; RIAA: Gold (Latin) | Parte de Mí |
| "Ella No Es Tuya" (remix) (with Rochy RD and Myke Towers) | 2021 | 2 | 12 | — | 28 | — | 12 | 14 | 1 | — | 30 | CAPIF: 2× Platinum; PROMUSICAE: 4× Platinum; RIAA: Platinum (Latin); UNIMPRO: Gold | Non-album single |
| "Venganza" (with No Te Va Gustar) | 2021 | 39 | — | — | — | — | — | — | — | — | — | | Luz |
| "No Toque Mi Naik" (with Lunay) | 2021 | 16 | — | — | — | — | 27 | — | 52 | 15 | — (Note: "No Toque Mi Naik" did not enter the Billboard Hot Latin Songs chart, but peaked at number 11 on the Billboard Latin Pop Airplay chart. and at number 45 on the Billboard Latin Airplay chart.) | CAPIF: Platinum; RIAA: Gold (Latin) | Non-album singles |
| "Tu Fanático (Remix)" (with Pedro Capó and De La Ghetto) | 2021 | — | — | — | — | — | — | — | — | — | — | | Non-album singles |
| "Me Has Dejado" (with Delaossa) | 2021 | 43 | — | — | — | — | — | — | 32 | — | — | PROMUSICAE: Platinum | Parte de Mí |
| "Ya Me Fui" (with Bizarrap and Duki) | 2021 | 8 | — | — | — | — | 51 | — | 19 | — (Note: "YaMeFui" did not enter the Monitor Latino Uruguay chart, but peaked at number 5 on the Cámara Uruguaya del Disco chart.) | — | AMPROFON: Gold; PROMUSICAE: Platinum | Non-album single |
| "Toa La Vida" (with Mora) | 2021 | 22 | — | — | — | — | — | — | 94 | — | — | PROMUSICAE: Gold; RIAA: Gold (Latin) | Parte de Mí |
| "Parte de Mí" | 2021 | 78 | — | — | — | — | — | — | — | — | — | | Parte de Mí |
| "Baby" | 2021 | 32 | — | — | — | — | — | — | — | 9 | — | | Parte de Mí |
| "Pa Mis Muchachas" (with Christina Aguilera and Becky G featuring Nathy Peluso) | 2021 | 83 | 17 | — (Note: "Pa Mis Muchachas" did not enter the Billboard Chile Songs chart, but peaked at number eight on the Monitor Latino Chilean Top 20 Pop Airplay chart.) | — | 11 | — | 8 | 68 | — | 37 | RIAA: Platinum (Latin) | La Fuerza and Aguilera |
| "Sabe" (with Rauw Alejandro) | 2021 | 19 | — | — | — | 14 | 12 | — | 28 | 6 | — (Note: "Sabe" did not enter the Billboard Hot Latin Songs chart, but peaked at number 50 on the Billboard Latin Airplay chart.) | PROMUSICAE: Gold; RIAA: Platinum (Latin) | Parte de Mí |
| "Otra Noche" (with Los Ángeles Azules) | 2021 | 7 | — (Note: "Otra Noche" did not enter the Monitor Latino Top 20 Bolivia Airplay chart, but peaked at number 15 on the Monitor Latino Bolivia Top 20 Latin Airplay chart.) | — | — | 1 | 7 | — | — | — | 41 | AMPROFON: Platinum | Cumbia del Corazón |
| "Formentera" (with Aitana) | 2021 | 53 | 17 | — | — | — (Note: "Formentera" did not enter the Billboard Mexico Airplay chart, but peaked at number six on the Monitor Latino Mexico Top 20 Pop airplay chart.) | 66 | — | 3 | — | — | CAPIF: Gold; CUD: Platinum; PROMUSICAE: 7× Platinum | Alpha |
| "Entre Nosotros (Remix)" (with Tiago PZK, Lit Killah and María Becerra) | 2022 | 1 | 5 | 11 | — | — (Note: "Entre Nosotros (Remix)" did not enter the Billboard Mexico Airplay chart, but peaked at number 20 on the Mexico Espanol Airplay chart.) | 12 | 1 | 10 | — (Note: "Entre Nosotros (Remix)" did not enter the Monitor Latino Top 20 Uruguay airplay chart, but peaked at number seven on the Uruguayan Chamber of Disc's monthly digital singles chart.) | — | PROMUSICAE: Platinum; RIAA: Gold (Latin) | Non-album singles |
| "Dangerous" (with Trueno and Bizarrap) | 2022 | 83 | — | — | — | — | — | — | — | — | — | | Parte de Mí |
| "Arrepentio" (with Aleesha, Taichu and Juicy Bae) | 2022 | — | — | — | — | — | — | — | — | — | — | | La Patrona |
| "Nota" (with Eladio Carrión) | 2022 | — | — | — | — | — | — | — | 66 | — | — | PROMUSICAE: Platinum | Non-album single |
| "Intoxicao" (with Emilia) | 2022 | 8 | — | — | — | — | — | — | — | — | — | CAPIF: Gold; AMPROFON: Gold; PROMUSICAE: Gold; RIAA: Gold (Latin) | Tú Crees en Mí? |
| "Naturaleza" (with Camilo) | 2022 | 64 | — | — | — | — | — | — | — | — | — | | De Adentro Pa' Fuera |
| "Nobody Like Yo" | 2022 | 37 | — | — | — | — | — | — | — | — | — | | Non-album singles |
| "Frío" | 2022 | 35 | — | — | — | — | — | — | — | — | — | | Non-album singles |
| "Marisola" (remix) (with Cris MJ, Duki y Standly) | 2022 | 1 | 18 | 1 | — | — | 10 | 1 | 20 | 11 | — | PROMUSICAE: 2× Platinum | Non-album singles |
| "Por Las Noches" (remix) (with Peso Pluma) | 2023 | — | — | — | — | — | — | — | — | — | — | AMPROFON: 2× Platinum | Non-album singles |
| "No Voy a Llorar" | 2023 | 36 | — | — | — | — | — | — | — | — | — | | Alma |
| "Que Le Pasa Conmigo?" (with Rels B) | 2023 | 21 | — | — | — | — | 27 | — | 32 | — | — | AMPROFON: Gold; PROMUSICAE: Platinum; RIAA: Gold (Latin) | Alma |
| "Paz" (with Morad) | 2023 | — | — | — | — | — | — | — | 39 | — | — | PROMUSICAE: Gold | Reinsertado |
| "Dispara ***" (with Milo J) | 2023 | 11 | — | — | — | — | — | — | 67 | — | — | AMPROFON: Gold; PROMUSICAE: Platinum; RIAA: Gold (Latin) | Alma |
| "8 AM" (with Young Miko) | 2023 | 25 | — | — | — | — | — | — | — | — | — | AMPROFON: Gold; PROMUSICAE: Gold; RIAA: Platinum (Latin) | Alma |
| "X Eso BB" (with Jere Klein) | 2023 | 35 | — | 1 | — | — | — | — | — | — | — | PROFOVI: Gold | Non-album singles |
| "Enamórate" (featuring Bad Gyal) | 2023 | 68 | — | — | — | — | 99 | — | 24 | — | — | PROMUSICAE: Gold | Non-album singles |
| "Tienes Mi Alma" | 2023 | — | — | — | — | — | — | — | — | — | — | | Alma |
| "Una Foto (Remix)" (with Mesita and Tiago PZK featuring Emilia) | 2024 | 1 | 1 | 7 | — | — | — | 2 | 6 | 7 | — | PROMUSICAE: 2× Platinum | Non-album singles |
| "Ojos Verdes" | 2024 | 1 | — | — | — | — | — | — | — | — | — | | Non-album singles |
| "Desquite" (with Grupo Frontera) | 2024 | — | — | — | — | — | — | — | — | — | — | | Jugando a Que No Pasa Nada |
| "Diferente" (with Blessd and The Rudeboyz) | 2024 | — | — | — | — | — | — | — | — | — | — | | BelssDeluxury |
| "Cafecito" (with Gordo and Sech) | 2024 | — | — | — | — | — | — | — | — | — | — | | Diamante |
| "Perros & Gata$" (with Saiko) | 2024 | — | — | — | — | — | — | — | 33 | — | — | | Non-album singles |
| "Doctor" (with Luck Ra) | 2024 | 4 | — | — | — | — | — | — | — | — | — | | Non-album singles |
| "Somos 3" (with Lit Killah) | 2024 | 50 | — | — | — | — | — | — | — | — | — | | Kustom |
| "Perfume" (with Bhavi) | 2024 | — | — | — | — | — | — | — | — | — | — | | Bhavilonia |
| "Forty" | 2024 | 88 | — | — | — | — | — | — | — | — | — | | Naiki |
| "Sheite" | 2024 | 97 | — | — | — | — | — | — | — | — | — | | Naiki |
| "We Love That Shit" (with Khea) | 2024 | — | — | — | — | — | — | — | — | — | — | | Naiki |
| "Vulnerable" (with Delaossa) | 2025 | — | — | — | — | — | — | — | 43 | — | — | | La Madrugá |
| "Blackout" (with Emilia and Tini) | 2025 | 1 | — | — | — | — | — | — | 8 | 5 | — | | TBA |
"—" denotes a recording that did not chart or was not released in that territory.

=== Promotional singles ===
List of promotional singles showing year released and album name
| Title | Year | Peaks | Album |
| Title | Year | PAR | Album |
|---|---|---|---|
| "Pensamos" (with Mon Laferte) | 2021 | 82 | Parte de Mí |

== Other charted songs ==
List of other charted songs, with peak positions, showing year released and album name
| Title | Year | Peaks | | Certifications | Album |
| Title | Year | ARG | PAR | Certifications | Album |
|---|---|---|---|---|---|
| "Plegarias" | 2021 | — | 69 | AMPROFON: Platinum; PROMUSICAE: Gold | Recuerdos |
| "Cambiando la Piel" (with Wos) | 2022 | — | — (Note: "Cambiando la Piel" did not enter the SGP Paraguay Top 100 chart, but peaked at number 15 on the Monitor Latino Paraguay Top 20 Pop airplay chart.) | | Oscuro Éxtasis |
| "Caen Las Estrellas" (with Ysy A) | 2023 | 46 | — | | Alma |
| "Alumbre" (with Milo J) | 2023 | 55 | — | | 1 1 1 |
"—" denotes a recording that did not chart or was not released in that territory.

== Music videos ==
List of music videos, showing year released and director
| Title | Year | Director(s) |
|---|---|---|
| "Wapo Traketero" | 2019 | Cecilia Sarmiento |
| "Nicki Nicole: Bzrp Music Sessions, Vol. 13" | 2019 | Glyfe |
| "Años Luz" | 2019 | Cocodrilo |
| "Fucking Diablo" | 2019 | Ballve |
| "Diva" | 2019 | Ballve |
| "Colocao" | 2020 | Jess "La Polaca" Praznik |
| "Mamichula" | 2020 | Lucas Vignale |
| "Mala Vida" | 2020 | Jess "La Polaca" Praznik |
| "Verte" | 2020 | Jess "La Polaca" Praznik |
| "Ella No Es Tuya (Remix)" | 2021 | Manuel DH |
| "Venganza" | 2021 | Israel Adrián Caetano |
| "No Toque Mi Naik" | 2021 | La Tara |
| "Tu Fanático (Remix)" | 2021 | Daniel Eguren |
| "Me Has Dejado" | 2021 | —N/a |
| "YaMeFui" | 2021 | Agustín Portela and Lucas Vignale |
| "Toa La Vida" | 2021 | Daniel Eguren |
| "Parte de Mi" | 2021 | Rodrigo González and Tomás Seivane |
| "Baby" | 2021 | Jess "La Polaca" Praznik |
| "Pa Mis Muchachas" | 2021 | Alexandre Moore |
| "Sabe" | 2021 | Gus |
| "Otra Noche" | 2021 | Toro Films |
