= 26th Annual Premios Gardel =

2024 edition of Argentine award ceremony

- Date: 28 May 2024
- Location: Movistar Arena; Buenos Aires, Argentina
- Hosted by: Iván de Pineda

Highlights
- Most awards: Miranda!; Lali; Milo J; Bizarrap (3 each)
- Most nominations: Milo J (15)
- Website: premiosgardel.org.ar

Television/radio coverage
- Network: Star+; Star Channel

The 26th Annual Premios Gardel honored the best recordings, compositions, and artists from 1 January to 31 December 2023, as chosen by the members of Argentine Chamber of Phonograms and Videograms Producers, on 28 May 2024. In its 3rd year at the Movistar Arena in Buenos Aires, the ceremony was broadcast on Star+ and Star Channel, and was hosted by Iván de Pineda for the third time. The event was co-hosted by Evelyn Botto, Nacho Elizalde and Cris Vanadía. The nominations were announced on 30 April 2024; Milo J received the most nominations with fifteen, followed by Emilia with twelve.

Miranda!, Lali, Milo J and Bizarrap were the night's biggest winners, receiving three awards each. In the big four categories, Miranda! won Album of the Year for Hotel Miranda!, Lali won Song of the Year for "Obsesión", Fito Páez won Record of the Year for the 2023 version of "La Rueda Mágica", which featured Andrés Calamaro and Conociendo Rusia, and Milo J won Best New Artist. Charly García was honored with the Lifetime Achievement "Say No More" Award.

Lali made history as the first female artist to win Song of the Year three times, joining only Abel Pintos and Vicentico. Moreover, she became the first artist in history to win Best Music Video with two videos from the same album after winning with "Disciplina" in 2023 and with "Quiénes Son?" in 2024.

The premiere ceremony took place earlier on the same day as the main event at the Vorterix Theater in Buenos Aires. During the ceremony, the winners of 30 out of the 50 categories were announced. The event was not broadcast live, but a television special aired on 29 May 2024 on Star+.

== Background ==
=== Category changes ===
For the 2024 ceremony, three new pop categories were introduced, expanding the total number of categories to 50. This move was interpreted as a response to the criticism faced by the awards in the preceding year for overlooking prominent pop artists, notably Lali, in favor of songs that, while popular, did not strictly fit the pop genre, such as "Muchachos, Ahora Nos Volvimos a Ilusionar" by La Mosca Tsé - Tsé. The new categories were Best Urban Pop Album and Best Urban Pop Song, while the category for Best Romantic/Melodic Album was rebranded to Best Traditional Pop Album.

=== Issues in the voting process ===
Unlike the other categories, where winners are chosen by a committee selected by the Argentine Chamber of Phonograms and Videograms Producers (CAPIF), the winner of the Song of the Year category is chosen online by the audience via Instagram and Facebook. On 23 May 2024, CAPIF announced the suspension of social media voting for this category. The decision stemmed from the detection of serious irregularities that compromised the integrity of the voting process.

According to the official statement issued by CAPIF, problems were identified in the social media voting. These irregularities revealed the presence of numerous votes not from authentic users or genuine followers of the nominated artists, but from bots—computer programs designed to simulate human activity online. This discovery raised concerns within the Argentine music industry, as it undermined the transparency and fairness expected in a public voting process. "This situation is unacceptable and absolutely incompatible with the objective of public voting, as it does not represent the will or preference of the public at all," CAPIF stated. Therefore, it was confirmed that voting via social media was completely annulled. However, they assured that alternative methods were being evaluated to determine the winner of the Song of the Year category, while consistently upholding the principles of fairness and transparency that characterize the awards. It was clarified that the category would neither be suspended nor voted on by a special jury. The goal was to rely on the public's opinion, as they had been the ones deciding the winners for this category for several years. On 28 May 2024 at 12:00 PM ART, a voting line was open to choose the winner of the category via SMS. Later that evening, during the main ceremony, "Obsesión" by Lali was proclaimed Song of the Year.

== Performers ==
The first batch of performers, including Nicki Nicole, Miranda!. Tiago PZK and Milo J, among others, was announced on 20 May 2024. The second batch of performers was announced on 24 May 2024. It included Album of the Year nominees Lali and David Lebón, among others. The performers for the premiere ceremony were announced on 28 May 2024.

=== Premiere ceremony ===
- Los del Portezuelo
- BB Asul
- Mar Marzo
- Clara Cava

=== Main ceremony ===
List of performers
Artist(s)	Song(s)
Luck Ra	"Que Me Falte Todo" "Hola Perdida" "La Morocha"
Miranda! Ca7riel y Paco Amoroso	"Don"
Milo J	"M.A.I" "Rara Vez"
Usted Señálemelo	"Nuevo Comienzo"
David Lebón Luz Gaggi	Tribute to Charly García "Desarma y Sangra"
Los Nocheros MYA Emanero	"Entre La Tierra y El Cielo"
Rosario Ortega Indios	Tribute to Charly García "Pasajera en Trance"
Tiago PZK	"Mi Corazón"
Bandalos Chinos Lisandro Aristimuño	Tribute to Charly García "Viernes, 3AM"
Lali	"Disciplina"
Fabiana Cantilo Silvestre y la Naranja	Tribute to Charly García "Demoliendo Hoteles"
Ráfaga Fer Vázquez Roze Salastkbron L-Gante La T y La M El Negro Tecla	"Una Cerveza" "Inocente" "Tal Par Cual" "Ahí Ahí" "Pa' La Selección"
Nicki Nicole	"No Voy a Llorar :')" "Dispara ***"

== Winners and nominees ==
The nominations were announced on 30 April 2024 on a livestream by Fede Bareiro, Cris Vanadía, Ceci Mendez and Guille Gilabert. Winners appear first and highlighted in bold.

=== General Field ===
General Field
**Album of the Year**: **Hotel Miranda! – Miranda!**; Herencia Lebón – David Lebón; .MP3 – Emilia; EADDA9223 – Fito Páez; Lali – Lali; 111 – Milo J
**Song of the Year**: **"Obsesión" – Lali**; **Mariana Espósito, Martín D'Agosto & Mauro De Tommaso, songwriters**; "Shakira: Bzrp Music Sessions, Vol. 53" – Bizarrap & Shakira; Shakira Mebarak, Gonzalo Conde, Francisco Zecca, Santiago Alvarado & Keityn, songwriters; "Medalla de Oro" – Él Mató a un Policía Motorizado; Santiago Barrionuevo, songwriter; "La Original" – Emilia & Tini; Emilia Mernes, Martina Stoessel, Mauro Lombardo, Andrés Torres & Mauricio Rengifo, songwriters; "Investido" – Evlay, Wos & Santiago Motorizado; Facundo Yalve, Valentín Oliva, Santiago Barrionuevo & Agustín Piva, songwriters; "Los del Espacio" – Lit Killah, Duki, Emilia, Tiago PZK, FMK, Rusherking, María Becerra & Big One; Daniel Real, Enzo Sauthier, María de los Ángeles Becerra, Emilia Mernes, Mauro Lombardo, Mauro Monzón, Thomas Tobar & Tiago Pacheco, songwriters; "La Morocha" – Luck Ra & BM; Renzo Luca, Brian Martignone, Facundo Almerana, Gonzalo Fontana & Javier Sanglerman, songwriters; "Corazón Vacío" – María Becerra; María de los Ángeles Becerra & Xavier Rosero, songwriters; "Dispara ***" – Nicki Nicole & Milo J; Nicole Cucco, Camilo Villaruel, Santiago Alvarado & Santiago Ruiz, songwriters; "Tranky Funky" – Trueno; Mateo Palacios, Agustín Taylor, Santiago Ruiz & Santiago Alvarado, songwriters
**Record of the Year**: **"La Rueda Mágica – EADDA9223" – Fito Páez featuring Andrés Calamaro & Conociendo Rusia**; **Fito Paez, Gustavo Borner & Diego Olivero, producers; Gustavo Borner, Phil Levine, Diego Olivero, Augusto Flores & Justin Moshkevich, recording engineers**; "Shakira: Bzrp Music Sessions, Vol. 53" – Bizarrap & Shakira; Bizarrap, producer; Gonzalo Julian Conde, Dave Clauss, Roger Rodes & Dani Val, recording engineers; "La Original" – Emilia & Tini; Andrés Torres & Mauricio Rengifo, producers; Andrés Torres, Mauricio Rengifo & Tom Norris, recording engineers; "Obsesión" – Lali; Mauro De Tommaso, producer; Mauro De Tommaso, Javier Caso & Lewis Pickett, recording engineers; "Los del Espacio" – Lit Killah, Duki, Emilia, Tiago PZK, FMK, Rusherking, María Becerra & Big One; Big One & Xross, producers; Daniel Ismael Real, recording engineer; "La Morocha" – Luck Ra & BM; Renzo Luca, Phontana & Ramky, producers; Renzo Luca, recording engineer; "Corazón Vacío" – María Becerra; Xross, producer; Xross, Matthew Morales & Emerson Mancini, recording engineers; "M.A.I" – Milo J; Facundo Yalve, producer; Facundo Yalve & Javier Fracchia recording engineers; "Dispara ***" – Nicki Nicole & Milo J; Tatool & Santiago Alvarado, producers; Santiago Ruiz, recording engineer; "Tranky Funky" – Trueno; Brian Taylor, Santiago Alvarado & Tatool, producers; Brian Taylor, Santiago Alvarado & Santiago Ruiz, recording engineers
**Best New Artist**: **Milo J**; Barro; BB Asul; Big One; Evlay; Julián Baglietto; Luz Gaggi; Mar Marzo; Mariela Carabajal; Mujer Cebra; Tomi Lago; Un Verano; Winona Riders	**Collaboration of the Year**: **"Shakira: Bzrp Music Sessions, Vol. 53" – Bizarrap & Shakira**; "La Original" – Emilia & Tini; "Que Me Falte Todo" – Luck Ra & Abel Pintos; "Perfecta (Versión 2023)" – Miranda!, María Becerra & FMK

=== Pop ===
Pop
**Best Pop Album**: **Lali – Lali**; Hasta el Alma – Luciano Pereyra; Altar – Luz Gaggi	**Best Pop Song**: **"Mejor Que Ayer" – Diego Torres**; "A Tu Lado" – Alejandro Lerner; "Pelo Suelto" – Elsa y Elmar & Conociendo Rusia; "Obsesión" – Lali; "Siesta de Verano" – Luciano Pereyra & Luis Fonsi; "Perfecta (Versión 2023)" – Miranda!, María Becerra & FMK
**Best Pop Group Album**: **Hotel Miranda! – Miranda!**; Kamaleon – De La Rivera; Renacimiento – Turf	**Best Traditional Pop Album**: **Toda Una Vida – Dany Martin**; Aute por Demare – María José Demare; Lo Que Soy – Yamir Rojas
**Best Urban Pop Album**: **.MP3 – Emilia**; Romance Mixtape 2 – Lara91k; Acoustic Session – María Becerra; Cupido – Tini	**Best Urban Pop Song**: **"Shakira: Bzrp Music Sessions, Vol. 53" – Bizarrap & Shakira**; "La Original" – Emilia & Tini; "Corazón Vacío" – María Becerra

=== Rock ===
Rock
**Best Rock Album**: **Herencia Lebón — David Lebón**; Carcasutra — Carca; EADDA9223 — Fito Páez	**Best Rock Song**: **"San Saltarín" – Divididos**; "Tajada" – Babasónicos; "Y No Me Digan Nada" – Mujer Cebra; "Nuevo Comienzo" – Usted Señalemelo
**Best Rock Group Album**: **Super Terror — Él Mató a un Policía Motorizado**; ¿Quién Sabe? — Las Pastillas del Abuelo; Canción Mata Algoritmo — Todo Aparenta Normal	**Best Hard Rock/Punk Album**: **Constimordor — Barro**; Emergencia — Claudio Marciello; Oscuro Plan de Poder — Malon

=== Urban & Reggae ===
Urban & Reggae
**Best Urban Album**: **Alma – Nicki Nicole**; En Dormir sin Madrid – Bizarrap & Milo J; Antes de Ameri – Duki; Mafia Lirical – Ecko; Serotonina – Khea; Portales – Tiago PZK; Tu Duo Favorito – Ysy A & Bhavi	**Best Urban Song**: **"Fruto" – Bizarrap & Milo J**; "En La Intimidad" – Big One, Emilia & Callejero Fino; "Un Finde" – Big One, FMK & Ke Personajes; "Minimi" – Dillom; "Remember Me" – Duki, Khea & Bizarrap; "Mercho (Remix)" – Lil Cake, Ozuna & Ryan Castro featuring Migrantes & Nico Valdi; "Los del Espacio" – Lit Killah, Duki, Emilia, Tiago PZK, FMK, Rusherking, María Becerra & Big One; "Rara Vez" – Milo J & Taiu; "8 AM" – Nicki Nicole & Young Miko; "Tranky Funky" – Trueno
**Best Urban Collaboration**: **"Los del Espacio" – Lit Killah, Duki, Emilia, Tiago PZK, FMK, Rusherking, María Becerra & Big One**; "Un Finde" – Big One, FMK & Ke Personajes; "Milo J: Bzrp Music Sessions, Vol. 57" – Bizarrap & Milo J; "Remember Me" – Duki, Khea & Bizarrap; "Dispara ***" – Nicki Nicole & Milo J; "Fuck el Police (Remix)" – Trueno & Cypress Hill	**Best Reggae/Ska Album**: **Ska Beat City Sings Jamaica – Ska Beat City**; La Misión – El Natty Combo; Volveré a Encenderte – Raices

=== Tango, Jazz, Classical & Instrumental ===
Tango, Jazz, Classical & Instrumental
**Best Tango Album**: **El Cantor de Tangos – Guillermo Fernández**; Minella – Carolina Minella; Manifiesto – Omar Mollo & El Muro Tango	**Best Tango Song**: **"Cicatrices" – Quinteto Negro La Boca**; "Se Cayó La Luna" – Guillermo Fernández; "Magia en Buenos Aires" – Susana Rinaldi & Osvaldo Piro
**Best Instrumental Tango Orchestra Album**: **Cicatrices – Quinteto Negro La Boca**; Visiones Pandémicas – Juan Pablo Navarro Speteto; Reencuentro – Susana Rinaldi & Osvaldo Piro	**Best Instrumental/Fusion/World Music Album**: **Eiké! (Entrar en el Alma) – Chango Spasiuk**; Ecléctica – Manu Sija; Semillas de Milonga (Libro 1 y 2) – Martín Liut
**Best Jazz Album**: **Escalectric – Escalandrum**; La Falacia del Espantapájaros, Música de Flores Vol. 6 – Juan "Pollo" Raffo featuring Tomás Pagano & Rodrigo Genni; Los Trabajos y Las Noches – Roxana Amed & Frank Carlberg	**Best Classical Album**: **Dos Siglos de Música – Compositoras Argentinas Vol 2 – Melina Marcos**; Parotti, Obras para Violín y Piano Vol. 1 – Elías Gurevich & Melina Marcos; Metamorphosen – Ernesto Acher & Ensamble Sur

=== Folk ===
Folk
**Best Folklore Album**: **Canciones del Viento – Maggie Cullen**; Suelto – José Luis Aguirre; Vida – Marcelo Dellamea; Natural – Soledad; Retrato de Familia – Teresa Parodi	**Best Folklore Song**: **"Baile Eterno" – Mery Murua**; "Río" – Ahyre, Los Tekis & Pitín Zalazar; "Donde Hay Amor No Hay Olvido" – Jorge Rojas; "Muere y Llueve" – Los Tabaleros featuring Soledad; "Donde Quiera Que Van" – Teresa Parodi featuring Lula Bertoldi, Ivonne Guzmán, Nadia Larcher & Ana Prada
**Best Folklore Group Album**: **Eco – Ahyre**; Material Urgente – Luciana Jury & Milagros Caliva; Puñado de Tierra – Orquesta Popular de la UNA	**Best Chamamé Album**: **Aromas del Tiempo – Dúo Bote**; Volver en Guitarra – Diego Arolfo; Las Guaynas Porá – Las Guaynas Porá

=== Tropical & Cuarteto ===
Tropical & Cuarteto
**Best Tropical Album**: **Porque Te Quiero – Nico Mattioli**; Favoritos – Dalila; Resiliencia – Julián Bruno	**Best Cuarteto Album**: **La Muela – LBC – Eugenia Quevedo & La Banda de Carlitos**; La Voz Femenina del Cuarteto (En Vivo) – Magui Olave; Luna Park N° 12 (En Vivo) – Ulises Bueno
**Best Tropical Song**: **"Adicto" – Emanero, La K'onga & Antonio Rios**; "Adiós Amor" – La Delio Valdez & Ke Personajes; "Enemigo" – Rodrigo Tapari	**Best Cuarteto Song**: **"La Morocha" – Luck Ra & BM**; "Mentiras" – Big One, Ulises Bueno & Rusherking; "Buen Actor" – Juan Ingaramo & Ulises Bueno; "Si Pudiera" – La K'onga, Luck Ra & El Vecino
**Best Tropical Group Album**: **Los Charros 30 Años – Los Charros**; Live Session #1 – Tambó Tambó; Cumbia Viva Session #3 Los Leales – Cumbia Viva & Los Leales	**Best Cuarteto Group Album**: **Arriba Las Palmitas – Cachumba**; Desde el Bar – Banda Mix; 25 Años – La Banda al Rojo Vivo

=== Alternative & Dance/Electronic ===
Alternative & Dance/Electronic
**Best Alternative Pop Album**: **Nafta II – Nafta**; Pura – BB Asul; Hola Precioso – El Kuelgue; Aqua di Emma – Emmanuel Horvilleur; Sueño Cítrico – Silvestre y la Naranja; Pulsión – Mar Marzo; Rawr – Taichu	**Best Alternative Rock Album**: **Tripolar – Usted Señalemelo**; El Final de las Cosas – Barbi Recanati; Clase B – Mujer Cebra; Neo – Neo Pistea; El Sonido del Éxtasis – Winona Riders
**Best Alternative Folklore Album**: **Caramelos de Felicidad – Los Tabaleros**; Eletrío: Los Árboles Míos – Eleonora Eubel, Marcelo Lupis & Rodrigo Agudelo; Dueña de Mí – Verónica Condomí	**Best Electronic Music Album**: **333 – Evlay**; Fetiche – Electrochongo; Quimera – Mistol Team

=== Live, Music Video, Visual Media & Children's ===
Live, Music Video, Visual Media & Children's
**Best Live Album**: **Divididos en Vélez – Agradecer y Seguir – Divididos**; Homenaje a De Ushuahia a La Quiaca – Barbarita Palacios; XV Años – En Vivo Estadio Obras – Eruca Sativa; Salir de Acá! – Lucy Patané; Miguel Mateos Sinfónico (En Vivo) – Miguel Mateos
**Best Music Video**: **"Quiénes Son?" – (Lali)**; **Lali Espósito, video director**; "Ola de Suicidios" – (Dillom); Andrés Capasso, video director; "La Original" – (Emilia & Tini); Facundo Ballve, video directors; "Fuck el Police (Remix)" – (Trueno & Cypress Hill); El Dorado & Facundo Voncoptel, video directors	**Best Long Form Music Video**: **Hotel Miranda! – (Miranda!)**; **Melanie Anton Def, video director**; En Dormir sin Madrid – (Bizarrap & Milo J); Bizarrap, Pedro Colmeiro, Facundo Ballve, Julia Conde, Lucas Vignale & Lorenzo Ferro, video directors; XV Años – En Vivo Estadio Obras – (Eruca Sativa); Rodrigo Alonso, video director
**Best Cinema/Television/Audiovisual Production Soundtrack Album**: **The Last of Us: Season 1 – Gustavo Santaolalla**; El Encargado 2 – Alejandro Kauderer & Ignacio Gabriel; Norma – Tomi Lebrero	**Best Children's Album**: **Para saber que te quiero – Canticuénticos**; Upa – Pim Pau; Malos Negocios – Raviolis

=== Package, Concept, Historical & Singer-Songwriter ===
Package, Concept, Historical & Singer-Songwriter
**Best Cover Design**: **333 — (Evlay)**; **Paula Fernández, designer**; 111 — (Milo J); Milo J, designer; Alma — (Nicki Nicole); Cesar Balcazar & Carlos Daniel Ilic, designer	**Best Concept Album**: **Mercedes Florecida – Mercedes Sosa**; Mojones "Signos y Memorias de la Patria" – Liliana Herrero, Teresa Parodi & Juan Falú; 111 – Milo J; Sur – Yami Safdie
**Best Catalog Collection Album**: **El hombre que canta al hombre (1964 – Remasterizado) – Ramón Ayala El Mensú**; Grabaciones Completas en Music Hall 1969/1972 – Banana; Muerte en la Catedral 50 Aniversario – Litto Nebbia	**Best Singer-Songwriter Album**: **El Rostro de los Acantilados – Lisandro Aristimuño**; La Fuerza – Duratierra; 3D – Santi Celli; Tríada – Sol Bassa

=== Production & Engineering ===
Production & Engineering
**Producer of the Year**: **111 – (Milo J)**; **Facundo Yalve, producer**; Escalectric – (Escalandrum); Escalandrum & Esteban Sehinkman, producers; EADDA9223 – (Fito Páez); Fito Páez, Diego Olivero & Gustavo Vorner, producers; Lali – (Lali); Mauro De Tommaso, Dano, Jean Luka, Lex Luthorz, producers; Hotel Miranda! – (Miranda!); Evlay, Mauro De Tommaso, Alejandro Sergi, Big One, Brian Taylor, Didi Gutman, Jay De la Cueva, Gabriel Lucena, Renzo Luca & Cachorro López, producers; Alma – (Nicki Nicole); Tatool, producer	**Best Recording Engineering**: **Escalectric – (Escalandrum)**; **Facundo Rodríguez, recording engineer**; Antes de Ameri – (Duki); Federico Yesan Rojas, Francisco Zecca, Tomás Santos Asan & Javier Fracchia, recording engineers; EADDA9223 – (Fito Páez); Gustavo Borner, Phil Levine, Diego Olivero, Augusto Flores & Justin Moshkevich, recording engineers; 111 – (Milo J); Facundo Yalve, Santiago Ruiz & Javier Fracchia, recording engineers; Alma – (Nicki Nicole); Tatool, Pablo Díaz-Reixa, Salvador Majail, Diego Lopez Crespo & Daniel Heredia Vidal, recording engineers

== Special awards ==
=== Say No More Award ===
Charly García was honored with the Say No More Award for his illustrious career in Argentine music history. His colleague David Lebón accepted the award on his behalf. Throughout the evening, various artists paid tribute by performing several of García's songs.

- Charly García

== Multiple nominations and awards ==
The following received multiple awards:

Three:

- Bizarrap
- Lali
- Milo J
- Miranda!

Two:

- Divididos
- Emilia
- Escalandrum
- Evlay
- Quinteto La Boca
- Shakira

The following received multiple nominations:

Fifteen:

- Milo J

Twelve:

- Emilia

Ten:

- Bizarrap
- María Becerra

Nine:

- Big One

Eight:

- Duki
- FMK
- Nicki Nicole

Seven:

- Lali

Six:

- Miranda!
- Tini
