= Dispara =

2023 single by Nicki Nicole and Milo J

Single by Nicki Nicole and Milo J

from the album Alma
- Released: 17 May 2023
- Genre: Latin trap
- Length: 2:23
- Label: Sony Music Latin; Dale Play Records
- Songwriters: Nicole Denise Cucco; Camilo Joaquín Villarruel; Santiago Ruiz; Santiago Alvarado
- Producers: Santiago Alvarado; Tatool

Nicki Nicole singles chronology
| "Frío" (2022) | "Dispara" (2023) | "No Voy a Llorar" (2024) |

Milo J singles chronology
| "Al Borde (511)" (2023) | "Dispara" (2023) | "Rincón" (2023) |

Music video
- "Dispara" on YouTube

"Dispara" (lit. 'Shoot'; stylized as DISPARA ***) is a song co-written and recorded by Argentine singers Nicki Nicole and Milo J. The track was released by Sony Music Latin and Dale Play Records on 17 May 2023, as the third single from Nicole's third studio album, Alma (2023).

Commercially, "Dispara" reached the top 20 on the Argentina Hot 100. It has received a platinum certification in Mexico, Spain, and the United States (Latin field), a nomination at the 24th Latin Grammy Awards, and three nominations at the 26th Annual Premios Gardel.

== Background and composition ==
Through her social media, Nicole announced the tracklist for her studio album Alma, which features the song "Dispara," a collaboration with Argentinian artist Milo J. "Dispara" was released on 17 May 2023, one day before the official release of the album.

The lyrics for "Dispara" describe the challenges that the music industry presents and the determination one must have to get ahead. The track is a hip hop that is composed on a boom bap basis.

== Commercial performance ==
In Nicole's native country, Argentina, "Dispara" peaked at number 11 on the Billboard Argentina Hot 100 in July 2023. In the same month, it also peaked at number 67 in Spain.

== Charts ==
Chart performance for "Dispara"
| Chart (2023) | Peak position |
|---|---|
| Argentina (Argentina Hot 100) | 11 |
| Spain (Promusicae) | 67 |

== Certifications ==
Certifications and sales for "Dispara"
| Region | Certification | Certified units/sales |
|---|---|---|
| Mexico (AMPROFON) | Platinum | 140,000^{‡} |
| Spain (Promusicae) | Platinum | 60,000^{‡} |
| United States (RIAA) | Platinum (Latin) | 60,000^{‡} |
^{‡} Sales+streaming figures based on certification alone.

== Awards and nominations ==
| Year | Ceremony | Category | Result | Ref. |
|---|---|---|---|---|
| Latin Grammy Awards | 2023 | Best Rap/Hip Hop Song | Nominated | |
| Premios Gardel | 2024 | Song of the Year | Nominated | |
| Premios Gardel | 2024 | Record of the Year | Nominated | |
| Premios Gardel | 2024 | Best Urban Collaboration | Nominated | |
