= Si No Es Contigo =

2024 single by Cris MJ

Single by Cris MJ
- Released: 23 May 2024
- Genre: Reggaeton
- Length: 2:36
- Label: Stars Chile; Sonar
- Songwriter: Christopher Andrés Álvarez García
- Producer: Nes on the Shet

Cris MJ singles chronology
"Quickie" (2024)	"Si No Es Contigo" (2024)	"Percosex" (2024)

Music video
- "Si No Es Contigo" on YouTube

"Si No Es Contigo" (transl. "If It's Not with You") is a song by Chilean singer Cris MJ, released on 23 May 2024, and produced by Nes on the Shet. A remix featuring Kali Uchis and Jhayco was released on October 17, 2024.

== Background ==
According to Luminate, the song amassed 7.9 million official streams in the United States in the May 24–30 tracking week.

== Composition ==
"Si No Es Contigo" is a reggaeton song fused with Middle Eastern rhythms. It contains romantic and sensual lyrics, in which Cris MJ compliments a girl for looking beautiful in everything she wears.

== Music video ==
A music video for the song was filmed in Paris.

== Charts ==
=== Weekly charts ===
Weekly chart performance for "Si No Es Contigo"
Chart (2024)	Peak position
Argentina (Argentina Hot 100)	24
Chile (Billboard)	1
Ecuador (Billboard)	23
Global 200 (Billboard)	37
Italy (FIMI)	96
Mexico (Billboard)	22
Peru (Billboard)	7
Spain (PROMUSICAE)	31
US Billboard Hot 100	72
US Hot Latin Songs (Billboard)	3

=== Year-end charts ===
2024 year-end chart performance for "Si No Es Contigo"
Chart (2024)	Position
Global 200 (Billboard)	194
US Hot Latin Songs (Billboard)	27

2025 year-end chart performance for "Si No Es Contigo"
Chart (2025)	Position
Global 200 (Billboard)	153

== Certifications ==
Certifications for "Si No Es Contigo"
Region	Certification	Certified units/sales
Italy (FIMI)	Gold	50,000^{‡}
Spain (PROMUSICAE)	Gold	30,000^{‡}
^{‡} Sales+streaming figures based on certification alone.
