= Parte de Mí =

2021 studio album by Nicki Nicole

Studio album by Nicki Nicole
- Released: October 28, 2021
- Recorded: 2020–2021
- Genre: R&B; latin pop; latin trap; reggaeton
- Length: 48:32
- Language: Spanish
- Label: Dale Play; Sony Latin
- Producer: Mauro De Tommaso; Julio Reyes; Evlay; Caleb Calloway; Bizarrap; Mora; Machaelo Angelo Cole Garrido; Richi López; Kiddo Manteca; Yalve; Tatool

Nicki Nicole chronology
Recuerdos (2019)	Parte de Mí (2021)	Alma (2023)

Singles from Parte de Mí
- 1. "Colocao" Released: May 14, 2020; 2. "Mala Vida" Released: September 5, 2020; 3. "Verte" Released: December 10, 2020; 4. "Me Has Dejado" Released: July 6, 2021; 5. "Toa La Vida" Released: August 31, 2021; 6. "Parte de Mí" Released: September 30, 2021; 7. "Baby" Released: October 7, 2021; 8. "Pensamos" Released: October 20, 2021; 9. "Sabe" Released: October 26, 2021

Parte de Mí (transl. Part of Me) is the second studio album by Argentine rapper Nicki Nicole. It was released on October 28, 2021, through Dale Play Records and Sony Music Latin. The album features the collaborations of artists such as Rauw Alejandro, Mon Laferte, Dread Mar I, Bizarrap, Mora, Trueno, Delaossa, Ptazeta, Snow Tha Product and Tiago PZK.

== Release and cover ==
The album was released on October 28, 2021, this is the first debut with the Sony Music Latin record label. The cover of Parte de Mí is a puzzle-based design; "I think the cover is a good representation of human beings, showing that we are all the sum of fragments, cuts, parts. We liked to play with the idea of a puzzle to show that it is in any order, we are all the total of various little things that complete us and make us who we are", explained the singer.

== Reception ==
=== Review ===
Professional ratings
Review scores
Source	Rating
Rolling Stone	3.5/5 stars
Rolling Stone Argentina	3.5/5 stars

Julyssa Lopez of the American edition for the Rolling Stone magazine gave it a 3.5/5 star rating. For his part, Emilio Zavaley, from Rolling Stone (Argentina), like the magazine's US edition rating, gave it a 3.5/5-star rating; and in evaluating him, he commented that "Nicki is not limited only to which markets she aims to conquer, she also seeks to develop in sounds outside of what she has shown so far". Billboard described in his evaluation: "Parte de Mí shows not only Nicki's powerful soulful voice, but also her agility to navigate between genres, such as hip hop, reggaeton, ballads and even disco-pop". Parte de Mí was ranked at number 33 in the list for "The 35 Best Spanish-Language and Bilingual Albums of 2021" by the American magazine Rolling Stone.

=== Commercial performance ===
After its release, the album debuted in second position on Spotify's Top 10 Album Debuts Global chart, behind only of = by Ed Sheeran; and at number 9 on the Top 10 USA Album Debuts, respectively.

In Spain, the album entered at number 34 on the PROMUSICAE chart on November 3, 2021, and reached a new peak at number 12 the following week.

== Promotion ==
=== Singles ===
The singer released "Colocao" on May 14, 2020, as the first single from the album, which represented her first contribution to Sony Music Latin. The song reached position #6 on the Argentina Hot 100 chart and was its first entry on the Spanish chart, where it peaked at number #48. In addition, she received a gold Latin record in US by Recording Industry Association of America (RIAA) and gold Mexico, a platinum record in Spain and a double platinum record in Argentina. Her music video was filmed by Nicki Nicole herself with the help of her brothers at her home during the quarantine, due to the COVID-19 pandemic, in Buenos Aires and was directed by Jessica Praznik from a distance.

The second single from the album, "Mala Vida," was released on September 5, 2020. From a commercial point of view, it obtained a positive response although it only managed to enter the lists of two countries, Argentina and Spain. The music video was a tribute to The Godfather; In Nicki's words: "Mala Vida arose after seeing The Godfather saga, I had never seen it and in three nights together with my producers we saw it in its entirety. From there I was born a lot of inspiration, to create something with a mafia style, but with my ideas. This is how ‘Mala Vida’ came about and with an incredible video it was perfectly captured. I always wanted to make a video based on a trailer and The Godfather and Italian culture was the trigger and my inspiration". "Verte," featuring Argentine singer Dread Mar I and Argentine producer Bizarrap, was released as the third single from the album on December 10, 2020. The song shows a new facet of the three musicians through a fusion between reggae, pop and rap. This reached its maximum peak in the Argentina Hot 100 the following year, placing it in position #14.

=== Tour ===
The album was promoted on Parte de Mí Tour, Nicki Nicole's first international projection tour. The tour will start in Rosario, Santa Fe, the artist's birthplace, on November 27 and 29 at the Teatro Broadway, given the success and the consequent sold out of the first date, while on the 28th of the same month she will be at the Quality Espacio from Córdoba. In addition, on December 3 she will be presented at the Teatro Gran Rex in the City of Buenos Aires, where it also sold out in a matter of hours and added a new day for the following day.

== Track listing ==
All the songs were written by Nicki Nicole.

Parte de Mí track listing
No.	Title	Writer(s)	Producer(s)	Length
1.	"Parte de Mí"	Nicole Denise Cucco; Facundo Yalve; Julio Reyes; Mauro de Tommaso	Mauro de Tommaso; Julio Reyes; Evlay	2:55
2.	"Darling"	Cucco; Yalve	Evlay	2:45
3.	"Sabe" (with Rauw Alejandro)	Cucco; Raúl Alejandro Ocasio; Eric Pérez Rovira; Yalve; Héctor C. Jiménez López; Jorge Pizarro; José M. Collazo; De Tommaso	Mauro De Tommaso; Caleb Calloway; Evlay	2:57
4.	"Si Vos Me Lo Pedís"	Cucco; Yalve	Evlay	3:21
5.	"Pensamos" (with Mon Laferte)	Cucco; Norma Monserrat Bustamante Laferte; Yalve	Mauro De Tommaso; Evlay	2:53
6.	"Verte" (with Dread Mar I and Bizarrap)	Cucco; Javier Castro; Gózalo Julián Conde; Yalve	Bizarrap; Evlay	2:37
7.	"LL (Interludio)"	Cucco; De Tommaso; Yalve	Mauro De Tommaso; Evlay	1:30
8.	"Colocao"	Cucco; Yalve; Conde	Bizarrap; Evlay	3:00
9.	"Toa La Vida" (with Mora)	Cucco; Gabriel Mora Quintero; Machaelo Angelo Cole Garrido	Mora; Machaelo Angelo Cole Garrido	3:38
10.	"Perdido"	Cucco; Yalve; Santiago Gabriel Ruiz	Mauro De Tommaso; Evlay	3:46
11.	"Dangerous" (with Trueno and Bizarrap)	Cucco; Mateo Palacios Corazzina; Conde; De Tommaso; Yalve	Mauro De Tommaso; Evlay; Tatool	2:39
12.	"Baby"	Cucco; Yalve; De Tommaso; Richi López	Mauro De Tommaso; Richi López; Evlay	2:44
13.	"Me Has Dejado" (with Delaossa)	Cucco; Daniel Martínez de la Ossa	Mauro De Tommaso; Kiddo Manteca; Evlay	4:02
14.	"Mala Vida"	Cucco; De Tommaso; Yalve	Mauro De Tommaso; Yalve	2:40
15.	"Tengo To" (with Ptazeta and Snow Tha Product)	Cucco; Claudia Feliciano; Zuleima Gonzáles Gonzáles; De Tommaso; Conde; Yalve	Bizarrap; Evlay	3:02
16.	"Dame" (with Tiago PZK)	Cucco; Tiago Uriel Pacheco Lezcano; Conde; Yalve	Bizarrap; Evlay	3:57
Total length:				48:32

== Personnel ==
Credits adapted from Genius.

Primary artist

- Nicki Nicole – vocals, songwriter, composer

Additional musicians

- Rauw Alejandro – featured vocals, songwriter (track 3)
- Mon Laferte – featured vocals, songwriter (track 5)
- Dread Mar I – featured vocals, songwriter (track 6)
- Mora – featured vocals, songwriter, bass, drums (track 9)
- Trueno – featured vocals, songwriter (track 11)
- Delaossa – featured vocals, songwriter (track 13)
- Ptazeta – featured vocals, songwriter (track 14)
- Snow Tha Product – featured vocals, songwriter (track 14)
- Tiago PZK – featured vocals, songwriter (track 15)
- Ayelen Zucker – backing vocals
- Camila Ibarra – backing vocals
- Alex Introini – bass, keyboards
- Caleb Calloway – bass, drums, keyboards, songwriter
- Evlay – bass, drums, guitar, keyboards, percussion, synth songwriter
- Juan Giménez Kuj – bass
- Agustín Piva – drums
- Bizarrap – drums, keyboards, songwriter
- Mauro de Tommaso – drums, guitar, keyboards, songwriter
- Nicolás Taranto – drums
- Gonzalo Hermida – guitar
- Leonardo Andersen – guitar
- Pedro Pasquale – guitar
- Kiddo Manteca – keyboards, percussion, songwriter
- Richi López – keyboards, songwriter
- Tatool – keyboards, songwriter
- Julio Reyes – piano, songwriter
- Eric Duars – songwriter
- Kenobi Sensei – songwriter
- Machaelo Angelo Cole Garrido – songwriter

Additional personnel

- Mauro de Tommaso – producer, mixing, recording engineer
- Evlay – producer, mixing, recording engineer
- Bizarrap – producer, recording engineer
- Caleb Calloway – producer
- Mora – producer
- Kiddo Manteca – producer, recording engineer
- Machaelo Angelo Cole Garrido – producer, mixing, recording engineer
- Julio Reyes – producer, recording engineer
- Richi López – producer, recording engineer
- Tatool – producer, recording engineer
- Felipe Trujillo Guerra – assistant engineer
- Javier Fracchia – mastering
- Nico Cotton – mixing
- Piklet – mixing
- Andrés Elijovich – arranger
- Axel Introini – recording engineer
- Joel Orta – recording engineer
- Juan Giménez Kuj – recording engineer
- Kenobi Sensei – recording engineer

== Charts ==
Chart (2021)	Peak position
Spanish Albums (Promusicae)	12
US Latin Pop Albums (Billboard)	13

== Certifications ==
Region	Certification	Certified units/sales
United States (RIAA)	Gold (Latin)	30,000^{‡}
^{‡} Sales+streaming figures based on certification alone.

== Release history ==
Region	Date	Label	Format	Ref
Various	October 28, 2021	Dale Play Records; Sony Music Latin	CD, digital download, streaming	
