= Una Noche en Medellín =

2022 single by Cris MJ

Single by Cris MJ
- Language: Spanish
- English title: "One Night in Medellín"
- Released: January 20, 2022
- Recorded: 2021
- Genre: Reggaeton
- Length: 2:33
- Label: Nabru Records; Stars Music Chile; Shishigang Records
- Songwriter: Cristopher Álvarez
- Producer: Fran C

Cris MJ singles chronology
"Booty Booty" (2021)	"Una Noche en Medellín" (2022)	"¿Cómo Te Va?" (2022)

Music video
- "Una Noche en Medellín" on YouTube

"Una Noche en Medellín" (English: One Night in Medellín) is a song by Chilean singer Cris MJ. It was published on January 20, 2022, through Nabru Records and Stars Music Chile. The single went viral on the TikTok app, leading to its popularity and increased views on other platforms.

== Background and release ==
In an interview, MJ commented that the song came up in the summer during a day of recording in the music studio with his producer Fran C, who presented him with a beat and based on that he worked on the track, claiming "I did it so that he They will dance on the beach, in the discotheques". In relation to the title that gives the song its name, he commented: "I imagined a night in Medellín and, apart from that, with what it said in the chorus, it sounded good. Then I left her, because everyone liked her".

On January 18, 2022, MJ posted a snippet of the music video as a preview through Instagram, also announcing that the release of "Una Noche en Medellín" would be on January 20 of that year.

== Commercial performance ==
The single managed to reach number 16 on Spotify's Global Top, thus being the second song by a Chilean artist to enter said ranking. Shortly after, it reached the top 10 of this list and became the most listened song by an artist from Chile on Spotify.

== Concert tour ==
In March 2022, the singer confirmed that he would embark on his Un noche en Medellín Tour, with which he would visit the countries of Mexico, Peru, Spain, Chile and the United Kingdom, in support of his single and the rest of his record material.

== Music video ==
The official music video was released simultaneously with the single on January 20, 2022. In the video, at the beginning, we can see Cris MJ sitting near a pool looking at his phone and listening to reggaeton music with automatic headphones. Then, we see a sexy woman arrive near MJ which shocks Cris MJ and she takes off her automatic headphones. Later, at sunset, we see MJ on a motorcycle and in a parked car. The video is about Cris MJ and a sexy girl partying in a house with a pool, during a night in the city of Medellín.

== Charts ==
=== Weekly charts ===
Weekly chart performance for "Una Noche en Medellín"
Chart (2022)	Peak position
Argentina (Argentina Hot 100)	21
Bolivia (Bolivia Songs)	4
Chile (Monitor Latino)	9
Chile (Chile Songs)	1
Colombia (Colombia Songs)	11
Colombia (Promúsica)	9
Costa Rica (Monitor Latino)	12
Costa Rica (FONOTICA)	14
Ecuador (Monitor Latino)	15
Ecuador (Ecuador Songs)	2
Spain (Top 100 Canciones)	2
Global (Billboard Global 200)	29
Global (Billboard Global 200 Excl. US)	16
Guatemala (Monitor Latino)	19
Honduras (Monitor Latino)	15
Italy (FIMI)	40
Mexico (Mexico Songs)	4
Nicaragua (Monitor Latino)	12
Paraguay (Monitor Latino)	9
Peru (Monitor Latino)	6
Peru (Peru Songs)	5
Peru (Peru Total Streams)	9
US Hot Latin Songs (Billboard)	24

=== Monthly charts ===
Monthly chart performance for "Una Noche en Medellín"
Chart (2022)	Peak position
Argentina (CAPIF)	4
Paraguay (SGP)	8
Uruguay (CUD)	3

=== Year-end charts ===
2022 year-end chart performance for "Una Noche En Medellín"
Chart (2022)	Position
Global 200 (Billboard)	123
Spain (PROMUSICAE)	23

=== Certifications ===
Certifications for "Una Noche en Medellín"
Region	Certification	Certified units/sales
France (SNEP)	Gold	100,000^{‡}
Italy (FIMI)	2× Platinum	200,000^{‡}
Spain (Promusicae)	4× Platinum	240,000^{‡}
United States (RIAA)	4× Platinum (Latin)	240,000^{‡}
^{‡} Sales+streaming figures based on certification alone.

== Una Noche en Medellín (Remix) ==
"Una Noche en Medellín (Remix)"

Song by Karol G, Cris MJ and Ryan Castro

from the album Mañana Será Bonito (Bichota Season)
- Language: Spanish
- Released: August 11, 2023
- Recorded: 2022
- Genre: Reggaeton
- Length: 3:25
- Label: Bichota Records; Interscope
- Songwriters: Carolina Giraldo Navarro; Cristopher Álvarez; Bryan Castro; Francisco Burgos
- Producers: Fran C; Ovy on the Drums

Visualizer
- "Una Noche en Medellín (Remix)" on YouTube

On August 11, 2023, Colombian singer Karol G released a remix of the song alongside Cris MJ and Colombian singer Ryan Castro, as the sixth track on her second mixtape project, Mañana Será Bonito (Bichota Season).

=== Background ===
The release of "Una Noche en Medellín (Remix)" was first confirmed by Karol G on March 21, 2022, through an Instagram video teasing her verse and confirming the addition of Ryan Castro.

Soon after, controversy broke out when American singer De La Ghetto posted an Instagram video showing a verse he had for a different remix of the song, stating: "They want to take me off the remix, I can't let this happen." Cris MJ responded on the same post it was not up to him, stating: "That's not what happened brother, it's out of my hands. To the people that think it's up to me, it's not like that. It's up to the big leagues."

Later Karol G confirmed that her and her team had decided to not move forward with the remix, stating she was unaware of other artists and other remixes in the talks. She added: "I would like to clarify that at no time was I aware that other artists had recorded and that apparently there were several remixes discussed until two days ago when I announced it. My team and I value and respect the work of my colleagues, and although I love the project and hate that this type of things happen, we have decided not to move forward with the [release of the song].

For his part, MJ responded to De la Ghetto, saying that it was not his responsibility and that the decision was made by the Stars Music Chile label, which supported what MJ stated and claimed that the American artist was not part of the remix due to "a major industry decision," but then he deleted the statement.

In June 2022, in an interview for Los 40 radio in Colombia, Ryan Castro revealed that the remixed version of the song originally included MJ, Karol and him, but that the label decided to incorporate De la Ghetto. Due to the fact that the label did not notify the presence of another artist in the remix, Karol G made the decision not to publish the remix, despite not having any problem with De la Ghetto. The following month, in an interview by Chilean journalist Diego González, MJ announced that the remix would be released, although he did not confirm who the artists would be participating in.

On February 19, 2023, Cris MJ and Karol G performed the song live during the LXII Viña del Mar International Song Festival in Chile, teasing the release of the song. On August 7, 2023, Karol G revealed the tracklist for her second mixtape, Mañana Será Bonito (Bichota Season), which included "Una Noche en Medellín (Remix)" with the participation of Cris MJ and Ryan Castro, as the sixth track. The song was officially released on August 11, 2023, alongside the mixtape's release.

=== Commercial performance ===
"Una Noche en Medellín (Remix)" debuted at number 68 on the US Billboard Hot 100 chart dated August 26, 2023. It became Cris MJ first entry on the chart.

On the US Billboard Hot Latin Songs chart dated August 26, 2023, the song debuted at number 12.

On the Billboard Global 200 the song debuted at number 68 on the chart dated August 26, 2023.

=== Awards and nominations ===
Awards and nominations for "Una Noche en Medellín (Remix)"
Year	Ceremony	Category	Result	Ref.
2024	Lo Nuestro Awards	Remix of the Year	Won	

=== Live performances ===
Cris MJ and Karol G performed the song live for the first time during the LXII Viña del Mar International Song Festival in Chile on February 19, 2023, months before its release. From August 10, 2023, to July 23, 2024, Karol G embarked on the arena-stadium Mañana Será Bonito Tour, where "Una Noche en Medellín (Remix)" was present throughout the set list. On September 7, 2023, Giraldo and Ryan Castro performed the song on the Mañana Será Bonito Tour during her East Rutherford, New Jersey shows at MetLife Stadium.

=== Charts ===
==== Weekly charts ====
Weekly chart performance for "Una Noche En Medellín (Remix)"
Chart (2023)	Peak position
Chile (Billboard)	3
Colombia (Billboard)	7
Ecuador (Billboard)	24
Global 200 (Billboard)	68
Nicaragua (Monitor Latino)	17
Spain (Promusicae)	62
US Billboard Hot 100	68
US Hot Latin Songs (Billboard)	12

==== Year-end charts ====
Year-end chart performance for "Una Noche en Medellín (Remix)"
Chart (2023)	Position
US Hot Latin Songs (Billboard)	100

=== Certifications ===
Certifications for "Una Noche en Medellín (Remix)"
Region	Certification	Certified units/sales
Spain (Promusicae)	Gold	30,000^{‡}
United States (RIAA)	7× Platinum (Latin)	420,000^{‡}
^{‡} Sales+streaming figures based on certification alone.

== Release history ==
Region	Date	Format(s)	Label	Ref.
Various	January 20, 2022	Digital download • streaming	Nabru Records • Stars Music Chile	
