= Red Bull Batalla de los Gallos =

Spanish worldwide Freestyle tournament

- Status: Active
- Genre: Freestyle rap
- Frequency: Annually
- Countries: Spain, Argentina, Perù, Mexico, Colombia, Chile, Venezuela, Dominican Republic
- Years active: 2005-Present
- Inaugurated: 2nd October 2005
- Founder: Red Bull
- Most recent: 11th April 2026
- Previous event: Red Bull Batalla Nueva Historia
- Next event: Red Bull Batalla Internacional 2026
- Participants: 16
- Website: https://www.redbull.com/es-es/event-series/red-bull-batalla

Red Bull Batalla de Los Gallos (Spanish: "Battle of the roosters" literally, or colloquially "Battle of the tough guys") or known as Red Bull Batalla, is an annual freestyle competition that takes place worldwide in Spanish-speaking countries. It began on October 2, 2005 and as of April 22, 2026, will return in April 2027 in Peru. The event is considered a prestigious Freestyle competition due to the skill of competitors and its historical importance. The event has also helped artists to launch their music careers, such as Wos, Aczino and Skone. Batalla has also inspired the foundation of other Freestyle competitions. The event is hosted live, for free, on YouTube and Red Bull TV, with no geographical restrictions.

== History ==
=== Beginnings (2005–2009) ===
Following the release of Eminem's 8 Mile film, which had grown the popularity of Rap and Freestyle and demonstrated their profitability, the idea of Batalla was formed in 2002. The event was founded in 2005 as Red Bull Batalla, as a "road to the final" style of event, during which artists from participating countries would compete in a National event to qualify for the final International event. At the final, all the rappers who had qualified would compete on the big stage at once. The first event was on the 30th of September 2005 in Venezuela, and the first International final was in Puerto Rico, on the 2nd of October 2005. This first final was set at the Club Gallístico with eight participants, and was won by Argentinian Rapper Frescolate, beating Eric el Nino. The event was considered a success, garnering a large audience, leading Red Bull and the crew to make the event annual. The number of participants and countries grew over time, with the first female contestant, Kim, competing in 2007.

=== Temporary shutdown (2009–2012) ===
In 2009, Red Bull announced that the 2009 event would be the final time the competition was being staged, and called it "La Batalla Final". This event was smaller than the previous four tournaments, and it only contained three rounds, unlike the four rounds included previously. Noult beat Mcklopedia to win in the final - a second final loss in a row for Mcklopedia. The event would then return after a three-year break in 2012 with an album entitled: "Solo Los Mejores Improvisan"

=== Refoundation and success (2013) ===
In 2012, Redbull released an album titled "Solo Los Mejores Improvisan" (Spanish: "Only the Best Improvise"), composed of songs by previous winners. Batalla returned for its first event following the shutdown four years prior, in Argentina. The event returned to the inaugural format, with eight participants and three phases. The event was won by hometown Argentinian Dtoke, who beat Mexican Jony Beltran in the final. In 2014, the event included a third place play-off for the first time. This was an additional phase in which those who had lost in the semi-finals would compete to be crowned as the bronze medalists/ given the third place podium. Following this resurgence, the event has grown in popularity across non-competing countries, such as America and Italy. It has also seen an increase in viewership, including in live audience, with the 2016 edition in Perù obtaining a record of 25 million spectators. For the 2020 event, due to the COVID-19 Pandemic, there was no live audience, and the event was behind closed doors. In 2023, an offshoot event titled "Red Bull Batalla 5 Vidas" was created, in which ex-champions and ex-contestants of the event competed in a one night elimination tournament, with each contestant having five lives. The winner is the final rapper to retain at least one of their five lives, winning the belt. In 2025, the event celebrated its 20 years milestone.

== Rules ==
The competition revolves around two contestants competing face to face. In each phase, the contestants are drafted with an opponent. Once the contestants arrive on stage, the host of the event announces the topic of the "diss" to deliver to the opponent. The topic must be respected, and cannot be diverted. In the final stage of the battle, the contestants are all given one minute to say whatever they would like, regardless of the topic. A panel of judges then decide on the winner. The rules of the competition are set out below:

1. The event has four phases, with the winner of each match moving on to the next round.
2. The topic given to the competitors by the host must be satisfied and cannot be changed or modified in any way.
3. No hands and no punches can be used.
4. If the contestants lose the semi-final, they will go on to the third place play-off against the other losing semi-finalist.
5. The finale follows the same structure as the previous stages, but in the final stage, there is no topic specified. Judges vote on the competitors, with the winner being the competitor who received the majority of the votes. If the vote is tied, it is repeated until a majority is reached.

== Editions ==
Throughout the events' history, there have been a total of 18 editions, with 19 champions crowned. The latest one was held in Chile on 11 April 2026.

=== List of editions and winners ===
NOTE: This only includes the international finals, not the national qualifiers.

Year	Champion	Runner-up	Host Country
2005	Frescolate Argentina	El Niño Mexico	Puerto Rico
2006	Rayden Spain	Tek One Puerto Rico	Colombia
2007	Link One Puerto Rico	Jay Co Dominican Republic	Venezuela
2008	Hadrian Mexico	Mena Colombia	Mexico
2009	Noult Spain	Mcklopedia Venezuela	Spain
2013	Dtoke Argentina	Jony B Mexico	Argentina
2014	Invert Spain	Kaiser Chile	Spain
2015	Arkano Spain	Tom Crowley Chile	Chile
2016	Skone Spain	Jota Peru	Peru
2017	Aczino Mexico	Wos Argentina	Mexico
2018	Wos Argentina	Aczino Mexico	Argentina
2019	Bnet Spain	Valles-T Colombia	Spain
2020	Rapder Mexico	Skone Spain	Dominican Republic
2021	Aczino Mexico	Skone Spain	Chile
2022	Aczino Mexico	Gazir Spain	Mexico
2023	Chuty Spain	Fat N Colombia	Colombia
2024	Chuty & Gazir^{1} Spain		Spain
2025^{2}	Fat N Colombia	Bnet Spain	Argentina
2026^{2}	El Menor Chile	Almendrades Perú	Chile

^{1}At first Chuty was declared the winner, but finally, investigating the jury's voting intentions, the tournament organizers themselves declared Chuty and Gazir as the winners .

^{2}Because it was the 20th anniversary, a commemorative event was held in 2025 instead of an international final.

=== Red Bull Batalla 5 Vidas ===
Edition	Date and Time	Host	Winner	Second Place	Third Place
Primera edición	Wednesday, October 11, 2023, 16:00	Bogotá, Colombia	Marithea (Colombia)	Gazir (Spain)	Skone (Spain
Segunda edición	Wednesday, February 7, 2024, 23:00		Mecha (Argentina)	Chuty (Spain)	Jota (Peru)
Tercera edición	Wednesday, June 19, 2024, 18:00	Argentina	Jesse Pungaz (Argentina)	MNAK (Spain)	Papo (Argentina)
Cuarta edición	Wednesday, November 6, 2024, 18:00	Anfiteatro Pablo Neruda, Santiago, Chile	Lokillo (Colombia)	Metalingüistica (Chile)	Kaiser (Chile)
Edición 20 años de rimas	Wednesday, January 29 2025, 22:00	Madrid, Spain	MCKlopedia (Venezuela)	Piezas (Spain)	Frescolate (Argentina)
Súper 5 vidas	Saturday, October 18, 2025, 18:00	Bogotá, Colombia	Mecha (Argentina)	Lokillo (Colombia)	Marithea (Colombia)

Aczino and Chuty are so far the only two winners to have won the event twice in a row, while Skone and Mckclopedia are the only two contestants in history to lose two finals in a row.

== Aczino VS Wos ==
A well known feud in the history of the event was the face off between Argentinian Wos and Mexican Aczino. Their first meeting was at the 2017 Red Bull Batalla de los Gallos in Mexico. At the time, Wos was still new to professional freestyling, having competed in the primary school of Freestyle and later to be cult classic "El Quinto Escalon" while he was still young. However, during the national Red Bull Batalla in Argentina, he demonstrated skill in being able to rhyme well with the flow and be able to comeback naturally. While Aczino had competed in the previous three editions of the event, he hadn't achieved significant success. Both artists were favourites to reach the final, which they did go on to do. The finale has been remembered for being a cutthroat battle for the title, and in the end, Aczino won the title in his hometown Mexico. A year later in Wos's hometown, Wos won the title, with the line: "You tell me you'll win, I can't hear you. If I win either way, it won't change a thing. Whoever loses will leave with pride, that's the difference between your country and mine!" That line led Wos to win the event with four out of four votes. In 2019, Wos stated that he would retire from Freestyle competitions to focus on his music career, however he competed in the Double AA. Wos met Aczino in the semifinal, and beat him to win the 2018 title. The two met again in the first part of the 2019 God Level in Mexico, and Wos lose to Aczino for the second time, before meeting him in his final Red Bull Batalla in 2019, where he would for the first time in his career be knocked out in the first stage of a competition. After that, Wos would leave the stage, while Aczino would go on to win more titles in various other freestyle competitions. This 2019 fight is the most viewed fight of the entire Red Bull Batalla event's history.

== Reception and Legacy ==
The event has often been praised for the intense on-stage atmosphere, the variety in topics for the battles and the charisma and energy of the hosts. The cultural importance of the event has also been noted, with many battles being watched by millions and the event consistently reaching millions of viewers live on YouTube and Red Bull TV. The event has also been the inspiration for many future freestyle competitions, such as God Level Fest and Freestyle Master Series, since Red Bull Batalla was the first ever mainstream attempt at making Freestyle competitive. It has also been praised for allowing multiple countries to participate in the event, creating a worldwide competition. Red Bull Droppa, an Italian music producer channel, has brought the 2016 champion Skone and Italian Higher to freestyle live on stage. All events of the competition are widely available online and have been archived on YouTube in full since its inaugural edition in 2005.
