= Jere Klein =

- Born: Jeremías Tobar Llevul; 4 March 2006 (age 19); Santiago, Chile
- Genres: Reguetón; Latin trap y RKT
- Occupation: Singer; Composer
- Instrument: Voice
- Years active: 2020–present
- Labels: Lotus Records
- Website: www.jereklein.cl

Jeremías Tobar Llevul (born 4 March 2006), known artistically as Jere Klein, is a Chilean singer and composer of reguetón, RKT and latin trap music. He debuted in 2020 with the single titled "Me la busqué", along with Bayriton, Dylan el Menor and Ortega de la M.

== Career ==
Jere Klein was born in Santiago de Chile in the Santa Anita village of the Lo Prado commune and from a young age expressed his interest in music and the urban genre. From the age of 14, he released only remixes of mambos and made appearances in music videos of the genre. In 2020 he collaborated with Bayriton, Dylan el Menor and Ortega de la M. on the single "Me la busqué". That same year, together with his friend Jairo Vera and the musicians Bayriton and Lushito FlowMii, he worked on the song "Puesto para la Acción".

After a dozen collaborations with various artists from the Chilean urban scene such as Drakomafia, Basty Corvalán and Yeinomercy, among others, in 2022 he achieved greater recognition with his song "Estoy volando alto", and became known through TikTok on which his song "Mándame tu ubi" was a trend, attracting attention for his voice and young age.

In 2023, his EP 6.5 released with collaborations from various artists such as King Savagge. Jere Klein reached number one on the Spotify charts through 6.5 thanks to the song "Dos hielos". In May of the same year he released the single "Una en un millón" and, later in June, he published the single "Mi bruja" with Drakomafia. On August 10, 2023 he performed alongside Argentine singer Nicki Nicole on the song "X ESO BB", while on December 1 of the same year he released his first album titled Énfasis, where he released his song "Ando", passing 300 million views on YouTube. Énfasis featured collaborations such as Nickoog Clk, Cris MJ, El Bai, and Lucky Brown. Jere Klein performed a live presentation of Énfasis at the Teatro Caupolicán in Santiago, and the album received more than three million views in a single day, becoming the best historical debut by a Chilean on the Spotify platform.

He made an appearance on the Billboard Global 200 list with the song "Ando" in January 2024, which also appeared on the Billboard Global Excl. U.S. list along with "Princesita De..." in February.

== Personal life ==
On December 22, 2022, Klein got into a fight with singer Jairo Vera prior to the start of the La Junta Awards. The video in which both appear beating each other went viral on social media, the reasons behind the conflict being unknown.

In June 2023, Klein was detained by police after a vehicle stop by the Carabineros de Chile in which a 30-gram bag of marijuana was detected. Due to being underage, Jere Klein was subject to the National Minor Service (SENAME) of Chile.

== Discography ==
=== Studio albums ===
- 2023: Énfasis

=== EPs ===
- 2023: 6.5
- 2024: Ares Klein

=== Singles ===
Year	Title	Album
2020	"Me la busqué" (with Bayriton, Dylan el Menor and Ortega de la M.)	s/a
2020	"Puesto para la acción" (with Jairo Vera, Bayriton and Lushito FlowMii)	s/a
2021	"Libertad" (with Drakomafia, Basty Corvalán and Z Jocker)	s/a
2021	"Louis Vuitton" (with Basty Corvalán)	s/a
2021	"Mi fanática" (with Jairo Vera and Bayriton)	s/a
2021	"Bye Bye" (with Basty Corvalán, Yeinomercy, Nickyvoice, Diesztro K.O., Kriz Flow and Dimeloyatu)	s/a
2021	"Estoy volando alto"	s/a
2022	"Rockstar"	s/a
2022	"38" (with El Rey)	El Subestimado
2022	"Mándame tu ubi" (with Lucky Brown)	s/a
2022	"Ese corte" (with Balbi El Chamako)	s/a
2022	"Por ti" (with Basty Corvalán)	s/a
2022	"Muñeca" (with Marcianeke)	s/a
2022	"Hecha en Cali" (with Yabel, Marcianeke, Los Bandidos and Basty Corvalán)	s/a
2022	"Los Diablotes" (with ITHAN NY)	s/a
2023	"Hasta mañana" (with Tunechikidd)	s/a
2023	"Dos Hielos" (with King Savagge)	WorKING
2023	"Ya no pienso en ti"	s/a
2023	"Rockstars" (with Gabo El Chamaquito and El BAI)	s/a
2023	"Vengo de la Brea" (with Lucky Brown and Valdi)	s/a
2023	"6.5"	6.5
2023	"XQ tan sola?" (with Nickoog Clk)	Giro 180
2023	"Ibiza" (with Balbi El Chamako and El BAI)	s/a
2023	"Millonarios juntos" (with ITHAN NY)	s/a
2023	"Una en un millón"	Énfasis
2023	"Mi bruja" (with Drakomafia)	Énfasis
2023	"Padres" (with Shishigang Records, ITHAN NY, Tunechikidd, Aqua VS and Pablo Chill-E)	s/a
2023	"X eso BB" (with Nicki Nicole)	Énfasis
2023	"Ando" (with Gittobeatz)	Énfasis
2023	"24/7 6.5" (with YSY A and ONIRIA)	Al after del after
2023	"Loca farandulera" (with Cris MJ)	Énfasis
2024	"No hay 14F"	s/a
	"Bastardo" (with Pablo Chill-e and Ñengo Flow	Los Gangsters También lloran

== Awards and nominations ==
Year	Award	Category	Receiver	Result	Ref(s)
2023	Premios Musa	Song of the year	"X eso BB" (with Nicki Nicole)	Winner	
2023	Premios Musa	Collaboration of the year	"X eso BB" (with Nicki Nicole)	Nominated	
2023	Copihue de Oro	Best urban artist	Jere Klein	Nominated	
