= Milo J: Bzrp Music Sessions, Vol. 57 =

Single by Bizarrap and Milo J

from the EP En Dormir Sin Madrid
- Language: Spanish
- Released: October 4, 2023
- Genre: Latin trap; pop rap
- Length: 3:10
- Label: Dale Play
- Songwriters: Gonzalo Julián Conde; Camilo Joaquín Villarroel; Santiago Álvarado
- Producer: Bizarrap

Bizarrap singles chronology
"Remember Me" (2023)	"Milo J: Bzrp Music Sessions, Vol. 57" (2023)	"Young Miko: Bzrp Music Sessions, Vol. 58" (2024)

Milo J singles chronology
"Rincón" (2023)	"Milo J: Bzrp Music Sessions, Vol. 57" (2023)	"Una Bala" (2023)

Music video
- "Milo J: Bzrp Music Sessions, Vol. 57" on YouTube

"Milo J: Bzrp Music Sessions, Vol. 57" (Note: Alternatively known as "Hoy Me Voy al Sol".) is a song by Argentine producer Bizarrap and Argentine rapper and singer Milo J. It was released on October 4, 2023, through Dale Play Records as the lead single from Bizarrap and Milo J's first extended play En Dormir Sin Madrid. At 16 years old, Milo J is the youngest artist to be featured on a Bizarrap's music session so far. It is also the first Bizarrap session to be included on an album.

== Background and release ==
On 28 September 2023, Bizarrap announced in an eight-minute clip titled "Bizapop" that his new "Bzrp Music Sessions" was scheduled to be released on 4 October 2023. The video starred Bizarrap and fellow Argentine actors Guillermo Francella and Gastón Cocchiarale. It showed the producer celebrating the 8.5 billion streams on Spotify milestone with some office co-workers. The video referenced the 2013 American epic biographical black comedy crime film The Wolf of Wall Street which starred Leonardo DiCaprio and was directed by Martin Scorsese ten years before. However, Bizarrap had not yet revealed who would collaborate with him on the fifty-seventh volume of his famous Music Sessions, generating high anticipation and speculation. Among the rumoured names, some people thought that Canadian singer Justin Bieber would participate on the song. At the same time, it was heavily rumoured that the surprise collaborator would be a huge Latin pop artist like Belinda or Lali due to the alleged switch to pop music. On 2 October 2023, just two days before its release, Bizarrap officially confirmed that his fifty-seventh Music Session would feature Argentine singer Milo J.

== Music video ==
The music video was released along with the single on October 4, 2023 via Bizarrap's YouTube channel.

The video is made up of 5 chapters of different songs titled "Toy en el Mic", "No Soy Eterno", "Fruto" and "Penas de Antaño" which were released simultaneously with the session on the same day, for the release of Bizarrap's first EP on the same day, En Dormir Sin Madrid.

== Charts ==
=== Weekly charts ===
Chart performance for "Milo J: Bzrp Music Sessions, Vol. 57"
Chart (2023)	Peak position
Argentina Hot 100 (Billboard)	1
Bolivia (Billboard)	2
Colombia (Billboard)	9
Costa Rica (FONOTICA)	1
Chile (Billboard)	5
Ecuador (Billboard)	4
Global 200 (Billboard)	31
Peru (Billboard)	3
Spain (PROMUSICAE)	2

=== Monthly charts ===
Chart (2023)	Peak position
Paraguay (SGP)	98

== Certifications ==
Certifications for "Milo J: Bzrp Music Sessions, Vol. 57"
Region	Certification	Certified units/sales
Spain (Promusicae)	Gold	30,000^{‡}
^{‡} Sales+streaming figures based on certification alone.
