= Recuerdos (Nicki Nicole album) =

2019 studio album by Nicki Nicole

Studio album by Nicki Nicole
- Released: November 8, 2019
- Genre: Latin trap; pop; R&B
- Length: 36:57
- Label: Dale Play
- Producer: Mauro de Tommaso; Gonzalo Ferreyra; Nico Cotton; Orodembow; Bizarrap

Nicki Nicole chronology
Recuerdos (2019)	Parte de Mí (2021)

Singles from Recuerdos
- 1. "Wapo Traketero" Released: April 26, 2019; 2. "Años Luz" Released: August 23, 2019; 3. "Fucking Diablo" Released: October 9, 2019; 4. "Diva" Released: November 8, 2019

Recuerdos (transl. Memories) is the debut studio album by Argentine rapper Nicki Nicole. It was released on November 8, 2019, via Dale Play Records. The album features artists such as Cazzu and Duki, and features Bizarrap's production on the song "Plegarias".

== Background ==
After the international impact she had with producer Bizarrap in his Music Sessions, which obtained the approval of other artists in the country such as Duki, Cazzu, Khea, among others. Nicole confirmed the existence of the album on November 5, 2019, in an Instagram story.

== Promotion ==
=== Singles ===
On April 26, 2019, Nicole released the first single from the album, "Wapo Traketero", the music video for the song was directed by Cecilia Sarmiento. After the release of the Music Sessions with producer Bizarrap, Nicole confirmed on Twitter that she would be releasing a new song on August 23, 2019.

"Años Luz" was released as the second single on August 23, its music video managed to reach the top of YouTube in Argentina setting a trend and managed to enter the top 40 of the Billboard Argentina Hot 100 chart.

On October 9, 2019, Nicole released the song "Fucking Diablo" as a third single, which also made her debut in the top 40 of the Argentina Hot 100.

On November 8, 2019, he released "Diva" as the fourth single in conjunction with the album. The video was directed by the renowned Argentine director Facundo Ballve with the production of Anestesia Audiovisual.

== Track listing ==
Recuerdos track listing
No.	Title	Writer(s)	Producer(s)	Length
1.	"7 Lunas"	Nicole Cucco; Mauro de Tomasso	Mauro de Tomasso	3:27
2.	"Cómo Dímelo" (with Cazzu)	Cucco; Julieta Emilia Cazzuchelli; de Tommaso	Mauro de Tomasso	3:20
3.	"Nos Encontramos"	Cucco; Gonzalo Ferreyra	Mauro de Tomasso; Gonzalo Ferreyra; Nico Cotton	2:37
4.	"Tras Vos"	Cucco; de Tomasso	Mauro de Tomasso; Nico Cotton	2:50
5.	"Diva"	Cucco; de Tomasso	Mauro de Tomasso; Nico Cotton	3:20
6.	"Shorty" (with Duki)	Cucco; Mauro Ezequiel Lombardo; Roque Ferrari	Orodembow	3:25
7.	"Recuerdos"	Cucco; de Tomasso	Mauro de Tomasso; Nico Cotton	2:50
8.	"Me Gusta"	Cucco; Ferreyra	Mauro de Tomasso; Nico Cotton; Gonzalo Ferreyra	3:08
9.	"Plegarias" (with Bizarrap)	Cucco; Gonzalo Julián Conde	Bizarrap	3:18
10.	"Wapo Traketero"	Cucco	Gonzalo Ferreyra	3:01
11.	"Años Luz"	Cucco	Gonzalo Ferreyra	3:13
12.	"Fucking Diablo"	Cucco	Mauro de Tomasso; Nico Cotton; Gonzalo Ferreyra	2:24
Total length:				36:57

== Charts ==
Chart (2020)	Peak position
Spanish Albums (Promusicae)	81

== Release history ==
Region	Date	Format	Label	Ref.
Worldwide	November 8, 2019	Digital download; streaming	Dale Play	
