= Cris MJ =

Chilean singer-songwriter (born 2001)

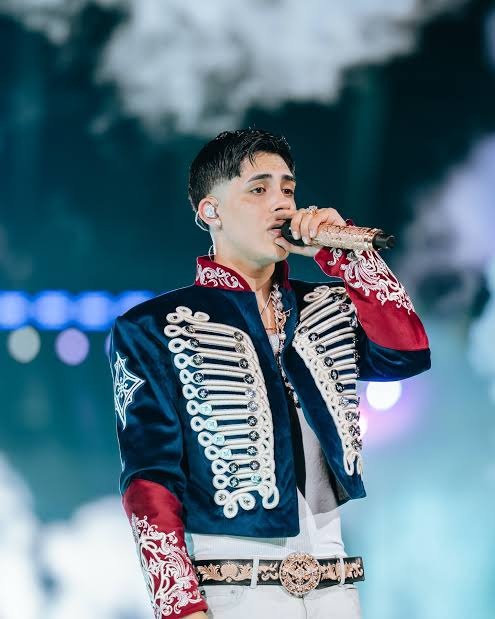
- Cris MJ in 2026

Background information
- Born: Christopher Andrés Álvarez García; 16 September 2001 (age 25); La Serena, Chile
- Genre: Reggaeton
- Occupations: Singer; songwriter
- Years active: 2019–present
- Labels: Stars Chile; Rimas

Christopher Andrés Álvarez García (born 16 September 2001), known professionally as Cris MJ, is a Chilean reggaeton singer and songwriter. He gained international fame for his hit single "Una Noche en Medellín" (2022) and its eventual remix (2023) featuring Colombian singers Karol G and Ryan Castro, which peaked at number 68 on the Billboard Hot 100.

Álvarez later collaborated with Standly on "Marisola" in July 2022, with a remix with Argentine artists Duki and Nicki Nicole being released months later, which also had considerable success. In 2024, he again rose to worldwide fame after collaborating with FloyyMenor on "Gata Only", which achieved success within song charts globally. Following the song's success, Álvarez would release "Si No Es Contigo" in May 2024, which also attained virality in the United States.

== Career ==
He began his musical career in 2020 as Cris MJ, which is named after his first name and his father's friend group, who were called "Mala Junta". He began independently releasing several singles and collaborations with other artists within the Chilean urbano scene, later announcing that he would release his debut studio album in 2021, releasing more singles, including "Locura y Maldad" ('madness and evil') and "Los Malvekes".

In January 2022, he released the single "Una Noche en Medellín" ('A Night In Medellín'), which went viral on the social platform TikTok and appeared on international music charts. In February 2022, he performed at the Summer Fest 2022, later embarking his first tour, with dates in Mexico and Colombia, among other countries.

After this early success, Cris MJ would be featured in other collaborations, including "Yo No Me Olvido" ('I don't forget') with Gotay, "Sextime" with Polimá Westcoast and Young Cister and "Me Arrepentí" ('I regretted it') with Ak4:20 y Pailita, and soon was the most-streamed Chilean artist on Spotify.

On 2 February 2024, he collaborated with FloyyMenor on the single "Gata Only", after Cris MJ reached out to the artist, proposing that he should contribute to the song. The single appeared on international song charts, including the US Billboard Hot 100 at number 27.

== Discography ==
=== Albums ===
- Welcome to My World (2022)
- Partyson (2023)
- Apocalipsis (2025)
- LAS FILTRADAS (2025)

=== Singles ===
List of singles, with selected chart positions, showing year released and album name
Title	Year	Peak chart positions										Certifications	Album
Title	Year	CHI	ARG	COL	ECU	MEX	PER	SPA	US	US Latin	WW	Certifications	Album
"Los Malvekes" (with Marcianeke and Simon la Letra)	2021	5	—	—	—	—	—	—	—	—	—		Non-album singles
"Una Noche en Medellín" (solo or remix with Karol G and Ryan Castro)	2022	1	22	11	2	4	5	2	68	25	29	PROMUSICAE: 4× Platinum; PROMUSICAE: Gold (Remix); RIAA: 4× Platinum (Latin)	Non-album singles
"Dime Tú" (with Pailita)	2022	2	—	—	—	—	—	—	—	—	—		Non-album singles
"Como Te Va"	2022	13	—	—	—	—	—	—	—	—	—		Non-album singles
"Me Arrepentí" (with Ak4:20 and Pailita)	2022	1	—	—	—	—	—	—	—	—	—		Non-album singles
"Marisola" (with Standly and Stars Music Chile or remix with Duki and Nicki Nicole)	2022	1	1	—	21	—	1	20	—	—	70	PROMUSICAE: 2× Platinum	Non-album singles
"Llamame Bebe" (with Pailita and Young Cister)	2023	1	—	—	—	—	—	—	—	—	—		Non-album singles
"Mi Facha"	2023	—	—	—	—	—	—	—	—	—	—		Non-album singles
"Se Te Hace Tarde"	2023	—	—	—	—	—	—	—	—	—	—		Non-album singles
"Salió de Noche" (with Ak4:20)	2023	—	—	—	—	—	—	—	—	—	—		Non-album singles
"Su Altura"	2023	10	—	—	—	—	—	—	—	—	—		Non-album singles
"Adictivo" (with Kali BRL and Nes)	2023	—	—	—	—	—	—	—	—	—	—		Non-album singles
"Cómo Tú Estás" (with Benji la Maldita Escritura de Oro)	2023	—	—	—	—	—	—	—	—	—	—		Non-album singles
"Ando Buscando"	2023	22	—	—	—	—	—	—	—	—	—		Non-album singles
"Cris MJ | DJ Tao Turreo Sessions #20" (with DJ Tao)	2023	—	—	—	—	—	—	—	—	—	—		Non-album singles
"La Noche Está"	2023	8	—	—	—	—	—	—	—	—	—		Non-album singles
"Nalgas Rojas"	2023	—	—	—	—	—	—	—	—	—	—		Non-album singles
"333" (with Yan Block)	2023	13	—	—	—	—	—	—	—	—	—		Non-album singles
"Maullame"	2023	—	—	—	—	—	—	—	—	—	—		Non-album singles
"Partyson"	2023	11	—	—	—	—	—	—	—	—	—		Partyson
"Abriendo Puertas"	2023	—	—	—	—	—	—	—	—	—	—		Partyson
"Diabólica" (with Dei V)	2023	9	—	—	—	—	—	21	—	—	—	PROMUSICAE: Platinum	Partyson
"Mala" (with Pablo Chill-E)	2023	—	—	—	—	—	—	—	—	—	—		Partyson
"Mia Na' Más" (with Luar la L)	2023	—	—	—	—	—	—	—	—	—	—		Partyson
"Nos Conviene Más" (with Hades66)	2023	—	—	—	—	—	—	—	—	—	—		Partyson
"Loca Farandulera" (with Jere Klein)	2023	5	—	—	—	—	—	—	—	—	—		Énfasis
"+ Paca Más Elástico" (with Nes)	2023	—	—	—	—	—	—	—	—	—	—		Non-album single
"No Ando Weando"	2023	3	—	—	—	—	—	—	—	—	—		Partyson
"3 + 1" (with Nes)	2023	—	—	—	—	—	—	—	—	—	—		Non-album single
"Daytona"	2024	2	—	—	—	—	—	—	—	—	—		Partyson
"Gata Only" (with FloyyMenor)	2024	1	3	8	2	2	1	3	27	1	3	BPI: Silver; PROMUSICAE: 4× Platinum; RIAA: 2× Platinum	Non-album singles
"Ke La Castiguen" (with Louki)	2024	—	—	—	—	—	—	—	—	—	—		Non-album singles
"Que Hay Amor"	2024	4	—	—	—	—	—	—	—	—	—		Non-album singles
"Que Brille Sola Mami"	2024	—	—	—	—	—	—	—	—	—	—		Non-album singles
"Si No Es Contigo"	2024	1	—	—	—	—	—	31	72	3	37	PROMUSICAE: Gold	Non-album singles
"Rapido" (with Dei V)	2024	—	—	—	—	—	—	11	—	—	—	PROMUSICAE: Gold	Quién es Dei V?
"Vamo a Bailotear"	2025	—	—	—	—	—	—	—	—	28	46		Non-album single
"—" denotes a title that did not chart, or was not released in that territory.

== Awards and nominations ==
Name of the award ceremony, year presented, nominated work of the award, award category, and the result of the nomination
Award ceremony	Year	Nominated work(s)	Category	Result	Ref.
Heat Latin Music Awards	2024	Himself	Best Artist South Region	Nominated	
MTV MIAW Awards	2024	"Gata Only" (with FloyyMenor)	Viral Anthem	Nominated	
MTV MIAW Awards	2024	"Gata Only" (with FloyyMenor)	Supreme Perreo	Nominated	
