= Wos (musician) =

Argentine rapper (born 1998)

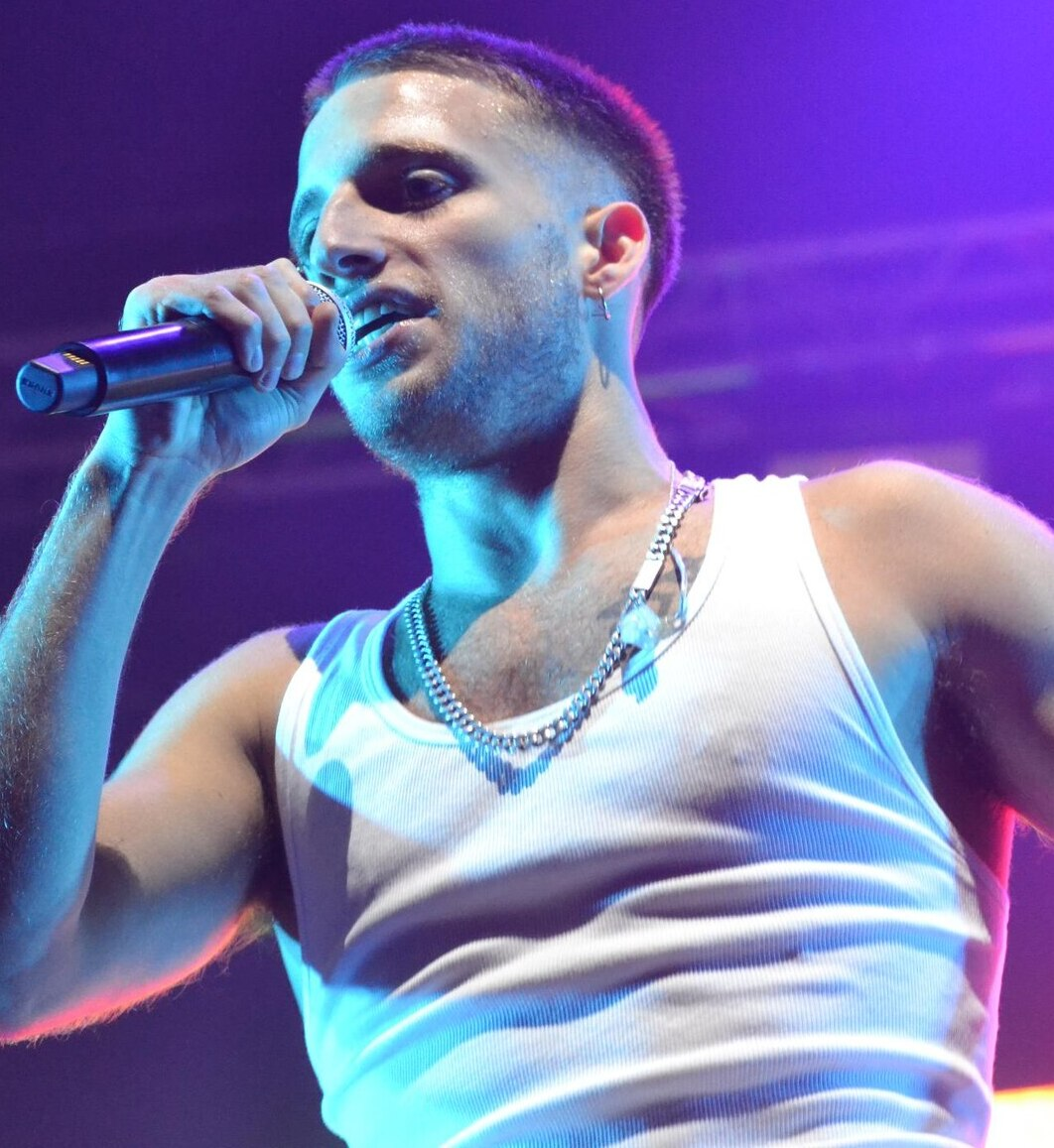
- Wos during a concert in Barcelona (2023)

Background information
- Born: Valentín Oliva; 23 January 1998 (age 28)
- Origin: Buenos Aires, Argentina
- Genres: Alternative hip-hop; Latin hip-hop; alternative rock; pop
- Occupations: Musician; singer; actor
- Instruments: Vocals; guitar; piano; drums
- Years active: 2012–present
- Label: Doguito Records

Valentín Oliva (born 23 January 1998), professionally known as Wos (stylized as WOS), is an Argentine singer, actor, and freestyler.

Starting as a freestyler, he won the Argentine competition of freestyle battle El Quinto Escalón on several occasions, achieving national recognition. He also won the FMS Argentina and the international tournament Red Bull Batalla de Gallos, both in 2018.

Following his success in freestyle battles, he decided to pursue a musical career. In 2018, he released his first single "Púrpura", while in 2019 he released his debut studio album Caravana. He has won several Gardel Awards and received a nomination for Best New Artist at the 21st Annual Latin Grammy Awards in 2020.

== Early life ==
Oliva's father, Alejandro Oliva, is a musician and founder of the group La Bomba de Tiempo, while his mother, Maia Mónaco, is a dancer and actress who was a part of the group El Diablo en la Boca. His parents' artistic influence led him to study piano and drums from a young age. He also studied acting at the Escuela Metropolitana de Arte Dramático in Buenos Aires. At 13, he was a part of the Argentine television channel Pakapaka appearing in various segments freestyling and playing the drums. During this time, he started to participate in freestyle battles, later inscribing himself in the competition El Quinto Escalón.

== Career ==
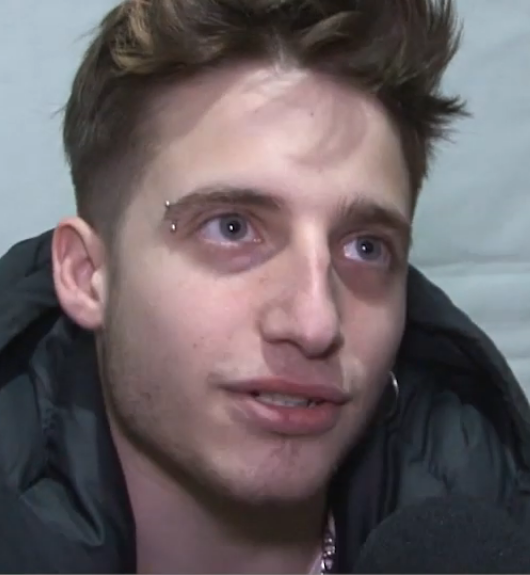
Wos in 2020

At 15, he participated for the first time in the Argentine freestyler competition El Quinto Escalón. He won the competition in 2016 and was runner-up in 2017. In 2017, he competed for the first time in the Red Bull Batalla de los Gallos competition, winning the national competition but losing the international one in the final against Mexican rapper Aczino in Ciudad de México, the next year he won the international competition in Buenos Aires. In 2018, he also won the competition FMS Argentina.

After announcing his retirement from freestyle competitions, he released in 2018 his first single "Púrpura" followed by "Andrómeda", both under the label Agencia Picante with production from LOUTA and Nico Cotto. In March 2019, he performed at the music festival Lollapalooza in Argentina.

On 9 August 2019, he released "Canguro" under the label Doguito Records, being the first single for his debut album. His album Caravana was released on 4 October 2019, consisting of seven songs it was premiered in two performances on 11 and 12 October at Groove, a venue in Buenos Aires. On 21 May 2020, he released the EP Tres puntos suspensivos, recorded during the quarantines due to the COVID-19 pandemic is composed of four songs including one with his brother, Manuel.

At the 21st Annual Latin Grammy Awards in 2020, WOS received a nomination for Best New Artist. The same year, at the Gardel Awards, he won Song of the Year and Best Urban/Trap Song or Album for "Canguro" and Best New Artist for Caravana. Also in 2020, he made appearances in the comedy webseries Almost Happy and the music docuseries BREAK IT ALL: The History of Rock in Latin America, both from Netflix.

On 4 November 2020, he released "Mugre" as the first single for his upcoming second studio album and on 17 December 2020, he released "Convoy Jarana" as the album's second single. On 18 November 2021, he released his second studio album titled Oscuro éxtasis.

In his album "DESCARTABLE" (2024), he collaborated with the emblematic Argentine rock singer Indio Solari, releasing the song “Quemarás”, a deep, slow, and melancholic ballad with a classic rock undertone.

== Discography ==
=== Studio albums ===
- Caravana (2019)
- Oscuro Éxtasis (2021)
- DESCARTABLE (2024)

=== Extended plays ===
- Tres puntos suspensivos (2020)

== Awards and nominations ==
Award	Year	Category	Nominated work	Result	Ref.
Latin Grammy Awards	2020	Best New Artist	Himself	Nominated	
Latin Grammy Awards	2022	Best Rock Song	"QUE SE MEJOREN"	Nominated	
Latin Grammy Awards	2022	Best Pop/Rock Song	"ARRANCARMELO"	Nominated	
Latin Grammy Awards	2022	Best Alternative Song	"Culpa" (with Ricardo Mollo)	Nominated	
Latin Grammy Awards	2023	Best Short Form Music Video	"DESCARTABLE"	Nominated	
Latin Grammy Awards	2024	Best Alternative Music Album	DESCARTABLE	Nominated	
Premios Gardel (Note: At the Gardel Awards of 2020, Facu Yalve received nominations for Record of the Year and Producer of the Year for his work in Caravana as both a producer and engineer while Martin Levi, Juan Sanchez, Stephen Thayalan and Lucila Taba won Best Cover Design as designers for Caravana. At the Gardel Awards of 2022, for their work in Oscuro Éxtasis, Javier Fracchia, Facundo Yalve and Nicolás Cotto won Best Recording Engineering, Yalve also was nominated for Producer of the Year and Alejandro Ros won Best Cover Design.)	2020	Album of the Year	Caravana	Nominated	
Premios Gardel	2020	Best New Artist	Caravana	Nominated	
Premios Gardel	2020	Best Urban/Trap Song or Album	Caravana	Nominated	
Premios Gardel	2020	Best Urban/Trap Song or Album	"Canguro"	Won	
Premios Gardel	2020	Song of the Year	"Canguro"	Won	
Premios Gardel	2020	Best Urban/Trap Collaboration	"Animal" (with ACRU)	Nominated	
Premios Gardel	2022	Album of the Year	Oscuro Éxtasis	Won	
Premios Gardel	2022	Best Alternative Rock Album	Oscuro Éxtasis	Won	
Premios Gardel	2022	Best Rock Song	"QUE SE MEJOREN"	Won	
Premios Gardel	2022	Best Urban Music Song	"Cambiando la Piel" (with Nicki Nicole)	Nominated	
Premios Gardel	2022	Best Urban Music Collaboration	"Cambiando la Piel" (with Nicki Nicole)	Won	
Premios Gardel	2023	Best Urban Music Song	"Quereme" (with Louta)	Nominated	
Premios Gardel	2023	Best Urban Music Collaboration	"Quereme" (with Louta)	Nominated	
Premios Gardel	2024	Song of the Year	"Investido" (with Evlay & Santiago Motorizado)	Nominated	
Premios Quiero	2019	Best Trap Video	"Canguro"	Won	
Premios Quiero	2022	Best Rap / Trap / Hip-Hop Video	"QUE SE MEJOREN"	Nominated	
Rolling Stone en Español Awards	2023	Video of the Year	"ARRANCÁRMELO"	Nominated	
