= Colocao =

2020 single by Nicki Nicole

Single by Nicki Nicole

from the album Parte de Mí
- Released: May 13, 2020
- Genre: Latin urban; Latin trap
- Length: 3:00
- Label: Dale Play; Sony Latin
- Songwriter(s): Nicole Denise Cucco; Gonzalo Julián Conde; Facundo Nahuel Yalve
- Producer(s): Bizarrap; Evlay

Nicki Nicole singles chronology
"Diva" (2019)	"Colocao" (2020)	"Mamichula" (2020)

Music video
- "Colocao" on YouTube

"Colocao" is a song by Argentine rapper Nicki Nicole. It was released on May 13, 2020 through Dale Play Records and Sony Music Latin. The song was produced by Argentine record producers Bizarrap and Evlay. The music video for the song was recorded at Nicki Nicole's house due to the COVID-19 pandemic, it was directed by Jess "La Pola" Praznik. The music video for the song has more than 100 million views on YouTube. The song reached number 6 on the Billboard Argentina Hot 100 chart and went gold in Argentina.

== Charts ==
Chart (2020)	Peak position
Argentina (Argentina Hot 100)	6
Argentina Airplay (Monitor Latino)	8
Spain (PROMUSICAE)	48

== Certifications ==
Region	Certification	Certified units/sales
Argentina (CAPIF)	2× Platinum	40,000^{*}
Mexico (AMPROFON)	Platinum	60,000^{‡}
Spain (PROMUSICAE)	Platinum	40,000^{‡}
United States (RIAA)	Platinum (Latin)	60,000^{‡}
^{*} Sales figures based on certification alone.^{‡} Sales+streaming figures based on certification alone.

== See also ==
- List of Billboard Argentina Hot 100 top-ten singles in 2021
