= Nicki Nicole =

Argentine rapper and singer-songwriter (born 2000)

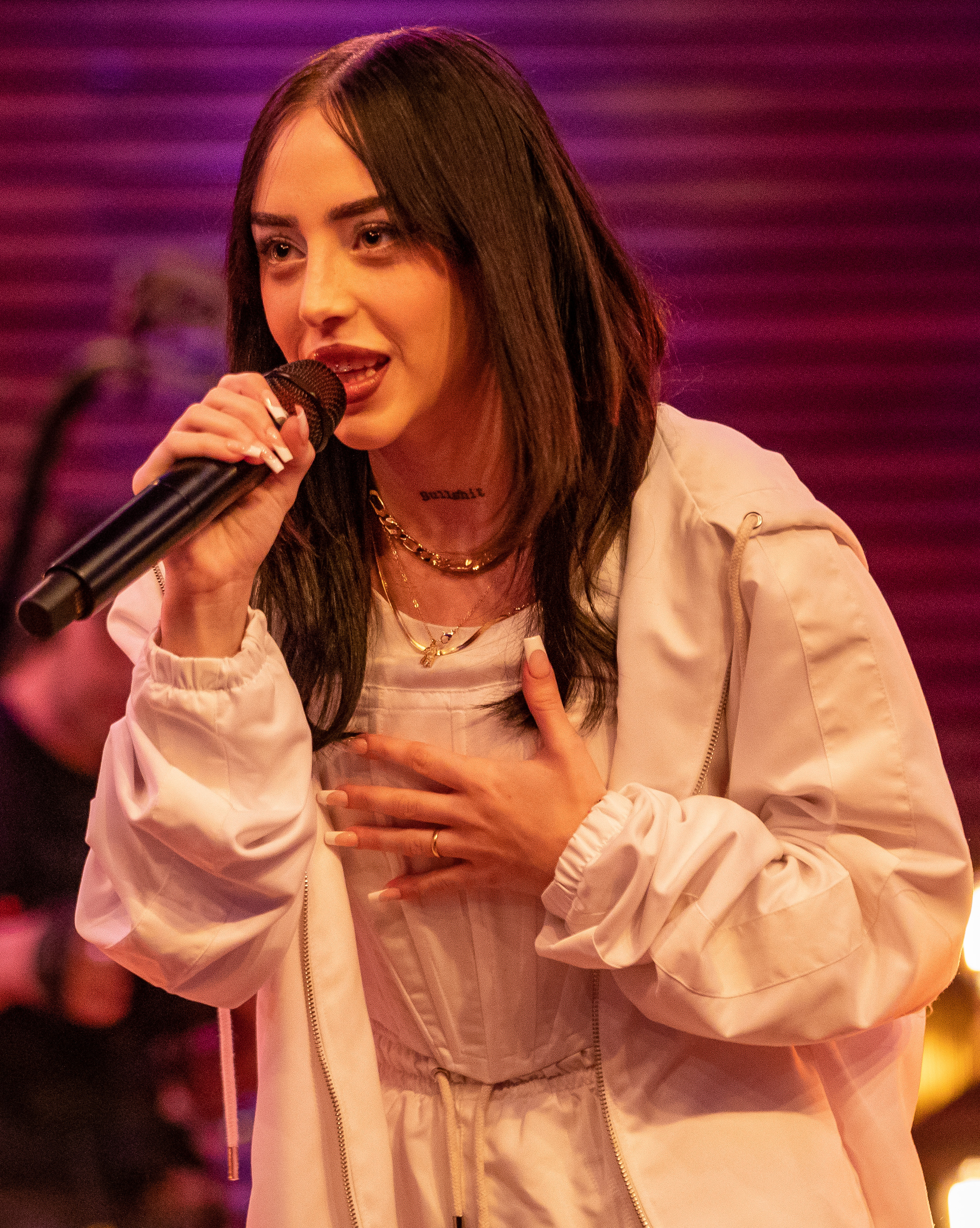
- Nicole in 2022

Background information
- Born: Nicole Denise Cucco; 25 August 2000 (age 26); Rosario, Santa Fe, Argentina
- Genres: Latin R&B; reggaeton; Latin hip-hop
- Occupations: Rapper; singer-songwriter
- Years active: 2019–present
- Labels: Dale Play; Sony Latin
- Website: nickinicole.com

Nicole Denise Cucco (born 25 August 2000), known professionally as Nicki Nicole (Spanish pronunciation: [ˈniki niˈkol]), is an Argentine rapper and singer-songwriter. Born and raised in Rosario, Santa Fe, she gained popularity with her singles "Wapo Traketero", "Colocao", "Mamichula", "Mala Vida", and "Marisola" (remix). At the 68th Annual Grammy Awards, she received her first Grammy nomination for Best Música Urbana Album for her 2024 album Naiki.

== Early life ==
Nicole was born in Rosario to a middle class family. She showed interest in music at a very early age. She attended Colegio Comunidad Educativa La Paz, where she completed her formal education.

== Career ==
In April 2019, Nicki Nicole released "Wapo Traketero" under Gonzalo Ferreyra's production. In August, the singer collaborated with Argentine producer Bizarrap on the thirteenth release of his "Music Sessions". The song peaked at number three on the Billboard Argentina Hot 100, skyrocketing both artists' popularity in the country. Later that month, Nicki Nicole released her second single titled "Años Luz".

On 8 November 2019, Nicki Nicole released her debut album Recuerdos, which counted with production from Bizarrap and collaborations with Cazzu and Duki. The album was followed by the release of a music video for her single "Diva".

In May 2020, the singer released her single "Colocao", which peaked at number six on the Argentina Hot 100 and 48th in Spain. In August, Nicki Nicole became the first Argentine woman to top the Argentina Hot 100 chart with "Mamichula", alongside Argentine rapper Trueno and Bizarrap. The song also peaked at number one in Spain and is certified platinum in the country as well.

Her appearance on The Tonight Show Starring Jimmy Fallon in April 2021 with Lunay received a lot of press coverage in Argentina, as she was the first Argentinean artist to perform on the show.

On 28 October 2021, she presented her latest album "Parte de Mí", where tracks from early in her career were joined by new songs. Featured in this album are several artists admired by her, such as Rauw Alejandro, Delaossa, Dread Mar I, and Trueno.

On 12 November 2021, Nicki Nicole collaborated with Los Ángeles Azules to release the instant cumbia hit "Otra Noche"

On 3 December 2021, Cucco collaborated with Aitana for a Latin pop song, Formentera.

On 5 January 2022, Nicole collaborated with Tiago PZK, Lit Killah, and María Becerra on the remix of "Entre Nosotros".

On 15 December 2022, Nicole collaborated with Cris MJ, Standly, and Duki for the remix of "Marisola".

In August 2025, Nicole and footballer Lamine Yamal confirmed that they were in a relationship through an Instagram post by Yamal, showing Yamal celebrating Nicole's 25th birthday with her. On 31 October 2025, the couple announced that they had separated, stating that their decision was mutual and not because of infidelity.

At the 68th Annual Grammy Awards, she received her first Grammy nomination for Best Música Urbana Album for her 2024 album Naiki.

== Discography ==
- Recuerdos (2019)
- Parte de Mí (2021)
- Alma (2023)
- Naiki (2024)

== Awards and nominations ==
Award	Year	Category	Nominated work	Result	Ref.
Heat Latin Music Awards	2021	Best New Artist	Herself	Nominated	
Heat Latin Music Awards	2021	Best Artist South Region	Herself	Nominated	
Heat Latin Music Awards	2021	Best Collaboration	"Ella No Es Tuya" (with Rochy RD and Myke Towers)	Won	
Heat Latin Music Awards	2022	Best Artist South Region	Herself	Nominated	
Heat Latin Music Awards	2022	Best Music Video	"Entre Nosotros" (remix) (with Tiago PZK, Lit Killah and María Becerra)	Won	
Heat Latin Music Awards	2023	Best Artist South Region	Herself	Nominated	
Heat Latin Music Awards	2024	Best Female Artist	Herself	Nominated	
Heat Latin Music Awards	2024	Best Artist South Region	Herself	Nominated	
iHeartRadio Music Awards	2022	Best New Latin Artist	Herself	Nominated	
Latin Grammy Awards	2020	Best New Artist	Herself	Nominated	
Latin Grammy Awards	2021	Best Rock Song	"Venganza" (with No Te Va Gustar)	Nominated	
Latin Grammy Awards	2022	Album of the Year	Aguilera (as songwriter)	Nominated	
Latin Grammy Awards	2022	Record of the Year	"Pa Mis Muchachas" (with Christina Aguilera, Nathy Peluso, and Becky G)	Nominated	
Latin Grammy Awards	2022	Song of the Year	"Pa Mis Muchachas" (with Christina Aguilera, Nathy Peluso, and Becky G)	Nominated	
Latin Grammy Awards	2022	Best Urban Fusion/Performance	"Pa Mis Muchachas" (with Christina Aguilera, Nathy Peluso, and Becky G)	Nominated	
Latin Grammy Awards	2023	Best Urban Music Album	Alma	Nominated	
Latin Grammy Awards	2023	Best Rap/Hip Hop Song	"Dispara***" (featuring Milo J)	Nominated	
Los 40 Music Awards	2020	Best New Latin Act	Herself	Nominated	
Los 40 Music Awards	2021	Best New Latin Act	Herself	Won	
Los 40 Music Awards	2022	Best Song	"Formentera" (with Aitana)	Nominated	
Los 40 Music Awards	2022	Best Collaboration	"Formentera" (with Aitana)	Won	
Martin Fierro Digital Awards	2019	Best Music Artist	Herself	Nominated	
MTV Europe Music Awards	2020	Best Latin America South Act	Herself	Nominated	
MTV Europe Music Awards	2021	Best Latin America South Act	Herself	Nominated	
MTV Europe Music Awards	2023	Best Latin America South Act	Herself	Nominated	
MTV Millennial Awards	2021	Argentine Artist	Herself	Nominated	
MTV Millennial Awards	2022	Argentine Artist	Herself	Nominated	
MTV Millennial Awards	2023	Flow Artist	Herself	Won	
MTV Millennial Awards	2023	Best Style	Herself	Nominated	
MTV Millennial Awards	2023	Reggaeton Hit	"Marisola" (remix) (with Cris MJ, Standly and Duki)	Nominated	
Premios Gardel	2020	Best New Artist	Recuerdos	Nominated	
Premios Gardel	2020	Best Trap/Urban Album or Song	Recuerdos	Nominated	
Premios Gardel	2020	Best Trap/Urban Collaboration	"Shorty" (with Duki)	Nominated	
Premios Gardel	2021	Song of the Year	"Colacao"	Nominated	
Premios Gardel	2021	Best Urban Music / Rap Song or Album	"Colacao"	Nominated	
Premios Gardel	2021	Best Urban Music / Rap Song or Album	"Mamichula" (with Trueno and Bizarrap)	Nominated	
Premios Gardel	2021	Best Urban Music / Trap Collaboration	"Mamichula" (with Trueno and Bizarrap)	Won	
Premios Gardel	2021	Best Urban Music / Trap Collaboration	"Verte" (with Dread Mar I and Bizarrap)	Nominated	
Premios Gardel	2022	Album of the Year	Parte de Mí	Nominated	
Premios Gardel	2022	Best Urban Music Album	Parte de Mí	Won	
Premios Gardel	2022	Best Urban Music Song	"Cambiando la piel" (with Wos)	Nominated	
Premios Gardel	2022	Best Urban Music Collaboration	"Cambiando la piel" (with Wos)	Won	
Premios Gardel	2023	Best Urban Music Song	"Frío"	Nominated	
Premios Gardel	2023	Best Urban Music Collaboration	"Entre Nosotros" (remix) (with Tiago PZK, Lit Killah and María Becerra)	Nominated	
Premios Gardel	2024	Best Urban Album	Alma	Won	
Premios Gardel	2024	Best Cover Design	Alma	Nominated	
Premios Gardel	2024	Producer of the Year	Alma	Nominated	
Premios Gardel	2024	Best Recording Engineering	Alma	Nominated	
Premios Gardel	2024	Song of the Year	"Dispara ***" (with Milo J)	Nominated	
Premios Gardel	2024	Record of the Year	"Dispara ***" (with Milo J)	Nominated	
Premios Gardel	2024	Best Urban Collaboration	"Dispara ***" (with Milo J)	Nominated	
Premios Gardel	2024	Best Urban Song	"8 AM" (with Young Miko)	Nominated	
Premios Juventud	2021	The New Generation - Female	Herself	Nominated	
Premios Juventud	2022	Artist of the Youth – Female	Herself	Nominated	
Premios Juventud	2022	Female Artist – On The Rise	Herself	Nominated	
Premios Juventud	2022	Best Girl Power Collab	"Pa Mis Muchachas" (with Christina Aguilera, Nicki Nicole & Becky G)	Nominated	
Premios Juventud	2022	Best Song by a Couple	"Dangerous" (with Trueno and Bizarrap)	Nominated	
Premios Juventud	2022	Best Regional Mexican Fusion	"Otra Noche" (with Los Ángeles Azules)	Nominated	
Premios Juventud	2023	Girl Power	"Intoxicao" (with Emilia)	Nominated	
Premios Lo Nuestro	2021	New Artist – Female	Herself	Won	
Premios Lo Nuestro	2021	Video of the Year	"Mala Vida"	Nominated	
Premios Lo Nuestro	2022	Female Urban Artist of the Year	Herself	Nominated	
Premios Lo Nuestro	2023	Female Urban Artist of the Year	Herself	Nominated	
Premios Lo Nuestro	2023	Remix of the Year	"Entre Nosotros" (remix) (with Tiago PZK, Lit Killah and María Becerra)	Nominated	
Premios Lo Nuestro	2023	Regional Mexican Song of the Year	"Otra Noche" (with Los Ángeles Azules)	Nominated	
Premios Quiero	2019	Best Trap Video	"Wapo Traketero"	Nominated	
Premios Quiero	2020	Best Female Video	"Diva"	Nominated	
Premios Quiero	2020	Best Rap/Trap/Hip Hop Video	"Colocao"	Nominated	
Premios Quiero	2020	Best Rap/Trap/Hip Hop Video	"Mamichula"	Won	
Premios Quiero	2020	Video of the Year	"Mamichula"	Nominated	
Premios Quiero	2021	Best Rock Video	"Venganza" (with No Te Va a Gustar)	Won	
Premios Quiero	2021	Best Female Video	"No Toque Mi Naik"	Nominated	
Premios Quiero	2022	Best Female Video	"Baby"	Nominated	
Premios Quiero	2022	Best Rap / Trap / Hip-Hop Video	"Entre Nosotros" (remix) (with Tiago PZK, Lit Killah and María Becerra)	Nominated	
Premios Quiero	2022	Best Rap / Trap / Hip-Hop Video	"Nobody Like Yo"	Nominated	
Premios Quiero	2022	Best Collaboration	"Otra Noche" (with Los Ángeles Azules)	Nominated	
Premios Tu Música Urbano	2022	Top Rising Star — Female	Herself	Nominated	
Premios Tu Música Urbano	2022	Album of the Year – Female Artist	Parte de Mi	Nominated	
Premios Tu Música Urbano	2022	Video of the Year – New Artist	"Entre Nosotros" (remix) (with Tiago PZK, Lit Killah and María Becerra)	Won	
Premios Tu Música Urbano	2023	Top Artist – Female	Herself	Nominated	
Premios Tu Música Urbano	2023	Remix of the Year	"Marisola" (remix) (with Cris MJ, Duki, Standly and Stars Music Chile)	Nominated	
Spotify Awards	2020	Radar Artist – Trap in Spanish	Herself	Won	
Spotify Awards	2020	Most Streamed Artist in Consoles	Herself	Won	
