= Alma (Nicki Nicole album) =

Studio album by Nicki Nicole
- Released: May 18, 2023
- Recorded: 2022
- Genres: Bolero; hip hop; tango; electronic; ballad
- Length: 24:43
- Language: Spanish
- Labels: Dale Play; Sony Latin
- Producers: Tatool; Caleb Calloway; Mauro; El Guincho; Brian Taylor

Nicki Nicole chronology
Parte de Mí (2021)	Alma (2023)	Naiki (2024)

Singles from Alma
- 1. "No Voy a Llorar :')" Released: March 9, 2023; 2. "¿Qué Le Pasa Conmigo?" Released: April 19, 2023; 3. "Dispara ***" Released: May 17, 2023; 4. "8 AM" Released: May 25, 2023

Alma (Spanish for "Soul") is the third studio album by Argentine singer Nicki Nicole. It was released on May 18, 2023, through Dale Play Records and Sony Music Latin labels. The album features collaborations with Milo J, Young Miko, YSY A and Rels B.

== Concept ==
The album was described as a conceptual and experimental work, in which Nicki Nicole reveals her most intimate side and addresses different musical genres. The artist, in reference to her work, defined it as an opportunity to "show darkness, fullness, happiness and all the points of what one feels and really feel".

The sounds of the album are inspired by bolero, tango, hip hop and electronic music. Alma is characterized by encompassing three abstract concepts: the soul, the heart and the mind. In reference to this, Nicole pointed out that it is called "assemblage point", since when these three concepts are in tune, everything works. Furthermore, the artist mentioned that her work was the product of a healing process related to emotional dependence.

In relation to the album title, Nicole mentioned that it emerged from a time in her life where she felt a lack of connection with herself, her brain and heart where she was shut down. Based on this, he stated that the album "is the representation of his most transparent self". Regarding the cover, he commented that the triangle formed by his hands reflects the meeting point of the three concepts that support the idea of the album.

== Reception ==
=== Critic's comments ===
Billboard magazine's Griselda Flores described Alma as "an album that draws on emotions, spirituality and reason". Next, she highlighted that "unlike Parte de Mí, released in 2021, this new set is sonically less experimental, but its lyrics are more raw, mature and intimate" and "Nicki takes fans on a journey of self-reflection". Additionally, she highlighted the opening track "Ya No", saying that it is "a moving yet dramatic piano-led ballad that highlights her striking voice".

In a positive review for the newspaper La Nación, Sebastián Chaves wrote that the album "finds a unity of meaning and a more evident cohesion than in the previous ones; and for the first time, the production seems to have focused on playing in favor of the Rosario singer's style".

=== Awards and nominations ===
Year	Award	Category	Result	Ref.
2023	Latin Grammy Awards	Best urban music album	Nominated	

== Release and promotion ==
On May 11, 2023, Nicki Nicole announced through her social networks that Alma would be released to the digital music market on May 18 of that same year. It was preceded by the publication of two singles and succeeded by one more.

=== Singles ===
On March 9, 2023, Nicki Nicole published the song "No Voy a Llorar :')" as the first preview of her album. The lyric portrays great spite and pain of a love that will not be possible. The track, according to fans and specialized media, is inspired by the artist's breakup with her ex-partner, the Argentine rapper and singer Trueno.

The second single titled "¿Qué Le Pasa Conmigo?" was released on April 19, 2023, in collaboration with Spanish singer Rels B. The song is characterized by the sounds of dembow and the lyrics talk about a strained relationship due to a third party in discord. It was presented for the first time live during a musical event at the Foro Sol in Mexico before more than sixty-five thousand people.

Nicole's next single was the song "Dispara ***" in collaboration with Milo J, which was published on May 17, 2023, one day before the official release of the album. The lyrics describe the challenges that the music industry presents and the determination one must have to get ahead. The track is a hip hop that is composed on a boom bap basis.

On May 25, 2023, a week after the album's release, the fourth single "8 AM" was released with Puerto Rican singer Young Miko.

== Track listing ==
Alma track listing
No.	Title	Writer(s)	Producer(s)	Length
1.	"Ya No"	Nicole Denise Cucco; Santiago Álvarado; Santiago Ruíz	Tatool	2:51
2.	"Dispara ***" (with Milo J)	Cucco; Camilo Joaquín Villarroel; Álvarado; Ruíz	Tatool	2:23
3.	"No Voy a Llorar :')"	Cucco; Pablo Díaz-Reixa; Álvarado; Ruíz	Tatool	2:58
4.	"8 AM" (with Young Miko)	Cucco; Diego López Crespo; Héctor Caleb López Jiménez; María Victoria Ramírez; Ruíz	Tatool; Caleb Calloway; Mauro	2:27
5.	"Se Va 1 Llegan 2"	Cucco; Díaz-Reixa	El Guincho	2:23
6.	"Llámame"	Cucco; Álvarado	Tatool	2:04
7.	"¿Qué Le Pasa Conmigo?" (with Rels B)	Cucco; Brian Taylor; Álvarado; Ruíz	Tatool	2:47
8.	"Tuyo (Cover)"	Cucco; Rodrigo Amarante; Álvarado; Ruíz	Tatool	2:13
9.	"Caen las Estrellas" (with YSY A)	Cucco; Alejo Nahuel Acosta Migliarini; Taylor; Díaz-Reixa; Álvarado; Ruíz	Taylor; Tatool	2:25
10.	"Tienes Mi Alma"	Cucco; Álvarado; Ruíz	Tatool	2:07
Total length:				24:43

== Charts ==
Chart (2023)	Peak position
Spain (PROMUSICAE)	19

== Certifications ==
Region	Certification	Certified units/sales
Mexico (AMPROFON)	Gold	70,000^{‡}
^{‡} Sales+streaming figures based on certification alone.

== Release history ==
Region	Date	Format(s)	Label	Ref.
Various	May 18, 2023	Music download; streaming	Dale Play; Sony Latin	
