= Milo J =

Argentine singer (born 2006)

- Milo J at the 2026 Latin Grammy Awards

Background information
- Born: Camilo Joaquín Villarruel; 25 October 2006 (age 20); Morón, Buenos Aires, Argentina
- Genres: Latin R&B; Latin trap; easy listening
- Occupations: Rapper; singer; Producer; songwriter
- Years active: 2021-present
- Labels: Dale Play; Sony Latin
- Website: www.milojota.com (in Spanish)

Camilo Joaquín Villarruel (born 25 October 2006), known by his stage name Milo J (stylized Milo j) is an Argentine rapper, singer, producer and songwriter. He achieved international recognition in 2023 with the song "Milo J: Bzrp Music Sessions, Vol. 57" as well as the collaborative EP En Dormir Sin Madrid, both with Argentine producer Bizarrap.

His debut studio album 111 was released in 2023. Also in 2023, he received a nomination for the Latin Grammy Award for Best Rap/Hip Hop Song for "Dispara ***" alongside fellow Argentine singer Nicki Nicole. He received a total of 6 nominations for the Latin Grammy Awards.

== Early life ==
Camilo Joaquín Villarruel was born on 25 October 2006, in Morón, Buenos Aires, Argentina, to parents Walter Villarruel and Aldana Celeste Ríos. He showed interest in music from an early age, writing songs with his sister at 11 and participating in freestyle competitions.

== Career ==
Milo J began his music career in late 2021 as a part of BajoWest, a community for independent urban artists in Buenos Aires, where he started uploading his first songs to YouTube such as "Tus Vueltas", "Cuando Estas Vos" and "Tu Paz". He began to receive significant public attention in 2022 with the release of "Milagrosa"; the song became part of a viral TikTok trend in Argentina.

In early 2023, he released the song "Rara Vez" with producer Taiu. The song was a commercial success topping the charts in several countries on Spotify and further increasing his popularity in his home country. He released 511, his debut EP with five tracks, on 14 April 2023. 3 months later, he was one of the performers for the third edition of La Velada del Año, an amateur boxing event between Ibero-American Twitch streamers. Throughout the year, he continued collaborating with various artists such as "Dispara ***" with Nicki Nicole, the remix of "Aeróbico" with Duki and Lit Killah, and most prominently, "Milo J: Bzrp Music Sessions, Vol. 57" with Bizarrap, charting in multiple countries, peaking at number 2 in Spain and 31 at the Billboard Global 200 chart. The single with Bizarrap was released alongside a five-track collaborative EP titled En Dormir Sin Madrid.

At the 24th Annual Latin Grammy Awards, he earned his first Latin Grammy Award nomination for Best Rap/Hip Hop Song for "Dispara ***". Later in 2023, he released his debut studio album 111 through Dale Play Records, featuring collaborations with Yami Safdie, Yahritza y Su Esencia, Peso Pluma and Nicki Nicole.

In 2025, he signed with Sony Music Latin.

=== 2025–present: La vida era más corta ===
In September 2025, Milo J released his third studio album, La vida era más corta. The album produced three singles that gained traction on digital and streaming platforms: "Niño", "Bajo de la piel", and "Solifican12". It also incorporated various samples and references to Argentine and Latin American folk and popular compositions, including "Puente Pexoa" by Tránsito Cocomarola, "Giros" by Fito Páez, and "Zamba de Amor en Vuelo" by Tamara Castro. The album also included reinterpretations of traditional songs such as "Zamba para un bohemio guitarrero" and "Canción del jangadero", as well as excerpts from Indigenous chants and previously unreleased recordings by Mercedes Sosa. The album received favorable reviews from music critics, who highlighted its combination of contemporary urban sounds with folk and regional elements. Critics from Billboard praised the production, stating that it "presents a musical journey that embraces Argentine culture and brings it into the present". That same year, Milo J entered into a collaboration agreement with the video game Garena Free Fire. As part of the collaboration, his song "Ashe Ashe" premiered in one of the brand's commercials.

Shortly after the release of the official music video, Milo J performed at the 66th Cosquín Folk Festival. On 1 February, he closed the ninth and final night of the festival with the project "¡FALklore!", which combined urban sounds with contemporary Argentine folk. In February 2026, he presented material from La vida era más corta at the Viña del Mar International Song Festival, receiving positive reviews and two Gaviota Awards, one silver and one gold. Several months earlier, in December 2025, he had embarked on the La vida era más corta Tour, a world tour that continued until July 2026. The tour achieved several attendance milestones, including a concert in Lima attended by more than 40,000 people, making it the largest concert of his career. In April, he performed a Tiny Desk Concert for the American public broadcaster NPR alongside Uruguayan murga group Agarrate Catalina. Reviewing the album, Argentine editor Humphrey Inzillo of Rolling Stone described it as “a career-defining work that displays remarkable solidity”, while critic Jorge Oyarce Kruger characterized its tracks as "a space of cultural resistance".

== Discography ==
=== Album ===
Title	Details	Peak chart positions
Title	Details	SPA
111	Release: November 30, 2023; Record label: Dale Play Records; Formats: Digital download, streaming	23

=== Extended plays ===
List of EPs, with selected details
Title	Extended play details	Peaks	
Title	Extended play details	SPA	US Latin
511	Release: April 13, 2023; Record label: Dale Play Records; Formats: Digital download, streaming	–	–
En Dormir sin Madrid (with Bizarrap)	Released: October 4, 2023; Label: Dale Play; Format: Digital download, streaming	3	46

=== Singles ===
List of singles, with selected peak chart positions and certifications
Title	Year	Peak chart positions								Certifications	Album
Title	Year	ARG	CHL	COL	ECU	PER	SPA	URU	WW	Certifications	Album
"Tus Vueltas"	2021	–	–	–	–	–	–	–	–		Non-album singles
"Milagrosa"	2022	36	–	–	–	–	–	–	–	AMPROFON: Gold	Non-album singles
"El Bolero" (with Yami Safdie)	2022	–	–	–	–	–	–	–	–		Dije que no me iba a enamorar
"Valores del West" (with Foco Foking)	2022	–	–	–	–	–	–	–	–		Non-album singles
"Rara Vez" (with Taiu)	2023	17	–	–	–	–	9	–	–	PROMUSICAE: 4× Platinum	Non-album singles
"Aeróbico (Remix)" (with Bhavi, Duki & Lit Killah)	2023	–	–	–	–	–	–	–	–		Non-album singles
"Rincón"	2023	–	–	–	–	–	81	–	–		Non-album singles
"Flechazo en el Centro" (with Ysy A & Bhavi)	2023	19	–	–	–	–	–	–	–		Non-album singles
"Milo J: Bzrp Music Sessions, Vol. 57" (with Bizarrap)	2023	1	5	9	3	2	3	3	31	AMPROFON: Platinum; PROMUSICAE: Platinum	En Dormir Sin Madrid
"Fruto" (with Bizarrap)	2023	10	11	–	13	7	22	6	106	PROMUSICAE: Gold	En Dormir Sin Madrid
"Dispara ***" (with Nicki Nicole)	2023	11	–	–	–	–	67	–	–	AMPROFON: Gold; PROMUSICAE: Gold; RIAA: Gold (Latin)	Alma
"Carencias de Cordura" (with Yami Safdie)	2023	92	–	–	–	–	–	–	–		111
"Alumbre" (with Nicki Nicole)	2023	55	–	–	–	–	–	–	–		111
"Una Bala" (with Peso Pluma)	2023	29	–	–	–	–	–	–	– (Note: "Una Bala" did not enter the Billboard Global 200, but peaked at number 171 on the Billboard Global Excl. US chart.)	AMPROFON: Gold	111
"Te Fui a Seguir" (with Yahritza y Su Esencia)	2023	82	–	–	–	–	–	–	–		111
"Dom1ngo"	2024	–	–	–	–	–	–	–	–		111
"La Canción Feliz del Disco" (with Eladio Carrión)	2024	–	–	–	–	–	36	–	–		Sol María
"Vitalicio"	2024	–	–	–	–	–	–	–	–		111
"Mi Último Peso" (with Foco Foking)	2024	–	–	–	–	–	–	–	–		Non-album singles
"Carta de Despedida" (with Lit Killah and Ronny J)	2024	22	–	–	–	–	–	–	–		Non-album singles
"Bésame (Remix)" (with Bhavi, Seven Kayne, Tiago PZK, Khea & Neo Pistea)	2024	1	–	–	–	–	54	–	–		Non-album singles
"—" denotes a recording that did not chart or was not released in that territory.

=== Other charted and certified songs ===
List of other charted songs
Title	Year	Peak chart positions				Certifications	Album
Title	Year	ARG	PER	SPA	URU	Certifications	Album
"Morocha"	2022	84	–	–	–		—N/a
"Morning"	2023	66	–	–	–		—N/a
"FLA"	2023	79	–	–	–		511
"Al Borde"	2023	39	–	–	–	AMPROFON: Gold	511
"M.A.I."	2023	17	–	6	–	AMPROFON: Gold; PROMUSICAE: Platinum	111
"Toy en el Mic" (with Bizarrap)	2023	15	24	40	14	AMPROFON: Gold	En Dormir sin Madrid
"No Soy Eterno" (with Bizarrap)	2023	21	22	46	—	AMPROFON: Gold	En Dormir sin Madrid
"Penas de Antaño" (with Bizarrap)	2023	31	—	63	—		En Dormir sin Madrid
"—" denotes a recording that did not chart or was not released in that territory.	2023						

== Awards and nominations ==
Award	Year	Category	Nominated work	Result	Ref.
Berlin Music Video Awards	2026	Best Narrative	"Niño"	Nominated	
Grammy Awards	2027	Best Latin Rock Or Alternative Album	La Vida Era Más Corta	Pending	
Grammy Awards	2027	Best Latin Song	"Niño"	Pending	
Heat Latin Music Awards	2024	Best Artist South Region	Milo J	Nominated	
Heat Latin Music Awards	2026	Best Artist South Region	Milo J	Pending	
Heat Latin Music Awards	2026	Song of the Year	"Niño"	Pending	
Heat Latin Music Awards	2026	Best Music Video	"Bajo De La Piel"	Pending	
Latin Grammy Awards	2023	Best Rap/Hip Hop Song	"Dispara ***" (with Nicki Nicole)	Nominated	
Latin Grammy Awards	2026	Record of the Year	"Niño"	Won	
Latin Grammy Awards	2026	Album of the Year	La Vida Era Más Corta	Nominated	
Latin Grammy Awards	2026	Best Folk Album	La Vida Era Más Corta	Won	
Latin Grammy Awards	2026	Best Recording Package	La Vida Era Más Corta	Won	
Latin Grammy Awards	2026	Song of the Year	"Solifican12"	Nominated	
Latin Grammy Awards	2026	Best Urban Performance	"Gil" (with Trueno)	Won	
Los 40 Music Awards	2023	Best Latin New Act	Milo J	Nominated	
MTV Millennial Awards	2024	Crack Artist	Milo J	Nominated	
Premios Cóndor de Plata	2025	Male Breakout Star	Homo Argentum	Nominated	
Premios Gardel	2024	Album of the Year	111	Nominated	
Premios Gardel	2024	Best Cover Design	111	Nominated	
Premios Gardel	2024	Best Concept Album	111	Nominated	
Premios Gardel	2024	Song of the Year	"Dispara ***" (with Nicki Nicole)	Nominated	
Premios Gardel	2024	Record of the Year	"Dispara ***" (with Nicki Nicole)	Nominated	
Premios Gardel	2024	Record of the Year	"M.A.I."	Nominated	
Premios Gardel	2024	Best New Artist	Milo J	Won	
Premios Gardel	2024	Best Urban Album	En Dormir Sin Madrid (with Bizarrap)	Nominated	
Premios Gardel	2024	Best Music Film	En Dormir Sin Madrid (with Bizarrap)	Nominated	
Premios Gardel	2024	Best Urban Song	"Fruto" (with Bizarrap)	Won	
Premios Gardel	2024	Best Urban Song	"Rara Vez" (with Taiu)	Nominated	
Premios Gardel	2024	Best Urban Collaboration	"Milo J: Bzrp Music Sessions, Vol. 57" (with Bizarrap)	Nominated	
Premios Gardel	2024	Best Urban Collaboration	"Dispara ***" (with Nicki Nicole)	Nominated	
Premios Gardel	2025	Album of the Year	166	Nominated	
Premios Gardel	2025	Best Urban Album	166	Nominated	
Premios Gardel	2025	Best Urban Album	En Dormir sin Madrid (Deluxe)	Nominated	
Premios Gardel	2025	Song of the Year	"3 Pecados Después..."	Nominated	
Premios Gardel	2025	Best Urban Song	"3 Pecados Después..."	Nominated	
Premios Gardel	2025	Best Urban Pop Song	"A Vos"	Nominated	
Premios Gardel	2025	Best Rock Song	"Pasos al Costado" (with Turf)	Nominated	
Premios Gardel	2025	Best Live Album	18 (En Vivo Estadio de Morón)	Nominated	
Premios Gardel	2025	Best Long Form Music Video	"Intro" + "3 Pecados" + "Ni Carlos Ni José"	Nominated	
Premios Gardel	2026	Producer of the Year	Milo J	Nominated	
Premios Gardel	2026	Album of the Year	La Vida Era Más Corta	Won	
Premios Gardel	2026	Best Long-Form Music Video	La Vida Era Más Corta	Nominated	
Premios Gardel	2026	Best Concept Album	La Vida Era Más Corta	Won	
Premios Gardel	2026	Best Engineered Album	La Vida Era Más Corta	Won	
Premios Gardel	2026	Song of the Year	"Niño"	Won	
Premios Gardel	2026	Record of the Year	"Niño"	Won	
Premios Gardel	2026	Best Folklore Song	"Niño"	Won	
Premios Gardel	2026	Best Urban Album	166 (Deluxe) Retirada	Won	
Premios Gardel	2026	Best Urban Song	"Olimpo"	Won	
Premios Gardel	2026	Best Urban Collaboration	"Gil" (with Trueno)	Won	
Premios Gardel	2026	Best Hip-Hop/Rap Song	"Gil" (with Trueno)	Won	
Premios Gardel	2026	Best Hip-Hop/Rap Song	"Retirada"	Nominated	
Premios Gardel	2026	Best Singer-Songwriter Song	"Luciérnagas" (with Silvio Rodríguez)	Won	
Premios Gardel	2026	Best Short-Form Music Video	"Bajo de la Piel"	Won	
Premios Gardel	2026	Best Collaboration	"Jangadero" (with Mercedes Sosa)	Nominated	
Premios Gardel	2026	Best Live Song	"La Taleñita"	Nominated	
Premios Juventud	2024	The New Generation – Male	Milo J	Nominated	
Premios Lo Nuestro	2024	New Artist – Male	Milo J	Nominated	

- Note: At the 26th Annual Premios Gardel, Facundo Yalve won Producer of the Year for his work in 111, while Yalve with Santiago Ruiz and Javier Fracchia were nominated as engineers for Best Recording Engineering, also for 111.
