= Dread Mar I =

Argentine singer (born 1978)

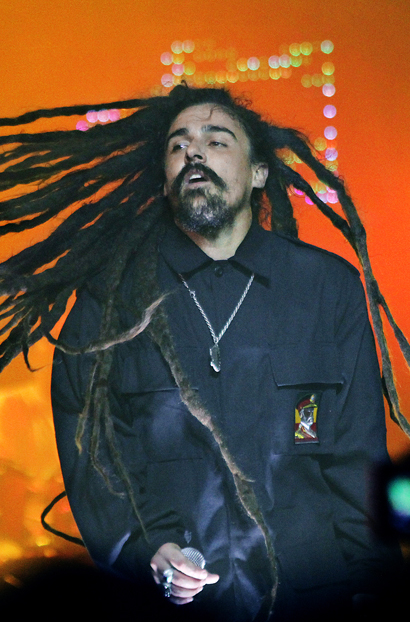
- Dread Mar I in 2011

Background information
- Born: Mariano Javier Castro; January 31, 1978 (age 48); Quequén, Buenos Aires, Argentina
- Genres: Reggae; Ragga
- Occupation: Singer
- Years active: 2002–present
- Labels: TAMS Records; Sony Music Latin

Mariano Javier Castro (born 31 January 1978), known professionally as Dread Mar I, is an Argentine singer of reggae rock, reggae en Español, ska and pop music.

== Early life ==
Born in Quequén, Argentina, Castro dropped out of school in the seventh grade and moved to Maipú, Buenos Aires to work in his father's bakery. After a decade in the town, he travelled to Buenos Aires where he eventually began making music. In 2004 he recorded the song "Mi amor" with a musician called DreadGon, and performed with a group called Messengers Reggae on their album Luz in 2005.

== Career ==
In 2005, Castro began performing as a solo artist under the name "Dread Mar I", and released his first album Jah Guia. He also performed as the backup singer for a group called Los Cafres. In 2006, he performed with the Argentine artist Guillermo Bonetto and released the album Hermanos while performing domestically. In 2008, he started performing internationally in Chile and Uruguay and was the Argentine reggae artist with the most shows that calendar year with 60 shows in less than 8 months. That year he also released his album Amor-es.

In 2010, he released his album Viví en do. In June 2012, he released the album Transparente. In 2015, he performed at the Galileo Galilei Planetarium celebrating a decade of performing. The performance was recorded under an album called 10 años (en vivo) , and released at Estadio Luna Park. In 2018, he recorded Caminarás caminos in Jamaica with renowned reggae artists.

In the year 2020, his single "Tú sin mí" and record for the most viewed Argentine song on YouTube with 550 million views. In October 2020, he had the three most popular songs on YouTube. In 2021, he released his album Yo.

== Discography ==
- Luz (with Reggae Messengers) (2005)
- Jah Guia (2005)
- Hermanos (2006)
- Amor-es (2008)
- Vive en do (2010)
- Transparente (2012)
- En el sendero (2014)
- 10 años (en vivo) (2016)
- Caminarás caminos (2018)
- Yo (2021)
- A tempo (2025)
