= List of Billboard Argentina Hot 100 number-one singles of 2023 =

The Billboard Argentina Hot 100 is a chart that ranks the best-performing songs in the Argentina. Its data, published by Billboard Argentina and Billboard magazines and compiled by Nielsen SoundScan and BMAT/Vericast, is based collectively on each song's weekly physical and digital sales, as well as the amount of airplay received on Argentine radio stations and TV and streaming on online digital music outlets.

== Chart history ==
No.	Issue date	Song	Artist(s)	Ref.
42	January 1	"Muchachos, Ahora Nos Volvimos a Ilusionar"	La Mosca Tsé - Tsé	
re	January 8	"La Bachata"	Manuel Turizo	
43	January 15	"Marisola" (remix)	Cris MJ, Duki and Nicki Nicole featuring Standly	
43	January 22	"Marisola" (remix)	Cris MJ, Duki and Nicki Nicole featuring Standly	
44	January 29	"Shakira: Bzrp Music Sessions, Vol. 53"	Bizarrap and Shakira	
44	February 5	"Shakira: Bzrp Music Sessions, Vol. 53"	Bizarrap and Shakira	
44	February 12	"Shakira: Bzrp Music Sessions, Vol. 53"	Bizarrap and Shakira	
44	February 19	"Shakira: Bzrp Music Sessions, Vol. 53"	Bizarrap and Shakira	
45	February 26	"Ya No Vuelvas"	Luck Ra, La K'onga and Ke Personajes	
46	March 5	"En La Intimidad"	Big One, Emilia and Callejero Fino	
46	March 12	"En La Intimidad"	Big One, Emilia and Callejero Fino	
46	March 19	"En La Intimidad"	Big One, Emilia and Callejero Fino	
46	March 26	"En La Intimidad"	Big One, Emilia and Callejero Fino	
46	April 2	"En La Intimidad"	Big One, Emilia and Callejero Fino	
46	April 9	"En La Intimidad"	Big One, Emilia and Callejero Fino	
46	April 16	"En La Intimidad"	Big One, Emilia and Callejero Fino	
47	April 23	"M.A" (remix)	BM, Callejero Fino and La Joaqui featuring Lola Índigo	
48	April 30	"Un Finde"	Big One, FMK and Ke Personajes	
48	May 7	"Un Finde"	Big One, FMK and Ke Personajes	
48	May 14	"Un Finde"	Big One, FMK and Ke Personajes	
48	May 21	"Un Finde"	Big One, FMK and Ke Personajes	
re	May 28	"M.A" (remix)	BM, Callejero Fino and La Joaqui featuring Lola Índigo	
re	June 4	"Un Finde"	Big One, FMK and Ke Personajes	
re	June 11	"M.A" (remix)	BM, Callejero Fino and La Joaqui featuring Lola Índigo	
49	June 18	"Los del Espacio"	Lit Killah, María Becerra, FMK, Rusherking, Duki, Emilia, Tiago PZK and Big One	
49	June 25	"Los del Espacio"	Lit Killah, María Becerra, FMK, Rusherking, Duki, Emilia, Tiago PZK and Big One	
49	July 2	"Los del Espacio"	Lit Killah, María Becerra, FMK, Rusherking, Duki, Emilia, Tiago PZK and Big One	
49	July 9	"Los del Espacio"	Lit Killah, María Becerra, FMK, Rusherking, Duki, Emilia, Tiago PZK and Big One	
49	July 16	"Los del Espacio"	Lit Killah, María Becerra, FMK, Rusherking, Duki, Emilia, Tiago PZK and Big One	
49	July 23	"Los del Espacio"	Lit Killah, María Becerra, FMK, Rusherking, Duki, Emilia, Tiago PZK and Big One	
50	July 30	"Corazón Vacío"	María Becerra	
re	August 6	"Los del Espacio"	Lit Killah, María Becerra, FMK, Rusherking, Duki, Emilia, Tiago PZK and Big One	
51	August 13	"Lala"	Myke Towers	
51	August 20	"Lala"	Myke Towers	
51	August 27	"Lala"	Myke Towers	
51	September 3	"Lala"	Myke Towers	
51	September 10	"Lala"	Myke Towers	
51	September 17	"Lala"	Myke Towers	
52	September 24	"La Morocha"	Luck Ra and BM	
52	October 1	"La Morocha"	Luck Ra and BM	
52	October 8	"La Morocha"	Luck Ra and BM	
52	October 15	"La Morocha"	Luck Ra and BM	
53	October 22	"Milo J: Bzrp Music Sessions, Vol. 57"	Bizarrap and Milo J	
re	October 29	"La Morocha"	Luck Ra and BM	
re	November 5	"La Morocha"	Luck Ra and BM	
re	November 12	"La Morocha"	Luck Ra and BM	
54	November 19	"La Original"	Emilia and Tini	
54	November 26	"La Original"	Emilia and Tini	
54	December 3	"La Original"	Emilia and Tini	
54	December 10	"La Original"	Emilia and Tini	
54	December 17	"La Original"	Emilia and Tini	
54	December 24	"La Original"	Emilia and Tini	
54	December 31	"La Original"	Emilia and Tini	

== See also ==
- List of Billboard Argentina Hot 100 top-ten singles in 2023
