= List of Billboard Argentina Hot 100 top-ten singles in 2023 =

This is a list of singles that charted in the top ten of the Billboard Argentina Hot 100 chart in 2023.

== Top-ten singles ==
Key

- ◁ – indicates single's top 10 entry was also its Hot 100 debut

List of Billboard Hot 100 top ten singles that peaked in 2023
Top ten entry date	Single	Artist(s)	Peak	Peak date	Weeks in top ten	Ref.
Singles from 2022
December 25	"Muchachos, Ahora Nos Volvimos a Ilusionar"	La Mosca Tsé - Tsé	1	January 1	2	
December 25	"Turreo Sessions #723"	DJ Tao and Callejero Fino	7	January 1	4	
Singles from 2023
January 1	"Marisola (Remix)"	Cris MJ, Duki and Nicki Nicole featuring Standly	1	January 15	10	
January 1	"Ya No Vuelvas"	Luck Ra, La K'onga and Ke Personajes	1	February 26	19	
January 15	"Pa' La Selección"	La T y La M	5	January 15	6	
January 22	"Shakira: Bzrp Music Sessions, Vol. 53" ◁	Bizarrap and Shakira	1	January 29	13	
January 22	"Punto G"	Quevedo	7	January 29	4	
January 29	"Muñecas" ◁	Tini, La Joaqui and Steve Aoki	3	February 12	11	
February 5	"Flowers"	Miley Cyrus	3	February 5	7	
February 12	"M.A. (Mejores Amigos)"	BM, Callejero Fino and La Joaqui featuring Lola Índigo (Note: Callejero Fino, La Joaqui and Lola Índigo started being credited as co-lead artists from the week ending April 23, 2023.)	1	April 23	28	
February 19	"En La Intimidad" ◁	Big One, Emilia and Callejero Fino	1	March 5	17	
February 19	"Mercho"	Lil Cake and Migrantes featuring Nico Valdi	4	April 9	11	
February 26	"Yandel 150" (Note: The single re-entered the top ten on the week ending March 12, 2023.)	Yandel and Feid	6	April 9	8	
March 5	"Cupido"	Tini	3	March 12	13	
March 12	"TQG" ◁	Karol G and Shakira	2	March 12	8	
March 26	"Te Escapas de Mis Brazos"	Ecko, Callejero Fino and El Perro	10	March 26	2	
April 9	"Arcángel: Bzrp Music Sessions, Vol. 54"	Bizarrap and Arcángel	9	April 9	1	
April 16	"Rara Vez" (Note: The single re-entered the top ten on the week ending April 30, 2023.)	Milo J and Taiu	8	April 16	2	
April 16	"Pobre Corazón" (Note: The single re-entered the top ten on the week ending May 7, 2023.) (Note: The single re-entered the top ten on the week ending June 25, 2023.) (Note: The single re-entered the top ten on the week ending July 30, 2023.)	Ke Personajes and Onda Sabalera	3	May 7	12	
April 23	"Un Finde"	Big One, FMK and Ke Personajes	1	April 30	23	
April 23	"Adiós"	María Becerra	5	June 11	19	
April 30	"Jagger"	Emilia	5	May 7	2	
May 7	"Perfecta"	Miranda!, María Becerra and FMK	6	May 14	4	
May 7	"Classy 101"	Feid and Young Miko	9	May 21	6	
May 14	"La Bebe"	Yng Lvcas and Peso Pluma	3	May 28	12	
May 14	"Un x100to"	Grupo Frontera and Bad Bunny	6	May 28	11	
June 4	"No Se Ve"	Emilia and Ludmilla	5	July 30	15	
June 4	"Me Enteré" ◁	Tiago PZK and Tini	6	June 18	10	
June 18	"Los del Espacio" (Note: The single re-entered the top ten on the week ending December 17, 2023.) ◁	Lit Killah, María Becerra, FMK, Rusherking, Duki, Emilia, Tiago PZK and Big One	1	June 18	23	
June 18	"Bzrp Music Sessions, Vol. 55"	Bizarrap and Peso Pluma	3	June 18	3	
June 18	"Ella Baila Sola"	Eslabón Armado and Peso Pluma	10	June 18	1	
July 09	"Corazón Vacío" ◁	María Becerra	1	July 30	15	
July 16	"Bzrp Music Sessions, Vol. 56"	Bizarrap and Rauw Alejandro	10	July 16	1	
July 23	"Lala"	Myke Towers	2	August 13	17	
August 6	"Columbia"	Quevedo	4	August 13	12	
August 6	"Ni Una Ni Dos"	BM	3	September 24	13	
August 13	"Mentiras" (Note: The single re-entered the top ten on the week ending January 7, 2024.)	Big One, Rusherking and Ulises Bueno	5	October 15	21	
August 27	"Ojitos Rojos" (Note: The single re-entered the top ten on the week ending December 31, 2023.)	Grupo Frontera and Ke Personajes	4	October 15	17	
September 3	"La Morocha"	Luck Ra and BM	1	September 24	28	
September 17	"El Amor de Mi Vida"	Los Ángeles Azules and María Becerra	2	October 8	18	
October 1	"GTA" (Note: The single re-entered the top ten on the week ending December 17, 2023.)	Emilia	2	October 15	13	
October 22	"Bzrp Music Sessions, Vol.57"	Bizarrap and Milo J	1	October 22	3	
October 29	"Lágrimas"	Big One, Tini and BM	6	November 5	5	
October 29	"Fruto"	Bizarrap and Milo J	10	October 29	2	
November 5	"Linda (Remix)"	Marka Akme, DJ Tao, Lauty Gram, Migrantes and Peipper	3	November 5	12	
November 5	"Lollipop"	Darell	2	November 12	7	
November 19	"La Original" ◁	Emilia and Tini	1	November 19	20	
November 19	"Si No Estás"	Iñigo Quintero	7	November 26	4	
December 3	"Piscina"	María Becerra, Chencho Corleone and Ovy on the Drums	5	December 3	7	
December 10	"Que Me Falte Todo"	Luck Ra and Abel Pintos	3	December 31	19	
December 10	"Exclusive"	Emilia	3	December 31	8	
December 31	"Besos con Fernet" (Note: The single re-entered the top ten on the week ending January 14, 2024.)	Rusherking and Márama	8	December 31	2	

=== 2022 peaks ===
List of Billboard Hot 100 top ten singles in 2023 that peaked in 2022
Top ten entry date	Single	Artist(s)	Peak	Peak date	Weeks in top ten	Ref.
April 24	"Arrancármelo" (Note: The single re-entered the top ten on the week ending January 8, 2023.)	Wos	6	April 24	4	
July 24	"Quevedo: Bzrp Music Sessions, Vol. 52"	Bizarrap and Quevedo	1	July 24	29	
July 24	"Tu Turrito"	Rei and Callejero Fino	3	August 21	26	
August 21	"Despechá"	Rosalía	2	August 28	26	
August 21	"La Bachata"	Manuel Turizo	1	September 18	29	
November 6	"Besos Moja2"	Wisin & Yandel and Rosalía	6	November 27	12	
November 20	"Dos Besitos"	La Joaqui, Salastkbron and Gusty DJ	4	December 18	11	

== See also ==
- List of Billboard Argentina Hot 100 number-one singles of 2023

== Notes ==
Notes for re-entries
