= List of Billboard Argentina Hot 100 number-one singles of 2024 =

The Billboard Argentina Hot 100 is a chart that ranks the best-performing songs in the Argentina. Its data, published by Billboard Argentina and Billboard magazines and compiled by Nielsen SoundScan and BMAT/Vericast, is based collectively on each song's weekly physical and digital sales, as well as the amount of airplay received on Argentine radio stations and TV and streaming on online digital music outlets.

== Chart history ==
No.	Issue date	Song	Artist(s)	Ref.
re	January 7	"La Morocha"	Luck Ra and BM	
re	January 14	"La Morocha"	Luck Ra and BM	
55	January 21	"Una Foto (Remix)"	Mesita, Nicki Nicole and Tiago PZK featuring Emilia	
55	January 28	"Una Foto (Remix)"	Mesita, Nicki Nicole and Tiago PZK featuring Emilia	
55	February 4	"Una Foto (Remix)"	Mesita, Nicki Nicole and Tiago PZK featuring Emilia	
55	February 11	"Una Foto (Remix)"	Mesita, Nicki Nicole and Tiago PZK featuring Emilia	
55	February 18	"Una Foto (Remix)"	Mesita, Nicki Nicole and Tiago PZK featuring Emilia	
55	February 25	"Una Foto (Remix)"	Mesita, Nicki Nicole and Tiago PZK featuring Emilia	
56	March 3	"Hola Perdida"	Luck Ra and Khea	
56	March 10	"Hola Perdida"	Luck Ra and Khea	
56	March 17	"Hola Perdida"	Luck Ra and Khea	
56	March 24	"Hola Perdida"	Luck Ra and Khea	
re	March 31	"Una Foto (Remix)"	Mesita, Nicki Nicole and Tiago PZK featuring Emilia	
re	April 7	"Una Foto (Remix)"	Mesita, Nicki Nicole and Tiago PZK featuring Emilia	
re	April 14	"Una Foto (Remix)"	Mesita, Nicki Nicole and Tiago PZK featuring Emilia	
re	April 21	"Una Foto (Remix)"	Mesita, Nicki Nicole and Tiago PZK featuring Emilia	
57	April 28	"Pa"	Tini	
58	May 5	"Bésame (Remix)"	Bhavi, Seven Kayne and Milo J featuring Tiago PZK, Khea and Neo Pistea	
58	May 12	"Bésame (Remix)"	Bhavi, Seven Kayne and Milo J featuring Tiago PZK, Khea and Neo Pistea	
58	May 19	"Bésame (Remix)"	Bhavi, Seven Kayne and Milo J featuring Tiago PZK, Khea and Neo Pistea	
58	May 26	"Bésame (Remix)"	Bhavi, Seven Kayne and Milo J featuring Tiago PZK, Khea and Neo Pistea	
58	June 2	"Bésame (Remix)"	Bhavi, Seven Kayne and Milo J featuring Tiago PZK, Khea and Neo Pistea	
59	June 9	"Ojos Verdes"	Nicki Nicole	
60	June 16	"Perdonarte, ¿Para Qué?"	Los Ángeles Azules and Emilia	
60	June 23	"Perdonarte, ¿Para Qué?"	Los Ángeles Azules and Emilia	
60	June 30	"Perdonarte, ¿Para Qué?"	Los Ángeles Azules and Emilia	
60	July 7	"Hoy"	Valentino Merlo and The La Planta	
60	July 14	"Hoy"	Valentino Merlo and The La Planta	
60	July 21	"Hoy"	Valentino Merlo and The La Planta	
60	July 28	"Hoy"	Valentino Merlo and The La Planta	
60	August 4	"Hoy"	Valentino Merlo and The La Planta	
60	August 11	"Hoy"	Valentino Merlo and The La Planta	
60	August 18	"Hoy"	Valentino Merlo and The La Planta	
60	August 25	"Hoy"	Valentino Merlo and The La Planta	
60	September 1	"Hoy"	Valentino Merlo and The La Planta	
60	September 8	"Hoy"	Valentino Merlo and The La Planta	
60	September 15	"Hoy"	Valentino Merlo and The La Planta	
61	September 22	"Si Antes Te Hubiera Conocido"	Karol G	
61	September 29	"Si Antes Te Hubiera Conocido"	Karol G	
61	October 5	"Si Antes Te Hubiera Conocido"	Karol G	
61	October 12	"Si Antes Te Hubiera Conocido"	Karol G	
61	October 19	"Si Antes Te Hubiera Conocido"	Karol G	
61	October 26	"Si Antes Te Hubiera Conocido"	Karol G	
61	November 3	"Si Antes Te Hubiera Conocido"	Karol G	
61	November 10	"Si Antes Te Hubiera Conocido"	Karol G	
61	November 17	"Si Antes Te Hubiera Conocido"	Karol G	
61	November 24	"Si Antes Te Hubiera Conocido"	Karol G	
61	December 1	"Si Antes Te Hubiera Conocido"	Karol G	
61	December 8	"Si Antes Te Hubiera Conocido"	Karol G	
61	December 15	"Si Antes Te Hubiera Conocido"	Karol G	
61	December 22	"Si Antes Te Hubiera Conocido"	Karol G	
61	December 29	"Si Antes Te Hubiera Conocido"	Karol G	

== See also ==
- List of Billboard Argentina Hot 100 top-ten singles in 2024
