= List of Billboard Argentina Hot 100 top-ten singles in 2024 =

This is a list of singles that charted in the top ten of the Billboard Argentina Hot 100 chart in 2024.

== Top-ten singles ==
An asterisk (*) represents that a single is in the top ten as of the issue dated May 5, 2024.

Key

- ◁ – indicates single's top 10 entry was also its Hot 100 debut

List of Billboard Hot 100 top ten singles that peaked in 2024
Top ten entry date	Single	Artist(s)	Peak	Peak date	Weeks in top ten	Ref.
January 7	"Sinvergüenza"	Emanero, Karina and J Mena featuring Ángela Torres	5	January 14	18*	
January 14	"Inocente"	Roze and Peipper	7	January 21	7	
January 21	"Una Foto (Remix)"	Mesita, Nicki Nicole and Tiago PZK featuring Emilia	1	January 21	16*	
January 21	"Bronceado (Remix)"	Márama, MYA and Robleis	5	January 21	7	
January 21	"Hola Perdida"	Luck Ra and Khea	1	March 3	16*	
January 28	"Bzrp Music Sessions, Vol. 58"	Bizarrap and Young Miko	3	January 28	8	
February 11	"Luna" (Note: The single re-entered the top ten on the week ending March 24, 2024.)	Feid and ATL Jacob	7	March 31	9*	
February 25	"Sin Querer"	Fer Vázquez and Flor Álvarez	10	February 25	1	
March 3	"Piel"	Tiago PZK and Ke Personajes	3	March 10	7	
March 3	"Gata Only"	Floyymenor featuring Cris MJ	3	March 17	10*	
March 10	"Tal para Cual"	Salastkbron and Omar Varela	6	March 31	9*	
March 24	"30 Grados"	El Turko featuring Mandale Flow	3	April 21	7*	
April 7	"Un Besito Más"	Salastkbron and Diel Paris	5	April 14	5*	
April 21	"Pa"	Tini	1	April 28	2	
April 21	"Primer Aviso"	María Becerra and Ivy Queen	10	April 21	1	
April 28	"Bésame (Remix)" ◁	Bhavi, Seven Kayne and Milo J featuring Tiago PZK, Khea and Neo Pistea	1	May 5	2*	
May 5	"Mil Preguntas"	The La Planta and Luana	10	May 5	1*	

=== 2023 peaks ===
List of Billboard Hot 100 top ten singles in 2024 that peaked in 2023
Top ten entry date	Single	Artist(s)	Peak	Peak date	Weeks in top ten	Ref.
August 13	"Mentiras" (Note: The single re-entered the top ten on the week ending January 7, 2024.)	Big One, Rusherking and Ulises Bueno	5	October 15	21	
September 3	"La Morocha"	Luck Ra and BM	1	September 24	28	
September 17	"El Amor de Mi Vida"	Los Ángeles Azules and María Becerra	2	October 8	18	
November 5	"Linda (Remix)"	Marka Akme, DJ Tao, Lauty Gram, Migrantes and Peipper	3	November 5	12	
November 12	"La Original" ◁	Emilia and Tini	1	November 19	20	
December 3	"Piscina"	María Becerra, Chencho Corleone and Ovy on the Drums	5	December 3	7	
December 10	"Que Me Falte Todo"	Luck Ra and Abel Pintos	3	January 7	19	
December 17	"Exclusive"	Emilia	3	December 31	8	
December 31	"Besos con Fernet" (Note: The single re-entered the top ten on the week ending January 14, 2024.)	Rusherking and Márama	8	December 31	2	

== See also ==
- List of Billboard Argentina Hot 100 number-one singles of 2024

== Notes ==
Notes for re-entries
