= List of Billboard Argentina Hot 100 number-one singles of 2019 =

The Billboard Argentina Hot 100 is a chart that ranks the best-performing songs in the Argentina. Its data, published by Billboard Argentina magazine and compiled by Nielsen SoundScan and BMAT/Vericast, is based collectively on each song's weekly physical and digital sales, as well as the amount of airplay received on Argentine radio stations and TV and streaming on online digital music outlets.

== Chart history ==
Key
†	Indicates best-performing single of 2019

No.	Issue date	Song	Artist(s)	Ref.
4	January 20	"Adán y Eva"	Paulo Londra	
5	January 27	"Calma (Remix)"	Pedro Capó and Farruko	
5	February 3	"Calma (Remix)"	Pedro Capó and Farruko	
5	February 10	"Calma (Remix)"	Pedro Capó and Farruko	
5	February 17	"Calma (Remix)"	Pedro Capó and Farruko	
5	February 24	"Calma (Remix)"	Pedro Capó and Farruko	
5	March 3	"Calma (Remix)"	Pedro Capó and Farruko	
5	March 10	"Calma (Remix)"	Pedro Capó and Farruko	
5	March 17	"Calma (Remix)"	Pedro Capó and Farruko	
6	March 24	"Con Calma"	Daddy Yankee featuring Snow	
6	March 31	"Con Calma"	Daddy Yankee featuring Snow	
6	April 7	"Con Calma"	Daddy Yankee featuring Snow	
6	April 14	"Con Calma"	Daddy Yankee featuring Snow	
6	April 21	"Con Calma"	Daddy Yankee featuring Snow	
6	April 28	"Con Calma"	Daddy Yankee and Katy Perry featuring Snow	
6	May 5	"Con Calma"	Daddy Yankee and Katy Perry featuring Snow	
6	May 12	"Con Calma"	Daddy Yankee and Katy Perry featuring Snow	
6	May 19	"Con Calma"	Daddy Yankee and Katy Perry featuring Snow	
6	May 26	"Con Calma"	Daddy Yankee and Katy Perry featuring Snow	
7	June 2	"Otro Trago" †	Sech featuring Darell	
7	June 9	"Otro Trago" †	Sech featuring Darell	
7	June 16	"Otro Trago" †	Sech featuring Darell	
7	June 23	"Otro Trago" †	Sech featuring Darell	
7	June 30	"Otro Trago" †	Sech featuring Darell	
7	July 7	"Otro Trago" †	Sech featuring Darell	
7	July 14	"Otro Trago" †	Sech featuring Darell	
8	July 21	"Con Altura"	Rosalía and J Balvin featuring El Guincho	
8	July 28	"Con Altura"	Rosalía and J Balvin featuring El Guincho	
8	August 4	"Con Altura"	Rosalía and J Balvin featuring El Guincho	
re	August 11	"Otro Trago" †	Sech, Ozuna and Anuel AA featuring Darell and Nicky Jam	
re	August 18	"Otro Trago" †	Sech, Ozuna and Anuel AA featuring Darell and Nicky Jam	
re	August 25	"Otro Trago" †	Sech, Ozuna and Anuel AA featuring Darell and Nicky Jam	
re	September 1	"Otro Trago" †	Sech, Ozuna and Anuel AA featuring Darell and Nicky Jam	
re	September 8	"Otro Trago" †	Sech, Ozuna and Anuel AA featuring Darell and Nicky Jam	
re	September 15	"Otro Trago" †	Sech, Ozuna and Anuel AA featuring Darell and Nicky Jam	
9	September 22	"China"	Anuel AA, Daddy Yankee and Karol G featuring Ozuna and J Balvin	
9	September 29	"China"	Anuel AA, Daddy Yankee and Karol G featuring Ozuna and J Balvin	
9	October 6	"China"	Anuel AA, Daddy Yankee and Karol G featuring Ozuna and J Balvin	
9	October 13	"China"	Anuel AA, Daddy Yankee and Karol G featuring Ozuna and J Balvin	
9	October 20	"China"	Anuel AA, Daddy Yankee and Karol G featuring Ozuna and J Balvin	
10	October 27	"Tutu"	Camilo and Pedro Capó	
10	November 3	"Tutu"	Camilo and Pedro Capó	
10	November 10	"Tutu"	Camilo and Pedro Capó	
11	November 17	"Que Tire Pa Lante"	Daddy Yankee	
11	November 24	"Que Tire Pa Lante"	Daddy Yankee	
11	December 1	"Que Tire Pa Lante"	Daddy Yankee	
11	December 8	"Que Tire Pa Lante"	Daddy Yankee	
11	December 15	"Que Tire Pa Lante"	Daddy Yankee	
11	December 22	"Que Tire Pa Lante"	Daddy Yankee	
11	December 29	"Que Tire Pa Lante"	Daddy Yankee	

== See also ==
- List of Billboard Argentina Hot 100 top-ten singles in 2019
- List of Billboard Argentina Hot 100 number-one singles of 2018
- List of Billboard Argentina Hot 100 number-one singles of 2020
