= List of Billboard Argentina Hot 100 number-one singles of 2020 =

The Billboard Argentina Hot 100 is a chart that ranks the best-performing songs in the Argentina. Its data, published by Billboard Argentina and Billboard magazines and compiled by Nielsen SoundScan and BMAT/Vericast, is based collectively on each song's weekly physical and digital sales, as well as the amount of airplay received on Argentine radio stations and TV and streaming on online digital music outlets.

== Chart history ==
No.	Issue date	Song	Artist(s)	Ref.
11	January 5	"Que Tire Pa Lante"	Daddy Yankee	
11	January 12	"Que Tire Pa Lante"	Daddy Yankee	
12	January 19	"Tusa"	Karol G and Nicki Minaj	
12	January 26	"Tusa"	Karol G and Nicki Minaj	
12	February 2	"Tusa"	Karol G and Nicki Minaj	
12	February 9	"Tusa"	Karol G and Nicki Minaj	
12	February 16	"Tusa"	Karol G and Nicki Minaj	
12	February 23	"Tusa"	Karol G and Nicki Minaj	
12	March 1	"Tusa"	Karol G and Nicki Minaj	
12	March 8	"Tusa"	Karol G and Nicki Minaj	
12	March 15	"Tusa"	Karol G and Nicki Minaj	
12	March 22	"Tusa"	Karol G and Nicki Minaj	
12	March 29	"Tusa"	Karol G and Nicki Minaj	
12	April 5	"Tusa"	Karol G and Nicki Minaj	
12	April 12	"Tusa"	Karol G and Nicki Minaj	
12	April 19	"Tusa"	Karol G and Nicki Minaj	
12	April 26	"Tusa"	Karol G and Nicki Minaj	
12	May 3	"Tusa"	Karol G and Nicki Minaj	
12	May 10	"Tusa"	Karol G and Nicki Minaj	
12	May 17	"Tusa"	Karol G and Nicki Minaj	
12	May 24	"Tusa"	Karol G and Nicki Minaj	
12	May 31	"Tusa"	Karol G and Nicki Minaj	
12	June 7	"Tusa"	Karol G and Nicki Minaj	
12	June 14	"Tusa"	Karol G and Nicki Minaj	
12	June 21	"Tusa"	Karol G and Nicki Minaj	
12	June 28	"Tusa"	Karol G and Nicki Minaj	
12	July 5	"Tusa"	Karol G and Nicki Minaj	
13	July 12	"La Jeepeta (Remix)"	Nio García, Anuel AA and Myke Towers featuring Juanka and Brray	
13	July 19	"La Jeepeta (Remix)"	Nio García, Anuel AA and Myke Towers featuring Juanka and Brray	
13	July 26	"La Jeepeta (Remix)"	Nio García, Anuel AA and Myke Towers featuring Juanka and Brray	
14	August 2	"Tattoo (Remix)"	Rauw Alejandro and Camilo	
15	August 9	"Mamichula"	Trueno and Nicki Nicole featuring Bizarrap	
15	August 16	"Mamichula"	Trueno and Nicki Nicole featuring Bizarrap	
15	August 23	"Mamichula"	Trueno and Nicki Nicole featuring Bizarrap	
15	August 30	"Mamichula"	Trueno and Nicki Nicole featuring Bizarrap	
16	September 6	"Hawái"	Maluma	
16	September 13	"Hawái"	Maluma	
16	September 20	"Hawái"	Maluma	
16	September 27	"Hawái"	Maluma	
16	October 4	"Hawái"	Maluma	
16	October 11	"Hawái"	Maluma	
16	October 18	"Hawái"	Maluma	
16	October 25	"Hawái"	Maluma	
16	November 1	"Hawái"	Maluma	
17	November 8	"Vida de Rico"	Camilo	
re	November 15	"Hawái"	Maluma and The Weeknd	
re	November 22	"Hawái"	Maluma and The Weeknd	
re	November 29	"Hawái"	Maluma and The Weeknd	
18	December 6	"Dakiti"	Bad Bunny and Jhay Cortez	
18	December 13	"Dakiti"	Bad Bunny and Jhay Cortez	
19	December 20	"Bichota"	Karol G	
19	December 27	"Bichota"	Karol G	

== See also ==
- List of Billboard Argentina Hot 100 top-ten singles in 2020
