= List of Billboard Argentina Hot 100 number-one singles of 2025 =

The Billboard Argentina Hot 100 is a chart that ranks the best-performing songs in the Argentina. Its data, published by Billboard Argentina and Billboard magazines and compiled by Nielsen SoundScan and BMAT/Vericast, is based collectively on each song's weekly physical and digital sales, as well as the amount of airplay received on Argentine radio stations and TV and streaming on online digital music outlets.

== Chart history ==
No.	Issue date	Song	Artist(s)	Ref.
re	January 4	"Si Antes Te Hubiera Conocido"	Karol G	
62	January 11	"Amor de Vago"	La T y La M featuring Malandro	
62	January 18	"Amor de Vago"	La T y La M featuring Malandro	
62	January 25	"Amor de Vago"	La T y La M featuring Malandro	
62	February 1	"Amor de Vago"	La T y La M featuring Malandro	
62	February 8	"Amor de Vago"	La T y La M featuring Malandro	
62	February 15	"Amor de Vago"	La T y La M featuring Malandro	
62	February 22	"Amor de Vago"	La T y La M featuring Malandro	
62	March 1	"Amor de Vago"	La T y La M featuring Malandro	
62	March 8	"Amor de Vago"	La T y La M featuring Malandro	
62	March 15	"Amor de Vago"	La T y La M featuring Malandro	
63	March 22	"Parte & Choke"	Jombriel, Alex Krack and Jøtta	
re	March 29	"Amor de Vago"	La T y La M featuring Malandro	
re	April 5	"Amor de Vago"	La T y La M featuring Malandro	
64	April 12	"Blackout"	Emilia, Tini and Nicki Nicole	
64	April 19	"Blackout"	Emilia, Tini and Nicki Nicole	
65	April 26	"Con Otra"	Cazzu	
65	May 3	"Con Otra"	Cazzu	
65	May 10	"Con Otra"	Cazzu	
66	May 17	"La Plena (W Sound 05)"	W Sound featuring Beéle and Ovy on the Drums	
67	May 24	"Ramen Para Dos"	María Becerra and Paulo Londra	
67	May 31	"Ramen Para Dos"	María Becerra and Paulo Londra	
67	June 7	"Ramen Para Dos"	María Becerra and Paulo Londra	
re	June 14	"Con Otra"	Cazzu	
re	June 21	"Con Otra"	Cazzu	
re	June 28	"Con Otra"	Cazzu	
re	July 5	"Con Otra"	Cazzu	
re	July 12	"Con Otra"	Cazzu	
68	July 19	"Tu Jardín Con Enanitos"	Roze, Max Carra, Valen and Ramky	
68	July 26	"Tu Jardín Con Enanitos"	Roze, Max Carra, Valen and Ramky	
68	August 2	"Tu Jardín Con Enanitos"	Roze, Max Carra, Valen and Ramky	
69	August 9	"Tu Misterioso Alguien"	Miranda!	
69	August 16	"Tu Misterioso Alguien"	Miranda!	
69	August 23	"Tu Misterioso Alguien"	Miranda!	
69	August 30	"Tu Misterioso Alguien"	Miranda!	
re	September 6	"Tu Jardín Con Enanitos"	Roze, Max Carra, Valen and Ramky	
re	September 13	"Tu Jardín Con Enanitos"	Roze, Max Carra, Valen and Ramky	
re	September 20	"Tu Jardín Con Enanitos"	Roze, Max Carra, Valen and Ramky	
70	September 27	"Tu Misterioso Alguien (Cuarteto)"	Miranda! and Luck Ra	
70	October 4	"Tu Misterioso Alguien (Cuarteto)"	Miranda! and Luck Ra	
70	October 11	"Tu Misterioso Alguien (Cuarteto)"	Miranda! and Luck Ra	
70	October 18	"Tu Misterioso Alguien (Cuarteto)"	Miranda! and Luck Ra	
70	October 25	"Tu Misterioso Alguien (Cuarteto)"	Miranda! and Luck Ra	
70	November 1	"Tu Misterioso Alguien (Cuarteto)"	Miranda! and Luck Ra	
70	November 8	"Tu Misterioso Alguien (Cuarteto)"	Miranda! and Luck Ra	
70	November 15	"Tu Misterioso Alguien (Cuarteto)"	Miranda! and Luck Ra	
71	September 27	"Bzrp Music Sessions, Vol. 0/66"	Bizarrap and Daddy Yankee	
71	November 29	"Bzrp Music Sessions, Vol. 0/66"	Bizarrap and Daddy Yankee	
re	December 6	"Tu Misterioso Alguien (Cuarteto)"	Miranda! and Luck Ra	
72	December 13	"La Perla"	Rosalía and Yahritza y Su Esencia	
73	December 23	"Tu Misterioso Alguien (Cuarteto)"	Miranda! and Luck Ra	
