= Por Las Noches =

2021 single by Peso Pluma

Single by Peso Pluma
- Language: Spanish
- English title: "At Nights"
- Released: June 11, 2021
- Genre: Regional Mexican; urban sierreño; corridos tumbados
- Length: 4:00
- Label: El Cartel de Los Ángeles
- Songwriter: Hassan Emilio Kabande Laija

Peso Pluma singles chronology
"Lo Que Me Das" (2021)	"Por Las Noches" (2021)	"Todo es Playa" (2021)

Music video
- "Por Las Noches" on YouTube

"Por Las Noches" (English: At Nights) is a song recorded and performed by the Mexican regional music singer Peso Pluma. The song was written by the singer in its entirety. It was released as a single on June 11, 2021, through the independent record company El Cartel de Los Ángeles.

The single went viral on the short video platform TikTok in early 2023, so in January of that year they increased their reproductions on music platforms. "Por Las Noches" peaked at number 28 on the Billboard Hot 100 chart, being his third entry on that list, which made him equal at that time the record of Paulina Rubio as the Mexican with the most entries. That also gave Peso Pluma his first solo streaming and sales success.

== Reception ==
=== Critical and media commentary ===
Lucas Escobar Calle from Univision expressed: "This song shows that his success is not only in collaborations and that alone he can also create hits".

=== Commercial performance ===
The song debuted at number 36 on the Hot Latin Songs chart in the United States the week of February 5, 2023, a year and a half after its release as a single. The week of March 5, it entered the Global 200 debuting at number 150, similarly, it entered the most important music list in that country, the Billboard Hot 100 in position number 92, the week of March 19 of the same year. In Mexico, the song entered the Mexico Songs chart at position 16 the week of March 19, and in Ecuador the week of April 23 debuted in position 24.

== Music and lyrics ==
Musically, "Por Las Noches" is a ranchera song of regional Mexican music that mixes urban sierreño sounds and corridos tumbados. Lyrically, the song talks about the breakup of a couple who is already unable to return to a relationship and the emotional pain that is felt after this. The lyrics includes, "Cuando por las noches recordaba todo / El olor de aquel perfume sobre todo / Las sábanas blancas donde te escondían dentro / Eres intocable como joya de oro".

== Music video ==
A music video released on November 23, 2022 by posting on Prajin Music Group's official YouTube channel and was directed by Shot X Concrete and has accumulated more than 200 million views, managed to reach the top 10 trending videos in Mexico in April 2023.

== Charts ==
=== Weekly charts ===
Weekly chart performance for "Por Las Noches"
Chart (2023)	Peak position
Argentina (Argentina Hot 100)	72
Bolivia Songs (Billboard)	21
Ecuador Songs (Billboard)	20
Global 200 (Billboard)	16
Mexico (Billboard)	5
US Billboard Hot 100	28
US Hot Latin Songs (Billboard)	4

=== Year-end charts ===
Year-end chart performance for "Por Las Noches"
Chart (2023)	Position
Global 200 (Billboard)	90
US Billboard Hot 100	86
US Hot Latin Songs (Billboard)	9

== Remix ==
"Por Las Noches" (remix)

Single by Peso Pluma and Nicki Nicole
- Language: Spanish
- English title: At Nights (Remix)
- Released: February 27, 2023
- Genre: Regional Mexican; ranchera; urban sierreño; corridos tumbados
- Length: 3:42
- Label: Prajin Parlay; Sony Latin
- Songwriters: Hassan Emilio Kabande Laija; Nicole Denise Cucco
- Producers: Peso Pluma; George Prajin; Jesús Iván Leal Reyes; Jesús Roberto Laija García; Ernesto Fernández

Peso Pluma singles chronology
"El Azul" (2023)	"Por Las Noches" (remix) (2023)	"El Hechizo" (2023)

Nicki Nicole singles chronology
"Marisola" (remix) (2023)	"Por Las Noches" (remix) (2023)	"No Voy a Llorar :')" (2023)

Music video
- "Por Las Noches (Remix)" on YouTube

A remix version of the song was released on February 27, 2023 alongside Argentine urban music singer Nicki Nicole, written by both artists and produced by Peso Pluma, George Prajin, Jesús Iván Leal Reyes, Jesús Roberto Laija García and Ernesto Fernández.

=== Background ===
Peso Pluma said in an interview that Nicki was the one who had contacted him first to re-record the song together, making it clear that he liked listening to it. He immediately agreed to this.

=== Critical reception ===
Gilberto Coronel of the newspaper El Debate named it as: "The fusion of two talents that turned out to be a resounding success". Masiel Ágreda from MVS described it as "a song of heartbreak" and was positive about the good reception of the public. Julián Jaramillo from the site AllAccess México expressed that it was: "An organic collaboration between the two" and culminated with: "Nicki Nicole brings a lot to the track with her unique voice and her personal romantic history". Valentina Cardona of Fame Magazine referred to the song as "a moving and powerful track". Jessica Roiz of Billboard magazine commented on the song: "...it's a beautiful song that blends with Nicki's soft, sweet voice".

=== Music and lyrics ===
Musically, more acoustic sounds, rancheros and mariachi arrangements were added to the track of the song, unlike the original version. Lyrically, the song talks about the breakup of a couple who is already unable to return to a relationship and the emotional pain that is felt after this. The lyrics includes, "Cuando por las noches recordaba todo / El olor de aquel perfume sobre todo / Las sábanas blancas donde te escondían dentro / Eres intocable como joya de oro".

=== Music video ===
A music video premiered on March 1, 2023 featuring both artists. The video was recorded in Valparaíso, Chile and was directed by Pepe Garrido, produced by Patricio Zapata and starred by Chilean actor Daniel Antivilo. On the day of its publication, the video reached No. 2 in trends in Mexico.

=== Certifications ===
Certifications for "Por Las Noches" (remix)
Region	Certification	Certified units/sales
Mexico (AMPROFON)	2× Platinum	280,000^{‡}
^{‡} Sales+streaming figures based on certification alone.
