= Marisola =

2022 single by Stars Music Chile, Cris MJ, and Standly

Single by Stars Music Chile, Cris MJ, and Standly
- Language: Spanish
- English title: "Mari-alone"
- Released: July 22, 2022
- Genre: Reggaeton
- Label: Stars Chile; Virgin Chile
- Songwriters: Cristopher Álvarez García; Camilo Paredes Aguirre
- Producers: Moustache; Magicenelbeat

Stars Music Chile singles chronology
"Los Malvekes" (2021)	"Marisola" (2022)	"Marisola" (remix) (2022)

Cris MJ singles chronology
"Paz Mental" (2022)	"Marisola" (2022)	"Pantano" (remix) (2022)

Standly singles chronology
"Vente al Party" (2022)	"Marisola" (2022)	"Vio con la Poli" (2022)

Music video
- "Marisola" on YouTube

"Marisola" is a song by Chilean record label Stars Music Chile with Chilean singers Cris MJ and Standly. It was released on July 22, 2022, by Stars Chile and Virgin Chile. It was written by the mentioned artists and produced by Moustache and Magicenelbeat. A remix version with Argentine singers Duki and Nicki Nicole was released on December 15, 2022.

The song was ranked number one on charts in Argentina, Chile and Peru, as it was certified in Argentina, Chile and Spain. The original version was nominated for La Junta Awards in the category of Best Reggaeton Song, while the remix version was nominated for the 2023 MTV MIAW Awards as Supreme Perreo and for the 2023 Tu Música Urbano Awards as Remix of the Year.

== Background and lyrics ==
"Marisola" is a Chilean reggaeton song that "talks about an empowered, independent and self-sufficient woman who, although she does not need anyone, any man would like to be with her and conquer her". It was written by the performing artists: Cristopher Álvarez García "Cris MJ" and Camilo Paredes Aguirre "Standly". The production of the song was carried out by Moustache and Magicenelbeat.

== Commercial performance ==
After going viral on TikTok, "Marisola" debuted on the Billboard Chile Songs chart at number 5, dated the week of August 6, 2022. Two weeks later, on August 20, 2022, it ranked at number one on the chart. Four months after its release, the single was certified diamond in its country of origin Chile and platinum in Argentina.

== Remix ==
"Marisola" (remix)

Single by Cris MJ, Duki, and Nicki Nicole, featuring Standly and Stars Music Chile
- Language: Spanish
- Released: December 15, 2022
- Genre: Reggaeton
- Label: Stars Chile; Virgin Chile; Universal Chile
- Songwriters: Cristopher Álvarez García; Camilo Paredes Aguirre; Mauro Ezequiel Lombardo; Nicole Denise Cucco
- Producers: Moustache; Magicenelbeat

Cris MJ singles chronology
"Paz Mental" (2022)	"Marisola" (remix) (2022)	"Pantano" (remix) (2022)

Duki singles chronology
"Duki: Bzrp Music Sessions, Vol. 50" (2022)	"Marisola" (remix) (2022)	"3 Estrellas en el Conjunto" (2022)

Nicki Nicole singles chronology
"Lo Tengo" (2022)	"Marisola" (remix) (2022)	"Por las Noches" (remix) (2023)

Standly singles chronology
"Vente al Party" (2022)	"Marisola" (remix) (2022)	"Vio con la Poli" (2022)

Stars Music Chile singles chronology
"Marisola" (2022)	"Marisola" (remix) (2022)	"Salió de Noche" (2023)

Music video
- "Marisola" (remix) on YouTube

On December 15, 2022, a remix version was released with the participation of Argentine singers and rappers Duki and Nicki Nicole. The premiere of the collaboration was announced on December 11, 2020 by the artists themselves, showing a preview of the song via Instagram. For her part, Nicki Nicole posted a part of the song on Twitter.

=== Commercial performance ===
Thanks to the release of the remix, "Marisola" ranked at number one on the Billboard Argentina Hot 100, dated the week of December 31, 2022, displacing "La Bachata" by Manuel Turizo. It also entered in Bolivia, Ecuador and Peru Songs charts. Regardless of the original version, the remix of "Marisola" topped the Peru airplay chart, as it peaked at number 10 on the Uruguay airplay chart and number 20 on the Spanish chart. Likewise, it was certified double platinum in Spain.

== Nominations ==
Nominations for "Marisola"
Awards	Year	Category	Result	Ref.
La Junta Awards	2022	Best Reggaeton Song	Nominated	

Nominations for "Marisola" (remix)
Awards	Year	Category	Result	Ref.
MTV MIAW Awards	2023	Supreme Perreo	Nominated	
Tu Música Urbano Awards	2023	Remix of the Year	Nominated	

== Charts ==
Weekly combined chart performance for "Marisola" and "Marisola" (remix)
Chart (2022–2023)	Peak position
Argentina (Argentina Hot 100)	1
Bolivia Songs (Billboard)	10
Chile Songs (Billboard)	1
Ecuador Songs (Billboard)	21
Global 200 (Billboard)	70
Peru Songs (Billboard)	3

Weekly chart performance only for "Marisola" (remix)
Chart (2023)	Peak position
Peru (Hot 100 Perú) (Note: The Hot 100 Perú chart were launched in August 2023. Therefore, "Marisola" (remix) did not have a full run on the chart.)	40
Peru Airplay (Monitor Latino)	1
Uruguay Airplay (Monitor Latino)	10
Spain (Promusicae)	20

== Certifications ==
Certifications for "Marisola"
Region	Certification
Argentina	Platinum
Chile	Diamond

Certifications and sales for "Marisola" (remix)
Region	Certification	Certified units/sales
Spain (Promusicae)	2× Platinum	120,000^{‡}
^{‡} Sales+streaming figures based on certification alone.

== See also ==
- List of Billboard Argentina Hot 100 number-one singles of 2023
- List of Billboard Argentina Hot 100 top-ten singles in 2023
