= Gotti A =

Studio album by Tiago PZK
- Released: 4 July 2024
- Recorded: 2023–2024
- Length: 39:19
- Language: Spanish
- Label: Warner Latina
- Producers: Zecca; Tatool; Yeti Beats; Asan; Oscar Görres; Richard Zastenker; Alejandro Robledo; La Creme; Cristian Camilo Ortíz; Filly Andrés Lima Maya; Keityn; L.E.X.U.Z; Andrés Torres; Mauricio Rengifo; Leven Kali; Sol Was; John Alexis Mendoza; Pontus Persson; Bryan Taylor; Charlie Heat

Tiago PZK chronology
Portales (2022)	Gotti A (2024)	Gotti B (2025)

Singles from Gotti A
- 1. "Piel" Released: 1 February 2024; 2. "Mi Corazón" Released: 23 May 2024; 3. "De Vuelta" Released: 4 July 2024; 4. "Alegría" Released: 8 August 2024

Gotti A is the second studio album by Argentine singer Tiago PZK. The album was released on 4 July 2024 through Warner Music Latina. The album's title also refers to the singer's alter ego, Gotti A.

== Background and release ==
In February 2024, Tiago PZK released "Piel" with Ke Personajes, as the first preview of the album. The singer stated that the album has been in development for a year and a half, and that also during development they made more than 90 songs, but selected only 14 for the track-list.

On 21 June 2024, Tiago PZK announced through his social networks the release date of the album, and also the list of songs and collaborations.

== Composition ==
The album is made up of 14 songs, with "Alegría" which was revealed and released a month after the album's release. The album mixes various musical genres, such as reggaeton, merengue, latin trap, ballads, R&B and EDM.

=== Songs ===
The album begins with the first track "Todas Las Estrellas" which begins in a romantic, nostalgic way and with certain regrets about the facts. Entering the song, the rhythm changes, as if "Tiago gave the microphone to Gotti A" and the rap, the bars and the spirit of battles with which PZK was known arrive, even using the double-tempo resource in certain cases. It is followed by "Adicción", a salsa track with romantic lyrics that reflect the reality of those impossible loves. The third track "De Vuelta" with Colombian singer Manuel Turizo, is also the focus track of the album. In addition, it is the third collaboration between both singers, after "Salimo de Noche" and the remix of "Hood". The fifth track "Alegría" featuring Brazilian singer Anitta and Argentinian Emilia, a song that had not been released until a month later. In "Party BB" with American singer Justin Quiles, it is a reggaeton song where the lyrics "breathe night, party, bowling and passion". Tiago had revealed that initially, Panamanian singer Sech was his first choice to join the song, but that Quiles' result was what he expected the most. The song "Piel" by the Argentine cumbia group Ke Personajes, and the song would later become a hit, is a cumbia described as "sensual and confessional". The eighth song "La Despedida" is a latin pop song that talks about a loving farewell and how to face a breakup, showing how difficult it is to continue and move on in life. The song also finds sounds that are reminiscent of the productions of Bizarrap, Martín Garrix or David Guetta. The tenth track "Mi Corazón" has a calm melody that is combined with Tiago's melodic voice as it tells the story of a couple who, no matter how much they have tried, cannot return to what was before in their relationship, which ends up becoming in a breakup. The eleventh track "Cristal" with compatriot singer Nicki Nicole, is an experimental R&B with lyrics that talk about infidelity, manipulation and resentment that is reflected in "crystal tears". Tiago said in an exclusive that he had traveled to Sweden and that he had met with the singer to record the song and that it is undoubtedly one of his favorites on the album. The twelfth track "Tony" is where the singer ventures into Argentine rhythms such as the chacarera. The entire song is accompanied by an acoustic guitar and the lyrics reflect on fame, respect and money. In the song "Griselda", the same name as the song that the singer's mother has, it was written for her from the heart and tears as a tribute for everything she did for Tiago. The album closes with "La Última" where in the song, you can hear the two best versions of Tiago and Gotti A, fused into a reggaeton with references to Bad Bunny and a Daddy Yankee sample. Additionally, it is the longest song on the album.

== Singles ==
The album's first single, "Piel" featuring Argentine cumbia band Ke Personajes, was released on February 1, 2024, and received widespread success. It was preceded by the second single "Mi Corazón", released on May 23. On July 4, with the release of the album, the third single "De Vuelta" was released with Colombian singer Manuel Turizo, and also considered the focus track of the album. The following month, on August 8, the album's fourth single and missing song "Alegría" was released alongside Brazilian singer Anitta and Argentine singer Emilia, and it also turned out to be a hit.

== Track listing ==
Gotti A track listing
No.	Title	Writer(s)	Producer(s)	Length
1.	"Todas Las Estrellas"	Tiago Uriel Pacheco Lezcano	Oscar Görres; Richard Zastenker; Tatool	2:07
2.	"Addición"	Enzo Ezequiel Sauthier; Tiago Uriel Pacheco Lezcano	Zecca; Tatool; Asan	2:18
3.	"De Vuelta" (with Manuel Turizo)	Manuel Turizo Zapata; Enzo Ezequiel Sauthier; Tiago Uriel Pacheco Lezcano	Zecca; Tatool	2:47
4.	"I'm Blessed" (with Trueno)	Mateo Palacios Corazzina; Tiago Uriel Pacheco Lezcano	Tatool; Yeti Beats	2:28
5.	"Alegría" (with Anitta and Emilia)	Larissa de Macedo Machado; María Emilia Mernes; Tiago Uriel Pacheco Lezcano	Zecca; Tatool	2:45
6.	"Party BB" (with Justin Quiles)	Justin Rafael Quiles Rivera; Kevyn Mauricio Cruz Moreno; Tiago Uriel Pacheco Lezcano	La Creme; Tatool	3:19
7.	"Piel" (with Ke Personajes)	Tiago Uriel Pacheco Lezcano	Alejandro Robledo; Cristian Camilo Ortíz; Filly Andrés Lima Maya; Keityn; L.E.X.U.Z; Tatool	2:22
8.	"La Despedida"	Mauricio Rengifo; Tiago Uriel Pacheco Lezcano	Andrés Torres; Mauricio Rengifo; Tatool	2:45
9.	"RCP" (with Duki)	Mauro Ezequiel Lombardo; Tiago Uriel Pacheco Lezcano	Zecca; Tatool	3:03
10.	"Mi Corazón"	Leven Kali; Santiago Ruíz; Sara Schell; Sol Was; Tiago Uriel Pacheco Lezcano; Guillermo Novellis; Pablo Tisera	Leven Kali; Tatool; Sol Was	2:44
11.	"Cristal" (with Nicki Nicole)	Nicole Denise Cucco; Tiago Uriel Pacheco Lezcano	John Alexis Mendoza; Pontus Persson; Tatool	2:31
12.	"Tony"	Tiago Uriel Pacheco Lezcano	Bryan Taylor; Oscar Görres; Richard Zastenker; Tatool	2:38
13.	"Griselda"	Elvira Anderfjärd; Marcos Agustín Romero; Santiago Gabriel Ruíz; Tiago Uriel Pacheco Lezcano	Puntus Persson; Richard Zastenker; Tatool	3:05
14.	"La Última"	Sara Schell; Tiago Uriel Pacheco Lezcano	Charlie Heat; Tatool	4:27
Total length:				39:19

== Charts ==
Chart performance for Gotti A
Chart (2024)	Peak position
Spanish Albums (Promusicae)	19
