= Entre nosotros =

2021 single by Tiago PZK and Lit Killah

"Entre Nosotros"

Single by Tiago PZK and Lit Killah

from the album Portales
- Released: 8 July 2021
- Length: 3:13
- Label: Mad Move; Warner Latin
- Songwriters: Tiago Uriel Pacheco Lezcano; Mauro Román Monzón; Daniel Ismael Real
- Producer: Big One

Tiago PZK singles chronology
"Prende la Cámara" (2021)	"Entre Nosotros" (2021)	"Loco" (2021)

Lit Killah singles chronology
"California" (2021)	"Entre Nosotros" (2021)	"Déjame Tranki" (2021)

Music video
- "Entre Nosotros" on YouTube

"Entre Nosotros" (transl. "Between Us") is a song by Argentine rappers and singers Tiago PZK and Lit Killah. It was released on 8 July 2021 through Mad Move Records. This is the fourth song on which the two artists collaborate. The song reached #1 on the Billboard Argentina Hot 100 chart, being the third song by Tiago PZK to reach number 1 and the second by Lit Killah. The music video for the song reached 90 million views on YouTube in just one month. It is also the third single from Tiago PZK's upcoming debut studio album to be released in late 2021.

== Background ==
The song was released as the third single from Tiago PZK's upcoming debut album. The song reached Spotify's Global Top 50 placing it on Spotify's most-played songs list. Although the song was released on 8 July 2021, it took weeks for the song to hit the charts thanks to the song trending on the short video platform TikTok.

== Charts ==
=== Weekly and monthly ===
Chart performance for "Entre Nosotros"
Chart (2021)	Peak position
Argentina (Argentina Hot 100)	1
Bolivia (Monitor Latino)	10
Costa Rica (Monitor Latino)	7
Global 200 (Billboard)	55
Nicaragua (Monitor Latino)	13
Paraguay (Monitor Latino)	14
Paraguay (SGP)	11
Peru (Monitor Latino)	3
Spain (PROMUSICAE)	37
Uruguay (CUD)	1
Uruguay (Monitor Latino)	14

== Certifications ==
Region	Certification	Certified units/sales
Argentina (CAPIF)	2× Platinum	40,000^{*}
Colombia	Gold	
Mexico (AMPROFON)	3× Platinum+Gold	490,000^{‡}
Spain (PROMUSICAE)	Gold	20,000^{‡}
United States (RIAA)	Platinum (Latin)	60,000^{‡}
^{*} Sales figures based on certification alone.^{‡} Sales+streaming figures based on certification alone.

== Remix version ==
"Entre Nosotros (Remix)"

Single by Tiago PZK, Lit Killah, María Becerra and Nicki Nicole
- Language: Spanish
- Released: 5 January 2022
- Length: 4:20
- Label: Warner Latin
- Songwriters: Tiago Uriel Pacheco; Mauro Román Monzón; María Becerra; Nicole Denise Cucco; Daniel Ismael Real
- Producer: Big One

Tiago PZK singles chronology
"Tiago PZK: Bzrp Music Sessions, Vol. 48" (2021)	"Entre Nosotros (Remix)" (2022)	"Now" (2022)

Lit Killah singles chronology
"Como + Nadie" (2021)	"Entre Nosotros (Remix)" (2022)	"Ayer" (2022)

María Becerra singles chronology
"Los Tragos" (2021)	"Entre Nosotros (Remix)" (2022)	"Tranquila" (2022)

Nicki Nicole singles chronology
"Formentera" (2021)	"Entre Nosotros (Remix)" (2022)	"Dangerous" (2022)

Music video
- "Entre Nosotros (remix)" on YouTube

Days before the end of 2021, the artists Tiago PZK and Lit Killah announced on their social networks that the song would have a remix, the invited artists were confirmed days before the song was released, the remix would be accompanied by the Argentine rapper Nicki Nicole and Argentine singer María Becerra. The song was finally released on 5 January 2022 on Tiago PZK's YouTube channel through Warner Music Latin.

=== Charts ===
Chart performance for "Entre Nosotros (remix)"
Chart (2022)	Peak position
Argentina (Argentina Hot 100)	1
Argentina National Songs (Monitor Latino)	7
Bolivia (Monitor Latino)	5
Costa Rica (Monitor Latino)	15
Mexico Espanol Airplay (Billboard)	20
Nicaragua (Monitor Latino)	12
Paraguay (SGP)	12
Peru (Monitor Latino)	1
Spain (PROMUSICAE)	10
Uruguay (CUD)	7

=== Certifications ===
Region	Certification	Certified units/sales
Spain (PROMUSICAE)	Platinum	60,000^{‡}
United States (RIAA)	Gold (Latin)	30,000^{‡}
Streaming
Chile (PROFOVI)	Platinum	19,314,165
^{‡} Sales+streaming figures based on certification alone.
