= Lala (Myke Towers song) =

Single by Myke Towers

from the album La Vida Es Una
- Language: Spanish
- Released: July 27, 2023
- Recorded: 2023
- Genre: Reggaeton
- Length: 3:17
- Label: One World; Warner Latina; Warner
- Songwriters: Michael Torres Monge; Anthony Edward Ralph Parrilla Medina; Carlos Alberto Butter Aguila; Jean Carlos Hernandez-Espinell; Julio Emmanuel Batista Santos; Orlando J. Cepeda Matos; Siggy Vazquez Rodriguez
- Producers: Chalko; YannC El Armónico

Myke Towers singles chronology
"Mi Lova" (2023)	"Lala" (2023)	"Los Dueños De la Calle (remix)" (2023)

Music video
- "Lala" on YouTube

Lyric video
- "Lala" on YouTube

"Lala" is a song by Puerto Rican rapper and singer Myke Towers. It was released on March 23, 2023, and later as a single on July 27, 2023 through One World, Warner Latina and Warner Records, as track 22 from his third studio album La Vida Es Una. The song achieved commercial success in July 2023, several months after its first release as an album track. The song was later featured on the soundtrack for the video game EA Sports FC 24

== Background and composition ==
The "sing-song", described as "fun in [its] own right", talks about different motions of a flirt, examining feelings of affection and jealousy. Although the meaning behind the chorus has not been explained, it is widely believed to be ambiguous. Majority of users picking up the track on TikTok are shown making a tongue movement.

Following a surge in popularity on TikTok in late June 2023, the song went on to chart in the top 5 of multiple countries on Spotify, becoming Towers' highest charting song on several streaming platforms to date.

== Promotion ==
=== Lyric video ===
The lyric video premiered on Myke Towers' official YouTube channel on March 23, 2023 along with other lyric videos that premiered simultaneously on the same day for the album's release "La Vida Es Una".

=== Music video ===
The official music video premiered on July 27, 2023 through Myke Towers' official YouTube channel. María Pedraza appears as the female protagonist.

== Charts ==
=== Weekly charts ===
Weekly chart performance for "Lala"
Chart (2023)	Peak position
Argentina Hot 100 (Billboard)	1
Argentina (CAPIF)	1
Bolivia (Billboard)	1
Bolivia (Monitor Latino)	8
Chile (Billboard)	1
Chile (Monitor Latino)	10
Colombia (Billboard)	1
Colombia (Monitor Latino)	1
Costa Rica Streaming Songs (FONOTICA)	1
Costa Rica (Monitor Latino)	13
Dominican Republic (Monitor Latino)	1
Dominican Republic (SODINPRO)	1
Ecuador (Billboard)	1
Ecuador (Monitor Latino)	4
El Salvador (Monitor Latino)	1
Global 200 (Billboard)	3
Guatemala (Monitor Latino)	6
Honduras (Monitor Latino)	1
Italy (FIMI)	15
Mexico (Billboard)	3
Mexico (Monitor Latino)	20
Nicaragua (Monitor Latino)	1
Panama (Monitor Latino)	2
Paraguay (Monitor Latino)	1
Peru (Hot 100 Perú)	1
Peru (Monitor Latino)	1
Portugal (AFP)	7
Puerto Rico (Monitor Latino)	15
Spain (Promusicae)	1
Switzerland (Schweizer Hitparade)	31
Uruguay (Monitor Latino)	10
US Billboard Hot 100	43
US Hot Latin Songs (Billboard)	4
US Latin Rhythm Airplay (Billboard)	1
Venezuela Airplay (Record Report)	74

=== Year-end charts ===
2023 year-end chart performance for "Lala"
Chart (2023)	Position
Global 200 (Billboard)	76
Italy (FIMI)	96
Switzerland (Schweizer Hitparade)	100
US Hot Latin Songs (Billboard)	24

2024 year-end chart performance for "Lala"
Chart (2024)	Position
Global 200 (Billboard)	153

== Certifications ==
Certifications for "Lala"
Region	Certification	Certified units/sales
Canada (Music Canada)	Gold	40,000^{‡}
France (SNEP)	Gold	100,000^{‡}
Italy (FIMI)	2× Platinum	200,000^{‡}
Portugal (AFP)	2× Platinum	20,000^{‡}
Spain (Promusicae)	8× Platinum	480,000^{‡}
United States (RIAA)	31× Platinum (Latin)	1,860,000^{‡}
^{‡} Sales+streaming figures based on certification alone.

== See also ==
- List of Billboard Argentina Hot 100 top-ten singles in 2023
- List of Billboard Argentina Hot 100 number-one singles of 2023
- List of best-selling singles in Spain
