= List of Billboard Argentina Hot 100 top-ten singles in 2019 =

This is a list of singles that charted in the top ten of the Billboard Argentina Hot 100 chart in 2019.

== Top-ten singles ==
Key

- ◁ – indicates single's top 10 entry was also its Hot 100 debut
- (#) – 2019 year-end top 10 single position and rank

List of Billboard Hot 100 top ten singles that peaked in 2019
Top ten entry date	Single	Artist(s)	Peak	Peak date	Weeks in top ten	Ref.
Singles from 2018
December 16	"Me Voy"	Rombai	5	February 10	14	
Singles from 2019
January 20	"Calma (Remix)" (#2) (Note: The single re-entered the top ten on the week ending October 13, 2019.) (Note: The single re-entered the top ten on the week ending December 1, 2019.)	Pedro Capó, Farruko and Alicia Keys (Note: Alicia Keys started being credited as a featured artist from the week ending May 5, 2019.)	1	January 27	41	
January 20	"Adictiva"	Daddy Yankee and Anuel AA	5	January 27	9	
January 20	"Leña Para el Carbón" (Note: The single re-entered the top ten on the week ending March 10, 2019.)	DJ Alex	4	February 3	11	
January 20	"Sin Culpa"	Duki featuring DrefQuila	6	January 27	5	
January 27	"Reggaetón" (Note: The single re-entered the top ten on the week ending April 7, 2019.)	J Balvin	9	January 27	3	
February 3	"Secreto"	Anuel AA and Karol G	3	February 17	17	
February 17	"Imposible" (Note: The single re-entered the top ten on the week ending March 24, 2019.)	Luis Fonsi and Ozuna	8	February 24	4	
February 24	"Con Calma" (#3) (Note: The single re-entered the top ten on the week ending November 10, 2019.) (Note: The single re-entered the top ten on the week ending December 29, 2019.)	Daddy Yankee and Katy Perry (Note: Katy Perry started being credited as a featured artist from the week ending April 28, 2019.) featuring Snow	1	March 24	41	
March 10	"Un Año"	Sebastián Yatra and Reik	5	March 31	10	
April 7	"Pa Mi"	Dalex and Rafa Pabön	3	May 19	12	
April 7	"HP"	Maluma	6	May 19	12	
April 21	"Tumbando el Club (Remix)" (Note: The single re-entered the top ten on the week ending June 16, 2019.) ◁	Neo Pistea featuring C.R.O., Obiewanshot, Ysy A, Cazzu, Khea, Lucho SSJ, Coqeéin Montana, Marcianos Crew and Duki	3	April 21	9	
April 21	"Tal Vez" (#9) (Note: The single re-entered the top ten on the week ending August 18, 2019.) ◁	Paulo Londra	2	May 26	17	
April 21	"Desconocidos"	Mau y Ricky, Manuel Turizo and Camilo	10	April 21	1	
April 28	"Te Robaré" (Note: The single re-entered the top ten on the week ending June 9, 2019.)	Nicky Jam and Ozuna	7	June 30	7	
May 5	"Con Altura" (#6) (Note: The single re-entered the top ten on the week ending January 12, 2020.)	Rosalía and J Balvin featuring El Guincho	1	July 21	32	
May 19	"Otro Trago" (#1) (Note: The single re-entered the top ten on the week ending December 15, 2019.)	Sech, Ozuna and Anuel AA featuring Darell and Nicky Jam (Note: Ozuna, Anuel AA and Nicky Jam started being credited as artists from the week ending August 11, 2019.)	1	June 2	29	
May 26	"La Cobra"	J Mena	3	June 2	3	
June 2	"Soltera (Remix)" (#10) (Note: The single re-entered the top ten on the week ending November 3, 2019.) (Note: The single re-entered the top ten on the week ending January 26, 2020.)	Lunay, Daddy Yankee and Bad Bunny	3	July 28	33	
June 30	"No Me Conoce (Remix)"	Jhay Cortez, J Balvin and Bad Bunny	4	August 11	22	
June 30	"11 PM"	Maluma	6	August 4	15	
June 30	"22" (Note: The single re-entered the top ten on the week ending August 11, 2019.) (Note: The single re-entered the top ten on the week ending September 15, 2019.)	Tini and Greeicy	8	July 28	9	
July 21	"Señorita" (Note: The single re-entered the top ten on the week ending August 25, 2019.)	Shawn Mendes and Camila Cabello	7	September 15	9	
August 4	"China" (Note: The single re-entered the top ten on the week ending March 22, 2020.) (#5) ◁	Anuel AA, Karol G and Daddy Yankee featuring Ozuna and J Balvin	1	September 22	35	
August 4	"Callaíta"	Bad Bunny and Tainy	9	August 4	2	
September 1	"Nicki Nicole: Bzrp Music Sessions, Vol. 13"	Nicki Nicole and Bizarrap	3	September 1	2	
September 22	"Tutu" (#7)	Camilo and Pedro Capó	1	October 27	22	
September 29	"Goteo" (Note: The single re-entered the top ten on the week ending October 20, 2019.)	Duki	10	September 29	4	
October 6	"Adicto"	Tainy, Anuel AA and Ozuna	5	October 13	5	
October 13	"Fresa"	Tini and Lalo Ebratt	3	November 3	15	
October 27	"Oye" ◁	Tini and Sebastián Yatra	3	October 27	4	
November 10	"Que Tire Pa Lante" (#4)	Daddy Yankee	1	November 17	33	
November 17	"La Boca"	Mau y Ricky and Camilo	6	November 17	1	
November 24	"Ritmo (Bad Boys for Life)" (Note: The single re-entered the top ten on the week ending May 10, 2020.) (Note: The single re-entered the top ten on the week ending May 24, 2020.)	The Black Eyed Peas and J Balvin	2	December 1	27	
December 1	"Fantasías" (Note: The single re-entered the top ten on the week ending June 21, 2020.)	Rauw Alejandro and Farruko	2	December 8	29	
December 8	"Bellaquita"	Dalex featuring Lenny Tavárez	4	December 15	17	

=== 2018 peaks ===
List of Billboard Hot 100 top ten singles in 2019 that peaked in 2018
Top ten entry date	Single	Artist(s)	Peak	Peak date	Weeks in top ten	Ref.
October 13	"Cuando Te Besé" ◁	Becky G and Paulo Londra	1	October 13	13	
October 13	"No Me Acuerdo" (Note: The single re-entered the top ten on the week ending February 24, 2019.) (Note: The single re-entered the top ten on the week ending March 31, 2019.) ◁	Thalía and Natti Natasha	3	October 13	15	
October 13	"Ya No Tiene Novio" ◁	Sebastián Yatra and Mau y Ricky	2	November 17	16	
October 27	"Taki Taki"	DJ Snake featuring Selena Gomez, Ozuna and Cardi B	1	November 3	21	
November 3	"Mia"	Bad Bunny featuring Drake	3	November 24	22	
November 24	"Adán y Eva" (#8)	Paulo Londra	1	December 9	24	

=== 2020 peaks ===
List of Billboard Hot 100 top ten singles in 2019 that peaked in 2020
Top ten entry date	Single	Artist(s)	Peak	Peak date	Weeks in top ten	Ref.
December 22	"Tusa"	Karol G and Nicki Minaj	1	January 19	38	

== See also ==
- List of Billboard Argentina Hot 100 number-one singles of 2019

== Notes ==
Notes for re-entries
