= Duki: Bzrp Music Sessions, Vol. 50 =

Single by Bizarrap and Duki
- Language: Spanish
- Released: November 16, 2022
- Recorded: 2022
- Studio: BZRP Studio (Argentina)
- Genre: Latin trap
- Length: 3:41
- Label: Dale Play
- Lyricist: Mauro Ezequiel Lombardo
- Producer: Bizarrap

Bizarrap singles chronology
"Quevedo: Bzrp Music Sessions, Vol. 52" (2022)	"Duki: Bzrp Music Sessions, Vol. 50" (2022)	"3 Estrellas en el Conjunto" (2022)

Duki singles chronology
"I Dance" (2022)	"Duki: Bzrp Music Sessions, Vol. 50" (2022)	"Marisola" (remix) (2022)

Music video
- "Duki: Bzrp Music Sessions, Vol. 50" on YouTube

"Duki: Bzrp Music Sessions, Vol. 50" is a song by the Argentine producer Bizarrap and the Argentine rapper Duki, belonging to the former's BZRP Music Sessions. It was released on November 16, 2022, through Dale Play Records.

== Background ==
On several occasions, Duki had rejected the idea of recording a BZRP Music Sessions. However, he gave hope to his fans on July 10, 2022, by posting a story on Instagram, through which he said: "If Argentina wins the Copa América we do the session with Bizarrap. Short". After the triumph of the Argentine soccer team in the 2021 Copa América, the rapper declared via Twitter: "I am a man of my word, I am going to do my session with Bizarrap. A sharau for the Argentine team. Thanks for the gift".

In October 2022, he assured during a concert that "the session will come out before the World Cup, as we promised", while for Molusco TV he confirmed that they were already working on the issue. On November 14 of that same year, Bizarrap released a preview of session number 50 in collaboration with Spotify, without specifying the interpreter, for which the voices of Ibai Llanos, Coscu and Luisito Comunica were provided. The next day, the producer finally confirmed that Duki would perform said session and announced the release date.

== Music video ==
The music video was released simultaneously with the song, which managed to be number one in trends in the music section of YouTube. At the end of the video there is a black screen and angel wings shining with a phrase above that reads Part 1, while on the right you can see bat wings; both drawings represent the tattoos that Duki has on his cheeks.

== Credits ==
Credits adapted from Genius.

- Bizarrap (producer and author)
- Duki (voice and authorship)
- Santiago Alvarado (authorship)
- Miguel Correa (voice engineer)
- Zecca (mixing and mastering engineer)
- Orquesta Sinfónica Juvenil Nacional José de San Martín (symphonic Orchestra)
- YSY A (additional voice)

== Charts ==
Weekly chart performance for "Duki: Bzrp Music Sessions, Vol. 50"
Chart (2022)	Peak position
Argentina Hot 100 (Billboard)	1
Bolivia (Monitor Latino)	15
Bolivia (Billboard)	5
Chile (Billboard)	10
Colombia (Billboard)	23
Ecuador (Billboard)	18
Global 200 (Billboard)	33
Mexico (Billboard)	24
Paraguay (SGP)	13
Peru (Billboard)	8
Spain (PROMUSICAE)	1

== Certifications ==
Certifications for "Duki: Bzrp Music Sessions, Vol. 50"
Region	Certification	Certified units/sales
Spain (Promusicae)	2× Platinum	120,000^{‡}
^{‡} Sales+streaming figures based on certification alone.
