= La Jeepeta =

Single by Nio García, Brray and Juanka

from the album Now or Never
- Language: Spanish
- Released: January 1, 2020 (original); April 24, 2020 (remix)
- Genre: Reggaeton
- Length: 3:24 (original); 5:45 (remix)
- Label: Flow La Movie
- Songwriters: Antonio García; Emmanuel Gazmey; Michael Torres; Bryan García; Juan Bauza
- Producer: Xound

Nio García singles chronology
"Bellaquear" (2019)	"La Jeepeta" (2020)	"Nadie Lo Sabe (remix)" (2020)

Anuel AA singles chronology
"No Me Ame" (2020)	"La Jeepeta (remix)" (2020)	"Don Don" (2020)

Myke Towers singles chronology
"Ponte Pa' Mi" (2020)	"La Jeepeta (remix)" (2020)	"Michael Myers" (2020)

Brray singles chronology
"De Donde Vengo" (2019)	"La Jeepeta" (2019)	"Dime Bebé" (2019)

Juanka singles chronology
"Por Mi Familia" (2019)	"La Jeepeta" (2020)	"Mi 10" (2020)

Music video
- "La Jeepeta (remix)" on YouTube

"La Jeepeta" is a song by Puerto Rican rappers Nio García, Brray and Juanka. It was released for digital download and streaming as a single by Flow La Movie on January 1, 2020. It was written by Antonio García, Bryan García and Juan Bauza and produced by Xound. A remix version for the song with Puerto Rican rappers Anuel AA and Myke Towers was released on April 24, 2020, as the third single from Nio García and Casper Mágico's collaborative album Now or Never. The remix version for the song entered the Billboard Hot 100 at number 93, which was Myke Towers, Brray and Juanka's first entry on the chart. It also landed up at the top of the charts in Spain and Argentina.

== Composition ==
Billboard describes lyrics of "La Jeepeta" as "explicit and raunchy." Regarding the lyrics, Nio Garcia said in an interview for Billboard: "When I presented this idea to my company, Flow La Movie, they asked me if I was sure that I wanted to release it. With all the confidence in me, they invested in the project and the rest is history".

In the remix version, Anuel AA makes reference to Nicky Jam and Daddy Yankee's song "En la Cama" in the final of his verse. He also mentioned Puerto Rican singer Ozuna hinting to the controversial incident, which included an explicit video with the participation of Ozuna.

== Commercial performance ==
The remix version for "La Jeepeta" debuted at number 21 on the Billboard Bubbling Under Hot 100 chart dated July 18, 2020. It reached a new peak at number five on the chart before entering the Billboard Hot 100 at number 93 on August 22, 2020. "La Jeepeta" (remix) debuted at number 41 on the Billboard Hot Latin Songs chart on the issue dated May 9, 2020. The song peaked at number three on the chart on August 22, 2020. On the Billboard Global 200, it debuted and peaked at number 29 on September 19, 2020. The song also peaked at number 8 on the Billboard Latin Rhythm Airplay and the Billboard Latin Airplay charts dated October 10, 2020.

"La Jeepeta" (remix) reached the top of the Billboard Argentina Hot 100, Spain's PROMUSICAE chart and Colombia's Monitor Latino chart. The song also entered and peaked on the Monitor Latino charts in Costa Rica (7), Dominican Republic (2), El Salvador (8), Guatemala (7), Honduras (4), Paraguay (9), Peru (4) and Puerto Rico (3).

== Music video ==
A music video was released for both the original song, on January 1, 2020, and for the remix, the latter, on April 24, 2020. Both music videos are available on Flow La Movie's YouTube channel.

== Charts ==
=== Weekly charts ===
Weekly chart performance for "La Jeepeta (Remix)"
Chart (2020)	Peak position
Argentina Hot 100 (Billboard)	1
Costa Rica (Monitor Latino)	7
Dominican Republic (Monitor Latino)	2
El Salvador (Monitor Latino)	8
Guatemala (Monitor Latino)	7
Honduras (Monitor Latino)	4
Paraguay (Monitor Latino)	9
Peru (Monitor Latino)	4
Puerto Rico (Monitor Latino)	3
Spain (Promusicae)	1
US Latin Airplay (Billboard)	8
US Latin Pop Airplay (Billboard)	31
US Latin Rhythm Airplay (Billboard)	8
US Hot Latin Songs (Billboard)	3
US Latin Digital Song Sales (Billboard)	5

=== Year-end charts ===
2020 year-end chart performance for "La Jeepeta (Remix)"
Chart (2020)	Position
Costa Rica (Monitor Latino)	51
Colombia (Monitor Latino)	13
Dominican Republic (Monitor Latino)	28
El Salvador (ASAP EGC)	10
Guatemala (Monitor Latino)	66
Honduras (Monitor Latino)	16
Latin America (Monitor Latino)	28
Nicaragua (Monitor Latino)	30
Paraguay (Monitor Latino)	46
Peru (Monitor Latino)	38
Puerto Rico (Monitor Latino)	2
Spain (PROMUSICAE)	3
United States (Monitor Latino)	43

2021 year-end chart performance for "La Jeepeta (Remix)"
Chart (2021)	Position
Honduras (Monitor Latino)	64
Guatemala (Monitor Latino)	66
Nicaragua (Monitor Latino)	45
Peru (Monitor Latino)	52

== Certifications ==
Certifications and sales for "La Jeepeta"
Region	Certification	Certified units/sales
Spain (Promusicae) Remix version	4× Platinum	160,000^{‡}
United States (RIAA)	3× Platinum (Latin)	180,000^{‡}
United States (RIAA) Remix version	16× Platinum (Latin)	960,000^{‡}
^{‡} Sales+streaming figures based on certification alone.
