= Argentina Hot 100 =

Argentine music chart

The Billboard Argentina Hot 100 is the music industry standard record chart in Argentina for songs, published weekly by Billboard and Billboard Argentina magazines. It ranks the most popular songs in Argentina and is compiled by utilizing a formula blending local streaming activity on leading music services such as YouTube, Spotify and Apple Music, among others, as well as national radio airplay and plays of songs featured on a variety of Argentine TV networks. Streaming data is provided by Luminate, while radio and TV measurement is powered by BMAT/Vericast.

The charted debuted on 13 October 2018 with the first number one song of the chart being "Cuando Te Besé" by Becky G and Paulo Londra. As of the issue for the week ending on 29 March 2025, the Billboard Argentina Hot 100 has had sixty-three different number one entries. The song that holds the record for the longest-running number-one single is "Tusa" by Karol G and Nicki Minaj, with 25 weeks. The current number-one song on the chart is "Amor de Vago" by La T y La M featuring Malandro.

== Number-one singles ==
- 2018
- 2019
- 2020
- 2021
- 2022
- 2023
- 2024
- 2025

== Top-ten singles ==
- 2018
- 2019
- 2020
- 2021
- 2022
- 2023
- 2024

== Milestones ==
=== Most weeks at number one on the Billboard Argentina Hot 100 ===
Number of weeks	Artist(s)	Song	Year(s)	Ref.
25	Karol G and Nicki Minaj	"Tusa"	2020	
16	Tiago PZK, Lit Killah, María Becerra and Nicki Nicole (Note: 16 non-consecutive weeks: 7 weeks original; 9 weeks remix.)	"Entre Nosotros"	2021; 2022	
16	Karol G	"Si Antes Te Hubiera Conocido"	2024; 2025	
15	Manuel Turizo	"La Bachata" (Note: Non-consecutive weeks.)	2022; 2023	
13	Sech, Ozuna and Anuel AA featuring Darell and Nicky Jam	"Otro Trago" (Note: 13 non.consecutive weeks: 7 weeks original; 6 weeks remix.)	2019	
12	Maluma and The Weeknd	"Hawái" (Note: 12 non-consecutive weeks: 9 weeks original; 3 weeks remix.)	2020	
11	Valentino Merlo and The La Planta	"Hoy"	2024	
11	La T y La M featuring Malandro	"Amor de Vago"	2025	
10	Daddy Yankee and Katy Perry featuring Snow	"Con Calma"	2019	
10	Mesita, Nicki Nicole and Tiago PZK featuring Emilia	"Una Foto (Remix)"	2024	

=== Most total weeks in the top ten ===
Number of weeks	Artist(s)	Song	Year(s)	Ref.
41	Daddy Yankee and Katy Perry featuring Snow	"Con Calma"	2019	
41	Pedro Capó, Alicia Keys and Farruko	"Calma (Remix)"	2019	
38	Karol G and Nicki Minaj	"Tusa"	2019; 2020	
37	Tiago PZK, Lit Killah, María Becerra and Nicki Nicole	"Entre Nosotros (Remix)"	2021; 2022	
35	Anuel AA, Daddy Yankee and Karol G featuring Ozuna and J Balvin	"China"	2019; 2020	
33	Lunay, Daddy Yankee and Bad Bunny	"Soltera (Remix)"	2019; 2020	
33	Daddy Yankee	"Que Tire Pa Lante"	2019; 2020	
32	Rosalía and J Balvin featuring El Guincho	"Con Altura"	2019; 2020	
29	Sech, Ozuna and Anuel AA featuring Darell and Nicky Jam	"Otro Trago"	2019	
29	Rauw Alejandro and Farruko	"Fantasías"	2019; 2020	
29	Rauw Alejandro and Camilo	"Tattoo (Remix)"	2019; 2020	
29	Maluma and The Weeknd	"Hawái"	2020; 2021	
29	Bizarrap and Quevedo	"Quevedo: Bzrp Music Sessions, Vol. 52"	2022; 2023	
29	Manuel Turizo	"La Bachata"	2022; 2023	

=== Most total weeks on the Argentina Hot 100 ===
Number of weeks	Artist(s)	Song	Year(s)	Ref.
142	Los Ángeles Azules and Nicki Nicole	"Otra Noche"	2021; 2022; 2023; 2024; 2025	
131	La Delio Valdez	"Inocente"	2021; 2022; 2023; 2024	
128	Manuel Turizo	"La Bachata"	2022; 2023; 2024	
125	No Te Va Gustar	"A Las Nueve"	2022; 2023; 2024; 2025	
125	Luck Ra, La K'onga and Ke Personajes	"Ya No Vuelvas"	2022; 2023; 2024; 2025	
113	Pedro Capó, Alicia Keys and Farruko	"Calma (Remix)"	2018; 2019; 2020; 2021	
111	Tiago PZK, Lit Killah, María Becerra and Nicki Nicole	"Entre Nosotros (Remix)"	2021; 2022; 2023; 2024	
108	The Weeknd and Ariana Grande	"Save Your Tears"	2021; 2022; 2023; 2024	
104	Ke Personajes featuring Onda Sabanera	"Pobre Corazón"	2023; 2024; 2025	
101	Big One, FMK and Ke Personajes	"Un Finde"	2023; 2024; 2025	

=== Biggest jump to number one ===
Chart movement	Artist(s)	Song	Date	Source
75–1	Tini and María Becerra	"Miénteme"	16 May 2021	
53–1	Tini	"La Triple T"	22 May 2022	
45–1	Bizarrap and Quevedo	"Quevedo: Bzrp Music Sessions, Vol. 52"	24 July 2022	
35–1	Bizarrap and Milo J	"Milo J: Bzrp Music Sessions, Vol. 57"	22 October 2023	
30–1	Mesita, Tiago PZK and Nicki Nicole featuring Emilia	"Una Foto"	21 January 2024	
19–1	Tiago PZK, Lit Killah, María Becerra and Nicki Nicole	"Entre Nosotros"	16 January 2022	
14–1	Bizarrap and L-Gante	"L-Gante: Bzrp Music Sessions, Vol. 38"	28 March 2021	
11–1	Bizarrap and Duki	"Duki: Bzrp Music Sessions, Vol. 50"	4 December 2022	
10–1	Maluma	"Hawái"	6 September 2020	
9–1	Rosalía and Yahritza y Su Esencia	"La Perla"	13 September 2025	
8–1	Bhavi, Seven Kayne and Milo J featuring Tiago PZK, Khea and Neo Pistea	"Bésame (Remix)"	5 May 2024	

=== Longest climbs to number one ===
Week	Artist(s)	Song	Debut date	Date reaching number one	Source(s)
21	Rauw Alejandro and Camilo	"Tattoo (Remix)"	March 15, 2020	August 2, 2020	
19	BM, Callejero Fino and La Joaqui featuring Lola Índigo	"M.A (Remix)"	December 18, 2022	April 23, 2023	
17	Mesita, Tiago PZK and Nicki Nicole featuring Emilia	"Una Foto (Remix)"	September 24, 2024	January 21, 2024	
17	La T y La M featuring Malandro	"Amor de Vago"	September 22, 2024	January 12, 2025	
14	Rosalía and J Balvin featuring El Guincho	"Con Altura"	April 21, 2019	July 13, 2019	
12	Manuel Turizo	"La Bachata"	June 26, 2022	September 18, 2022	
12	Karol G	"Si Antes Te Hubiera Conocido"	June 7, 2024	September 22, 2024	
11	Luck Ra, La K'onga and Ke Personajes	"Ya No Vuelvas"	December 18, 2022	February 26, 2023	
10	Camilo and Pedro Capó	"Tutu"	August 25, 2019	October 19, 2019	
10	Nio García, Anuel AA and Myke Towers featuring Juanka and Brray	"La Jeepeta (Remix)"	May 10, 2020	July 12, 2020	
10	La K'onga and Nahuel Pennisi	"Universo Paralelo"	January 23, 2022	March 19, 2022	
10	Luck Ra and BM	"La Morocha"	July 23, 2023	September 24, 2023	

=== Biggest single-week upward movements ===
No. of positions	Chart movement	Artist(s)	Song	Date	Source
85	89–4	Bizarrap and Nathy Peluso	"Nathy Peluso: Bzrp Music Sessions, Vol. 36"	December 13, 2020	
83	86–3	Khea and Duki	"Wacha"	April 18, 2021	
82	100–18	Trueno	"Real Gangsta Love"	June 16, 2024	
80	90–10	Tini featuring John C	"Duele"	October 11, 2020	
77	79–2	Residente	"René"	March 15, 2020	
77	93–16	Paulo Londra featuring De La Ghetto and Justin Quiles	"Solo Pienso en Ti"	June 2, 2019	
74	75–1	Tini and María Becerra	"Miénteme"	May 16, 2021	
74	91–17	Luck Ra and Rusherking	"Te Mentiría (Remix)"	May 15, 2022	
74	92–18	Emilia	"Cuatro Veinte"	April 10, 2022	
73	91–18	Mau y Ricky and María Becerra	"Mal Acostumbrao"	September 19, 2021	
73	92–19	Luck Ra, Khea and Maluma	"Hola Perdida (Remix)"	September 15, 2024	

=== Biggest single-week downward movements ===
No. of positions	Chart movement	Artist(s)	Song	Date	Source
77	15–92	Luck Ra, Khea and Maluma	"Hola Perdida (Remix)"	September 8, 2024	
73	27–100	Rvssian, Rauw Alejandro and Ayra Starr	"Santa"	September 8, 2024	
71	24–95	Eugenia Quevedo and La Banda de Carlitos	"No Podrás (En Vivo)"	September 15, 2024	
69	28–97	Rauw Alejandro and Farruko	"Fantasías"	September 27, 2020	
62	37–99	Tini	"Ángel"	May 5, 2024	
61	32–93	Ke Personajes and Onda Sabanera	"Pobre Corazón"	September 15, 2024	
60	36–96	Rodrigo	"La Mano de Dios"	December 20, 2020	
58	38–96	María Becerra, Chencho Corleone and Ovy on the Drums	"Piscina"	September 15, 2024	
57	36–93	Justin Quiles, Daddy Yankee and El Alfa	"PAM"	September 27, 2020	
56	43–99	Emanero, La K'onga and Antonio Ríos	"Adicto"	November 17, 2024	

=== Biggest drops off the Billboard Argentina Hot 100 ===
Chart movement	Artist(s)	Song	Date	Source
3–Off	Tiago PZK and Ke Personajes	"Piel"	April 21, 2024	
10–Off	Rich Music, Dalex and Sech featuring Justin Quiles, Lenny Tavárez, Feid and Mariah	"Feel Me"	September 27, 2020	
13–Off	El Alfa	"4K"	September 27, 2020	
15–Off	Ir-Sais and Rauw Alejandro	"Dream Girl (Remix)"	September 27, 2020	
22–Off	Chyno Miranda and J Balvin	"El Peor"	December 9, 2018	
28–Off	FloyyMenor and Lewis Somes	"Apaga el Cel" (Note: "Apaga el Cel" re-entered the chart at number 54 the following week.)	September 8, 2024	
29–Off	Eugenia Quevedo and La Banda de Carlitos	"Perdonarte Para Qué? (En Vivo)"	September 15, 2024	
30–Off	Brytiago featuring Darell	"Asesina" (Note: "Asesina" re-entered the chart at number 25 the following week.)	November 3, 2018	
32–Off	FMK, María Becerra and Beret	"AYNEA (Remix)"	April 4, 2021	
33–Off	Luciano Pereyra	"Como Tú"	October 20, 2018	
33–Off	No Te Va Gustar	"A Las Nueve" (Note: "A Las Nueve" re-entered the chart at number 27 the following week.)	September 8, 2024	

=== Most number-one singles ===
Number of singles	Artist	Number-one songs	Ref.
9	Bizarrap	"Mamichula"; "L-Gante: Bzrp Music Sessions, Vol. 38"; "Nicky Jam: Bzrp Music Sessions, Vol. 41"; "Residente: Bzrp Music Sessions, Vol. 49"; "Paulo Londra: Bzrp Music Sessions, Vol. 23"; "Quevedo: Bzrp Music Sessions, Vol. 52"; "Duki: Bzrp Music Sessions, Vol. 50"; "Shakira: Bzrp Music Sessions, Vol. 53"; "Milo J: Bzrp Music Sessions, Vol. 57"	
7	Tiago PZK	"Además de Mí (Remix)"; "No Me Conocen (Remix)"; "Entre Nosotros"; "Salimo de Noche"; "Los del Espacio"; "Una Foto (Remix)"; "Bésame (Remix)"	
7	María Becerra	"Además de Mí (Remix)"; "Miénteme"; "Qué Más Pues?"; "Entre Nosotros (Remix)"; "Los del Espacio"; "Corazón Vacio"; "Ramen Para Dos"	
6	Nicki Nicole	"Mamichula"; "Entre Nosotros (Remix)"; "Marisola (Remix)"; "Una Foto (Remix)"; "Ojos Verdes"; "Blackout"	
6	Tini	"Miénteme"; "Bar"; "La Triple T"; "La Original"; "Pa"; "Blackout"	
5	Duki	"Además de Mí (Remix)"; "No Me Conocen (Remix)"; "Duki: Bzrp Music Sessions, Vol. 50"; "Marisola (Remix)"; "Los del Espacio"	
5	Emilia	"En La Intimidad"; "Los del Espacio"; "La Original"; "Una Foto (Remix)"; "Blackout"	
5	Paulo Londra	"Cuando Te Besé"; "Adán y Eva"; "Plan A"; "Paulo Londra: Bzrp Music Sessions, Vol. 23"; "Ramen Para Dos"	
4	Karol G	"China"; "Tusa"; "Bichota"; "Si Antes Te Hubiera Conocido"	
3	Ozuna	"Taki Taki"; "Otro Trago (Remix)"; "China"	
3	Daddy Yankee	"Con Calma"; "China"; "Que Tire Pa Lante"	
3	Anuel AA	"Otro Trago (Remix)"; "China"; "La Jeepeta (Remix)"	
3	Camilo	"Tutu"; "Tattoo (Remix)"; "Vida de Rico"	
3	J Balvin	"Con Altura"; "China"; "Qué Más Pues?"	
3	Rauw Alejandro	"Tattoo (Remix)"; "Todo de Ti"; "Te Felicito"	
3	Lit Killah	"Además de Mí (Remix)"; "Entre Nosotros"; "Los del Espacio"	
3	Big One	"En La Intimidad"; "Un Finde"; "Los del Espacio"	
3	Myke Towers	"La Jeepeta (Remix)"; "Bandido"; "Lala"	
3	Khea	"Además de Mí (Remix)"; "Hola Perdida"; "Bésame (Remix)"	

=== Most cumulative weeks at number one ===
Number of weeks	Artist
49	Karol G
38	Tiago PZK
31	Emilia
29	Bizarrap
26	María Becerra
26	Tini
25	Nicki Minaj
25	Nicki Nicole
24	Daddy Yankee
24	Lit Killah

=== Most Billboard Argentina Hot 100 entries ===
Entries	Artist	Ref.
95	Duki	
90	Bad Bunny	
61	Bizarrap	
58	María Becerra	
49	J Balvin	
47	Rauw Alejandro	
47	Tini	
43	Anuel AA	
42	Nicki Nicole	
41	Maluma	
