= Los del Espacio =

2023 single by Los del Espacio

Single by Lit Killah, Tiago PZK, María Becerra, Duki, Emilia, Rusherking, Big One and FMK
- Released: June 1, 2023
- Genre: Urban; reggaeton
- Length: 5:38
- Label: Warner Latina
- Songwriters: Daniel Ismael Real; Enzo Ezequiel Sauthier; María Emilia Mernes; María de los Ángeles Becerra; Mauro Lombardo; Mauro Román Monzón; Thomas Nicolás Tobar; Tiago Uriel Pacheco Lezcano
- Producer: Big One

Lit Killah singles chronology
| "Neón" (2023) | "Los del Espacio" (2023) | "Aeróbico" (remix) (2023) |

Tiago PZK singles chronology
| "Me Enteré" (2023) | "Los del Espacio" (2023) | "Como Yo :(" (2023) |

María Becerra singles chronology
| "Te Cura" (2023) | "Los del Espacio" (2023) | "Corazón Vacío" (2023) |

Duki singles chronology
| "Apollo 13" (2023) | "Los del Espacio" (2023) | "Rockstar 2.0" (2023) |

Emilia singles chronology
| "No Se Ve" (2023) | "Los del Espacio" (2023) | "Nagasaki" (2023) |

Rusherking singles chronology
| "Hipnotizados" (2023) | "Los del Espacio" (2023) | "Intensidad" (2023) |

Big One singles chronology
| "Un Finde" (2023) | "Los del Espacio" (2023) | "Mentiras" (2023) |

FMK singles chronology
| "Poka Luz (Remix)" (2023) | "Los del Espacio" (2023) | "Salgo a Bailar" (2023) |

Music video
- "Los del Espacio" on YouTube

"Los del Espacio" is a song recorded by the supergroup of the same name, formed by Argentine singers Lit Killah, Tiago PZK, María Becerra, Duki, Emilia, Rusherking, FMK, and producer Big One. It was released as a single through Warner Music Latina on June 1, 2023.

The song succeeded commercially, reaching the top 20 in seven countries, including Argentina, where it topped the Billboard Argentina Hot 100.

== Background ==
The Los del Espacio group was formed in quarantine due to the COVID-19 pandemic in 2020, when Lit Killah strengthened his friendship with Tiago PZK, FMK, and Rusherking. They moved in together and began to compose music. Their first song was "Además de Mí (Remix)", performed by Rushering, PZK, Killah, Duki and María Becerra, which topped the Billboard Argentina Hot 100 and charted on the Billboard Global 200 at position 98.

At the end of May 2023, the singers began hinting at a possible collaboration on their social networks, but separately. María Becerra and Duki announced that they would release a song on June 30, followed by Rusherking and Tiago PZK on the same date, and finally, another announcement between Lit Killah and Emilia. They interacted on their respective accounts as part of a plan by the group to "mislead the fans", according to Lit Killah: "I think people didn't even expect it when we were announcing it, and that's why we also came up with the posts that I did with Emilia, and Duki with Maria, so that people don't guess what all of us were talking about." Finally, the song was announced on May 30.

== Composition ==
"Los del Espacio" is five minutes and 38 seconds long. It was composed by all the members of the supergroup and produced and mastered solely by Big One. It was described as an "uptempo reggaeton perfect for summer."

Lucas Terrazas for Argentine newspaper Infobae said that the song "reflects the current phenomenon of the urban scene where synergy and collaborations propel artists to new levels." The group also sought to create a "future impact" where "other generations also collaborate in the same way," Killah explained in an interview.

== Critical reception ==
The song was chosen by Laura Coca for Los 40 as one of the ten "super collaborations of urban music that made history". It was described as "the collaboration of the year" and "a landmark song".

== Commercial performance ==
In their native country, Argentina, "Los del Espacio" debuted directly at number one on the Billboard Argentina Hot 100, being the fifth number one on the chart for María Becerra, Duki and Tiago PZK, and continued at its peak for three consecutive weeks. Globally, the song reached the top 40 on the Billboard Global 200, and the top 20 on its parallel Billboard Global Excl. US. It also topped the Uruguayan, Paraguayan, and Argentinian Airplay chart. Elsewhere, "Los del Espacio" peaked at number two in Chile, number four in Spain, number five in Bolivia, number six in Peru, and number 22 in Ecuador. It received a Gold certification in Spain by the Productores de Música de España after selling 30,000 copies in the country.

On the streaming platform Spotify, the song managed to break into the Top 50 most streamed songs daily, and made many of the singers receive their best day of streaming on the platform to date.

== Charts ==
| Chart (2023) | Peak position |
|---|---|
| Argentina Hot 100 (Billboard) | 1 |
| Argentina Airplay (Monitor Latino) | 1 |
| Bolivia (Billboard) | 5 |
| Chile (Billboard) | 2 |
| Ecuador (Billboard) | 22 |
| Global 200 (Billboard) | 38 |
| Paraguay (SPG) | 2 |
| Paraguay Airplay (Monitor Latino) | 1 |
| Peru (Billboard) | 6 |
| Spain (PROMUSICAE) | 3 |
| Uruguay (CUD) | 1 |
| Uruguay Airplay (Monitor Latino) | 1 |

== Certifications ==
Certifications for "Los del Espacio"
| Region | Certification | Certified units/sales |
|---|---|---|
| Argentina (CAPIF) | 2× Platinum | 40,000^{‡} |
| Spain (PROMUSICAE) | 6× Platinum | 360,000^{‡} |
^{‡} Sales+streaming figures based on certification alone.
