= Calma (song) =

2018 single by Puerto Rican singer Pedro Capó

Single by Pedro Capó

from the album Munay
- Released: July 20, 2018
- Recorded: 2018
- Genre: Latin pop
- Length: 3:00
- Label: Sony Latin
- Songwriters: Pedro Capó; George Noriega; Gabriel Edgar Gonzalez Perez
- Producers: Rec808; George Noriega

Pedro Capó singles chronology
"Las Luces" (2018)	"Calma" (2018)	"Te Olvidaré" (2019)

Music video
- "Calma" on YouTube

"Calma (Remix)"

Single by Pedro Capó and Farruko

from the album Gangalee
- Released: October 5, 2018
- Recorded: 2018
- Genre: Latin pop; reggaeton
- Length: 3:59
- Label: Sony Latin
- Songwriters: Pedro Capó; Carlos Efrén Reyes Rosado; George Noriega; Gabriel Edgar Gonzalez Perez; Franklin Jovani Martínez; Sharo Towers
- Producers: Rec808; George Noriega; Sharo Towers

Farruko singles chronology
"Falsas Promesas (Remix)" (2019)	"Calma (Remix)" (2018)	"Inolvidable (Remix)" (2020)

Music video
- "Calma – Remix" on YouTube

"Calma (Alicia Remix)"

Single by Pedro Capó, Alicia Keys and Farruko

from the album Gangalee
- Released: April 19, 2019
- Recorded: 2019
- Genre: Latin pop
- Label: Sony Music US Latin
- Songwriters: Pedro Capó; Carlos Efrén Reyes Rosado; George Noriega; Gabriel Edgar Gonzalez Perez; Franklin Jovani Martínez; Sharo Towers; Alicia Keys

Alicia Keys singles chronology
"Us" (2018)	"Calma (Alicia Remix)" (2019)	"Show Me Love" (2019)

Music video
- "Calma – Alicia Remix" on YouTube

"Calma" (Calm) is a single by Puerto Rican singer Pedro Capó. The song was co-written by Capó, George Noriega and Gabriel Edgar Gonzalez Perez.

A remix version featuring Farruko was released on October 5, 2018. The remix video has received over 3.1 billion views on YouTube. Since its release, the song has become a huge success, topping the charts of Argentina, Bolivia, Chile, Colombia, Costa Rica, the Dominican Republic, El Salvador, Guatemala, Italy, Mexico, Panama, Paraguay, Peru, Uruguay and Venezuela. The song also received a Latin double-platinum certification by the Recording Industry Association of America (RIAA) for units of over 120,000 sales plus track-equivalent streams.

Following its success, a remix version featuring Alicia Keys was released on April 19, 2019. Finally, a Future bounce remix by Alan Walker of the Farruko remix was released on June 21, 2019, by Sony Music Entertainment.

On July 18, 2019, Capó and Farruko performed an exclusive version of the song with Lali at the 2019 Premios Juventud. Suzette Fernandez of Billboard highlighted the performance as one of the six best of the night, saying that it "was the perfect fit for the show, because it brought the summer vibes that the awards are known for."

The original version of the song won Song of the Year at the 20th Annual Latin Grammy Awards, while the remix version featuring Farruko won Best Urban Fusion/Performance in the same year.

== Cover versions ==
Serbian singer Milja Smiljkovic covered the song at Knez Mihailova together with her younger sister.

== Charts ==
=== Original version ===
Chart (2018–19)	Peak position
Argentina Airplay (Monitor Latino)	1
Bolivia (Monitor Latino)	1
Chile (Monitor Latino)	1
Colombia (Monitor Latino)	1
Colombia (National-Report)	1
Costa Rica (Monitor Latino)	1
Dominican Republic (Monitor Latino)	1
Ecuador (Monitor Latino)	2
Ecuador (National-Report)	3
El Salvador (Monitor Latino)	1
France (SNEP)	11
Germany (GfK)	33
Guatemala (Monitor Latino)	1
Honduras (Monitor Latino)	3
Mexico (Monitor Latino)	3
Nicaragua (Monitor Latino)	2
Panama (Monitor Latino)	1
Paraguay (Monitor Latino)	1
Peru (Monitor Latino)	1
Puerto Rican Singles Chart	1
Portugal (AFP)	13
Slovenia (SloTop50)	2
Switzerland (Schweizer Hitparade)	2
Uruguay (Monitor Latino)	1
Venezuela (Monitor Latino)	2
Venezuela (National-Report)	2

=== Remix version ===
Chart (2018–19) (Note: Monitor Latino chart peaks measure combined data between the original and the Farruko remix version starting from the week of February 11, 2019.)	Peak position
Argentina (Argentina Hot 100)	1
Argentina Airplay (Monitor Latino)	1
Austria (Ö3 Austria Top 40)	8
Belgium (Ultratop 50 Flanders)	34
Belgium (Ultratop 50 Wallonia)	4
Bolivia (Monitor Latino)	2
Brazil (Top 100 Brasil)	4
Bulgaria (PROPHON)	1
CIS Airplay (TopHit)	31
Chile (Monitor Latino)	1
Colombia (Monitor Latino)	1
Costa Rica (Monitor Latino)	1
Dominican Republic (Monitor Latino)	3
Ecuador (Monitor Latino)	2
El Salvador (Monitor Latino)	1
Guatemala (Monitor Latino)	1
Honduras (Monitor Latino)	1
Hungary (Dance Top 40)	27
Hungary (Rádiós Top 40)	19
Hungary (Single Top 40)	5
Italy (FIMI)	1
Italy Airplay (EarOne)	1
Mexico (Monitor Latino)	6
Mexico Airplay (Billboard)	1
Netherlands (Dutch Top 40 Tipparade)	1
Nicaragua (Monitor Latino)	2
Panama (Monitor Latino)	1
Paraguay (Monitor Latino)	1
Peru (Monitor Latino)	1
Poland Airplay (ZPAV)	9
Puerto Rico (Monitor Latino)	3
Romania (Airplay 100)	1
Russia Airplay (TopHit) Alicia Remix	30
Slovakia Airplay (ČNS IFPI)	5
Slovakia Singles Digital (ČNS IFPI)	11
Spain (PROMUSICAE)	2
Sweden Heatseeker (Sverigetopplistan)	2
Ukraine Airplay (TopHit) Alicia Remix	70
Uruguay (Monitor Latino)	1
US Billboard Hot 100	71
US Hot Latin Songs (Billboard)	3
US Latin Airplay (Billboard)	1
US Latin Pop Airplay (Billboard)	1
Venezuela (Monitor Latino)	1

=== Year-end charts ===
Chart (2019)	Position
Argentina (Monitor Latino)	1
Austria (Ö3 Austria Top 40)	32
Belgium (Ultratop Wallonia)	15
Bolivia (Monitor Latino)	2
Chile (Monitor Latino)	1
Colombia (Monitor Latino)	1
Costa Rica (Monitor Latino)	1
Dominican Republic (Monitor Latino)	4
Ecuador (Monitor Latino)	2
El Salvador (Monitor Latino)	1
France (SNEP)	16
Guatemala (Monitor Latino)	2
Honduras (Monitor Latino)	2
Hungary (Dance Top 40)	79
Hungary (Single Top 40)	40
Italy (FIMI)	3
Mexico (Monitor Latino)	2
Nicaragua (Monitor Latino)	4
Panama (Monitor Latino)	2
Paraguay (Monitor Latino)	2
Peru (Monitor Latino)	2
Poland (ZPAV)	39
Portugal (AFP)	23
Puerto Rico (Monitor Latino)	94
Romania (Airplay 100)	2
Slovenia (SloTop50)	3
Spain (PROMUSICAE)	3
Switzerland (Schweizer Hitparade)	8
Uruguay (Monitor Latino)	2
US Hot Latin Songs (Billboard)	4
US Latin Airplay (Billboard)	3
Venezuela (Monitor Latino)	1

Chart (2020)	Position
Argentina Airplay (Monitor Latino)	27
Hungary (Rádiós Top 40)	63

=== Decade-end charts ===
Chart (2010–2019)	Position
US Hot Latin Songs (Billboard)	40

== Certifications ==
=== Original version ===
Region	Certification	Certified units/sales
Austria (IFPI Austria)	Gold	15,000^{‡}
Belgium (BRMA)	Gold	20,000^{‡}
France (SNEP)	Diamond	333,333^{‡}
Germany (BVMI)	Gold	200,000^{‡}
Italy (FIMI)	4× Platinum	200,000^{‡}
Mexico (AMPROFON)	4× Diamond+2× Platinum+Gold	1,350,000^{‡}
Switzerland (IFPI Switzerland)	4× Platinum	80,000^{‡}
United States (RIAA)	2× Platinum (Latin)	120,000^{‡}
^{‡} Sales+streaming figures based on certification alone.

=== Remix version ===
Region	Certification	Certified units/sales
Brazil (Pro-Música Brasil)	Diamond	160,000^{‡}
Canada (Music Canada)	Platinum	80,000^{‡}
Poland (ZPAV)	3× Platinum	60,000^{‡}
Portugal (AFP)	Platinum	10,000^{‡}
Spain (Promusicae)	7× Platinum	700,000^{‡}
United States (RIAA)	25× Platinum (Latin)	1,500,000^{‡}
^{‡} Sales+streaming figures based on certification alone.

== See also ==
- List of Airplay 100 number ones of the 2010s
- List of Billboard Argentina Hot 100 number-one singles of 2019
- List of airplay number-one hits of the 2010s (Argentina)
- List of Billboard number-one Latin songs of 2019
