= Una Foto =

2023 single by Mesita

Single by Mesita
- Language: Spanish
- English title: "A Photo"
- Released: August 15, 2023
- Genre: Reggaeton; RKT
- Length: 2:03
- Label: Turbo Diesel
- Songwriter: Santiago Messano
- Producer: Rxdri Molina

Mesita singles chronology
"Tiros" (2023)	"Una Foto" (2023)	"Cheto Mal" (2023)

Music video
- "Una Foto" on YouTube

"Una Foto" is a song by Uruguayan singer Mesita. It was released on August 15, 2023, through Turbo Diesel Records. It was written by Mesita and produced by Rxdri Molina. The song reached number 2 in Uruguay and number 11 in the Argentina Hot 100 chart.

== Music video ==
The music video for "Una Foto" was released on Mesita's YouTube channel on August 15, 2023.

== Charts ==
=== Weekly charts ===
Chart performance for "Una Foto"
Chart (2023)	Peak position
Argentina (Argentina Hot 100)	11

=== Monthly charts ===
Monthly chart performance for "Una Foto"
Chart (2023)	Peak position
Uruguay (CUD)	2

== Remix ==
"Una Foto Remix"

Single by Mesita, Nicki Nicole and Tiago PZK featuring Emilia
- Language: Spanish
- Released: January 4, 2024
- Recorded: 2023
- Genre: Reggaeton; RKT
- Length: 4:04
- Label: Turbo Diesel
- Songwriters: Santiago Messano; Rodrigo Molina; Tiago Uriel Pacheco Lezcano; María Emilia Mernes; Nicole Denise Cucco; Santiago Gabriel Ruíz
- Producer: Rxdri Molina

Mesita singles chronology
"Cheto Mal" (2023)	"Una Foto Remix" (2024)	"One Life" (2024)

Nicki Nicole singles chronology
"Alumbre" (2023)	"Una Foto Remix" (2024)	"Ojos Verdes" (2024)

Tiago PZK singles chronology
"I'll Be There" (2023)	"Una Foto Remix" (2024)	"Piel" (2024)

Emilia singles chronology
"Exclusive" (2023)	"Una Foto Remix" (2024)	"Jet Set" (2024)

Music video
- "Una Foto Remix" on YouTube

A remix with Argentine artists Nicki Nicole, Tiago PZK, and Emilia was released on January 4, 2024. The remix reached number one on the Argentina Hot 100 chart, becoming Mesita's first song to reach the top of said chart.

=== Background and release ===
On January 1, 2024, Mesita announced on Instagram a remix of "Una Foto" with Tiago PZK and two unknown artists. Nicki Nicole and Emilia confirmed to be the other two artists in the comments of the post. On January 2, all four artists announced the release date on their respective Instagram accounts. The remix was released on January 4, by Turbo Diesel Records, for digital download and streaming. It was written by the four artists alongside Santiago Gabriel Ruiz and its producer Rxdri Molina.

=== Music video ===
Directed by Federico Cabred, the music video for the remix was released on Mesita's YouTube channel on January 4. It shows the four artists singing around cars of different brands and models.

=== Charts ===
==== Weekly charts ====
Weekly chart performance for "Una Foto Remix"
Chart (2024)	Peak position
Argentina Hot 100 (Billboard)	1
Argentina (Monitor Latino)	9
Bolivia (Billboard)	1
Bolivia (Monitor Latino)	7
Chile (Billboard)	7
Chile (Monitor Latino)	12
Ecuador (Billboard)	21
Global 200 (Billboard)	46
Paraguay (Monitor Latino)	11
Peru (Billboard)	2
Peru (Monitor Latino)	2
Spain (PROMUSICAE)	6
Uruguay (Monitor Latino)	4

==== Monthly charts ====
Monthly chart performance for "Una Foto Remix"
Chart (2024)	Peak position
Paraguay (SGP)	10
Uruguay (CUD)	1

=== Certifications ===
Certifications for "Una Foto Remix"
Region	Certification	Certified units/sales
Spain (Promusicae)	2× Platinum	120,000^{‡}
^{‡} Sales+streaming figures based on certification alone.
