= Que Tire Pa Lante =

2019 song by Daddy Yankee

Single by Daddy Yankee
- Language: Spanish
- English title: "Pull Forward"
- Released: October 18, 2019
- Genre: Reggaeton
- Length: 3:30
- Label: El Cartel
- Songwriter: Ramón Ayala
- Producers: Daddy Yankee; DJ Urba; Rome

Daddy Yankee singles chronology
"China" (2019)	"Que Tire Pa Lante" (2019)	"Muévelo" (2020)

Music video
- "Que Tire Pa Lante" on YouTube

"Que Tire Pa Lante" (contraction of "Que Tire para Alante", syncopic form of "Que Tire para Adelante") (English: "Pull Forward") is a song by Puerto Rican rapper Daddy Yankee and was released through El Cartel Records on October 18, 2019. The song features cameos by fellow artists Anuel AA, Bad Bunny, Darell, Natti Natasha, Wisin and Lennox. It samples "A Who Seh Me Dun" by Cutty Ranks (1996).

== Background and promotion ==
Yankee announced the song and revealed the cover art on his social media on October 17, 2019. He described it as a reggaeton record out of 1970s in combination with the year 5000. He went on to post several videos teasing the song in the next hours. Yankee promised the song to be a "global hit" upon release. On October 17, the rapper performed the song on the Latin American Music Awards of 2019 in Los Angeles. Jessica Roiz of Billboard described the track as a combination of "old-school reggaeton and ‘90s dembow beat".

== Music video ==
A music video for "Que Tire Pa Lante" was released through Daddy Yankee's YouTube channel on October 18, 2019, and was directed by Marlon Peña. It shows Yankee and several other people invading a desert town and having a street dance competition.

== Charts ==
=== Weekly charts ===
Chart (2019)	Peak position
Argentina (Argentina Hot 100)	1
Bolivia (Monitor Latino)	3
Chile (Monitor Latino)	1
Colombia (National-Report)	8
Costa Rica (Monitor Latino)	1
Dominican Republic (Monitor Latino)	20
Ecuador (National-Report)	4
Ecuador (Monitor Latino)	6
El Salvador (Monitor Latino)	2
Guatemala (Monitor Latino)	12
Honduras (Monitor Latino)	2
Mexico Airplay (Billboard)	2
Mexican Pop Airplay (Billboard)	4
Nicaragua (Monitor Latino)	1
Panama (Monitor Latino)	1
Paraguay (SGP)	3
Paraguay (Monitor Latino)	1
Peru (Monitor Latino)	17
Puerto Rico (Monitor Latino)	1
Spain (PROMUSICAE)	24
Uruguay (Monitor Latino)	12
US Bubbling Under Hot 100 (Billboard)	8
US Hot Latin Songs (Billboard)	7
US Latin Airplay (Billboard)	1
US Latin Rhythm Airplay (Billboard)	1
Venezuela (Monitor Latino)	2

=== Year-end charts ===
Chart (2020)	Position
Argentina Airplay (Monitor Latino)	5
US Hot Latin Songs (Billboard)	21

== Certifications ==
Region	Certification	Certified units/sales
Brazil (Pro-Música Brasil)	Gold	20,000^{‡}
Spain (Promusicae)	Platinum	60,000^{‡}
United States (RIAA)	9× Platinum (Latin)	540,000^{‡}
^{‡} Sales+streaming figures based on certification alone.

== See also ==
- List of Billboard Argentina Hot 100 number-one singles of 2019
- List of Billboard number-one Latin songs of 2019
- List of Billboard number-one Latin songs of 2020
