= Lit Killah =

Argentine rapper and singer (born 1999)

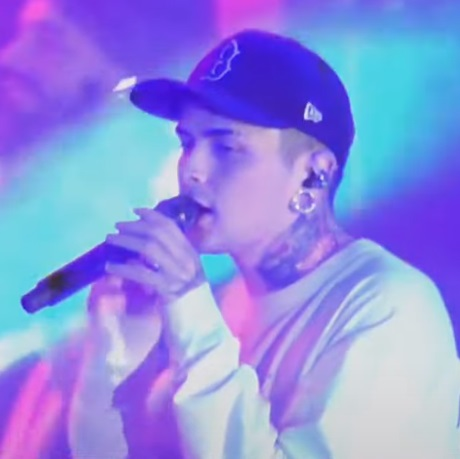
- Lit Killah in 2022

Background information
- Born: Mauro Román Monzón; October 4, 1999 (age 26); Argentina
- Origin: González Catán, Argentina
- Genres: Latin R&B; Latin trap; freestyle rap; reggaeton
- Occupations: Rapper; singer; songwriter; streamer
- Instrument: Vocals
- Years active: 2016–present
- Label: Warner Latina

Mauro Román Monzón (born October 4, 1999), known professionally as Lit Killah (often stylized as LIT killah), is an Argentine rapper, singer, songwriter, and streamer. He is known for his participation in freestyle rap battles, he has participated in local competitions in Argentina such as the renowned "El Quinto Escalón" where he competed during 2016 and 2017. In 2018 he started competing in the international freestyle rap competition called "God Level".

His popularity began to grow when in 2018 he released his single "Apaga el Celular". In 2020 he released his most successful single called "Flexin'" with Argentine producer Bizarrap. Both songs have exceeded 100 million views on YouTube.

== Career ==
=== Beginnings and first successes (2017-2021) ===
Lit Killah started in the world of rap thanks to freestyle battles. One of his first battles was against Duki in 2016. Lit Killah won the battles thanks to the rhyme "Brisa". The battle was one of the most viewed on YouTube that year. In that same year he competed in "El Quinto Escalón" but did not win. In 2017, Lit Killah managed to win his first competition in "El Quinto Escalón".

At the end of 2017, and coinciding with his birthday, he published his first single entitled "De$troy", a production faithful to the style demonstrated by Monzón in their previous encounters in freestyle battles. At just 18 years old, he signed a contract with Warner Music Argentina and starting 2018 he launched "Apaga el Celular", a song totally oriented to a melodic trap, whose official video clip already exceeds 100 million visits on YouTube. He subsequently released more singles, also featured as a guest artist on the song "Una Vez Más" of Numa, released on April 23. Jester released the following June had more than 20 million views in the first month since its premiere on YouTube.

=== MAWZ (2021-present) ===
On August 19, 2021 Lit Killah released his debut studio album MAWZ with the participation of Argentine artists such as Duki, Khea, María Becerra, Tiago PZK, FMK and Rusherking and it was also produced by Argentine producers Oniria and Big One.

== Discography ==
=== Albums ===
==== Studio albums ====
List of studio albums, with selected chart positions
Title	Album details	Peaks
Title	Album details	SPA
MAWZ	Release: August 19, 2021; Label: Warner Latina; Format: Digital download, streaming	15
SnipeZ	Release: August 19, 2021; Label: Warner Latina; Format: Digital download, streaming	—
Kustom	Release: October 23, 2024; Label: Warner Latina; Format: Digital download, streaming	—

=== Singles ===
==== As lead artist ====
List of singles as lead artist, with selected chart positions, showing year released, certifications and album name
Title	Year	Peak chart positions									Certifications	Album
Title	Year	ARG	BOL	CR	MEX Pop	NIC	PAR	PER	SPA	URU	Certifications	Album
"De$troy"	2017	—	—	—	—	—	—	—	—	—		Non-album singles
"Apaga el Celular"	2018	— (Note: "Apaga el Celular" did not enter the Argentina Digital Songs chart, but peaked at number 11 on the Argentina National Songs chart.)	—	—	—	—	—	—	—	—		Non-album singles
"Bufón"	2018	54	—	—	—	—	—	—	—	—	CAPIF: Gold	Non-album singles
"Si Te Vas"	2018	52	—	—	—	—	—	—	—	—		Non-album singles
"Tan Bien" (featuring Agus Padilla)	2018	22	—	—	—	—	—	—	—	—	CAPIF: Gold	Non-album singles
"Lit Killah: Bzrp Freestyle Sessions, Vol. 3" (with Bizarrap)	2018	—	—	—	—	—	—	—	—	—		Non-album singles
"Eclipse"	2019	32	—	—	—	—	—	—	—	—	CAPIF: Gold	Non-album singles
"Amor Ciego"	2019	—	—	—	—	—	—	—	—	—		Non-album singles
"Samurai" (featuring Big Soto)	2019	—	—	—	—	—	—	—	—	—		Non-album singles
"Wake Me"	2020	—	—	—	—	—	—	—	—	—		Non-album singles
"Flow Miami" (with Ñejo and Ez Made Dabeat)	2020	—	—	—	—	—	—	—	—	—		Non-album singles
"Te Sigo" (featuring Randy)	2020	—	—	—	—	—	—	—	—	—		Non-album singles
"Flexin'" (with Bizarrap)	2020	11	—	—	—	—	—	—	—	—	CAPIF: Platinum; AMPROFON: Gold; UNIMPRO: Platinum	Non-album singles
"Se Terminó" (featuring Kódigo)	2020	71	—	—	—	—	—	—	—	—		Non-album singles
"Cerca de Ti (remix)" (with Tiago PZK, Rusherking, Seven Kayne, Bhavi and Tobi)	2020	20	—	—	—	—	—	—	—	—		Non-album singles
"Change"	2021	64	—	—	—	—	—	—	—	—		MAWZ
"Yo Sé Que Tú" (with FMK and Tiago PZK featuring Rusherking)	2021	18	—	—	—	—	—	—	—	8	CAPIF: Platinum	Non-album single
"California"	2021	56	—	—	—	—	—	—	—	—		MAWZ
"Entre nosotros" (with Tiago PZK)	2021	1	10	12	—	13	11	6	37	1	CAPIF: 2× Platinum; AMPROFON: 2× Platinum; PROMUSICAE: Gold; RIAA: Platinum (Latin); UNIMPRO: Diamond	Non-album single
"Déjame Tranki" (with Khea)	2021	26	—	—	—	—	—	—	—	—		MAWZ
"Como + Nadie" (with MYA and Rusherking)	2021	27	—	—	—	—	—	—	—	—		Suena MYA!
"En la Oscuridad" (with María Becerra)	2021	25	—	—	—	—	—	—	—	—		MAWZ
"Ese Mensaje" (with FMK)	2021	—	—	—	—	—	—	—	—	—		MAWZ
"Mala Mía" (with Duki)	2021	25	—	—	—	—	—	—	—	—		MAWZ
"My Bag"	2021	—	—	—	—	—	—	—	—	—		MAWZ
"Entre nosotros (remix)" (with Tiago PZK, Nicki Nicole and María Becerra)	2022	1	5	— (Note: "Entre nosotros (remix)" did not enter the Monitor Latino Costa Rica chart, but peaked at number 11 on the Monitor Latino Costa Rica Latin Songs chart.)	20	12	48	3	10	7	PROMUSICAE: Gold; UNIMPRO: 3× Platinum	Non-album singles
"Ayer" (with Bhavi)	2022	—	—	—	—	—	—	—	—	—		Non-album singles
"La Trampa es Ley"	2022	2	—	—	—	—	—	—	84	—	UNIMPRO: Gold	Non-album singles
"Pa Co" (with Khea and Rusherking)	2022	—	—	—	—	—	—	—	—	—		Non-album singles
"Lion Heart" (with Kshmr and Divine featuring Jeremy Oceans and Karra)	2022	—	—	—	—	—	—	—	—	—		Non-album singles
"Los del Espacio" (among Los del Espacio)	2023	1	—	—	—	—	—	—	3	—		Non-album singles
"—" denotes a recording that did not chart or was not released in that territory.

==== As a featured artist ====
List of singles as featured artist, with selected chart positions, showing year released and album name
Title	Year	Peak chart positions			Certifications	Album
Title	Year	ARG	PAR	SPA	Certifications	Album
"Una Vez Más" (Numa featuring Lit Killah)	2018	—	—	—		Non-album singles
"Pocas Horas" (Alejo Park featuring Lit Killah and Kódigo)	2018	—	—	—		Non-album singles
"Bendito" (Hadrian featuring Lit Killah and Papatinho)	2019	—	—	—		Non-album singles
"Parte de Mi" (FMK featuring Lit Killah)	2019	61	—	—	CAPIF: Gold	Non-album singles
"Aroma" (JD Pantoja, Rauw Alejandro and Dayme y el High featuring Lit Killah)	2019	—	—	—		Non-album singles
"Masome" (with Naiky Unic featuring Ecko, Lalo Ebratt, Lit Killah and Brray)	2020	—	—	—		Non-album singles
"Yankee" (Smokk featuring Joaqo, Lit Killah and Big Deiv)	2020	—	—	—		Non-album singles
"Además de Mi (remix)" (Rusherking, Khea and Duki featuring Lit Killah, Tiago PZK and María Becerra)	2021	1	44	42	CAPIF: 3× Platinum	Non-album singles
"Nat Geo (remix)" (Falke 912 and Bhavi featuring Lit Killah)	2021	52	—	—		Non-album singles
"—" denotes a recording that did not chart or was not released in that territory.

=== Other charting songs ===
Title	Year	Peak Chart Positions	Album
Title	Year	ARG	Album
"A Tus Pies" (featuring Rusherking)	2021	93	MAWZ
