= La Mosca Tsé - Tsé =

Argentine musical group

La Mosca Tsé-Tsé
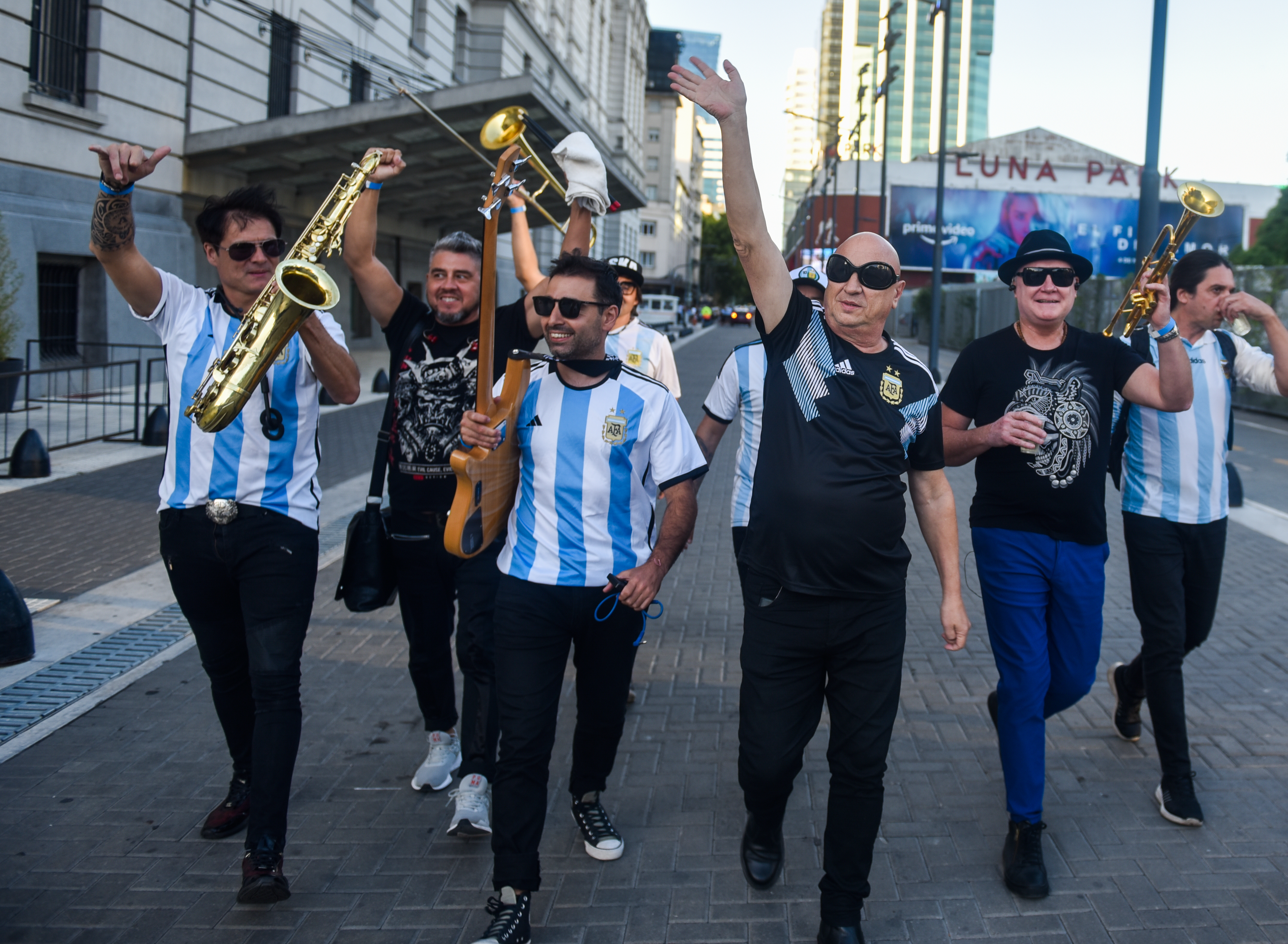
- La Mosca Tsé-Tsé in 2022.

Background information
- Also known as: La Mosca
- Origin: Buenos Aires, Argentina
- Genres: Ska, reggae, rock, pop
- Years active: 1995–2004, 2008–present
- Label: EMI
- Members: Guillermo Novellis (voice); Sergio Cairat (keyboards); Martín Cardoso (guitar); Pablo Tisera (trumpet); Raúl Mendoza (trumpet); Julio Clark (tenor saxophone); Marcelo Lutri (trombone); Fernando Castro (drums); Mariano Balcarce (percussion)
- Past members: Machi Borean (piano); Adrian Cionco (bass)

La Mosca Tsé-Tsé or simply La Mosca (in English: "The Tsetse Fly") is an Argentine rock fusion band, whose music consists of different genres like ska, cumbia, merengue, salsa and pop rock. The group was formed in 1995. Their songs reflect sporadic and eternal love while maintaining some mischief in their lyrics. While the current line-up was consolidated in March 1995, the history of the band goes back to the early 1990s with 'La Reggae & Roll Band', who did covers and some of their own songs in the town of Ramallo.

Among their most widely known songs are successes such as "Yo te quiero dar", "Para no verte más", "Cha Cha Cha", "Todos tenemos un amor", "Te quiero comer la boca", "Baila para mi" and "Muchachos, esta noche me emborracho".

On 11 November 2020, bassist Adrián Cionco died at the age of 48 from heart failure.

For the 2022 World Cup, the band adapted their song "Muchachos, esta noche me emborracho" from their 2003 album Tango Latino into an anthem supporting the Argentine team called "Muchachos, ahora nos volvimos a ilusionar," which includes lyrics celebrating Diego Maradona and Lionel Messi. It became an anthem for Argentine fans during the tournament.

== Discography ==
- 1998 – Corazones antárticos
- 1999 – Vísperas de Carnaval
- 2001 – Buenos Muchachos
- 2003 – Tango Latino
- 2004 – Biszzzes
- 2008 – El regreso (la fiesta continua)
- 2011 – Moskids: grandes canciones para chicos
- 2014 - La fiesta continúa
- 2024 - Muchachos

== See also ==
- Latino rock
