= Tiago PZK =

Argentine rapper (born 2001)

- Also known as: Gotti
- Born: Tiago Uriel Pacheco Lezcano; 3 August 2001 (age 25); Monte Grande, Buenos Aires, Argentina
- Genres: Latin R&B; reggaeton; Latin trap; freestyle rap
- Occupations: Rapper; singer
- Years active: 2018–present
- Labels: SyP; Grand Move; Warner Latina
- Website: tiagopzk.com

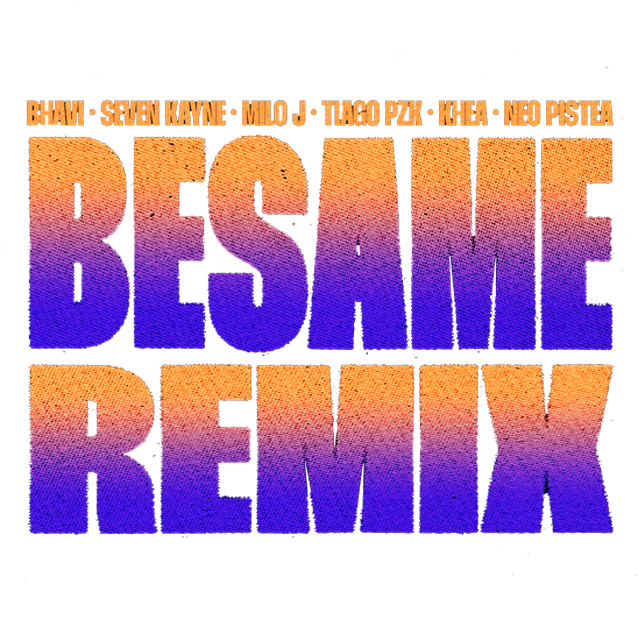
Cover art for BESAME (feat. Tiago PZK, Khea & Neo Pistea)

Tiago Uriel Pacheco Lezcano (born 3 August 2001), better known by his stage name Tiago PZK, is an Argentine rapper and singer, mostly related with R&B, reggaeton and rap. His hit-singles are "Sola", "Además de Mí", "Entre Nosotros", "Salimo de Noche", and "Cerca de Ti".

== Career ==
The artist, whose real name is Tiago Uriel Pacheco Lezcano, uses the suffix PZK in honor of his freestyle crew in Argentina. Tiago began gaining notoriety around 2016 with his participation in local rap battles in Argentina and his self-released track, "Andamo en la Cima". In 2019, he signed to indie SyP Recors in Argentina, eventually catching the eye of concert promoter Phil Rodriguez, the CEO of Move Concerts, one of Latin America's biggest indie promoters. Rodriguez signed Tiago to management and to his new Grand Move Records label. In 2022, the artist signed a record deal with Warner Music Latina.

By January 2022, Tiago was the artist with the most number-one singles on the Billboard Argentina Hot 100 chart, with four: "Además de Mí" (remix), "No Me Conocen" (remix), "Entre Nosotros", and "Salimo de Noche". He is now tied with María Becerra.

The release of Tiago's first album Portales met with controversy over lyrics that were characterised as racist; the track "Sabor a Miel" includes the line "he smokes and his eyes look like BTS." The singer later apologized on Twitter to the "people who were offended."

== Influences and style ==
Tiago's music "defies categorization, often shifting from R&B and even pop to rap. And instead of resorting to the sexually explicit lyrics that define so many reggaetón hits today, Tiago's themes lean more toward love and loss and his own journey from the housing projects of Buenos Aires to nascent fame." Tiago has listed Daddy Yankee, Tego Calderón and Justin Bieber as music influences. Today, Yankee's street music and Bieber's pop essence reflect in Tiago's diverse sound, which he says is "limitless": "I am not pigeonholed into a single genre. If I have to, I'll do reggaeton, rock, dancehall, and R&B."

== Filmography ==
=== Films ===
- Cato (2021)

== Discography ==
=== Studio albums ===
- Portales (2022)
- Gotti A (2024)
- Gotti B (2025)

=== EPs ===
- Valor de Calle (2019, with Emkier)

=== Soundtracks ===
- Cato (2021)

=== Singles ===
List of singles as lead artist, with selected chart positions, showing year released and album name
Title	Year	Peak chart positions									Certifications	Album
Title	Year	ARG	BOL	CR	MEX Pop	NIC	PAR	PER	SPA	URU	Certifications	Album
"Nadie Es Mejor"	2018	—	—	—	—	—	—	—	—	—		Non-album singles
"Bandolero"	2018	—	—	—	—	—	—	—	—	—		Non-album singles
"Sola"	2019	38	—	—	—	—	—	—	—	—		Cato
"En la Oscuridad" (with Emkier)	2020	—	—	—	—	—	—	—	—	—		Non-album singles
"Papichulo" (with Emkier featuring Krom and Lucas Beguerie)	2020	—	—	—	—	—	—	—	—	—		Non-album singles
"Viento"	2020	—	—	—	—	—	—	—	—	—		Non-album singles
"Cerca de Ti" (with Rusherking)	2020	20	—	—	—	—	—	—	—	—		Non-album singles
"Además de Mí" (Note: Tiago PZK is credited as a co-lead artist on the original version of "Además de Mí" but as a featured artist on the remix version of the song.) (with Rusherking or remix with Khea and Duki featuring María Becerra and Lit Killah)	2020	1	—	—	—	—	44	—	42	—	CAPIF: 3× Platinum	Non-album singles
"Flow de Barrio"	2021	—	—	—	—	—	—	—	—	—		Cato and Portales
"Yo Se Que Tu" (with Rusherking or remix with FMK and Lit Killah)	2021	18	—	—	—	—	—	—	—	— (Note: "Yo Se Que Tu" (remix) did not enter the Monitor Latino Top 20 Uruguay airplay chart, but peaked at number eight on the Uruguayan Chamber of Disc's monthly digital singles chart.)	CAPIF: 3× Platinum	Desde el Espacio
"Házmelo"	2021	67	—	—	—	—	—	—	—	—		Portales
"Cazame" (with María Becerra)	2021	6	—	—	—	—	—	—	—	13		Animal
"Prende la Cámara" (with FMK or remix with Mau y Ricky)	2021	18	—	—	—	—	53	—	—	—	CAPIF: Platinum	Desde el Espacio
"Loco"	2021	15	—	—	—	—	—	—	—	—	UNIMPRO: Gold	Cato
"Entre Nosotros" (with Lit Killah)	2021	1	10	12	—	13	11	6	37	14	CAPIF: 2× Platinum; AMPROFON: 2× Platinum; PROMUSICAE: Gold; UNIMPRO: Diamond	Portales
"Rápido Lento" (with Emilia)	2021	2	—	—	—	—	70	—	—	— (Note: "Rápido Lento" did not enter the Monitor Latino Top 20 Uruguay airplay chart, but peaked at number five on the Uruguayan Chamber of Disc's monthly digital singles chart.)	CAPIF: 2× Platinum; CUD: 2× Platinum	Tú Crees en Mí?
"Salimo de Noche" (with Trueno)	2021	1	—	—	24	—	1	15	8	— (Note: "Salimo de Noche" did not enter the Monitor Latino Top 20 Uruguay airplay chart, but peaked at number one on the Uruguayan Chamber of Disc's monthly digital singles chart.)	PROMUSICAE: Platinum; UNIMPRO: 2× Platinum	Portales and Bien o Mal
"Cuando Me Ves" (with Dani Ribba)	2021	82	—	—	—	—	—	—	—	—		Non-album singles
"Tiago PZK: Bzrp Music Sessions, Vol. 48" (with Bizarrap)	2021	3	—	—	—	—	1	8	3	— (Note: "Tiago PZK: Bzrp Music Sessions, Vol. 48" did not enter the Monitor Latino Top 20 Uruguay airplay chart, but peaked at number one on the Uruguayan Chamber of Disc's monthly digital singles chart.)	PROMUSICAE: 2× Platinum	Non-album singles
"Entre Nosotros" (remix) (with Lit Killah, María Becerra and Nicki Nicole)	2022	1 (Note: Uses combined chart entries for "Entre Nosotros" and "Entre Nosotros" (remix).)	5	15	20	12	10	1	10	— (Note: "Entre Nosotros" (remix) did not enter the Monitor Latino Top 20 Uruguay airplay chart, but peaked at number seven on the Uruguayan Chamber of Disc's monthly digital singles chart.)	PROMUSICAE: Gold; UNIMPRO: 3× Platinum	Non-album singles
"Now" (with Rusherking)	2022	15	—	—	—	—	—	—	—	—		Non-album singles
"Hablando de Love"	2022	47	—	—	—	—	—	—	—	—		Portales
"Nos Comemos" (with Ozuna)	2022	14	—	19	25	—	70	—	22	12	PROMUSICAE: Gold	Non-album single
"Traductor" (with Myke Towers)	2022	17	—	—	—	—	—	—	31	—		Portales
"Sex & Love" (with Rvssian)	2022	44	—	—	—	—	—	—	—	—		Portales
"El Último Beso" (with Tini)	2022	7	—	—	—	—	—	—	—	—	CAPIF: Platinum	Cupido
"Los del Espacio" (among Los del Espacio)	2023	1	—	—	—	—	—	—	3	—		Non-album singles
"Me Enteré" (with Tini)	2023	6	—	—	—	—	—	—	—	—		Non-album singles
"Asqueroso"	2023	42	—	—	—	—	—	—	—	—		Non-album singles
"I'll Be There" (with Robin Schulz and Rita Ora)	2023	—	—	—	—	—	—	—	—	—		Non-album singles
"Una Foto (Remix)" (with Mesita and Nicki Nicole featuring Emilia)	2024	1	9	—	—	—	11	2	6	4	PROMUSICAE: Platinum	Non-album singles
"Piel" (with Ke Personajes)	2024	3	2	—	—	—	—	—	—	3		Gotti A
"No Hay Que Preguntar" (with Keityn)	2024	—	—	—	—	—	—	—	—	—		Non-album single
"Mi Corazón"	2024	32	—	—	—	—	—	—	—	—		Gotti A
"De Vuelta" (with Manuel Turizo)	2024	41	—	—	—	—	—	—	64	—		Gotti A
"Alegría" (with Anitta and Emilia)	2024	3	—	—	—	—	—	—	—	—		Gotti A
"Sometimes" (with Teddy Swims)	2025	—	—	—	—	—	—	—	—	—		
"—" denotes a recording that did not chart or was not released in that territory.

=== Other charted songs ===
List of other charted songs, with chart positions, showing year released and album name
Title	Year	Peaks	Album
Title	Year	ARG	Album
"Borracho"	2022	72	Portales

=== Footnotes ===
Notes for peak chart positions

== Awards and nominations ==
List of awards and nominations received by Tiago PZK
Awards	Year	Recipient(s) and nominee(s)	Category	Result	Ref.
MTV Europe Music Awards	2022	Himself	Best Latin America South Act	Nominated	
MTV MIAW Awards	2022	Himself	Argentine Artist	Nominated	
MTV MIAW Awards	2023	Himself	Flow Artist	Nominated	
MTV MIAW Awards	2023	"Los del Espacio" (with Lit Killah, Duki, Emilia, FMK, Rusherking, María Becerra & Big One)	Music Ship of the Year	Won	
Premios Gardel	2024	"Los del Espacio" (with Lit Killah, Duki, Emilia, FMK, Rusherking, María Becerra & Big One)	Song of the Year	Nominated	
Premios Gardel	2024	"Los del Espacio" (with Lit Killah, Duki, Emilia, FMK, Rusherking, María Becerra & Big One)	Record of the Year	Nominated	
Premios Gardel	2024	"Los del Espacio" (with Lit Killah, Duki, Emilia, FMK, Rusherking, María Becerra & Big One)	Best Urban Song	Nominated	
Premios Gardel	2024	"Los del Espacio" (with Lit Killah, Duki, Emilia, FMK, Rusherking, María Becerra & Big One)	Best Urban Collaboration	Won	
Premios Gardel	2024	Portales	Best Urban Album	Nominated	
Premios Juventud	2022	Himself	The New Generation – Male	Nominated	
Premios Juventud	2023	Himself	Male Artist – On The Rise	Nominated	
Premios Juventud	2023	"Nos Comemos" (with Ozuna)	Best Urban Mix	Nominated	
Premio Lo Nuestro	2022	Himself	New Artist – Male	Nominated	
Premio Lo Nuestro	2023	"Entre Nosotros (Remix)" (with Lit Killah, María Becerra & Nicki Nicole)	Remix of the Year	Nominated	
Premio Lo Nuestro	2023	"Nos Comemos" (with Ozuna)	Urban Collaboration of the Year	Nominated	
