= Billboard Argentina =

Argentine edition of the Billboard magazine

- Categories: Entertainment industry
- Frequency: Monthly
- Publisher: Grupo ABC1
- Founded: August 2013; 12 years ago
- Company: Sociedad de Editores ABC1
- Country: Argentina
- Based in: Buenos Aires
- Language: Spanish
- Website: billboard.ar
- ISSN: 2344-9276
- OCLC: 935353219

Billboard Argentina is an Argentine entertainment media brand owned by Sociedad de Editores ABC1. It publishes pieces involving interviews, analysis of industry trends, shows and releases reviews, news, video, opinion, events, style, and the Billboard Argentina Hot 100 chart, which was launched in October 2018. Billboard Argentina was founded in 2013.

== See also ==
- Billboard charts
- Billboard (magazine)
- Billboard Brasil
- Billboard Japan
