= María Becerra discography =

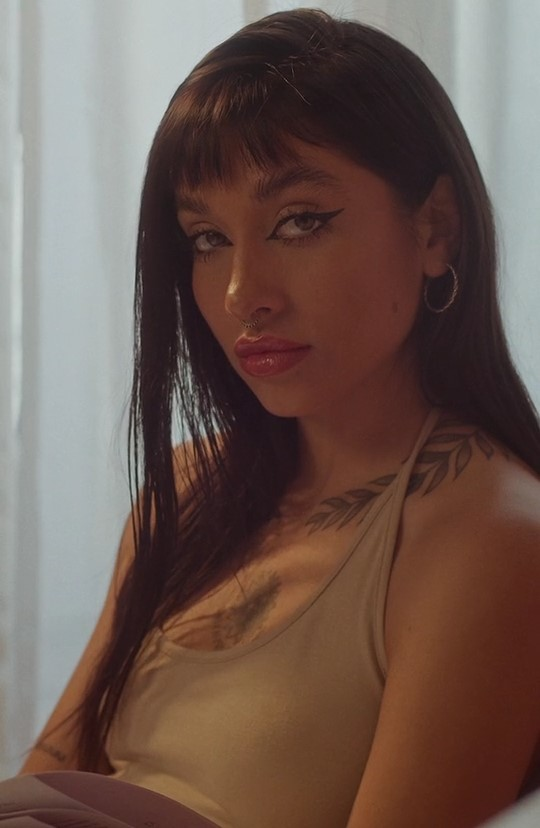
- Becerra in 2022
- Studio albums: 2
- EPs: 3
- Singles: 45
- Music videos: 42

The discography of Argentine singer María Becerra consists of two studio albums, three extended plays and forty-five singles (including five as a featured artist).

In 2021, Becerra released her debut studio album, Animal, through 300 Entertainment. She has collaborated with artists such as Camila Cabello, J Balvin, Tini, Prince Royce, Ivy Queen, Enrique Iglesias, Natti Natasha, Becky G, Mau y Ricky, Duki, Khea, Lit Killah, Mariah Angeliq, Bad Gyal and Paty Cantú, among others. Becerra is known for songs such as "Qué Más Pues?", "Miénteme", "Automático", "Corazón Vacío", "Lokita", "Wow Wow", "Mal Acostumbrao", "Los del Espacio" and "High", among others. In 2022, Becerra released her second studio album, La Nena de Argentina.

== Albums ==
=== Studio albums ===
List of studio albums, with selected details, and chart positions
Title	Details	Peaks
Title	Details	SPA
Animal	Released: 26 August 2021; Label: 300; Format: LP, digital download, streaming	49
La Nena de Argentina	Released: 8 December 2022; Label: 300; Format: LP, digital download, streaming	34
Quimera	Released: 20 November 2025; Label: Warner Latina; Format: CD, LP, digital download, streaming	—

== Extended plays ==
List of extended plays, with selected details
Title	Details
222	Released: 11 September 2019; Label: Self-released, 300; Format: Digital download, streaming
Animal, Pt. 1	Released: 25 February 2021; Label: 300; Format: Digital download, streaming
Acoustic Session	Released: 21 December 2023; Label: Warner Latina; Format: Digital download, streaming

== Singles ==
=== As lead artist ===
List of singles as lead artist, showing selected chart positions, certifications, and associated albums
Title	Year	Peak chart positions									Certifications	Album
Title	Year	ARG	BOL	CHL	ECU	PAR	PER	SPA	URU	WW	Certifications	Album
"High"	2019	59	—	—	—	—	—	62	—	— (Note: "High" did not enter the Billboard Global 200 chart, but it peaked at number 118 on the Billboard Global Excl. US chart.)	CAPIF: Platinum; PROMUSICAE: Gold	Non-album singles
"Dejemos Que Pase"	2020	71	—	—	—	—	—	—	—	—		Non-album singles
"Perdidamente"	2020	—	—	—	—	—	—	—	—	—		Non-album singles
"Moon" (featuring Dani Ribba)	2020	87	—	—	—	—	—	—	—	—		Non-album singles
"Tú Me Lo Haces Fácil"	2020	57	—	—	—	—	—	—	—	—		Non-album singles
"High" (Remix) (with Tini and Lola Índigo)	2020	2	—	—	—	76	—	—	—	—		Non-album singles
"Confiésalo" (with Rusherking)	2020	7	—	—	—	—	—	—	—	—		Non-album singles
"Animal" (with Cazzu)	2021	5	—	—	—	—	—	—	—	—		Animal, Pt. 1
"Acaramelao"	2021	4	—	—	—	—	—	—	—	—		Animal, Pt. 1
"Cazame" (with Tiago PZK)	2021	6	—	—	—	—	—	—	13	—		Animal
"Mi Debilidad"	2021	6	—	—	—	90	—	—	— (Note: "Mi Debilidad" did not enter the Monitor Latino Top 20 Uruguay airplay chart, but peaked at number ten on the Uruguayan Chamber of Disc's monthly digital singles chart.)	—	PROMUSICAE: Gold	Animal
"Wow Wow" (featuring Becky G)	2021	2	—	—	—	21	—	60	12	— (Note: "Wow Wow" did not enter the Billboard Global 200 chart, but it peaked at number 121 on the Billboard Global Excl. US chart.)	AMPROFON: Gold; PROMUSICAE: Gold	Animal
"No Eres Tú Soy Yo" (featuring Danny Ocean)	2021	—	—	—	—	—	—	—	—	—		Animal
"Felices x Siempre"	2022	8	—	—	—	— (Note: "Felices x Siempre" did not enter the Monitor Latino Paraguay Airplay chart, but peaked at number 9 on the Paraguay Pop Airplay chart.)	—	—	— (Note: "Felices x Siempre" did not enter the Monitor Latino Top 20 Uruguay airplay chart, but peaked at number 19 on the Uruguayan Chamber of Disc's monthly digital singles chart.)	—		Non-album single
"Ojalá"	2022	2	—	—	—	51	—	—	6	— (Note: "Ojalá" did not enter the Billboard Global 200 chart, but it peaked at number 141 on the Billboard Global Excl. US chart.)	CAPIF: 2× Platinum; AMPROFON: Gold; PROMUSICAE: Gold; RIAA: Gold (Latin)	La Nena de Argentina
"Automático"	2022	3	—	—	—	—	—	18	2	— (Note: "Automático" did not enter the Billboard Global 200 chart, but it peaked at number 128 on the Billboard Global Excl. US chart.)	CAPIF: 2× Platinum; AMPROFON: Gold; PROMUSICAE: 2× Platinum; RIAA: Platinum (Latin)	La Nena de Argentina
"La Nena de Argentina"	2022	21	—	—	—	—	—	—	11	—	CAPIF: Platinum; PROMUSICAE: Gold	La Nena de Argentina
"Desafiando el Destino"	2023	35	—	—	—	—	—	—	—	—	CAPIF: Platinum	La Nena de Argentina
"Adiós" (solo or live version with Ráfaga)	2023	4	19	15	—	—	21	—	3	—	CAPIF: Gold; PROMUSICAE: Gold	La Nena de Argentina
"Te Cura"	2023	13	—	—	—	—	—	—	—	—		Fast X
"Los del Espacio" (with Lit Killah, Tiago PZK, Duki, Emilia, Rusherking, Big One and FMK)	2023	1	5	2	22	20	6	3	1	38	CAPIF: 2× Platinum; PROMUSICAE: 6× Platinum	Non-album single
"Corazón Vacío"	2023	1	24	16	— (Note: "Corazón Vacío" did not enter the Billboard Ecuador Songs chart, but it peaked at number 11 on the Monitor Latino Ecuador Urban Airplay chart.)	—	25	21	—	111	AMPROFON: Gold; PROMUSICAE: 3× Platinum	Quimera
"Piscina" (with Chencho Corleone and Ovy on the Drums)	2023	4	— (Note: "Piscina" did not enter the Billboard Bolivia Songs chart, but it peaked at number six on the Monitor Latino Bolivia Airplay chart.)	— (Note: "Piscina" did not enter the Billboard Chile Songs chart, but it peaked at number two on the Monitor Latino Chile Airplay chart.)	— (Note: "Piscina" did not enter the Billboard Ecuador Songs chart, but it peaked at number three on the Monitor Latino Ecuador Airplay chart.)	—	—	84	9	—		Non-album singles
"Primer Aviso" (with Ivy Queen)	2024	10	—	— (Note: "Primer Aviso" did not enter the Billboard Chile Songs chart, but it peaked at number 12 on the Monitor Latino Chile Airplay chart.)	— (Note: "Primer Aviso" did not enter the Billboard Ecuador Songs chart, but it peaked at number 11 on the Monitor Latino Ecuador Urban Airplay chart.)	—	— (Note: "Primer Aviso" did not enter the Billboard Peru Songs chart, but it peaked at number seven on the Monitor Latino Peru Urban Airplay chart.)	—	—	—		Non-album singles
"Imán (Two of Us)"	2024	2	—	—	—	78	—	—	3	—		Non-album singles
"Borracha" (with Gloria Trevi)	2024	81	—	—	—	—	—	—	—	—		Non-album singles
"Agora"	2024	3	22	— (Note: "Agora" did not enter the Billboard Chile Songs chart, but it peaked at number 15 on the Monitor Latino Chile Airplay chart.)	—	—	—	—	8	—		Non-album singles
"Sexo es la Moda" (with Yandel)	2024	31	—	—	—	—	—	—	15	—		Non-album singles
"Tatú"	2025	57	—	—	—	—	—	—	—	—		Quimera
"Ramen Para Dos" (with Paulo Londra)	2025	1	5	— (Note: "Ramen para Dos" did not enter the Billboard Chile Songs chart, but it peaked at number 17 on the Monitor Latino Chile Urban Airplay chart.)	—	69	16	55	7	— (Note: "Ramen para Dos" did not enter the Billboard Global 200 chart, but it peaked at number 100 on the Billboard Global Excl. US chart.)		Quimera
"Infinitos como el Mar"	2025	8	—	—	—	—	—	—	—	—		Quimera
"7 Vidas"	2025	6	— (Note: "7 Vidas" did not enter the Billboard Chile Songs chart, but it peaked at number nine on the Monitor Latino Bolivia Airplay chart.)	— (Note: "7 Vidas" did not enter the Billboard Chile Songs chart, but it peaked at number 16 on the Monitor Latino Chile Airplay chart.)	—	—	—	—	2	—		Quimera
"Hasta Que Me Enamoro" (with Tini)	2025	3	— (Note: "Hasta Que Me Enamoro" did not enter the Billboard Bolivia Songs chart, but it peaked at number ten on the Monitor Latino Bolivia Pop Rhythmic Airplay chart.)	— (Note: "Hasta Que Me Enamoro" did not enter the Billboard Chile Songs chart, but it peaked at number five on the Monitor Latino Chile Pop Airplay chart.)	— (Note: "Hasta Que Me Enamoro" did not enter the Billboard Ecuador Songs chart, but it peaked at number eight on the Monitor Latino Ecuador Pop Airplay chart.)	— (Note: "Hasta Que Me Enamoro" did not enter the SGP Paraguay Airplay chart, but it peaked at number 11 on the Monitor Latino Paraguay Airplay chart.)	—	95	3	—		Quimera
"Jojo"	2025	11	—	—	—	—	—	—	— (Note: "Jojo" did not enter the Monitor Latino Uruguay Airplay chart, but it peaked at number ten on the Monitor Latino Uruguay Pop Rhythmic Airplay chart.)	—		Quimera
"Hace Calor" (with El Alfa)	2025	14	—	—	—	—	—	—	14	—		Quimera
"Romántica" (with Jay Wheeler)	2025	48	—	—	—	39	—	—	11	—		Quimera
"Qué Ganas de Comerte" (with Jere Klein & Lucky Brown)	2026	7	—	7	—	—	—	—	11	—		Non-album singles
"—" denotes a recording that did not chart or was not released in that territory.

=== As co-lead artist ===
List of singles as co-lead artist, showing selected chart positions, certifications, and associated albums
Title	Year	Peak chart positions										Certifications	Album
Title	Year	ARG	COL	ITA	MEX	PAR	POR	SPA	SWI	URU	US Latin	Certifications	Album
"AYNEA" (Remix) (FMK with María Becerra and Beret)	2020	32	—	—	—	—	—	—	—	—	—	CAPIF: Gold	Non-album singles
"Si Yo Fuera Tú" (Paty Cantú with María Becerra)	2021	—	—	—	—	—	—	—	—	—	—		Non-album singles
"Miénteme" (Tini with María Becerra)	2021	1	29	—	— (Note: "Miénteme" did not enter the Billboard Mexico Airplay chart, but peaked at number 18 on the Mexico Espanol Airplay chart.)	2	—	3	—	1	—	CAPIF: Diamond; AMPROFON: Diamond+Gold; ASINCOL: Gold; CUD: 3× Platinum; IFPI CHL: Platinum; PROMUSICAE: 7× Platinum; UNIMPRO: Platinum	Cupido
"Te Necesito" (Khea with María Becerra)	2021	3	—	—	—	82	—	—	—	—	—		Non-album single
"¿Qué Más, Pues?" (J Balvin with María Becerra)	2021	1	8	60	27	6	26	2	54	3	14	CAPIF: Platinum; AFP: Gold; AMPROFON: Diamond+4× Platinum; FIMI: Gold; IFPI CHL: Gold; PROMUSICAE: 6× Platinum	Jose
"Bobo" (Mariah Angeliq with María Becerra and Bad Gyal)	2021	96	—	—	—	—	—	41	—	—	—	PROMUSICAE: Gold	La Tóxica
"Mal Acostumbrao" (Mau y Ricky with María Becerra)	2021	4	—	—	25	64	—	—	—	— (Note: "Mal Acostumbrao" did not enter the Monitor Latino Top 20 Uruguay airplay chart, but peaked at number seven on the Uruguayan Chamber of Disc's monthly digital singles chart.)	—	CAPIF: 2× Platinum; PROMUSICAE: Gold	Desgenerados Mixtape
"En la Oscuridad" (Lit Killah with María Becerra)	2021	25	—	—	—	—	—	—	—	—	—		MAWZ
"Antes de Ti" (Rusherking with María Becerra)	2021	3	—	—	—	—	—	—	—	— (Note: "Antes de Ti" did not enter the Monitor Latino Top 20 Uruguay airplay chart, but peaked at number eight on the Uruguayan Chamber of Disc's monthly digital singles chart.)	—		Non-album singles
"Los Tragos" (Reik with María Becerra)	2021	12	—	—	24	—	—	—	—	7	— (Note: "Los Tragos" did not enter the Billboard Hot Latin Songs chart, but it peaked at number 29 on the Billboard Latin Airplay chart.)	AMPROFON: Gold; PROMUSICAE: Gold	Non-album singles
"Entre Nosotros" (Remix) (Tiago PZK and Lit Killah with María Becerra and Nicki Nicole)	2022	1	—	—	— (Note: "Entre Nosotros (remix)" did not enter the Billboard Mexico Airplay chart, but peaked at number 20 on the Mexico Espanol Airplay chart.)	10	—	10	—	— (Note: "Entre Nosotros (remix)" did not enter the Monitor Latino Top 20 Uruguay airplay chart, but peaked at number seven on the Uruguayan Chamber of Disc's monthly digital singles chart.)	—	PROMUSICAE: Platinum; RIAA: Gold (Latin)	Non-album singles
"Tranquila" (FMK with María Becerra)	2022	3	—	—	—	43	—	—	—	8	—	CAPIF: Platinum	Desde el Espacio
"Marte" (Sofía Reyes with María Becerra)	2022	3	—	—	24	—	—	—	—	15	—	PROMUSICAE: Gold; RIAA: Gold (Latin)	Mal de Amores
"Te Espero" (Prince Royce with María Becerra)	2022	33	6	—	49	— (Note: "Te Espero" did not enter the Monitor Latino Paraguay Airplay chart, but peaked at number 16 on the Paraguay Pop Airplay chart.)	—	—	—	— (Note: "Te Espero" did not enter the Monitor Latino Top 20 Uruguay airplay chart, but peaked at number 16 on the Top 20 Uruguay Latin Airplay chart.)	26	PROMUSICAE: Platinum; RIAA: 2× Platinum (Latin)	Llamada Perdida
"Hasta los Dientes" (Camila Cabello with María Becerra)	2022	24	—	—	— (Note: "Hasta los Dientes" did not enter the Billboard Mexico Airplay chart, but peaked at number 29 on the Mexico Espanol Airplay chart.)	—	—	—	—	6	—		Familia
"Maléfica" (Cazzu with María Becerra)	2022	20	—	—	—	—	—	—	—	—	—		Nena Trampa
"Berlin" (Zion & Lennox with María Becerra)	2022	11	—	—	—	—	—	—	—	10	— (Note: "Berlin" did not enter the Billboard Hot Latin Songs chart, but it peaked at number 16 on the Billboard Latin Airplay chart.)		Non-album single
"Discoteka" (Lola Índigo with María Becerra)	2022	24	—	—	—	—	—	43	—	—	—	PROMUSICAE: Platinum	El Dragón
"Lokita" (Natti Natasha with María Becerra)	2022	50	—	—	—	—	—	—	—	—	— (Note: "Lokita" did not enter the Billboard Hot Latin Songs chart, but it peaked at number 45 on the Billboard Latin Airplay chart.)		Nasty Singles
"La Ducha" (Remix) (Elena Rose with María Becerra and Greeicy featuring Becky G and Tini)	2022	—	—	—	—	—	—	—	—	—	—		Non-album single
"Éxtasis" (Manuel Turizo with María Becerra)	2022	27	—	—	—	—	—	68	—	—	43	PROMUSICAE: Gold; RIAA: Platinum (Latin)	2000
"Amigos" (Pablo Alborán with María Becerra)	2022	43	—	—	—	—	—	55	—	—	—	PROMUSICAE: 2× Platinum; RIAA: Gold (Latin)	La Cuarta Hoja
"Perfecta" (Versión 2023) (Miranda! with María Becerra and FMK)	2023	6	—	—	—	28	—	—	—	14	—	AMPROFON: Gold	Hotel Miranda!
"Extrañándote" (Gera MX with María Becerra)	2023	—	—	—	—	—	—	—	—	—	—	AMPROFON: Gold	Mustang 65'
"El Amor de Mi Vida" (Los Ángeles Azules with María Becerra)	2023	2	—	—	—	—	—	—	—	4	— (Note: "El Amor de Mi Vida" did not enter the Billboard Hot Latin Songs chart, but it peaked at number four on the Billboard Latin Airplay chart.)		Se Agradece
"9:45" (Remix) (Prabh Singh with María Becerra)	2023	—	—	—	—	—	—	—	—	—	—		Non-album single
"Asi Es La Vida" (Enrique Iglesias with María Becerra)	2023	17	—	—	—	—	—	25	—	8	— (Note: "Así Es La Vida" did not enter the Billboard Hot Latin Songs chart, but it peaked at number 12 on the Billboard Latin Airplay chart.)	AMPROFON: Platinum+Gold; PROMUSICAE: 3× Platinum; RIAA: 3× Platinum (Latin)	Final (Vol. 2)
"Mentirosa" (Remix) (Ráfaga with María Becerra)	2023	34	—	—	—	—	—	—	—	—	—		Non-album singles
"Sin Ti" (Gims with María Becerra)	2024	—	—	—	—	—	—	—	—	—	—		Non-album singles
"Lady Madrizzz" (Remix) (Céro with María Becerra)	2024	—	—	—	—	—	—	—	—	—	—		Non-album singles
"Low Key" (Beéle with María Becerra and Joeboy featuring Humby)	2024	—	—	—	—	—	—	—	—	—	—		TBA
"Cuando Te Vi" (Note: Subtitled "Crossover #5".) (Big One with María Becerra and Trueno)	2024	3	—	—	—	—	—	14	—	—	—	PROMUSICAE: Platinum	Non-album singles
"Pa' Qué Volviste?" (Elena Rose with María Becerra)	2024	—	—	—	—	—	—	—	—	—	—		Non-album singles
"Without Love" (Paris Hilton with María Becerra)	2024	—	—	—	—	—	—	—	—	—	—		Infinite Icon
"Jingle Bell Rock" (Bobby Helms with María Becerra)	2024	—	—	—	—	—	—	—	—	—	—		Non-album singles
"La Reina" (Remix) (Lola Índigo with María Becerra and Villano Antillano)	2025	60	—	—	—	—	—	—	—	—	—		Non-album singles
"Lonely" (Katteyes with María Becerra and Big One)	2026	24	—	—	—	—	—	—	—	—	—		Non-album singles
"—" denotes a recording that did not chart or was not released in that territory.

=== As a featured artist ===
List of singles as a featured artist, showing year released, chart positions, certifications, and originating album
Title	Year	Peak chart positions				Certifications	Album
Title	Year	ARG	PAR	SPA	US Latin Airplay	Certifications	Album
"En Tu Cuerpo" (Remix) (Lyanno, Rauw Alejandro and Lenny Tavárez featuring María Becerra)	2020	16	38	—	—	PROMUSICAE: Platinum	El Cambio
"Además de Mí" (Remix) (Rusherking, Khea and Duki featuring María Becerra, Lit Killah and Tiago PZK)	2021	1	44	42	—	CAPIF: 3× Platinum; PROMUSICAE: Gold	Non-album single
"Suelta" (Dímelo Flow, Rauw Alejandro and Farruko featuring Mr. Vegas, María Becerra and Fatman Scoop)	2022	—	18	—	19		Always Dream
"Latte" (Dalex, Lenny Tavárez, Sech, Justin Quiles and Dímelo Flow featuring María Becerra)	2024	18	—	70	—		The Academy: Segunda Misión
"Spicy Margarita" (Jason Derulo and Michael Bublé featuring María Becerra)	2024	—	—	—	—		Non-album single
"—" denotes a recording that did not chart or was not released in that territory.

== Other charted songs ==
List of other charted songs, showing year released, chart positions, and originating album
Title	Year	Peak chart positions		Album
Title	Year	ARG	ITA	Album
"Dime Cómo Hago"	2019	100	—	222
"A Solas"	2021	92	—	Animal, Pt. 1
"Bella e Brutta Notizia" (Geolier featuring María Becerra)	2024	—	42	Dio lo sa
"Frutilla del Pastel"	2025	34	—	Quimera
"Que Tú Me Quieras"	2025	84	—	Quimera
"Recuerdo Que Nunca Existió"	2025	82	—	Quimera
"Slow It Down"	2025	62	—	Quimera
"Pierdo la Cabeza" (with Taichu)	2025	47	—	Quimera
"Mi Amor" (with Rei)	2025	7	—	Quimera
"—" denotes a recording that did not chart or was not released in that territory.

== Guest appearances ==
List of other appearances, showing year released, other artist(s) credited and album name
Title	Year	Other artist(s)	Album
"Acaramelao" / "Endúlzame Los Oídos" (Headphone Mix)	2022	Patricia Sosa	Non-album song
"Entre Nosotros (Remix)" (Live Version)	2023	Tiago PZK and Lit Killah	Portales (Deluxe Edition)
"Pradax"	2023	Fuerza Regida	Pa Las Baby's y Belikeada
"Hasta Olvidarte"	2024	Mau y Ricky and Arcángel	Hotel Caracas

== Music videos ==
List of music videos with release year and director(s)
Year	Title	Other artist(s)	Director(s)	Ref.
As a lead artist
2019	"High"	None	Julián Levy	
2020	"Dejemos Que Pase"	None	Julián Levy	
2020	"Perdidamente"	None	Julián Levy	
2020	"Tú Me Lo Haces Fácil"	None	Julián Levy	
2020	"High (Remix)"	Tini and Lola Índigo	Julián Levy	
2020	"Confiésalo"	Rusherking	Julián Levy	
2020	"AYNEA (Remix)"	FMK and Beret	Julián Levy	
2021	"Animal"	Cazzu	Julián Levy	
2021	"Acaramelao"	None	Julián Levy	
2021	"Si Yo Fuera Tú"	Paty Cantú	Julián Levy	
2021	"Miénteme"	Tini	Andrés Peskin	
2021	"Te Necesito"	Khea	Facundo Ballve	
2021	"Qué Más Pues?"	J Balvin	José Emilio Sagaró	
2021	"Cazame"	Tiago PZK	Julián Levy	
2021	"Bobo"	Mariah Angeliq and Bad Gyal	José Emilio Sagaró	
2021	"Mi Debilidad"	None	Julián Levy	
2021	"Wow Wow"	Becky G	Julián Levy	
2021	"Mal Acostumbrao"	Mau y Ricky	Santiago Lafee and Richard Mountainous	
2021	"En la Oscuridad"	Lit Killah	Agustin Portela	
2021	"Antes de Ti"	Rusherking	Agustin Portela	
2021	"No Eres Tú Soy Yo"	Danny Ocean	Julián Levy	
2021	"Los Tragos"	Reik	Nuno Gomes	
2022	"Entre Nosotros (Remix)"	Tiago PZK, Lit Killah and Nicki Nicole	Facundo Ballve	
2022	"Tranquila"	FMK	Julián Levy	
2022	"Marte"	Sofía Reyes	Mike Ho	
2022	"Felices x Siempre"	None	Julián Levy	
2022	"Te Espero"	Prince Royce	Julián Levy	
2022	"Hasta los Dientes"	Camila Cabello	Charlotte Rutherford	
2022	"Maléfica"	Cazzu	Facundo Ballve	
2022	"Ojalá"	None	Julián Levy	
2022	"Berlin"	Zion & Lennox	Julián Levy	
2022	"Discoteka"	Lola Índigo	Julián Levy	
2022	"Automático"	None	Julián Levy	
2022	"Lokita"	Natti Natasha	Nuno Gomes	
2022	"Éxtasis"	Manuel Turizo	Fdave	
2022	"Amigos"	Pablo Alborán	Lucas Fossati and Julián Levy	
2022	"La Nena de Argentina"	None	Julián Levy	
2023	"Desafiando el Destino"	None	Julián Levy	
2023	"Perfecta (Versión 2023)"	Miranda! and FMK	Melanie Anton Def	
2023	"Te Cura"	None	Julián Levy	
2023	"Los del Espacio"	Lit Killah, Tiago PZK, Duki, Emilia, Rusherking, Big One and FMK	Ballve	
2023	"Corazón Vacío"	None	Julián Levy	
2023	"Extrañándote"	Gera MX	Resto del Mundo	
2023	"El Amor de Mi Vida"	Los Ángeles Azules	Julián Levy and Lucas Fossati	
2023	"Asi es la Vida"	Enrique Iglesias	Maxim Bohichik	
2023	"Piscina"	Chencho Corleone and Ovy on the Drums	Julián Levy	
2023	"Mentirosa (Remix)"	Ráfaga	Unknown	
2024	"Sin Ti"	Gims	Jon Primo and Réda Nouiga	
2024	"Primer Aviso"	Ivy Queen	Julián Levy	
2024	"Iman (Two of Us)"	None	Julián Levi and Lucas Fossati	
2024	"Low Key"	Beéle, Joeboy and Humby	Rob Dade	
2024	"Cuando Te Vi"	Big One and Trueno	Unknown	
2024	"Borracha"	Gloria Trevi	Julián Levi and Lucas Fossati	
2024	"Agora"	None	Julián Levi and Lucas Fossati	
2024	"Sexo es la Moda"	Yandel	Julián Levy	
2024	"Pa' Qué Volviste?"	Elena Rose	Bernardo García-Salgado Novo	
2024	"Without Love"	Paris Hilton	Brian Ziff	
2024	"Jingle Bell Rock"	Bobby Helms	Unknown	
2025	"La Reina (Remix)"	Lola Índigo and Villano Antillano	Willy Rodríguez	
As a featured artist
2020	"En Tu Cuerpo (Remix)"	Lyanno, Rauw Alejandro and Lenny Tavárez	Gus	
2021	"Además de Mí (Remix)"	Rusherking, Duki, Khea, Lit Killah and Tiago PZK	Agustín Portela	
2022	"Suelta"	Dimelo Flow, Rauw Alejandro, Farruko, Mr. Vegas and Fatman Scoop	Charlie Nelson Moreno	
2024	"Latte"	Dalex, Lenny Tavárez, Sech, Justin Quiles and Dímelo Flow	Fernando Lugo	
