= Los 40 Music Awards 2024 =

Spanish music awards ceremony

LOS40 Music Awards Santander 2024
- Date: 8 November 2024
- Location: Palau Sant Jordi, Barcelona
- Presented by: Los 40

Highlights
- Most wins: Myke Towers and Rauw Alejandro (3 each)
- Most nominations: Myke Towers and Rauw Alejandro (7 each)
- Website: los40.com/tag/los40_music_awards/a/

Television/radio coverage
- Network: Divinity; Los 40; YouTube; Originales por M+

The 19th Los 40 Music Awards, also named Los 40 Music Awards Santander 2024 for sponsorship reasons, took place on 8 November 2024, at Palau Sant Jordi in Barcelona, to recognize the best in Spanish and international music of 2024. It was the second time – and the first since 2016 – that the ceremony took place in Barcelona.

The show paid tribute to those affected by the 2024 Spanish floods, becoming a telethon and partnering with the Red Cross to raise funds for the cause.

== Performers ==
Artist(s)	Song(s)
Maluma	"Borró Cassette" "Felices los 4" "Hawái" "Chantaje" "Corazón" "Coco Loco"
Estopa	"Sola" "Como Camarón"
Teddy Swims	"Lose Control" "Bad Dreams" "The Door"
Rauw Alejandro	"Aquel Nap ZzZz" (intro) "Pasaporte" "Déjame Entrar" "Santa"
Annalisa	"Sinceramente (cuando cuando cuando)"
Saiko	"Yo lo soñe" "Bad Gyal" (with Dei V & JC Reyes)
Abraham Mateo	"No se vivir si no es contigo" "Tienes que saber" (with Naiara)
Benson Boone	"Beautiful Things"
Kapo	"Ohnana" "UWAIE"
Lola Índigo	"La Reina"
Ana Mena	"Carita Triste"
Myke Towers	"La Falda" "También" "DEGENERE"
Dani Fernández	"Me has invitado a bailar" "Todo cambia"
Bad Gyal	"Fiebre" "Chulo" "Perdió ese culo" "La que no se mueva" "Flow 2000" "Duro de verdad"
Álvaro de Luna	"Nuestra canción"
Marlon	"Olvidé Olvidarte" (with Álvaro de Luna)
Manuel Turizo	"Qué Pecao" (with Kapo) "1000COSAS" (with Lola Índigo)

DJ

- Óscar Martínez

== Winners and nominees ==
The nominees were revealed on 8 October 2024. Winners are listed first and highlighted in bold.

List of winners and nominees for the LOS40 Music Awards 2024
**Spain**
Best Act	Best New Act
**Lola Índigo**; Abraham Mateo; Aitana; Ana Mena; Dani Fernández; Enrique Iglesias	**Ruslana**; La Beba; Malva; Naiara; Noan; Soge Culebra
Best Album	Best Song
**Insomnio – Abraham Mateo**; Uno – Álvaro de Luna; Final (Vol. 2) – Enrique Iglesias; Estopía – Estopa; Lugar Paraíso – Nil Moliner; Noctalgia – Vicco	**"Madrid City" – Ana Mena**; "Tienes que saber" – Abraham Mateo & Naiara; "Superhéroes" – Beret & Mr. Rain; "Todo cambia" – Dani Fernández; "Así es la vida" – Enrique Iglesias & María Becerra; "La Reina" – Lola Índigo
Best Video	Best Live Act
**"Engatusao" – Vicco**; "Perdió este culo" – Bad Gyal; "b.o.b.o." – Paula Koops; "Titiritar" – Pol Granch; "Hermosa casualidad" – Sen Senra & Aitana; "Quédate, mi corazón" – Walls	**Dani Fernández**; Ana Mena; Bombai; David Otero; DePol; Nil Moliner
Best Collaboration	Del 40 al 1 Award
**"Olvidé Olvidarte"** – **Marlon & Álvaro de Luna**; "Akureyri" – Aitana & Sebastián Yatra; "Carita Triste" – Ana Mena & Emilia; "Superhéroes" – Beret & Mr. Rain; "1000cosas" – Lola Índigo & Manuel Turizo; "Llorando en el Lambo" – Lérica, Mar Lucas & Daviles de Novelda	**Beret**; Charlie USG; DePol; Hilario; Marlena; Marlon
Best Urban Act	Best Urban Song
**Bad Gyal**; Omar Montes; Ptazeta; Rels B; Recycled J; Saiko	**"Bad Gyal" – Saiko**; "Tu silueta" – Diegote; "Vicio duro" – J Francis; "Grasa" – Nathy Peluso; "Goteras" – Omar Montes; "No pienso llamar" – Soge Culebra & Quevedo
Best Festival or Event	Best Tour or Concert
**Coca-Cola Music Experience**; Boombastic; Bresh; Concert Music Festival; La Velada del Año IV; Love the Twenties	**Gira 25 Años – Estopa**; alpha Sumer Tour – Aitana; Uno Tour – Álvaro de Luna; La Joia 24 Karats Tour – Bad Gyal; Nave Dragón Tour – Lola Índigo; Corazón y Flecha Tour – Manuel Carrasco
Best LOS40 Summer Live Act
**Adexe y Nau**; David Otero; Mar Lucas; Polo Nández; Recycled J; Vicco
**International**
Best Act	Best New Act
**Teddy Swims**; Benson Boone; Beyoncé; Dua Lipa; Sabrina Carpenter; Shaboozey	**Benson Boone**; Artemas; Mark Ambor; Myles Smith; Shaboozey; Tyla
Best Album	Best Song
**I've Tried Everything but Therapy (Part 1) – Teddy Swims**; Eternal Sunshine – Ariana Grande; Fireworks & Rollerblades – Benson Boone; Hit Me Hard and Soft – Billie Eilish; Radical Optimism – Dua Lipa; The Tortured Poets Department – Taylor Swift	**"Beautiful Things" – Benson Boone**; "Texas Hold 'Em" – Beyoncé; "feelslikeimfallinginlove" – Coldplay; "Houdini" – Dua Lipa; "Espresso" – Sabrina Carpenter; "Lose Control" – Teddy Swims
Best Live Act
**Coldplay**; Benson Boone; Tate McRae; Taylor Swift; Teddy Swims; Travis Scott
**Global Latin**
Best Act	Best New Act
**Rauw Alejandro**; Camilo; Emilia; María Becerra; Manuel Turizo; Maluma	**Kapo**; Cris MJ; Dei V; Ela Taubert; Gonzy; Key Key
Best Album	Best Song
**La Pantera Negra** – Myke Towers; .MP3 – Emilia; Rayo – J Balvin; Las Mujeres Ya No Lloran – Shakira; El Último Baile – Trueno; Att. – Young Miko	**"La Original" – Emilia & Tini**; "Fría" – Enrique Iglesias & Yotuel; "Si Antes Te Hubiera Conocido" – Karol G; "Imán (Two of Us)" – María Becerra; "Faltas Tú" – Morat; "Déjame Entrar" – Rauw Alejandro
Best Video	Best Live Act
**"Touching the Sky" – Rauw Alejandro**; "Aceita" – Anitta; "Si Antes Te Hubiera Conocido" – Karol G; "Poliamoroso" – Guaynaa; "Guay" – Ozuna & Bad Gyal; "Puntería" – Shakira & Cardi B	**Manuel Turizo**; Emilia; Maluma; Myke Towers; Rauw Alejandro; Yandel
Best Collaboration	Best Tour, Festival or Concert (presented by Air Europa)
**"Así es la vida" – Enrique Iglesias & María Becerra**; "Fría" – Enrique Iglesias & Yotuel; "Contigo" – Karol G & Tiësto; "Tengo un Plan (Remix)" – Key Key & Ozuna; "Ohnana (Remix)" – Kapo, Maluma & Ryan Castro ft Farruko & Nicky Jam; "Puntería" – Shakira & Cardi B	**Don Juan World Tour – Maluma**; Nuestro Lugar Feliz Tour – Camilo; Ferxxocalipsis World Tour – Feid; Mañana Será Bonito Tour – Karol G; Los estadios Tour – Morat; La vida es una Tour – Myke Towers
Best Urban Act	Best Urban Song
**Myke Towers**; Eladio Carrión; Feid; Karol G; Rauw Alejandro; Young Miko	**"Santa" – Rvssian, Rauw Alejandro & Ayra Starr**; "Friki" – Gonzy; "La Falda" – Myke Towers; "Real Gangsta Love" – Trueno; "Luna" – Feid & ATL Jacob; "Lollipop" – Darell
Best Urban Collaboration
**"Mi Lova" – Bad Gyal & Myke Towers**; "Xclusivo (Remix)" – Gonzy, Saiko & Arcángel; "La Ranger" – Sech, Justin Quiles, Lenny Tavárez, Dalex & Dímelo Flow featuring Myke Towers; "Santa" – Rvssian, Rauw Alejandro & Ayra Starr; "De Vuelta " – Tiago PZK & Manuel Turizo; "Offline" – Young Miko & Feid
**Golden Music Award**
**Enrique Iglesias**; **Maluma**
