= La Botella =

2024 single by Enrique Iglesias and El Alfa

Single by Enrique Iglesias featuring El Alfa

from the album Final (Vol. 2)
- Released: 29 March 2024
- Length: 3:06
- Label: RCA; Sony Latin
- Songwriters: Enrique Iglesias; Emanuel Herrera Batista; Bruno Hermes Valverde Juarez; Descemer Bueno; Jorge Luis Piloto; Omar Hernandez; Paul F. Irizarry
- Producer: Carlos Paucar

Enrique Iglesias singles chronology
"Space in My Heart" (2024)	"La Botella" (2024)

El Alfa singles chronology
"Sacudelo" (2024)	"La Botella" (2024)	"La Leche Materna" (2024)

"La Botella" is a song by Spanish singer Enrique Iglesias, featuring Dominican rapper El Alfa. It was released by Sony Music Latin and RCA Records on 29 March 2024, and served as the fourth and final single from Iglesias' twelfth studio album Final (Vol. 2).

== Charts ==
=== Weekly charts ===
Weekly chart performance for "La Botella"
Chart (2024)	Peak position
Dominican Republic Pop (Monitor Latino)	4
El Salvador Pop (Monitor Latino)	14
Nicaragua Pop (Monitor Latino)	13
Peru Pop (Monitor Latino)	11
Venezuela Pop (Monitor Latino)	16

== Remix version ==
Weekly chart performance for "La Botella (Remix)"
Chart (2025)	Peak position
Venezuela Pop (Monitor Latino)	15
