= Agora (María Becerra song) =

2024 single by María Becerra

Single by María Becerra
- Language: Spanish; Portuguese
- English title: "Now"
- Released: 12 September 2024
- Genre: Soul; bossa nova
- Length: 2:33
- Label: Warner Latina
- Songwriters: María de los Ángeles Becerra; Xavier Rosero
- Producer: Xavier Rosero "Xross"

María Becerra singles chronology
"Borracha" (2024)	"Agora" (2024)	"Sexo es la Moda" (2024)

Music video
- "Agora" on YouTube

"Agora" (Portuguese for "Now") is a song recorded by Argentine singer María Becerra. It was released on 12 September 2024 through Warner Music Latina as the fourth single from Becerra's upcoming third studio album (2025). Sung in Spanish and Portuguese, the song was written by Becerra and producer Xavier Rosero "Xross". On the soul and bossa nova track, Becerra sings about the regret of a failed relationship, while searching for a second chance.

The black-and-white music video for "Agora", directed by Julian Levy and Lucas Fossati, premiered alongside the song through the singer's YouTube channel. Ten days after its release, Becerra sang "Agora" at a televised performance on Susana Giménez. The song peaked at number three on the Argentina Hot 100 and at number five on the Uruguayan CUD chart, while charting within the top 20 on airplay charts in both countries.

== Background and release ==
María Becerra started working on her third studio album in December 2022, following the release of La Nena de Argentina. "Agora" was one of the first songs to be worked on, and contained five different versions before its official release. In the same month, the single was previewed in an Instagram live, where Becerra sang part of the chorus. After developing the song for a year, she announced in July 2024 that it was finished. Days later, the song began to circulate on the video-sharing app TikTok, and the singer uploaded a video with it in the background. It generated over 200,000 uses in the platform in months. Xavier Rosero "Xross", the co-writer and producer of the track, shared its conception: "'Agora' was born from a game with [Becerra]. We were singing in Portuñol just to have fun for a while. I grabbed all the instruments (bass, guitar, drums, keys and synth) and put together a quick base so [Becerra] could record something on top. She was super happy with her chorus in Portuguese and uploaded it without imagining that it would become something so big".

The release of "Agora" was announced in September 2024 via Becerra's social media accounts, with the caption "AGORA IS COMING". At the beginnings of the month, Becerra shared various snippets of the black-and-white videoclip for "Agora", in which she can be seen dressed as a mermaid singing to the camera. Days after, she revealed the release date for 12 September. It was released through Warner Music Latina, alongside a music video with an elegant and mysterious visual aesthetic. The video was directed by Julian Levy and Lucas Fossati, and produced by Asalto; it features the actor Francisco Romero.

== Composition ==
"Agora" is a soul and bossa nova ballad, which contains influences of rap music. In the song's lyrics, the singer explores the regret of a failed relationship, while searching for a second chance.

== Live performances ==
Becerra performed "Agora" on the television show Susana Giménez on 22 September 2024, with silver lighting and the screen in black-and-white.

== Charts ==
Chart positions for "Agora"
Chart (2024)	Peak position
Argentina (Argentina Hot 100)	3
Argentina Airplay (Monitor Latino)	14
Uruguay (CUD)	5
Uruguay Airplay (Monitor Latino)	9
