= Adiós (María Becerra song) =

- Live version cover

Single by María Becerra

from the album La Nena de Argentina
- Language: Spanish
- English title: "Goodbye"
- Released: 30 March 2023
- Genre: Cumbia
- Length: 2:41
- Label: 300
- Songwriters: María Becerra; Nico Cotton
- Producer: Nico Cotton

María Becerra singles chronology
"Desafiando el Destino" (2023)	"Adiós" (2023)	"Perfecta (Versión 2023)" (2023)

"Adiós" (Spanish for "Goodbye") is a song by Argentine singer-songwriter María Becerra. It was written by Becerra and Nico Cotton and produced by the latter. A live version featuring Argentine cumbia band Ráfaga was released on 30 March 2023, as the fifth single from her second studio album, La Nena de Argentina.

== Background ==
"Adiós" was revealed days prior to its release on 5 December 2022, through Becerra's social media accounts, where the song appeared on the track list for Becerra's then-upcoming sophomore album, La Nena de Argentina. The song was released on 8 December 2022. On 30 March 2023, a live version in collaboration with Argentine cumbia band Ráfaga was released.

== Commercial performance ==
In Argentina, the song debuted at number 59 on the Billboard Argentina Hot 100 during the tracking week of 25 March 2023. On the week of 15 April 2023, the song reached the top ten for the first time at number 9. On its tenth week, the song reached the top five for the first time. The following week on the chart dated 3 June 2023, the song reached a new peak of number 4.

== Music video ==
An official visualized for "Adiós", directed by Julián Levy was released simultaneously with the song on 8 December 2022.

The music video for the live session featuring Ráfaga was released on 16 March 2023

== Live performances ==
Becerra promoted the song at the TikTok awards on 31 January 2023 as a mash up of "Adiós", "Mandamientos" and "Automático". After the release of the live session, "Adiós" was performed with Ráfaga for the first time at music festival Lollapalooza Argentina on 19 March 2023. The song was also performed at the first Billboard Latin Women in Music on 7 May 2023.

== Charts ==
Chart (2023)	Peak position
Argentina (Argentina Hot 100)	4 (Note: Live Version with Ráfaga is credited on full extended chart, but not on Billboard's official chart page.)
Bolivia (Billboard)	21
Bolivia (Monitor Latino)	1
Chile (Monitor Latino)	15
Peru (Billboard)	24
Peru (Monitor Latino)	4
Uruguay (CUD)	18
Uruguay (Monitor Latino)	3

== Release history ==
Release dates for "Adiós"
Region	Date	Format	Version	Label	Ref.
Various	8 December 2022	Digital download; streaming	Original	300 Entertainment	
Various	30 March 2023	Digital download; streaming	Live	300 Entertainment	
