= Wow Wow =

Single by María Becerra featuring Becky G

from the album Animal
- Language: Spanish
- Released: August 26, 2021
- Genre: Reggaeton
- Length: 3:20
- Label: 300 Entertainment
- Songwriters: María de los Ángeles Becerra; Rebbeca Gomez; Enzo Ezequiel Sauthier; Elena Rose
- Producer: Big One

María Becerra singles chronology
"Mi Debilidad" (2021)	"Wow Wow" (2021)	"Mal Acostumbrao" (2021)

Becky G singles chronology
"Only One" (2021)	"Wow Wow" (2021)	"Mal de Amores" (2021)

Music video
- "Wow Wow" on YouTube

"Wow Wow" is a song by Argentine singer-songwriter María Becerra featuring American singer Becky G. It was written by both artists alongside Enzo Sauthier and Elena Rose, and produced by Big One. The song was released on 26 August 2021 as the fifth single from Becerra's debut studio album, Animal.

== Background ==
On 16 August 2021, Becerra revealed the title and anticipated release date for her debut album Animal, a continuation of her first extended play (EP), released in February, Animal, Pt. 1. The song's title was revealed on 23 August along with an announcement of the music video. The song was officially released on 26 August, coinciding with the release of Animal.

== Critical reception ==
Billboard called the song a "hard-knock reggaeton that has female empowerment anthem potential".

== Commercial performance ==
In Argentina, the song debuted at number 45 on the Billboard Argentina Hot 100 for the week of 4 September 2021. In its second week, the song rose 41 spots, to the top 5, at number 4; it eventually reached its peak during its fourth week at number 2, becoming Becerra's highest-charting single since "Qué Más, Pues?" (2021) and Gomez's first top three since her collaboration with Paulo Londra, "Cuando te Besé" (2018). The song spent 37 weeks in total on the chart.

== Music video ==
The music video for "Wow Wow" was directed by Squid and Julián Levy and was released on 26 August 2021, coinciding with the release of \ Animal.

The video begins at an afterparty, in which no men are present (only female dancers and party-goers), and women are passed-out around the room after a night of drinking, including Becerra, who slowly begins waking up and starts the first verse. The first chorus commences the rest of the video's main theme, consisting of Becerra, Gomez and all the girls dancing and singing at an outdoor pool party. Various scenes show the two singers and the crowd of females in various locations around the house and pool, such as when they appear in a trashed living room, the outdoor pool area, and Becerra in a dark hallway performing with several backup dancers. Both singers also appear in some shots together, without dancers, wearing sunglasses and metallic, futuristic outfits as they sing to the camera.

As of 2024, the music video has an accumulated total of over 168 million views on Becerra's official YouTube channel.

== Accolades ==
Awards and nominations for "Wow Wow"
Organization	Year	Category	Result	Ref.
Premios Gardel	2022	Best Urban Collaboration	Nominated	
Premios Tu Música Urbano	2022	New Artist Video of the Year	Nominated	

== Charts ==
=== Weekly charts ===
Chart (2021)	Peak position
Argentina (Argentina Hot 100)	2
Global Excl. US (Billboard)	121
Paraguay (SGP)	21
Spain (PROMUSICAE)	60
Uruguay (Monitor Latino)	12

=== Year-end charts ===
Chart (2022)	Position
Paraguay (Monitor Latino)	83

== Certifications ==
Region	Certification	Certified units/sales
Mexico (AMPROFON)	Gold	70,000^{‡}
Spain (Promusicae)	Gold	30,000^{‡}
^{‡} Sales+streaming figures based on certification alone.
