= Acaramelao =

Single by María Becerra

from the album Animal and the EP Animal, Pt. 1
- Language: Spanish
- Released: 25 February 2021
- Length: 3:05
- Label: 300 Entertainment
- Songwriters: María Becerra; Enzo Sauthier
- Producer: Big One

María Becerra singles chronology
"Animal" (2021)	"Acaramelao" (2021)	"Además de Mí" (2021)

"Acaramelao" (English: "Caramelized") is a song by Argentine singer-songwriter María Becerra. It was written by Becerra and Enzo Sauthier and produced by Big One. The song was released on 25 February 2021 as the second single from her debut studio album, Animal.

The song is featured on the album's first part and extended play (EP) Animal, Pt. 1.

== Background ==
On 22 February 2021 María Becerra revealed the title and released date for her extended play (EP) and first part of her debut album Animal, Pt. 1, in which "Acaramelao" was included. The song was officially released on 25 February 2021 alongside the four track EP.

== Commercial performance ==
In Argentina, the song debuted at number 28 on the Billboard Argentina Hot 100 during the tracking week of 13 March 2021. On its third week, the song entered the top ten. The song reached the top five at number 4 on its seventh week, becoming Becerra's fourth top 5 in the chart. The song would spend 28 weeks on the chart.

== Music video ==
The music video for "Acaramaleo" was directed by Julián Levy and was released on 25 February 2021 simultaneously with the rest of the EP Animal, Pt. 1, including a music video for each track. As of 2024, the song has accumulated over 130 million views on Becerra's official YouTube channel.

== Charts ==
Chart (2021)	Peak position
Argentina (Argentina Hot 100)	4
