= Latin Grammy Award for Best Reggaeton Performance =

- Awarded for: quality vocal or instrumental reggaeton music singles or tracks
- Country: United States
- Presented by: The Latin Recording Academy
- Currently held by: Karol G featuring Feid for "Verano Rosa" (2026)
- Website: latingrammy.com

The Latin Grammy Award for Best Reggaeton Performance is an honor presented annually by the Latin Academy of Recording Arts & Sciences at the Latin Grammy Awards, a ceremony that recognizes excellence and promotes a wider awareness of cultural diversity and contributions of Latin recording artists in the United States and internationally.

According to the category description guide for the 2020 Latin Grammy Awards, the award is for "commercially released singles or tracks (vocal or instrumental) of recordings that contain 51% or more playing time of newly recorded (previously unreleased) material, and 51% playing time of Reggaeton music (as defined by the Urban Committee). It may include a fusion mix of urban styles with other genres as long as “Reggaeton” predominates as the main music character. For solo artists, duos or groups".

The category was first awarded at the 21st Annual Latin Grammy Awards in 2020, with Bad Bunny behind the inaugural winner for his song "Yo Perreo Sola".

== Recipients ==
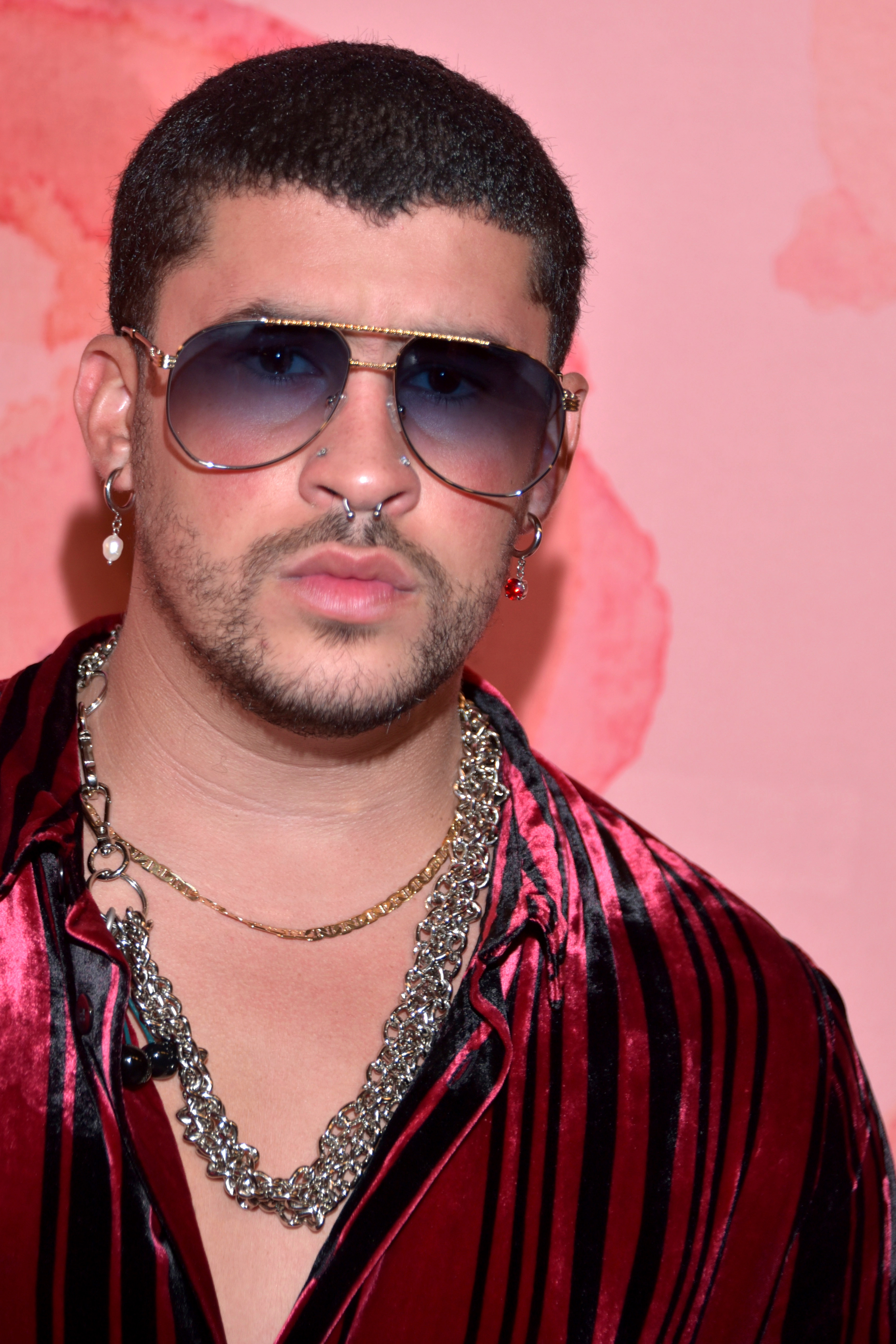
Puerto Rican singer Bad Bunny is the first recipient of the award and is also the most awarded recipient with four wins.

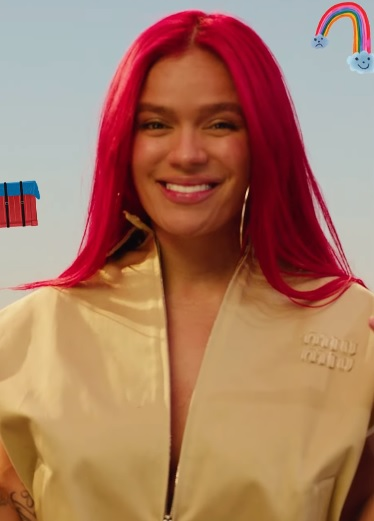
First female recipient and Two-time winner Karol G won in 2021 and 2026.

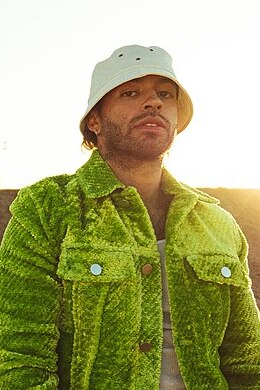
Two-time Winner, Feid

Year	Artist	Work	Nominees	Ref.
2020	Bad Bunny	"Yo Perreo Sola"	J Balvin – "Morado"; DJ Snake and J Balvin featuring Tyga – "Loco Contigo"; Feid and Justin Quiles – "Porfa"; Guaynaa featuring Cauty – "Chicharrón"; Ozuna – "Te Soñé de Nuevo"; Sech and Ozuna – "Si Te Vas"	
2021	Karol G	"Bichota"	J Balvin – "Tu Veneno"; Farruko – "La Tóxica"; Ozuna – "Caramelo"; Jay Wheeler, DJ Nelson & Myke Towers – "La Curiosidad"	
2022	Tainy, Bad Bunny & Julieta Venegas	"Lo Siento BB:/"	Rauw Alejandro & Chencho Corleone – "Desesperados"; Anitta – "Envolver"; Bad Bunny – "Yonaguni"; Bizarrap & Nicky Jam – "Nicky Jam: Bzrp Music Sessions, Vol. 41"	
2023	Tego Calderon	"La Receta"	Maria Becerra – "Automático"; Feid – "Feliz Cumpleaños Ferxxo"; Karol G & Maldy – "Gatúbela"; Ozuna & Feid – "Hey Mor"	
2024	Bad Bunny featuring Feid	"Perro Negro"	Bad Bunny – "Un Preview"; J Balvin featuring Jowell & Randy & De la Ghetto – "Triple S"; Álvaro Díaz featuring Rauw Alejandro – "Byak"; Karol G featuring Peso Pluma – "Qlona"; Kali Uchis featuring Karol G – "Labios Mordidos"	
2025	Bad Bunny	"Voy a Llevarte Pa' PR"	Rauw Alejandro featuring Alexis & Fido – "Baja Pa' Acá"; Nicky Jam – "Dile a Él"; Lenny Tavárez – "Brillar"; Yandel featuring Tego Calderón – "Reggaeton Malandro"	
2026	Karol G featuring Feid	"Verano Rosa"	"Contrabando" – Rauw Alejandro, Wisin & Ñengo Flow; "Choque" – Bad Gyal featuring Chencho Corleone; "Una Aventura" – Ozuna; "Uñas Afiladas" – Sofía Reyes & Luísa Sonza	

== Most Wins ==
4 Wins

- Bad Bunny

==== 2 Wins ====
- Karol G
- Feid

== Most Nominations ==
5 Nominations

- Bad Bunny

4 Nominations

- Karol G
- Ozuna
- J Balvin
- Feid

2 Nominations

- Rauw Alejandro
