= Cazame =

Single by María Becerra with Tiago PZK

from the album Animal
- Language: Spanish
- Released: 10 June 2021
- Length: 3:19
- Label: 300 Entertainment
- Songwriters: María Becerra; Tiago Uriel Pacheco Lezcano
- Producer: Big One

María Becerra singles chronology
"Qué más pues?" (2021)	"Cazame" (2021)	"Bobo" (2021)

Tiago PZK singles chronology
"Házmelo" (2021)	"Cazame" (2021)	"Prende la Cámara" (2021)

"Cazame" (English: "Haunt me") is a song by Argentine singer-songwriter María Becerra and singer-rapper Tiago PZK. It was written by Becerra and Tiago PZK and produced by Big One. The song was released on 10 June 2021 as the third single from Becerra's debut studio album, Animal.

== Background ==
On 6 June 2021, a day prior to the official announcement, María Becerra teased "Cazame" on her social media accounts with an 8-second clip of the music video, showing part of her face and a spider. The following day, Becerra announced the song title and release date. The song was officially released on 10 June 2021.

== Commercial performance ==
In Argentina, the song debuted at number 62 on the Billboard Argentina Hot 100 during the tracking week of 12 June 2021. The following week the song rose 56 spots to its peak at number 6. The song spent 25 weeks on the chart.

== Music video ==
The music video for "Cazame" was directed by Julián Levy and was released simultaneously with the song. As of December 2022, the song has an accumulated a total of 78M views.

== Charts ==
Chart (2021)	Peak position
Argentina (Argentina Hot 100)	6
