= Mi Debilidad =

2021 single by María Becerra

Single by María Becerra

from the album Animal
- Language: Spanish
- English title: "My Weakness"
- Released: 29 July, 2021
- Length: 2:45
- Label: 300
- Songwriter: María Becerra • Big One
- Producer: Big One

María Becerra singles chronology
"Bobo" (2021)	"Mi Debilidad" (2021)	"Wow Wow" (2021)

"Mi Debilidad" (English: "My Weakness") is a song by Argentine singer-songwriter María Becerra. It was written solely by Becerra and produced by Big One. The song was released on 29 July 2021 as the fourth single from her debut studio album, Animal.

== Background ==
Days prior from an official announcement María Becerra teased "Mi Debilidad" on her social media accounts through captions with lyrics of the song and a broken heart emoji. A teaser video from the official music video was also released. On 27 July 2021, the song was officially announced as the next single

Becerra stated: “This July 29 a song that means a lot to me "Mi Debilidad" is going to be released. I wrote it with every part of my heart. It's the only song in which I cried while writing, and it's because its message moves me. The weakness, the dependence that you can feel for someone or something, and for that person to have the power to change your day, your mood, your essence. It is up to each one to have the strength so if in this situation it does not become your greatest weakness.” The song was officially released on 29 July 2021.

== Commercial performance ==
In Argentina, the song debuted at number 26 on the Billboard Argentina Hot 100 during the tracking week of 31 July 2021. The following week the song entered the top 10 at number 9. On its third week the song climbed to number 6 which would eventually be its peak of two weeks. The song spent 36 weeks on the chart.

== Music video ==
The music video for "Mi Debilidad" was directed by Julián Levy and was released simultaneously with the song on 29 July, 2021.

== Charts ==
Chart (2021)	Peak position
Argentina (Argentina Hot 100)	6
