= Desafiando el Destino =

- Live version cover

Single by María Becerra

from the album La Nena de Argentina
- Language: Spanish
- English title: "Defying Fate"
- Released: 12 January 2023
- Length: 3:13
- Label: 300
- Songwriters: María Becerra; Nico Cotton
- Producer: Nico Cotton

María Becerra singles chronology
"La Nena de Argentina" (2022)	"Desafiando el Destino" (2023)	"Adiós" (2023)

"Desafiando el Destino" (Spanish for "Defying Fate") is a song by Argentine singer-songwriter María Becerra. It was written by Becerra and Nico Cotton and produced by the latter. The song was released on 12 January 2023, as the fourth single from her second studio album, La Nena de Argentina.

== Background ==
The song was first teased with a live performance from María Becerra through TikTok in November 2022, alongside other songs from the album, La Nena de Argentina. When the album was released, the song was not included on the track list.

On an interview with Perfil, Becerra reveled that the song would be released later as a bonus track, stating: "We knew that it was a song that would caught the attention of many and they were gonna enjoy it a lot. It’s a very emotional song and video, [so] it's also to maintain the hype for the song." She also described the song as "letter" dedicated to her parents, stating: "I wrote this ballad for my parents. It’s a letter where I express my desire to rebel against destiny when it comes to the people I love. Against the natural order, the cycle of life, the march of time."

"Desafiando el Destino" was announced on 6 January 2023, through Becerra's social media platforms, and released the following week on 12 January 2023.

== Music and lyrics ==
In contrast to Becerra's usual use of trap and reggaetón on her songs, "Desafiando el Destino" is a ballad that incorporates a gospel choir.

Lyrically, the song is about Becerra and her parents Pedro and Irene, whom she is apologizing for not showing an amount of importance. She sings on how she'll go against fate and everything else to show how much she loves them.

== Critical reception ==
Leila Cobo from Billboard praised the song, stating: "María Becerra shows a [more] powerful side in her soulful "Desafiando el destino". The song begins with a slow, piano introduction, which introduces Becerra's voice tinged with melancholy. Touches of a gospel choir tastefully inserted into the simple arrangement add more drama to this beautiful song. Becerra should explore the idea of making more of this material."

Rolling Stone critic Tomás Mier said: "Songs like "Perreo Furioso" and "Mandamientos" tap into the trap-reggaetón Becerra has done throughout her career, but on ballads like "Desafiando el Destino" dedicated to her parents, [Becerra] shows off her specific, yet relatable lyricism."

== Commercial performance ==
In Argentina, the song debuted at number 67 on the Billboard Argentina Hot 100 during the tracking week of 21 January 2023. The song reached a new peak of number 55 on the tracking week of April 8, 2023.

== Music video ==
The music video for "Desafiando el Destino" was directed by Julián Levy and was released simultaneously with the song.

The music video features clips from Becerra's childhood in which her parents and siblings appear.

This material is a recording of Pedro and Irene, to whom María writes this song to.

— Dedication to Becerra's parents on music video.

== Charts ==
Chart (2022–2023)	Peak position
Argentina (Argentina Hot 100)	55

== Release history ==
Release dates for "Desafiando el Destino"
Region	Date	Format	Version	Label	Ref.
Various	12 January 2023	Digital download; streaming	Original	300 Entertainment	
Various	8 May 2023	Digital download; streaming	Live	300 Entertainment	
