= La Nena de Argentina (song) =

Single by María Becerra

from the album La Nena de Argentina
- Language: Spanish
- English title: "The Girl from Argentina"
- Released: 8 December 2022
- Length: 2:32
- Label: 300
- Songwriters: María Becerra; Nico Cotton
- Producer: Nico Cotton

María Becerra singles chronology
"Amigos" (2022)	"La Nena de Argentina" (2022)	"Desafiando el Destino" (2023)

"La Nena de Argentina" (Spanish for "The Girl from Argentina") is a song by Argentine singer-songwriter María Becerra. It was written by Becerra and Nico Cotton and produced by the latter. The song was released on 8 December 2022, as the third single from her second studio album of the same name.

== Background ==
"La Nena de Argentina" was revealed days prior to its release on 5 December 2022, through Becerra's social media accounts, where the song appeared as the final song on the track list. The song was released on 8 December 2022, alongside the release of the album of the same name.

The phrase "La Nena de Argentina" translates from Spanish to "The Girl from Argentina". Becerra explained on the name, stating: "It represents many important things for me, above all, the representation of my country, and that is what fulfills me the most." She added: "Suddenly I see posts like "how nice what our girl from Argentina is achieving". People identify me as a part of the country, I think that is very nice, it is a very beautiful representation. I carry that flag with great pride and much respect." "La Nena de Argentina is my artistic personality and it defines me because I love my country and I want everyone to know that I'm Argentinian".

== Commercial performance ==
In Argentina, the song debuted at number 24 on the Billboard Argentina Hot 100 during the tracking week of 17 December 2022. During its sixth week, the song climbed one spot to a new peak at number 23. The following week the song once again climbed one spot to its peak of 22. On the chart dated 11 February 2023, during its ninth week, the song reached its final peak of number 21.

== Music video ==
The music video for "La Nena de Argentina" was directed by Julián Levy and was released simultaneously with the song on 8 December 2022. The video serves as a direct continuation and culmination for each visualizer that the album had for each track when released.

== Charts ==
Chart (2022–2023)	Peak position
Argentina (Argentina Hot 100)	21
Uruguay (Monitor Latino)	11

== Certifications ==
Region	Certification
Argentina	Platinum
