= Animal (María Becerra and Cazzu song) =

2021 single by Maria Becerra

Single by María Becerra and Cazzu

from the album Animal and the EP Animal, Pt. 1
- Language: Spanish
- Released: 7 January 2021
- Length: 3:23
- Label: 300 Entertainment
- Songwriters: María Becerra; Cazzu; Enzo Sauthier
- Producer: Big One

María Becerra singles chronology
"Aynea (Remix)" (2020)	"Animal" (2021)	"Acaramelao" (2021)

Cazzu singles chronology
"Dándote" (2021)	"Animal" (2021)	"C14TORCE IV" (2021)

"Animal" is a song by Argentine singers María Becerra and Cazzu. It was written by Becerra, Cazzu and Enzo Sauthier, and produced by Big One. The song was released on 7 January 2022 as the lead single from Becerra's debut studio album, Animal.

The song is featured on the album's first part and extended play (EP) Animal, Pt. 1.

== Background ==
On 28 December 2020 María Becerra began teasing the song in her social medias with a series of emojis and photos from the video of "Animal". On 3 January 2021 Becerra announced the release of the song alongside a teaser video for the song. The song was officially released on 7 January of that year.

== Chart performance ==
In Argentina, the song debuted at number 19 on the Billboard Argentina Hot 100 during the tracking week of 16 January 2021. On its third week, the song reached the top ten. The following week, the song reach its final peak at number 5, becoming Becerra's second top 5 in the chart. The song would go on to spend 28 weeks on the chart.

== Music video ==
The music video for "Animal" was directed by Julián Levy and was released simultaneously with the song on 7 January 2021. As of May 2024, the video has accumulated a total of 147 million views on Becerra's official YouTube channel.

== Charts ==
Chart (2022)	Peak position
Argentina (Argentina Hot 100)	5
