= Asi es la Vida (Enrique Iglesias and María Becerra song) =

2023 single by Enrique Iglesias and María Becerra

Single by Enrique Iglesias and María Becerra

from the album Final (Vol. 2)
- Released: 28 September 2023
- Genre: Bachata
- Length: 2:52
- Label: Sony Music Latin
- Songwriters: Enrique Iglesias; Descemer Bueno; Omi Hernandez
- Producer: Carlos Paucar

Enrique Iglesias singles chronology
"Espacio en Tu Corazón" (2022)	"Asi es la Vida" (2023)	"Fría" (2024)

María Becerra singles chronology
"9:45 (Remix)" (2023)	"Asi es la Vida" (2023)	"Piscina" (2023)

Music video
- "Asi es la Vida" on YouTube

"Asi es la Vida" (transl. That's life) is a song by Spanish singer Enrique Iglesias and Argentinian singer María Becerra. It was released by Sony Music Latin on 28 September 2023 as the lead single off Iglesias's twelfth and final album Final (Vol. 2) (2024). The song was produced by Carlos Paucar and mastered by Randy Merrill.

Maxim Bohichik directed the music video, which was released on 5 October 2023, a week after the song had been released.

== Charts ==
Weekly chart performance for "Asi es la Vida"
Chart (2024)	Peak position
Argentina Hot 100 (Billboard)	17
Argentina Airplay (Monitor Latino)	1
Bolivia (Monitor Latino)	5
Chile (Monitor Latino)	18
Colombia (Monitor Latino)	16
Costa Rica (Monitor Latino)	5
Dominican Republic Bachata (Monitor Latino)	8
El Salvador (Monitor Latino)	3
Guatemala (Monitor Latino)	17
Honduras (Monitor Latino)	15
Latin America (Monitor Latino)	3
Mexico (Monitor Latino)	2
Nicaragua Pop (Monitor Latino)	2
Panama (Monitor Latino)	9
Panama (PRODUCE)	11
Paraguay Pop (Monitor Latino)	5
Peru (Monitor Latino)	4
Puerto Rico (Monitor Latino)	16
Romania Airplay (Media Forest)	5
Romania TV Airplay (Media Forest)	8
Spain (PROMUSICAE)	25
Uruguay (Monitor Latino)	8
US Latin Digital Song Sales (Billboard)	9
US Latin Airplay (Billboard)	12
US Tropical Airplay (Billboard)	1
Venezuela (National-Report)	10

=== Year-end charts ===
2023 year-end chart performance for "Asi es la Vida"
Chart (2023)	Position
Argentina Airplay (Monitor Latino)	80
Mexico Pop Airplay (Monitor Latino)	63
Chart (2024)	Position
Argentina Airplay (Monitor Latino)	78
Panama Airplay (Monitor Latino)	97
Romania Airplay (TopHit)	27
Spain (PROMUSICAE)	45
US Latin Airplay (Billboard)	38
US Tropical Songs (Billboard)	6
Chart (2025)	Position
Romania Airplay (TopHit)	112

== Certifications ==
Certifications for "Asi es la Vida"
Region	Certification	Certified units/sales
Mexico (AMPROFON)	Platinum	140,000^{‡}
Spain (Promusicae)	3× Platinum	180,000^{‡}
United States (RIAA)	3× Platinum (Latin)	180,000^{‡}
^{‡} Sales+streaming figures based on certification alone.
