= Fría (song) =

2024 single by Enrique Iglesias and Yotuel

Single by Enrique Iglesias and Yotuel

from the album Final (Vol. 2)
- Released: 1 February 2024
- Length: 2:56
- Label: Sony Music Latin
- Songwriters: Beatriz Luengo González; Cadel González "Kadel"; Christian Tamayo; Enrique Iglesias; Jose Noa "Cundibeatz"; Yotuel Romero
- Producer: Carlos Paucar

Enrique Iglesias singles chronology
"Asi Es La Vida" (2023)	"Fría" (2024)	"Space in My Heart" (2024)

Yotuel singles chronology
"Bendecido" (2023)	"Fría" (2024)

Music video
- "Fría" on YouTube

"Fría" (transl. Cold) is a song by Spanish singer Enrique Iglesias and Cuban singer Yotuel. It was released by Sony Music Latin on 1 February 2024 as the second single off Iglesias' album Final (Vol. 2). The song was produced by Carlos Paucar and mastered by Randy Merrill. An accompanying music video directed by frequent Enrique Iglesias collaborator, Alejandro Pérez, was released alongside the song on 1 February 2024.

== Critical reception ==
In June 2024, music critics from The New York Times included Fría on their list of "The 40 Best Songs of 2024 (So Far)", and described the song's beat as "perfectly infectious".

== Remixes ==
A remix featuring Mexican rapper Yng Lvcas was released on 19 April 2024. A French remix featuring Tiana Da Rocha and a Dutch remix featuring Bizzey were also subsequently released.

== Charts ==
Weekly chart performance for "Fría"
Chart (2024)	Peak position
Argentina Hot 100 (Billboard)	76
Argentina Airplay (Monitor Latino)	6
Bolivia (Monitor Latino)	7
Chile (Monitor Latino)	2
Dominican Republic Pop (Monitor Latino)	10
Ecuador (Monitor Latino)	10
Guatemala (Monitor Latino)	7
Honduras (Monitor Latino)	6
Latin America (Monitor Latino)	6
Lebanon (Lebanese Top 20)	14
Mexico (Monitor Latino)	2
Nicaragua Pop (Monitor Latino)	7
Panama (Monitor Latino)	15
Paraguay Pop (Monitor Latino)	5
Peru (Monitor Latino)	13
Puerto Rico (Monitor Latino)	15
Romania Airplay (Media Forest)	5
Spain Airplay (Monitor Latino)	10
Uruguay (Monitor Latino)	10
US Latin Digital Song Sales	3
US Latin Airplay (Billboard)	15
US Latin Pop Airplay (Billboard)	3
Venezuela Pop (Monitor Latino)	7

=== Year-end charts ===
2024 year-end chart performance for "Fría"
Chart (2024)	Position
Argentina (Monitor Latino)	30
Bolivia (Monitor Latino)	41
Honduras (Monitor Latino)	37
Latin America (Monitor Latino)	85
Mexico (Monitor Latino)	39
Panama (Monitor Latino)	84
Puerto Rico (Monitor Latino)	56
Romania Airplay (TopHit)	93
Spain Airplay (TopHit)	86
US Latin Pop Airplay (Billboard)	7

== Certifications ==
Certifications for "Fría (Remix)"
Region	Certification	Certified units/sales
Spain (Promusicae)	Gold	30,000^{‡}
^{‡} Sales+streaming figures based on certification alone.
