= Animal (María Becerra album) =

2021 studio album by María Becerra

Studio album by María Becerra
- Released: 26 August 2021
- Recorded: 2020–21
- Genre: Reggaeton; latin pop
- Length: 34:26
- Language: Spanish
- Label: 300
- Producer: Big One; Súbelo NEO; Tatool

María Becerra chronology
222 (2019)	Animal (2021)	La Nena de Argentina (2022)

Singles from Animal
- 1. "Animal" Released: 7 January 2021; 2. "Acaramelao" Released: 25 February 2021; 3. "Cazame" Released: 10 June 2021; 4. "Mi Debilidad" Released: 29 July 2021; 5. "Wow Wow" Released: 26 August 2021; 6. "No Eres Tú Soy Yo" Released: 15 October 2021

Animal is the debut studio album by Argentine singer María Becerra. It was released on 26 August 2021 by 300 Entertainment. Animal consists of two parts, with the first half being released as a separate extended play (EP), Animal, Pt. 1 (released in February 2021), consisting of four tracks. The second release coincided with the album, featuring an additional seven songs. The album features collaborations with Cazzu, Tiago PZK, Becky G, and Danny Ocean. Animal was nominated for Best Urban Music Album at the 23rd Annual Latin Grammy Awards.

== Background ==
In September 2020, Becerra confirmed that she had started working on her first studio album, in which collaborations with Argentine artists are coming.

On 25 February 2021, Becerra released Animal, Pt. 1, the extended play preview of what would be her first studio album. It was preceded by two singles between January and February: "Animal" with Argentine singer Cazzu and "Acaramelao"; completing the tracklist with "A Solas" and "Cerquita de Ti".

== Release and cover ==
The cover shows Becerra's hands holding her logo that has the shape of a heart where, metaphorically, the artist delivers her own transparent heart, between strong and fragile but shining for all her audience.

== Singles ==
After the singles "Animal" and "Acaramelao" were released, the third single to be released was "Cazame" along with Argentine singer and rapper Tiago PZK. The music video for the single was filmed on Isla Martín García and directed by Julián Levy, in which Becerra can be seen as an Amazon who meets Tiago after he crashes his plane in the jungle. It reached number 6 on the Billboard Argentina Hot 100 chart. It also reached the 13 position on Monitor Latino in Uruguay.

"Mi Debilidad" was released as the second single from the album on July 29, 2021. After the announcement of the song, the singer shared through her Instagram account:

"I wrote it with every part of my heart. It is the only one song that I cried when writing, and it is because its message mobilizes me. The weakness, the dependency, that you can feel for someone or something, and that it has the power to modify your day, your mood, your essence".

The song reached number 6 on the Billboard Argentina Hot 100 chart.

The third single, released at the same time as the album's release, is titled "Wow Wow" with American singer Becky G. Billboard called the music track "a hitting reggaeton that has female empowerment anthem potential".

== Reception ==
=== Review ===
After four days of its premiere, Billboard Argentina selected Animal as the album of the week. In a positive review, Gabriel Hernando of the newspaper La Nación wrote: "even without too many innovations and preserving both the particular signs and the typical clichés of the urban genre, Animal also appears as a varied, eclectic album".

=== Commercial performance ===
After its release, 9 of the 11 songs on the album entered Spotify Argentina. In total, it accumulated 1.2 million streams in Argentina and more than 2.7 million streams globally. The album also debuted at number five on Spotify's Top 10 Global Album Debuts chart.

In Spain, the album entered at number 49 on the PROMUSICAE chart on 7 September 2021.

== Tour ==
In July 2021 the singer announced "Animal Tour" with three initial shows, scheduled for October 22, 23 and 24, at the Rivadavia Theater in Buenos Aires, which sold out in less than an hour; reason why it announced new presentations, exhausting twenty-two dates. In an interview José Levy, representative of the singer, assured more than 10 functions in Córdoba, Mendoza and other provinces of the country, and soon abroad.

== Track listing ==
Animal track listing
No.	Title	Writer(s)	Producer(s)	Length
1.	"Animal" (with Cazzu)	María Becerra; Julieta Emilia Cazzuchelli; Enzo Sauthier	Big One	3:23
2.	"A Solas"	Becerra; Sauthier	Big One	3:36
3.	"Cerquita de Ti"	Becerra	Big One	3:14
4.	"Acaramelao"	Becerra; Sauthier	Big One	3:05
5.	"Cazame" (with Tiago PZK)	Becerra; Tiago Uriel Pacheco Lezcano	Big One	3:19
6.	"Mi Debilidad"	Becerra	Big One	2:45
7.	"Wow Wow" (featuring Becky G)	Becerra; Sauthier; Rebbeca Marie Gomez; Elena Rose	Big One	3:19
8.	"Hace Rato"	Becerra; Gabriel Rodríguez Morales; Luisette; Randy Class	Subelo NEO	3:13
9.	"Hipnotiza'"	Becerra	Tatool	2:29
10.	"No Eres Tú Soy Yo" (featuring Danny Ocean)	Becerra; Daniel Alejandro Morales Reyes; Sauthier	Big One	3:07
11.	"Episodios"	Becerra	Big One	2:51
Total length:				34:26

Notes

- Track list was labeled and released in two parts:
  - Tracks 1–4 are part of the album's first part and EP, Animal, Pt. 1.
  - Tracks 5–11 are part of the album's second part.

== Personnel ==
Credits adapted from Genius.

- María Becerra – lead vocals
- Cazzu – featured vocals (track 1)
- Tiago PZK – featured vocals (track 5)
- Becky G – featured vocals (track 7)
- Danny Ocean – featured vocals (track 10)
- Big One – production (tracks 1–7, 10–11), mixing, mastering
- Súbelo NEO – production (track 8)
- Tatool – production (track 9)
- Brian Taylor – co-production, engineering

== Charts ==
Chart (2021)	Peak position
Spanish Albums (PROMUSICAE)	49
