= Final (Vol. 2) =

Studio album by Enrique Iglesias
- Released: 29 March 2024
- Length: 30:21
- Language: Spanish; English
- Label: RCA; Sony Music Latin
- Producer: Carlos Paucar; Mark Taylor; Space Primates; RedOne

Enrique Iglesias chronology
Final (Vol. 1) (2021)	Final (Vol. 2) (2024)

Singles from Final
- 1. "Asi Es La Vida" Released: 28 September 2023; 2. "Fría" Released: 1 February 2024; 3. "Space in My Heart" Released: 22 February 2024; 4. "La Botella" Released: 29 March 2024

Final (Vol. 2) is the twelfth and final studio album by Spanish singer Enrique Iglesias. Iglesias announced during a live chat with Ricky Martin and Sebastián Yatra on Instagram on 3 September 2021, that Final would be the final album of his career and that it would be released in two volumes. Volume 1 was released on 17 September 2021.

== Commercial performance ==
Final (Vol. 2) debuted at number 47 on the US Billboard Top Latin Albums and number 6 on the Latin Pop Albums charts selling 3,000 album-equivalent units in its first week.

== Track listing ==
Final (Vol. 2) track listing
No.	Title	Writer(s)	Producer(s)	Length
1.	"Asi Es La Vida" (with María Becerra)	Enrique Iglesias; Descemer Bueno; Omi Hernández	Carlos Paucar	2:52
2.	"Fría" (with Yotuel)	Iglesias; Yotuel Romero; Christian Tamayo; Cadel González "Kadel"; Jose Noa "Cundibeatz"; Beatriz Luengo González	Paucar	2:56
3.	"Space in My Heart" (with Miranda Lambert)	Iglesias; Paucar; Nolan Lambroza; Ross Golan; Simon Wilcox	Paucar; Mark Taylor	2:58
4.	"La Botella" (featuring El Alfa)	Iglesias; Emanuel Herrera Batista; Bruno Hermes Valverde Juárez; Bueno; Jorge Luis Piloto; Omar Hernandez; Paul F. Irizarry	Paucar	3:06
5.	"Love and Pain"	Iglesias; Paucar; Adriano Allaverdi; Federico Vindver; Jordan Miller; Marc Sibley; Nathan Cunningham; Marty James	Space Primates	3:17
6.	"Me Voy Acostumbrando"	Iglesias; Paucar; Bueno; Silverio Lozada	Paucar	3:13
7.	"Como Yo"	Iglesias; Paucar; Nadir Khayat; Servando Primera	RedOne; Primera	2:56
8.	"Llórame Un Río" (featuring Belinda)	Iglesias; Belinda Peregrín; Paucar; Bueno; Waldo Mendoza	Paucar	2:45
9.	"Be Together"	Iglesias; Paucar; Jordan Miller; Marc Sibley; Nathan Cunningham; Marty James	Space Primates	3:20
10.	"Espacio en Tu Corazón"	Iglesias; Paucar; Nolan; Golan; Wilcox; Bueno	Paucar	2:58
Total length:				30:21

== Charts ==
Chart performance for Final (Vol. 2)
Chart (2024)	Peak position
Belgian Albums (Ultratop Flanders)	82
Portuguese Albums (AFP)	185
Spanish Albums (Promusicae)	26
Swiss Albums (Schweizer Hitparade)	40
UK Album Downloads (Official Charts)	43
US Latin Pop Albums (Billboard)	6
US Top Latin Albums (Billboard)	47

== Certifications ==
Certifications for Final (Vol. 2)
Region	Certification	Certified units/sales
United States (RIAA)	Gold (Latin)	30,000^{‡}
^{‡} Sales+streaming figures based on certification alone.
