= Ojalá (María Becerra song) =

2022 single by Maria Becerra

Single by María Becerra

from the album La Nena de Argentina
- Language: Spanish
- English title: "Hopefully"
- Released: 1 June 2022
- Length: 2:41
- Label: 300
- Songwriters: María Becerra; Big One
- Producer: Big One

María Becerra singles chronology
"Maléfica" (2022)	"Ojalá" (2022)	"Berlin" (2022)

"Ojalá" (Spanish for "Hopefully") is a song by Argentine singer-songwriter María Becerra. It was written by Becerra and Big One and produced by the latter. The song was released on 1 June 2022, as the lead single from her second studio album, La Nena de Argentina. It was nominated for Best Urban Fusion/Performance at the 24th Annual Latin Grammy Awards.

== Background ==
The idea for "Ojalá" originated when María Becerra described to producer Big One she wanted the song to have a "reggaeton old school flow," to which the producer replied with "Hit, I'll tell you that".

The song was announced on 29 May 2022 through Becerra's social media platforms with the title, release date, and a clip from the music video. "Ojalá" was released on 1 June 2022.

== Commercial performance ==
In Argentina, the song had a 'Hot Shot Debut', debuting at number 3 on the Billboard Argentina Hot 100 during the tracking week of 11 June 2022. On its fifth week, the song would reach its peak of number 2 for three consecutive weeks. The song also reached the top 10 in Uruguay at number 6.

== Music video ==
The music video for "Ojalá" was directed by Julián Levy and was released simultaneously with the song on 1 June 2022.

== Live performances ==
Becerra promoted the song for the first time at the 2022 Premios Tu Música Urbano on 23 June 2022. The song was also performed live at the Windows Gallery Sessions for Amazon Music and published on 28 June 2022. "Ojalá" was also performed as part of her set list for her concert tour, Animal Tour.

== Charts ==
=== Weekly charts ===
Weekly chart performance for "Ojalá"
Chart (2022)	Peak position
Argentina (Argentina Hot 100)	2
Argentina Airplay (Monitor Latino)	6
Argentina Latin Airplay (Monitor Latino)	4
Argentina National Songs (Monitor Latino)	1
Bolivia Latin (Monitor Latino)	11
Paraguay (SGP)	51
Uruguay (Monitor Latino)	6

=== Year-end charts ===
2022 year-end chart performance for "Ojalá"
Chart (2022)	Position
Argentina Airplay (Monitor Latino)	38
Argentina Latin Airplay (Monitor Latino)	29

== Certifications ==
Certifications for "Ojalá"
Region	Certification	Certified units/sales
Mexico (AMPROFON)	Gold	70,000^{‡}
United States (RIAA)	Gold (Latin)	30,000^{‡}
^{‡} Sales+streaming figures based on certification alone.
