= Espacio en Tu Corazón =

2022 single by Enrique Iglesias

Single by Enrique Iglesias

from the album Final (Vol. 2)
- Released: 28 March 2022
- Length: 2:58
- Label: Sony Music Latin
- Songwriters: Enrique Iglesias; Carlos Paucar; Nolan Lambroza; Ross Golan; Simon Wilcox; Descemer Bueno
- Producer: Carlos Paucar

Enrique Iglesias singles chronology
"Te Fuiste" (2022)	"Espacio en Tu Corazón" (2022)	"Asi Es La Vida" (2023)

"Espacio en Tu Corazón" (English: "Space in Your Heart") is a song by Spanish singer Enrique Iglesias. It was released on 28 March 2022 promotionally as the theme song for the telenovela Corazón guerrero. It was later included on Iglesias's twelfth studio album Final (Vol. 2).

== Charts ==
Weekly chart performance for "Espacio en Tu Corazón"
Chart (2022)	Peak position
US Latin Pop Airplay (Billboard)	25

== Remix version ==
Weekly chart performance for "Espacio en Tu Corazón (Remix)"
Chart (2024)	Peak position
Guatemala (Monitor Latino)	12
Paraguay Pop (Monitor Latino)	10

== Space in My Heart ==
"Space in My Heart"

Single by Enrique Iglesias English version with Miranda Lambert

from the album Final (Vol. 2)
- Released: 22 February 2024
- Length: 2:58
- Label: Sony Music Latin
- Songwriters: Enrique Iglesias; Carlos Paucar; Nolan Lambroza; Ross Golan; Simon Wilcox
- Producers: Carlos Paucar; Mark Taylor

Enrique Iglesias singles chronology
"Fría" (2024)	"Space in My Heart" (2024)	"Tamo Bien" (2025)

Miranda Lambert singles chronology
"Strange" (2022)	"Space in My Heart" (2024)

Music video
- "Space in My Heart" on YouTube

"Space in My Heart" is a song by Spanish singer Enrique Iglesias and American singer Miranda Lambert. It was released on 22 February 2024 as the third single, first in English, from Iglesias's album Final (Vol. 2). Its original version was released a year later without Lambert's voice.

=== Background ===
An English language single, "Space in My Heart" was officially announced by Iglesias and Lambert on social media on 12 February 2024. According to Iglesias, he had written the song several years prior to the release and would later reach out to Lambert about appearing on the song.

=== Charts ===
Weekly chart performance for "Space in My Heart"
Chart (2024)	Peak position
Finland (Suomen virallinen radiosoittolista)	41
US Adult Pop Airplay (Billboard)	16
