= ¿Qué Más, Pues? =

2021 single by J Balvin and María Becerra

Single by J Balvin and María Becerra

from the album Jose
- Released: May 27, 2021
- Genre: Neoperreo
- Length: 3:38
- Label: Universal Latino
- Songwriters: José Álvaro Osorio Balvin; María de los Ángeles Becerra; Alejandro Ramirez; Keityn; Jeff Kleinman
- Producers: Jeff Kleinman; Sky Rompiendo

J Balvin singles chronology
"7 de Mayo" (2021)	"¿Qué Más, Pues?" (2021)	"Otro Fili" (2021)

María Becerra singles chronology
"Te Necesito" (2021)	"¿Qué Más, Pues?" (2021)	"Cazame" (2021)

Music video
- "¿Qué Más, Pues?" on YouTube

"¿Qué Más, Pues?" (transl. "What Else Then?") is a song by Colombian singer J Balvin and Argentine singer María Becerra. It was released on May 27, 2021, through Universal Music Latino. The song surpassed 10 million streams on Spotify within days of its release and reached number 1 on the Billboard Argentina Hot 100 chart.

== Background ==
The collaboration was announced by both artists and caused an impact among the people of Argentina as it was announced as a surprise. In an interview with Los 40 Argentina, Becerra said about the song:

“The day we announced it, people were already expecting it a lot (…) I knew it was a long-awaited collaboration. Nobody imagined it, but suddenly the news came out and everyone was there waiting and, besides, the song is incredible. We are both fascinated by the song, the video (…) I know he's going to keep breaking it”.

Just a few hours after its release, the song became a trend reaching the first position in several countries, the singer J Balvin launched the #QueMasPuesChallengue that went viral on TikTok.

== Music video ==
The music video was released the same day the single was released through J Balvin's channel. The video reached 5 million visits in just a few hours, reaching 1 in trends in Argentina, Spain, Colombia, among other countries. The video was directed by José Emilio Sagar and currently exceeds 20 million visits.

== Commercial performance ==
The song debuted at number 4 on the Billboard Argentina Hot 100 chart. After a few weeks on the chart the song reached number 1. The song also reached the top 3 in Spain and the top 10 in Colombia. The song reached the top 20 on the Billboard charts, peaked at number 18 on the Billboard Global 200 chart. It also reached number 16 on the Hot Latin Songs chart.

Just a month after its release, the song was certified a gold record in Argentina equivalent to 10,000 units, the platinum record in Spain for 40,000 units. Within a year of its release, The single certified a diamond record and fourth platinum records in Mexico equivalent to 1,260,000 units, making Becerra the first Argentine artist to have a diamond record in Mexico and the best selling female Argentine singer in Mexico.

== Charts ==
=== Weekly charts ===
Weekly chart performance for "Qué más pues?"
Chart (2021)	Peak position
Argentina Hot 100 (Billboard)	1
Argentina Airplay (Monitor Latino)	4
Bolivia (Monitor Latino)	9
Chile (Monitor Latino)	12
Colombia (National-Report)	8
Colombia (Promúsica)	2
Colombia Airplay (Monitor Latino)	9
Costa Rica (Monitor Latino)	3
Dominican Republic (Monitor Latino)	5
Ecuador (Monitor Latino)	5
Ecuador (National-Report)	6
Global 200 (Billboard)	17
Guatemala (Monitor Latino)	15
Honduras (Monitor Latino)	6
Italy (FIMI)	60
Mexico Streaming (AMPROFON)	3
Mexico (Billboard Mexican Airplay)	27
Nicaragua (Monitor Latino)	16
Panama (Monitor Latino)	18
Panama (PRODUCE)	17
Paraguay (SGP)	8
Paraguay (Monitor Latino)	3
Peru (Monitor Latino)	1
Portugal (AFP)	26
Spain (Promusicae)	2
Switzerland (Schweizer Hitparade)	54
Uruguay (Monitor Latino)	3
US Bubbling Under Hot 100 (Billboard)	23
US Hot Latin Songs (Billboard)	14
Venezuela (Monitor Latino)	7

=== Year-end charts ===
Year-end chart performance for "Qué más pues?"
Chart (2021)	Position
Global 200 (Billboard)	92
Portugal (AFP)	112
Spain (PROMUSICAE)	10
US Hot Latin Songs (Billboard)	36

== Certifications ==
Certifications for "Qué más pues?"
Region	Certification	Certified units/sales
Argentina (CAPIF)	Platinum	20,000^{*}
France (SNEP)	Gold	100,000^{‡}
Italy (FIMI)	Platinum	100,000^{‡}
Mexico (AMPROFON)	Diamond+4× Platinum	1,260,000^{‡}
Portugal (AFP)	Gold	5,000^{‡}
Spain (Promusicae)	6× Platinum	360,000^{‡}
Streaming
Chile (PROFOVI)	Gold	17,081,501
^{*} Sales figures based on certification alone.^{‡} Sales+streaming figures based on certification alone.
