= Imán (Two of Us) =

2024 single by María Becerra

Single by María Becerra
- Language: Spanish; English
- Released: 16 May 2024
- Studio: MXM Studios (Stockholm, Sweden)
- Genre: Pop; urban pop
- Length: 2:02
- Label: Warner Latina
- Songwriters: María de los Ángeles Becerra; Elvira Anderfjärd; Richard Zastenker; Xavier Rosero
- Producers: Liohn; Xavier Rosero "Xross"

María Becerra singles chronology
"Spicy Margarita" (2024)	"Imán (Two of Us)" (2024)	"Low Key" (2024)

Music video
- "Imán (Two of Us)" on YouTube

"Imán (Two of Us)" is a song by Argentine singer María Becerra. It was released through Warner Music Latina on 16 May 2024, as the second single from her upcoming third studio album. Becerra wrote the song alongside Elvira Anderfjärd, Richard Zastenker, and Xavier Rosero "Xross", while the latter and Liohn handled its production. Musically, it is a pop and urban pop track with lyrics about a love interest.

A music video for "Imán (Two of Us)", directed by Julián Levy and Lucas Fossati, was released alongside the song; it sees Becerra and a group of visitors entering a minimalist art gallery where a pop art exhibition is displayed. Becerra performed the song at the Kings and Queens League finale, on Susana Giménez, and on The Kelly Clarkson Show. "Imán (Two of Us)" peaked at number two on the Argentina Hot 100, number 12 in Uruguay, and number 78 in Paraguay.

== Release ==
Becerra announced the release of "Imán (Two of Us)" through her social media accounts on 10 May 2024, six days before its official release date. She also shared a 16-second snippet and the and information about the world premiere. It was released alongside a music video directed by Julián Levy and Lucas Fossati, and produced by Asalto. It sees Becerra introducing into a futuristic and minimalist art gallery where a pop art exhibition is displayed. It sees all the visitors experiment with chewing gum, which has love potion-like effects. "Imán (Two of Us)" was released as the first single from Becerra's upcoming album.

== Composition ==
"Imán (Two of Us)" is a pop and urban pop track with funk guitar riffs. Its bilingual lyrics are a declaration of love directed to a love interest. The song was recorded at MXM Studios in Stockholm, Sweden, with production handled by Liohn and Xross; the latter is the main producer of Becerra's team. In a statement, Becerra said: "I am very happy to finally be able to share this song that we have been slowly showing both live and on my social networks. [...] It was all a journey to this new era that we have been conceiving for some time".

== Live performances ==
Becerra debuted the song at the Kings and Queens League finale on 20 April 2024, alongside the remix to "Spicy Margarita" with American singer Jason Derulo and Canadian singer Michael Bublé. After the release of "Imán (Two of Us)", she performed it on Susana Giménez and on The Kelly Clarkson Show.

== Charts ==
Chart positions for "Imán (Two of Us)"
Chart (2024)	Peak position
Argentina (Argentina Hot 100)	2
Argentina Airplay (Monitor Latino)	1
Paraguay (SGP)	78
Uruguay (CUD)	12
Uruguay Airplay (Monitor Latino)	3
