= La Nena de Argentina =

Studio album by María Becerra
- Released: 8 December 2022
- Genre: Reggaeton; bachata; cumbia; dancehall pop; Latin pop; Latin trap
- Length: 34:29
- Language: Spanish
- Label: 300
- Producer: Nico Cotton; Xross; Big One

María Becerra chronology
Animal (2021)	La Nena de Argentina (2022)	Quimera (2025)

Singles from La Nena de Argentina
- 1. "Ojalá" Released: 1 June 2022; 2. "Automático" Released: 8 September 2022; 3. "La Nena de Argentina" Released: 8 December 2022; 4. "Desafiando el Destino" Released: 12 January 2023; 5. "Adiós" Released: 30 March 2023

La Nena de Argentina (Spanish for The Girl from Argentina) is the second studio album by Argentine singer María Becerra. It was released on 8 December 2022, through 300 Entertainment. Comprising thirteen tracks, the album is primarily a reggaeton record, featuring a diverse range of musical genres, including bachata, cumbia, pop, dancehall pop and trap.

La Nena de Argentina was supported by five singles: "Ojalá", released on 1 June 2022; "Automático", released on 8 September 2022; its title track of the same name released on the same day as the album's release; "Desafiando el Destino", released on 12 January 2023; and "Adiós", released on 30 March 2023.

The recipient of several nominations, La Nena de Argentina songs garnered three nominations at the 24th Annual Latin Grammy Awards, for "Automático" and "Ojalá".

== Background ==
After the release of her debut album, Animal, in 2021, María Becerra embarked on her very first concert tour, the Animal Tour. The following year while still touring, Becerra confirmed that she was working on her second studio album with a release date set for that same year. On 20 February 2022, María Becerra announced "Felices x Siempre", as the lead single for her second studio album. The song was released on 22 February 2022.

On 29 April 2022, Becerra revealed La Nena de Argentina as the official title for her second studio album. Becerra would also reveal that the album would be completely soloist with no collaborators, in contrast to her debut album, which featured multiple artists. On 29 May 2022, Becerra announced the release of "Ojalá". The song was released on 1 June 2022, as the second single. The following month, María Becerra would begin teasing the release of "Automático" through TikTok, and would officially release it on 8 September 2022. Later that same month, Becerra confirmed the exclusion of "Felices x Siempre" from the album and that there would be 12–14 tracks present.

On 28 November 2022, the official cover art for La Nena de Argentina was released. The tracklist for the album was teased each day on Becerra's social media up until the fifth of December when the complete tracklist was revealed. The album was officially released on 8 December 2022.

== Conception ==
On an interview with Out Now, Becerra described the album as "herself", stating: "I wanted it to be me, María, the girl from Argentina, and just go with the flow. This is reflected in my love of making music and my fascination with all genres of music. In these songs, my two sides are exposed; the wilder side, full of sexual tension and seduction, and my sensitive side, where I’m emotional and dramatic." This was also the reason as to why there were no collaborations in the album: "In a world full of collaborations, it’s risky to release a solo album. But, because this is such a personal work, I felt like this was a story better told only by myself."

=== Title ===
The title for the album, La Nena de Argentina, translates from Spanish to The Girl from Argentina. For María Becerra, that name gained meaning after the general public started referring to her as that, after her collaboration with Argentine singer and rapper Cazzu, "Maléfica", in which the phrase is mentioned for the first time. In a later interview, Becerra explained more, stating:

It represents many important things for me, above all, the representation of my country, and that is what fulfills me the most. Suddenly I see posts like "how nice what our girl from Argentina is achieving". People identify me as a part of the country, I think that is very nice, it is a very beautiful representation. I carry that flag with great pride and much respect."

== Release and promotion ==
The album was released on 8 December 2022, through 300 Entertainment. It was released on digital download and streaming.

=== Singles ===
"Ojalá" was released on 1 June 2022, as the lead single from the album. It was promoted at the 2022 Premios Tu Música Urbano and a live video for Windows Gallery Sessions was released. The track would peak inside the top 2 in Argentina and top 10 in Uruguay.

"Automático" was released on 8 September 2022, as the second single from the album. It was performed at the Los40 Music Awards and TikTok awards in 2022 and 2023, respectively. It peaked inside the top 5 in Argentina at number 4 and inside the top 20 of Spain.

"La Nena de Argentina" was released on 8 December 2022, as the third single from the album, the same day as the album's release. It peaked inside the top 25 in Argentina.

"Desafiando el Destino" was released on 12 January 2023, as the fourth single of the album. It was performed at the Fiesta Nacional del Sol San Juan. It peaked inside the top 60 in Argentina. A live version was released on 8 May 2023.

"Adiós" was released on 30 March 2023, as the fifth single from the album with a live version featuring Argentine band Ráfaga. The song peaked inside the top five.

=== Other songs ===
"Felices x Siempre" was released on 2 February 2022 and was intended as the lead single from the album, but was eventually scrapped from the final track list.

=== Live stream ===
On 15 December 2022, Becerra did a 7-hour live stream via YouTube, Twitch, TikTok and Instagram where she promoted the album's release by having special guests including Nico Cotton and Xross, main producers of La Nena de Argentina. She revealed the behind-the-scenes for each track, danced through various challenges and more.

== Accolades ==
Awards and nominations for La Nena de Argentina
Year	Ceremony	Category	Result	Ref.
2023	Premios Gardel	Album of the Year	Nominated	
2023	Premios Gardel	Best Urban Music Album	Nominated	
2023	Premios Juventud	Best Urban Album - Female	Nominated	
2023	Premios Tu Música Urbano	Album of the Year - Female Artist	Nominated	

== Track listing ==
La Nena de Argentina – Standard edition
No.	Title	Writer(s)	Producer(s)	Length
1.	"Perreo Furioso"	María Becerra	Nico Cotton	2:32
2.	"Automático"	Becerra	Cotton	2:55
3.	"Cuando Hacemos el Amor"	Becerra	Cotton	3:34
4.	"Ojalá"	Becerra; Big One	Big One	2:41
5.	"Adiós"	Becerra; Cotton	Cotton	2:41
6.	"Hasta Que la Muerte Nos Separe"	Becerra	Xross	3:27
7.	"Doble Vida"	Becerra	Xross	3:02
8.	"Inspiradora"	Becerra	Cotton	3:00
9.	"Pídelo"	Becerra; Xross	Xross	2:50
10.	"Mandamientos"	Becerra	Xross	2:23
11.	"Nunca Pasará"	Becerra	Cotton	2:53
12.	"La Nena de Argentina"	Becerra; Cotton	Cotton	2:32
Total length:				34:29

La Nena de Argentina – 2023 reissue
No.	Title	Writer(s)	Producer(s)	Length
13.	"Desafiando el Destino"	Becerra; Cotton	Cotton	3:13
Total length:				37:42

== Charts ==
=== Weekly charts ===
Weekly chart performance for La Nena de Argentina
Chart (2022)	Peak position
Spanish Albums (Promusicae)	34

=== Year-end charts ===
Year-end chart performance for La Nena de Argentina
Chart (2023)	Position
Spanish Albums (PROMUSICAE)	86

== Release history ==
Release history and formats for La Nena de Argentina
Region	Date	Format	Label
Various	8 December 2022	Digital download; streaming	300 Entertainment
Argentina	10 April 2023	Vinyl LP	300 Entertainment
Argentina	8 December 2023	CD	300 Entertainment
