= Automático =

2022 single by María Becerra

Single by María Becerra

from the album La Nena de Argentina
- Language: Spanish
- English title: "Automatic"
- Released: 8 September 2022
- Genre: Reggaeton
- Length: 2:55
- Label: 300
- Songwriter: María Becerra
- Producer: Nico Cotton

María Becerra singles chronology
"Discoteka" (2022)	"Automático" (2022)	"Lokita" (2022)

"Automático" (Spanish for "Automatic") is a song by Argentine singer-songwriter María Becerra. It was written by Becerra and produced by Nico Cotton. The song was released on 8 September 2022, as the second single from her second studio album, La Nena de Argentina. It was nominated for Best Reggaeton Performance at the 24th Annual Latin Grammy Awards.

== Background ==
The song was first teased in July 2022, where María Becerra shared through an Instagram live transmission a part of the song. She described the song as an "old school reggaeton" and confirmed that the song would be released in September of that year.

On 5 September 2022, the released date and cover art were revealed through Becerra's social media platforms. The song was released on 8 September 2022.

== Critical reception ==
Jessica Roiz from Billboard stated "Becerra pays homage to old-school reggaeton in her new single".

Alba Navarro from Los 40 commended the song, saying "As [Becerra] stated, this could be one of the best songs she has ever released".

== Commercial performance ==
In Argentina, the song debuted at number 5 on the Billboard Argentina Hot 100 during the tracking week of 25 September 2022. The following week the song would reach a new peak of number 4. On the week of 22 October 2022, the song reached its peak and the top three for the first time at number 3.

== Music video ==
The music video for "Automático", directed by Julián Levy and was released simultaneously with the song on 8 September 2022.

== Live performances ==
Becerra promoted the song at the Los40 Music Awards on 4 November 2022. The song was later performed at the TikTok awards on 31 January 2023. The song was also performed as part of her set list for her concert tour, Animal Tour.

== Charts ==
Chart (2022)	Peak position
Argentina (Argentina Hot 100)	3
Spain (PROMUSICAE)	18
Uruguay (Monitor Latino)	2

== Certifications ==
Certifications for "Automático"
Region	Certification	Certified units/sales
Spain (Promusicae)	Platinum	60,000^{‡}
Mexico (AMPROFON)	Gold	70,000^{‡}
United States (RIAA)	Platinum (Latin)	60,000^{‡}
^{‡} Sales+streaming figures based on certification alone.
