= María Becerra =

Argentine singer-songwriter (born 2000)

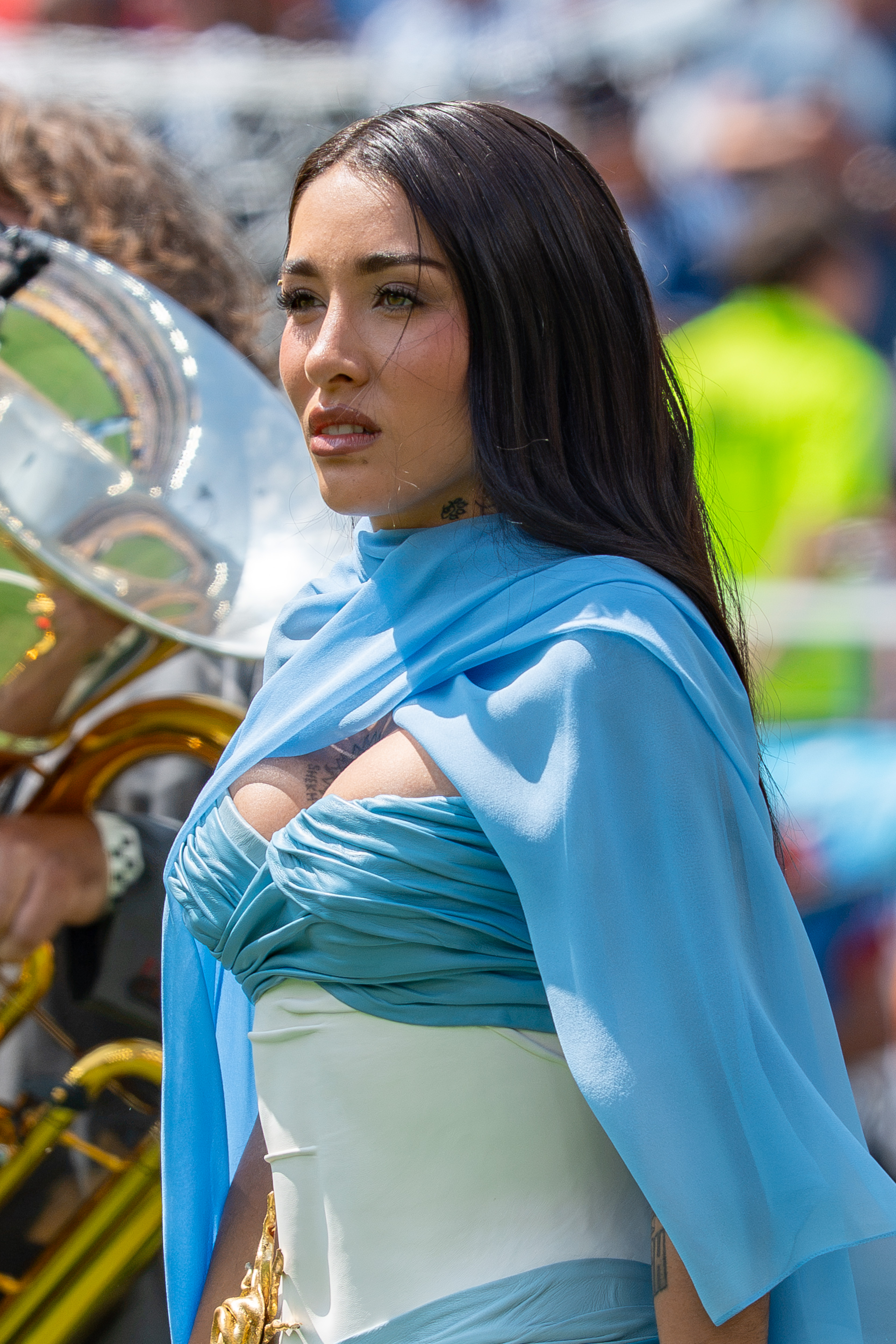
- Becerra singing during the 2026 FIFA World Cup final
- Born: María de los Ángeles Becerra; 12 February 2000 (age 26); Quilmes, Buenos Aires, Argentina
- Occupation: Singer-songwriter
- Years active: 2015–present
- Works: Discography
- Musical career
- Genres: Urban pop; Latin pop
- Instrument: Vocals
- Labels: 300; Warner Latina

YouTube information
- Channel: Maria Becerra
- Years active: 2015–2019
- Subscribers: 3.09 million
- Views: 173 million
- Last updated: 11 May 2026

María de los Ángeles Becerra (born 12 February 2000) is an Argentine singer-songwriter. She has been dubbed as "a leading voice in Argentina's urban pop movement". Becerra has received eight nominations for Latin Grammy Awards, including the category Best New Artist.

Becerra started to gain popularity as a YouTuber, uploading song covers, vlogs, and tutorials. In 2019, she started her musical career with the release of her debut extended play (EP), 222. The remix to the song "High" became Becerra's first top-ten single on the Argentina Hot 100. In 2020, she signed a record deal with 300 Entertainment to release her first studio album, Animal. Becerra featured on the remix to "Además de Mí" in 2021, which became her first number-one single in Argentina, followed by "Miénteme" with Tini, and "¿Qué Más, Pues?" with J Balvin. Becerra's second album, La Nena de Argentina, was released in December 2022 and preceded by the singles "Ojalá" and "Automático". In 2024, she became the first Argentine female singer to perform at the River Plate Stadium. Her third album is scheduled to be released in 2025.

== Early life and career beginnings ==
María de los Ángeles Becerra was born on 12 February 2000 in Quilmes, Buenos Aires, to cardiologist Pedro Becerra and nurse Irene Aletti. She has two older siblings, Juan Manuel and Geraldine, and a younger sister, Aylín. Becerra is of partial Chilean and Mapuche descent; her great-grandmother was Chilean.

Attracted to music from a young age, Becerra began taking singing, musical comedy, dance, and body expression classes between the ages of six and seven at Valeria Lynch's academy. She alternated classes with football training. Her childhood was marked by bullying and violence she suffered in high school. At age 12, she started uploading covers of songs to Facebook and YouTube, along with comedy videos and acting parodies. On the latter platform, one of those videos reached a million views in a few hours, prompting Becerra to devote herself to that for several years. She later became a popular internet celebrity with her comedy, music, and vlog postings.

== Career ==
In 2019, Becerra abandoned her career as a YouTuber and ventured into her musical career. She self-released her debut extended play (EP), 222 in the same year. On the EP, she experimented with urban pop and achieved her first entry on Billboard Argentina's Argentina Hot 100 with the track "Dime Cómo Hago". The release of her single "High" in November 2019 marked "a turning point in her musical career," according to Argentine magazine Clarín. In 2020, Becerra became the first Latin artist to be signed to the indie record label 300 Entertainment. She later released the remix to "High", featuring Argentine singer Tini and Spanish singer Lola Índigo, along with a "minimalist and colorful" music video. It peaked at number two in Argentina, becoming Becerra's highest-charting song at the time. Becerra was dubbed by Billboard as "a leading voice in Argentina’s urban pop movement". Becerra featured on several remixes, including "En Tu Cuerpo" with Lyanno, Rauw Alejandro, and Lenny Tavárez, "AYNEA" with FMK and Beret, and "Además de Mí" with Rusherking, Khea, Duki, Lit Killah, and Tiago PZK; the latter song became Becerra's first number-one single on the Argentina Hot 100.

In 2021, Becerra released her second EP, Animal, Pt. 1, which included the Cazzu-assisted "Animal" and the solo "Acaramelao"; both singles became hits in Argentina, where they peaked at number five and seven, respectively. On the EP, Becerra explored with hip hop, reggaeton, trap, R&B and hints of salsa, and expressed about themes including women empowerment, love and lust. It was the first part of her debut album Animal, produced by Big One, Subelo Neo, and Tatool. In the same year, she collaborated with Tini on "Miénteme", and with Colombian singer J Balvin on "¿Qué Más, Pues?"; both songs topped the Argentina Hot 100 chart, while the latter entered on the Hot Latin Songs chart in the United States. Becerra received a nomination for Best New Artist at the 22nd Annual Latin Grammy Awards.

Becerra appeared on the remix to Tiago PZK and Lit Killah's "Entre Nosotros", alongside Nicki Nicole, released at the beginnings of 2022, which also topped the Argentina Hot 100. They performed the song at the Latin American Music Awards of 2022. She also performed "¿Qué Más, Pues?" with J Balvin at the 64th Annual Grammy Awards on 3 April. She later announced the name of her second studio album, La Nena de Argentina. Preceded by the singles "Ojalá" and "Automático", the album was released on 8 December 2022. It contains songs with several musical genres including bachata, cumbia, pop, trap, reggaeton, and dancehall.

In 2023, Becerra signed with Warner Music Latina and Warner Chappell Music. She also signed with Wasserman Music for representation worldwide except Latin America. The singer performed "Adiós" at the 2023 edition of the Billboard Latin Women in Music annual event, in which she received the Visionary Award. She also received five nominations at the 24th Annual Latin Grammy Awards. As of 14 December 2023, she holds the record for the most entries by a woman on the Argentina Hot 100 with 43.

She became the first Argentine female singer to sell out the Estadio Monumental in Buenos Aires. On the Argentine talk show Susana Giménez, Becerra announced that her upcoming third studio album was "finished and ready to release", and was scheduled to be released at the beginnings of 2025. On 17 October 2024, Becerra was invited to The Kelly Clarkson Show where she performed her single "Imán (Two of Us)". She performed the Argentine National Anthem at the 2026 FIFA World Cup final at the MetLife Stadium in East Rutherford, New Jersey between Spain and Argentina.

== Influences ==
According to Becerra, her major personal influence was her mother. As for her artistic influences, Becerra's work is mostly influenced by Amy Winehouse, Ariana Grande, Shakira, Whitney Houston and Natti Natasha, while she has stated that she always admired Rihanna and Cardi B.

== Personal life ==
Becerra is bisexual. In a 2021 interview for MTV News, she stated:

I feel like I also represent the LGBTQ+ community because I'm bisexual. I love to represent them. I always had it in my head that, if I'm this way, then this is what I'm going to sing about. I'm not only going to make songs about men because I don't only like men. When I understood and accepted that I also liked girls, that was a difficult time. There was a lot of confusion and prejudice, and I had to think about how my family would take it. It was something very heavy that marked my life, so I have a lot of songs about that chapter.

She dated fellow singer Rusherking from 2019 to 2021. In mid-2022, Becerra began a relationship with rapper J Rei, and in July 2023, she proposed to him in Greece. In a 2022 interview, Becerra said that she had been a vegan for about a year and a vegetarian since she was 17. In September 2024, Becerra announced that she had an ectopic pregnancy. In 2025, she had a second ectopic pregnancy.

== Filmography ==
Film roles
Year	Title	Role	Notes
2024	Despicable Me 4	Poppy Prescott	Voice role; Latin Spanish-language dub

Stage roles
Year	Title	Role	Location	Ref.
2017	Original, Laboratorio de Clones	Herself	National tour of Argentina	

== Discography ==
- Animal (2021)
- La Nena de Argentina (2022)
- Quimera (2025)

== Tours ==
=== Headlining ===
- Animal Tour (2021–2023)
- La Nena de Argentina Tour (2023–2024)

== Awards and nominations ==
List of awards and nominations received by María Becerra
Award	Year	Category	Nominated work	Result	Ref.
Fans Choice Awards	2021	Best Female Video	Herself	Nominated	
Fans Choice Awards	2021	Urban Female Artist	Herself	Nominated	
Heat Latin Music Awards	2022	Best Female Artist	Herself	Nominated	
Heat Latin Music Awards	2022	Best Artist South Region	Herself	Nominated	
Heat Latin Music Awards	2022	Best Music Video	"Entre Nosotros (remix)" (with Tiago PZK, Lit Killah and Nicki Nicoles)	Won	
Heat Latin Music Awards	2022	Best Collaboration	"Qué Más Pues?" (with J Balvin)	Nominated	
Heat Latin Music Awards	2024	Best Female Artist	Herself	Nominated	
Heat Latin Music Awards	2024	Best Collaboration	"Los del Espacio" (with Lit Killah, Duki, Emilia, Tiago PZK, FMK, Rusherking & Big One)	Nominated	
Heat Latin Music Awards	2024	Best Music Video	"Así es la Vida" (with Enrique Iglesias)	Nominated	
iHeartRadio Music Awards	2022	Best New Latin Artist	Herself	Nominated	
Kids' Choice Awards	2019	Favorite Latin Musical Influencer	Herself	Nominated	
Kids' Choice Awards Argentina	2017	Favorite YouTuber	Herself	Nominated	
Kids' Choice Awards Argentina	2018	Favorite Musical Influencer	Herself	Won	
Latin American Music Awards	2022	New Artist of the Year	Herself	Won	
Latin American Music Awards	2022	Favorite Video	"Los Tragos" (with Reik)	Nominated	
Latin American Music Awards	2023	Collaboration of the Year	"Te Espero" (with Prince Royce)	Nominated	
Latin American Music Awards	2023	Best Collaboration – Tropical	"Te Espero" (with Prince Royce)	Nominated	
Latin American Music Awards	2024	Best Collaboration – Tropical	"Así es la Vida" (with Enrique Iglesias)	Nominated	
Latin Grammy Awards	2021	Best New Artist	Herself	Nominated	
Latin Grammy Awards	2022	Best Urban Music Album	Animal	Nominated	
Latin Grammy Awards	2023	Album of the Year	La Cuarta Hoja (as songwriter)	Nominated	
Latin Grammy Awards	2023	Song of the Year	"Amigos" (with Pablo Alborán)	Nominated	
Latin Grammy Awards	2023	Best Urban Fusion/Performance	"Ojalá"	Nominated	
Latin Grammy Awards	2023	Best Reggaeton Performance	"Automático"	Nominated	
Latin Grammy Awards	2023	Best Urban Song	"Automático"	Nominated	
Latin Grammy Awards	2024	Best Urban Fusion/Performance	"Corazón Vacío"	Nominated	
Los 40 Music Awards	2021	Best New Latin Act	Herself	Nominated	
Los 40 Music Awards	2022	Best Latin Live Act	Herself	Won	
Los 40 Music Awards	2023	Best Latin Urban Act or Producer	Herself	Nominated	
Los 40 Music Awards	2023	Best Spanish Collaboration	"Amigos" (with Pablo Alborán)	Nominated	
Los 40 Music Awards	2023	Best Latin Video	"Corazón Vacío"	Won	
Los 40 Music Awards	2023	Best Latin Urban Collaboration	"Los del Espacio" (with Lit Killah, Duki, Emilia, Tiago PZK, FMK, Rusherking & Big One)	Nominated	
Martin Fierro Digital Awards	2019	Favorite YouTuber	Herself	Shortlisted	
MTV Europe Music Awards	2021	Best Latin America South Act	Herself	Nominated	
MTV Europe Music Awards	2022	Best Latin America South Act	Herself	Nominated	
MTV Millennial Awards	2019	Argentine Instagrammer of the Year	Herself	Won	
MTV Millennial Awards	2021	Emerging	Herself	Nominated	
MTV Millennial Awards	2022	MIAW Artist	Herself	Nominated	
MTV Millennial Awards	2022	Motomami of the Year	Herself	Nominated	
MTV Millennial Awards	2022	Music Ship of the Year	"Marte" (with Sofía Reyes)	Nominated	
MTV Millennial Awards	2023	Music Ship of the Year	"Los del Espacio" (with Lit Killah, Duki, Emilia, Tiago PZK, FMK, Rusherking & Big One)	Won	
MTV Millennial Awards	2023	La Loba of the Year	Herself	Nominated	
MTV Millennial Awards Brazil	2021	Feat Gringo	"Qué Más Pues?" (with J Balvin)	Nominated	
Premios Gardel	2021	Best Urban/Trap Song or Album	"High (remix)" (with Tini and Lola Índigo)	Nominated	
Premios Gardel	2022	Best Urban Music Album	Animal	Nominated	
Premios Gardel	2022	Record of the Year	"Miénteme" (with Tini)	Nominated	
Premios Gardel	2022	Song of the Year	"Miénteme" (with Tini)	Won	
Premios Gardel	2022	Best Pop Song	"Miénteme" (with Tini)	Won	
Premios Gardel	2022	Best Urban Music Collaboration	"Wow Wow" (with Becky G)	Nominated	
Premios Gardel	2023	Album of the Year	La Nena de Argentina	Nominated	
Premios Gardel	2023	Best Urban Music Album	La Nena de Argentina	Nominated	
Premios Gardel	2023	Best Urban Music Song	"Tranquila" (with FMK)	Nominated	
Premios Gardel	2023	Best Urban Music Collaboration	"Entre Nosotros (remix)" (with Tiago PZK, Lit Killah and Nicki Nicole)	Nominated	
Premios Gardel	2024	Song of the Year	"Corazón Vacío"	Nominated	
Premios Gardel	2024	Song of the Year	"Los del Espacio" (with Lit Killah, Duki, Emilia, Tiago PZK, FMK, Rusherking & Big One)	Nominated	
Premios Gardel	2024	Best Urban Song	"Los del Espacio" (with Lit Killah, Duki, Emilia, Tiago PZK, FMK, Rusherking & Big One)	Nominated	
Premios Gardel	2024	Best Urban Collaboration	"Los del Espacio" (with Lit Killah, Duki, Emilia, Tiago PZK, FMK, Rusherking & Big One)	Won	
Premios Gardel	2024	Record of the Year	"Los del Espacio" (with Lit Killah, Duki, Emilia, Tiago PZK, FMK, Rusherking & Big One)	Nominated	
Premios Gardel	2024	Record of the Year	"Corazón Vacío"	Nominated	
Premios Gardel	2024	Best Urban Pop Song	"Corazón Vacío"	Nominated	
Premios Gardel	2024	Collaboration of the Year	"Perfecta (2023 version)" (with Miranda! & FMK)	Nominated	
Premios Gardel	2024	Best Pop Song	"Perfecta (2023 version)" (with Miranda! & FMK)	Nominated	
Premios Gardel	2024	Best Urban Pop Album	Acoustic Session	Nominated	
Premios Juventud	2021	The New Generation – Female	Herself	Won	
Premios Juventud	2022	Artist of the Youth – Female	Herself	Nominated	
Premios Juventud	2022	Female Artist – On The Rise	Herself	Nominated	
Premios Juventud	2022	Best Girl Power Collab	"Hasta los Dientes" (with Camila Cabello)	Nominated	
Premios Juventud	2022	Viral Track of the Year	"Qué Más Pues?" (with J Balvin)	Nominated	
Premios Juventud	2022	Best Tropical Mix	"Te Espero" (with Prince Royce)	Won	
Premios Juventud	2023	Artist of the Youth – Female	Herself	Nominated	
Premios Juventud	2023	My Favorite Trendsetter	Herself	Nominated	
Premios Juventud	2023	Girl Power	"Lokita" (with Natti Natasha)	Nominated	
Premios Juventud	2023	Social Dance Challenge	"Lokita" (with Natti Natasha)	Nominated	
Premios Juventud	2023	The Hottest Choreography	"Suelta" (with Dímelo Flow, Rauw Alejandro, Farruko, Mr. Vegas & Fatman Scoop)	Nominated	
Premios Juventud	2023	Best Pop/Urban Collaboration	"Suelta" (with Dímelo Flow, Rauw Alejandro, Farruko, Mr. Vegas & Fatman Scoop)	Nominated	
Premios Juventud	2023	Best Pop/Urban Collaboration	"Extasis" (with Manuel Turizo)	Nominated	
Premios Juventud	2023	Best Urban Album – Female	La Nena de Argentina	Nominated	
Premios Juventud	2024	Artist of the Youth – Female	Herself	Nominated	
Premios Juventud	2024	Best Pop/Urban Song	"Corazón Vacío"	Nominated	
Premios Juventud	2024	Best Regional Mexican Fusion	"El Amor de Mi Vida" (with Los Ángeles Azules)	Nominated	
Premios Lo Nuestro	2022	New Artist – Female	Herself	Nominated	
Premios Lo Nuestro	2022	Female Urban Artist of the Year	Herself	Nominated	
Premios Lo Nuestro	2022	Urban/Pop Song of the Year	"Qué Más Pues?" (with J Balvin)	Won	
Premios Lo Nuestro	2023	Female Urban Artist of the Year	Herself	Won	
Premios Lo Nuestro	2023	The Perfect Mix of the Year	"Te Espero" (with Prince Royce)	Nominated	
Premios Lo Nuestro	2023	Tropical Collaboration of the Year	"Te Espero" (with Prince Royce)	Won	
Premios Lo Nuestro	2023	Urban Dance/Pop Song of the Year	"Berlín" (with Zion & Lennox)	Nominated	
Premios Lo Nuestro	2023	Remix of the Year	"Entre Nosotros (remix)" (with Tiago PZK, Lit Killah and Nicki Nicole)	Nominated	
Premios Lo Nuestro	2023	Remix of the Year	"La Ducha (remix)" (with Elena Rose, Greeicy, Becky G and Tini)	Nominated	
Premios Lo Nuestro	2024	Female Urban Artist of the Year	Herself	Nominated	
Premios Lo Nuestro	2024	The Perfect Mix of the Year	"El Amor de Mi Vida" (with Los Ángeles Azules)	Nominated	
Premios Lo Nuestro	2024	Urban/Pop Song of the Year	"Éxtasis" (with Manuel Turizo)	Nominated	
Premios Lo Nuestro	2024	Urban/Pop Collaboration of the Year	"Berlín" (with Zion & Lennox)	Nominated	
Premios Lo Nuestro	2024	Urban Dance/Pop Song of the Year	"Berlín" (with Zion & Lennox)	Nominated	
Premios Lo Nuestro	2024	Urban Album of the Year	La Nena de Argentina	Nominated	
Premios Odeón	2023	Best Latin New Artist	Herself	Won	
Premios Quiero	2020	Best Female Video	"High" (remix) (with Tini and Lola Índigo)	Won	
Premios Quiero	2021	Best Female Video	"Acaramelao"	Nominated	
Premios Quiero	2021	Best Pop Video	"Mienteme" (with Tini)	Nominated	
Premios Quiero	2021	Video of the Year	"Mienteme" (with Tini)	Nominated	
Premios Quiero	2021	Video of the Year	"¿Qué Más Pues?" (with J Balvin)	Nominated	
Premios Quiero	2021	Best Urban Video	"¿Qué Más Pues?" (with J Balvin)	Won	
Premios Quiero	2021	Best Rap / Trap / Hip-Hop Video	"Además de Mí" (remix) (with Rusherking, Tiago PZK, Khea, Lit Killah and Duki)	Won	
Premios Quiero	2021	Best Influencer Musician	Herself	Nominated	
Premios Quiero	2022	Video of the Year	"Automático"	Nominated	
Premios Quiero	2022	Best Female Video	"Automático"	Nominated	
Premios Quiero	2022	Best Pop Video	"OJALA"	Nominated	
Premios Quiero	2022	Best Urban Video	"Berlin" (with Zion & Lennox)	Won	
Premios Quiero	2022	Best Party Video	"Berlin" (with Zion & Lennox)	Won	
Premios Quiero	2022	Best Trap / Rap / Hip-Hop Video	"Entre Nosotros" (remix) (with Tiago PZK, Lit Killah and Nicki Nicole)	Nominated	
Premios Quiero	2022	Best Collaboration	"Marte" (with Sofia Reyes)	Nominated	
Premios Tu Música Urbano	2022	Top Rising Star — Female	Herself	Won	
Premios Tu Música Urbano	2022	Song of the Year	"Qué Más Pues?" (with J Balvin)	Won	
Premios Tu Música Urbano	2022	Song of the Year – Duo or Group	"Mal Acostumbrao" (with Mau y Ricky)	Nominated	
Premios Tu Música Urbano	2022	Album of the Year – Female Artist	Animal	Nominated	
Premios Tu Música Urbano	2022	Video of the Year – New Artist	"Entre Nosotros (remix)" (with Tiago PZK, Lit Killah and Nicki Nicole)	Won	
Premios Tu Música Urbano	2022	Video of the Year – New Artist	"Wow Wow" (with Becky G)	Nominated	
Premios Tu Música Urbano	2022	Video of the Year – New Artist	"Marte" (with Sofia Reyes)	Nominated	
Premios Tu Música Urbano	2022	Video of the Year – New Artist	"Mienteme" (with Tini)	Nominated	
Premios Tu Música Urbano	2022	Collaboration of the Year	"Mienteme" (with Tini)	Nominated	
Premios Tu Música Urbano	2023	Top Artist – Female	Herself	Nominated	
Premios Tu Música Urbano	2023	Song of the Year – Duo or Group	"Berlin" (with Zion & Lennox)	Nominated	
Premios Tu Música Urbano	2023	Album of the Year – Female Artist	La Nena de Argentina	Nominated	
