= 2020s in music =

This article outlines trends in popular music during the 2020s. The early years of the decade were particularly challenging for the music industry, as the COVID-19 pandemic forced widespread concert cancellations and disrupted traditional live performances. In response, video platforms like TikTok quickly rose to prominence, becoming key tastemakers and driving musical trends by launching viral hits. By mid-2023, the industry recorded its highest annual revenue to date ($8.4 billion), partly due to the growth of streaming subscriptions.

== Overview ==
=== Impact of COVID-19 ===
The COVID-19 pandemic resulted in the cancellation or postponement of music-related events scheduled to take place in the early 2020s, including tours, festivals, and television appearances. Due to the restrictions, many artists conducted virtual experiences as an alternative to live events (e.g. Dua Lipa's Studio 2054 and Taylor Swift's Folklore: The Long Pond Studio Sessions). The COVID-19 pandemic had also forced artists to postpone or reschedule tours to at least a year or two from their initially scheduled dates, examples including The Stadium Tour (co-headlined by Mötley Crüe and Def Leppard) and Rage Against the Machine's reunion tour.

=== Impact of social media ===
TikTok emerged as a musical tastemaker for Generation Z and Generation Alpha, shaping their music tastes through viral songs and trends. TikTok's interactive content—such as comedy skits, fan edits, memes, dance routines, and makeup tutorials—helped songs gain popularity as users incorporated them into their videos. While viral success on TikTok didn't always translate to lasting success on the Billboard Hot 100, it had an ability to pull relatively unknown artists out of obscurity. These artists built fanbases and often attracted attention from major labels. TikTok's focus on music, niche communities and pop culture fandoms allowed these artists to thrive within specific subcultures and subgenres.

Strategic collaborations with TikTok creators, sponsored hashtag challenges, and the use of licensed music in viral videos became integral components of contemporary music marketing strategies. The TikTok Billboard chart was created in September 2023 to meet the demand for viral audios from the platform. In 2022, Tik Tok Users embraced a critical reappraisal of shoegaze. This revival, driven by online music communities, also spurred a renewed interest in music from the 1980s and 1990s. The trend reflects a broader cultural shift during the post-pandemic era, where listeners turned to older music.At the same time, micro-genres like rage, hyperpop, plugg, jersey club,and phonk cultivated audience's outside of the mainstream Billboard Hot 100 charts.

=== Trends and statistics ===
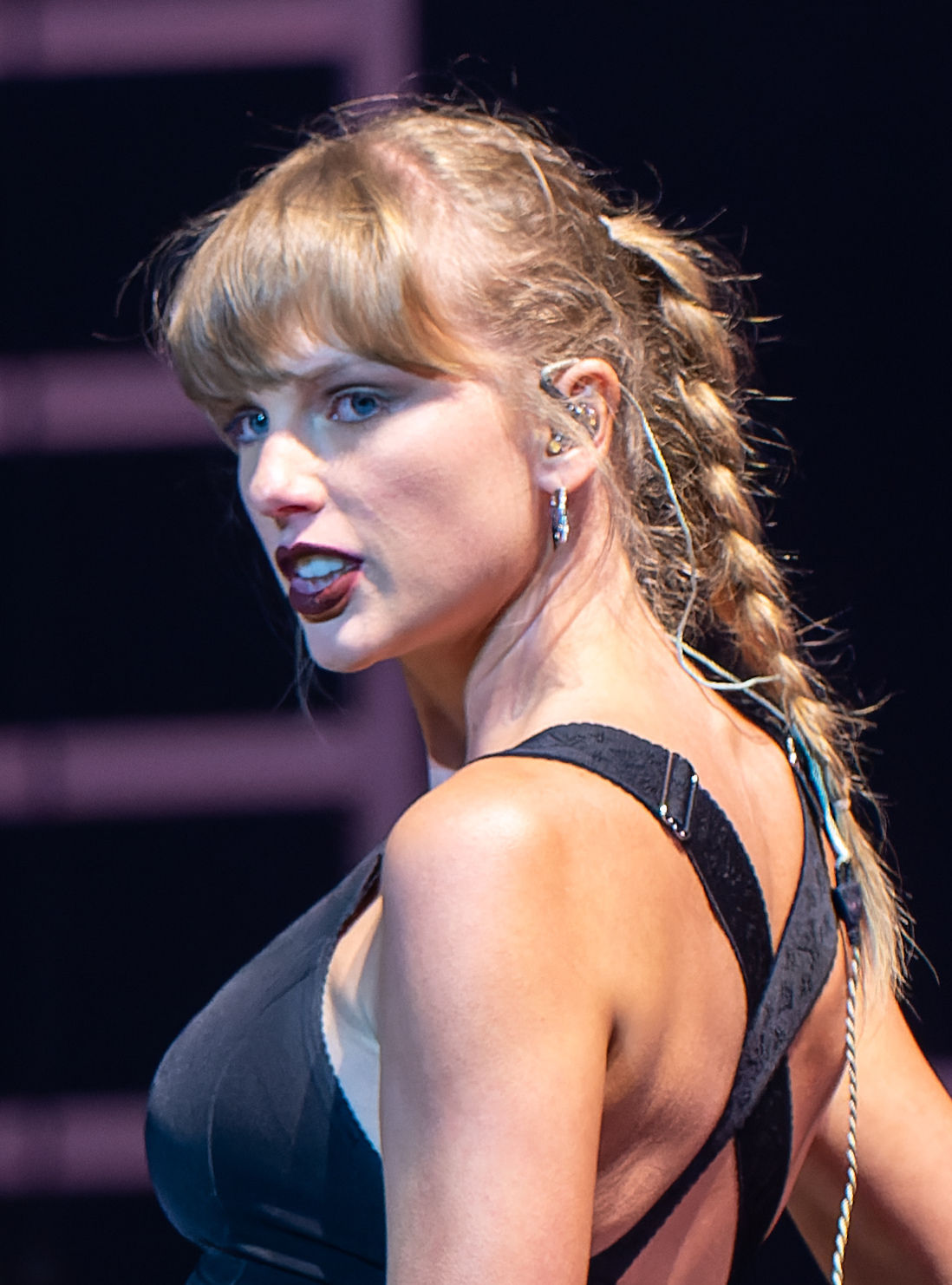
Taylor Swift continued to dominate the global music industry in the 2020s, seeing unprecedented success. She released the million-selling albums Folklore, Evermore, Midnights, 1989 (Taylor's Version), The Tortured Poets Department and The Life of a Showgirl, and embarked on the highest-grossing concert tour of all time.

In 2020, LP records surpassed compact disc (CD) sales for the first time since 1986, LP records 28.7% ($619.6 million) with the rapid decline in CD sales by 23% ($483 million), with 62% ($1.1 billion) of revenue derived from physical music sales across the United States according to the Recording Industry Association of America (RIAA) 2020 Year-End Music Industry Revenue Report.

The 2020s saw the continued impact of streaming on the record industry, a trend that began in the 2010s. Platforms like Spotify played a central role in shaping music trends, driving the success of both mainstream and emerging genres. Social media, particularly TikTok, further amplified music with viral trends, while popular genres like country, pop, hip-hop, r&b, afrobeats and latin music dominated the Billboard Hot 100 charts.

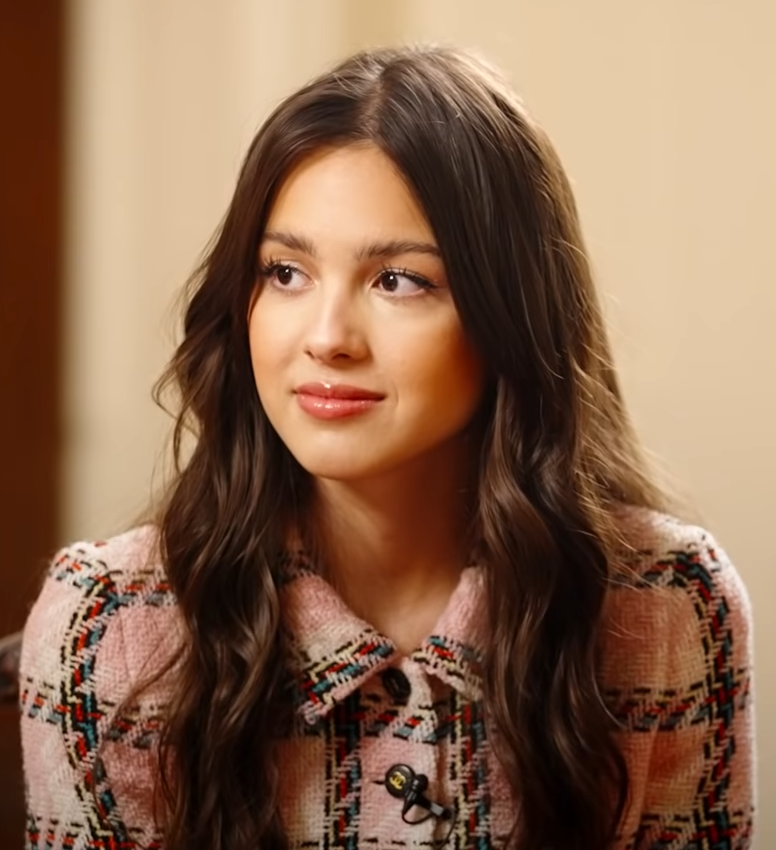
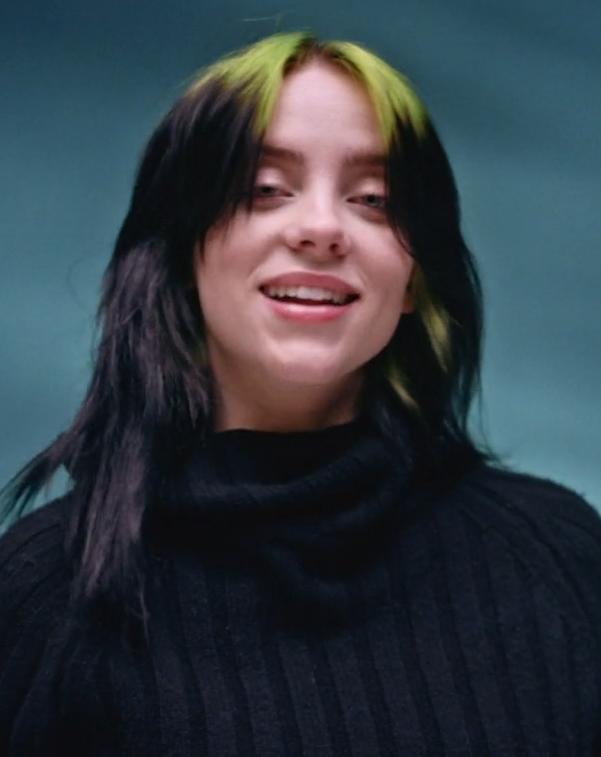
Success of "Good 4 U" by Olivia Rodrigo (pictured left) and "Happier Than Ever" by Billie Eilish (right) indicated pop rock revival.

Media outlets and fans online observed a music trend called "Sad Girl Autumn" or "Sad Girl Fall" in the early 2020s, which refers to the release of melancholic and introspective music by female artists during autumn, such as Swift's Red (Taylor's Version), Adele's 30, Clairo's Sling, Phoebe Bridgers' Punisher, and Mitski's Laurel Hell; it is a counterpart to "Hot Girl Summer", a catchphrase coined by American rapper Megan Thee Stallion with her 2019 song of the same name.

==== Legacy media in music ====
The drive for nostalgia and the desire to return to pre-pandemic life significantly influenced the shift toward older music, particularly in 2022. Data from 2021 and 2022 showed that 70% of music demand was for songs from the past, a trend that continued to grow each year. The top 200 most popular songs accounted for only 5% of total streams, with that percentage halving over the previous three years. While these people had long enjoyed popularity, research indicated that the vast majority of new downloads in 2022 were songs at least two years old.

In the 2020s, Christmas music not only dominated the Billboard charts every December, but it also consistently took over the Top 10, year after year, thanks to streaming. These chart-topping entries were mostly "legacy songs"—holiday tracks that had been around for decades. This included Mariah Carey's "All I Want for Christmas Is You", which repeatedly reached No. 1 and remained in the Top 10 throughout the decade. Streaming platforms like Spotify and Apple Music helped these songs surge in popularity every holiday season, with algorithms favoring nostalgic tracks. The rise of streaming changed how people consumed music, allowing Christmas classics like Carey's hit, Bing Crosby's "White Christmas", and Wham!'s "Last Christmas" to not only chart but dominate the Billboard Top 10 for several years in a row. This shift solidified the presence of Christmas music at the forefront of the holiday season in the 2020s.

In 2023, the music industry recorded its highest revenue of all time, with over $8.4 billion in the first half of 2023. The RIAA reported that the number of people with streaming subscriptions had more than doubled since 2019. The Eras Tour, Swift's sixth headlining concert tour, became a cultural and economic phenomenon as well. Around 2024, AI-generated music created with tools like Udio or Suno became sophisticated and popularized.

==== Drake and Lamar feud ====
The feud between Drake and Kendrick Lamar emerged as a mainstream pop culture event during the mid-2020s, influencing facets of American pop culture. Lamar's diss tracks, particularly "Not Like Us", released in 2024, directly challenged Drake's position in the genre. This came amid the resurfacing of allegations against Drake, including claims of grooming underage fans. In 2024, the rivalry played a role in shaping the Billboard Hot 100 charts. Drake's "Push Ups", "Like That" and Lamar's "Meet the Grahams" alongside "Euphoria" performed well commercially. Drake also faced accusations of cultural appropriation. Drake filed a court petition against his and Lamar's record label, Universal Music Group(UMG), in late 2024. Drake accused the label of artificially inflating Lamar's streaming numbers on Spotify, claiming this made the charts unfair and hurt his position in the music industry. At the 67th Grammy Awards, Kendrick Lamar won the Record of the Year and Song of the Year award for Not Like Us. The song "Not Like Us" saw another resurgence following Kendrick Lamar's halftime performance with SZA, where he performed several diss tracks aimed at Drake.

== North America ==
=== Pop ===
Taylor Swift released two of the best-selling albums of 2020, Folklore and Evermore. Both debuted at number one on the Billboard 200 chart, with their respective lead singles, "Cardigan" and "Willow" doing the same on the Hot 100 chart. Folklore spent a record eight weeks atop the Billboard 200, and won the Album of the Year at the 63rd Annual Grammy Awards. Journalists contextualized both the albums as timely "pandemic projects", exploring the period's struggles through introspective and escapist themes.

Swift released her tenth studio album, Midnights, with the album as well as the lead single "Anti-Hero" spending multiple weeks at number one on their respective Billboard 200 and Billboard Hot 100 charts. Swift became the first artist ever to occupy the Hot 100's entire top 10 simultaneously with "Anti-Hero" at number-one. Midnights went on to win both Album of the Year and Best Pop Vocal Album at the 66th Annual Grammy Awards. Swift's re-recording of her fifth studio album, 1989 (Taylor's Version), was released in 2023. The original album was inspired by 1980s synth pop, and the re-record scored the highest first-week sales of 2023. Swift released her eleventh studio album, The Tortured Poets Department, in 2024, with the album debuting at number one on the Billboard 200 chart. The lead single, "Fortnight", spent multiple weeks at the top of the Billboard Hot 100 chart. Swift released her twelfth studio album, The Life of a Showgirl, in 2025. The album had the highest first-week sales of any album in history, selling over four million copies in its first week. The lead single, "The Fate of Ophelia" spent multiple weeks atop the Billboard Hot 100 chart.

The decade saw the rise of various new artists in pop music. Olivia Rodrigo became the first new pop act to be successful at the advent of the 2020s. She is noted for a revival of pop-rock, along with her diaristic songwriting that is especially relatable to younger generations. Released in 2021, her debut album, Sour spent multiple weeks atop the Billboard 200 chart in 2021. Rodrigo's singles "Drivers License" and "Good 4 U both topped the Billboard Hot 100 in their debut weeks. Rodrigo went on to win Best Pop Solo Performance for "Drivers License", and Best Pop Vocal Album for Sour at the 64th Annual Grammy Awards. The momentum she received the year prior also awarded her with Best New Artist at the ceremony. She released the subsequent rock-influenced albums Guts (2023) and You Seem Pretty Sad for a Girl So in Love (2026) to success.

Sabrina Carpenter had a breakthrough in pop music in 2024 after opening for Swift's Eras Tour. Following the success of her fifth studio album, Emails I Can't Send in 2022, Carpenter began to gain momentum with pop hits like "Nonsense" and "Feather". In 2024, Carpenter released her sixth studio album, Short n' Sweet, with the album debuting at number one on the Billboard 200 chart. The album contained hits "Espresso", "Please Please Please", and "Taste", with all three songs peaking in the top three of the Billboard Hot 100 chart. Carpenter went on to win Best Pop Solo Performance for "Espresso", and Best Pop Vocal Album for Short n' Sweet at the 67th Annual Grammy Awards. In 2025, Carpenter released her seventh studio album, Man's Best Friend, which debuted at number one on the Billboard 200 chart.

Chappell Roan reached newfound success in 2024 following the her single "Good Luck, Babe!". Her debut album, The Rise and Fall of a Midwest Princess included hits "Pink Pony Club", "Red Wine Supernova", and "Hot to Go!". Roan was awarded Best New Artist at the 67th Annual Grammy Awards. In 2025, Roan released singles "The Giver" and "The Subway", with both songs debuting in the top ten of the Billboard Hot 100. "The Subway" was nominated for Best Pop Solo Performance and Song of the Year at the 68th Annual Grammy Awards.

Tate McRae released her debut album I Used to Think I Could Fly in 2022. In 2023, McRae released her single, "Greedy, with the song peaking at number three on the Billboard Hot 100. It was followed by her albums Think Later (2023) and So Close to What (2025). Gracie Abrams released her first two albums, Good Riddance and The Secret of Us, in 2023 and 2024, respectively. After opening for Swift's Eras Tour, Abrams' songs "I Love You, I'm Sorry" and "That's So True" became commercially successful, with the latter reaching the top ten of the Billboard Hot 100 chart. Abrams was nominated for Best New Artist at the 66th Annual Grammy Awards. Olivia Dean released her debut studio album, Messy, in 2023. In 2025, she released her second studio album, The Art of Loving, along with hit singles "Man I Need" and "So Easy (To Fall in Love)". At the 68th Annual Grammy Awards, Dean was awarded Best New Artist.

Miley Cyrus' seventh studio album, Plastic Hearts, was credited as a front-runner to the resurgence of pop-rock music, especially that of the 1970s-1980s. Critics claimed her transition from pop music to rock brought forth a nostalgic feel, one that will seemingly become a trend this decade. Her eighth studio album, Endless Summer Vacation, was preceded by the number one single, "Flowers", which became the fastest song to reach 100 million streams on Spotify within a week. At the 66th Annual Grammy Awards, Cyrus was awarded with Record of the Year and Best Pop Solo Performance for "Flowers", marking her first wins at the ceremony. Cyrus won Best Country Duo/Group Performance at the 67th Annual Grammy Awards for her collaboration with Beyoncé, "II Most Wanted".

Billie Eilish released her second studio album, Happier Than Ever, in 2021. In 2023, Eilish was featured on the Barbie movie soundtrack, with her song "What Was I Made For?". The song gave Eilish her second Academy Award for Best Original Song. In 2024, Eilish released her third studio album, titled Hit Me Hard and Soft. The album featured hits such as "Birds of a Feather" and "Lunch", with both peaking in the top five of the Billboard Hot 100 chart. At the 68th Annual Grammy Awards, Eilish won Song of the Year for single "Wildflower".

Ariana Grande found continued success in the 2020s with her sixth and seventh studio albums, titled Positions and Eternal Sunshine, respectively. Both spent multiple weeks at number one on the Billboard 200 chart. Positions uses heavy 1990s R&B and pop elements, crediting samples from popular artists from that decade, such as Aaliyah. This album spawned the hits "Positions" and "34+35", with the former topping the Billboard Hot 100 chart. Eternal Sunshine gave Grande two more number ones, with "Yes, And?" and "We Can't Be Friends (Wait for Your Love)" At the 68th Annual Grammy Awards, Grande won the award for Best Pop Duo/Group Performance for her version of "Defying Gravity" with Cynthia Erivo from Wicked: The Soundtrack.

Lady Gaga released her sixth studio album, Chromatica, in 2020. The album spawned Billboard Hot 100 number one single "Rain on Me" with Ariana Grande, as well as "Stupid Love", which peaked at number five on the Billboard Hot 100. At the 63rd Annual Grammy Awards, "Rain on Me" won Best Pop Duo/Group Performance. In 2021, Gaga released her second and final collaborative album with Tony Bennett, Love for Sale, which was his last album before his death in 2023. Gaga collaborated with Bruno Mars on number one single "Die with a Smile" in 2024, which won them Best Pop/Duo Group Performance at the 67th Annual Grammy Awards. In 2025, Gaga released her eighth studio album, Mayhem. It debuted at number one on the Billboard 200 chart. At the 68th Annual Grammy Awards, Gaga won Best Pop Vocal Album and Best Dance Pop Recording for Mayhem and single "Abracadabra", respectively.

Dua Lipa became a force in pop music after the success of her second studio album, Future Nostalgia. The album spawned "Don't Start Now" and "Levitating", with both peaking at number two on the Billboard Hot 100. The album went on to win Best Pop Vocal Album at the 63rd Annual Grammy Awards. In 2024, Lipa released her third studio album, Radical Optimism, with the album garnering her highest sales week ever on the Billboard 200 chart. Lizzo released her fourth studio album, Special, and lead single, "About Damn Time", with the latter reaching number one on the Billboard Hot 100. "About Damn Time" went on to win Record of the Year at the 65th Annual Grammy Awards.

Harry Styles garnered his first Billboard Hot 100 number one hit in 2020, "Watermelon Sugar", after the success of his 2019 album, Fine Line. He went on to win the Grammy Award for Best Pop Solo Performance at the 63rd Annual Grammy Awards for the song. In 2022, his third studio album, Harry's House, was released, debuting at number one on the Billboard 200 chart with over half a million sales. The album spawned the singles "As It Was" and "Late Night Talking", with the former remaining at number-one for 15 non-consecutive weeks on the Hot 100. Harry's House went on to win Album of the Year and Best Pop Vocal Album at the 65th Annual Grammy Awards. From 2021 to 2023, Styles embarked on the Love On Tour, which would become one of the highest-grossing concert tours of all time, peaking at number four. In 2026, Styles released the lead single to his fourth studio album, Kiss All the Time. Disco, Occasionally, titled "Aperture", with the song debuting at number one on the Billboard Hot 100.

The Weeknd released his fourth studio album, After Hours. Singles "Blinding Lights" and "Save Your Tears" were commercially successful. "Blinding Lights" went on to become the biggest Billboard Hot 100 song of all time, spending 90 weeks on the chart—the most for any song. "Die for You", a song from his third studio album, Starboy, reached number one on the Billboard Hot 100 chart, seven years after its initial release. "Save Your Tears" and "Die for You" were remixed by Ariana Grande, with both remixed versions becoming commercially successful as well. The Weeknd released his fifth and sixth studio albums, Dawn FM and Hurry Up Tomorrow.

Selena Gomez released her first Spanish-language project, Revelación, in March 2021. It incorporated urbano influences.

=== Hip hop ===
Even though hip hop/rap music saw a noticeable decline in streaming popularity, established artists such as Drake, Tyler The Creator, Nicki Minaj, Kanye West, and Kendrick Lamar maintained their presence with album rollouts that garnered Billboard chart success throughout 2020–2024. Rappers such as Metro Boomin, Post Malone, J Cole, Lil Uzi Vert, Travis Scott, Lil Durk, JID, NLE Choppa, Chris Brown, Lil Baby, 21 Savage, Gunna, Rod Wave, YoungBoy Never Broke Again, Future, and Playboi Carti dominated mainstream hip hop discussions. In 2024, Kendrick Lamar's song "Not Like Us" had a notable impact on the Billboard charts. It entered the Billboard Hot 100 and achieved a high ranking. The track also performed well on various genre-specific charts, such as Billboard's Hip-Hop/R&B Songs chart. Its strong debut and sustained presence on the charts highlighted its popularity and resonance with listeners during that period. Additionally, Kendrick Lamar achieved six number-one hits in 2024.

Late in the 2010s and early 2020s, a generation of artists emerged with party rap music that emphasizes sexual empowerment. Artists such as Megan Thee Stallion, Doechii, Doja Cat, BIA, City Girls, Baby Tate, Saweetie, GloRilla, Sexyy Red, Flo Mili, Lil Nas X, Latto, Rico Nasty, and Ice Spice became prominent hip hop artists. Female rappers achieved widespread popularity and helped create the market for women in the predominantly male mainstream hip-hop genre thanks to their openly sexual lyrics and danceable instrumentation. Megan Thee Stallion had two number one hits in the early half of the decade, including her collaboration with Cardi B titled "WAP" and her hit single "Savage". She released her debut album, Good News. At the 63rd Annual Grammy Awards, Megan was awarded with Best New Artist, and her collaboration with Beyonce on "Savage" won both Best Rap Song and Best Rap Performance. In 2022 and 2024, Megan released her second and third studio albums, Traumazine and Megan, respectively. In 2024, her single, "Hiss", debuted at number one on the Billboard Hot 100 chart.

Doja Cat quickly became one of the best-selling artists of the decade, with her breakthrough in late 2019. Her first number-one single, "Say So", aided this process, as it brought the public's attention to her work. In early 2021, Doja released the lead single "Kiss Me More" to her third studio album, Planet Her. The song peaked at number three on the Billboard Hot 100. After the release of Planet Her, Doja secured two more top-ten hits, with "Need to Know" and "Woman", peaking at number eight and seven, respectively. Planet Her became one of the best-selling albums of the decade, spending 26 weeks in the top 10 of the Billboard 200 chart. Her fourth studio album, Scarlet, debuted at number four on the Billboard 200 chart, and was preceded by the number-one single, "Paint the Town Red".

Doechii reached newfound success in 2024 after the release of her mixtape Alligator Bites Never Heal. The mixtape spawned multiple viral hits, such as "Nissan Altima" and "Denial is a River". At the 67th Annual Grammy Awards, Doechii became the third woman to ever win Best Rap Album, doing so for Alligator Bites Never Heal.

Michigan rap, particularly from Detroit, had a significant influence on hip-hop in the 2020s. Detroit's style, which combined elements of trap and gangsta rap, played a role in shaping both underground and mainstream rap. Artists such as Tee Grizzley, Sada Baby, Babyface Ray, Veeze, Polo G, Icewear Vezzo, Babytron, and 42 Dugg blended street stories with trap-influenced beats, creating a unique sound that resonated across the U.S. Many of these artists appeared on the Billboard Hip-Hop charts, which helped establish Michigan's presence in national hip-hop.

Artists such as JPEGMafia, Clipping, Danny Brown, Run the Jewels, Moor Mother, Jungle Pussy and Genesis Owusu dominated the industrial hip hop scene in the early 2020s. Visions of Bodies Being Burned, the fourth studio album by American hip hop group Clipping, was released on October 23, 2020, through Sub Pop and received positive reviews from music critics.

==== Rage ====
Rage rap, which emerged in the late 2010s and continued into the 2020s, represented a significant shift in the evolution of hip-hop, characterized by high-energy performances and intense, aggressive soundscapes. This subgenre relied on distorted beats, fast tempos, and emotionally charged lyrics to create an atmosphere of chaos and raw aggression. The genre's intensity was reflected in both the production and vocal delivery, with artists pushing boundaries in rhythm, tone, and overall sound.

The development of rage rap was influenced by a blend of underground hip-hop movements, including cloud rap, plugg music, experimental hip-hop, and southern hip-hop, all of which helped shape its unique sonic characteristics. Playboi Carti was a pivotal figure in the rise of rage rap. His 2020 album Whole Lotta Red encapsulated the genre's essence with its high-energy beats and abrasive vocals. Carti's influence extended beyond his music as he became a leader within the Opium label, which played a significant role in the genre's growth. By supporting artists like Destroy Lonely and Ken Carson, Carti helped maintain the genre's momentum. The Opium label itself became a key institution for rage rap, with its distinct "Opium look" reflecting the experimental nature of the music.

Other artists, such as Yeat, Summrs, Nettspend, Rich Amiri, Ian, SoFaygo, 2hollis, OsamaSon, Dom Corleo, Eric Reprid, Che, Yung Fazo, Cochise, TyFontaine, Lancey Foux, and KanKan, also played important roles in defining and diversifying rage rap. While these artists brought their own influences to the genre, they maintained its core principles of intensity, aggression, and chaotic energy, helping rage rap gain wider recognition, particularly in underground hip-hop circles.

=== Contemporary R&B ===
Musicians such as the Weeknd, SZA, Bruno Mars, H.E.R., Bryson Tiller, Muni Long, Summer Walker, Jhené Aiko, Silk Sonic, Victoria Monét, Khalid, Daniel Caesar, Miguel and Chris Brown dominated the 2023 R&B Billboard charts.

SZA released her second studio album, SOS, which became her first number one on the Billboard 200, and spent twelve weeks atop the chart—the most weeks of any female R&B artist since 1986, with Whitney Houston's self-titled album. All of its 23 tracks charted on the Hot 100, becoming the second artist after Swift to chart 20 songs in a single week. One of its singles, "Kill Bill", peaked at number one on the Hot 100 chart, becoming her first song to do so. Another single, "Snooze", reached a new peak of number two on the chart almost ten months after its release. SZA was the recipient of three Grammy awards at the 66th Annual event, including Best Progressive R&B Album for SOS, Best Pop Duo/Group Performance for "Ghost in the Machine" with Phoebe Bridgers, and Best R&B Song for "Snooze". SZA embarked on her first arena tour, the SOS Tour, in 2023. In 2024, SZA released Lana, a reissue of her sophomore album, SOS. The album was preceded by the single "Saturn", which peaked at number six on the Billboard Hot 100 chart. At the 67th Annual Grammy Awards, SZA won Best R&B Song for "Saturn". At the 68th Annual Grammy Awards, SZA won Record of the Year with Kendrick Lamar for their collaboration, "Luther".

Steve Lacy earned his first number-one song on the Billboard Hot 100 with "Bad Habit". At the 65th Annual Grammy Awards, Lacy won Best Progressive R&B Album for his second studio album, Gemini Rights.

Victoria Monét reached newfound success in 2023 after the release of her debut studio album, Jaguar II, a direct follow up to her 2020 EP, Jaguar. Her single "On My Mama" became her highest-charting song on the Billboard Hot 100. Monét was the recipient of Best New Artist at the 66th Annual Grammy Awards, along with Best R&B Album and Best Engineered Album, Non-Classical for Jaguar II.

=== Indie & alternative ===
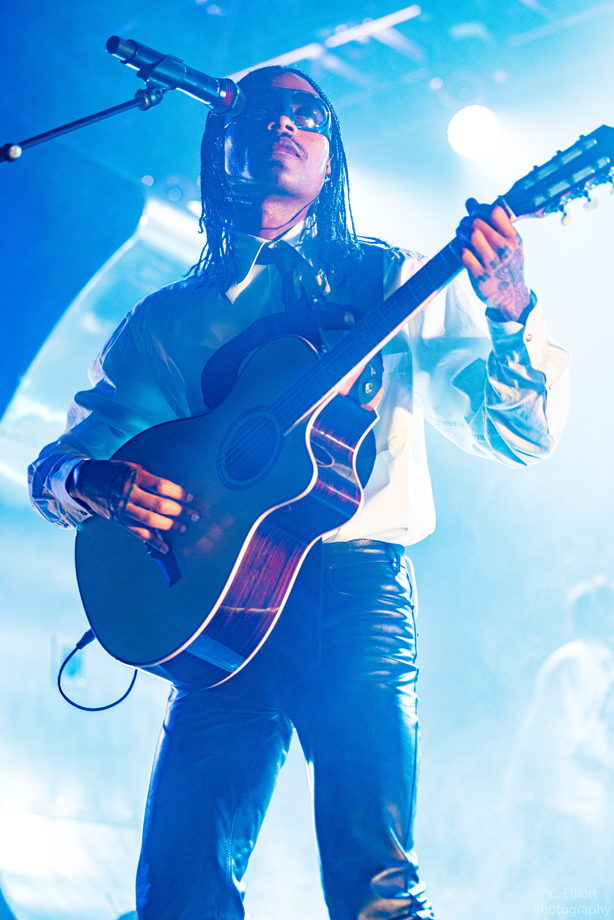
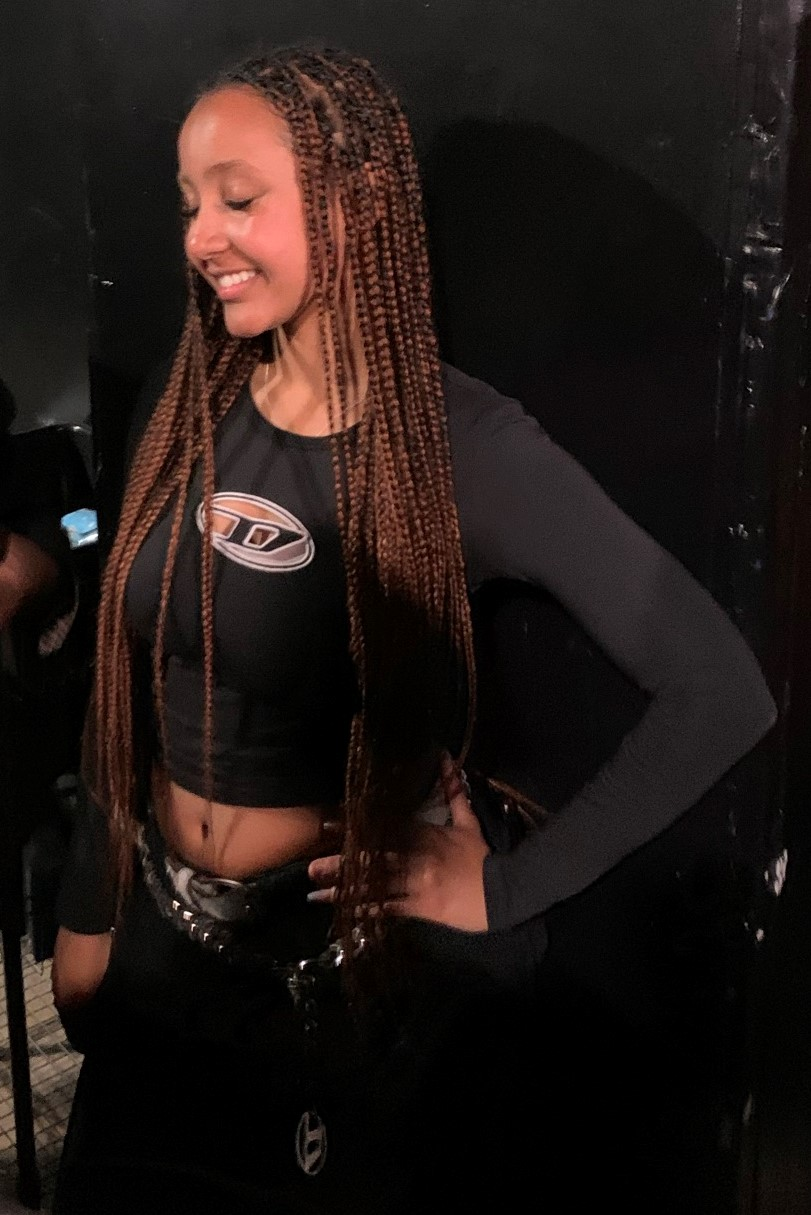
Indie singers Steve Lacy (left) and PinkPantheress (right) garnered their first top-three singles on the Hot 100.

==== Alternative ====
The 2010s saw the rise of "poptimism" within the indie and alternative music scene, a trend that continued into the 2020s. Alternative music audiences embraced alternative artists who incorporated pop production and pop song structures, blending Lofi sensibilities with mainstream appeal. This group of artists exemplifies the blurring of genre lines in the streaming era, where even mainstream acts like Sombr, Malcom Todd, Audrey Hobert, Billie Eilish, Lorde, Melanie Martinez, Lana Del Rey, and Twenty One Pilots are often classified as indie or alternative, despite being signed to major labels and receiving regular airplay on pop radio. Subgenres of indie music such as indie pop, bedroom pop, and sapphic pop remained the culturally dominant subgenres throughout most of the 2020s.

Artists like TV Girl, Alex G, Mitski, Phoebe Bridgers, Clairo,Girl in Red, Tame Impala, Mac Demarco, Steve Lacy, Beabadoobee, and Cavetown became key figures on the Spotify Indie/Alternative charts.

==== Notable alternative acts ====
Lana Del Rey released two folk-inspired studio albums in 2021: Chemtrails over the Country Club and Blue Banisters. Her ninth album, Did You Know That There's A Tunnel Under Ocean Blvd, was released in 2023. The album was nominated for Album of the Year at the 66th Grammy Awards, with single "A&W" being nominated for Song of the Year, among other things.

Lorde ventured into psychedelic folk-pop in her third studio album, Solar Power, an apparent contrast to her previous album Melodrama. This transition from dance pop and electropop into indie and folk-pop has garnered the term "solar powerification", as many other artists have also made this shift. A prominent example includes Carly Rae Jepsen, with her changeover from her disco-infused albums Dedicated and Dedicated Side B into her stripped back, synth-based record The Loneliest Time. Lorde released her fourth studio album, Virgin, in 2025.

Hozier released his third studio album, Unreal Unearth. The album debuted at number three on the Billboard 200, and two of the singles preceding the album, "Eat Your Young" and "Francesca" reached the number one spot on Billboard's Adult Alternative chart. In a reissue of the album, Hozier released the song "Too Sweet", with the song becoming his first number one on the Billboard Hot 100 chart.

Social media expanded the exposure of indie artists for established acts such as Tame Impala, Arctic Monkeys, The 1975, Steve Lacy, Rex Orange County, Mac Demarco, TV Girl, Clairo, Laufey, Girl In Red, Men I Trust, Alex G, Lana Del Rey, Wallows, Beach Bunny, , Boygenius, Beabadoobee, Faye Webster, Her's, Dayglow, Current Joys, The Neighbourhood, Cigarettes After Sex, Joji, Boy Pablo, Beach House, and Mitski to lesser known artists like Black Country, New Road, Ethel Cain, Hemlocke Springs and Black Midi.

Glass Animals' breakout song "Heat Waves" stayed number one on the Billboard Alternative Charts for seven weeks in 2021, making it one of the most successful singles of the year. English singer-songwriter PinkPantheress released her debut mixtape To Hell with It. To Hell with It was named the third best album of 2021 by Time and the fifth best album of the year by The New York Times's Jon Caramanica and Gigwise. Joji's "Glimpse of Us" peaked at number eight on the Billboard Hot 100 chart upon its release, marking the singer-first songwriter's visit to the region. The song, which was released on June 10, 2022, appeared in the Official Singles Chart and also debuting straight inside the top ten of the US Billboard Hot 100.

=== Country ===
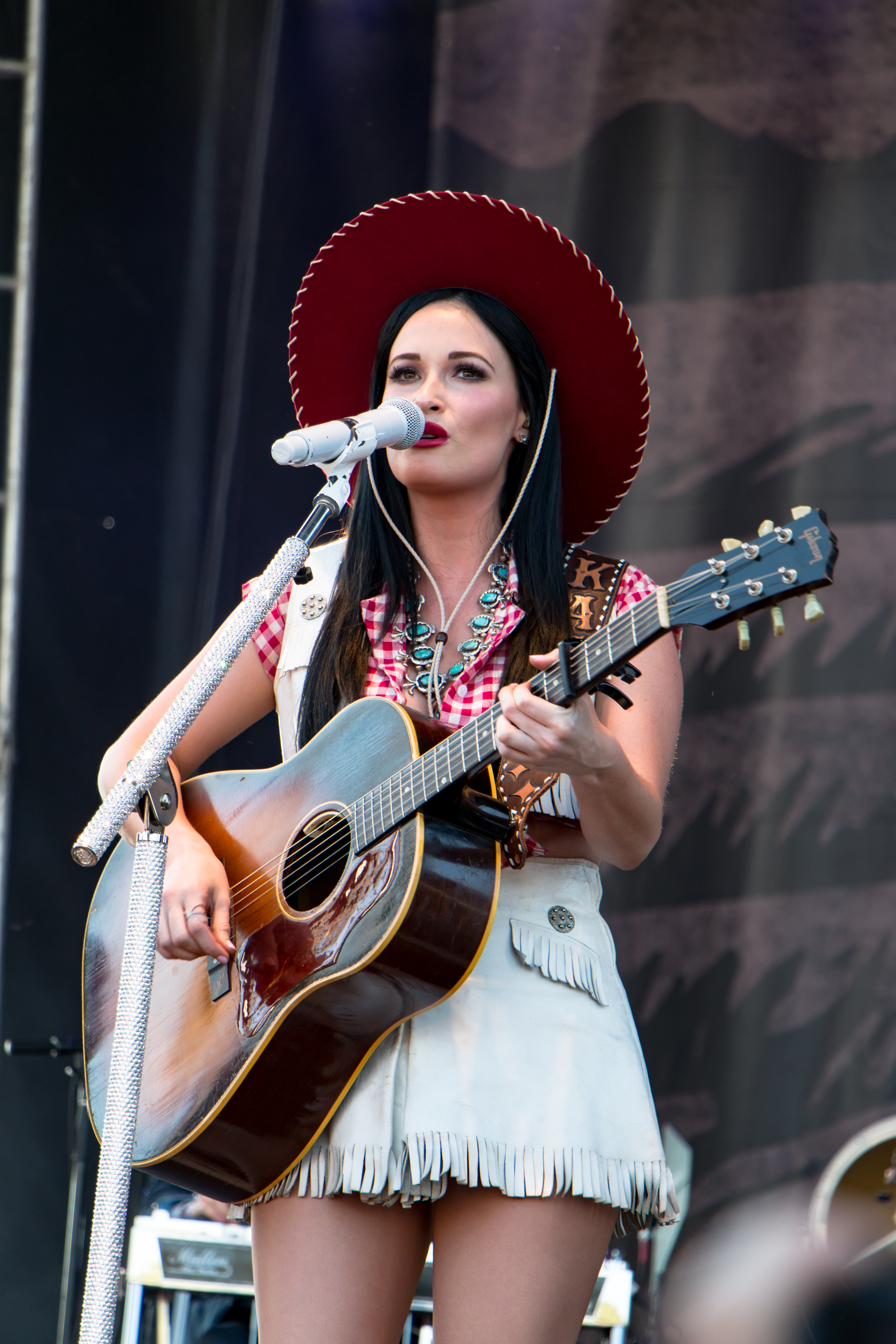
Kacey Musgraves performing at the Pilgrimage Music Festival

==== American country music ====
The Billboard Hot 100 in the early 2020s was dominated by American country music. Luke Combs, Morgan Wallen, Zach Bryan, The Red Clays, Whiskey Myers, Kacey Musgraves, Lainey Wilson, Kane Brown, Shaboozey, Chris Stapleton, Jelly Roll, and Tyler Childers were just a few of the musicians that achieved success outside of the Nashville bubble and found mainstream music.

Dangerous: The Double Album by American country singer Morgan Wallen became the first country album to spend its first four weeks atop the Billboard 200 chart since Shania Twain's Up! did so in January 2003. In 2023, Wallen's One Thing at a Time lead the Billboard 200 for nine consecutive weeks following its release. Having finished third on American Idol, country artist Gabby Barrett released her debut single "I Hope" in 2019. It reached number one on the Billboard Country Airplay chart dated April 25, 2020, and eventually topped the Hot Country Songs chart dated July 25, 2020, making it the first debut single by a female artist to top the latter since 2006.

Swift's re-recordings, Fearless (Taylor's Version) and Red (Taylor's Version), were the top two best-selling country albums of 2021. Her decision to re-record her masters sparked worldwide interest, making Swift the first artist to have a re-recorded album reach number one on the Billboard 200, with Fearless (Taylor's Version). Her second re-recorded album, Red (Taylor's Version) also debuted at number one. The latter included "All Too Well (Taylor's Version)", a non-single at just over ten minutes, that became the longest song in history to chart at number one on the Billboard Hot 100. Her third re-recording, Speak Now (Taylor's Version) was released in 2023 , becoming the most streamed country album in a single day in Spotify history.

Beyoncé released her first country album, Cowboy Carter, in 2024. The album was preceded by number one single "Texas Hold 'Em", and followed up with Miley Cyrus collaboration "II Most Wanted", which reached number six on the Billboard Hot 100. The album sparked controversy, mainly due to a long history of anti-Blackness in the country music industry, resulting in Beyonce receiving zero nominations at the 58th Annual Country Music Association Awards. At the 67th Annual Grammy Awards, Beyonce was the most nominated artist with eleven nominations. She went on to win Album of the Year and Best Country Album for Cowboy Carter, and Best Country Duo/Group Performance for "II Most Wanted".

Country music's crossover appeal continued to grow during the early part of the decade, and it reached its zenith so far in the decade in August 2023, when for the first time since the inception of the all-genre Billboard Hot 100, the top three spots were occupied by country songs. At number one was "Try That in a Small Town" by Jason Aldean, followed by Morgan Wallen's "Last Night" at number two and Luke Combs' "Fast Car". This bested an occurrence that happened twice previously wherein the top two songs on the Hot 100 were country songs: May 31, 1975, by "Before the Next Teardrop Falls" by Freddy Fender and "Thank God I'm a Country Boy" by John Denver; and during a three-week span from February 21 to March 7, 1981, "9 to 5" by Dolly Parton and "I Love a Rainy Night" by Eddie Rabbitt.

Kacey Musgraves' fourth studio album Star-Crossed received attention for its inclusion of disco and dance-pop, but sparked a genre categorization controversy with the Grammy Awards regarding its status as a "country album". Musgraves released her fifth studio album, Deeper Well, with the album marking her highest sales week to date. The album was praised for its return to a more country sound. Musgraves won the Grammy Award for Best Country Song at the 67th Annual Awards for "The Architect".

In 2023, country-folk singer-songwriter Oliver Anthony became the male solo act with the most entries in the history of the top 50 Digital Song Sales in a single week at once while still alive, charting 13 songs simultaneously—Prince and Michael Jackson had exceeded that count only following their deaths.

Some other top chart Country performers of the decade included Warren Zeiders, Riley Green, Ella Langley, Bailey Zimmerman, Megan Moroney, Koe Wetzel, Parker McCollum, Tucker Wetmore, CMAT, Max McNown and Zach Top.

==== Regional Mexican ====
Regional Mexican music began to receive significant mainstream attention in the early 2020s. It was around 2021 that regional Mexican artists began to crack the Billboard 200 charts, marking a significant milestone for the genre as it gained visibility in the broader U.S. music scene, traditionally dominated by English-language music. Artists like Natanael Cano and Peso Pluma played key roles in this shift, incorporating modern sounds like trap and reggaeton into traditional regional Mexican styles.

By 2023, Regional Mexican music experienced an surge in popularity, achieving success on the Billboard Hot 100 and other major charts. Key artists such as Peso Pluma, Junior H, Christian Nodal, Natanael Cano, Eslabon Armado, Fuerza Regida, and Grupo Frontera were at the forefront of this movement. Subgenres of regional Mexican music, including corridos tumbados, sierreño, norteño, and ranchera, made appearances on the Billboard Hot 100 from 2020 to 2024.

The genre's growing presence at music festivals, award shows, and in the media further solidified its importance within the global music landscape. Collaborations between regional Mexican artists and musicians from other genres helped amplify the genre's reach, bringing it to new audiences and reinforcing its growing influence worldwide.

=== Rock ===
==== Soft rock ====
Soft rock is showcased through albums like Haim's Women In Music Pt. III, the album received a nomination for Album of the Year at the 63rd Annual Grammy Awards, making them the first all-female rock band to be nominated for this award. Their single "The Steps" also received a nomination for Best Rock Performance. HAIM released their fourth studio album, I Quit, in 2025, with the album being nominated for Best Rock Album at the 68th Annual Grammy Awards, making them the first all-female group to be nominated for the award.

Boygenius released their debut album, The Record. The Record became the highest-charting album for any of the members thus far, debuting at number one on the UK Album Chart, and number four on the US Billboard 200. The band went on to win three awards at the 66th Annual Grammy Awards, including Best Rock Song and Best Rock Performance for "Not Strong Enough" as well as Best Alternative Music Album for The Record.

==== Hard rock and heavy metal ====
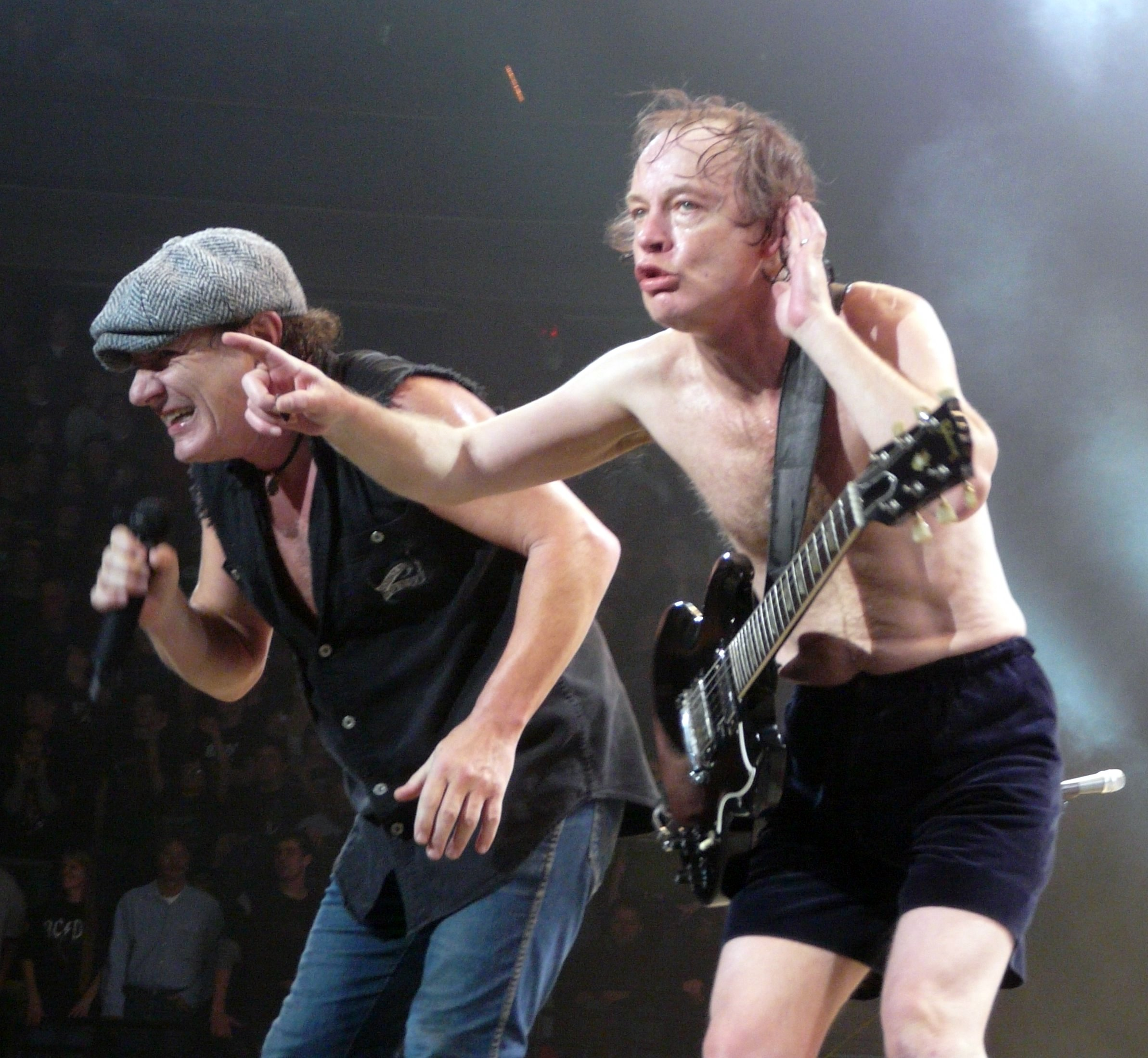
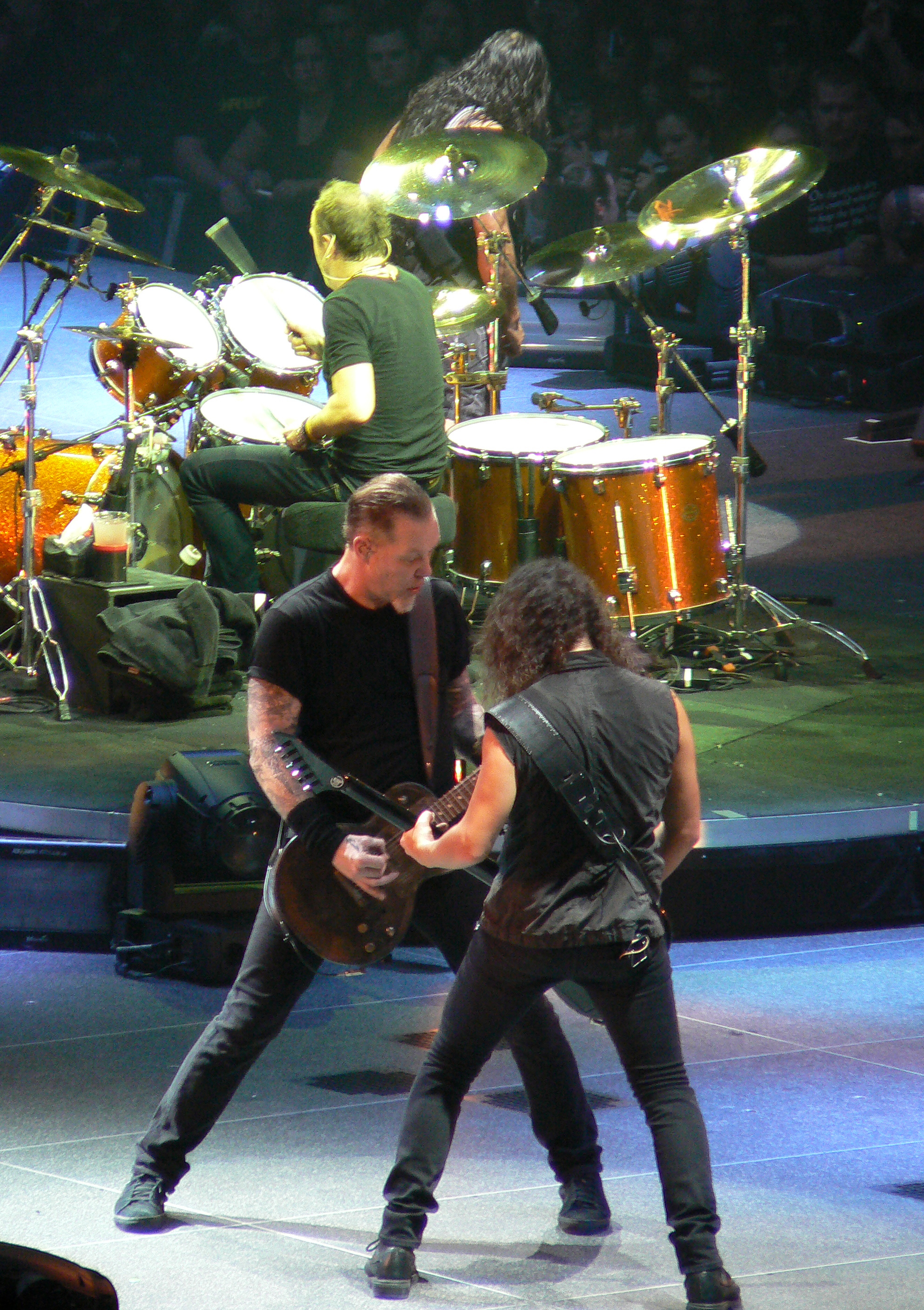
Power Up by AC/DC (pictured left) and 72 Seasons by Metallica were among the successful hard rock and heavy metal albums of the early-to-mid-2020s.

The genres hard rock and heavy metal had both seen resurgences in popularity by the early 2020s. Italian hard rock band Måneskin rose to worldwide prominence following the band's win at the Eurovision Song Contest 2021 with their song "Zitti e buoni". The Four Seasons' "Beggin'" covered by Måneskin reached the top ten on the Billboard Global Excl. U.S. and was ranked 66 in Billboard Year-End Hot 100 chart of 2021.

As of 2026, many hard rock and metal bands who began their careers as far back as the 1970s or 1980s are still active and continue to gain popularity in North America. AC/DC's 2020 album Power Up reached number one on the charts across the globe (including the United States, United Kingdom and their homeland Australia). Iron Maiden earned their first top-five album on the Billboard 200, Senjutsu (2021), for the first time in its 41-year recording career. Two of the "Big Four" of thrash metal acts — Metallica and Megadeth — had albums that debuted within the top 5 on the Billboard 200. Metallica's 2023 album 72 Seasons debuted at number two, becoming their first album in than three decades not to reach number one on the Billboard chart, while Megadeth's 2026 self-titled seventeenth and final studio album became the first and only album in their career to peak at number one. Other veteran bands, including Judas Priest, Def Leppard, Anthrax, Testament, and Dream Theater, also released albums in the 2020s that debuted on the inside of top 100 on the Billboard 200.

Nu metal saw its resurgence and the interest is at its highest since Google Trends started tracking searches in 2004. Deftones, Slipknot, Korn, Limp Bizkit had gone viral on the internet and gained popularity among Generation Z.

==== Punk rock ====
===== Hardcore punk =====
Hardcore punk scene in the early 2020s had commercial and critical success. Turnstile and Knocked Loose were the most popular acts of this wave. Turnstile are the first rock act to join Rolling Loud, and Knocked Loose was booked to play at Coachella.

===== Pop-punk and emo pop =====
The early 2020s have seen a clear resurgence of 2000s emo-pop and pop-punk, which has been embraced by rock music circles. Olivia Rodrigo is a pop artist who incorporated pop-punk elements into her music in the 2020s, and is cited as being very influential on the 2020s pop punk revival.

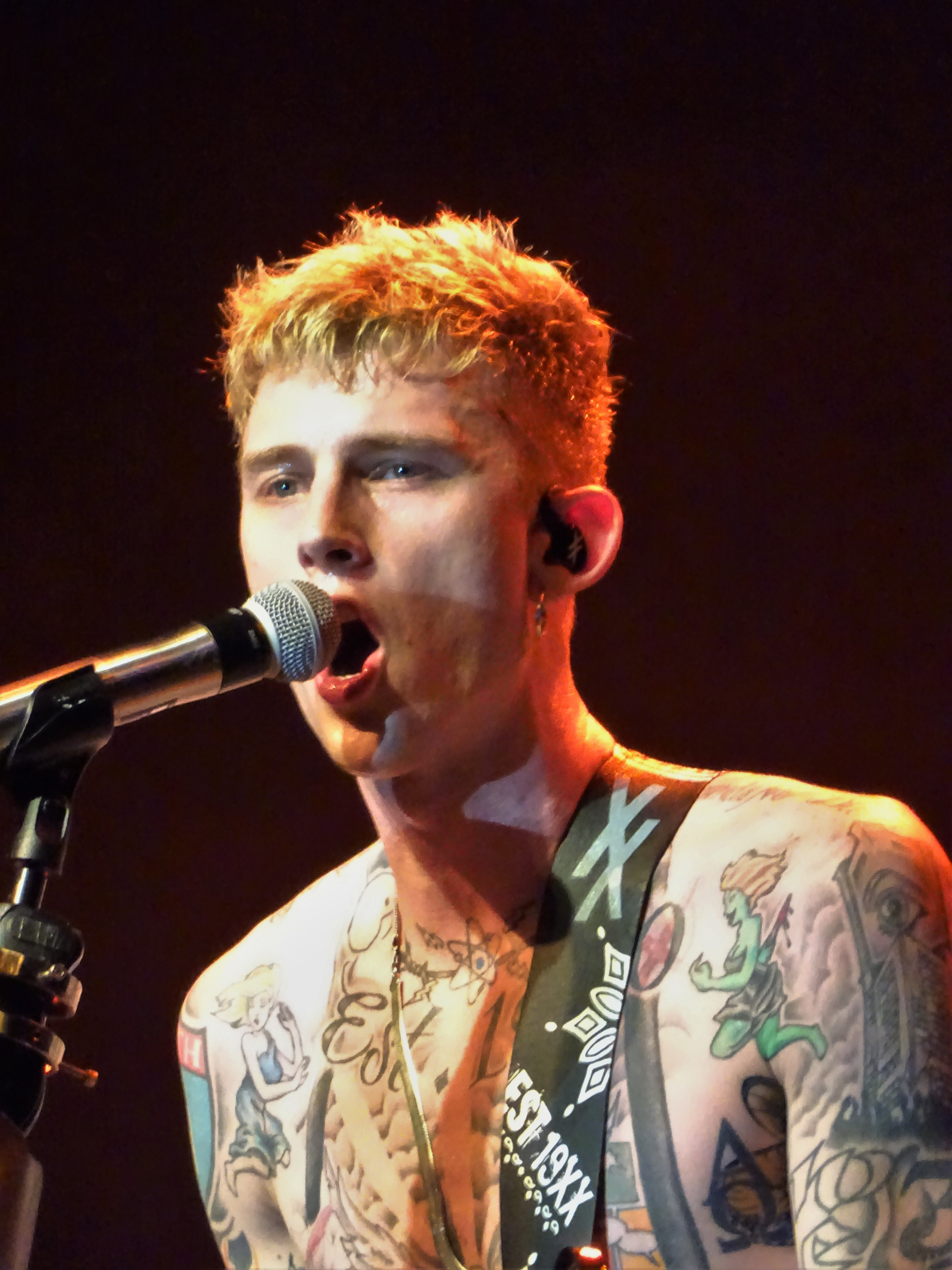
Machine Gun Kelly performing

- Artists such as Machine Gun Kelly, Willow Smith, Maggie Lindemann, Meet Me @ the Altar, Kenny Hoopla, Origami Angel, Waterparks, Magnolia Park and Travis Barker released tracks that achieved general praise from the public. Tickets to My Downfall by Machine Gun Kelly reached number one on the Billboard 200 chart in 2020. Willow Smith collaborated with Travis Barker from Blink-182 on the song "Transparent Soul" which reached the top 10 on the rock charts. Avril Lavigne also returned to the genre in collaborations with Barker and Mod Sun. The Chaos Chapter: Freeze and the repackage Fight or Escape by the Korean boyband Tomorrow X Together brought pop punk and emocore references, mainly on their lead singles "0X1=Lovesong (I Know I Love You)" and "Loser=Lover".
- In another crossover phenomenon of the early 2020s several established rap artists released pop punk material, including Machine Gun Kelly, the Kid Laroi, Blackbear and Mod Sun.
- Paramore released their first album in six years, This Is Why, with the album debuting at number two on the Billboard 200 chart. The band is considered to have brought pop-punk back into the mainstream, a genre in which they were a major part of in the late 2000s. The album went on to win Best Rock Album at the 66th Grammy Awards, with the song "This Is Why" winning Best Alternative Music Performance.
- The 2020s also marked the reunion of My Chemical Romance; in addition to their reunion tour, they released their new single "The Foundations of Decay". The bands Panic! at the Disco and Fall Out Boy also made comebacks with the former's album Viva Las Vengeance and the latter released their album So Much (for) Stardust after going on the Hella Mega Tour with Green Day and Weezer. Mexican-American emo band Pierce the Veil went viral in 2022 due to its popularity on TikTok. Veteran punk bands such as Blink-182, The Offspring and Simple Plan have also continued to release new music.

==== Shoegaze ====
After a period of relative obscurity in the 2000s and early 2010s, Shoegaze experienced a resurgence in the mid-2010s and early 2020s with the emergence of new bands like DIIV, Nothing, and Whirr, who drew inspiration from the classic Shoegaze sound while incorporating modern production techniques and songwriting sensibilities. In the 2020s, this revival continued to gain momentum, with a growing number of contemporary bands incorporating Shoegaze elements into their music. Additionally, social media platforms like TikTok have helped to raise the profile of Shoegaze among Zoomer audiences, introducing the genre to a new generation of listeners. In addition to widely listening to 1990s Shoegaze music, the surge of shoegaze-inspired Gen Z music may be considered its own genre, generally referred to as Zoomergaze. Contemporary Artists such as Wisp, Julie, Narrow Head, DIIV, Quannnic, FlyingFish, Jane Remover, Glare and Modern Color gained prominence in online music discussion circles.

=== Electronic & dance ===
==== Hyperpop ====
Hyperpop is a subgenre of electronic music that combines experimental dance production with pop songwriting. Hyperpop-adjacent musicians such as Charli XCX, Ayesha Erotica, Dorian Electra, Odetari, Slayyyter, A.G Cook, Quinn, Alice Longyu Gao, Gupi, Hannah Diamond, Yung Lean, Midwxst, Arca, Ericdoa, Frost Children, underscores, 6arelyhuman, Glaive, Kim Petras, Jane Remover, Alice Glass, ElyOtto, Ecco2k, That Kid, Bladee, and 100 gecs produced songs that were well received and became popular in niche LGBT music circles.

Scottish musician Sophie, who revolutionized avant-pop and experimental pop genres and represented transgender people in the electronic music scene, died on January 31, 2021.

==== Notable electronic & dance acts ====
Charli XCX is considered the front-runner in bringing the hyperpop genre to mainstream listeners. In 2020 and 2022 she released her fourth and fifth studio albums how i'm feeling now and Crash, respectively. The former connected with listeners during the COVID-19 pandemic due to its themes of self-reflection and isolation. In 2024, her sixth studio album Brat became a new peak for XCX in terms of album sales. The album rollout sparked a major internet trend, known as "Brat Summer", which brought a newfound spotlight onto XCX and her past projects. The album spawned multiple hits, namely tracks like "Guess", and "Apple", with the latter having a popular dance on TikTok attached to it. At the 67th Annual Grammy Awards, XCX won Best Dance/Electronic Album for Brat, as well as Best Dance Pop Recording for "Von Dutch".

Beyoncé ventured into house music with her 2022 album, Renaissance. The debuted at number one on the Billboard 200 chart. The album was preceded by number one single, "Break My Soul", and was followed with "Cuff It", which reached number six on the Billboard Hot 100. At the 65th Annual Grammy Awards, she won Best Dance/Electronic Album for Renaissance, Best R&B Song for "Cuff It", and Best Traditional R&B Performance for "Plastic Off the Sofa".

PinkPantheress released her debut mixtape, To Hell with It, in 2021. She released her debut studio album, Heaven Knows, in 2023, spawning the hit "Boy's a Liar Pt. 2" with rapper Ice Spice. in 2025, PinkPantheress released her second mixtape Fancy That, preceded by the single, "Illegal". The remixed version of the mixtape was released that same year, spawning the hit single "Stateside" with singer Zara Larsson. Fancy That and "Illegal" were nominated for Best Electronic/Dance Album and Best Dance Pop Recording at the 68th Annual Grammy Awards, respectively.

==== Jersey club ====
Jersey club is a fast, aggressive dance music style rooted in Baltimore's fusion of house and hip hop. It features harder kick sounds and chopped samples, with a distinctive "bounciness" due to its triplet percussive pattern. Common audio programs used in Jersey club's include Sony Acid Pro and FL Studio. 2018-2020 saw the resurgence of Jersey club music as artists like Unicorn151, Chad B, DJ Jay Hood, Cookiee Kawaii, and Uniiqu3 created original rap songs using Jersey club beats. This format allowed radio stations like Hot 97, Z100, Power 105.1, and SiriusXM to play these records regularly, gaining a wider audience. In 2022, Lil Uzi Vert released their song "Just Wanna Rock" which incorporates elements of Jersey Club and has since peaked at number 10 on the Billboard Hot 100. In 2023, many commercially successful K-pop songs began using elements of the Jersey Club drum pattern such as "Ditto" and "Super Shy" by NewJeans, and "Eve, Psyche & the Bluebeard's Wife" by Le Sserafim.

=== Soundtrack ===
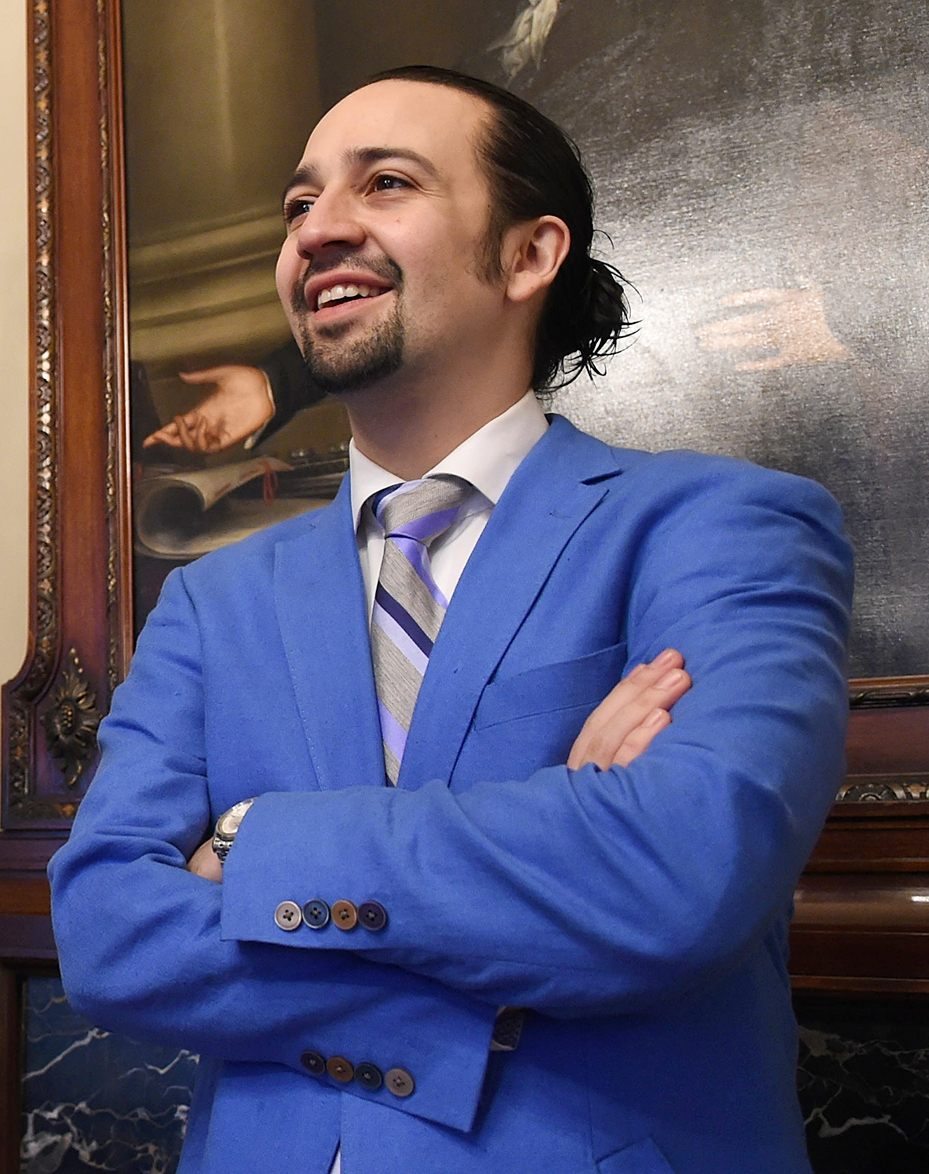
American playwright and musician Lin-Manuel Miranda wrote the original songs for the soundtrack of Encanto, a viral phenomenon.

The soundtrack of Encanto, Disney's 2021 animated fantasy film, written and produced by American playwright Lin-Manuel Miranda, was a viral phenomenon, enjoying widespread popularity on the internet. It has spent multiple weeks atop the Billboard 200 chart. Far Out called the phenomenon "Encanto-mania". The TikTok videos tagged with the hashtag "#encanto" have received more than 11.5 billion views in total, as of January 23, 2022. The most popular song of the soundtrack was "We Don't Talk About Bruno", a salsa tune which experienced commercial success in 2022. "Dos Oruguitas" was nominated for the Academy Award for Best Original Song at the 94th Academy Awards.

Movie soundtrack albums have been receiving newfound attention, recently coined "The Barbie Effect", due to the profound impact from movies like Barbie. Multiple songs from the film went viral, and charted on the Billboard Hot 100. The album was preceded by hit singles like Eilish's "What Was I Made For?", as well as Charli XCX's "Speed Drive", both charting on the Hot 100. Songs that reached the top ten included Lipa's "Dance the Night", and Minaj and Ice Spice's "Barbie World", which featured the original singers of "Barbie Girl", Aqua. Barbie the Album debuted at number two on the Billboard 200, becoming the highest-charting soundtrack album of 2023.

== Asia ==
=== K-pop ===
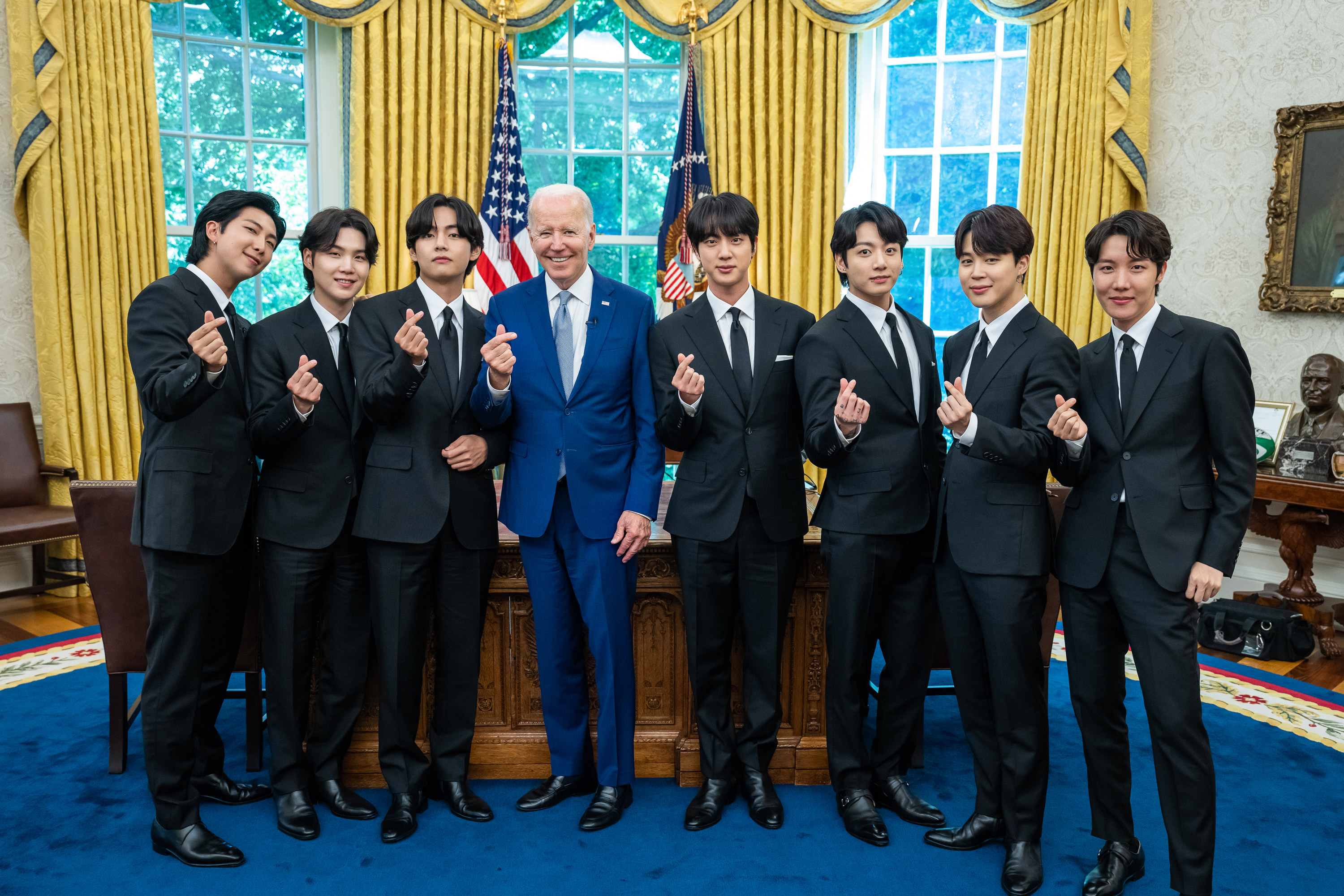
K-pop group BTS continued to be one of the most popular bands of the 2020s.

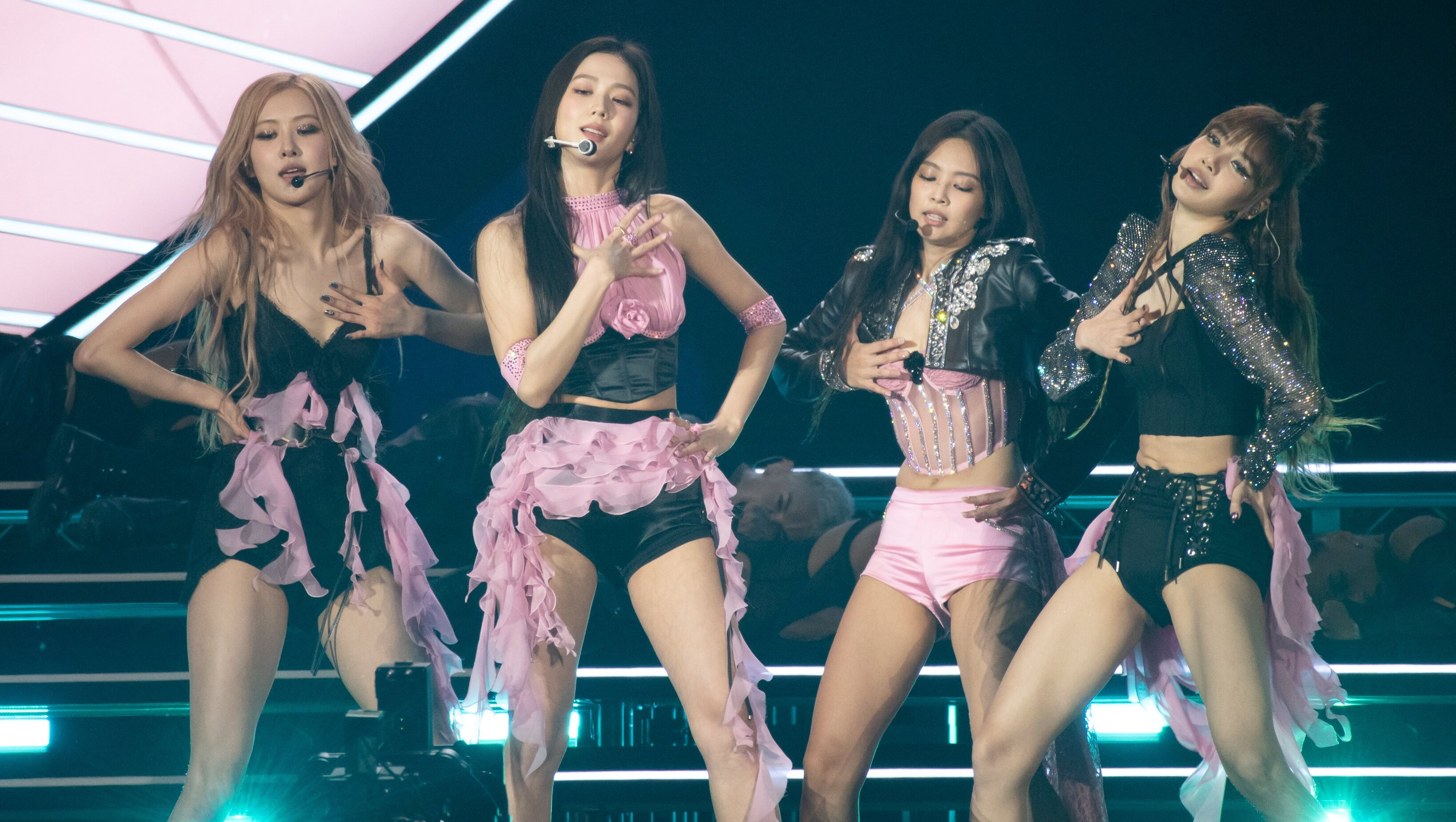
Blackpink's Born Pink became the first album by a girl group in over 20 years to top both the US and UK album charts.

The 2020s have featured some heavily successful group debuts. In November 2020, BTS became the first Korean pop artist to be recognized by the Recording Academy when "Dynamite" received a nomination for Best Pop Duo/Group Performance at the 63rd Annual Grammy Awards; they were again nominated the following year with "Butter". On April 16, 2022, 2NE1 reunited after 6 years with a surprise performance on the main stage of Coachella, with Aespa also performing on the same stage the following weekend. During the same year, several top second generation artists made an official comeback after years of inactivity, including BigBang, Girls' Generation, and Kara. Blackpink's 2022 album Born Pink became the first album by a female group to top the chart since Danity Kane's Welcome to the Dollhouse in 2008. In addition, it marked the first time a girl group simultaneously topped the album charts in the United States and United Kingdom in 21 years, since Destiny's Child's Survivor in 2001. Ejae took the stage at the opening ceremony of the 2026 FIFA World Cup in Mexico and joined other artists for the official song "DNA" of the tournament.

The sales of K-pop albums continued to show strong performance in the American market in 2023, with 7 of the 10 best-selling CD albums in the US being K-pop albums. Four K-pop groups were named amongst the top-ten best-selling artists worldwide in 2023 by the IFPI, including Seventeen, Stray Kids, TXT, and NewJeans.

=== Korean hip hop and R&B ===
In the 2020s, Korean hip hop and Korean R&B continued to sustain popularity on the Spotify charts, with artists such as Jay Park, Tiger JK, J-Hope, Changmo, DPR Live, DPR Ian, Dean, Bibi, Zico, and Jessi attracting mainstream audiences with their blend of Korean and Western musical styles. Their music has not only gained recognition domestically, but also internationally. Other notable K-hip-hop and R&B artists include Epik High, Sik-K, Big Naughty, E Sens, PH-1, Kid Milli, Leellamarz, Yang Hong-won, Beenzio, and Heize. Their diverse styles have contributed to the genre's growing success and appeal for a global audience.

=== Japanese pop ===
As of 2023, Japan remains the second-largest music market by revenue. Physical music still dominates the market holding a 65.5% market share by value as of 2023. Since the start of the decade J-pop has begun to appear in global charts. However, it had not had such global popularity before. Japanese pop duo Yoasobi, formed in 2019, enjoyed further breakthrough success in the 2020s. Their song "Idol" became the first Japanese-language song to reach number one on the Billboard Global Excl. US. Domestically, Oricon and Billboard Japan placed it as the best-performing song of 2023. Kenshi Yonezu's 2025 single "Iris Out" ranked highest peak at number five on the Billboard Global 200. Anime songs, a genre originating directly from J-Pop would also continue growing in global popularity during the decade. Japanese pop — anime song artists that lead the genres during the decade include Creepy Nuts, Ado, Fujii Kaze, LiSA, and King Gnu.

=== Mandopop ===
In the early 2020s, long-time artists such as Jay Chou and JJ Lin remained prominent in Mandopop and were among the most streamed mandopop artists of 2023 on Spotify. Within Asia, they also remain continued to attract audiences through their Carnival World Tour and JJ20 World Tour concert tours respectively.

== Europe ==
=== Pop ===
Harry Styles, Ed Sheeran, Adele, and Dua Lipa have been some of the most popular European musicians.

Dua Lipa established herself as the biggest British female popstar since Adele, with her third album Radical Optimism debuting at No.1 on the UK Albums Chart, with the highest first week sales for a British female artist since Adele's 30. Lipa became the only solo female UK star to sell out multiple dates at Wembley Stadium for her Radical Optimism Tour and booked immense success with the singles from her sophomore album Future Nostalgia, whose singles experienced great success on European radio.

Central Cee made his debut with Day in the Life on 14 June 2020. He followed it up with Molly in July, and achieved further success with the single Loading, released on 22 October 2020. Loading and February 2021's Commitment Issues both reached the top 20 of the UK Singles Chart.

=== Rock ===
In England, the 2020s saw the development of the Windmill scene: a musical scene centered around the Windmill pub in Brixton, often associated with post-punk and experimental rock as well as a spoken vocal style and progressive rock influence. Described by the Ramapo College of New Jersey's Ramapo News in 2025 as "the most significant movement in rock music in the past decade", among the bands described as being part of the Windmill Scene are Black Midi, Black Country, New Road, Squid, Fontaines D.C., Maruja, and Ugly. Other notable European rock acts of the decade include Måneskin, Viagra Boys, IDLES, King Krule and The 1975.

In 2022, Coldplay launched the Music of the Spheres World Tour, which became the most-attended concert tour in history and was credited with pioneering sustainability efforts in the live entertainment industry.

In 2023, Paul McCartney announced plans to release "the final Beatles record" later in the year with the assistance of an AI de-mixing technology previously used for Beatles documentary Get Back to be used on a demo John Lennon recorded shortly before his death. The track, "Now and Then", was released on November 2, 2023. Also in 2023, The Rolling Stones made a comeback with Hackney Diamonds, a new original studio album that topped the charts in 20 countries.

In 2024, Oasis announced their reunion in the form of the Oasis Live '25 Tour, eliciting historic demand for tickets and controversy regarding the Noel and Liam Gallagher's relationship, and a revival of lad culture.

In 2025, the original lineup of Black Sabbath reunited for a benefit concert, titled Back to the Beginning, which concluded with the final live performances of both the band and lead singer Ozzy Osbourne, who died seventeen days after the event.

=== Electronic ===
At the 42nd Brit Awards, the British Phonographic Industry (BPI) brought back their Best British Dance Act category, which had been revived following the removal of gendered awards and was first presented in 2022 to Becky Hill, who then took the award once again in 2023; Calvin Harris won in 2024. Other electronic acts that gained a nomination include Fred Again, Joel Corry, RAYE, Bonobo, Eliza Rose, Barry Can't Swim and Romy.

In 2023, DJ Calvin Harris and electropop singer-songwriter Ellie Goulding released their third collaboration, "Miracle", a trance song inspired by Eurodance and techno, as well as commercial success, topping the UK Singles Charts for eight non-consecutive weeks and earning a Grammy Award nomination.

A commercial renaissance of drum and bass took place in 2023, thanks to the likes of Kenya Grace, whose single "Strangers" was a commercial success, including the UK Singles Chart, and Cassö, whose remix of "Ferrari Horses" by D-Block Europe and RAYE, "Prada", dominated the charts. Luude, PinkPantheress, Chases & Status, Nia Archives, Pendulum were also part of the comeback of drum and bass.

At the 2023 Grammy Awards ceremony, on the inaugural Best Dance Pop Recording category, seven out of the eight nominees were European, including: Australians singers Kylie Minogue (for "Padam Padam") and Troye Sivan (for "Rush"), American singer Bebe Rexha (for "One in a Million"), British singers Ellie Goulding (for "Miracle") and Anne-Marie (for "Baby Don't Hurt Me"), French DJ David Guetta (for "Baby Don't Hurt Me" and "One in a Million"), and Scottish DJ Calvin Harris (for "Miracle").

== Latin America and Caribbean ==
=== Latin pop ===
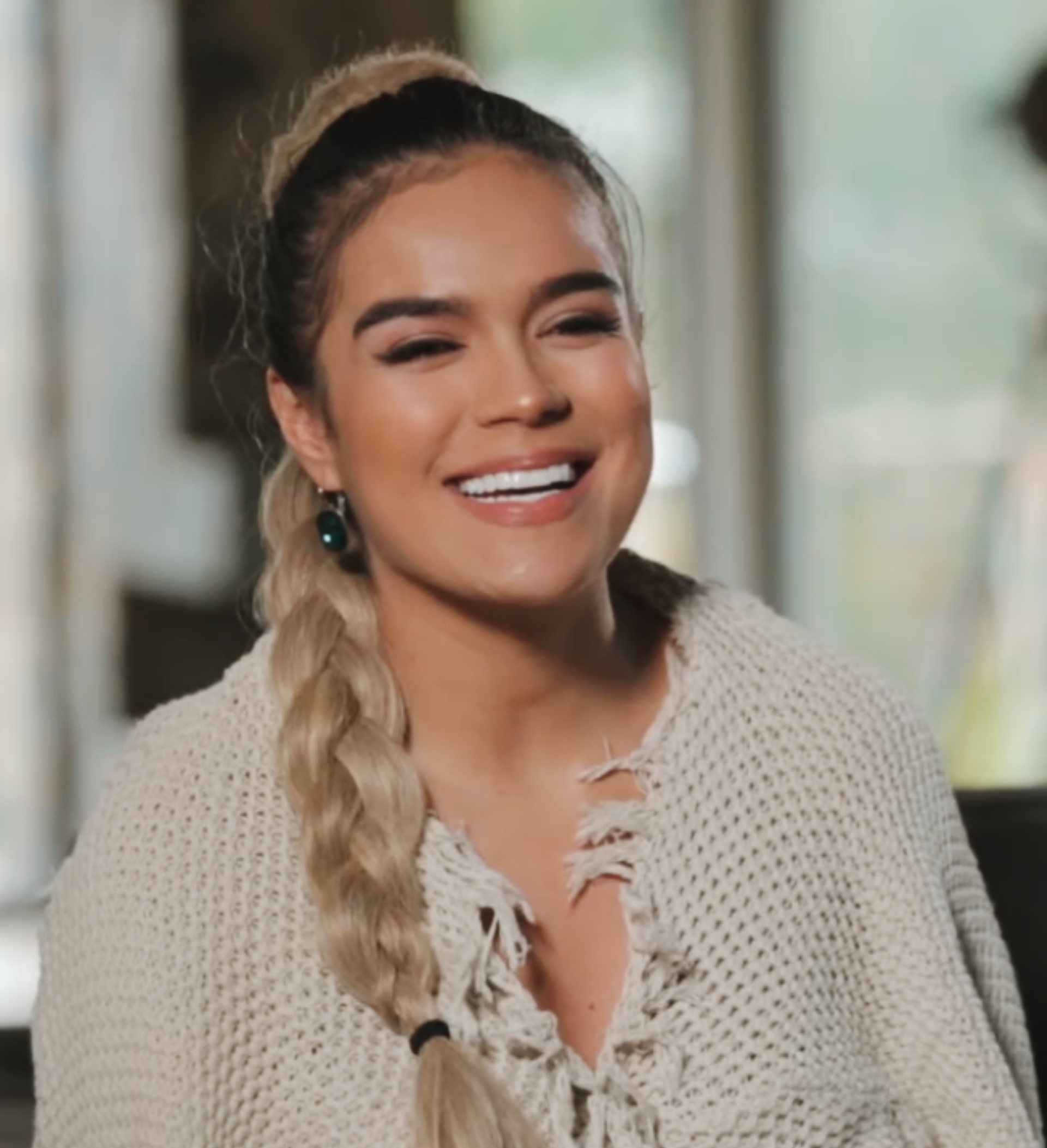
Karol G

Latin pop and other Latin music genres such as reggaeton continue to be successful in the 2020s. Anitta's "Envolver" song became the first song by a Latin female act to reach the number one on Spotify Global Daily chart, reaching the number two on the Billboard Global 200 and the number one in Billboard Global Excl. U.S. The reggaeton-influenced album Motomami by Rosalía caught international attention with its singles "La Fama" and "Saoko" and became the best reviewed and most discussed album of 2022 on Metacritic.

=== Reggaeton ===
The late 2010s saw a major cultural resurgence in Latin dance music with hip hop influences which carried throughout the 2020s, especially throughout 2022 and 2023, when the interest in Spanish-language songs in North America grew rapidly. Initially, artists such as Bad Bunny, Chencho Corleone, Ozuna, Karol G and Rauw Alejandro saw crossover success in the United States while remaining popular internationally. After the success of Bad Bunny's 2022 album Un Verano Sin Ti, which had already become the most streamed Spanish-language album on Spotify within the first few months of release, Spanish-language songs started occupying at least 20-25% of the Billboard Hot 100 on an average week, compared to about 5-10% in 2020, with artists such as Bizarrap, Grupo Frontera, Peso Pluma, and Shakira being among the most popular during this new wave. Released in May 2022, Manuel Turizo's single "La Bachata" achieved commercial success, spending 26 weeks at number one on the Billboard Latin charts.

== Africa ==
=== Afrobeats ===
Nigeria undoubtly has been the leader in Afrobeats and many of their artists such as Tems, who has been one of the primary innovators of the genre's popularity in the decade. "Calm Down" (2022) by Nigerian rapper Rema, featuring Selena Gomez, found global success and became the best-selling Afrobeats song of all time. "Water" (2023) by South African singer Tyla also found international success. Burna Boy's album African Giant and Wizkid's album Made in Lagos achieved chart success on the Billboard World Albums chart. Songs like Burna Boy's "Ye", Wizkid's "Essence", and Davido's "Fall" have garnered millions of streams and downloads worldwide, contributing to the genre's growing presence on streaming platforms and the Billboard charts.

== See also ==
- 2010s in music
