= Nosebleeds (song) =

2025 single by Doechii

Single by Doechii
- Released: February 3, 2025
- Genre: Hip-hop
- Length: 2:15
- Label: Top Dawg; Capitol
- Songwriters: Jaylah Hickmon; Jonas Jeberg
- Producer: Jeberg

Doechii singles chronology
"Denial Is a River" (2025)	"Nosebleeds" (2025)	"ExtraL" (2025)

"Nosebleeds" is a single by American rapper Doechii. It was released on February 3, 2025, only hours after she won Best Rap Album for Alligator Bites Never Heal at the 67th Annual Grammy Awards. The song finds Doechii celebrating her victory and was produced by Jonas Jeberg.

== Composition and lyrics ==
The song consists of simple production using electronic sounds. Lyrically, Doechii directs taunts at her hating rivals and gloats over her success, references Kanye West's acceptance speech at the 47th Annual Grammy Awards (in lines such as "I don't know, is she gonna go crazy? Is she gonna go crazy? / Everybody wanted to know what Doechii would do if she didn't win / I guess we'll never—"; "'Will she ever lose?' Man, I guess we'll never know"; and "Guess we'll never see the day that Doechii crown falls / Guess you'll never live to see the day that Doechii loses"), thanks those who have encouraged her, including Top Dawg Entertainment associates SZA, Isaiah Rashad and Anthony "Moosa" Tiffith Jr., her mother, Blake High School, and the female artists she has competed with. Doechii also addresses the speculation surrounding her nominations and why she earned them. The song segues into a double-time beat toward the end, in which Doechii states that she would take no advice from anyone who has "never suffered".

== Charts ==
Chart performance for "Nosebleeds"
Chart (2025)	Peak position
New Zealand Hot Singles (RMNZ)	18
US Bubbling Under Hot 100 (Billboard)	13
