= Denial Is a River =

2025 single by Doechii

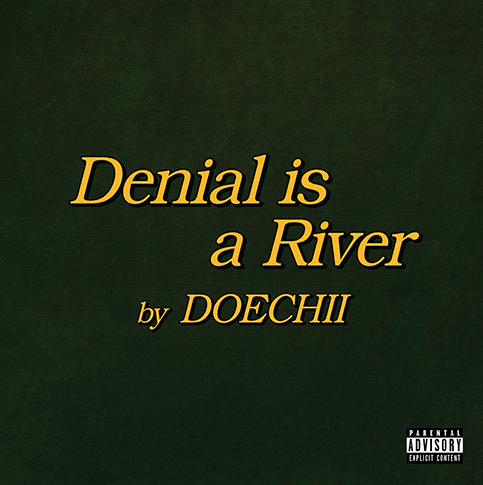

Single by Doechii

from the album Alligator Bites Never Heal
- B-side: "Denial Is a River" (instrumental)
- Released: January 28, 2025
- Recorded: 2024
- Genre: Hip-hop
- Length: 2:39
- Label: Top Dawg; Capitol
- Songwriters: Jaylah Hickmon; James Ian Anderson; Joey Hamhock
- Producers: IanJames; Hamhock; Banser

Doechii singles chronology
"I Hate Your Ex-Girlfriend" (2024)	"Denial Is a River" (2025)	"Nosebleeds" (2025)

Music video
- "Denial Is a River" on YouTube

"Denial Is a River" (stylized in uppercase) is a song by American rapper Doechii from her second mixtape Alligator Bites Never Heal (2024). It was released to pop and rhythmic contemporary radio as the mixtape's third single on January 28, 2025. It was produced by Ian James, Joey Hamhock and Banser. The song reached the top ten in the United Kingdom and New Zealand.

At the APRA Music Awards of 2026, the song was nominated for Most Performed International Work.

== Content ==
The beat for "Denial Is a River" was created by producer Ian James, who originally published it on YouTube in 2022 under the title "MF DOOM Type Beat - Golden". He constructed the beat from a drum stab found in Paul Nice's 5 Fingers Of Death; the opening vocal of "hey, I thought it was all over” was also a Paul Nice sample. James recalled in October 2024 that he was not satisfied with the track at the time and felt that it was not finished, but released it because he wanted to maintain an upload schedule on YouTube. He said the beat is "simple" and reflected that he had learned: "You don't have to have all these layers, it just has to have a vibe ... don't overthink it."

The song incorporates Doechii's therapist alter-ego, to whom Doechii herself narrates the hectic and often troublesome conditions of her own life, such as failed relationships involving her being cheated on, milestones of her career, a drug addiction she developed in Hollywood (which she humorously denies), partying there, periods of burnout and depression, and the overall struggle to balance her career with her personal life. At the end of the song, Doechii tries a breathing exercise that her therapist suggests and hyperventilates rhythmically amid the scratching in the background.

The song's title is a play on the phrase "denial is (not just) a river in Egypt", popularised online by a viral excerpt from The Wendy Williams Experience. In the clip, Williams exclaims, "denial is a river in Egypt, your husband is gay!" in the context of a woman denying that her husband is homosexual, which Doechii reflects in the first verse when she discusses her ex-boyfriend cheating on her with another man.

== Critical reception ==
The song was well received by music critics. Ana Lamond of Clash wrote the song "unveils Doechii at her best, a detailed storyteller who leads with a playful, nostalgic pomp." Kyann-Sian Williams of NME called it proof that "Doechii is a witty, comical songwriter who can tell you vivid stories with little effort, and this approach allows that side of her to shine". Reviewing Alligator Bites Never Heal for Rolling Stone, Conteh Mankaprr remarked "The standout is 'Denial is a River,' in which Doechii gives an Oscar-worthy performance as both herself and a therapist of sorts in an immaculate display of her quirks, relatability, and tenderness." AllMusic's Andy Kellman stated, "The humorous if vulnerable 'Denial Is a River' is storytelling on the level of MC Lyte and Slick Rick with late-'80s production touches to match." Zachary Horvath of HotNewHipHop praised Doechii's introspective lyrics "all while being dynamic and comical in her vocal delivery." Grant Jones of RapReviews described the song as "characterful" and an "updated" and "more personal" version of the song "Word Association" by 7L & Esoteric and the breath control exercise in the outro as "highlighting her knack for crafting catchy off-the-cuff moments."

== Music video ==
Doechii released two trailers for the official music video in December 2024, the first of which used the theme song of the sitcom Family Matters, "As Days Go By". The video premiered on January 2, 2025. Co-directed by Carlos Acosta and James Mackel, it stars Doechii in her own autobiographical sitcom. It opens with a title sequence parodying that of Family Matters as Doechii enters the house. She catches her boyfriend (played by Zack Fox) cuddling with a man (played by Rickey Thompson) on her couch and throws him out of the house in the same manner as Jazz from The Fresh Prince of Bel-Air. After that, new decor is added to the living room; Doechii hangs a photo of herself, Top Dawg Entertainment founder Anthony "Top Dawg" Tiffith and label president Moosa Tiffith on a wall. The room is full of her friends and intruded by music industry executives, who are driven out by Doechii and her group. In the next scene, the green walls of the living room have been painted red and the room is now furnished with more expensive-looking items, including a line of plaques on the back wall. The clip transitions from old to modern style cinematography and zooms out to show Doechii on set, with previous sets as seen in the trailers besides it, and being watched by a studio audience. Later, her nose bleeds and the set of her new living room explodes, leaving Doechii alone in the wreckage. The video features cameos from Baby Tate, DJ Miss Milan, Earl Sweatshirt, H Wood, Schoolboy Q, SiR and Teezo Touchdown.

== Charts ==
=== Weekly charts ===
Weekly chart performance for "Denial Is a River"
Chart (2025)	Peak position
Australia (ARIA)	13
Australia Hip Hop/R&B (ARIA)	3
Austria (Ö3 Austria Top 40)	55
Canada Hot 100 (Billboard)	27
France (SNEP)	171
Global 200 (Billboard)	24
Greece International (IFPI)	22
Iceland (Tónlistinn)	18
Ireland (IRMA)	13
Lithuania (AGATA)	34
Lithuania Airplay (TopHit)	56
Netherlands (Single Top 100)	64
New Zealand (Recorded Music NZ)	10
Nigeria (TurnTable Top 100)	97
Philippines (Philippines Hot 100)	60
Poland (Polish Streaming Top 100)	69
South Africa (TOSAC)	97
South Korea (Circle)	154
Sweden (Sverigetopplistan)	68
Switzerland (Schweizer Hitparade)	47
UK Singles (OCC)	9
UK Hip Hop/R&B (OCC)	2
US Billboard Hot 100	21
US Hot R&B/Hip-Hop Songs (Billboard)	7
US Pop Airplay (Billboard)	21
US Rhythmic Airplay (Billboard)	1

=== Monthly charts ===
Monthly chart performance for "Denial Is a River"
Chart (2025)	Position
Lithuania Airplay (TopHit)	88
South Korea (Circle)	173

=== Year-end charts ===
Year-end chart performance for "Denial Is a River"
Chart (2025)	Position
Australia (ARIA)	76
Canada (Canadian Hot 100)	76
Global 200 (Billboard)	180
New Zealand (Recorded Music NZ)	48
US Billboard Hot 100	75
US Hot R&B/Hip-Hop Songs (Billboard)	17
US Rhythmic Airplay (Billboard)	20

== Certifications ==
Certifications for "Denial Is a River"
Region	Certification	Certified units/sales
Australia (ARIA)	Platinum	70,000^{‡}
Brazil (Pro-Música Brasil)	3× Platinum	120,000^{‡}
Canada (Music Canada)	2× Platinum	160,000^{‡}
New Zealand (RMNZ)	Platinum	30,000^{‡}
United Kingdom (BPI)	Gold	400,000^{‡}
United States (RIAA)	Platinum	1,000,000^{‡}
^{‡} Sales+streaming figures based on certification alone.

== Release history ==
Release history for "Denial Is a River"
Region	Date	Format	Label	Ref.
United States	January 28, 2025	Contemporary hit radio; rhythmic contemporary radio	Capitol	
