= Nissan Altima (song) =

2024 single by Doechii

Single by Doechii

from the album Alligator Bites Never Heal
- Released: July 27, 2024
- Recorded: 2024
- Genre: Hip-hop
- Length: 2:08
- Label: Top Dawg; Capitol
- Songwriters: Jaylah Hickmon; Markus Randle
- Producer: Childish Major

Doechii singles chronology
"Rocket" (2024)	"Nissan Altima" (2024)	"Boom Bap" (2024)

Music video
- "Nissan Altima" on YouTube

"Nissan Altima" is a song by American rapper Doechii, released on July 27, 2024, as the lead single from her second mixtape Alligator Bites Never Heal (2024). It was produced by Childish Major.

== Content ==
In the song, Doechii performs in a rapid-fire flow. The lyrics center around Doechii asserting her dominance in sexual matters, with emphasis on her bisexuality: "Cunnilingus Dalai Lama / Doechii cooler than a fan, but she get hotter than a sauna / Take a trip out of Japan and I tsunami her vagina / Wine and dine her, Benihana, I'm the new hip-hop Madonna / I'm the new hip-hop Madonna, I'm the trap Grace Jones / I don't know what type of motherfuckin' crack they on / I'm like Carrie Bradshaw with a back brace on / I been carrying you bitches now for way too long".

== Critical reception ==
Andy Kellman of AllMusic wrote, "Her microphone control and wordplay are in top form on 'Nissan Altima,' a swift and booming track where the self-dubbed 'trap Grace Jones' alternately motivates and intimidates with belligerent verses that include a shrugging note of her replacement of a man with a woman." Lily Goldberg of Pitchfork commented, "Heat takes over on 'Nissan Altima,' a standout filled with flavor and filth".

== Music video ==
The music video was directed by James Mackel and released alongside the single. It sees Doechii cruising in a Nissan Altima with rappers and fellow TDE labelmates Jay Rock, Ab-Soul and Isaiah Rashad. The car is then towed, but they stay beside it on the bed of the tow truck as Doechii raps.

== Awards and nominations ==
Year	Award	Category	Result	Ref.
2025	Grammy Awards	Best Rap Performance	Nominated	

== Charts ==
=== Weekly charts ===
Weekly chart performance for "Nissan Altima"
Chart (2025)	Peak position
Australia Hip Hop/R&B (ARIA)	19
Canada Hot 100 (Billboard)	79
Global 200 (Billboard)	155
Ireland (IRMA)	77
New Zealand Hot Singles (RMNZ)	24
UK Singles (Official Charts)	66
UK Hip Hop/R&B (Official Charts)	26
US Billboard Hot 100	73
US Hot R&B/Hip-Hop Songs (Billboard)	26

=== Year-end charts ===
Year-end chart performance for "Nissan Altima"
Chart (2025)	Position
US Hot R&B/Hip-Hop Songs (Billboard)	64

== Certifications ==
Certifications for "Nissan Altima"
Region	Certification	Certified units/sales
Australia (ARIA)	Gold	35,000^{‡}
Brazil (Pro-Música Brasil)	Platinum	40,000^{‡}
New Zealand (RMNZ)	Gold	15,000^{‡}
United Kingdom (BPI)	Silver	200,000^{‡}
United States (RIAA)	Gold	500,000^{‡}
^{‡} Sales+streaming figures based on certification alone.
