= Doechii =

American rapper (born 1998)

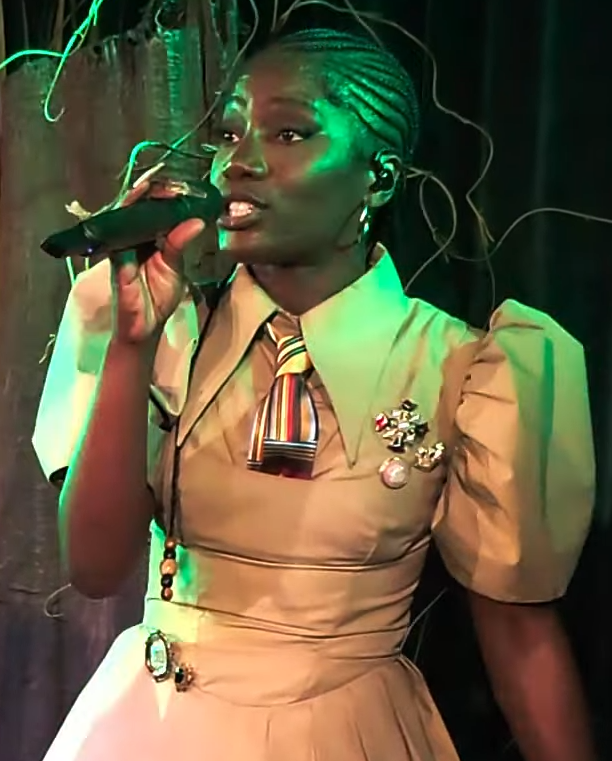
- Doechii in 2024

Background information
- Also known as: Swamp Princess
- Born: Jaylah Ji'mya Hickmon; August 14, 1998 (age 28); Tampa, Florida, U.S.
- Genres: Hip-hop; R&B; pop
- Occupations: Rapper; singer; songwriter; actress
- Works: Doechii discography
- Years active: 2016–present
- Labels: Top Dawg; Capitol
- Website: iamdoechii.com

Jaylah Ji'mya Hickmon (born August 14, 1998), known professionally as Doechii (/ˈdoʊtʃi/ DOH-chee), is an American rapper, singer, songwriter and actress. After her songs went viral on TikTok in 2021, she signed recording contracts with Top Dawg Entertainment and Capitol Records in 2022. Her 2023 single, "What It Is (Block Boy)" (featuring Kodak Black), marked her first entry on the Billboard Hot 100 and received platinum certification by the Recording Industry Association of America (RIAA). That same year, she made her acting debut with the drama film Earth Mama.

Doechii's second mixtape, Alligator Bites Never Heal (2024), peaked within the top ten of the Billboard 200 and was met with critical acclaim. It won Best Rap Album at the 67th Annual Grammy Awards—making her the third woman to win the category—and spawned the singles "Nissan Altima", "Boom Bap", and "Denial Is a River". Its bonus single, "Anxiety", became her first song to peak within the Billboard Hot 100's top ten; its music video won the Grammy Award for Best Music Video. She also appeared on Tyler, the Creator's song "Balloon" in 2024, the remix of the Weeknd and Playboi Carti's single "Timeless" in 2025, and Lady Gaga's song "Runway" in 2026.

Doechii's accolades include two Grammy Awards, two MTV Video Music Awards, a BET Award, and nominations for two Soul Train Music Awards. Additionally, Billboard Women in Music named her a Rising Star in 2023 and Woman of the Year in 2025.

== Early life ==
Jaylah Ji'mya Hickmon was born on August 14, 1998 in Tampa, Florida, where she was raised. She is the daughter of mother Celesia Moore and father Snatcha Da Boss, a rapper who recorded professionally. Her uncle was also a rapper. She has younger twin sisters. She has described her upbringing as Christian. Doechii attended Howard W. Blake High School and grew up performing ballet, tap dancing, acting, cheerleading, doing gymnastics, and playing soccer. She planned to become a professional choral singer until a friend encouraged her to produce and release her music online as an independent artist. In 2016, she sold hoodies with the phrase "Stay woke. Stay black." in protest of police brutality.

== Career ==
=== 2016–2023: Career beginnings ===
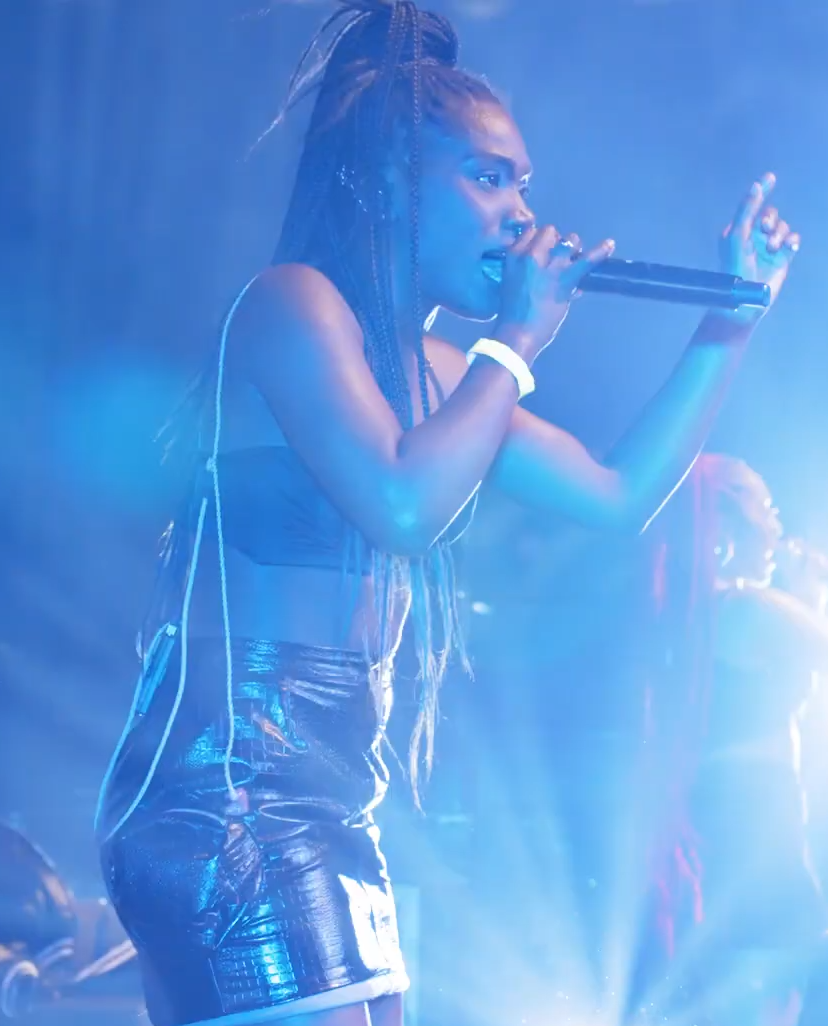
Doechii performing in July 2022

Doechii started writing poetry and rap lyrics in high school and had started making music by 2014. Doechii released her debut song "Girls" on SoundCloud in 2016 under the name Iamdoechii. In 2019, Doechii moved three times that year and eventually settled in New York City. She auditioned for a songwriter position at The Voice, but did not make the cut. Unable to afford a flight home to Tampa, she remained in New York and filed for unemployment while making music. One day while walking around in Brooklyn, Doechii randomly found a copy of the self-help book The Artist's Way in a stack of books on the pavement. Doechii began to read and follow the book, despite it already being written in, for three months in an effort to unlock her creative abilities and flow. She would go on to attribute the book to her success. As the pandemic was beginning, Doechii moved back to Tampa to continue working on her music. In late 2020, Doechii met DJ Miss Milan who would soon after become her official DJ and emcee.

One of Doechii's first projects, Coven Music Session, Vol. 1, was released in 2019, and her debut EP, Oh the Places You'll Go, was self-funded and released in 2020. It was described by Rolling Stone as a mix of pop, dance, and hip hop. "Yucky Blucky Fruitcake", a single from the EP released in September 2020, was inspired by her reading The Artist's Way and went viral on TikTok in 2021, earning her attention from record labels. Also in 2021, she released her second EP, Bra-Less; she was featured on Isaiah Rashad's song "Wat U Sed" from his album, The House Is Burning, which she performed with Rashad at the 2021 BET Hip Hop Awards; and was an opening act during SZA's 2021 tour.

In March 2022, Doechii was signed to Capitol Records by Chris Turner and to Top Dawg Entertainment, making her the first female rapper on the latter label. That same month, she released "Persuasive", her first single published through Top Dawg, and appeared as a featured artist on David Guetta and Afrojack's song "Trampoline", alongside Missy Elliott and Bia. In April 2022, she released the song "Crazy" with a music video. Her third EP and her first major label release, She / Her / Black Bitch, was released on August 5, 2022. Her July 2022 performance of her song "Persuasive" was nominated for Push Performance of the Year at the 2022 MTV Video Music Awards.

In April 2023, Doechii performed at Coachella. Also in 2023, she made her acting debut in Earth Mama, a drama film directed by Savanah Leaf. In the same year, she performed as an opening act on Doja Cat's The Scarlet Tour (2023) and opened for Beyoncé for her Renaissance World Tour.

=== 2024–present: Alligator Bites Never Heal ===
In August 2024, she released her second mixtape, Alligator Bites Never Heal, to critical acclaim. Pitchfork called it "her most ambitious and musically diverse release" filled with "playful and melodic sides without skimping on hard-hitting hip-hop". The mixtape won the Grammy Award for Best Rap Album at the 67th Annual Grammy Awards, making her the third woman to win in the category. Shortly after the event finished airing, she released the song "Nosebleeds" as a celebration of her win. Throughout 2024, Doechii featured on multiple songs: Katy Perry's "I'm His, He's Mine" (from her album 143), Tyler, the Creator's "Balloon" (from his album Chromakopia), and Banks's "I Hate Your Ex-Girlfriend" (from her 2025 album Off with Her Head). Variety named her the 2024 Hitmakers Hip-Hop Disruptor of the Year.

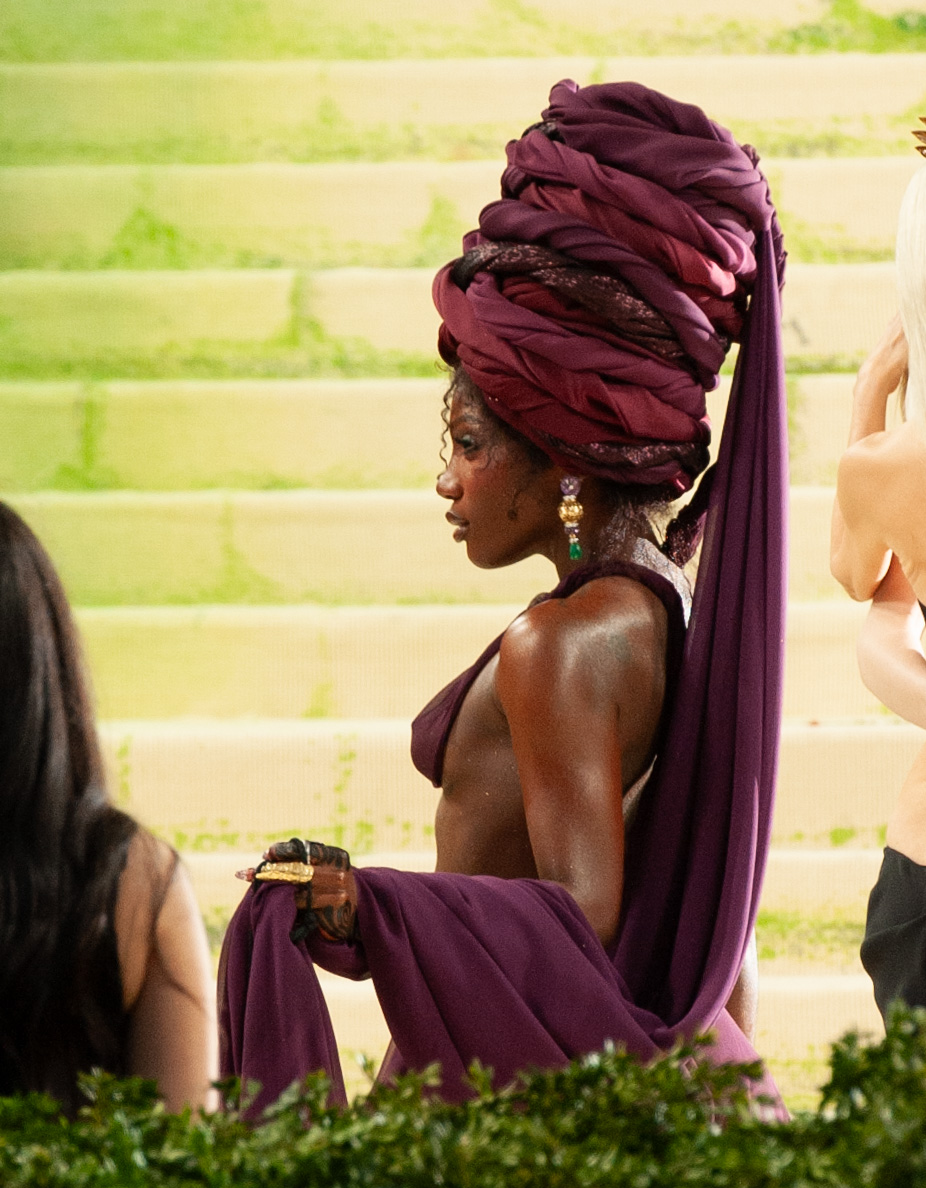
Doechii at the 2026 Met Gala

Doechii appeared as a guest judge on a January 2025 episode of RuPaul's Drag Race season 17, with her song "Alter Ego" featured in a lip-sync competition. The song's exposure in the episode resulted in significant chart increases across music streaming platforms. In February 2025, Doechii appeared as a feature on Jennie's song, "ExtraL". Doechii was nominated for Best New Artist and Best Rap Performance, and won Best Rap Album for the 2025 Grammy Awards. She also received several nominations for the 2025 NAACP Image Awards, including Outstanding New Artist, Outstanding Female Artist, Outstanding Music Video/Visual Album, and Outstanding Album. In 2025, Doechii became the second female rapper to receive the Billboard Woman of the Year award, following Cardi B in 2020. In March of the same year, she officially released the single "Anxiety" to digital streaming platforms, which prominently samples Gotye and Kimbra's 2011 single "Somebody That I Used to Know" and was originally a part of her 2019 self-released mixtape, Coven Music Session, Vol. 1. It had first been sampled by Sleepy Hallow for his eponymous 2023 song before Doechii's original version became popular on TikTok. In May of that year, Doechii was featured on the remix of Canadian singer-songwriter the Weeknd and fellow rapper Playboi Carti's 2024 song "Timeless". She performed at 2025 edition of music festival Lollapalooza, during which she announced her Live from the Swamp Tour. Tour dates were announced on August 4. On December 30, Doechii surprise-released a single with SZA titled "Girl, Get Up".

In January 2026, Doechii was featured on the song "Robbery" from ASAP Rocky's fourth studio album Don't Be Dumb. In February 2026, Doechii starred in the Levi Strauss & Co. global campaign "Behind Every Original", which premiered during Super Bowl LX; the campaign, directed by Kim Gehrig, featured Doechii alongside Rosé and Questlove, and showcased her in a segment choreographed by Robbie Blue. The second trailer of The Devil Wears Prada 2 featured the original Lady Gaga and Doechii song "Runway".

On August 29, 2026, Doechii performed at the Daisy Chain Fields benefit festival in Irvine, California. It was around a 40 minute set. All profits from the concert were donated to charities focused on women.

== Musical style and influences ==
Rolling Stone's Mankaprr Conteh described Doechii's rap delivery as "animated" and her song narratives as "quirky". Her music has been compared by critics to that of Nicki Minaj, Doja Cat, and Missy Elliott. Doechii has described her style of music as alternative hip hop, and credits Busta Rhymes for inspiring her expressive performance approach, stating, "There's so many different emotions that I feel like you don't have to emote in one way. Hip-hop gives you so much room to be animated. I'm a theater kid as well, so I like to create characters."

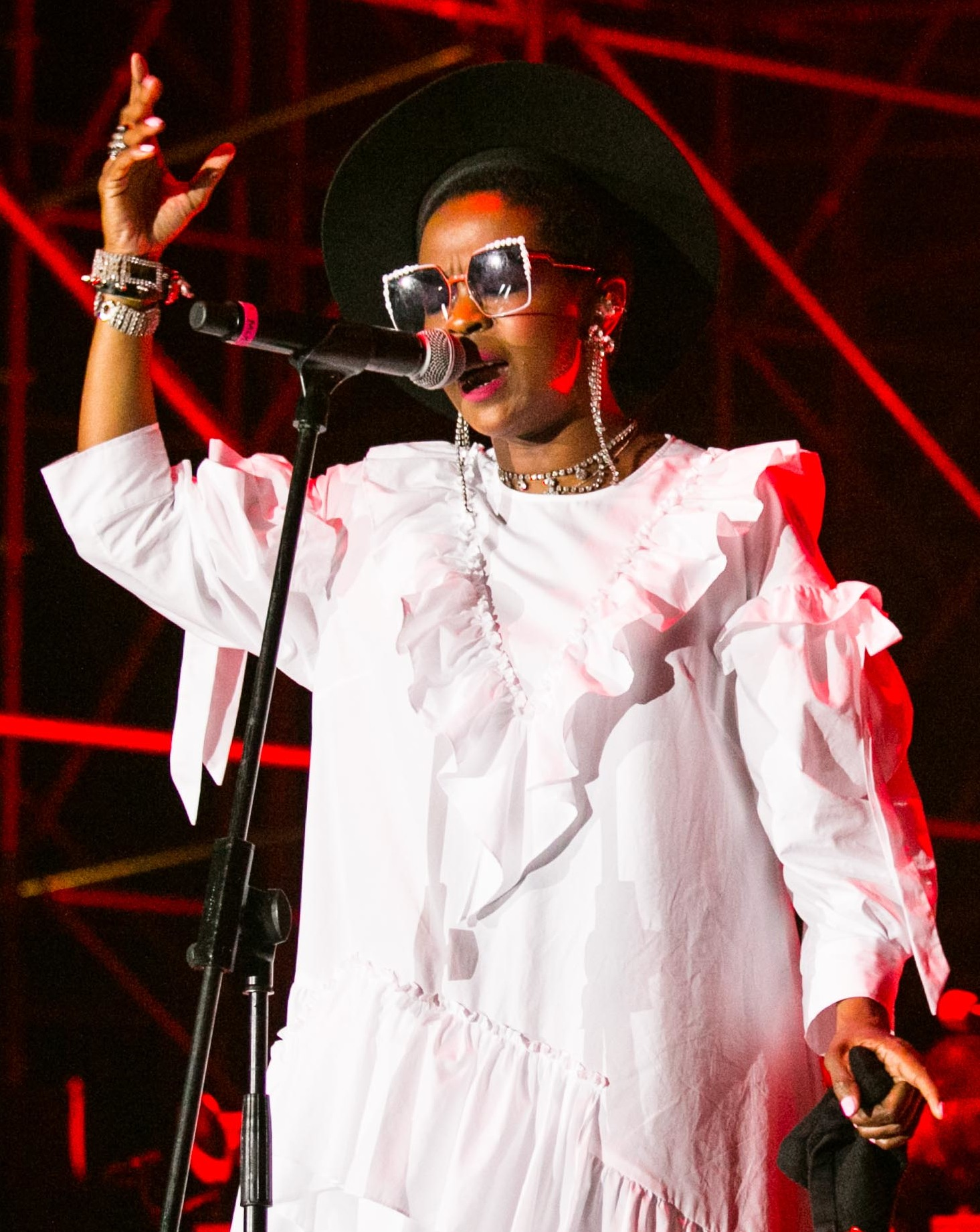
Doechii has cited Lauryn Hill as her biggest inspiration and "hero".

Doechii has cited Lauryn Hill as her biggest inspiration and referred to her as a hero, stating that she grew up listening to The Miseducation of Lauryn Hill and Hill's 2002 song "I Gotta Find Peace of Mind". Reflecting on Hill's influence, she said, "Listening to her all the time as my influence…I feel like it built this [understanding] that I have about resonating and being vulnerable in my music even though it can still bop. It can still rock". Her early viral track "Yucky Blucky Fruitcake" has drawn comparisons to the interludes on The Miseducation for its classroom-style introduction, in which a teacher figure prompts Doechii to introduce herself.

She has also named Nicki Minaj as a key influence, particularly on her rapping style, stating, "I always adored her and thought she was really incredible". In addition to Minaj, she has cited Kanye West, Tyler, the Creator, Kendrick Lamar, and SZA as her major musical influences, and expressed admiration for artists including Trick Daddy, Beyoncé, Eminem, Grace Jones, Paramore, Madonna, KRS-One, and MF Doom.

== Personal life ==
Doechii lived in New York City before the COVID-19 pandemic, during which she published YouTube vlogs about her daily life. As of 2022, she lives in Los Angeles.

Doechii said in a 2024 interview with Joe Budden that she had recently become sober following years of heavy drinking.

At the BET Awards 2025, Doechii condemned US President Donald Trump for "ruthless attacks", referring to military deployment during the June 2025 Los Angeles protests. She also stated her support for Black people, Latino people, trans people and Palestine.

Doechii came out as a lesbian in February 2026, having previously identified as bisexual.

== Discography ==
Mixtapes

- Coven Music Session, Vol. 1 (2019)
- Alligator Bites Never Heal (2024)

== Tours ==
Headlining

- Alligator Bites Never Heal Tour (2024)
- Live from the Swamp Tour (2025)

Supporting

- Doja Cat – The Scarlet Tour (2023)
- Kendrick Lamar & SZA – Grand National Tour (2025)

== Filmography ==
=== Film ===
Year	Title	Role	Ref
2023	Earth Mama	Trina	

=== Television ===
Year	Title	Role	Ref
2025	RuPaul's Drag Race	Herself	Season 17, episode 2; guest judge

== Awards and nominations ==
Organization	Year	Category	Nominated work	Result	Ref.
American Music Awards	2025	Social Song of the Year	"Anxiety"	Won	
American Music Awards	2025	Favorite Female Hip-Hop Artist (Note: Renamed to "Best Female Hip-Hop Artist" in 2026)	Herself	Nominated	
American Music Awards	2026	Favorite Female Hip-Hop Artist	Herself	Nominated	
American Scene Awards	2025	Music & Sound Recordings	"Anxiety"	Nominated	
Berlin Commercial Festival	2025	Best Music Video	"Denial Is a River"	Nominated	
Berlin Commercial Festival	2025	Craft: Costume Styling	"Denial Is a River"	Nominated	
Berlin Commercial Festival	2025	Craft: Idea	"Denial Is a River"	Won	
Berlin Commercial Festival	2025	Craft: Production Design	"Denial Is a River"	Nominated	
Berlin Commercial Festival	2025	Craft: Colour Grading	"Anxiety"	Won	
Berlin Commercial Festival	2026	Best Music Video	"Runway" (with Lady Gaga)	Nominated	
Berlin Commercial Festival	2026	Craft: Costume Styling	"Runway" (with Lady Gaga)	Won	
Berlin Commercial Festival	2026	Craft: Editing	"Runway" (with Lady Gaga)	Nominated	
Berlin Commercial Festival	2026	Craft: Idea	"Runway" (with Lady Gaga)	Nominated	
Berlin Commercial Festival	2026	Craft: Production Design	"Runway" (with Lady Gaga)	Nominated	
BET Awards	2023	Best New Artist	Herself	Nominated	
BET Awards	2025	Album of the Year	Alligator Bites Never Heal	Nominated	
BET Awards	2025	Video of the Year	"Denial Is a River"	Nominated	
BET Awards	2025	Viewer's Choice	"Denial Is a River"	Nominated	
BET Awards	2025	Best Collaboration	"Alter Ego"	Nominated	
BET Awards	2025	Best Female Hip Hop Artist	Herself	Won	
BET Awards	2025	BET Her Award	"Bloom"	Nominated	
BET Awards	2026	BET Her Award	"Girl, Get Up" (with SZA)	Won	
BET Awards	2026	Video of the Year	"Anxiety"	Nominated	
BET Awards	2026	Best Female Hip Hop Artist	Herself	Nominated	
BET Awards	2026	Fashion Vanguard Award	Herself	Nominated	
BET Hip Hop Awards	2023	Best Breakthrough Hip Hop Artist	Herself	Nominated	
Billboard Women in Music	2023	Rising Star	Herself	Won	
Billboard Women in Music	2025	Woman of the Year	Herself	Won	
BreakTudo Awards	2025	International Female Artist	Herself	Nominated	
BreakTudo Awards	2025	International Collaboration of the Year	"I'm His, He's Mine" (with Katy Perry)	Nominated	
BreakTudo Awards	2025	International Hit of the Year	"Anxiety"	Nominated	
BreakTudo Awards	2026	International Music Video	"Runway" (with Lady Gaga)	Pending	
GLAAD Media Awards	2023	Outstanding Breakthrough Music Artist	Herself	Nominated	
GLAAD Media Awards	2025	Outstanding Music Artist	Herself	Won	
Grammy Awards	2025	Best New Artist	Herself	Nominated	
Grammy Awards	2025	Best Rap Performance	"Nissan Altima"	Nominated	
Grammy Awards	2025	Best Rap Album	Alligator Bites Never Heal	Won	
Grammy Awards	2026	Record of the Year	"Anxiety"	Nominated	
Grammy Awards	2026	Song of the Year	"Anxiety"	Nominated	
Grammy Awards	2026	Best Rap Performance	"Anxiety"	Nominated	
Grammy Awards	2026	Best Rap Song	"Anxiety"	Nominated	
Grammy Awards	2026	Best Music Video	"Anxiety"	Won	
Grammy Awards	2027	Best Pop Duo/Group Performance	"Runway" (with Lady Gaga)	Pending	
Grammy Awards	2027	Best Song Written for Visual Media	"Runway" (with Lady Gaga)	Pending	
Grammy Awards	2027	Best Melodic Rap Performance	"Girl, Get Up"	Pending	
Grammy Awards	2027	Best Rap Song	"Girl, Get Up"	Pending	
iHeartRadio Music Awards	2024	Best New Pop Artist	Herself	Nominated	
iHeartRadio Music Awards	2024	Best New Hip-Hop Artist	Herself	Nominated	
iHeartRadio Music Awards	2024	TikTok Bop of the Year	"What It Is (Solo Version)"	Nominated	
iHeartRadio Music Awards	2026	Song of the Year	"Anxiety"	Nominated	
iHeartRadio Music Awards	2026	Best Lyrics	"Anxiety"	Nominated	
iHeartRadio Music Awards	2026	Favorite K-pop Collab	"ExtraL" (with Jennie)	Nominated	
Las Culturistas Culture Awards	2025	Best Vibe, Hands Down	Herself	Nominated	
MAMA Awards	2025	Best Collaboration	"ExtraL" (with Jennie)	Nominated	
MAMA Awards	2025	Song of the Year	"ExtraL" (with Jennie)	Nominated	
MTV Video Music Awards	2022	Push Performance of the Year	"Persuasive"	Nominated	
MTV Video Music Awards	2023	Song of Summer	"What It Is (Block Boy)" (featuring Kodak Black)	Nominated	
MTV Video Music Awards	2025	Song of the Year	"Anxiety"	Nominated	
MTV Video Music Awards	2025	Best Hip Hop	"Anxiety"	Won	
MTV Video Music Awards	2025	Video for Good	"Anxiety"	Nominated	
MTV Video Music Awards	2025	Best Choreography	"Anxiety"	Won	
MTV Video Music Awards	2026	Best Dance	"Runway" (with Lady Gaga)	Nominated	
MTV Video Music Awards	2026	Best Art Direction	"Runway" (with Lady Gaga)	Nominated	
MTV Europe Music Awards	2022	Best Push Act	Herself	Nominated	
Music Awards Japan	2026	Best International Hip Hop/Rap Song in Japan	"Anxiety"	Nominated	
Music Awards Japan	2026	Best International Hip Hop/Rap Song in Japan	"ExtraL" (with Jennie)	Nominated	
Music Awards Japan	2026	Best of Listeners' Choice: International Song	"ExtraL" (with Jennie)	Nominated	
NAACP Image Awards	2025	Outstanding New Artist	Herself	Won	
NAACP Image Awards	2025	Outstanding Female Artist	Herself	Nominated	
NAACP Image Awards	2025	Outstanding Music Video/Visual Album	"Alter Ego (ALTERnate Version)" (featuring JT)	Nominated	
NAACP Image Awards	2025	Outstanding Album	Alligator Bites Never Heal	Nominated	
NAACP Image Awards	2026	Entertainer of the Year	Herself	Nominated	
NAACP Image Awards	2026	Outstanding Female Artist	Herself	Nominated	
NAACP Image Awards	2026	Outstanding Hip Hop/Rap Song	"Anxiety"	Nominated	
NAACP Image Awards	2026	Outstanding Music Video/Visual Album	"Anxiety"	Nominated	
Nickelodeon Kids' Choice Awards	2026	Favorite Song from a Movie	"Runway" (with Lady Gaga)	Nominated	
Soul Train Music Awards	2022	Herself	Best New Artist	Nominated	
Soul Train Music Awards	2022	Best Dance Performance	"Persuasive"	Nominated	
Streamy Awards	2023	Sound of the Year	"What It Is (Block Boy)"	Nominated	
UK Music Video Awards	2022	Best Hip Hop/Grime/Rap Video – International	"Crazy"	Nominated	
UK Music Video Awards	2022	Best Choreography in a Video	"Crazy"	Won	
UK Music Video Awards	2022	Best Cinematography in a Video	"Crazy"	Nominated	
UK Music Video Awards	2025	Best Hip Hop/Grime/Rap Video – International	"Denial Is a River"	Nominated	
UK Music Video Awards	2025	Best Hip Hop/Grime/Rap Video – International	"Anxiety"	Nominated	
UK Music Video Awards	2025	Best Performance in a Video	"Anxiety"	Nominated	
UK Music Video Awards	2025	Best Performance in a Video	"Denial Is a River"	Won	
