= DJ Miss Milan =

- Also known as: The Fairy Vibe Mother
- Origin: Queens, New York, U.S.
- Years active: 2015–present
- Label: Top Dawg

DJ Miss Milan is an American DJ and producer. She has performed with artists such as Justine Skye, Saweetie and SZA, and worked with artists such as Beyoncé, Combat Jack, Doja Cat, and DJ Khaled. Her most prominent partnership is with Doechii, for whom she is her official DJ. Her work with Doechii includes the song "Boom Bap" on Alligator Bites Never Heal, which won Best Rap Album at the 67th Annual Grammy Awards. She is also the founder of EMPWR Beats. She is currently signed with Top Dawg Entertainment.

== Biography ==
=== Early life ===
DJ Miss Milan was born in Brooklyn, New York and raised in Queens. She is of Barbadian and Guyanese descent. Her parent's Caribbean roots partly inspired her interest in music from an early age. Milan was raised by her grandparents as her mother could not care for her at that time. She bought her first DJ equipment at a pawn shop while working 2 jobs and living with her grandmother. She left her job at the time in 2017 to dedicate herself to DJing.

She initially played small gatherings and functions, but transitioned to clubs and larger venues as time went on. Her inspirations include DJ Cocoa Chanelle, Mister Cee, DJ Jazzy Joyce, Kid Capri, and DJ Spinderella. Mister Cee in particular became a mentor to DJ Miss Milan and referred to her as him "in final form".

=== Career ===
DJ Miss Milan performed with Saweetie in the late 2010s and early 2020s. She and Doechii met in 2020 after Milan included Doechii in a playlist called GIRLGVNG RAP that she created in 2019 to feature more underground female artists, to which Doechii reached out via social media to thank her for the inclusion. At the time, Milan was already deejaying for Saweetie, but took the chance and left to work with Doechii. They began to work together in 2020, first performing together at the Move Forward festival in Brooklyn. She has performed with Doechii on tour, at Coachella, at the Grammys, and on Tiny Desk Concerts. She co-produced the song "Boom Bap" on Doechii's 2024 album Alligator Bites Never Heal, which won Best Rap Album at the 67th Annual Grammy Awards. Their partnership has been cited by publications such as BET as a prime example of a recent female rapper-DJ duo.

She has also DJed for events and programs for Audiomack, Variety, and Uncommon Sense with Charlamagne. She also was a supporting act for Doja Cat on The Scarlet Tour and performed alongside Connie Diiamond, Justine Skye, and SZA. She also opened for Beyoncé alongside DJ Khaled during the Renaissance World Tour in 2023. Milan has also performed on radio stations such as Hot 97 and SiriusXM. In 2026, she will perform at Roots Picnic.

In addition to music, she advocates for LGBT+ people and women. She founded the mentorship program EMPWR Beats to empower female DJs in the largely male-dominated field. She also founded the GIRLGVNG Global platform. She also has hosted her own DJing events, such as her Club Renaissance events in Brooklyn.

=== Personal life ===
DJ Miss Milan moved to Atlanta during the COVID-19 pandemic. She considers herself to be spiritual, and is sober.
