= Alligator Bites Never Heal =

2024 mixtape by Doechii

Mixtape by Doechii
- Released: August 30, 2024
- Recorded: 2024
- Studios: Hardpink (Los Angeles); TDE (Los Angeles); Mix Room (Burbank); North Track (Los Angeles); Swamp (Atlanta and Miami); Paramount Encore (Los Angeles); Quad (Manhattan)
- Genre: Hip-hop
- Length: 46:53
- Labels: Top Dawg; Capitol
- Producers: Aaronmac; Andreas; Ar13l; Banser; Banshee the Great; Monte Booker; Camper; Childish Major; DaedaePivot; Devin Malik; Dylvinci; Foreign Teck; Mike Hector; Ian James; Joey Hamhock; Jayda Love; Kal Banx; Keanu; Kid Soul; KND; Mai; Malik Ninety Five; Sader; Super Miles; Stoic; Henry Was; Zaybans

Doechii chronology
She / Her / Black Bitch (2022)	Alligator Bites Never Heal (2024)

Singles from Alligator Bites Never Heal
- 1. "Nissan Altima" Released: August 2, 2024; 2. "Boom Bap" Released: August 23, 2024; 3. "Denial Is a River" Released: January 28, 2025

Alligator Bites Never Heal is the second mixtape by the American rapper Doechii, released on August 30, 2024, through Top Dawg Entertainment and Capitol Records. It was supported by the singles "Nissan Altima", "Boom Bap", and "Denial Is a River". Other tracks include "Boiled Peanuts" and "Catfish". The mixtape features production from a variety of producers including Banser, Camper, Childish Major, Kal Banx, Devin Malik, Monte Booker, and DaedaePivot from Pivot Gang, as well as a guest appearance from rapper Kuntfetish. It is the first mixtape released by Top Dawg since Jay Rock's Black Friday in 2010.

Alligator Bites Never Heal was met with critical acclaim from critics which led to a Best Rap Album win at the 67th Annual Grammy Awards, while its lead single "Nissan Altima" received a nomination for Best Rap Performance and Doechii herself earned a nomination for Best New Artist.

== Background and promotion ==
After finding viral success on TikTok with her single "Yucky Blucky Fruitcake" in 2021, Doechii was signed to Top Dawg Entertainment and Capitol Records in March 2022, becoming the first female rapper signed to the former. In August of that year, she released her second EP and first major-label record, She / Her / Black Bitch, featuring a remix of the single "Persuasive" with TDE label mate SZA.

While promoting the EP in 2022, Doechii stated in an interview with Rolling Stone that she was working on her debut album, which included studio sessions with Pharrell Williams and Babyface. After achieving her first entry on the Billboard Hot 100 with the single "What It Is (Block Boy)" featuring Kodak Black, she stated in an August 2023 interview with PopSugar that she "just came back from Jamaica finishing [her debut album]," and alluded to releasing it before supporting Doja Cat on The Scarlet Tour. However, no official release date was announced. She continued to regularly release standalone singles, including "Pacer" in September and "Alter Ego" featuring JT in March of the following year.

On July 12, 2024, Doechii began releasing a series titled Swamp Sessions through social media; these were short songs that were written and recorded in hour-long periods, each accompanied by a music video. The third Swamp Sessions installment, titled "Nissan Altima", was released onto Instagram and YouTube on July 27, 2024, and would be released on streaming platforms almost a week later on August 2.

On August 14, 2024, Doechii's 26th birthday, Alligator Bites Never Heal was officially announced as her first mixtape released by major label, with the track list being revealed six days later on August 20. Three days later, the sixth and final Swamp Sessions installment, titled "Boom Bap", was released as the second single. "Denial Is a River" was released to rhythmic contemporary radio stations as the mixtape's third single on January 14, 2025. "Anxiety", released on March 4, 2025, was added to the digital reissue as the fourth single.

On August 3, 2025, Doechii announced the "Live from the Swamp Tour" in support of the mixtape during her Lollapalooza performance. Her debut headlining tour, it is scheduled to run from October to November 2025.

== Title and artwork ==
Doechii described the concept behind the title in a statement posted to Instagram accompanying the mixtape's announcement:

The alligator performs a spinning maneuver known as the "death roll" to submerge and dismember its prey underwater. This past year I've grappled with what felt like a relentless death roll in my life... A dance of drowning in my own vices, battling differences with my label and a creative numbness that broke me. [...] In my research about alligator attacks, I found that a common thread in each survivor was that the main reason they survived is because they fought back. This mixtape is my fight back. I am nobody's prey; I was born to be the predator.

Additionally, the American alligator is the official state reptile of Doechii's native Florida, and is known to inhabit swamps, thus making the title a tribute to Doechii's home state, and to her nickname, the "Swamp Princess".

The cover art shows Doechii sitting on a chair holding an albino alligator named Coconut, currently housed at The Reptile Zoo in Fountain Valley, California. The cover was shot by Los Angeles-based photographer John Jay. It is a reference to the cover of Minnie Riperton's 1975 album Adventures in Paradise.

== Commercial performance ==
Alligator Bites Never Heal met some success worldwide following Doechii's performance in the 67th Annual Grammy Awards but also due to TikTok trends, which contributed to the success of "Denial Is a River", but also "Anxiety". The mixtape peaked at number ten on the US Billboard 200, becoming Doechii's first ever album to reaching the top ten in the United States. Alligator Bites Never Heal also reached the top ten in Germany and Scotland, top twenty in Canada, the Netherlands, New Zealand, Switzerland and Wallonia, top thirty in Australia, Croatia, Denmark and France, and top forty in Austria, Finland, Italy, Norway and the United Kingdom.

== Critical reception ==
Professional ratings
Aggregate scores
Source	Rating
Metacritic	79/100
Review scores
Source	Rating
AllMusic	4/5 stars
Clash	7/10
NME	4/5 stars
Pitchfork	7.0/10
Rolling Stone	4/5 stars

According to the review aggregator Metacritic, Alligator Bites Never Heal received "generally favorable reviews" based on a weighted average score of 79 out of 100 from 6 critic scores. Doechii's stylistic versatility received particular attention, with Mankaprr Conteh of Rolling Stone identifying boom bap, EDM, and soul elements appearing at various points on the project. Though many critics felt favorably about this versatility, Clash's Ana Lamond was more reserved in her appraisal, remarking that "the tracklist becomes a victim of its own length" during the more R&B-influenced songs. Doechii's writing throughout the mixtape was also commended: Conteh stated that she displayed "a wicked pen and brilliant charisma", and Kyann-Sian Williams of NME described her as a "witty, comical songwriter". Doechii's attempts to establish a position within the music industry have been identified as among the mixtape's primary themes. Williams noted that she discusses "industry politics and label demands" on the project, and described a "sense of being trapped or feeling inadequate" on many of its tracks; Lamond remarked that Doechii portrayed herself as torn between "personal relationships, vices, self-worth, and perceived success".

The song "Denial Is a River" was named by multiple critics as a highlight of Alligator Bites Never Heal: Lamond opined that the track "unveils Doechii at her best", and Conteh called it "an immaculate display of her quirks, relatability, and tenderness". The single "Boom Bap" also achieved praise for its lyrics, in which Doechii was perceived as criticizing traditionalists' views of how hip hop should sound.

=== Year-end lists ===
Critics' year-end rankings of Alligator Bites Never Heal
Publication	List	Rank	Ref.
BrooklynVegan	Top 50 Albums of 2024	19	
Exclaim!	50 Best Albums of 2024	23	
NPR	The 50 Best Albums of 2024	—N/a	
Paste	The 100 Best Albums of 2024	99	
Rolling Stone	The 100 Best Albums of 2024	9	
Stereogum	The 50 Best Albums of 2024	9	

== Track listing ==
Alligator Bites Never Heal track listing
No.	Title	Writer(s)	Producer(s)	Length
1.	"Stanka Pooh"	Jaylah Hickmon; Devin Williams; Kalon Berry; Miles Franklin	Devin Malik; Kal Banx; Super Miles	2:01
2.	"Bullfrog"	Hickmon; Matthew Bartolo Moleta; Mai Ankri	Stoic; Mai	1:34
3.	"Boiled Peanuts"	Hickmon; Andreas Sorin Dumitru	Andreas; Joey Hamhock^{[a]}	2:01
4.	"Denial Is a River"	Hickmon; James Ian Anderson; Hamhock; Serban Sirbu	Ian James; Hamhock; Banser	2:39
5.	"Catfish"	Hickmon; Ahmanti Booker	Monte Booker	2:14
6.	"Skipp"	Hickmon; Booker	Booker	1:40
7.	"Hide n Seek"	Hickmon; Berry; Michael Hernandez	Kal Banx; Foreign Teck	2:29
8.	"Bloom"	Hickmon; Jayda Love; Matthew Hawkins; Xavier Beard	Love; Aaronmac; Zaybans	2:13
9.	"Wait"	Hickmon; Henry Was; Rudy Dylan James	Was; Dylvinci	3:04
10.	"Death Roll"	Hickmon; Malik Sanders; Dylan C. Frank	Malik Ninety Five; DaedaePivot	2:19
11.	"Profit"	Hickmon; Mike Hector; David Duodu; Ahmad AliNur	Hector; KND; Kid Soul	1:35
12.	"Boom Bap"	Hickmon; Darhyl Camper; Darius Scott	Camper; DJ Miss Milan^{[a]}	2:10
13.	"Nissan Altima"	Hickmon; Markus Alandrus Randle	Childish Major	2:06
14.	"GTFO" (with Kuntfetish)	Hickmon; Williams; Kole Kimbro	Devin Malik; Andrew Boyd^{[v]}	2:40
15.	"Huh!"	Hickmon; Williams	Devin Malik; Boyd^{[v]}	2:16
16.	"Slide"	Hickmon; Berry; Keanu Torres; Solal Tong Cuong	Kal Banx; Banshee the Great; Keanu	2:54
17.	"Fireflies"	Hickmon; Booker; Taylor Alan Sader	Sader; Booker	4:25
18.	"Beverly Hills"	Hickmon; Williams	Devin Malik	3:38
19.	"Alligator Bites Never Heal"	Hickmon; Berry; Franklin; Austin Brown; Michael Thornwell Washington Jr.	Super Miles; Ar13l; Kal Banx^{[a]}; Brown^{[a]}	2:55
Total length:				46:53

Extended edition bonus track
No.	Title	Writer(s)	Producer(s)	Length
20.	"Anxiety"	Hickmon; Wally De Backer; Luiz Bonfá	Doechii	4:09
Total length:				51:02

=== Notes ===
- ^{^[a]} signifies an additional producer.
- ^{^[v]} signifies a vocal producer.
- "Boiled Peanuts" contains an interpolation from "Jamie's Revenge", written by John Carbonella, Michael Joseph Deller, Jared M. Tankel, Andrew Greene, and Thomas Brenneck, and performed by Los Sospechos.
- "Denial Is a River" contains an interpolation from "Fists of the White Lotus", written by Joseph Thompson and performed by Paul Nice.
- "Skipp" contains a sample of "25 Lighters", written and performed by DJ DMD, Fat Pat, and Lil' Keke.
- "GTFO" contains an interpolation from "Move Bitch" written by Jonathan Smith, Michael Tyler, Bobby Sandimanie, and Craig Lawson, and performed by Ludacris featuring Mystikal and I-20.
- "Anxiety" contains a sample of "Somebody That I Used to Know", written by Wally De Backer, and performed by Gotye featuring Kimbra; which itself contains a sample of "Seville", written and performed by Luiz Bonfá.

== Personnel ==
Credits adapted from the album's liner notes and Tidal.

- Doechii – vocals (all tracks), recording (tracks 8, 17), mixing (8), creative direction
- Jayda Love – recording (1–5, 9, 10, 12–15, 17, 20), mixing (1–10, 12–14, 16–20), additional engineering (11)
- Bryan Schwaller – recording (7, 12), mixing (3, 5, 6, 11, 12, 15, 19), additional vocals (12)
- BMar – recording (6)
- Jeff Ramzy – recording (11)
- Noah Shanklin – recording (16, 18)
- Lizzie Robson – recording (16)
- James "Slice" Russell – additional mixing (14)
- Julian Sintonia – mixing assistance (3); additional vocals, additional recording (14)
- Randy "Hoot" Brown – mixing assistance (6, 7, 9)
- Ricky Surum – mixing assistance (13)
- Nicolas De Porcel – mastering
- Demitrius Lewis II – mastering assistance
- 65 – additional recording (14)
- Mike Thornwell – additional vocals (9, 10, 19)
- Kid Soul – additional vocals (11)
- Dixson – additional vocals (12)
- Darhyl Camper – additional vocals (12)
- DJ Miss Milan – additional vocals (12)
- Alysia Cortez – additional vocals (12)
- Sam Contrerass – additional vocals (12)
- Moosa Tiffith – creative direction
- John Jay – photography
- Dann Gilbuena – packaging design
- Michael Lewis – packaging design

== Charts ==
=== Weekly charts ===
2024 weekly chart performance for Alligator Bites Never Heal
Chart (2024)	Peak position
UK Album Downloads (Official Charts)	54
US Billboard 200	82
US Top R&B/Hip-Hop Albums (Billboard)	26

2025 weekly chart performance for Alligator Bites Never Heal
Chart (2025)	Peak position
Australian Albums (ARIA)	29
Australian Hip Hop/R&B Albums (ARIA)	6
Austrian Albums (Ö3 Austria)	33
Belgian Albums (Ultratop Flanders)	15
Belgian Albums (Ultratop Wallonia)	85
Canadian Albums (Billboard)	13
Croatian International Albums (HDU)	15
Danish Albums (Hitlisten)	25
Dutch Albums (Album Top 100)	19
Finnish Albums (Suomen virallinen lista)	38
French Albums (SNEP)	27
German Albums (Offizielle Top 100)	10
Greek Albums (IFPI)	14
Icelandic Albums (Tónlistinn)	31
Irish Albums (Official Charts)	40
Italian Albums (FIMI)	35
Japanese Dance & Soul Albums (Oricon)	13
Lithuanian Albums (AGATA)	27
New Zealand Albums (RMNZ)	19
Norwegian Albums (VG-lista)	38
Scottish Albums (Official Charts)	6
Spanish Albums (Promusicae)	62
Swedish Physical Albums (Sverigetopplistan)	19
Swiss Albums (Schweizer Hitparade)	12
UK Albums (Official Charts)	40
UK R&B Albums (Official Charts)	1
US Billboard 200	10
US Top R&B/Hip-Hop Albums (Billboard)	5

=== Monthly charts ===
Monthly chart performance for Alligator Bites Never Heal
Chart (2025)	Position
Japanese Dance & Soul Albums (Oricon)	18

=== Year-end charts ===
Year-end chart performance for Alligator Bites Never Heal
Chart (2025)	Position
Australian Albums (ARIA)	71
Belgian Albums (Ultratop Flanders)	148
New Zealand Albums (RMNZ)	50
US Billboard 200	83
US Top R&B/Hip-Hop Albums (Billboard)	31

== Certifications ==
Certifications for Alligator Bites Never Heal
Region	Certification	Certified units/sales
Belgium (BRMA)	Gold	10,000^{‡}
Canada (Music Canada)	Gold	40,000^{‡}
France (SNEP)	Gold	50,000^{‡}
New Zealand (RMNZ)	Gold	7,500^{‡}
Poland (ZPAV)	Gold	15,000^{‡}
United Kingdom (BPI)	Silver	60,000^{‡}
United States (RIAA)	Gold	500,000^{‡}
^{‡} Sales+streaming figures based on certification alone.

== Release history ==
Release dates and formats for Alligator Bites Never Heal
Initial release date	Edition(s)	Format(s)	References
August 30, 2024	Standard	Digital download; streaming	
November 8, 2024	Standard	Vinyl LP	
March 14, 2025	Extended	Digital download; streaming	
April 18, 2025	Standard	CD	
May 9, 2025	Standard	Cassette	
