= Still Sleep? =

Studio album by Sleepy Hallow
- Released: June 2, 2021
- Length: 34:02
- Label: Winners Circle; RCA
- Producer: Great John

Sleepy Hallow chronology
Sleepy Hallow Presents: Sleepy for President (2020)	Still Sleep? (2021)	Boy Meets World (2023)

Singles from Still Sleep?
- 1. "Tip Toe" Released: August 12, 2020; 2. "2055" Released: April 14, 2021

Still Sleep? is the debut studio album by American rapper Sleepy Hallow, released on June 2, 2021, through Winners Circle Entertainment and RCA Records. It was produced by Great John and includes the singles "Tip Toe" (with Sheff G) and "2055".

== Critical reception ==
Professional ratings
Review scores
Source	Rating
AllMusic	3.5/5 stars
HipHopDX	3.4/5

Fred Thomas of AllMusic wrote that Still Sleep? "continues [Sleepy Hallow's] expansions from standard trap and drill production into more musically adventurous territory", highlighting "2 Sauce" and "Chicken" and complimenting the "upgraded production and lessons learned" from "Deep End Freestyle". Vivian Medithi of HipHopDX found it to be "a laid-back album" as well as "loose-limbed and unconcerned with making a major artistic statement, opting instead to let Sleepy and mainstay producer Great John explore sounds beyond Brooklyn drill".

== Track listing ==
Still Sleep? track listing
No.	Title	Length
1.	"Basketball Dreams (Intro)"	1:31
2.	"2 Sauce"	3:08
3.	"4or Daze"	2:33
4.	"2055"	2:03
5.	"Make You (Snake Proof)"	1:58
6.	"Equal"	3:02
7.	"Scrub"	2:52
8.	"Sleepy Freestyle"	2:15
9.	"Chicken"	2:09
10.	"Mi No Sabe"	1:18
11.	"1999"	3:28
12.	"Murda She Wrote (Outro)"	2:06
13.	"Low Key" (bonus track)	2:38
14.	"Tip Toe" (with Sheff G; bonus track)	3:01
Total length:		34:02

== Charts ==
Chart performance for Still Sleep?
Chart (2021)	Peak position
Australian Albums (ARIA)	90
Canadian Albums (Billboard)	15
Danish Albums (Hitlisten)	38
Dutch Albums (Album Top 100)	86
New Zealand Albums (RMNZ)	39
Swedish Albums (Sverigetopplistan)	50
US Billboard 200	16
US Top R&B/Hip-Hop Albums (Billboard)	10

== Certifications ==
Certifications for Still Sleep?
Region	Certification	Certified units/sales
Canada (Music Canada)	Gold	40,000^{‡}
Denmark (IFPI Danmark)	Gold	10,000^{‡}
New Zealand (RMNZ)	Gold	7,500^{‡}
United Kingdom (BPI)	Silver	60,000^{‡}
United States (RIAA)	Gold	500,000^{‡}
^{‡} Sales+streaming figures based on certification alone.
