= Bobby Bitch =

Single by Bobby Shmurda

from the EP Shmurda She Wrote
- Released: September 30, 2014
- Recorded: 2014
- Genre: Gangsta rap; hardcore hip-hop; trap
- Length: 2:40
- Label: Epic; GS9
- Songwriter: Ackquille Pollard
- Producer: Dondre Dennis

Bobby Shmurda singles chronology
"Hot Nigga" (2014)	"Bobby Bitch" (2014)	"Stoopid" (2018)

Music video
- "Bobby Bitch" music video on YouTube

"Bobby Bitch" is the second single by American rapper Bobby Shmurda. The song is produced by Dondre Dennis. It was released for digital download on September 30, 2014 by Epic Records and GS9, as the second single from Shmurda's debut EP Shmurda She Wrote. The official remix features Rowdy Rebel and Rich the Kid. Some of the vocals of the song were sampled in XXXTentacion's song, "I Love It When They Run".

== Music video ==
The official music video was uploaded to Shmurda's Vevo account on Friday November 7, 2014.

== Charts ==
Chart (2014)	Peak position
US Billboard Hot 100	92
US Hot R&B/Hip-Hop Songs (Billboard)	25

== Certifications ==
Region	Certification	Certified units/sales
United States (RIAA)	Platinum	1,000,000^{‡}
^{‡} Sales+streaming figures based on certification alone.
