= Bodboy =

EP by Bobby Shmurda
- Released: August 5, 2022
- Recorded: 2021–2022
- Genre: Hip-hop
- Length: 19:04
- Label: GS9; ONErpm

Bobby Shmurda chronology
Shmurda She Wrote (2014)	Bodboy (2022)

Singles from Bodboy
- 1. "Hoochie Daddy" Released: July 15, 2022

Professional ratings
Review scores
Source	Rating
HipHopDX	2.4/5
Pitchfork	5.7/10

Bodboy is the second EP by American rapper Bobby Shmurda; it was released on August 5, 2022 by GS9 Records and ONErpm. The EP contains guest appearances by Fat Tony and Rowdy Rebel. It is Shmurda's first project since his release from prison in February 2021 and comes nearly eight years after his last release, Shmurda She Wrote (2014). The EP was planned as a warm-up for Shmurda's debut studio album, Ready to Live, which was scheduled for release in 2023 but has not been released as of May 2026.

== Singles and promotion ==
On July 15, 2022, the EP's debut single, "Hoochie Daddy", was released. On July 24, Shmurda announced the EP and its release date after sharing the music video for "Hoochie Daddy".

== Track listing ==
Bodboy track listing
No.	Title	Producer(s)	Length
1.	"Whole Brick"	Rico Beats	2:23
2.	"From the Slums"	Outtakey; AyyKash	2:12
3.	"Hoochie Daddy"	PoWR Trav; Jaystolaa; Beat Demons; SSJ9K	2:30
4.	"Gorilla"	Cashout Beats; Aloy; JT	1:55
5.	"No Sense"	Fast Life Beats; Marko Lenz; Looisey; Cutz	1:35
6.	"Glock Inside" (featuring Fat Tony)	No Style	2:34
7.	"R S N"	Legacy Beatzz; Splited Stupid; prodtwo	1:41
8.	"Bodmon"	Nick Papz; KJ	2:18
9.	"On God" (featuring Rowdy Rebel)	TM88; Akachi; Sonickaboom; Gohan; Slo Meezy	1:56
Total length:			19:04
