= Shmurda =

Shmurda may refer to

- Bobby Shmurda (Ackquille Jean Pollard, born 1994), American rapper
  - Shmurda She Wrote, debut EP by Bobby Shmurda
