= Sheff G =

American rapper (born 1998)

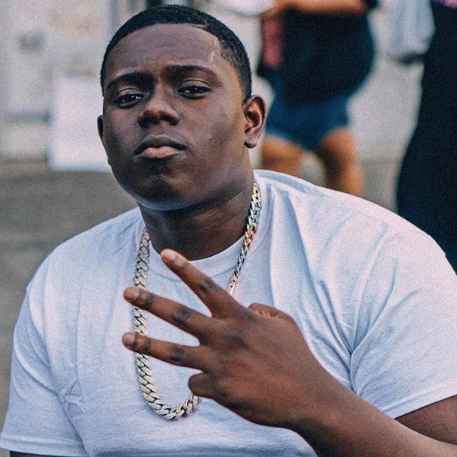
- Sheff G in 2020

Background information
- Born: Michael Kyle Williams; September 23, 1998 (age 27); Brooklyn, New York City, U.S.
- Genres: East Coast hip hop; Brooklyn drill
- Occupations: Rapper; songwriter
- Instrument: Vocals
- Years active: 2017–2025
- Labels: Winners Circle; RCA
- Website: winnerscirclestore.com

Michael Kyle Williams (born September 23, 1998), known professionally as Sheff G, is an American rapper. He rose to fame with his 2017 single "No Suburban", which was a response to the song "Suburban" by 22Gz. 22Gz responded with a song titled "Retaliation", and Sheff G responded with "No Suburban Pt.2 Williams is widely known as one of the vanguards of the Brooklyn drill movement. On May 16, 2023, Williams was indicted with 31 other purported gang members responsible for several shooting incidents and at least one murder over a two-year span.

== Early life ==
Michael Williams was born on September 23, 1998, in Brooklyn, New York City, to a Trinidadian mother and Haitian father. He was raised in the Flatbush section of Brooklyn. He was influenced and inspired to rap by listening to The Notorious B.I.G. and Chicago drill rappers like Lil Bibby and Chief Keef.

Before getting into music, Sheff G joined the 83 (Eight Trey) Gangsta Crips at age 12, and was imprisoned for 2 years for a felony gun charge. In 2015, he went back to prison for robbery for two years. Williams was released from prison in 2017. When asked about his childhood before rap, Williams said: "Growing up, all I was around was violence, in school, or hanging with my niggas, it was rough in the streets. I had to be protected out there, so I rolled with the 83s, we was in Flatbush especially on my block, I was a block baby you heard like niggas kno my body. I would never think rapping would be in my future. I remember in 2014, at 15, we was growing up watching GS9 the G-Stone Crips get big, and they from the 90s on the East side, and I would be like 'damn, imagine I'm like that.' But it was a dream then."

== Music career ==
In 2017, his single "No Suburban (produced by AXL Beats)" went viral and he was credited as one of the pioneers of the Brooklyn drill music movement. He made a remix of "No Suburban" with GS9 affiliate rapper Corey Finesse.

Sheff G, Sleepy Hallow and Corey Finesse were previously managed by former NFL football player, Junior Galette's NuLa Entertainment.

In 2019, he released his mixtape called The Unluccy Luccy Kid. His label Winners Circle Entertainment was founded in the same year.

In May 2020, he released his debut studio album called One and Only. His single "No Suburban, Pt. 2" went viral with over 21 million streams. It was later certified Gold by RIAA in 2022.

On July 17, 2020, he released his EP Just 4 Yall, composed by five songs which includes songs "Picasso" feat Chicago drill rapper King Von, Jay Critch and Eli Fross; "Say That" ft Rich The Kid; and "Make It Happen" ft Sleepy Hallow.

In August 2020, Winners Circle Entertainment began a partnership with RCA Records. Sheff G and Sleepy Hallow released the single "Tip Toe" produced by Great John, using a sample of Tiny Tim's version of "Tiptoe Through the Tulips". It was the second Sheff G single to be certified Gold by RIAA.

In December 2020, Sheff G was named "Up Now" by music streaming service Audiomack. "Audiomack has always been another platform for me to get to know new fans," Sheff G said regarding his selection for #UpNow. "So it has helped me expand. It's a great feeling."

On December 16, 2020, he released the mixtape Proud Of Me Now. Throughout 2021, a multitude of singles would release including "On Go" featuring Polo G in July and "Run It Up" featuring Sleepy Hallow and A Boogie Wit da Hoodie in August.

On July 14, 2022, he released his album called From the Can. It contained 12 songs with features from Sleepy Hallow, A Boogie Wit da Hoodie, Polo G, Fivio Foreign, Rowdy Rebel, and Jay Bezzy.

== Legal issues ==
In high school, Williams was arrested and went on probation after firing gunshots at Brooklyn's Kings Plaza. One week before he turned 16, in 2014, he was arrested for the first time and booked in for fighting.

On November 19, 2015, Williams was incarcerated for one year and four months in jail for a felony gun charge and robbery. Williams also stated the last time he was incarcerated was in October 2017 to January 2018, a brief stint which he explains was the reason for his break on music.

On July 15, 2021, Williams was arrested in New York City, New York for second-degree gun possession. His bail was remanded, meaning he sat behind bars until his court hearing on August 18, 2021. He pleaded guilty on October 20, 2021, and was sentenced to two years in prison. He served his sentence at Bare Hill Correctional Facility and was slated for release on June 15, 2023.

On May 16, 2023, while serving his gun possession sentence, Williams was indicted along with 31 other alleged gang members including Sleepy Hallow for a multitude of gang conspiracy charges. He completed his sentence for the gun charge and then was held without bail for the conspiracy charges and was moved to Riker's Island. The judge then set a 10 million dollar bond and 1.5 million dollar cash bail for Williams on April 19, 2024. He paid it on the same day and was immediately released from custody.

In March 2025, Williams entered a plea deal and was sentenced to five years in prison for attempted murder and conspiracy charges. He hired prison consultant Craig Rothfeld.

== Political views ==
On May 23, 2024, Williams spoke at a Donald Trump rally in the Bronx, wherein he expressed support for him.
