= Anxiety (Doechii song) =

2025 single by Doechii

Single by Doechii

from the album Alligator Bites Never Heal (Extended)
- B-side: "Denial Is a River"
- Published: November 10, 2019 (YouTube)
- Released: March 4, 2025
- Recorded: 2019 (original); 2025 (re-record)
- Genre: Pop rap; hip hop
- Length: 4:09
- Label: Top Dawg; Capitol
- Songwriters: Jaylah Hickmon; Wally De Backer; Luiz Bonfá
- Producer: Doechii

Doechii singles chronology
"ExtraL" (2025)	"Anxiety" (2025)	"Timeless" (remix) (2025)

Original and physical cover

Music video
- "Anxiety" on YouTube

"Anxiety" is a standalone single by the American rapper and singer Doechii, who originally released it on YouTube on November 10, 2019. The song was re-recorded in 2025 after it began to gain traction on the social media platform TikTok, and it was released to streaming platforms on March 4, 2025, through Top Dawg Entertainment and Capitol Records. "Anxiety" prominently samples the instrumental of the 2011 song "Somebody That I Used to Know" by Gotye and Kimbra.

"Anxiety" peaked at number nine on the Billboard Hot 100, marking Doechii's first top ten hit in the United States. Outside of the United States, "Anxiety" topped the charts in Australia, Greece, Latvia, New Zealand, and Switzerland, and peaked within the top ten of the charts in various countries, including Romania, Austria, Germany, Ireland, Lithuania, France, Norway, and the United Kingdom, as well as on the Billboard Global 200. It is certified Diamond in France as well as Gold or higher in thirteen additional countries.

Following its release, it was added as a bonus track on Alligator Bites Never Heal (2024), and it is the final track on the extended version. A music video for the song was released in April 2025.

== Background and release ==
"Anxiety" was originally recorded by Doechii in 2019 during the sessions for her debut mixtape, Coven Music Sessions. She originally self-released the song on her YouTube channel on November 10, 2019.

On September 15, 2023, American rapper Sleepy Hallow released a song of the same title featuring Doechii as a single from his studio album, Boy Meets World, with the song's chorus containing a sample of Doechii's 2019 demo. In early 2025, Doechii's original recording of the song went viral on the social media platform TikTok. Subsequently, she posted a video to the platform to suggest that the formal release of "Anxiety" was forthcoming. On March 4, 2025, the official version of the song was released to streaming services, containing re-recorded vocals from the original demo she posted to YouTube.

== Composition ==
"Anxiety" is a pop rap song. It prominently samples the 2011 song "Somebody That I Used to Know" by Gotye featuring Kimbra, which in turn samples Luiz Bonfá's instrumental "Seville" (1967).

== Critical reception ==
Robin Murray of Clash wrote that the song "crosses multiple lands", stressing the "soul vocal, some revelatory lyricism, and hard-hitting flows" for which "the bluntest lines shine out". Murray also wrote that in the lyrics, the listener could find Doechii "working towards self-forgiveness, embracing a rounded maturity that can be lost amid the brash glare of the spotlight". Elias Andrews of HotNewHipHop wrote that in the 2025 version, the rapper "digs more into the nervy intensity of the single", appreciating the "irregular, somewhat goofy rhythm" from the sample because it "serves as a template for Doechii's vocal approach." Andrews also noted Doechii's versatility between rapping and singing, saying that "Anxiety" proves "that she do both masterfully". Rolling Stone's editorial staff included it in their mid-year list of the best songs of 2025, labelling it "an especially clear testament to the potency of her creative instincts" that "finds Doechii deploying a dexterous yet playful flow as she navigates interior feelings surrounding the emotion in the song’s title." Billboard followed suit, ranking it at 22, with Mackenzie Cummings-Grady regarding it as "one of 2025’s most adventurous pop songs" which "crosses multiple lands, from rap to pop to classical and back again", proclaiming "it encapsulates everything Doechii is a master at: slick pop melodies, fiery bars, and bringing oodles and oodles of charisma to the microphone."

By contrast, Paste listed it as one of the worst songs of 2025, with writer Lydia Wei criticizing the mismatched melody, the lyrics, and the perceived overuse of the song online. Lauren Boisvert of Vice listed it among "popular songs that went viral for the wrong reasons", opining that the lyrics "lacked [Doechii's] usual cleverness" and "didn't quite hold up" in comparison to her current work. Joe Wicke of The Diamondback, while claiming that Anxiety "isn't a bad song" and is "far from the worst sample ever", criticized its lack of innovativeness, calling it "disappointing" compared to Doechii's other music and using it as an example, among other songs, of subpar sample usage.

== Commercial performance ==
"Anxiety" debuted at number 13 on the Billboard Hot 100. During its second week on the chart, "Anxiety" climbed to number 10, becoming her first top ten song and her highest-charting song to date. In the United Kingdom, "Anxiety" debuted at number four on the UK Singles Chart on March 14, 2025 – for the week ending date March 20, 2025 – becoming Doechii's highest-debuting song and first top ten song in Britain. The following week, "Anxiety" climbed one position to its peak of number three on the UK Singles Chart. Sleepy Hallow's version of "Anxiety" debuted at number 15 on the UK Singles Chart, later peaking at number 15.

In late March 2025, "Anxiety" topped the charts in Australia, Switzerland, New Zealand, and Latvia. In France, the song debuted at number 17, becoming Doechii's first entry there and the highest entry for a female rapper since "Fefe" by Nicki Minaj and 6ix9ine, whicb debuted at number 16 in 2018. The next week, the song entered in the top ten, at number 7, becoming Doechii's first top ten and the first rap song to do so since Doja Cat's "Paint the Town Red" (2023). The song is certified platinum for 200,000 units gold, becoming the rapper's first gold certification.

== Music video ==
On April 18, 2025, a music video for the song directed by James Mackel was released. The video makes a reference to the music video for "Somebody That I Used to Know".

== Usage in media ==
The song was used extensively in marketing material for the film Final Destination Bloodlines.

== Accolades ==
Awards and nominations
Organisation	Year	Category	Result	Ref.
MTV Video Music Awards	2025	Song of the Year	Nominated	
MTV Video Music Awards	2025	Best Hip Hop	Won	
MTV Video Music Awards	2025	Video for Good	Nominated	
MTV Video Music Awards	2025	Best Choreography	Won	
NRJ Music Awards	2025	Social Hit	Nominated	
Grammy Awards	2026	Record of the Year	Nominated	
Grammy Awards	2026	Song of the Year	Nominated	
Grammy Awards	2026	Best Rap Performance	Nominated	
Grammy Awards	2026	Best Rap Song	Nominated	
Grammy Awards	2026	Best Music Video	Won	
iHeartRadio Music Awards	2026	Song of the Year	Nominated	
iHeartRadio Music Awards	2026	Best Lyrics	Nominated	
NAACP Image Awards	2026	Outstanding Hip Hop/Rap Song	Nominated	
NAACP Image Awards	2026	Outstanding Music Video/Visual Album	Nominated	
Music Awards Japan	2026	Best International Hip Hop/Rap Song in Japan	Nominated	
BET Awards	2026	Video of the Year	Nominated	

== Charts ==
=== Weekly charts ===
Weekly chart performance
Chart (2025)	Peak position
Argentina Anglo Airplay (Monitor Latino)	9
Australia (ARIA)	1
Austria (Ö3 Austria Top 40)	3
Belarus Airplay (TopHit)	19
Belgium (Ultratop 50 Flanders)	5
Belgium (Ultratop 50 Wallonia)	5
Bolivia Anglo Airplay (Monitor Latino)	3
Brazil Hot 100 (Billboard)	50
Bulgaria Airplay (PROPHON)	1
Canada Hot 100 (Billboard)	13
Canada CHR/Top 40 (Billboard)	2
Canada Hot AC (Billboard)	8
Central America Anglo Airplay (Monitor Latino)	5
Chile Anglo Airplay (Monitor Latino)	5
Colombia Anglo Airplay (National-Report)	1
CIS Airplay (TopHit)	3
Costa Rica Anglo Airplay (Monitor Latino)	5
Croatia International Airplay (Top lista)	2
Czech Republic Airplay (ČNS IFPI)	4
Czech Republic Singles Digital (ČNS IFPI)	5
Denmark (Tracklisten)	9
Dominican Republic Anglo Airplay (Monitor Latino)	2
Ecuador Anglo Airplay (Monitor Latino)	3
El Salvador Anglo Airplay (Monitor Latino)	1
Estonia Airplay (TopHit)	1
France (SNEP)	6
France Airplay (SNEP)	1
Germany (GfK)	4
Global 200 (Billboard)	3
Greece International (IFPI)	1
Guatemala Anglo Airplay (Monitor Latino)	2
Honduras Anglo Airplay (Monitor Latino)	2
Hungary (Rádiós Top 40)	3
Hungary (Single Top 40)	9
Iceland (Tónlistinn)	21
Ireland (IRMA)	4
Israel (Mako Hitlist)	1
Italy (FIMI)	16
Jamaica Airplay (JAMMS)	8
Japan Hot Overseas (Billboard Japan)	9
Kazakhstan Airplay (TopHit)	12
Latin America Anglo Airplay (Monitor Latino)	1
Latvia Airplay (LaIPA)	1
Latvia Streaming (LaIPA)	1
Lebanon (Lebanese Top 20)	4
Lithuania (AGATA)	4
Lithuania Airplay (TopHit)	3
Luxembourg (Billboard)	2
Malaysia International (RIM)	14
Mexico Anglo Airplay (Monitor Latino)	1
Moldova Airplay (TopHit)	100
Netherlands (Dutch Top 40)	19
Netherlands (Single Top 100)	10
New Zealand (Recorded Music NZ)	1
Nicaragua Anglo Airplay (Monitor Latino)	2
Nigeria (TurnTable Top 100)	53
North Macedonia Airplay (Radiomonitor)	1
Norway (VG-lista)	5
Panama Anglo Airplay (Monitor Latino)	5
Paraguay Anglo Airplay (Monitor Latino)	5
Peru Anglo Airplay (Monitor Latino)	1
Philippines Hot 100 (Billboard Philippines)	26
Poland Airplay (OLiS)	7
Poland Streaming (OLiS)	4
Portugal (AFP)	21
Puerto Rico Airplay (Monitor Latino)	3
Romania (Billboard)	25
Romania Airplay (UPFR)	4
Romania Airplay (Media Forest)	11
Romania TV Airplay (Media Forest)	15
Russia Airplay (TopHit)	7
San Marino Airplay (SMRTV Top 50)	1
Serbia Airplay (Radiomonitor)	1
Singapore (RIAS)	30
Slovakia Airplay (ČNS IFPI)	2
Slovakia Singles Digital (ČNS IFPI)	4
Slovenia Airplay (Radiomonitor)	9
South Africa (Billboard)	21
South Korea (Circle)	175
Spain (Promusicae)	23
Suriname (Nationale Top 40)	7
Sweden (Sverigetopplistan)	12
Switzerland (Schweizer Hitparade)	1
Turkey International Airplay (Radiomonitor Türkiye)	6
Ukraine Airplay (TopHit)	107
UK Singles (Official Charts)	3
Uruguay Anglo Airplay (Monitor Latino)	7
US Billboard Hot 100	9
US Adult Contemporary (Billboard)	23
US Adult Pop Airplay (Billboard)	4
US Hot R&B/Hip-Hop Songs (Billboard)	3
US Pop Airplay (Billboard)	1
US Rhythmic Airplay (Billboard)	1
Venezuela Airplay (Record Report)	42

=== Monthly charts ===
Monthly chart performance
Chart (2025)	Position
Belarus Airplay (TopHit)	26
CIS Airplay (TopHit)	4
Estonia Airplay (TopHit)	3
Kazakhstan Airplay (TopHit)	19
Latvia Airplay (TopHit)	2
Lithuania Airplay (TopHit)	4
Romania Airplay (TopHit)	5
Russia Airplay (TopHit)	17

=== Year-end charts ===
Year-end chart performance
Chart (2025)	Position
Argentina Anglo Airplay (Monitor Latino)	34
Australia (ARIA)	64
Austria (Ö3 Austria Top 40)	34
Belarus Airplay (TopHit)	63
Belgium (Ultratop 50 Flanders)	60
Belgium (Ultratop 50 Wallonia)	11
Bulgaria Airplay (PROPHON)	4
Canada (Canadian Hot 100)	44
Canada CHR/Top 40 (Billboard)	26
Canada Hot AC (Billboard)	36
CIS Airplay (TopHit)	29
Estonia Airplay (TopHit)	76
France (SNEP)	45
Germany (GfK)	38
Global 200 (Billboard)	89
Hungary (Rádiós Top 40)	100
Hungary (Single Top 40)	98
Kazakhstan Airplay (TopHit)	107
Latvia Airplay (TopHit)	30
Lithuania Airplay (TopHit)	11
Netherlands (Dutch Top 40)	96
Romania Airplay (TopHit)	37
Russia Airplay (TopHit)	118
Switzerland (Schweizer Hitparade)	39
UK Singles (OCC)	70
US Billboard Hot 100	39
US Adult Pop Airplay (Billboard)	21
US Hot R&B/Hip-Hop Songs (Billboard)	13
US Pop Airplay (Billboard)	12
US Rhythmic Airplay (Billboard)	10

== Certifications ==
Certifications
Region	Certification	Certified units/sales
Australia (ARIA)	Platinum	70,000^{‡}
Belgium (BRMA)	Platinum	40,000^{‡}
Brazil (Pro-Música Brasil)	Diamond	160,000^{‡}
Canada (Music Canada)	2× Platinum	160,000^{‡}
Denmark (IFPI Danmark)	Gold	45,000^{‡}
France (SNEP)	Diamond	333,333^{‡}
Germany (BVMI)	Gold	300,000^{‡}
Italy (FIMI)	Gold	100,000^{‡}
New Zealand (RMNZ)	Platinum	30,000^{‡}
Poland (ZPAV)	Platinum	125,000^{‡}
Portugal (AFP)	Platinum	10,000^{‡}
Spain (Promusicae)	Gold	50,000^{‡}
Switzerland (IFPI Switzerland)	Gold	15,000^{‡}
United Kingdom (BPI)	Platinum	600,000^{‡}
United States (RIAA)	Platinum	1,000,000^{‡}
Streaming
Greece (IFPI Greece)	Gold	1,000,000^{†}
^{‡} Sales+streaming figures based on certification alone.^{†} Streaming-only figures based on certification alone.

== Release history ==
Release dates and formats
Region	Date	Format	Label	Ref.
Various	March 4, 2025	Digital download; streaming	Top Dawg; Capitol	
Germany	April 18, 2025	CD	Capitol	
United Kingdom	April 18, 2025	Cassette; CD	Polydor	
United Kingdom	July 18, 2025	7"	Polydor	
Various	July 18, 2025	7"	Capitol	
