= Die Young (disambiguation) =

"Die Young" is a 2012 single by Kesha.

Die Young may also refer to:

- Die Young (album), a 2005 album by Wisdom in Chains
- "Die Young" (Roddy Ricch song), 2018
- "Die Young" (Sheppard song), 2019
- "Die Young" (Sleepy Hallow song), 2022
- "Die Young", a song by Black Sabbath from the 1980 album Heaven and Hell
- "Die Young", a 2017 single by Sylvan Esso, released on their 2017 album What Now
- "Die Young", a 2018 song by Chappell Roan, released on the 2023 album Super Graphic Ultra Modern Girl

== See also ==
- "If I Die Young", a song released in 2010 by The Band Perry
