= Mala (6ix9ine song) =

2018 song by 6ix9ine featuring Anuel AA

Song by 6ix9ine featuring Anuel AA

from the album Dummy Boy
- Recorded: 2018
- Genre: Reggaeton
- Length: 3:27
- Label: ScumGang; Create Music
- Songwriters: Daniel Hernandez; Emmanuel Gazmey Santiago; Daniel Echavarría Oviedo
- Producer: Ovy on the Drums

"Mala" (stylized in all caps) is a song by American rapper 6ix9ine from his debut studio album, Dummy Boy (2018). It features Latin trap and reggaeton artist Anuel AA. This marks the second collaboration between the artists following the success of "Bebe".

== Composition ==
The song describes a bad woman who resembles a demon as she acts with evil intentions. 6ix9ine and Anuel AA wrote it alongside Colombian producer Ovy on the Drums, who produced it.

== Commercial performance ==
"Mala" did not enter the Billboard Hot 100, but peaked at number 20 on the Bubbling Under Hot 100 chart and at number 7 on the US Billboard Hot Latin Songs chart dated December 15, 2018. In Spain's official weekly chart, it debuted at number four on the PROMUSICAE chart dated November 30, 2018 before reaching the second position in its fourth week on the chart. The song also peaked at number eight the Latin Digital Song Sales chart and the Latin Streaming Songs chart. "Mala" also appeared on the charts in Argentina (59), Italy (21), Switzerland (80), France (132) and Romania (3).

== Charts ==
Chart performance for "Mala"
Chart (2018)	Peak position
Argentina Hot 100 (Billboard)	59
France (SNEP)	132
Italy (FIMI)	21
Romania (Billboard)	3
Spain (PROMUSICAE)	2
Switzerland (Schweizer Hitparade)	80
US Bubbling Under Hot 100 (Billboard)	20
US Hot Latin Songs (Billboard)	7
US Latin Digital Song Sales (Billboard)	8

== Certifications ==
Certifications and sales for "Mala"
Region	Certification	Certified units/sales
Italy (FIMI)	Platinum	50,000^{‡}
Spain (Promusicae)	3× Platinum	180,000^{‡}
^{‡} Sales+streaming figures based on certification alone.
