= Mama (6ix9ine song) =

Song by 6ix9ine featuring Kanye West and Nicki Minaj

from the album Dummy Boy
- Recorded: November 27, 2018
- Length: 3:12
- Label: ScumGang; Create Music
- Songwriters: Daniel Hernandez; Andrew Green; Dexter Mills; Kanye West; Onika Maraj; Shane Lindstrom; Rasool Diaz
- Producers: Murda Beatz; Sool Got Hits

"Mama" (stylized in all caps) is a song by the American rapper 6ix9ine featuring Nicki Minaj and Kanye West from 6ix9ine's debut album, Dummy Boy (2018).

== Music video ==
The three artists were supposed to film a music video for the track in Beverly Hills, but it was never finished due to a shooting on set, though none of them were injured. Surveillance footage showed gunmen firing on the set. On November 16, 2018, 6ix9ine claimed while visiting The Breakfast Club that the video had "already been shot", but two days later he was set to show up to shoot additional footage for the video but was arrested instead on racketeering charges. Since no word have come out of the video since the arrest it has been indicated that it has been scrapped.

== Commercial performance ==
"Mama" debuted at number 68 on the UK Singles Chart upon the release of Dummy Boy. Within the same week, it reached number 43 on the US Billboard Hot 100 and number 51 on the Canadian Hot 100 and rose to its peak of number 16 in Canada the next week. "Mama" performed best in Slovakia, charting at number 11 on the Singles Digitál Top 100.

== Charts ==
| Chart (2018) | Peak position |
|---|---|
| Australia (ARIA) | 22 |
| Austria (Ö3 Austria Top 40) | 40 |
| Canada Hot 100 (Billboard) | 16 |
| Czech Republic Singles Digital (ČNS IFPI) | 75 |
| France (SNEP) | 72 |
| Hungary (Single Top 40) | 40 |
| Hungary (Stream Top 40) | 38 |
| Ireland (IRMA) | 29 |
| Italy (FIMI) | 82 |
| Latvia (LAIPA) | 16 |
| Netherlands (Single Top 100) | 63 |
| New Zealand (Recorded Music NZ) | 29 |
| Slovakia Singles Digital (ČNS IFPI) | 11 |
| Sweden (Sverigetopplistan) | 57 |
| Switzerland (Schweizer Hitparade) | 23 |
| UK Singles (Official Charts) | 29 |
| UK Hip Hop/R&B (Official Charts) | 8 |
| US Billboard Hot 100 | 43 |
| US Hot R&B/Hip-Hop Songs (Billboard) | 18 |

== Certifications ==
| Region | Certification | Certified units/sales |
|---|---|---|
| United States (RIAA) | Gold | 500,000^{‡} |
^{‡} Sales+streaming figures based on certification alone.
