= Fousheé =

American singer-songwriter

- Born: Britanny Fousheé; Bridgewater, New Jersey, U.S.
- Genres: R&B; soul
- Occupation: Singer-songwriter
- Instruments: Vocals; guitar
- Years active: 2019–present
- Labels: RCA; Trackmasters
- Website: fousheeofficial.com

Britanny Fousheé (born 1998) is an American singer-songwriter. She came to wide notice when the vocals for her song "Deep End" were used on a hit song by rapper Sleepy Hallow in 2020. She released her RCA Records second extended play Time Machine on June 4, 2021, and has collaborated with multiple artists including Vince Staples, Lil Wayne, James Blake, Steve Lacy, Lil Yachty and Lil Uzi Vert. She released her debut album, Softcore, on November 17, 2022.

== Background and early life ==
Fousheé was born and raised in New Jersey. Her Jamaican mother was a drummer for PEP, an all-woman 1980s Jamaican reggae band. Fousheé wrote her first song when she was five. In her younger years she studied voice, media, classical music, background arranging, guitar, and piano and performed with groups she had formed with her childhood friends. She attended Bridgewater-Raritan High School and continued her musical activities into college.

== Career ==
Fousheé released her debut EP Speak Up in May 2018. In fall 2018 she competed on season 15 of The Voice making it up to the battle rounds with Adam Levine as her coach. In 2019 she moved to Los Angeles.

=== 2020: "Deep End" ===
Fousheé was invited to contribute vocal samples to Splice, a royalty-free music database. American rapper Sleepy Hallow found her "Deep End" track and used it in his 2020 single "Deep End Freestyle". His track ended up going viral on TikTok and had an associated dance challenge which drove up its popularity; Fousheé hadn't known about the trend and wasn't credited on the song for some time. The Sleepy Hallow track, "Deep End Freestyle", was certified platinum by the RIAA in August 2020.

In the same year, Fousheé released her own version of the song, simply titled "Deep End". The song reached the No. 10 spot on Billboard's March 27 Alternative Airplay chart. With that feat, she became the first Black woman to hit the Top 10 for that chart since Tracy Chapman with her song "Crossroads" in 1989.

=== 2020–present: Solo career and collaborations ===
Fousheé signed to RCA Records in June 2020. She also had the video for her track "By One" premiered by Essence in October of the same year.

She was named Billboard's R&B/hip-hop rookie for the month of March 2021. Her RCA debut EP, Time Machine, was released on June 4, 2021, under Trackmasters Entertainment. She was also named Apple's "Up Next Artist" for that same month and was the cover feature of Wonderland Magazine's Summer 2021 issue.

In 2021, Fousheé collaborated with French rappers Laylow and Nekfeu on the song "Spécial" on Laylow's album "L'étrange histoire de Mr. Anderson".

It was around the same time that she started collaborating with mainstream artists including Lil Wayne and Vince Staples. In August, she performed the song "Take Me Home" on The Tonight Show Starring Jimmy Fallon with the latter. In the fall, she toured with James Blake at venues including the Chicago Theatre and Radio City Music Hall. The track "Clap for Him" from Time Machine also featured Lil Yachty; he appeared in the track's music video as well.

In 2022, she collaborated with Steve Lacy and not only co-wrote but contributed background vocals for the songs "Sunshine" and "Bad Habit," both of which were lead singles for his second studio album Gemini Rights. "Bad Habit" made it to the number one spot on the Billboard Hot 100, becoming both of the artists' first number one entry on the chart. She also appeared on Ravyn Lenae's debut album Hypnos the same year. In the leadup to her debut album, she appeared in a feature article by Flaunt in which she was pictured in Prada, Loewe, Louis Vuitton, and Dolce & Gabbana. Her debut album Softcore was released on November 17, 2022.

In January 2023, Fousheé was featured on Lil Yachty's Let's Start Here tracks, "Pretty" and "The Alchemist".

On September 8, 2023, American rapper and singer Teezo Touchdown, released his debut album How Do You Sleep at Night? with a featuring from Fousheé on the track, "Sweet".

== Discography ==
=== Studio albums ===
List of albums with selected details
Title	Album details
Softcore	Released: November 18, 2022; Label: Trackmasters, RCA; Format: CD, LP, digital download, streaming
Pointy Heights	Released: September 13, 2024; Label: Trackmasters, RCA; Format: CD, LP, digital download, streaming

=== Extended plays ===
List of EPs with selected details
Title	Album details
Relative Motion	Released: May 1, 2020; Label: Self-released; Format: Digital download, streaming
Time Machine	Released: June 4, 2021; Label: Trackmasters, RCA; Format: Digital download, streaming

=== Singles ===
==== As lead artist ====
Title	Year	Peak chart positions						Certifications	Album
Title	Year	US	CAN	GER	IRE	SWI	UK	Certifications	Album
"Melody"	2016	—	—	—	—	—	—		Non-album singles
"Stay Home"	2019	—	—	—	—	—	—		Non-album singles
"Oxygen"	2019	—	—	—	—	—	—		Non-album singles
"Late Night"	2019	—	—	—	—	—	—		Non-album singles
"Expectations"	2020	—	—	—	—	—	—		Non-album singles
"Deep End Freestyle" (with Sleepy Hallow)	2020	80	69	—	66	—	93	RIAA: Platinum	Sleepy Hallow Presents: Sleepy for President
"Deep End"	2020	—	—	75	60	52	—	RIAA: Gold; MC: Gold	Time Machine
"Single AF"	2020	—	—	—	—	—	—		Non-album singles
"Sing About Love"	2021	—	—	—	—	—	—		Non-album singles
"Gold Fronts" (featuring Lil Wayne)	2021	—	—	—	—	—	—		Non-album singles
"Enjoy the Silence"	2021	—	—	—	—	—	—		Time Machine
"My Slime"	2021	—	—	—	—	—	—		Time Machine
"Little Bother" (with King Princess)	2022	—	—	—	—	—	—		Hold On Baby
"Double Standard"	2022	—	—	—	—	—	—		Non-album single
"I'm Fine"	2022	—	—	—	—	—	—		Softcore
"Supernova"	2022	—	—	—	—	—	—		Softcore
"Spend the Money" (featuring Lil Uzi Vert)	2022	—	—	—	—	—	—		Softcore
"Still Around"	2024	—	—	—	—	—	—		Pointy Heights
"War"	2024	—	—	—	—	—	—		Pointy Heights
"100 Bux"	2024	—	—	—	—	—	—		Pointy Heights
"Feel Like Home"	2024	—	—	—	—	—	—		Pointy Heights
"—" denotes a recording that did not chart or was not released in that territory.

==== As featured artist ====
Title	Year	Peak chart positions		Album
Title	Year	US Bub.	NZ Hot	Album
"Sunshine" (Steve Lacy featuring Fousheé)	2022	7	12	Gemini Rights
"Square Up" (Dahi featuring Fousheé)	2026			Black Boy (Alternative)

=== Other charted songs ===
Title	Year	Peak chart positions			Album
Title	Year	FRA	NZ Hot	SWI	Album
"Take Me Home" (with Vince Staples)	2021	—	28	—	Vince Staples
"Special" (Laylow featuring Nekfeu and Fousheé)	2021	7	—	91	L'étrange histoire de Mr. Anderson
"Pretty" (Lil Yachty featuring Fousheé)	2023	—	20	—	Let's Start Here
"The Alchemist" (Lil Yachty featuring Fousheé)	2023	—	—	—	Let's Start Here
"Sweet" (Teezo Touchdown featuring Fousheé)	2023	—	—	—	How Do You Sleep at Night?
