= Time Machine (EP) =

2021 EP by Fousheé

EP by Fousheé
- Released: June 4, 2021
- Genre: R&B; hip hop; alternative pop
- Length: 29:55
- Label: Trackmasters; RCA

Fousheé chronology
Relative Motion (2020)	Time Machine (2021)	Softcore (2022)

Singles from Time Machine
- 1. "Deep End" Released: July 31, 2020; 2. "Enjoy the Silence" Released: May 20, 2021; 3. "My Slime" Released: June 1, 2021

Time Machine (stylized in all lowercase) is the second extended play (EP) by American musician Fousheé. It was released on June 4, 2021, through Trackmasters Entertainment and RCA Records. From the EP, are released the singles: "Deep End", "Enjoy the Silence" and "My Slime".

== Background ==
After having gained notoriety with her hit single, "Deep End", in July 2020, Fousheé would sign a record deal with RCA Records in October of the same year and the following month, she released her single under the label titled "Single AF". The accompanying music video for the song contains a guest appearance from American rapper and singer, Teezo Touchdown. On March 7, 2021, Fousheé released her single "Sing About Love". On March 11 of the same year, she was named "R&B/Hip hop Rookie of the Month" by Billboard and the 29 of the same month, the singer released her collaboration with Lil Wayne, "Gold Fronts", along with the music video. On May 20, 2021, Fousheé released her cover of Depeche Mode's "Enjoy the Silence". On June 1, 2021, Fousheé released her single "My Slime" and the next day, she announced her music video and the name of her project through her Twitter account. On June 3, Fousheé revealed the project's cover art and tracklist via Twitter as well.

Time Machine was officially released on June 4, 2021, along with the music video for her previous single, "My Slime". However, her previous singles "Single AF", "Sing About Love" and "Gold Fronts", were not included in the project.

== Composition ==
Time Machine is a nine-track R&B, hip hop, and alternative pop record. Lil Yachty and Steve Lacy appears as guest vocalists.

== Release and promotion ==
Time Machine was officially released on June 4, 2021, via Trackmasters Entertainment and RCA Records.

=== Singles ===
The first single, "Deep End", was released on July 31, 2020, along with the accompanying music video. The Depeche Mode's cover for "Enjoy the Silence", was released on May 20, 2021, as the second single from the project, along with its audio visualizer in which she is seen in different locations in sunrise, sunset, and at night. The third and last single, "My Slime", was released on June 1, 2021. it's self-directed music video for the song was released along with the whole Time Machine project and features Fousheé and it's love interest robbing a bank. HopNewHipHop describes the track as a "slow-groove alt-R&B song pays ode to a lover she's obsessed with". On June 15, 2021, she performed the song at the Jimmy Kimmel Live!.

On July 16, 2021, Fousheé released a Zhamak Fullad directed music video for the Lil Yachty assisted track, "Clap for Him". The song mark the first collaboration between both artists after in January 2023, Fousheé would be featuring on Yachty's tracks, "Pretty" and "The Alchemist", from his fifth studio album, Let's Start Here.

== Critical reception ==
Professional ratings
Review scores
Source	Rating
Pitchfork	6.7/10

Time Machine received critical acclaim with Pitchfork raving, "the singer-songwriter arrives on her own terms with a debut that flits effortlessly between guitar-based soul, alt-pop, and R&B. That deft balance between Fousheé's whispery, enticing flow and her aching falsetto is time machine's greatest asset. While UPROXX stated that the project is "a great way to experience Foushee's artistry and all she has to offer through it".

== Track listing ==
Time Machine track listing
No.	Title	Length
1.	"Time Machine"	2:10
2.	"Deep End"	2:21
3.	"My Slime"	3:08
4.	"Enjoy the Silence"	2:27
5.	"I Don't Love You No More"	3:46
6.	"Clap for Him" (featuring Lil Yachty)	3:03
7.	"Paper Plane"	2:23
8.	"2 L8"	3:07
9.	"Candy Grapes" (featuring Steve Lacy)	7:30
Total length:		29:55

Apple Music Edition
No.	Title	Length
10.	"Up Next: Fousheé (Exclusive)"	7:41
Total length:		37:36

Notes

- All tracks are stylized in all lowercase.
