= Dummy Boy =

Studio album by 6ix9ine
- Released: November 27, 2018
- Recorded: 2018
- Genre: Hip-hop
- Length: 34:30
- Labels: Scumgang; 10K; Create
- Producers: Avedon; Boi-1da; Cubeatz; DJ Spinking; Michael Mora; Murda Beatz; Ovy on the Drums; SkoobTheKid; Ronny J; Scott Storch; Sool Got Hits; Take a Daytrip; Tay Keith; Yung Lan

6ix9ine chronology
Day69 (2018)	Dummy Boy (2018)	TattleTales (2020)

Singles from Dummy Boy
- 1. "Tati" Released: May 27, 2018; 2. "Fefe" Released: July 22, 2018; 3. "Bebe" Released: August 31, 2018; 4. "Stoopid" Released: October 5, 2018

Dummy Boy (stylized in all caps) is the debut studio album by American rapper 6ix9ine. It was released on November 27, 2018, but was originally scheduled to be released four days earlier. It follows his EP, Day69, released earlier in 2018. Dummy Boy features guest appearances from Nicki Minaj, Kanye West, Lil Baby, Gunna, Tory Lanez, A Boogie wit da Hoodie, Anuel AA, TrifeDrew, and Bobby Shmurda, among others.

Dummy Boy was supported by the singles "Tati" featuring DJ Spinking, "Fefe" with Nicki Minaj and Murda Beatz, "Bebe" featuring Anuel AA and "Stoopid" featuring Bobby Shmurda. The album was leaked on 6ix9ine's website on November 24, 2018, and released three days later as a result of the early leaking and at the request of 6ix9ine himself. Despite receiving negative reviews from critics, the album debuted at number two on the US Billboard 200, with 66,000 album-equivalent units earned in three days, and has been certified platinum by the Recording Industry Association of America (RIAA).

== Background ==
According to 6ix9ine, the album came about when he decided to "put out a project November 23rd" after being in the studio "making hits".

== Promotion ==
6ix9ine revealed the cover art on November 7, which XXL characterized as 6ix9ine's animated likeness urinating a rainbow. 6ix9ine also previewed a new unnamed track, which HotNewHipHop called "a Jackie Chan-inspired banger" made in collaboration with Scott Storch and Tory Lanez; the song was later revealed to be called "Kika". Several days later, 6ix9ine revealed on Instagram that Nicki Minaj, Lil Baby, Tory Lanez, A Boogie wit da Hoodie, Gunna, Anuel AA and Bobby Shmurda would feature on the album. He later deleted the post, then posted a similar photo revealing Kanye West would be featured on the album.

During the recording of a music video for "Mama" on November 8, 2018, two gunmen shot upon a mansion with West and 6ix9ine present. A bullet went through the dressing room of Nicki Minaj, but she was not present at the scene. The music video has since been scrapped.

== Release ==
On November 7, 2018, 6ix9ine announced that the Dummy Boy album would be released on November 23, 2018. The album was originally set to be released on November 23, but two days before that date it was announced on 6ix9ine's Instagram that it would be postponed until further notice following his arrest and trial. On November 27, 2018, DJ Akademiks revealed via Twitter that the album would be released on the same day as a result of the early leaking and at the request of 6ix9ine himself. The album was originally supposed to be distributed through Capitol Music Group and Caroline Distribution, but due to an argument stemming from the album's leak, the album was distributed through Create Music Group.

== Critical reception ==
Professional ratings
Aggregate scores
Source	Rating
Metacritic	38/100
Review scores
Source	Rating
The 405	2/10
AllMusic	2/5 stars
Consequence of Sound	C−
Financial Times	1/5 stars
The Independent	1/5 stars
NME	1/5 stars
Pitchfork	3.4/10
PopMatters	4/10
Rolling Stone	2/5 stars
The Times	1/5 stars

Dummy Boy received generally negative reviews from music critics, who panned its lyrics, production and Hernandez's performance. At Metacritic, which assigns a normalized rating out of 100 to reviews from mainstream publications, the album received an average score of 38, based on 11 reviews, indicating "generally unfavorable reviews".

Jon Caramanica of The New York Times called the album "energetic but scattered", and less "rowdy" than Day69 due to having softer vocal delivery. He noted that tracks such as "Waka" and "Feefa" seemed to be dominated by the guest artists. Writing for Forbes, Bryan Rolli said that "6ix9ine repeatedly gets shut out by his collaborators and sounds like a visitor on his own album. The young rapper tries to split the difference between his abrasive, streetwise roots and big-budget arena rap spectacle, subsequently failing at both."

Dhruva Balram of NME concluded in his review that "Tekashi has released Dummy Boy at the apex of his fame, but at this stage, he's little more than an internet phenomenon and controversy magnet who also raps. Due to his recent arrest, there's a very real possibility that he will spend the rest of his life in jail. That, hopefully, will give him enough time to release a better project." In a more mixed review, M. Oliver of PopMatters remarked that "What Dummy Boy lacks in maturity and creativity it makes up for in energy and vitriol – equivalently bankable features in 2018."

== Commercial performance ==
Dummy Boy debuted at number two on the US Billboard 200 with 66,000 album-equivalent units (of which 10,000 were pure album sales), opening behind Travis Scott's Astroworld on three days of sales, having been released on November 27. It is 6ix9ine's highest-charting album on the chart. On September 4, 2019, the album was certified platinum by the Recording Industry Association of America (RIAA) for combined sales and album-equivalent units of over a million units in the United States.

== Track listing ==
Dummy Boy track listing
No.	Title	Writer(s)	Producer(s)	Length
1.	"Stoopid" (featuring Bobby Shmurda)	Daniel Hernandez; Andrew Green; Ackquille Pollard; Brytavious Chambers	Tay Keith; DJNekoLito	2:32
2.	"Fefe" (featuring Nicki Minaj and Murda Beatz)	Hernandez; Green; Onika Maraj; Shane Lindstrom; Kevin Gomringer; Tim Gomringer	Murda Beatz; Cubeatz (Note: Credited as co-producer.)	2:59
3.	"Tic Toc" (featuring Lil Baby)	Hernandez; Green; Dominique Jones; Andres Espana; Milan Modi	Yung Lan; Felipe S	2:16
4.	"Kika" (featuring Tory Lanez)	Hernandez; Green; Daystar Peterson; Vincent van den Ende; Scott Storch	Scott Storch; Avedon	2:16
5.	"Mama" (featuring Nicki Minaj and Kanye West)	Hernandez; Green; Maraj; Kanye West; Lindstrom; Dexter Mills; Rasool Diaz	Sool Got Hits; Murda Beatz	3:12
6.	"Waka" (featuring A Boogie wit da Hoodie)	Hernandez; Green; Artist Dubose; Ende; Storch	Scott Storch; J Gramm; Avedon	2:09
7.	"Bebe" (featuring Anuel AA)	Hernandez; Emmanuel Gazmey; Ronald Spence Jr.	Ronny J	3:38
8.	"Mala" (featuring Anuel AA)	Hernandez; Gazmey; Daniel Echavarría	Ovy on the Drums	3:27
9.	"Kanga" (featuring Kanye West)	Hernandez; Green; West; Lindstrom; Mills; Ant Clemons	Murda Beatz	2:12
10.	"Feefa" (featuring Gunna)	Hernandez; Green; Sergio Kitchens; Michael Mora	Michael Mora	2:43
11.	"Tati" (featuring DJ SpinKing)	Hernandez; Green; Gomringer; Gomringer; Gibran Jairam; Matthew Samuels	Boi-1da; Cubeatz; DJ SpinKing	2:35
12.	"Wondo"	Hernandez; Green; Ende; Storch	Scott Storch; Avedon	2:01
13.	"Dummy" (featuring TrifeDrew)	Hernandez; Green; Denzel Baptiste; David Biral	Take a Daytrip	2:36
Total length:				34:30

Notes

- All tracks are stylized in all caps.
- Due to a mispress, the vinyl edition omits the track "Fefe" and instead includes "Feefa" in its place. "Feefa" also appears in its correct position, resulting in the track being duplicated on the release.

== Personnel ==
- 6ix9ine – vocals (all tracks)
- Andres Espana – guitar (track 3)
- Lee "Wizard Lee" Weinberg – mixing (tracks 1–4, 6–10, 12, 13); mastering (tracks 1–4, 6–13); recording (tracks 3, 4, 6, 8–10, 12, 13)
- Todd Robinson – mixing, recording (tracks 4, 6, 12)
- Take a Daytrip – mixing, recording (track 13)

== Charts ==
=== Weekly charts ===
Weekly chart performance for Dummy Boy
Chart (2018)	Peak position
Austrian Albums (Ö3 Austria)	35
Belgian Albums (Ultratop Flanders)	12
Belgian Albums (Ultratop Wallonia)	52
Canadian Albums (Billboard)	2
Czech Albums (ČNS IFPI)	15
Danish Albums (Hitlisten)	4
Dutch Albums (Album Top 100)	3
Finnish Albums (Suomen virallinen lista)	1
French Albums (SNEP)	38
Irish Albums (IRMA)	12
Italian Albums (FIMI)	38
Latvian Albums (LAIPA)	1
Lithuanian Albums (AGATA)	2
New Zealand Albums (RMNZ)	8
Norwegian Albums (VG-lista)	3
Slovak Albums (ČNS IFPI)	8
Spanish Albums (Promusicae)	5
Swedish Albums (Sverigetopplistan)	2
Swiss Albums (Schweizer Hitparade)	30
UK Albums (Official Charts)	30
US Billboard 200	2
US Independent Albums (Billboard)	2
US Top R&B/Hip-Hop Albums (Billboard)	2

=== Year-end charts ===
Year-end chart performance for Dummy Boy
Chart (2019)	Position
Belgian Albums (Ultratop Flanders)	95
Belgian Albums (Ultratop Wallonia)	181
Canadian Albums (Billboard)	37
Danish Albums (Hitlisten)	91
Dutch Albums (Album Top 100)	80
French Albums (SNEP)	200
Swedish Albums (Sverigetopplistan)	66
US Billboard 200	79
US Top R&B/Hip-Hop Albums (Billboard)	42

== Certifications ==
Certifications for Dummy Boy
Region	Certification	Certified units/sales
Denmark (IFPI Danmark)	Gold	10,000^{‡}
France (SNEP)	Gold	50,000^{‡}
Italy (FIMI)	Platinum	50,000^{‡}
United Kingdom (BPI)	Gold	100,000^{‡}
United States (RIAA)	Platinum	1,000,000^{‡}
^{‡} Sales+streaming figures based on certification alone.
