= 2055 (song) =

2021 single by Sleepy Hallow

Single by Sleepy Hallow

from the album Still Sleep?
- Released: April 14, 2021
- Length: 2:03
- Label: Winners Circle; RCA
- Songwriter: Tegan Chambers
- Producers: Great John; UV Killin Em

Sleepy Hallow singles chronology
"Strapped" (2021)	"2055" (2021)	"Run It Up" (2021)

Music video
- "2055" on YouTube

Remix cover
- Cover art of the official remix featuring Coi Leray.

"2055" is a song by American rapper Sleepy Hallow, released on April 14, 2021 as the second single from his debut studio album Still Sleep? (2021). Produced by Great John and UV Killin Em, it is his second highest-charting song, peaking at number 51 on the Billboard Hot 100. The official remix of the song was released on July 28, 2021, and features American rapper Coi Leray.

== Composition ==
In the song, Sleepy Hallow uses a melodic delivery over a beat of guitar and drums with a melancholy tone and lyrics about his loneliness and mistrust: "I just wanna slide, huh / Parties in the sky like it's 2055, huh / She said 'Boy you nice, boy you nice', huh / Heart cold like some water and some ice (Huh)". He sings about mistrust and struggles in his street life as well ("Real niggas cry blood (Blood) / Hope my kid never try drugs (Huh) / All I wanted was some love, would that trade for a gun (Huh) / Big pack on me now, remember back then I was fucked up, huh / I don't really want friends, everybody fake, I don't got trust").

== Music video ==
A music video was released alongside the single. The animated visual was directed by Ryan Dylan Selkirk (Aylo) and animation was designed by Owen Khang, Akam Hussein Rustam and Melis Sosa. It features Sleepy Hallow visiting an alternate world with a futuristic city setting. He stops at a party where he meets a bartender who’s "not exactly what she seems to be at first", and rides around the city in a "high-tech car". It has over 177 million views on YouTube alone.

== Live performances ==
On July 13, 2021, Sleepy Hallow performed the song on the Open Mic of Genius.

== Remix ==
A remix featuring American rapper Coi Leray was released on July 28, 2021. Trent Clark of HipHopDX described Leray's feature as "patented, rapid-fire spills" that does not "belabor the song length". The remix also comes with an animated visualizer that finds the collaborators "outside on a cold and rainy night."

== Charts ==
=== Weekly charts ===
Weekly chart performance for "2055"
Chart (2021)	Peak position
Australia (ARIA)	13
Austria (Ö3 Austria Top 40)	56
Canada (Canadian Hot 100)	17
Czech Republic Singles Digital (ČNS IFPI)	38
Denmark (Tracklisten)	27
Ireland (IRMA)	21
Lithuania (AGATA)	23
Netherlands (Single Top 100)	93
New Zealand (Recorded Music NZ)	11
Norway (VG-lista)	40
Portugal (AFP)	41
Slovakia (Singles Digitál Top 100)	66
South Africa (RISA)	30
Sweden (Sverigetopplistan)	65
Switzerland (Schweizer Hitparade)	90
UK Singles (Official Charts)	21
UK Hip Hop/R&B (Official Charts)	7
US Billboard Hot 100	51
US Hot R&B/Hip-Hop Songs (Billboard)	15
US Rolling Stone Top 100	16

=== Year-end charts ===
Year-end chart performance for "2055"
Chart (2021)	Position
Australia (ARIA)	88
Canada (Canadian Hot 100)	61
US Hot R&B/Hip-Hop Songs (Billboard)	53

== Certifications ==
Certifications for "2055"
Region	Certification	Certified units/sales
Australia (ARIA)	2× Platinum	140,000^{‡}
Canada (Music Canada)	4× Platinum	320,000^{‡}
Denmark (IFPI Danmark)	Gold	45,000^{‡}
France (SNEP)	Gold	100,000^{‡}
New Zealand (RMNZ)	3× Platinum	90,000^{‡}
Poland (ZPAV)	Gold	25,000^{‡}
Portugal (AFP)	Gold	5,000^{‡}
United Kingdom (BPI)	Platinum	600,000^{‡}
United States (RIAA)	4× Platinum	4,000,000^{‡}
^{‡} Sales+streaming figures based on certification alone.
