= Marie (Sleepy Hallow song) =

2022 single by Sleepy Hallow

Single by Sleepy Hallow
- Released: November 2, 2022
- Length: 3:02
- Label: Winners Circle; RCA
- Songwriter: Tegan Chambers
- Producer: Great John

Sleepy Hallow singles chronology
"2 Mins of Pain" (2022)	"Marie" (2022)	"Pain Talk" (2023)

Music video
- "Marie" on YouTube

"Marie" is a single by American rapper Sleepy Hallow, released on November 2, 2022, with an accompanying music video. It was produced by Great John.

== Composition ==
The production uses a lo-fi guitar sound and a vocal sample, over which Sleepy Hallow performs in a melodic flow and details his love for a woman named Marie. In the intro, he asks listeners to join him in his emotional journey. In the chorus, Sleepy Hallow describes that Marie is only into real and unique things and does not waste her time, and expresses his worries that if it were not for his success, she would not be interested in him. The first verse is about his suggestion that they run away together to escape their problems and Marie turning down his offer as their love is already strong, which he agrees to. The second verse finds Sleepy Hallow drinking alcohol to relieve his pain and leaving Marie waiting for him at home. She is dissatisfied and he knows he needs to make amends.

== Music video ==
The music video was directed and animated by Tristan Zammit.

== Charts ==
Chart performance for "Marie"
Chart (2022)	Peak position
New Zealand Hot Singles (RMNZ)	16
