= 347aidan =

Canadian singer (born 2003)

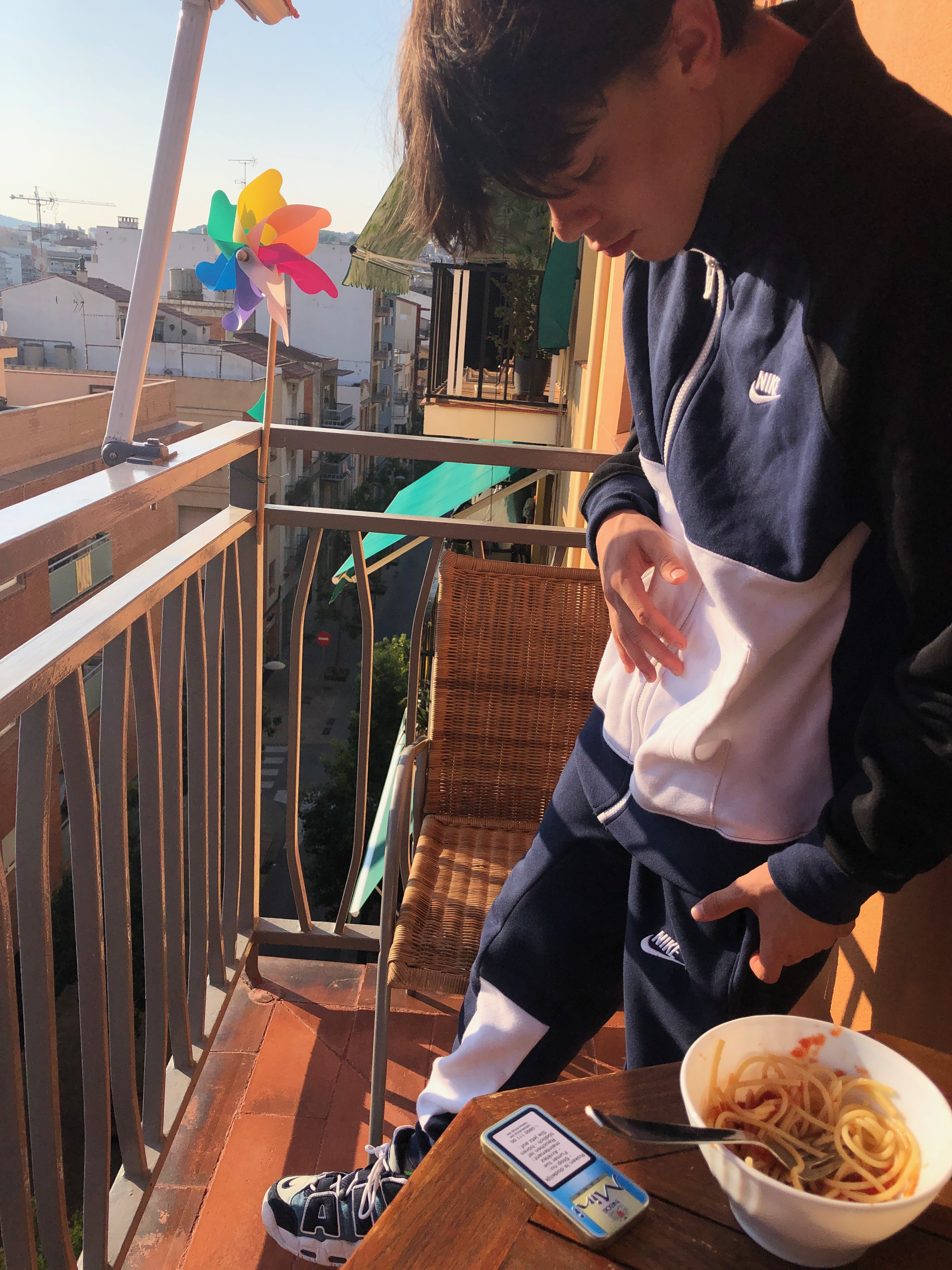

Background information
- Born: Aidan Fuller; June 8, 2003 (age 23); Cambridge, Ontario, Canada
- Genre: Hip-hop
- Occupations: Rapper; singer-songwriter
- Years active: 2018–present
- Label: Columbia

Aidan Fuller (born June 8, 2003), known professionally as 347aidan, is a Canadian rapper and singer-songwriter from Cambridge, Ontario. He is most noted as a two-time Juno Award nominee at the Juno Awards of 2022, receiving nods for Breakthrough Artist of the Year and Fan Choice.

== Career ==
Fuller began releasing music to Spotify in 2018, and broke through to wider attention in early 2021 when his single "Dancing in My Room" went viral on TikTok. The song was subsequently a nominee for the 2021 SOCAN Songwriting Prize. It was certified Platinum by Music Canada and the Recording Industry Association of America (RIAA).

He followed up in the fall with Chasing Harmony, his first EP.

On May 25, 2022, 347aidan was featured on American rapper Sleepy Hallow's single "Die Young".

On September 9, 2025, 347aidan appeared on the official anthem for the 2025 Valorant Champions tournament, titled "Last Shot", alongside the vocal duo Templuv. He later performed the song live at the Opening Ceremony of the tournament’s grand final on October 5, 2025, in Paris, France.

With the release of the video game NHL 24, he was featured in the soundtrack with the single Up and Down, on a collaboration with The Chainsmokers.
