= Anxiety (Sleepy Hallow song) =

2023 single by Sleepy Hallow featuring Doechii

Single by Sleepy Hallow featuring Doechii

from the album Boy Meets World
- Released: September 15, 2023
- Length: 2:28
- Label: Winners Circle; RCA
- Songwriters: Tegan Chambers; Jaylah Hickmon; Johnathan Scott; Luiz Bonfá; Wally De Becker; Karel Jorge
- Producer: Great John

Sleepy Hallow singles chronology
"For You" (2023)	"Anxiety" (2023)

Doechii singles chronology
"Booty Drop" (2023)	"Anxiety" (2023)	"Pacer" (2023)

Music video
- "Anxiety" on YouTube

"Anxiety" (stylized as "A N X I E T Y") is a song by American rapper Sleepy Hallow featuring American rapper and singer Doechii, released on September 15, 2023. It is the fifth single from the former's second studio album Boy Meets World, which was released the same day. Produced by Great John, this song contains a sample of the song "Anxiety" by Doechii, which itself samples "Somebody That I Used to Know" by Gotye featuring Kimbra.

At the APRA Music Awards of 2025, the song was nominated for Most Performed Hip Hop / Rap Work.

== Composition and release ==
The song finds Sleepy Hallow discussing his anxiety and vulnerabilities concerning mental health, such as his inability to think clearly or overcome his "demons", and how he aims to recover. In addition to this issue, he also denounces fame.

The chorus consists of a sample from "Anxiety" by Doechii. "Anxiety", which itself samples "Somebody That I Used to Know" by Gotye featuring Kimbra, was released on YouTube by Doechii in 2019. Additionally, "Somebody That I Used to Know" contains a sample of "Seville" by Luiz Bonfá. Following the song going viral on TikTok in March 2025, Doechii released it to streaming services.

== Music video ==
The music video was directed by Nimi Hendrix and released on September 27, 2023. It shows Sleepy Hallow in a recording studio. The clip also features "infrared visual effects and trippy cinematographic tactics".

== Charts ==
=== Weekly charts ===
Weekly chart performance for "Anxiety"
Chart (2023–2025)	Peak position
Australia (ARIA)	14
Australia Hip Hop/R&B (ARIA)	4
Austria (Ö3 Austria Top 40)	5
Belgium (Ultratop 50 Flanders)	49
Belgium (Ultratop 50 Wallonia)	41
Canada Hot 100 (Billboard)	25
Czech Republic Singles Digital (ČNS IFPI)	10
Denmark (Tracklisten)	36
France (SNEP)	27
Germany (GfK)	6
Global 200 (Billboard)	21
Greece International (IFPI)	14
Hungary (Single Top 40)	16
Ireland (IRMA)	12
Israel (Mako Hitlist)	48
Italy (FIMI)	66
Latvia Streaming (LaIPA)	1
Lithuania (AGATA)	6
Luxembourg (Billboard)	11
Malaysia International (RIM)	12
Middle East and North Africa (IFPI)	4
Netherlands (Single Top 100)	24
New Zealand (Recorded Music NZ)	5
Norway (VG-lista)	17
Romania Airplay (TopHit)	78
Saudi Arabia (IFPI)	7
Singapore (RIAS)	13
Slovakia Singles Digital (ČNS IFPI)	13
South Africa Streaming (TOSAC)	5
Sweden (Sverigetopplistan)	28
Switzerland (Schweizer Hitparade)	4
United Arab Emirates (IFPI)	6
UK Singles (Official Charts)	15
UK Hip Hop/R&B (Official Charts)	3
US Billboard Hot 100	45
US Hot R&B/Hip-Hop Songs (Billboard)	11
US Rhythmic (Billboard)	31

=== Monthly charts ===
2025 monthly chart performance for "Anxiety"
Chart (2025)	Peak position
Lithuania Airplay (TopHit)	39

== Certifications ==
Certifications for "Anxiety"
Region	Certification	Certified units/sales
Canada (Music Canada)	Platinum	80,000^{‡}
New Zealand (RMNZ)	Platinum	30,000^{‡}
United States (RIAA)	Gold	500,000^{‡}
^{‡} Sales+streaming figures based on certification alone.
