= Shmurda She Wrote =

EP by Bobby Shmurda
- Released: November 10, 2014
- Recorded: 2014
- Genre: Gangsta rap; hardcore hip-hop; trap
- Length: 15:12
- Label: Epic
- Producer: Jahlil Beats; Sha Money XL; The Breed; Dondre; Jugo

Bobby Shmurda chronology
Shmoney Shmurda (2014)	Shmurda She Wrote (2014)	Bodboy (2022)

Singles from Shmurda She Wrote
- 1. "Hot Nigga" Released: July 25, 2014; 2. "Bobby Bitch" Released: September 30, 2014

Professional ratings
Review scores
Source	Rating
AllMusic	3.4/5 stars
XXL	(L)

Shmurda She Wrote is the debut EP by American rapper Bobby Shmurda; it was released on November 10, 2014 by Epic Records.

== Singles ==
On July 25, 2014, the EP's debut single, "Hot Nigga" was released. The song was produced by Jahlil Beats. In an effort to promote the EP, Shmurda released "Bobby Bitch" on September 30, 2014.

=== Commercial performance ===
The EP debuted at number 79 on the Billboard 200 chart, selling 20,000 copies. Since its release, it has sold 106,000, including 85,000 album sales due to streaming. The EP charted on the Billboard 200 chart for two weeks total.

== Track listing ==
Credits adapted from Tidal.

Shmurda She Wrote
No.	Title	Writer(s)	Producer(s)	Length
1.	"Worldwide Nigga" (featuring Ty Real)	Ackquille Pollard; Tyler Smith; Keyon Harrold; Michael Clervoix; Todd Smith; Esteban Crandle; Rashad Johnson; Aaron Rogers	Sha Money XL; The Breed	3:09
2.	"Hot Nigga"	Pollard; Orlando Tucker	Jahlil Beats	3:14
3.	"Bobby Bitch"	Pollard; Dondre Dennis	Dondre	2:40
4.	"Living Life" (featuring Rowdy Rebel)	Pollard; Ludovic Antoine Jr.	Jugo	2:28
5.	"Wipe The Case Away" (featuring Ty Real)	Pollard; Smith; Clervoix; Todd Cochran	Sha Money XL	3:41
Total length:				15:12

== Charts ==
Chart (2014)	Peak position
US Billboard 200	79
US Top R&B/Hip-Hop Albums (Billboard)	7
US Top Rap Albums (Billboard)	5

== Certifications ==
Region	Certification	Certified units/sales
United States (RIAA)	Gold	500,000^{‡}
^{‡} Sales+streaming figures based on certification alone.
