= FM! =

Studio album by Vince Staples
- Released: November 2, 2018
- Studio: Conway; EastWest; Paramount; Sphere
- Genre: Hip-hop
- Length: 22:16
- Label: Blacksmith; Def Jam
- Producer: Cubeatz; Hagler; Kenny Beats; KillaGraham

Vince Staples chronology
Big Fish Theory (2017)	FM! (2018)	Vince Staples (2021)

FM! is the third studio album by American rapper Vince Staples, released on November 2, 2018, through Blacksmith Records and Def Jam Recordings. The album is primarily produced by Kenny Beats, with further production by Hagler, Cubeatz and KillaGraham, and features guest vocals from Kamaiyah, E-40, Jay Rock, Kehlani, Earl Sweatshirt, Buddy and Tyga, among others.

== Composition ==
Over the course of an approximately 22-minute runtime, the album is framed as a radio-station takeover, featuring recurring skits hosted by Los Angeles radio host Big Boy. According to NPR Music staff writer Rodney Carmichael, "FM! uses terrestrial radio — and longtime L.A. radio staple Big Boy's morning show — as a foil to offer subversive commentary on the ways and means black music is marketed for mass consumption. Even the features — Cali artists including Kamaiyah, E-40, Buddy, Kehlani and two diametrically opposed interludes from Earl Sweatshirt and Tyga — present a range of extremes that deconstruct the static separating radio and Internet, alternative and pop."

== Critical reception ==
FM! ratings
Aggregate scores
Source	Rating
AnyDecentMusic?	7.2/10
Metacritic	81/100
Review scores
Source	Rating
AllMusic	4.5/5 stars
Consequence	B+
DIY	4/5 stars
Exclaim!	8/10
Mojo	3/5 stars
NME	4/5 stars
Now	4/5
Pitchfork	8.2/10
Q	4/5 stars
XXL	4/5

FM! was met with widespread critical acclaim. At Metacritic, which assigns a normalized rating out of 100 to reviews from professional publications, the album received an average score of 81, based on 16 reviews. Aggregator AnyDecentMusic? gave it 7.2 out of 10, based on their assessment of the critical consensus.

Neil Z. Yeung of AllMusic gave the album a positive review stating, "Despite FM!'s brevity, Staples jams so much into every bar that it fully satiates, all while still managing to end so abruptly that it comes as a surprise. The electrifying thrill of FM! is a triumph for the rapper who remains at the top of his game". Pitchfork's Alphonse Pierre wrote, "Vince is at ease here, intertwining his personality into his somber celebration of Long Beach like never before. He's rapping his ass off, and hooks are mostly an afterthought. He dips in and out of inventive flows". Chris Gibbons of XXL wrote: "FM! is definitely more centrally focused than either of those EPs [2014's Hell Can Wait and 2016's Prima Donna]. And even if this is just an off-hand project Vince recorded quickly, it's a hell of a one-off album that's full of charm and lyrical depth paired with fantastic production. Tune in." NME critic Dhruva Balram said, "Each idea is significantly different from the last and this latest album is an immersive look at the grizzly realities of millions". Clayton Tomlinson of Exclaim! said, "Vince has managed to not only be acerbic but entertaining on his newest release. Its only drawback is its extremely short runtime". Nick Flanagan of Now concluded: "With production duties primarily hot potatoed between Hagler and Kenny Beats, the beats and feel are consistent and strong while not getting in the way of Staples' flow, which is elastic and modern without losing an inch of his clarity and bluntness."

Tommy Monroe of Consequence stated that "FM! features the rapper in his raw form and representing his love for the west coast. Whether you decide to hit play in chronological order or skip around, this album will have you bobbing your head at any point. FM! is a sunny day that not even being stuck in LA traffic can ruin". Will Richards from DIY stated, "While Big Fish Theory saw the rapper centre stage, relentless and omnipresent, on FM! he lets us tune in to a calmer world, one which he dips in and out of when he pleases, filling in the blanks and staying in the fast lane". Shea Serrano at The Ringer called the album "smart, and biting, and funny, and challenging, and a top-level examination of the caustic (and casual) existence of violence and death in an overlooked corner of America".

Less enthusiastic was Vice magazine's Robert Christgau, who expressed his disappointment in finding Staples "a lot better at tragedy than comedy" on the album. He rated it with a one-star honorable mention while picking "Feels Like Summer" and "Fun" as highlights.

=== Year-end lists ===
Select year-end rankings of FM!
Publication	List	Rank	Ref.
Complex	50 Best Albums of 2018	31	
Consequence	The Top 50 Albums of 2018	21	
NME	Best Albums of the Year 2018	30	
NPR Music	The 50 Best Albums of 2018	36	
Okayplayer	The Best Albums of 2018	14	
Pitchfork	The 50 Best Albums of 2018	26	
The Ringer	The Best Albums of 2018	4	
Rolling Stone	50 Best Albums of 2018	18	
Slant Magazine	The 25 Best Albums of 2018	14	
Stereogum	The Best Albums of 2018	14	

== Track listing ==
All tracks produced by Kenny Beats, except where noted.

FM! track listing
No.	Title	Writer(s)	Producer(s)	Length
1.	"Feels Like Summer"	Vincent Staples; Kenneth Blume III; Tyrone Griffin, Jr.		2:29
2.	"Outside!"	Staples; Blume		2:05
3.	"Don't Get Chipped"	Staples; Johnny McKinzie; Blume; Kevin Gomringer; Tim Gomringer	Kenny Beats; Cubeatz	2:28
4.	"Relay"	Staples; Marvin Thomas	Hagler	2:17
5.	"New EarlSweatshirt" (interlude)	Staples; Thebe Kgositsile; Blume		0:22
6.	"Run the Bands"	Staples; Thomas	Hagler	3:08
7.	"Fun!"	Staples; Thomas	Hagler; Kenny Beats^{[a]}	2:51
8.	"No Bleedin"	Staples; Kamaiyah Johnson; Blume		2:03
9.	"Brand New Tyga" (interlude)	Michael Stevenson; Blume		0:35
10.	"(562) 453-9382" (skit)	Kurt Alexander; Louie Genis; Christian Nava; Natalia Pérez; Blume		0:52
11.	"Tweakin'"	Staples; Kehlani Parrish; Blume; Graham Muron	Kenny Beats; KillaGraham	3:06
Total length:				22:16

Notes

- ^{^[a]} signifies additional production

== Personnel ==
Credits for FM! adapted from vinyl liner notes.

Vocalists

- Vincent Staples – vocals (tracks 1–4, 6–8 and 11)
- Earl Sweatshirt – vocals (track 5)
- Tyga – vocals (track 9)
- Ty Dolla Sign – additional vocals, transcription, contributor (track 1)
- Vonnie – additional vocals (tracks 1 and 11)
- James Larsen – additional vocals (track 2)
- Briana Lee – additional vocals (track 2)
- Adrian Tupas – additional vocals (track 2)
- Mila Tambaoan – additional vocals (track 2)
- Amos (Kaden) Chea – additional vocals (track 2)
- Jay Rock – additional vocals (track 3)
- E-40 – additional vocals (track 7)
- Kamaiyah – additional vocals (track 8)
- Kehlani – additional vocals (track 11)
- Buddy – additional vocals (track 11)

Technical personnel

- Tyler Page – recording engineering (tracks 1–8 and 11)
- Michael Law Thomas – recording engineering (tracks 2, 4, 6–8 and 11)
- James Royo – recording engineering (tracks 1 and 5)
- Christian "CQ" Quiñonez – recording engineering (track 9)
- Oliver "Odrizz" Krueger – assistant recording engineering (track 6)
- Derek "MixedByAli" Ali – mixing
- Aria Angel Ali – mixing
- Cyrus "NOIS" Taghipour – assistant mixing

== Charts ==
Chart performance for FM!
Chart (2018)	Peak position
Australian Albums (ARIA)	47
Belgian Albums (Ultratop Flanders)	129
Canadian Albums (Billboard)	44
Irish Albums (IRMA)	55
New Zealand Albums (RMNZ)	40
US Billboard 200	37
US Top R&B/Hip-Hop Albums (Billboard)	23

== See also ==
- The Who Sell Out, a 1967 concept album by the Who framed as a pirate radio show
- Dawn FM (2022) by the Weeknd, which features a similar radio aesthetic
