= Pointy Heights =

Studio album by Fousheé
- Released: September 13, 2024
- Length: 27:26
- Labels: Trackmasters; RCA

Fousheé chronology
Softcore (2022)	Pointy Heights (2024)

Singles from Pointy Heights
- 1. "Still Around" Released: July 30, 2024; 2. "War" Released: August 13, 2024; 3. "100 Bux" Released: August 27, 2024; 4. "Feel Like Home" Released: September 11, 2024

Pointy Heights is a studio album by the American singer-songwriter Fousheé. It was released on September 13, 2024, through Trackmasters Entertainment and RCA Records. The album follows her 2022 album Softcore, and was preceded by the singles "Still Around", "War", "100 Bux", and "Feel Like Home".

Fousheé named the album after land in Saint Catherine, Jamaica, connected to her family. The album received generally positive reviews from critics, who described it as a Caribbean-facing shift from the punk-influenced sound of Softcore, with reggae, ska, alternative R&B, indie rock, doo-wop, and synth-pop elements. It appeared on year-end album lists by KCRW, Complex, and Okayplayer.

== Background and recording ==
Fousheé's 2022 album Softcore was described by the Guardian as punk-inspired. She told W that touring that material left her wanting a reset, and that returning to Jamaica while making Pointy Heights made her feel more connected to the place than she had expected. In interviews with People and W, Fousheé said the album title refers to land in Saint Catherine that her grandfather purchased for relatives to build homes on. She also told People that she visited the area for the first time since childhood while making the album and later returned soon after.

Fousheé said in W that her mother, a drummer in the Jamaican all-woman band PEP, had taught her to harmonize and exposed her to Bob Marley's writing; Pointy Heights was influenced by Jamaican sound and culture.

== Music and lyrics ==
Pointy Heights contains 10 tracks and runs for 27 minutes. It is a pop/rock and R&B album, with styles including alternative R&B and alternative/indie rock. Writing for The Guardian, Ammar Kalia wrote that several songs use Jamaican rhythmic influences, and highlighted "war" and "birds, bees" as examples of the album's reggae-facing sound. Ana Lamond of Clash described the album as drawing from 1970s ska and reggae with a new wave element, and noted its use of doo-wop harmonies, grunge, synth-pop, and electronica. AllMusic's Andy Kellman described the album as post-punk in spirit and wrote that Caribbean elements recur throughout it.

Several sources discussed the album's use of samples and interpolations. People reported that "100 Bux" interpolates Musical Youth's "Pass the Dutchie", and that Fousheé reworked a reggae band's version of Diana Ross's "It's My House" for "Birds, Bees". Dazed also described "100 Bux" as ending with the chorus of "Pass the Dutchie". Fousheé told Rated R&B that "War" was intended as a bridge between her existing music and Jamaican music, and called it a modern interpretation of an early ska song.

== Release and promotion ==
Fousheé announced Pointy Heights on July 30, 2024, when she released "Still Around" as the album's lead single. The song was produced by Karriem Riggins and Steve Lacy.

"War" was released as the next single on August 13, 2024. "100 Bux" followed on August 27; Lacy co-produced it with Sir Dylan and Solomonophonic. On September 11, 2024, Fousheé released "Feel Like Home" as the third single from the album.

== Critical reception ==
Professional ratings
Review scores
Source	Rating
AllMusic	4/5 stars
Clash	8/10
The Guardian	4/5 stars

Ammar Kalia, reviewing Pointy Heights for the Guardian, wrote that the album moves Fousheé in a new direction and that its indie guitars distinguish it from the rest of her catalog. He described "100 Bux" and "Feel Like Home" favorably, but considered the synth-disco tracks "Loversland" and "Rice & Peas" less cohesive with the album's guitar-based sound. Lamond of Clash rated the album 8/10 and wrote that it connects Fousheé's interest in older Jamaican styles with contemporary production choices.

AllMusic's Kellman described Pointy Heights as more restrained than Softcore but more varied, writing that the album's Caribbean references and non-island tracks fit within Fousheé's broader sound. KEXP described the album as a fusion of pop, R&B, reggae, and soul, and commented on its percussion, vocals, and lyrics about family and home.

=== Accolades ===
Year-end rankings and listings for Pointy Heights
Publication	List	Rank	Ref.
AllMusic	Favorite Alternative & Indie Albums	unranked	
KCRW	The 30 Best Albums of 2024	23	
Complex	The 50 Best Albums of 2024	41	
Okayplayer	The 50 Best Albums of 2024	unranked	

== Track listing ==
Tracklist is adapted from Apple Music.

No.	Title	Length
1.	"Birds, Bees"	2:55
2.	"Do You Have a Soul?"	2:03
3.	"Feel Like Home"	2:40
4.	"100 Bux"	3:15
5.	"Loversland"	1:11
6.	"Closer"	2:51
7.	"War"	2:09
8.	"Rice & Peass"	3:15
9.	"Still Around"	3:37
10.	"Flowers"	3:30
Total length:		27:26

== Personnel ==
Selected credits are adapted from AllMusic.

- Fousheé - primary artist, production, songwriting
- Steve Lacy - production, songwriting
- Karriem Riggins - production, songwriting
- Neal H. Pogue - mixing
- Mike Bozzi - mastering
- Zachary Acosta - assistant engineering
- JC Chiam - engineering
- Karl Wingate - engineering
