= Vince Staples (album) =

Studio album by Vince Staples
- Released: July 9, 2021
- Genre: Hip-hop
- Length: 22:02
- Labels: Motown; Blacksmith
- Producer: Kenny Beats

Vince Staples chronology
FM! (2018)	Vince Staples (2021)	Ramona Park Broke My Heart (2022)

Singles from Vince Staples
- 1. "Law of Averages" Released: June 18, 2021; 2. "Are You with That?" Released: July 6, 2021

Vince Staples is the fourth studio album by American rapper Vince Staples. It was released on July 9, 2021, through Motown and Blacksmith Records. At 22 minutes and 2 seconds, it is the shortest album in Staples' discography. It features a single guest appearance from Fousheé; production was entirely handled by Kenny Beats, who had produced most tracks on FM! (2018).

The album received acclaim from critics, with the conversational lyrics and production highlighted.

== Background ==
Vince Staples' runtime is approximately 22 minutes, the same length as his last project, FM! The album, like his last, was produced by Kenny Beats.

Staples revealed the track list of the album via Instagram. He released the singles "Law of Averages" and "Are You with That?" on June 18 and July 6, 2021, respectively.

== Critical reception ==
Vince Staples ratings
Aggregate scores
Source	Rating
AnyDecentMusic?	7.8/10
Metacritic	84/100
Review scores
Source	Rating
AllMusic	4/5 stars
Beats Per Minute	83%
Clash	9/10
The Guardian	4/5 stars
The Independent	5/5 stars
MusicOMH	4/5 stars
NME	4/5 stars
Paste	8.2/10
Pitchfork	7.3/10
Rolling Stone	4/5 stars

Vince Staples was met with widespread critical acclaim. At Metacritic, which assigns a normalized rating out of 100 to reviews from professional publications, the album received an average score of 84, based on 20 reviews. Aggregator AnyDecentMusic? gave it 7.8 out of 10, based on their assessment of the critical consensus.

Alexis Petridis of The Guardian gave the album four stars out of five. He opined that the album's "spectral take on his region's G-funk, paired with conversational lyrics, deepens his outsider appeal". Kyann-Sian Williams of NME also gave the album four stars out of five, stating "The Long Beach rapper pairs playful one-liners with smouldering beats on his fourth full-length". Paste's Matt Mitchell gave the album an 8.2 out of 10, citing that the foundation of Staples' success "starts in the basement of survival, while other rappers punctuate their ladder-climbing with long bars about seven-figure houses, island getaways and private jets." PopMatters' John Amen gave the album a score of 8 out of 10, concluding, "With his latest jewel, Staples mines an artistic, existential, and notably fertile limbo." Matthew Davies Lombardi from DIY enjoyed the album, saying, "There's just enough instrumentation to add depth and texture to Vince's characteristically excellent delivery, but the rapper still stands front and centre, allowing a less bombastic tone to shine. ... If you arrive looking for the hooks of "Norf Norf" or the explosive chemistry of "BagBak" you could be leaving half empty-handed. But if you're here for Vince Staples, you might just see more of him than ever". Reviewing the album for AllMusic, Neil Z. Yeung stated, "Though the set feels somewhat sleepy upon first listen, repeat visits reward listeners with Staples' depth and wit, cementing Vince Staples as a simple yet focused statement from one of the West Coast's most relevant voices".

Beats Per Minute critic Chase McMullen said, "Vince Staples is certainly not an easy album to tap into, nor a particularly fun one, but for those interested in a piece of art in which the barrier between the creator and onlooker is veritably nonexistent, to the point of shared claustrophobia, look no further. ... Staples' scars have never been more visible: he's practically put them on display for the world at large. If that's not bravery, I don't know what is". Dylan Green of Pitchfork said, "Vince Staples has movement but lacks velocity, which casts his words in the most intimate light imaginable. ... Even if you're looking for the booming pastel energy of Kenny [Beats]'s recent collaboration with TiaCorine or the breathless vibes of his work on Vince's FM!, Vince Staples still has plenty to recommend. The sonic palette is grayscale without being boring, stoic without missing bounce".

=== Year-end lists ===
Select year-end rankings of Vince Staples
Publication	List	Rank	Ref.
Billboard	The 50 Best Albums of 2021	34	
Complex	The Best Albums of 2021	19	
Exclaim!	50 Best Albums of 2021	28	
The Fader	The 50 Best Albums of 2021	21	
Los Angeles Times	The 10 Best Albums of 2021	10	
NME	The 50 Best Albums of 2021	42	
NPR Music	The 50 Best Albums of 2021	9	
PopMatters	The 75 Best Albums of 2021	53	
Slant Magazine	The 50 Best Albums of 2021	45	
Time	The 10 Best Albums of 2021	2	

== Track listing ==
All tracks produced by Kenny Beats. Co-production credits listed below.

Vince Staples track listing
No.	Title	Writer(s)	Co-producer(s)	Length
1.	"Are You with That?"	Vincent Staples; Kenneth Blume III; Jacob Reske	Reske	2:18
2.	"Law of Averages"	Staples; Blume; Reske	Reske	2:19
3.	"Sundown Town"	Staples; Xavier Herrera; Giorgio Ligeon; Blume		2:31
4.	"The Shining"	Staples; Blume; James Colwell; Harper Gordon	WahWah James; Gordon	2:40
5.	"Taking Trips"	Staples; Blume; Ahmanti Booker; Doris Bright	Monte Booker	2:37
6.	"The Apple & the Tree"	Staples; Blume; Thomas Martin; Rory McDougall; Michael Meagher; Justin Marshall; Simon Marvin; Paul Bender		1:08
7.	"Take Me Home" (with Fousheé)	Staples; Britanny Fousheé; Blume; Martin; McDougall; Meagher; Marshall; Marvin; Bender		2:47
8.	"Lil Fade"	Staples; Blume; Majrooh Sultanpuri; Rajesh Roshan		2:12
9.	"Lakewood Mall"	Staples; Blume; Chuck Sibit		1:17
10.	"Mhm"	Staples; Blume; Nils Noehden	Nils	2:12
Total length:				22:02

Notes

- ^{^[c]} signifies a co-producer
- All tracks are stylized in all caps.
- "Taking Trips" contains a sample of "Days May Come, Days May Go", written by Doris Bright, as performed by the Utopian Concept.
- "The Apple and the Tree" and "Take Me Home" contain a sample of "Little Flower", written by Thomas Martin, Rory McDougall, Michael Meagher, Justin Marshall, Simon Marvin, and Paul Bender, and performed by the Putbacks.
- "Lil Fade" contains a sample of "Sannata, Pt. 1", written by Rajesh Roshan, and performed by Lata Mangeshkar.
- "Lakewood Mall" contains a sample of "Sad Day", written by Paul Johnson and Reginald Hathaway, as performed by Guitar Red.

== Personnel ==
- Vince Staples – vocals
- Emerson Mancini – mastering engineer
- Manny Marroquin – mix engineer
- Kenny Beats – recording engineer
- Anthony Vilchis – assistant mixer
- Chris Galland – assistant mixer
- Jeremie Inhaber – assistant mixer
- Zach Pereyra – assistant mixer
- Mama – vocals (6)
- Fousheé – vocals (7)
- Tyson – vocals (9)

== Charts ==
Chart performance for Vince Staples
Chart (2021)	Peak position
Australian Albums (ARIA)	32
Belgian Albums (Ultratop Flanders)	107
Canadian Albums (Billboard)	37
Irish Albums (IRMA)	73
Lithuanian Albums (AGATA)	25
New Zealand Albums (RMNZ)	19
Swiss Albums (Schweizer Hitparade)	55
UK R&B Albums (Official Charts)	24
US Billboard 200	21
US Top R&B/Hip-Hop Albums (Billboard)	14
