= Softcore (album) =

Studio album by Fousheé
- Released: November 18, 2022
- Recorded: 2021–2022
- Genre: Alternative rock; hip pop; hyperpop; punk rock; R&B
- Length: 27:12
- Label: Trackmasters; RCA
- Producer: 26 Girls; Bekon; Ben10k; BNYX; Danes Blood; Dirty Dave; Doc Daniel; The Donuts; Jack Gulielmetti; Miguel Angeles; Mike Seaberg; Noah McCorkle; Oscar Santander; Phoelix; Rob Bisel; Solomonophonic; Trevor Taylor; Zach Fogarty

Fousheé chronology
Time Machine (2021)	Softcore (2022)	Pointy Heights (2024)

Singles from Softcore
- 1. "I'm Fine" Released: May 20, 2022; 2. "Supernova" Released: October 28, 2022; 3. "Spend the Money" Released: November 16, 2022

Softcore (stylized as softCORE) is the debut studio album by American musician Fousheé. It was released on November 18, 2022, through Trackmasters Entertainment and RCA Records.

== Singles and promotion ==
On May 20, 2022, the first single, "I'm Fine", was released alongside the music video. On September 29, 2022, Fousheé released a visualizer for "Simmer Down". On October 28, 2022, Fousheé released the second single "Supernova" alongside the music video. On November 15, 2022, Fousheé released the third visual "Simulation". On November 18, 2022, Fousheé released the fourth visual, "Spend the Money", featuring Lil Uzi Vert.

== Critical reception ==
Professional ratings
Aggregate scores
Source	Rating
Metacritic	79/100
Review scores
Source	Rating
Beats Per Minute	76%
Pitchfork	6.8/10
Variety	95/100
The Telegraph	4/5 stars
DIY	4/4 stars

Softcore was met with generally positive reviews. At Metacritic, which assigns a rating out of 100 to reviews from professional publications, the album received a weighted average score of 79, based on four reviews.

DeAsia Paige for Pitchfork wrote that "Fousheé confronts a catharsis filled with unyielding rage, sass, lust, and anguish" across the album's twelve tracks while stating that the punk songs are "bold and mesmerizing, almost imposing, and it often makes the album’s R&B songs feel obsolete". Paige stated that "Fousheé shows she can masterfully camouflage her inner turmoil with a false sense of tranquility" on Softcore. She stated that Softcore's "pure R&B tracks pale in comparison to its grand punk displays". Concluding her review, Paige stated that "Fousheé’s voice is liberating and her songwriting bleeds with emotion" and that she has proven "that it’s possible for pop-punk and R&B to exist in the same space". Writing for Variety, Jem Aswad stated that Softcore is "the kind of kaleidoscopic, multi-genred, disruptively creative album that makes you feel like the artist was hiding something, or at least holding back." Aswad continued, "it sounds chaotic and it is, but what makes Foushee truly different is her songcraft", noting that "here those talents are mostly in the service of treading the line between beauty and noise". He concluded his review as he wrote that the album "is a jarring blast of melody and chaos that adds up to one of the year’s best and most exciting albums." Writing for The Telegraph, Thomas Hobb wrote that "Softcore is such an unpredictable thrill ride" while stating that Fousheé "needs [to] build on all the experimental ideas and not let them fizzle out too quickly in pursuit of the next trip." Concluding his review, he stated that, "had some of these songs been given a little longer to breathe, it would have been even greater". DIY's Elly Watson wrote that. the album "is the cathartic scream into the ether" to get rid of her insecurities. Watson wrote that it's "a fun and fiery record" is which "Fousheé excels when she pushes herself to her limits".

== Track listing ==
No.	Title	Writer(s)	Producer(s)	Length
1.	"Simmer Down"	Britanny Fousheé; Benjamin Saint-Fort	BNYX	2:44
2.	"I'm Fine"	Fousheé; Saint-Fort	BNYX; Mike Seaberg^{[a]}	1:40
3.	"Bored"	Fousheé; Jared Solomon	Solomonophonic	2:31
4.	"Supernova"	Fousheé; Dylan Teixeira; Michael Neil; Rob Bisel; Walter Williams	Phoelix; Rob Bisel; Noah McCorkle^{[b]}	1:31
5.	"Spend the Money" (featuring Lil Uzi Vert)	Fousheé; Miguel Angeles; Molly Ama Montgomery; Symere Woods	Angeles; Trevor Taylor^{[b]}	3:20
6.	"Die"	Fousheé; Benjamin Wilson; Dane McQuillan; David Marcus	Ben10k; Danes Blood; Dirty Dave	2:29
7.	"Simulation"	Fousheé; Saint-Fort	BNYX	0:51
8.	"Unexplainable"	Fousheé; Craig Balmoris; Daniel Tannenbaum; Sergiu Adrian Gherman; Tyler Reese Mehlenbacher	Bekon; The Donuts	1:40
9.	"Smile"	Fousheé; Saint-Fort; Deborah Jung; Liam Ryan Baker	26 Girls; BNYX	2:36
10.	"Stupid Bitch"	Fousheé; Jack Gulielmetti; Paul Daniel; Zach Fogarty	Doc Daniel; Fousheé; Gulielmetti; Fogarty	2:45
11.	"Scream My Name"	Fousheé; Fort	BNYX	1:53
12.	"Let U Back In"	Fousheé; Saint-Fort; Oscar Santander; Fogarty	BNYX; Santander; Fogarty	3:12
Total length:				27:12

Notes

- All tracks are stylized in all lowercase.
- ^{^[a]} signifies an additional producer.
- ^{^[b]} signifies an assistant producer.

== Personnel ==
- Dale Becker – mastering (tracks 1, 3–12)
- Jeff Ellis – mixing (1, 3–12)
- Jaycen Joshua – mastering, mixing (2)
- Spencer Dennis – engineering (1, 4, 5, 7, 9, 10, 12)
- Zach Fogarty – engineering (1)
- Hank Byerly – engineering (2)
- Solomonophonic – engineering (3)
- Rob Bisel – engineering (4)
- Dane McQuillan – engineering (6)
- Hope Brush – engineering (8)
- JC Chiam – engineering (10)
- Bnyx – engineering (11)
- Fili Filizzola – engineering assistance (1, 4–8, 10–12)
- Ivan Handwerk – engineering assistance (1, 3–12)
- Katie Harvey – engineering assistance (1, 4–8, 10–12)
- Noah McCorkle – engineering assistance (1, 3, 5–12)
- Trevor Taylor – engineering assistance (1, 3, 4–12)
- DJ Riggins – engineering assistance (2)
- Jacob Richards – engineering assistance (2)
- Mike Seaberg – engineering assistance (2)
- Chris Woods – strings (10)
