= Sleepy Hallow =

American rapper (born 1999)

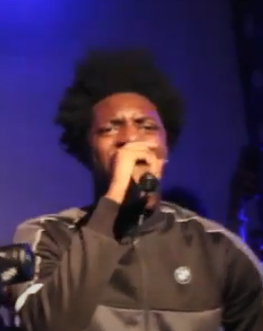
- Sleepy Hallow in 2019

Background information
- Born: Tegan Chambers; December 20, 1999 (age 26); Jamaica
- Origin: Flatbush Brooklyn, New York City, U.S
- Genres: East Coast hip-hop; Brooklyn drill; emo rap; R&B
- Occupations: Rapper; singer; songwriter
- Years active: 2017–present
- Labels: Winners Circle; RCA
- Website: winnerscirclestore.com

Tegan Joshua Anthony Chambers, known professionally as Sleepy Hallow, is a Jamaican-American rapper and singer-songwriter who specializes in Brooklyn drill. Born in Jamaica, Chambers was raised in Flatbush, Brooklyn, New York City, alongside frequent collaborator and co-founder of Winners Circle Entertainment Sheff G.

Signing with Winners Circle Entertainment in 2019, the label entered a joint venture with RCA Records the following year. Chambers first saw recognition for his verse on the Sheff G's 2019 single, "Flow". His 2020 single, "Deep End Freestyle" (featuring Fousheé) received platinum certification by the Recording Industry Association of America (RIAA) and marked his first entry on the Billboard Hot 100. His 2021 single, "2055" peaked at number 51 on the chart.

== Early life ==
As a child, Chambers immigrated from Jamaica to the Flatbush section of Brooklyn, New York City. Around the age of 12, he started to rap. He later picked the name "Sleepy Hallow" as his rap name as that was his name in the streets. Chambers dropped out of school in the ninth grade. He first met friend and collaborator Sheff G when the two were preparing to fight, but stopped when Sheff G was impressed with how Chambers carried himself.

== Career ==
He, Sheff G, and DizzyGotBands were signed to former NFL player Junior Galette's music record label Nula Entertainment from 2017 to 2018.

In 2019, Sleepy Hallow released his debut mixtape, Don't Sleep. In the same year, Winners Circle Entertainment was founded, with Sleepy Hallow as one of the first signees.

In 2020, he released his second mixtape, Sleepy for President. The mixtape featured the hit single "Deep End Freestyle" featuring Fousheé, which peaked on the U.S. Billboard Hot 100 chart at number 80 on June 20, 2020. The single has over 85 million streams and was certified gold by RIAA in August 2020.

In August 2020, Winners Circle Entertainment started a partnership with RCA Records. Sleepy Hallow and Sheff G released the single "Tip Toe", produced by Great John.

In June 2021, he released his first studio album, Still Sleep? The album includes the single, "2055", which was released alongside a video that sees an animated Sleepy Hallow in an alternate, futuristic universe. The single would be certified double platinum in March 2022.

In September 2022, he released his single "2 Mins of Pain".

In November 2022, he released the single "Marie".

In May 2023, Sleepy Hallow was charged in a 140-count indictment, as the district attorney's office said the gang is linked to 12 shootings and a murder that was caught on camera.

On September 15, 2023, Sleepy Hallow released “Boy Meets World", his second studio album since getting out of jail. It features songs such as "GBG" featuring Marshmello and "Anxiety" featuring Doechii.

On February 14, 2024, Sleepy Hallow released the single "Cupid's Guidance". On May 8, 2024, he released single "Winners In Paris".

== Personal life ==
On May 15, 2023, Chambers was indicted along with 32 other alleged gang members including Sheff G for a multitude of gang conspiracy charges. After serving a 8 month sentence, he was released in June of 2026.

Chambers supported the Donald Trump 2024 presidential campaign, attending a rally in the Bronx alongside Sheff G.

== Discography ==
=== Studio albums ===
List of studio albums, with selected chart positions, certifications and album names
Title	Album details	Peak chart positions								Certifications
Title	Album details	US	US R&B/HH	US Rap	AUS	CAN	DEN	NZ	SWE	Certifications
Still Sleep?	Released: June 2, 2021; Label: Winners Circle, RCA; Format: Digital download, streaming	16	10	9	90	15	38	39	50	RIAA: Gold; BPI: Silver; MC: Gold; RMNZ: Gold
Boy Meets World	Released: September 15, 2023; Label: Winners Circle, RCA; Format: Digital download, streaming	17	4	3	32	10	—	19	—	
Read This When You Wake Up	Released: December 13, 2024; Label: Winners Circle, RCA; Format: Digital download, streaming	—	—	—	—	—	—	—	—	
"—" denotes a recording that did not chart or was not released in that territory.

=== Mixtapes ===
Title	Mixtape details	Peak chart positions			
Title	Mixtape details	US	US R&B/HH	US Rap	CAN
Sleepy Hallow Presents: Sleepy for President	Released: June 5, 2020; Label: Winners Circle, Empire; Format: Digital download, streaming	48	32	25	61

=== Singles ===
==== As lead artist ====
List of singles, with selected chart positions, showing year released and album name
Title	Year	Peak chart positions								Certifications	Album
Title	Year	US	AUS	CAN	IRE	NZ	SWE	UK	WW	Certifications	Album
"Deep End Freestyle" (with Fousheé)	2020	80	—	69	—	—	—	93	—	RIAA: Platinum; BPI: Silver; RMNZ: Gold	Sleepy Hallow Presents: Sleepy for President
"Don't Panic"	2020	—	—	—	—	—	—	—	—		Sleepy Hallow Presents: Sleepy for President
"Baddie Betty Boop"	2020	—	—	—	—	—	—	—	—		Sleepy Hallow Presents: Sleepy for President
"Anxiety Freestyle"	2020	—	—	—	—	—	—	—	—		Sleepy Hallow Presents: Sleepy for President
"Tip Toe" (with Sheff G)	2020	—	—	—	—	—	—	—	—	RIAA: Gold	Still Sleep?
"2055" (solo or remix featuring Coi Leray)	2021	51	13	17	21	11	65	21	—	RIAA: 4× Platinum; ARIA: 2× Platinum; BPI: Platinum; MC: 4× Platinum; RMNZ: 3× Platinum	Still Sleep?
"Die Young" (featuring 347aidan)	2022	60	38	15	—	— (Note: "Die Young" did not enter the NZ Top 40 Singles Chart, but peaked at number five on the NZ Hot Singles Chart.)	— (Note: "Die Young" did not enter the Swedish Singellista Chart, but peaked at number 17 on the Swedish Heatseeker Chart.)	45	—	RIAA: Platinum; BPI: Silver; MC: Platinum; RMNZ: Gold	Boy Meets World
"2 Mins of Pain" (featuring Alborosie)	2022	—	—	—	—	— (Note: "2 Mins of Pain" did not enter the NZ Top 40 Singles Chart, but peaked at number 36 on the NZ Hot Singles Chart.)	—	—	—		Non-album singles
"Marie"	2022	—	—	—	—	— (Note: "Marie" did not enter the NZ Top 40 Singles Chart, but peaked at number 16 on the NZ Hot Singles Chart.)	—	—	—		Non-album singles
"Pain Talk" (featuring Lil Tjay)	2023	—	—	—	—	— (Note: "Pain Talk" did not enter the NZ Top 40 Singles Chart, but peaked at number 24 on the NZ Hot Singles Chart.)	—	—	—		Boy Meets World
"Good Girls Ain't No Fun"	2023	—	—	—	—	— (Note: "Good Girls Ain't No Fun" did not enter the NZ Top 40 Singles Chart, but peaked at number 32 on the NZ Hot Singles Chart.)	—	—	—		Boy Meets World
"GBG" (featuring Marshmello)	2023	—	—	—	—	— (Note: "GBG" did not enter the NZ Top 40 Singles Chart, but peaked at number 25 on the NZ Hot Singles Chart.)	—	—	—		Boy Meets World
"Anxiety" (featuring Doechii)	2023	45	14	25	12	5	28	15	21	RIAA: Gold; MC: Platinum; RMNZ: Platinum	Boy Meets World
"Winners in Paris"	2024	—	—	—	—	— (Note: "Winners in Paris" did not enter the NZ Top 40 Singles Chart, but peaked at number 36 on the NZ Hot Singles Chart.)	—	—	—		Read This When You Wake Up
"Calm 3"	2025	—	—	—	—	— (Note: "Calm 3" did not enter the NZ Top 40 Singles Chart, but peaked at number 37 on the NZ Hot Singles Chart.)	—	—	—		Non-album single
"—" denotes a recording that did not chart or was not released in that territory.

==== As featured artist ====
List of singles as a featured artist, showing year released and album name
Title	Year	Album
"Panic" (Sheff G featuring Sleepy Hallow and Double G)	2017	Non-album singles
"Hurtin'" (Sheff G featuring Sleepy Hallow)	2017	Non-album singles
"Automatic" (Sheff G featuring Sleepy Hallow)	2018	The Unluccy Luccy Kid
"Addicted to the Cash" (Sheff G featuring Sleepy Hallow)	2018	Non-album singles
"Panic 2" (Sheff G featuring Sleepy Hallow)	2018	Non-album singles
"Panic 3" (Sheff G featuring Sleepy Hallow)	2018	Non-album singles
"Flows, Pt.2" (Sheff G featuring Sleepy Hallow)	2019	The Unluccy Luccy Kid
"Brazy" (J.I the Prince of N.Y featuring Sleepy Hallow)	2019	Non-album single
"Make It Happen" (Sheff G featuring Sleepy Hallow)	2020	Just 4 Yall
"Goat Freestyle" (Eli Fross featuring Sleepy Hallow)	2020	Cesar
"Run It Up" (Sheff G featuring Sleepy Hallow and A Boogie wit da Hoodie)	2021	From The Can
"No Love" (Fredo Bang featuring Sleepy Hallow)	2022	Two-Face Bang 2
"Bad Days" (Eli Fross featuring Sleepy Hallow)	2022	The Golden Child

=== Other charted and certified songs ===
Title	Year	Peak chart positions	Certifications	Album
Title	Year	NZ Hot	Certifications	Album
"Breakin Bad (Okay)" (featuring Sheff G)	2019	—	RIAA: Gold	Don't Sleep
"Molly" (featuring Sheff G)	2020	—	RIAA: Platinum; RMNZ: Gold	Sleepy Hallow Presents: Sleepy For President
"Weight On Me" (with Sheff G)	2020	—	RIAA: Gold; RMNZ: Gold	One and Only
"Basketball Dreams (Intro)"		—	RIAA: Gold	Still Sleep?
"Scrub"	2021	39		Still Sleep?
"1999"	2021	—	RIAA: Gold	Still Sleep?
"Lowkey"	2021	—	RIAA: Gold	Still Sleep?
"Driver's Seat (Intro)"	2023	25		Boy Meets World
"All the Way"	2023	33		Boy Meets World
"—" denotes a recording that did not chart or was not released in that territory.

=== Guest appearances ===
List of non-single guest appearances, with other performing artists, showing year released, certifications and album name
Title	Year	Other artist(s)	Certifications	Album
"Flows"	2019	Sheff G	RMNZ: Gold	The Unluccy Luccy Kid
"Demon Flow"	2020	Yak Yola, Sheff G		Misunderstood
"Wet Em Up Pt.2"	2020	Lil Tjay, Sheff G		State of Emergency
"Lil Big Bro Shit"	2020	Sheff G		One and Only
"Head Tap"	2020	Pressa, Sheff G		Gardner
"Goat Freestyle"	2020	Eli Fross		Cesar
"2020 Vision"	2021	DJ Drewski, Sheff G		Seat at the Table
"Steppas Freestyle"	2021	Eli Fross		The Book of Eli
"Run Up"	2021	Hamo Crime, mauley G, Sheff G, Rah Swish		Year of the H 3
"Like Me"	2022	Sheff G		From The Can
"Bad Breed"	2022	Sheff G		From The Can
"Overseas"	2022	Jay Bezzy, Sheff G		From The Can
