= Deep End Freestyle =

2020 single by Sleepy Hallow and Fousheé

Single by Sleepy Hallow and Fousheé

from the album Sleepy Hallow Presents: Sleepy for President
- Released: April 3, 2020
- Genre: Drill
- Length: 1:55
- Label: Empire
- Songwriters: Tegan Chambers; Britanny Fousheé; Johnathan Scott; Karel Jorge; Jeremy Soto
- Producer: Great John

Sleepy Hallow singles chronology
"Forrest Gump Remix" (2019)	"Deep End Freestyle" (2020)	"Head Tap" (2020)

Fousheé singles chronology
"Expectations" (2020)	"Deep End Freestyle" (2020)	"Single AF" (2020)

Music video
- "Deep End Freestyle" on YouTube

"Deep End Freestyle" is a song by American rapper Sleepy Hallow and American singer Fousheé. It was released on April 3, 2020 by Winners Circle Entertainment, and is the lead single from his mixtape Sleepy Hallow Presents: Sleepy for President (2020). Produced by Great John, the song features a sample of "Deep End" by Fousheé. The song is the first charting song on the Billboard Hot 100 for both artists, peaking at number 80. It went viral via TikTok.

== Composition ==
The song uses with a drill instrumental that comes along with a sample of looped vocals sung by Fousheé on her song "Deep End": "I been trying not to go off the deep end, I don't think you wanna give me a reason". Sleepy Hallow raps one verse, with no chorus.

== Charts ==
Chart (2020)	Peak position
Canada (Canadian Hot 100)	69
UK Singles (OCC)	93
US Billboard Hot 100	80

== Certifications ==
Region	Certification	Certified units/sales
New Zealand (RMNZ)	Gold	15,000^{‡}
United Kingdom (BPI)	Silver	200,000^{‡}
United States (RIAA)	Platinum	1,000,000^{‡}
^{‡} Sales+streaming figures based on certification alone.
