= Stoopid (6ix9ine song) =

Single by 6ix9ine featuring Bobby Shmurda

from the album Dummy Boy
- Released: October 5, 2018
- Recorded: 2018
- Genre: Hip-hop; trap; hardcore hip-hop
- Length: 2:32
- Label: ScumGang; 10K
- Songwriters: Daniel Hernandez; Andrew Green; Ackquille Pollard; Brytavious Chambers; Gibran Jairam
- Producer: Tay Keith

6ix9ine singles chronology
"Bebe" (2018)	"Stoopid" (2018)	"International Gangstas" (2018)

Bobby Shmurda singles chronology
"Bodies" (2014)	"Stoopid" (2018)

Music video
- "STOOPID" on YouTube

"Stoopid" (stylized in all caps) is a song by American rapper 6ix9ine featuring American rapper Bobby Shmurda. It was produced by Tay Keith, and released by ScumGang Records and 10K Projects on October 5, 2018, as the fourth and final single from the former's debut studio album, Dummy Boy. It peaked at number 25 on the US Billboard Hot 100, and received platinum certification by the Recording Industry Association of America (RIAA).

== Lyrics and composition ==
"Stoopid" features a trap beat and a siren. Bobby Shmurda's verse is rapped over a phone due to him being imprisoned at the time of the collaboration with 6ix9ine. In the song, 6ix9ine insults radio personality Ebro Darden, saying, "That nigga Ebro, he a bitch/Just another old nigga on a young nigga dick". The lyrics were in response to a feud the two had been engaged in.

== Critical reception ==
The song received mixed reviews from outlets. Although praising the "evil charm" of the song, Craig Jenkins of Vulture felt that it "cannibaliz[ed] flows and jokes from older 6ix9ine songs". Writing for Consequence of Sound, Wren Graves praised Bobby Shmurda's verse. Contrary to Graves' praise, Rolling Stone's Mose Reeves found Shmurda's verse "Hissy" and "Literally phoned in". Reviewing Dummy Boy for HipHopDX, Kyle Eustice called the song a "banger that seemingly sets a rowdy tone for the rest of the 34-minute effort", but added that it set up the listener for disappointment.

== Music video ==
The music video was released the same day as the song's release. Directed by TrifeDrew, William Asher and TheDonCanon of Figure Eight Creative Group, the video features 6ix9ine driving through a desert in a rainbow colored Ferrari and riding roller coasters at IMG Worlds of Adventure in Dubai.

== Chart performance ==
Chart (2018–19)	Peak position
Australia (ARIA)	63
Austria (Ö3 Austria Top 40)	48
Canada (Canadian Hot 100)	22
Germany (GfK)	57
Sweden (Sverigetopplistan)	25
Switzerland (Schweizer Hitparade)	28
UK Singles (OCC)	34
US Billboard Hot 100	25
US Hot R&B/Hip-Hop Songs (Billboard)	15

== Certifications ==
Region	Certification	Certified units/sales
United States (RIAA)	Platinum	1,000,000^{‡}
^{‡} Sales+streaming figures based on certification alone.
