= Bobby Shmurda =

American rapper, songwriter, and criminal (born 1994)

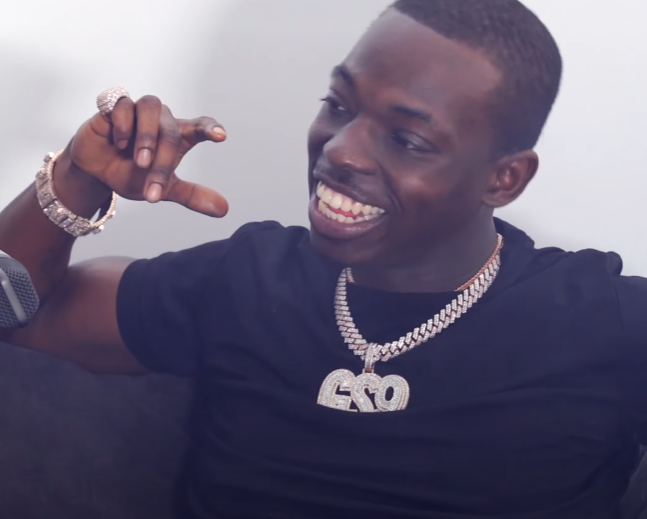
- Shmurda in 2021

Background information
- Born: Ackquille Jean Pollard; August 4, 1994 (age 32); Miami, Florida, U.S.
- Origin: Brooklyn, New York City, U.S.
- Genres: East Coast hip-hop; Brooklyn drill
- Occupations: Rapper; songwriter
- Years active: 2013–2016; 2021–present
- Labels: GS9; ONErpm; Epic; Roc Nation
- Criminal information
- Status: Released from Clinton Correctional Facility, on parole (2021)
- Convictions: Third-degree conspiracy and one count of weapons possession (2016); Sneaking a shiv in prison (2017)
- Penalty: 7 years imprisonment (2016); 4 years imprisonment (2017) – served concurrently

Ackquille Jean Pollard (born August 4, 1994), known professionally as Bobby Shmurda, is an American rapper and songwriter. Along with Rowdy Rebel, Shmurda is considered a pioneer of Brooklyn drill music. He rose to international fame in 2014 when his single "Hot Nigga" peaked at number six on the Billboard Hot 100. Its success led him to sign with Epic Records to release his debut extended play (EP), Shmurda She Wrote (2014).

In December 2014, New York City Police arrested Shmurda and charged him and several other members of GS9 with conspiracy to murder, weapons possession, and reckless endangerment. In 2016, he pleaded guilty and was sentenced to seven years in prison, which was reduced to five years after he received credit for the two years he served awaiting trial. After over six years in prison, Shmurda was released from Clinton Correctional Facility in February 2021. His release was celebrated in the hip-hop community.

== Early life ==
Ackquille Jean Pollard was born on August 4, 1994, in Miami, Florida. His mother is Vincentian and his father is Jamaican. He and his mother moved to East Flatbush, Brooklyn, after his father was incarcerated. Pollard had run-ins with the law in Brooklyn, including 15 months spent in detention for probation violation and an arrest on gun charges that were later dropped. According to his 2014 indictment, Pollard was the ringleader of a criminal enterprise called "GS9" that regularly entered into disputes with criminal gangs, was responsible for murders and non-fatal shootings, and engaged in drug trafficking along Kings Highway to East Flatbush.

== Career ==
The first song Pollard remixed was Crime Mob's "Knuck If You Buck", but he received little attention until the 2014 release of his song "Hot Nigga". The song uses the instrumental from Lloyd Banks's 2012 song "Jackpot". The song and its accompanying video went viral shortly after being uploaded to YouTube in the spring of 2014. Shmurda's signature "Shmoney dance", which he performs in the video, became an internet meme and featured in numerous popular Vines from the latter half of 2014; Beyoncé and Jay-Z replicated it during their On the Run Tour and Canadian rapper Drake did so while hosting the 2014 ESPY Awards. Several rappers freestyled over its instrumental, including Juicy J, French Montana, Lil' Kim, Gunplay, and T.I. Shmurda signed with Epic Records, which released "Hot Nigga" as his debut single. The song topped the Hot R&B/Hip-Hop songs chart, and peaked at number 6 on the Billboard Hot 100, eventually being certified platinum by the Recording Industry Association of America. The video had over 649 million views on YouTube as of July 2020. The song's official remix—featuring guest vocals from Fabolous, Chris Brown, Jadakiss, Rowdy Rebel, Busta Rhymes, and Yo Gotti—was released on September 4, 2014. Also in August 2014, a reggae remix of the song was released that featured Junior Reid, Mavado, Popcaan, and Jah X. Shmurda also became known for his song "Bobby Bitch", which peaked at number 92 on the Billboard Hot 100. His debut EP, Shmurda She Wrote, was released on November 10, 2014.

Shmurda's debut studio album with Epic Records was scheduled for release in 2016 and was to be produced by Jahlil Beats. It was postponed because of his imprisonment. In February 2017, Shmurda freestyled for rapper Meek Mill and said he was writing music in prison. The following year, he featured on 6ix9ine's single "Stoopid", phoning in his verses over the prison telephone. The single peaked at number 25 on the Billboard Hot 100.

Shmurda made his first concert performance appearance since being released from prison at Rolling Loud Festival in Miami on July 23, 2021.

On September 3, 2021, Shmurda released his first single since his release from jail, "No Time for Sleep (Freestyle)". On March 27, 2022, after years of conflict with Epic Records, his request for release was approved and finalized.

Shmurda has called hip-hop "very dangerous" to kids and tried to distance himself from mainstream hip-hop culture. He has also expressed disinterest in releasing new music.

In July 2023, Shmurda announced he had been writing an autobiography.

In May 2025, Shmurda's Still Alive Tour was canceled shortly before its scheduled start. He addressed the cancellation on Instagram, apologizing to fans and attributing the situation to disputes with booking agents Philip Stengel (Halo Touring) and Sergio Patillo (Oakstreet Media), alleging mismanagement and hinting at potential legal action. Stengel publicly denied Shmurda's claims and said the tour was canceled due to low ticket sales, averaging around 10 per city. Stengel shared data suggesting poor demand, including screenshots of venues where only a handful of tickets, or none, had been sold. He emphasized that the issue was not promotion, but lack of audience interest, calling the tour "not viable under any circumstances". The 19-date tour had been set to run from May 15 to June 19, with stops in cities such as Washington, D.C., Los Angeles, Houston, and Boston.

In December 2025, Shmurda was involved in a significant physical altercation with a fan during a nightclub performance in Minnesota. During the incident, a bottle was hurled at him and he threw a mic at the fan, with the latter incident recorded on camera. No physical injuries were reported.

== Criminal conviction ==
On June 3, 2014, Shmurda was arrested and charged with felony criminal possession of a weapon. Police say they saw him flashing the gun in an apartment, and when they went to investigate he tried to hide it in a couch. He was set free on $10,000 bail. On December 17, police arrested Shmurda and charged him with conspiracy, reckless endangerment, and drug and gun possession; charges against the others included murder, attempted murder, assault, and drug dealing. Shmurda pleaded not guilty and was held on $2 million bail. Police said they had been investigating the gang for murder and shooting indiscriminately at crowds in public places long before Shmurda rose to fame. Police said Shmurda was "the driving force" in a gang also known as GS9 (standing for "Grimey Shooters", "Gun Squad", or "G Stone Crips"), the name of his label, as they dealt crack cocaine and waged deadly battles with rival gangs for territory. He faced a maximum sentence of 8–25 years.

James Essig, head of the NYPD unit that made the arrests, said Shmurda's songs and videos were "almost like a real-life document of what they were doing on the street." In his song "Hot Nigga", Shmurda raps, "I been selling crack since like the fifth grade" because "Jaja taught me"; Shmurda also rapped about his crew's past and future murders. In interviews, Shmurda has said that the lyrics represent his real life, though the Supreme Court of New Jersey ruled in 2014 that lyrics cannot be read at trial as evidence unless they have a "strong nexus" to a specific crime. While incarcerated, Shmurda was involved in a fight suspected to be related to the Bloods vs. Crips rivalry.

Between late June and early July 2015, Shmurda and his ex-girlfriend were caught by officials after smuggling a knife into Rikers Island jail. Both were charged with two counts of promoting contraband and one count of criminal possession of a weapon in the fourth degree, which could result in an additional seven-year sentence. Shmurda appeared in the Bronx Supreme Court to face his charges of prison contraband plus 25 years for his previous charge in 2014. He and his ex-girlfriend pleaded not guilty to the contraband charge, but Shmurda was still facing a maximum sentence of 25 years for the drug and gun charges.

=== Conviction ===
On September 9, 2016, as part of a plea deal, Shmurda pleaded guilty to one count of third-degree conspiracy and one count of weapons possession, and was sentenced to seven years in prison. Under the deal, he could not appeal the sentence, but was to be given credit for two years served, leaving five years left on his sentence, followed by five years of probation. His lawyer, Alex Spiro, expected that with good behavior Shmurda would serve approximately three and a half years. In early 2017, Shmurda was given a four-year sentence for sneaking a makeshift knife (shiv) into his cell. The sentence was to run concurrently to his ongoing seven-year sentence, so that he would not face any additional prison time.

=== Incarceration ===
Shmurda was first imprisoned in Rikers Island. He was involved in numerous incidents while incarcerated. In May 2015, he took part in a brawl that included members from the Bloods and Crips street gangs. In November 2016, Shmurda was involved in a brawl between several inmates that led to him losing phone privileges for an unspecified period and being put in solitary confinement for a month. In 2017, he was moved to Clinton Correctional Facility in upstate New York, to finish his sentence in protective custody.

Images of Shmurda while incarcerated surfaced online after three years served of the five-year sentence.

=== Release ===
A hearing in the week of August 18, 2020, denied Shmurda parole.

Shmurda's conditional release date was set to December 11, 2020, after serving his full sentence, by his parole board, but after a review by the Department of Corrections, his credit for good institutional behavior was restored, qualifying him for conditional release on February 23, 2021, with the rest of his sentence to be served on parole.

Shmurda was released on February 23, 2021, under supervision by fellow community members in Kings County, New York. His supervised release was scheduled to last until February 23, 2026. Rapper Quavo picked up Shmurda from prison on February 23, 2021.

== Discography ==
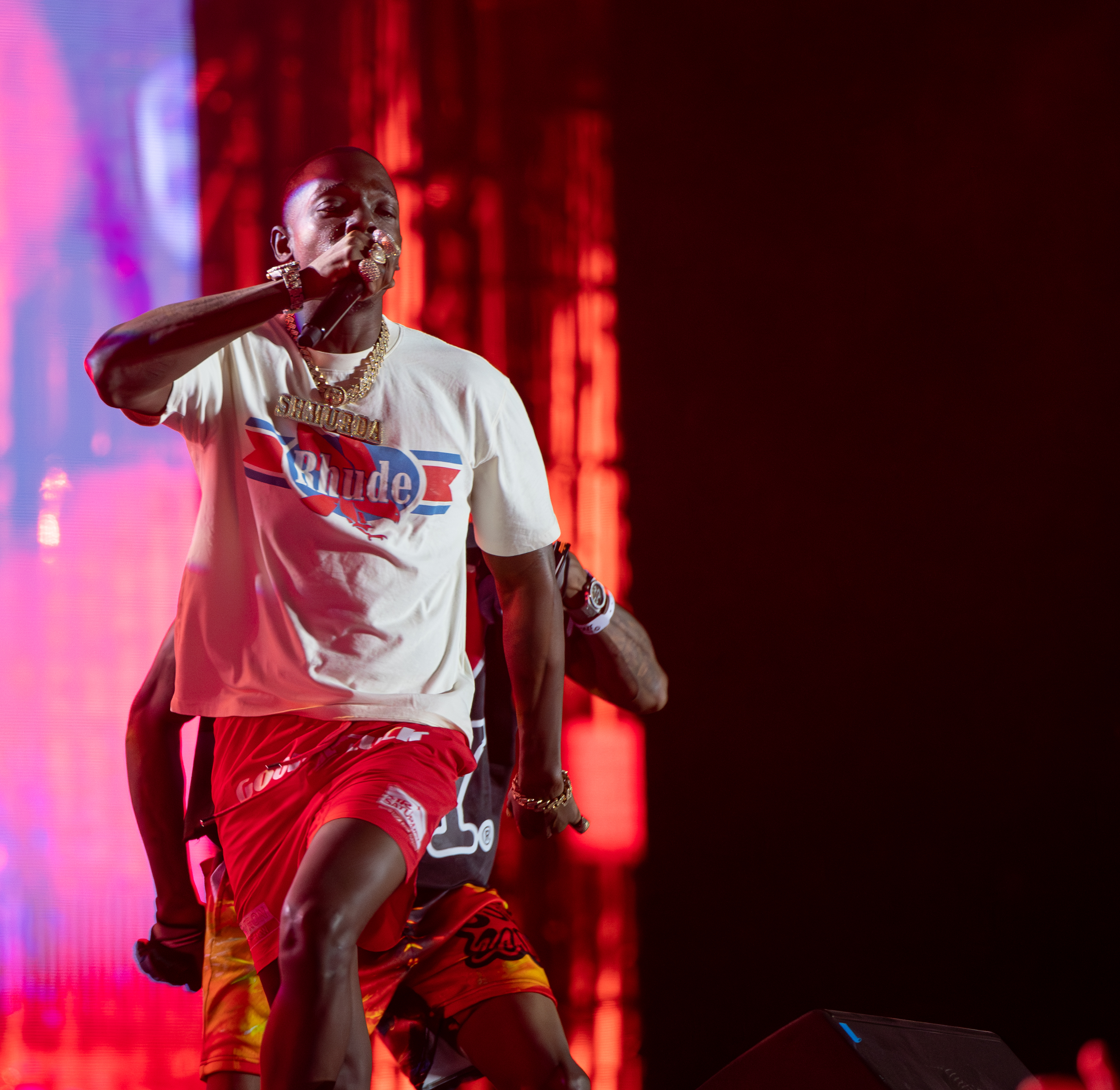
Shmurda performing in 2024

=== Mixtapes ===
List of mixtapes, with selected details
Title	Mixtape details
Shmoney Shmurda (with GS9)	Released: July 8, 2014; Label: GS9; Format: Digital download
Shmurdaville	Released: October 14, 2014; Label: GS9, Shmurdaville; Format: Digital download
SHMURDAGOTCASH (with lougotcash)	Released: October 28, 2022; Label: GS9; Format: Digital download

=== Extended plays ===
List of extended plays, with selected details
Title	EP details	Peak chart positions			Certifications
Title	EP details	US	US R&B/HH	US Rap	Certifications
Shmurda She Wrote	Released: November 10, 2014 (US); Label: Epic; Formats: Digital download	79	7	5	RIAA: Gold
Bodboy	Released: August 5, 2022; Label: GS9, ONErpm; Formats: Digital download	—	—	—	
"—" denotes a recording that did not chart or was not released in that territory.

=== Singles ===
==== As lead artist ====
List of singles as lead artist, with selected chart positions and certifications, showing year released and album name
Title	Year	Peak chart positions							Certifications	Album
Title	Year	US	US R&B/HH	US Rap	CAN	FRA	NZ Hot	UK	Certifications	Album
"Hot Nigga"	2014	6	1	1	34	131	—	74	RIAA: 5× Platinum; BPI: Platinum	Shmurda She Wrote
"Bobby Bitch"	2014	92	25	21	—	—	—	—	RIAA: Platinum	Shmurda She Wrote
"No Time for Sleep (Freestyle)"	2021	— (Note: "No Time for Sleep (Freestyle)" did not enter the US Billboard Hot 100, but peaked at number seven on the Bubbling Under Hot 100 chart.)	—	—	—	—	35	—		Non-album singles
"Shmoney" (featuring Quavo and Rowdy Rebel)	2021	—	—	—	—	—	—	—		Non-album singles
"Cash Out" (with Sidepiece)	2025	— (Note: "Cash Out" did not enter the US Billboard Hot 100, but peaked at number eight on the Dance Digital Song Sales chart.)	—	—	—	—	—	—		Non-album singles
"—" denotes a recording that did not chart or was not released in that territory.

==== As featured artist ====
List of singles as featured artist, with selected chart positions and certifications, showing year released and album name
Title	Year	Peak chart positions							Certifications	Album
Title	Year	US	US R&B/HH	AUS	AUT	CAN	NZ Hot	UK	Certifications	Album
"How Can I Lose" (YT Triz featuring Bobby Shmurda)	2014	—	—	—	—	—	—	—		Tales from Crime Hill
"Body Dance" (Uncle Murda featuring Bobby Shmurda)	2014	—	—	—	—	—	—	—		non-album single
"Computers" (Rowdy Rebel featuring Bobby Shmurda)	2014	—	—	—	—	—	—	—	RIAA: Gold	Shmoney Shmurda
"Bodies" (Chinx featuring Bobby Shmurda and Rowdy Rebel)	2014	—	—	—	—	—	—	—		non-album single
"Stoopid" (6ix9ine featuring Bobby Shmurda)	2018	25	15	63	48	22	5	34	RIAA: Platinum	Dummy Boy
"Tata (Remix)" (Eladio Carrión, J Balvin and Daddy Yankee featuring Bobby Shmurda)	2021	—	—	—	—	—	—	—		TBA
"Cool Like That" (Loud Luxury featuring Bobby Shmurda)	2024	—	—	—	—	—	—	—		non-album single
"—" denotes a recording that did not chart or was not released in that territory.

=== Guest appearances ===
List of non-single guest appearances, with other performing artists, showing year released and album name
Title	Year	Other artist(s)	Album
"Hit Em Hard"	2014	The Game, Freddie Gibbs, Skeme	Blood Moon: Year of the Wolf
"24 Hours (Remix)"	2014	TeeFLii, Ty Dolla $ign	—N/a
"On My Way"	2014	Rich the Kid, Rowdy Rebel	Rich Than Famous
"Celebration"	2014	Shy Glizzy	Law 3: Now or Never
"Block Boy"	2014	Foolie Tha Prince, Gusto Tha Animal	—N/a
"Shmoney Never Stop"	2015	Migos	Migo Lingo
"Right Now"	2016	Rowdy Rebel, French Montana	Shmoney Keeps Calling
"She All About Her Shmoney"	2016	Rowdy Rebel, Too $hort	Shmoney Keeps Calling
"Time Ticking"	2016	Juelz Santana, Dave East, Rowdy Rebel	—N/a
"Ngannou"	2024	Kalash Criminel	Bon Courage
