= Hot Nigga =

2014 single by Bobby Shmurda

Single by Bobby Shmurda

from the EP Shmurda She Wrote
- Released: July 25, 2014
- Recorded: 2013
- Genre: Gangsta rap
- Length: 3:18
- Label: Epic; GS9
- Songwriters: Ackquille Pollard; Orlando Tucker
- Producer: Jahlil Beats

Bobby Shmurda singles chronology
"Hot Nigga" (2014)	"Bobby Bitch" (2014)

Music video
- "Hot Nigga" on YouTube

"Hot Nigga" censored on the album as "Hot N*gga", edited for radio as "Hot Boy" or "Hot Ni-" is the debut single by American rapper Bobby Shmurda. It was released for digital download on July 25, 2014, by Epic Records and GS9 as the lead single from Shmurda's debut EP Shmurda She Wrote. The song includes production from Jahlil Beats, which was originally used by Lloyd Banks for his 2012 song, "Jackpot".

The music video contains a choreography that was later named the "Shmoney dance". The song and the video became popular in 2014 among Vine users, which led to the "Shmoney dance" phenomenon. Additionally, several unofficial remixes by various rappers have been made. "Hot Nigga" was a commercial success, peaking at number 6 on the Billboard Hot 100, becoming Shmurda's first and only top 10 single in the United States, as well as charting internationally in Belgium and the United Kingdom. "Hot Nigga" was certified 5x Platinum by the Recording Industry Association of America (RIAA), and also received Platinum certifications in both New Zealand and the United Kingdom.

== Music video ==
The official music video was uploaded to Shmurda's Vevo account on August 1, 2014. The video was made in the spring of 2014 and was originally uploaded on Maine Fetti's YouTube on March 28, 2014. It was recorded in East Flatbush, Brooklyn. The music video for "Hot Nigga" surpassed 1 billion views on YouTube in July 2026.

== Remixes ==
Freestyles by various rappers have since then been released among which are Juicy J, French Montana, Lil' Kim, Lil Wayne, Gunplay, T.I., Jeezy, Lil Herb, Ace Hood, Shy Glizzy, and Problem.

Two official remixes have been released. On August 29, 2014, Shmurda released a reggae remix, featuring Junior Reid, Mavado, Popcaan and Jah X. Another remix, featuring Fabolous, Jadakiss, Chris Brown, Rowdy Rebel, Busta Rhymes and Yo Gotti was released on September 5, 2014.

== In popular culture ==
Shmurda doing the "Shmoney dance" in the "Hot Nigga" music video

The song and the video became popular in 2014 among Vine users, which led to the "Shmoney dance" meme (such as "Where They At Tho?", "21", and more). One line from the song, "About a week ago!" appeared in the vast majority of these Vines and played a large role in the spread of the song. In July 2014, Beyoncé did the dance move on a venue of her On the Run Tour. The move was also performed by NFL receiver Brandon Gibson after a touchdown.

Drake used the song while hosting the 2014 ESPY Awards.

== Charts ==
=== Weekly charts ===
Chart (2014–2015)	Peak position
Belgium (Ultratip Bubbling Under Flanders)	83
Belgium Urban (Ultratop Flanders)	26
Canada Hot 100 (Billboard)	34
France (SNEP)	131
UK Singles (Official Charts)	74
UK Hip Hop/R&B (Official Charts)	10
US Billboard Hot 100	6
US Hot R&B/Hip-Hop Songs (Billboard)	1
US Rhythmic Airplay (Billboard)	16

=== Year-end charts ===
Chart (2014)	Position
US Billboard Hot 100	54
US Hot R&B/Hip-Hop Songs (Billboard)	14

== Certifications ==
Region	Certification	Certified units/sales
Denmark (IFPI Danmark)	Gold	45,000^{‡}
New Zealand (RMNZ)	Platinum	30,000^{‡}
United Kingdom (BPI)	Platinum	600,000^{‡}
United States (RIAA)	5× Platinum	5,000,000^{‡}
^{‡} Sales+streaming figures based on certification alone.

== Release history ==
Region	Date	Format(s)	Label(s)	Ref.
United States	August 5, 2014	Rhythmic contemporary radio	Epic	

== See also ==
- List of number-one R&B/hip-hop songs of 2014 (U.S.)
