= Die Young (Sleepy Hallow song) =

2022 single by Sleepy Hallow featuring 347aidan

Single by Sleepy Hallow featuring 347aidan

from the album Boy Meets World
- Released: May 25, 2022
- Genre: Trap
- Length: 2:28
- Label: Winners Circle; RCA
- Songwriters: Tegan Chambers; Aidan Fuller; Johnathan Scott
- Producer: Great John

Sleepy Hallow singles chronology
"No Love" (2022)	"Die Young" (2022)

347aidan singles chronology
"Bad Kids" (2022)	"Die Young" (2022)

Music video
- "Die Young" on YouTube

"Die Young" is a song by American rapper Sleepy Hallow, released on May 25, 2022, as the lead single from his second studio album Boy Meets World (2023). It features Canadian rapper 347aidan and was produced by Great John.

== Composition ==
The song samples vocals from 347aidan's song "Memories", while a guitar line over trap drums is played in the instrumental. Lyrically, Sleepy Hallow raps about not wanting to die young and his internal fears of it.

== Music video ==
The music video, directed by Picture Perfect, executive produced by James "Aggie" Barrett, was released on May 25, 2022. It features animated visuals involving Sleepy Hallow and 347aidan, coupled with somber live action scenes.

== Charts ==
Chart performance for "Die Young"
Chart (2022)	Peak position
Australia (ARIA)	38
Canada (Canadian Hot 100)	15
Global 200 (Billboard)	83
New Zealand Hot Singles (RMNZ)	5
Swedish Heatseekers (Sverigetopplistan)	17
UK Singles (OCC)	45
US Billboard Hot 100	60
US Hot R&B/Hip-Hop Songs (Billboard)	15
US Rhythmic (Billboard)	40

== Certifications ==
Certifications for "Die Young"
Region	Certification	Certified units/sales
Canada (Music Canada)	Platinum	80,000^{‡}
New Zealand (RMNZ)	Gold	15,000^{‡}
United Kingdom (BPI)	Silver	200,000^{‡}
United States (RIAA)	Platinum	1,000,000^{‡}
^{‡} Sales+streaming figures based on certification alone.
