= GS9 =

American hip-hop group

- Origin: New York City, U.S.
- Genres: Hip hop
- Years active: 2012–present
- Members: Bobby Shmurda; Rowdy Rebel; Fetty Luciano; Corey Finesse; OnPointLikeOP; Abillyon; Wayveeporter; Lil Skrap1090

GS9 is an American hip hop collective and a street gang based in New York City, United States. Its current members include Bobby Shmurda, Rowdy Rebel, Fetty Luciano, Corey Finesse, Abillyon, Wayveeporter, and Lil Skrap1090.

== Background ==
Rowdy Rebel grew up in a neighbourhood known as "the 90s" in Brooklyn's East Flatbush area. People in his neighborhood referred to him as "rowdy" as a child, which is the genesis for his stage name. Many members of GS9 (including Shmurda) originated in the same East Flatbush locale. He is of Jamaican and Bajan descent.

Much of Rowdy Rebel's music contains references to the block where he grew up. Rowdy has noted that he and other GS9 members talk about friends from the neighborhood "to keep their names alive." Despite the fact that only he and Bobby Shmurda have been signed to Epic Records, one of their primary goals is to help other GS9 members such as Abillyon and Corey Finesse get record contracts too.

Bobby Shmurda had run-ins with the law while living in Brooklyn, including fifteen months spent in detention for probation violation and being arrested on gun charges that were later dropped. According to his 2014 indictment, Shmurda was the ringleader of a criminal enterprise called "GS9" that regularly entered into disputes with criminal gangs, was responsible for murders and non-fatal shootings, and engaged in drug trafficking along Kings Highway to East Flatbush. All members appeared in Shmurda's video for "Hot Nigga"

On June 3, 2014, Shmurda was arrested and charged with felony criminal possession of a weapon. Police claim they saw him flashing the firearm in an apartment and when they went to investigate, he tried to hide it in a couch. He was set free on $10,000 bail. On December 17, 2014, police arrested Shmurda, charging him with conspiracy to commit murder, reckless endangerment, and drug and gun possession; charges against the others included murder, attempted murder, assault, and drug dealing. Shmurda pleaded not guilty and was held on $2 million bail.

== Record label ==
GS9 also release music under GS9 Records. The label is independent and was founded in 2012, however when Shmurda and Rowdy Rebel signed with Epic Records in 2014. Epic went on to distribute for GS9 up until the beginning of 2022 when GS9 ended their distribution partnership with Epic, in favor of self-distributing without the help of Epic or any other record label. GS9’s first release after leaving Epic was Shmurda’s single “They Don’t Know”. The one exclusion is Rebel, as he now has a full deal with Epic Records and Sony Music Entertainment. However, Shmurda parted ways with Epic in March 2022. Shmurda’s last official release under Epic was his song “Shmoney” featuring Quavo and Rebel.

== Discography ==
=== Mixtapes ===
List of mixtapes, with year released
Title	Mixtape details
Shmoney Shmurda	Released: July 8, 2014; Label: GS9; Format: Digital download
Shmurdaville	Released: October 14, 2014; Label: GS9; Format: Digital download
