= Bebe (6ix9ine song) =

2018 single by 6ix9ine featuring Anuel AA

Single by 6ix9ine featuring Anuel AA

from the album Dummy Boy
- Language: Spanish
- Released: August 31, 2018
- Genre: Dancehall
- Length: 3:37
- Label: ScumGang; TenThousand Projects
- Songwriters: Daniel Hernandez; Emmanuel Gazmey Santiago; Ronald Spence Jr.
- Producer: Ronny J

Tekashi 6ix9ine singles chronology
"Fefe" (2018)	"Bebe" (2018)	"Stoopid" (2018)

Anuel AA singles chronology
"Amanece" (2018)	"Bebe" (2018)	"Asesina (Remix)" (2018)

Music video
- "Bebe" on YouTube

"Bebe" (stylized in all caps) is a single by American rapper 6ix9ine featuring Puerto Rican rapper Anuel AA. It was released on August 31, 2018, through TenThousand Projects.

== Production ==
"Bebe" has a tempo of 102 beats per minute. It marks the first time 6ix9ine, whose mother is Mexican and father is Puerto Rican, releases a song in Spanish.

== Music video ==
The song's accompanying music video was released on August 31, 2018. The music video was filmed in Miami Beach and Four Seasons Hotel Miami. In the video, the flags of Mexico and Puerto Rico can be seen, referencing 6ix9ine and Anuel AA's nationalities.

== Charts ==
=== Weekly charts ===
Chart (2018)	Peak position
Argentina (Argentina Hot 100)	9
Austria (Ö3 Austria Top 40)	75
Belgium (Ultratip Bubbling Under Flanders)	35
Colombia (Monitor Latino)	10
Colombia (National-Report)	5
Canada (Canadian Hot 100)	25
France (SNEP)	73
Germany (GfK)	77
Ireland (IRMA)	81
Italy (FIMI)	68
Mexico Espanol Airplay (Billboard)	24
New Zealand Hot Singles (RMNZ)	17
Portugal (AFP)	30
Spain (PROMUSICAE)	1
Sweden (Sverigetopplistan)	62
Switzerland (Schweizer Hitparade)	15
UK Singles (OCC)	67
US Billboard Hot 100	30
US Hot Latin Songs (Billboard)	1
US Latin Airplay (Billboard)	44
US Latin Rhythm Airplay (Billboard)	25

=== Year-end charts ===
Chart (2018)	Position
Spain (PROMUSICAE)	48
US Hot Latin Songs (Billboard)	26
Chart (2019)	Position
US Hot Latin Songs (Billboard)	38

== Certifications ==
Region	Certification	Certified units/sales
France (SNEP)	Gold	100,000^{‡}
Italy (FIMI)	Gold	25,000^{‡}
Mexico (AMPROFON)	Platinum	60,000^{‡}
Spain (PROMUSICAE)	3× Platinum	180,000^{‡}
United States (RIAA)	Platinum	1,000,000^{‡}
^{‡} Sales+streaming figures based on certification alone.
