= Rowdy Rebel =

American rapper from New York (born 1991)

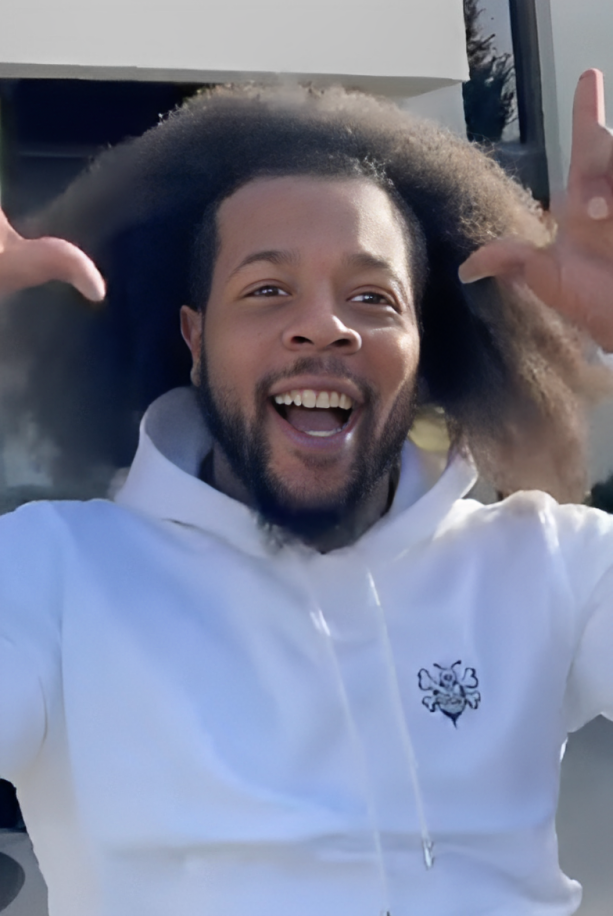
- Rowdy Rebel in 2020

Background information
- Born: Chad Marshall; November 24, 1991 (age 34); New York City, U.S.
- Genres: Hip hop; trap; gangsta rap; Brooklyn drill
- Occupation: Rapper
- Years active: 2014–present
- Labels: GS9; Epic; Geffen
- Website: rebelrowdy.com

Chad Marshall (born November 24, 1991), known professionally as Rowdy Rebel, is an American rapper. He is a member of the Brooklyn-based GS9 collective, formed by hometown rapper Bobby Shmurda. He is best known for his guest appearance on Pop Smoke's 2020 single, "Make It Rain", which entered the top 50 of the Billboard Hot 100.

== Early life ==
Marshall grew up in a neighborhood known as "the 90s" in Brooklyn's East Flatbush area. People in his neighborhood referred to him as "rowdy" as a child, which is the genesis for his stage name. Many members of GS9 (including Shmurda) originated in the same East Flatbush locale. He is of Barbadian descent.

== Career ==
Marshall achieved fame in 2014 with the rise of his GS9 cohort, Bobby Shmurda. He was signed to Epic Records in July 2014 just two weeks after Shmurda signed his deal with Epic. Marshall was featured on a remix of Shmurda's hit single "Hot Nigga" alongside like Fabolous, Jadakiss, Chris Brown, Busta Rhymes, and Yo Gotti. Marshall also released several singles, including "Computers" which was featured on GS9's Shmoney Shmurda (Shmixtape). In October 2014, he released a single entitled "Beam Jawn" which did not include any features from the GS9 crew or other artists.

In June 2020, he was featured on the single "Make It Rain" by the late rapper Pop Smoke, marking his first music release in three years. The track debuted at number 51 on the Billboard Hot 100, marking Marshall's first charting single.

Following his release from prison in December 2020, Rowdy was interviewed by Complex and revealed that he was planning on releasing music straight away, however his team convinced him to work more on a forthcoming full-length project, possibly titled Rowdy vs. Rebel. He also stated that he is still signed to Epic Records.

On February 12, 2021, Rowdy Rebel released the single "Jesse Owens", featuring Canadian rapper Nav.

Rowdy Rebel has released three major projects since 2021, 'Rebel vs. Rowdy' in 2022, 'Splash Brothers', with Fetty Luciano, in 2023, and, most recently, 'Back Outside'.

In August 2025, Marshall was arrested in Los Angeles for alleged gun law violations.

== Legal issues ==
On December 17, 2014, Marshall was arrested by the NYPD for conspiracy, attempted murder, attempted assault, reckless endangerment and criminal possession of a weapon. Bobby Shmurda and 13 others associated with GS9 were also arrested for various charges including drug dealing. Marshall pleaded not guilty to all charges. He pleaded guilty in exchange for a deal that sentenced him to 6–7 years in prison. Due to time served awaiting his trial, Marshall was given almost two years credit for time served. Rebel had a parole hearing scheduled for August 2020, which approved his release in December 2020. Marshall was released from prison after serving 6 years on December 15, 2020. To celebrate his release, fellow rapper Young Thug gave him a YSL chain.

== Artistry ==
Much of Marshall's music contains references to the block where he grew up. Rowdy has noted that he and other GS9 members talk about friends from the neighborhood "to keep their names alive."

== Discography ==
=== Studio albums ===
Title	Album details	Peak chart positions
Title	Album details	US Heat.
Rebel vs. Rowdy	Released: July 15, 2022; Label: Epic; Format: LP, digital download, streaming	6

=== Mixtapes ===
List of mixtapes, with year released
Title	Mixtape details
Shmoney Shmurda (with GS9)	Released: July 8, 2014; Label: GS9; Format: Digital download, streaming
Remain Silent	Released: August 7, 2015; Label: GS9; Format: Digital download, streaming
Shmoney Keeps Calling	Released: January 1, 2016; Label: GS9; Format: Digital download, streaming

=== Singles ===
==== As lead artist ====
Title	Year	Certifications	Album
"Beam Jawn"	2014		Shmoney Keeps Calling
"Computers" (featuring Bobby Shmurda)	2014	RIAA: Gold	Shmoney Shmurda
"She All About That Shmoney" (featuring Bobby Shmurda and Too Short)	2015		Shmoney Keeps Calling
"Figi Shots" (featuring Lil Durk)	2016		Non-album single
"Re Route" (with Funkmaster Flex)	2021		TBA
"Jesse Owens" (featuring Nav)	2021		TBA
"9 Bridge" (with A Boogie wit da Hoodie)	2021		TBA
"—" denotes a recording that did not chart or was not released in that territory.

==== As featured artist ====
Title	Year	Peak chart positions							Album
Title	Year	US	US R&B/HH	CAN	IRE	NZ Hot	SWI	UK	Album
"#FREEDA9" (Don Q featuring Rowdy Rebel)	2017	—	—	—	—	—	—	—	Corner Stories
"Make It Rain" (Pop Smoke featuring Rowdy Rebel)	2020	49	21	35	86	11	84	73	Shoot for the Stars, Aim for the Moon
"Whoopty NYC" (CJ featuring French Montana and Rowdy Rebel)	2021	—	—	—	—	—	—	—	Loyalty Over Royalty
"Shmoney" (Bobby Shmurda featuring Quavo and Rowdy Rebel)	2021	—	—	—	—	—	—	—	TBA

=== Other charted songs ===
List of songs, with selected chart positions, showing year released and album name
Title	Year	Peak chart positions			Album
Title	Year	US	US R&B/HH	CAN	Album
"Came and Saw" (YSL Records and Young Thug featuring Rowdy Rebel)	2021	66	29	76	Slime Language 2
