= List of number-one hits of 2018 (Denmark) =

Tracklisten is a chart that ranks the best-performing singles and tracks in Denmark. Its data, published by IFPI Denmark and compiled by Nielsen Music Control, is based collectively on each single's weekly digital sales.

== Chart history ==
Week	Issue date	Song	Artist(s)	Ref.
52/2017	3 January	"Perfect"	Ed Sheeran	
1	10 January	"Perfect"	Ed Sheeran	
2	17 January	"Langsom"	Gilli	
3	24 January	"Langsom"	Gilli	
4	31 January	"Langsom"	Gilli	
5	7 February	"Perfect"	Ed Sheeran	
6	14 February	"Perfect"	Ed Sheeran	
7	21 February	"Perfect"	Ed Sheeran	
8	28 February	"Tranquillo"	Gilli featuring Branco	
9	7 March	"God's Plan"	Drake	
10	14 March	"God's Plan"	Drake	
11	21 March	"Sydpå"	Bro	
12	28 March	"Sydpå"	Bro	
13	4 April	"Sydpå"	Bro	
14	11 April	"Sydpå"	Bro	
15	18 April	"Sydpå"	Bro	
16	25 April	"Sydpå"	Bro	
17	2 May	"Sydpå"	Bro	
18	9 May	"Holder fast"	Hennedub featuring Gilli and Lukas Graham	
19	16 May	"Kom over"	KESI	
20	23 May	"Kom over"	KESI	
21	30 May	"Kom over"	KESI	
22	6 June	"Kom over"	KESI	
23	13 June	"Oui"	Sivas, Node and Gilli	
24	20 June	"Oui"	Sivas, Node and Gilli	
25	27 June	"Oui"	Sivas, Node and Gilli	
26	4 July	"Oui"	Sivas, Node and Gilli	
27	11 July	"Oui"	Sivas, Node and Gilli	
28	18 July	"Oui"	Sivas, Node and Gilli	
29	25 July	"In My Feelings"	Drake	
30	1 August	"In My Feelings"	Drake	
31	8 August	"In My Feelings"	Drake	
32	15 August	"No Brainer"	DJ Khaled featuring Justin Bieber, Chance the Rapper and Quavo	
33	22 August	"Su casa"	KESI featuring Gilli	
34	29 August	"Su casa"	KESI featuring Gilli	
35	5 September	"Su casa"	KESI featuring Gilli	
36	12 September	"Su casa"	KESI featuring Gilli	
37	19 September	"Love Someone"	Lukas Graham	
38	26 September	"Love Someone"	Lukas Graham	
39	3 October	"Love Someone"	Lukas Graham	
40	10 October	"Love Someone"	Lukas Graham	
41	17 October	"Love Someone"	Lukas Graham	
42	24 October	"Love Someone"	Lukas Graham	
43	31 October	"Love Someone"	Lukas Graham	
44	7 November	"Love Someone"	Lukas Graham	
45	14 November	"Love Someone"	Lukas Graham	
46	21 November	"Sweet but Psycho"	Ava Max	
47	28 November	"Sweet but Psycho"	Ava Max	
48	5 December	"Sweet but Psycho"	Ava Max	
49	12 December	"All I Want for Christmas Is You"	Mariah Carey	
50	19 December	"Last Christmas"	Wham!	
51	26 December	"Last Christmas"	Wham!	
52	2 January 2019	"Last Christmas"	Wham!	
