= Punani (song) =

2020 single by 6ix9ine

Single by 6ix9ine

from the album TattleTales
- Released: August 2, 2020
- Genre: Bounce
- Length: 1:55
- Label: Scumgang; Create; 10K Projects
- Songwriters: Daniel Hernandez; Craig Parks; Jahnei Clarke; Jasper Harris
- Producers: Clarke; Harris

6ix9ine singles chronology
"Yaya" (2020)	"Punani" (2020)	"Zaza" (2021)

Music video
- "Punani" on YouTube

"Punani" (often censored as "P****i") is a song by American rapper 6ix9ine. It was released on August 2, 2020, alongside a music video, as the fourth single from his second studio album, TattleTales, released on September 4, 2020. The song was written by 6ix9ine, Andrew Green, Craig Parks, Jahnei Clarke and Jasper Harris and produced by the latter two.

The song is his first single ever to miss the Billboard Hot 100, only managing to reach number seven on the Bubbling Under Hot 100.

== Release ==
On August 2, 2020, the track briefly appeared online in its entirety after it was accidentally posted on 6ix9ine's website before it was taken down a few minutes later. However, his team decided to release the official track later the same day, in attempts to stop leaks from hitting social media.

== Music video ==
Unlike "Gooba", "Trollz", and "Yaya", the video for "Punani" was filmed outdoors in New York City following 6ix9ine's release from house arrest.

== Personnel ==
- 6ix9ine – vocals, songwriting
- Craig Parks – songwriting
- Jahnei Clarke – songwriting, arrangement, production
- Jasper Harris – songwriting, arrangement, production
- Wizard Lee – mixing, mastering
- Alex Solis – art direction, design

== Charts ==
Chart performance for "Punani"
Chart (2020)	Peak position
Czech Republic Singles Digital (ČNS IFPI)	40
Hungary (Single Top 40)	10
Hungary (Stream Top 40)	30
Switzerland (Schweizer Hitparade)	84
US Bubbling Under Hot 100 (Billboard)	7
US Digital Song Sales (Billboard)	34

== Release history ==
Release history for "Punani"
Region	Date	Format	Label	Ref.
Various	August 2, 2020	Digital download; streaming; 7-inch single; CD single; cassette single	Scumgang; Create; 10K Projects	
