= TattleTales (album) =

Studio album by 6ix9ine
- Released: September 4, 2020
- Recorded: 2020
- Genres: Hip-hop; trap
- Length: 31:25
- Languages: English; Spanish
- Labels: Scumgang; 10K Projects; Create
- Producers: Akon; Dinay; Flamm; Jahnei Clarke; Jasper Harris; Kybba; Limitless; Rahmoon; Ransom Beatz; Rico on the Keys; Roy Lenzo; Sadpony; Sindicate 12; Splititupbenji; The Beat Menace; Tripilz; Tupun

6ix9ine chronology
Dummy Boy (2018)	TattleTales (2020)	Leyenda Viva (2023)

Singles from TattleTales
- 1. "Gooba" Released: May 8, 2020; 2. "Trollz" Released: June 12, 2020; 3. "Yaya" Released: July 3, 2020; 4. "Punani" Released: August 2, 2020; 5. "Tutu" Released: September 4, 2020

TattleTales is the second studio album by American rapper 6ix9ine. It was released on September 4, 2020. TattleTales is the follow-up to Dummy Boy, which was released shortly after 6ix9ine was arrested in November 2018. It features guest appearances from Akon, Nicki Minaj, Smilez, Leftside and DJ Akademiks.

Professional ratings
Review scores
Source	Rating
AllMusic	2/5 stars
NME	2/5 stars

== Background ==
TattleTales is the first album by 6ix9ine since his release from prison following his cooperation with federal agents on a case involving his former fellow gang members of the Nine Trey Bloods. Upon his homecoming from prison, he released his first single of the album, "Gooba", on his birthday on May 8, 2020. His subsequent singles "Trollz", "Yaya" and "Punani" were released afterwards and "Trollz" became a number one hit in the United States.

== Singles ==
"Gooba" was released on May 8, 2020, as the lead single for the album, following his release from prison due to the COVID-19 pandemic and finishing his sentence in house arrest. The single debuted and peaked at number three on the Billboard Hot 100.

The second single, "Trollz" featuring Nicki Minaj, was released a month after "Gooba" on June 12, 2020. The recording debuted atop the Billboard Hot 100, becoming 6ix9ine's first number-one single and Nicki's second, following "Say So" a month earlier. The song would also become the first song to reach number one under an independent label since XXXTentacion's song "Sad!" in 2018. The song later became the first number-one single to fall over 30 positions in its second week after its debut atop the Hot 100 chart.

"Yaya" was released on July 3, 2020, as the third single, where it reached number four on the US Hot Latin Songs Chart and number 99 on the Billboard Hot 100.

The fourth and final single, "Punani" (censored as P****i), was released on August 3, 2020. It peaked at number seven on the Bubbling Under Hot 100 Singles Chart.

== Other songs ==
A music video for the song "Tutu" was released the same day as the album on September 4, 2020, featuring model and reality TV personality Blac Chyna.

== Commercial performance ==
TattleTales debuted at number four on the US Billboard 200 with 53,000 album-equivalent units in its first week, becoming the rapper's third top-10 album. The album sold 32,000 copies in physicals and accumulated a total of 32.94 million on-demand streams of the set's tracks in the week ending September 19.

== Track listing ==
TattleTales track listing
No.	Title	Writer(s)	Producer(s)	Length
1.	"Locked Up Pt. 2" (with Akon)	Daniel Hernandez; Aliaune Akon Thiam	Akon	3:23
2.	"Tutu"	Hernandez; Oswald Jose Rangel Paternina; Tarik Johnston	Dinay; Sindicate 12	2:44
3.	"Gooba"	Hernandez; Jahnei Clarke; Harald Hjermann Srobo	J. Clarke; Payday	2:12
4.	"Wait"	Hernandez; Aaron Clarke; Brandon Benjamin; Eric Upchurch; J. Clarke	Tripilz; J. Clarke; Splititupbenji	1:49
5.	"Charlie" (featuring Smilez)	Hernandez; J. Clarke; Bruno Jack Mascolo; Jasper Harris	J. Clarke; Harris	2:01
6.	"Trollz" (with Nicki Minaj)	Hernandez; Onika Maraj; Jeremiah Raisen; A. Clarke	Sadpony; J. Clarke	3:22
7.	"Nini" (featuring Leftside)	Hernandez; Craig Parks; Efthymois Koukoravas; Francesco de Nigris	Kybba; Limitess	2:17
8.	"Punani"	Hernandez; Craig Parks; J. Clarke; Harris	J. Clarke; Harris	1:55
9.	"Yaya"	Hernandez; Anas Rahmoune; Edgar W. Semper; John Iyinbor; Kedin Maysonet; Luian Malave; Pablo C. Fuentes; Xavier A. Semper	Rahmoon; Ransom Beatz	2:29
10.	"Leah" (with Akon)	Hernandez; Thiam; Anthony Flammia; J. Clarke; Rosario Lenzo	Flamm; J. Clarke; Roy Lenzo	2:57
11.	"Gata" (featuring Lil AK)	Hernandez; Livingston Allen; Omar Gomez; Micah Williams	Beatmenace	1:52
12.	"GTL"	Hernandez; Thiam; Benjamin; J. Clarke	J. Clarke; Splititupbenji	2:20
13.	"Ava"	Hernandez; Ronald Oneil Spence, Jr.	Tupun; Ronny J; RicoOnTheKeys	2:04
Total length:				31:25

Extended edition bonus tracks
No.	Title	Writer(s)	Producer(s)	Length
14.	"R.E.D." (with Sleiman)	Hernandez; Sleiman Nejim; Tobias Samuel Hørup; Sebastian Igens; Jesper Helles; Andrew Green	Tobias Samuel Hørup; Mike Lowrey; Sebastian Igens; J-Doe	1:41
15.	"Trollz" (alternate edition; with Nicki Minaj)	Hernandez; Maraj; Raisen; Clarke	Sadpony; J. Clarke	3:05
Total length:				35:11

Notes

- "Locked Up Pt. 2" contains samples of "Locked Up", written and performed by Akon.

== Charts ==
Chart performance for TattleTales
Chart (2020)	Peak position
Australian Albums (ARIA)	39
Austrian Albums (Ö3 Austria)	14
Belgian Albums (Ultratop Flanders)	25
Belgian Albums (Ultratop Wallonia)	32
Canadian Albums (Billboard)	5
Czech Albums (ČNS IFPI)	5
Danish Albums (Hitlisten)	30
Dutch Albums (Album Top 100)	31
Finnish Albums (Suomen virallinen lista)	15
French Albums (SNEP)	43
German Albums (Offizielle Top 100)	39
Irish Albums (Official Charts)	23
New Zealand Albums (RMNZ)	33
Norwegian Albums (VG-lista)	9
Slovak Albums (ČNS IFPI)	1
Swedish Albums (Sverigetopplistan)	24
Swiss Albums (Schweizer Hitparade)	17
UK Albums (Official Charts)	27
US Billboard 200	4
US Independent Albums (Billboard)	1
US Top R&B/Hip-Hop Albums (Billboard)	4
