= Molotov Movement =

Danish hip hop and rap collective

Molotov Movement (Molo)
- Origin: Denmark
- Genres: Hip-hop
- Years active: 2014–2018
- Labels: Grounded / Sony Music
- Members: Gilli; Benny Jamz; MellemFingaMuzik (made up of Stepz & Branco)

Molotov Movement, abbreviated sometimes as Molo, was a Danish hip hop group that started in 2014. It consists of Danish rappers Gilli, Benny Jamz and duo MellemFingaMuzik (made up of Stepz & Branco). They have all previously collaborated in many joint projects and releases. On 16 June 2018, Molo released an EP, M.O.L.O.. Many of their releases have charted on Hitlisten, the Danish Singles Chart.

== Discography ==
=== EP ===
- 2018: M.O.L.O.

=== Singles and Charted Songs ===
As Molo

Year	Title	Peak positions	Certification	Album
Year	Title	DEN	Certification	Album
2017	"Dedikeret"	3		
2018	"Fryse"	24		Molo
2018	"Udsigt"	29		Molo

as Molo feat. Benny Jamz, Gilli & MellemFingaMuzik

Year	Title	Peak positions	Certification	Album
Year	Title	DEN	Certification	Album
2016	"Udenfor"	30		Non-album release
2016	"Nu"	37		Non-album release
2017	"Bølgen"	5		Non-album release
2017	"Skejsen"	11		Non-album release
2017	"Stilen lagt"	4		Non-album release
2018	"Liv$til"	2		Non-album release
2018	"Safari"	5		Non-album release
