= Benny Jamz =

Danish rapper (born 1993)

Benny Jamz (Höjer Øye)
- Born: Benjamin Jacob Small Heyn-Johnsen; 22 August 1993 (age 33); Denmark
- Genre: Hip-hop
- Occupations: Rapper, record producer, songwriter
- Instrument: Vocals
- Years active: 2015–present
- Formerly of: B.O.C.; Molotov Movement; MellemFingaMuzik

Benjamin Jacob Small Heyn-Johnsen (born 22 August 1993), also known as Benny Jamz or at times Höjer Øye, is a Danish-Jamaican rapper and record producer. He has been a member of the B.O.C. rap group collective and of the Molotov Movement (also known as Molo or M.O.L.O.). He is of mixed origin with a Danish father and a Jamaican mother.

Benny Jamz started initially rapping in English. But when he heard other Danish rappers rapping in Danish, he joined in. In 2014, he released the album Brænd System (meaning burn system) with collaboration such as tracks "Brænd System featuring Gilli or "Dumme" (meaning stupid). His album was heavily influenced by politics and social criticism. He also released an album under the pseudonym Höjer Øye (meaning high eyes), an expression he uses in Danish while rapping.

In January 2020 he released his album 1010 which topped Hitlisten Albums Chart for 2 weeks.

Jamz also appeared in the 2014 film Flow by the Iraqi director Fenar Ahmad.

== Discography ==
=== Albums ===
Title	Details	Peak chart positions	Certification
Title	Details	DEN	Certification
Brænd System	Released: 2014; Label: Formats: Digital download, streaming; Credited as: Højer Øye	–	
1010	Released: January 2020; Label: MXIII / Disco:wax / Sony Music; Formats: Digital download, streaming	1	IFPI DEN: 2× Platinum
Mere End Musik (with Gilli and KESI featuring B.O.C)	Released: 18 June 2021; Label: MXIII / Disco:wax / Sony Music; Formats: Digital download, streaming	1	IFPI DEN: 4× Platinum
Jamo	Released: 15 July 2022; Label: MXIII / Universal; Formats: Digital download, streaming	1	IFPI DEN: 2× Platinum
Ny sejr	Released: 5 May 2023; Label: MXIII / Universal; Formats: Digital download, streaming	1	IFPI DEN: 2× Platinum
Kenny (with Gilli)	Released: 21 June 2024; Label: MXIII / Universal; Formats: Digital download, streaming	1	IFPI DEN: 4× Platinum
Calirose	Released: 24 September 2025; Label: MXIII / Universal; Formats: Digital download, streaming	1	IFPI DEN: Platinum

=== Singles ===
Year	Title	Peak positions	Certification	Album
Year	Title	DEN	Certification	Album
2015	"Brænd System" (credited as Højer Øye)	–		Brænd System (album by Højer Øye)
2015	"Dumme" (credited as Højer Øye)	–		Brænd System (album by Højer Øye)
2017	"Allesammen alene" (featuring Gilli)	25	* IFPI DEN: Gold	Non-album singles
2019	"Spark"	26	* IFPI DEN: Gold	Non-album singles
2019	"Tjep" (featuring Kesi)	10	* IFPI DEN: Gold	Non-album singles
2019	"Uuh" (featuring Branco & Kesi)	10	* IFPI DEN: Platinum	Non-album singles
2019	"Savannah" (featuring Sivas)	14	* IFPI DEN: Gold	Non-album singles
2019	"Domino"	14	* IFPI DEN: Gold	Non-album singles
2019	"Balou"	5	* IFPI DEN: Platinum	1010
2019	"Flytilstand"	14	* IFPI DEN: Gold	1010
2020	"Sektion" (featuring Branco & Gilli)	6	* IFPI DEN: Gold	1010
2020	"Gelato"	32	* IFPI DEN: Gold	Non-album singles
2020	"Cardi B"	23		Non-album singles
2021	"Wawa" (with Gilli and Kesi featuring B.O.C)	3	* IFPI DEN: Platinum	Non-album singles
2021	"B.O. Bop" (with Gilli and Kesi featuring B.O.C)	27		Non-album singles
2021	"No Love" (with Gilli and Kesi featuring B.O.C)	3	* IFPI DEN: Gold	Non-album singles
2021	"Hajde" (with Gilli and Kesi featuring B.O.C)	3	* IFPI DEN: Platinum	Mere End Musik
2022	"Europa Life" (with Gilli)	9	* IFPI DEN: Gold	Non-album single
2022	"Vi varme"	7	* IFPI DEN: 2× Platinum	Jamo
2022	"Elo Elo" (with Gilli and KESI featuring B.O.C)	2	* IFPI DEN: Platinum	Non-album singles
2023	"Betalt" (with Tessa and Lamin)	19		Non-album singles
2023	"Noget med noget"	28		Ny sejr
2023	"Under Radar" (with Gilli and Kesi featuring B.O.C.)	7	* IFPI DEN: 2× Platinum	Non-album singles
2024	"Ousside" (with Noah Carter)	3	* IFPI DEN: Gold	Non-album singles
2025	"Pilot"	10		Non-album singles
2025	"Bipolar" (with Gilli, Kesi and Lamin featuring B.O.C)	7	* IFPI DEN: Platinum	Non-album singles
2025	"Woodstock"	12	* IFPI DEN: Gold	Calirose

=== Featured in ===
Year	Title	Peak positions	Certification	Album
Year	Title	DEN	Certification	Album
2016	"Udenfor" (Molo feat. Benny Jamz, Gilli & MellemFingaMuzik)	30	* IFPI DEN: Gold	
2016	"Nu" (Molo feat. Benny Jamz, Gilli & MellemFingaMuzik)	37	* IFPI DEN: Platinum	
2017	"Bølgen" (Molo feat. Benny Jamz, Gilli & MellemFingaMuzik)	5	* IFPI DEN: 2× Platinum	
2017	"Skejsen" (Molo feat. Benny Jamz, Gilli & MellemFingaMuzik)	11	* IFPI DEN: 3× Platinum	
2017	"Mamacita" (Kesi feat. Benny Jamz)	4	* IFPI DEN: 4× Platinum	
2017	"Op" (Kesi feat. Gilli & Benny Jamz)	5	* IFPI DEN: 2× Platinum	
2017	"Jackpot" (MellemFingaMuzik feat. Benny Jamz)	2	* IFPI DEN: Gold	
2017	"Stilen lagt" (Molo feat. Benny Jamz, Gilli & MellemFingaMuzik)	4	* IFPI DEN: Platinum	
2018	"Tilfældigt" (Basim feat. Benny Jamz)	7	* IFPI DEN: Platinum	
2018	"Liv$til" (Molo feat. Benny Jamz, Gilli & MellemFingaMuzik)	2	* IFPI DEN: Platinum	
2018	"Safari" (Molo feat. Benny Jamz, Gilli & MellemFingaMuzik)	5	* IFPI DEN: Platinum	
2019	"Fortuna" (Sivas feat. Branco & Benny Jamz)	31		
2019	"Investere" (Branco feat. Stepz, Gilli & Benny Jamz)	18		
2019	"Traficanté" (Branco feat. Gilli & Benny Jamz)	29	* IFPI DEN: Gold	
2019	"100" (Gilli feat. Benny Jamz, Branco & Kesi)	25	* IFPI DEN: Gold	
2019	"Principperne" (Gilli feat. Benny Jamz)	29	* IFPI DEN: Gold	
2019	"Selv" (Gilli feat. Benny Jamz & Branco)	32		
2019	"Ik sådan der" (KESI feat. Benny Jamz)	21		
2019	"Gimma min del" (Stepz feat. Benny Jamz)	40		
2019	"Endnu" (Stepz feat. Gilli, Benny Jamz & Branco)	3	* IFPI DEN: Platinum	
2019	"Fra gaden" (A'typisk feat. Benny Jamz)	32		
2024	"SkyLL" (Lamin feat. Benny Jamz)	2	* IFPI DEN: 2× Platinum	
2024	"2 Stepper Freestyle" (Anton Westerlin feat. Benny Jamz)	6	* IFPI DEN: Gold	
2026	"1000 Øjne" (Thor Farlov feat. Benny Jamz)	33		

=== Other charted songs ===
Year	Title	Peak positions	Album
Year	Title	DEN	Album
2020	"Shopping" (feat. Kesi and Stepz)	38	
2022	"Benzema" (featuring Gilli)	18	Jamo
2022	"Maskot" (featuring Kesi)	36	Jamo
2023	"Palermo" (with Kesi)	18	Ny sejr
2023	"Tudo bem" (with Gilli)	2	Ny sejr
2023	"Young Habibi" (with Lamin)	38	Ny sejr
2025	"Caribiske kyster"	26	Calirose
2025	"Blod & tårer"	27	Calirose
2025	"Poptard" (featuring Noah Carter)	31	Calirose
2025	"Es go"	17	Calirose
2025	"10 dage" (featuring Lamin)	9	Calirose
2025	"Topspiller" (featuring Mas)	39	Calirose
