= Yaya (song) =

2020 single by 6ix9ine

Single by 6ix9ine

from the album TattleTales
- Language: Spanish
- Released: July 3, 2020
- Genre: Hip hop; reggaeton
- Length: 2:29
- Label: Scumgang; Create; 10K Projects
- Songwriters: Daniel Hernandez; Emmanuel Gazmey; Anas Rahmoune; Edgar Semper; John Iyinbor; Kedin Maysonet; Luian Malave; Pablo Fuentes; Xavier Semper
- Producers: Ramoon; Ransom Beatz

6ix9ine singles chronology
"Trollz" (2020)	"Yaya" (2020)	"Punani" (2020)

Music video
- "Yaya" on YouTube

"Yaya" (stylized in all caps) is a song by American rapper 6ix9ine. It was released on July 3, 2020, alongside a music video, as the third single from his second studio album, TattleTales, released on September 4, 2020. The song was written by 6ix9ine, Anuel AA, Edgar Semper, Kedin Maysonet, Luian Malave, Pablo Fuentes, Xavier Semper and producers Ramoon and Ransom Beatz. It interpolates the 2003 song "Baila Morena" by Puerto Rican reggaeton duo Héctor & Tito.

== Background ==
6ix9ine first announced the song and its release date on June 27, 2020, in an Instagram Story. He confirmed the track's title in an Instagram video on June 29, with a bikini-clad woman (who would later appear in the music video) giving him a lap dance and twerking in a studio. He previewed the song with him singing in Spanish and further called it his "best one so far". This marks the third time 6ix9ine, whose mother is Mexican and father is Puerto Rican, released a Spanish song, following the Dummy Boy tracks "Bebe" and "Mala", both of which featured Puerto Rican rapper Anuel AA.

On September 4, 2020, 6ix9ine announced in a Billboard interview that Anuel AA was supposed to be in "Yaya" and they wrote the song together.

== Music video ==
As with "Gooba" and "Trollz", the video for "Yaya" was filmed at 6ix9ine's home, in his living room, while he was under house arrest. The video was released along with the song.

== Commercial performance ==
"Yaya" debuted at number 99 on the Billboard Hot 100, tying with "Gotti" as 6ix9ine's lowest charting single to date. It is a commercial failure in comparison to his previous single "Trollz", which peaked at number one, three weeks prior. The song peaked at number four on the Billboard Hot Latin Songs chart.

In Europe, the song was moderately successful, peaking at number eight in Hungary, number 46 in Switzerland and number 87 in the UK, becoming one of the least successful songs of his career.

== Personnel ==
Credits adapted from Tidal and YouTube.

- 6ix9ine – lead artist, songwriting
- Anas Rahmoune – songwriting, arrangement, production
- Edgar Semper – songwriting
- John Iyinbor – songwriting, arrangement, production
- Anuel AA – songwriting
- Kedin Maysonet – songwriting
- Luian Malave – songwriting
- Pablo Fuentes – songwriting
- Xavier Semper – songwriting
- Wizard Lee – mixing, mastering
- Alex Solis – art direction, design

== Charts ==
Chart (2020)	Peak position
Argentina Hot 100 (Billboard)	48
Austria (Ö3 Austria Top 40)	53
Canada Hot 100 (Billboard)	95
Hungary (Single Top 40)	8
New Zealand Hot Singles (RMNZ)	35
Switzerland (Schweizer Hitparade)	46
UK Singles (Official Charts)	87
US Billboard Hot 100	99
US Hot Latin Songs (Billboard)	4

== Release history ==
Region	Date	Format	Label	Ref.
Various	July 3, 2020	Digital download; streaming; 7-inch single; CD single; cassette single	Scumgang; Create; 10K Projects	
