= Node (singer) =

Danish singer and rapper

- Born: 3 March 1990 (age 36); Aarhus, Denmark
- Origin: Danish of Kurdish descent
- Genres: Singing, Hip hop
- Occupations: Singer, rapper, songwriter
- Instrument: Vocal
- Years active: 2012–present

Rijan Nabaz better known by his stage name Node (born 3 March 1990) is a Danish-Kurdish singer and rapper.

He started in 2012 as a pop singer under the mononym Rijan releasing his song "Ligeglad". Very early on he recorded also the song "Farvel" that featured also the rapper Gilli accompanied with a music video and rap sequence by Gilli. The video enjoyed 500,000 views. He followed it up by "I mit hovede" also credited as Rajin.

He gained fame in 2017 through streaming of materials through Danish artist on Spotify. His music is characterized by a mix of Middle Eastern pop music, dancehall rhythms, rhythm and blues and hip-hop with urban lyrics about urban life. He is signed to Sony Music Denmark.

His breakthrough came when he released the singles "Zebah" and "Pakker Bar" that charted on Hitlisten, the Danish Singles Chart. The follow-up "De Snakker" featuring Stepz of MellemFingaMuzik reached No. 2 on the Danish Singles Chart. He has released Cambiarme in 2018 that topped the Danish Albums Chart, followed by Samme vej that made it to No. 2 on the same chart. Samme vej includes collaborations with Burhan G, Stepz, Post Malone and Rasmus Seebach. Number one hits involve "Oui" as the trio Sivas, Node and Gilli and "Super Mario". He has widely collaborated with Danish rapper Gilli with him he has charted multiple times, like "Zebah" in 2016, "Carnalismo" in 2018 and "Limbo" in 2020. Node was nominated for "Danish Newcomer of the Year" during the Danish Music Awards in 2017.

== Discography ==
=== Albums ===
Title	Details	Peak chart positions
Title	Details	DEN
Cambiarme	Released: 3 March 2018; Label: Sony Music; Formats: Digital download, streaming	1
Samme vej	Released: November 2019; Label: Sony Music; Formats: Digital download, streaming	2
Brancs & Reggie (with Branco)	Released: 16 June 2023; Label: Sony Music; Formats: Digital download, streaming	11

=== Singles ===
Year	Title	Peak positions	Certification	Album
Year	Title	DEN	Certification	Album
2016	"Zebah" (feat. Gilli)	25		
2016	"Pakker bar"	14		
2017	"De Snakker" (feat. Stepz)	2		
2017	"Blæst"	11		
2017	"Al fuego"	8		
2017	"Gi mig det hele"	2		Cambiarme
2017	"Indifferent" (feat. Sivas)	6		Cambiarme
2018	"Carnalismo" (feat. Branco & Gilli)	5		Cambiarme
2018	"Jvb"	6		Cambiarme
2018	"For mig selv" (feat. Gilli)	5		Cambiarme
2018	"Oui" (with Sivas & Gilli)	1		
2019	"Diana"	10		
2019	"Super Mario"	1		Samme vej
2020	"Limbo" (feat. Gilli)	6		
2021	"Lad det gå" (with Larry 44)	10		
2022	"Sjov sommer"	37		

=== Featured in ===
Year	Title	Peak positions	Certification	Album
Year	Title	DEN	Certification	Album
2017	"Lay Lay" (Pay feat. Node)	5		
2017	"De ved godt" (Fouli feat. Node)	10		
2017	"Habibti" (Pretty feat. Node)	28		
2018	"Bang Bang" (ZK feat. Node)	7		
2019	"Ingenting at sige" (Gilli feat. Node)	15		
2020	"Nådig" (Larry 44 feat. Node)	19		

=== Other songs ===
Year	Title	Peak positions	Certification	Album
Year	Title	DEN	Certification	Album
2012	"Ligeglad" (credited as Rajin)	–		
2012	"Farvel" (credited as Rajin feat. Gilli)	–		
2012	"I mit hovede" (credited as Rajin)	–		
2018	"Demawa"	12		Cambiarme
2018	"Diablo"	34		Cambiarme
2018	"Cambiarme" (feat. Stepz)	33		Cambiarme
2018	"Habibi"	37		Cambiarme
2018	"Mariah"	20		
2018	"Opa"	12		
2018	"No Romantico" (feat. Si el bien)	21		
2019	"Skub det ud"	22		
2019	"Vil du"	32		
2019	"Ra ta ta ta" (feat. Stepz)	27		Samme vej
2019	"Mafiosa"	33		Samme vej
2019	"Samme vej"	36		Samme vej
