= Zaza (song) =

2021 single by 6ix9ine

Single by 6ix9ine
- Released: February 19, 2021
- Length: 1:55
- Label: Create Music Group
- Songwriter: Daniel Hernandez
- Producer: Ray Keys

6ix9ine singles chronology
"Punani" (2020)	"Zaza" (2021)	"Giné" (2022)

Music video
- "Zaza" on YouTube

"Zaza" (stylized in all caps) is a song by American rapper 6ix9ine. It was released as a single through Create Music Group on February 19, 2021. The song was written solely by the artist and produced by Ray Keys. It marks 6ix9ine's first release following his second studio album, TattleTales (2020). The title of the song is slang for cannabis. In 2022, the song was removed from streaming services.

== Background ==
On the song, 6ix9ine refers to his altercation with fellow American rapper Meek Mill outside a nightclub in Atlanta, Georgia, which occurred on February 13, 2021. He also takes an aim at rapper Lil Durk, making jokes about the deaths of Durk's cousin Nuski and his friend and fellow rapper and labelmate King Von. 6ix9ine mocks a few lyrics of American rapper Pooh Shiesty's 2020 single "Back in Blood", which also features Lil Durk. In the song, Durk finishes off his verse by saying, "Tell the truth about your gang, bitch, they really dyin'". During his confrontation with Meek Mill, 6ix9ine also used a line from the same song, in which Pooh Shiesty starts off the chorus by saying, "Bitch, I got my own fire, don't need security in the club". On February 20, 2021, one day after the song was released, rapper 600Breezy, a friend of Lil Durk and King Von, who is also from their hometown of Chicago, Illinois, pointed a death threat towards 6ix9ine for taunting the two rappers on Instagram Live.

== Release and promotion ==
After a long social media hiatus for almost five months after releasing his second studio album, TattleTales, 6ix9ine posted a one-minute-long snippet of the song on Instagram on February 4, 2021. On February 18, 2021, he announced the imminent release of the song and its official music video through an Instagram story.

== Music video ==
The official music video for "Zaza" was released along with the song on February 19, 2021. 6ix9ine uses some camera footage of the argument between himself and Meek Mill in the middle of the video. On February 22, 2021, 6ix9ine had revealed that Meek Mill had written a letter to the lawyers of Roc Nation to request the visuals be removed from YouTube, who then obliged. He later released another version of the music video without the Meek Mill footage.

== Charts ==
Chart performance for "Zaza"
Chart (2021)	Peak position
Canada Hot 100 (Billboard)	91
Global 200 (Billboard)	144
Hungary (Single Top 40)	19
New Zealand Hot Singles (RMNZ)	30
US Billboard Hot 100	90
US Hot R&B/Hip-Hop Songs (Billboard)	37
