= United Blood Nation =

African-American street gang

- Founded: July 16, 1993; 33 years ago
- Founder: Leonard McKenzie Omar Portee
- Founding location: Rikers Island, New York City, New York, United States
- Years active: 1993–present
- Territory: Northeastern U.S., Southeastern U.S. and Europe
- Ethnicity: Predominantly African American
- Membership (est.): 7,000-15,000
- Activities: Drug trafficking, prostitution, robbery, extortion and counterfeiting
- Allies: Bloods; Lucchese crime family
- Rivals: Crips

The United Blood Nation, also known as the East Coast Bloods, is a street and prison gang active primarily in the New York metropolitan area. It is the East Coast faction of the California-based Bloods street gang. Their main source of income is the trafficking and sale of illegal drugs.

== History ==
The United Blood Nation was formed on July 16, 1993, when incarcerated gang leader Leonard "OG Dead Eye" McKenzie allied several gangs to protect members from the dominant Hispanic gangs. The UBN was established as the New York branch of the California-based Bloods, to which its members are loosely affiliated, and the gang spread along the East Coast as members were released from prison.

The UBN became the dominant gang on the East Coast during the 1990s, outnumbering the rival Crips. The gang's meteoric rise to the top of the gang hierarchy was halted in 2001, however, when founder Omar Portee was arrested and later convicted of federal Racketeer Influenced and Corrupt Organizations Act (RICO) charges. Portee was sentenced to 50 years imprisonment and is currently incarcerated in the federal supermax ADX Florence prison in Colorado. In the years following Portee's incarceration, the UBN has splintered somewhat, with infighting among the gang's subgroups being reported. The UBN's co-founder and once-prominent member, Leonard McKenzie, has allegedly retired from the gangster lifestyle.

== Organization ==
The structure of the United Blood Nation is hierarchical, with each member being designated a specific rank within the gang, which comes with specific duties and responsibilities. The UBN uses a ranking system often disguised with code names to label the leadership structure. The gang's leadership is based in New York City and the New York prison system. The UBN hierarchy, or chain of command, includes a national council ("the Council") consisting of members selected from the leaders of the gang's subgroups ("sets").

All UBN subgroups are governed by a common set of rules originally written by founders Omar Portee and Leonard McKenzie. There are 31 UBN rules known as "The 31." Examples of the rules are: Individual gang members are to operate and conduct themselves as defined by "The 31"; Procedures for infractions or disciplinary actions; "Snitching," or cooperating with law enforcement, is strictly prohibited. Dues are collected from each member for the benefit of the organization. A portion of the dues is saved and utilized locally, while another portion is sent up the chain to gang leadership.

== Membership ==
Members of the gang are mostly African-American males. Some sets have Asian-, Hispanic- and White-American members. While some sets allow female members, their status varies between sets. To become a member of the United Blood Nation, one must be introduced by an existing gang member or prove to be the most dominant. A potential new member is "beat in" (physically beaten for 31 seconds by gang members, a very minute amount of time compared to most violent gangs) and provided with a copy of the UBN history, oaths, and the 31 rules which must be memorized (these traditions reflect social fraternal clubs and are not typical of most Bloods). This process is referred to as being "brought home", alternatively referred to as "Bumming Home". All gang members are required to "put in work," meaning that they must carry out the orders and activities as directed by gang leadership. Old School gangs didn't provide domestic services or follow regimes mandating blue-collar labor.

In 2017, the head of the United Blood Nation was alleged by federal prosecutors to be Pedro Gutierrez, who allegedly directed the UBN despite being imprisoned in New York State while serving a murder sentence. This fact reflects the prison system's lack of ability to 'control' gang activity even while gang members are in full confinement.

== Symbols ==
United Blood Nation factions are identified by the local telephone area code.

Gang graffiti often includes the letter "C" crossed out, the abbreviation "CK" (for "Crip Killer"), the number "031", the letter "S" crossed out (as "Slobs" is an offensive nickname for Bloods).

Gang tattoos often use three dots representing a dog paw, bulldogs, and "M.O.B." (for "Member of Bloods" or "Money Over Bitches").

== Investigations and prosecutions ==
United Blood Nation founder Omar Portee was among fifteen members and associates of the gang indicted on racketeering charges in New York City on May 8, 2001, following a joint investigation by the Federal Bureau of Investigation (FBI) and New York Police Department (NYPD). Portee was convicted of ten counts of criminal activity, including racketeering, murder, conspiracy, credit card fraud, and drug trafficking on August 27, 2002. On April 14, 2003, he was sentenced to fifty years' imprisonment.

More than sixty people were arrested on charges of racketeering, conspiracy, extortion, money laundering, or drug crimes on July 25, 2006, during a crackdown on the Nine Trey Gangsters (NTG) faction of the UBN in New Jersey. The indictments were the culmination of an eleven-month investigation, called Operation Nine Connect, involving around five hundred law enforcement officers from federal, state, and local agencies.

Fifteen people linked to the UBN in Charlotte, North Carolina were indicted on February 25, 2009, on federal drug conspiracy and other charges arising from their participation in a cocaine, heroin, and marijuana distribution ring. The prosecutions followed a six-month-long investigation by the FBI and Charlotte-Mecklenburg Police Department (CMPD).

Operation Heat, an investigation by the Division of Criminal Justice Gangs & Organized Crime Bureau, uncovered a conspiracy in which the UBN's Nine Trey Gangsters faction entered into an alliance with the Lucchese crime family to smuggle drugs and pre-paid cell phones into East Jersey State Prison, and led to the arrests of thirty-four members and associates of the Lucchese family's Jersey Crew in May 2010. Dwayne Spears, a "five star general" in the NTG, was among those indicted.

Twenty-eight members of the UBN in North Carolina were arrested on May 18, 2012, and charged with racketeering and related charges, including drug trafficking, firearms trafficking, armed robbery, and murder conspiracy. All twenty-eight were convicted on various charges, the last of whom was sentenced in October 2014. The case was investigated by the FBI in cooperation with the Bureau of Alcohol, Tobacco, Firearms, and Explosives (ATF), the North Carolina State Bureau of Investigation and local police departments.

On May 18, 2017, eighty-three members of the Nine Trey Gangsters faction of the UBN were arrested and indicted on federal racketeering conspiracy charges and charges related to murder, attempted murder, violent assault, narcotics distribution, firearms possession, and Hobbs Act robbery. A number were also charged with bank fraud, wire fraud, and aggravated identity theft related to financial crimes. The arrests were made during a series of coordinated raids involving over six-hundred federal, state and local law enforcement officers in North Carolina, South Carolina, Virginia, New York and Florida. Eighty-two people were convicted as a result of the investigation, including Pedro Gutierrez, the "Chairman" of the UBN, who was sentenced to twenty years imprisonment on September 4, 2018.

Over forty people were arrested in Washington, D.C., Maryland, and Virginia on December 6, 2017, as a result of Operation Tin Panda, an investigation by the ATF, FBI, and local agencies into UBN-related crimes in the Washington metropolitan area. Firearms and thousands of grams of heroin, cocaine, methamphetamine, and THC were seized during the operation. Thirty-nine of the defendants were convicted on federal firearms and drug charges. Tarvell Vandiver, the leader of the UBN subdivision Imperial Gangsta Bloods (IGB) in Northern Virginia, was sentenced to twenty years in prison in October 2018.

In 2018, Brooklyn, New York rapper Tekashi 6ix9ine, his manager Kifano "Shotti" Jordan, and 10 other members of the Nine Trey Gangsters faction of the UBN were arrested and charged with racketeering and various felony crimes. 6ix9ine turned state's evidence against the gang and its members, whom he had formed an association with to gain street credibility. 6ix9ine was released in April 2020.

In 2020, 9 members of the Hunt’s Point Family Bloods were arrested for engaging in sex trafficking of a child.

In April 2022, Pierre De Romeo Smith, a member of the Imperial Gangster Bloods, took sexually explicit photos to assist with trafficking a 16-year old victim. He was subsequently found guilty for sex trafficking, production of child pornography, possession with intent to distribute controlled substances, and unlawful possession of a firearm, and was sentenced to 32 years.
