= Giné =

2022 single by 6ix9ine

Single by 6ix9ine
- Released: April 15, 2022
- Recorded: 2021
- Genre: Hardcore Hip hop; Drill
- Length: 2:15
- Label: Giné
- Songwriters: Daniel Hernandez; Linards Andzans; Cesar Peralta
- Producers: Lenzo; De Emperor Cesar

6ix9ine singles chronology
| "Zaza" (2021) | "Giné" (2022) | "Bori" (2023) |

Music video
- "Giné" on YouTube

"Giné" (stylized in all caps) is a song by American rapper 6ix9ine. It was released as a single through Giné Music Group on April 15, 2022. The song was produced by Lenzo and De Emperor Cesar. Wizard Lee mixed and mastered the song. Named after an energy drink, "Giné" serves as 6ix9ine's first release in over a year, following his previous single, "Zaza", which was released on February 19, 2021. The week before the release of the song, 6ix9ine announced that he would be releasing a new single the following week. He also announced a NFT collection named after the song after a reported scam for his NFT collection for his 2020 single with Nicki Minaj, "Trollz", surfaced.

== Composition and lyrics ==
On "Giné", 6ix9ine boasts about his weaponry and calls out the people he thinks are posers. He references his 2018 federal case: "I shot at all y'all rappers / Real life, no cap / The feds charged me for that, whole fuckin' case, so eat a dick, little nigga". He then takes shots at fellow rapper Lil Durk and Durk's late Only the Family artist, King Von, rapping: "Your man got shot, you made a diss track / Go get a gun and get some get back / Your man got shot, he not coming back / Go get a gun and get some get back".

== Music video ==
The official music video for "Giné" premiered alongside the release of the song on April 15, 2022. Filled with color, it includes plenty of women sporting thongs who twerk around 6ix9ine and the background matches the color of his rainbow-colored hair. At the beginning and end of the video, the energy drink of the same name is promoted by showing different flavors of it. Alexander Cole of HotNewHipHop felt that "this product placement has never been beneath 6ix9ine, although it is still a bit jarring to see when you're about to indulge in a new track".

== Charts ==
| Chart (2022) | Peak position |
|---|---|
| Canada Hot 100 (Billboard) | 80 |
| New Zealand Hot Singles (RMNZ) | 23 |
| US Billboard Hot 100 | 83 |
| US Hot R&B/Hip-Hop Songs (Billboard) | 26 |
