= Sivas (rapper) =

Danish rapper

S!vas
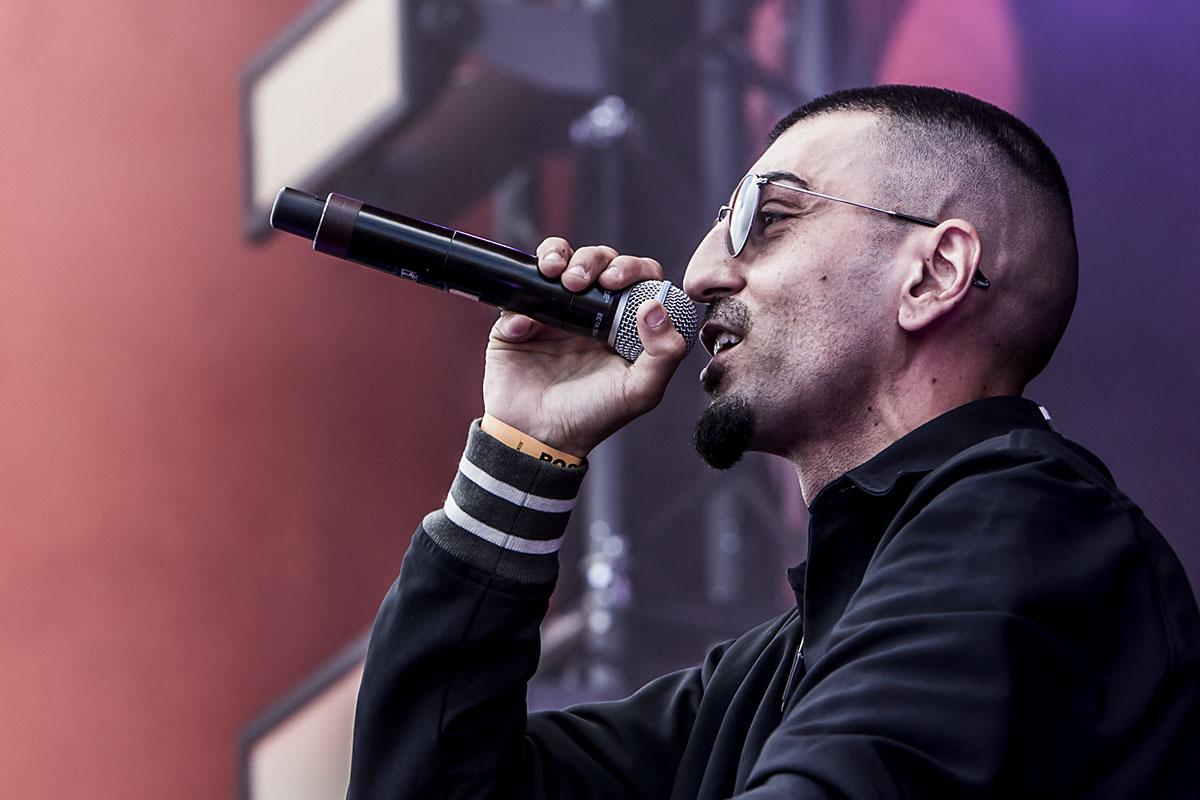
- S!vas at Roskilde Festival (2014)

Background information
- Born: Sivas Torbati
- Genre: Rap
- Years active: 2013–present
- Label: Sony Music

Sivas Torbati (Persian: سیواس تربتی), better known by the mononym Sivas stylized as xx5!V45xx, is a Danish rapper of Iranian origin. He is signed to Sony Music.

He resided in Brøndby Strand famous for a number of rap and hip hop acts in Denmark. He later moved to Smørum near Tingbjerg and finally Copenhagen. His debut EP was d.a.u.d.a. released on Forbandet Ungdom, a sub-label of Disco:wax, and distributed by Sony.

== Discography ==
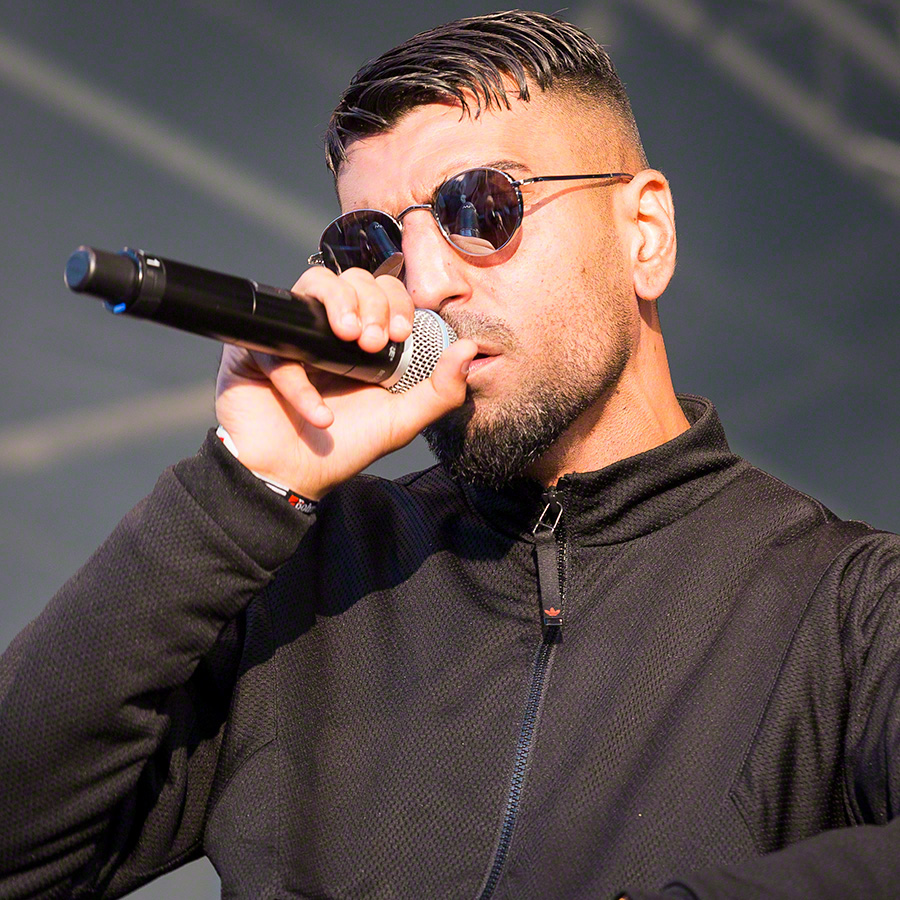
S!vas at Stavernfestivalen in 2016

=== Albums ===
Year	Title	Peak positions
Year	Title	DEN
2016	Familie før para	5
2018	Ultra	1
2019	Contra	1
2022	Forza	2
2025	R du stadig her 4 mig	3

=== EPs ===
Year	Title	Peak positions	Notes
Year	Title	DEN	Notes
2013	d.a.u.d.a. (EP)	30	Track list: 1. "Kbhavana" (3:25); 2. "Markering (Hæld op)" (3:53); 3. "Tonede ruder" (feat. Hans Phillip) (3:15); 4. "d.a.u.d.a" (feat. Gilli) (3:46); 5. "Araba" (3:41)
2014	d.a.u.d.a. II (EP)	14	Track list: 1. "Viva" (feat. Højer Øye) (3:53); 2. "#Holdet" (3:52); 3. "Det gode liv" (3:51); 4. "Diamanter & Kemikalier" (4:40); 5. "Hacket" (feat. Gilli & MellemFingaMuzik) (5:46); 6. "D.a.m.a.i.k.a.m" (feat. L.O.C.) (5:25)

=== Singles ===
Year	Single	Peak positions	Album or EP
Year	Single	DEN	Album or EP
2014	"D.a.u.d.a." (feat. Gilli)	27	d.a.u.d.a.
2014	"Det gode liv"	23	d.a.u.d.a. II
2015	"Jaja"	15	Familie før para
2016	"Kun hinanden" (feat. Gilli)	21	Familie før para
2017	"Vejen"	20	Ultra
2018	"Sidste timer"	3	Ultra
2018	"Colombiana" (feat. Gilli)	4	Ultra
2018	"Sensei" (feat. MellemFingaMuzik)	17	Ultra
2018	"Lang histoire kort"	22	Ultra
2018	"Oui" (with Node and Gilli)	1	non-album single
2019	"4Livet"	5	Contra
2019	"Capitan"	9	Contra
2019	"Rally" (feat. Gilli)	6	Contra
2019	"Stresser af" (feat. Stepz)	16	Contra
2022	"Violence" (featuring Branco)	25	Forza
2022	"Material Girl" (featuring Lord Siva)	39	Forza
2025	"Chvorviridag" (featuring Gilli and Kesi)	30	R du stadig her 4 mig
2025	"Illus.on" (featuring Noah Carter and Thor Farlov)	33	R du stadig her 4 mig

Featured in

Year	Single	Peak positions	Album or EP
Year	Single	DEN	Album or EP
2014	"Stein bagger" (Ukendt Kunstner feat. Sivas)	31	
2016	"Lige nu" (Ukendt Kunstner feat. Sivas)	35	
2017	"Rica" (Gilli feat. KESI & Sivas)	2	
2017	"Trip nok" (Jamaika feat. Sivas)	20	
2017	"Indifferent" (Node feat. Sivas)	6	
2018	"Drama" (ZK feat. Sivas)	7	
2019	"Savannah" (Benny Jamz feat. Sivas)	14	
2019	"Våben" (Branco feat. Sivas & Ctk)	37	
2019	"Fallit" (Isaac Kasule feat. Sivas)	34	
2019	"Samurai" (Stepz feat. Sivas)	16	
2019	"Cara mia" (Stepz feat. Sivas & KESI)	34	
