= Gooba =

2020 single by 6ix9ine

Single by 6ix9ine

from the album TattleTales
- Released: May 8, 2020
- Genre: Trap
- Length: 2:13
- Label: Create; 10K; Scumgang
- Songwriters: Daniel Hernandez; Jahnei Clarke; Harald Sorebo
- Producers: Clarke; Payday

6ix9ine singles chronology
| "Swervin" (2019) | "Gooba" (2020) | "Trollz" (2020) |

Music video
- "Gooba" on YouTube

"Gooba" (stylized in all caps) is a song by American rapper 6ix9ine. It was released on May 8, 2020, 6ix9ine's birthday, as the first single after his prison release on April 2, 2020. It is the lead single from his second studio album, TattleTales, released on September 4, 2020. 6ix9ine recorded the song and filmed its accompanying video while under house arrest. The song sees him rapping about his role in the Nine Trey Gangsters trial, while targeting his detractors.

== Background and promotion ==
On November 18, 2018, Hernandez was arrested on racketeering, weapons, and drugs charges. After pleading guilty to nine charges, such as armed robbery and conspiracy to murder, he was sentenced to 2 years in prison in December 2019. However, he was released earlier in April 2020 due to the COVID-19 pandemic. On May 7, 2020, he announced that he would celebrate his 24th birthday the following day, by releasing a new single.

=== Promotion ===
The song was promoted via a large billboard in Times Square that read "The King Is Back". 6ix9ine also hosted an Instagram Live session on the day of the song's release, which received a record of 2 million simultaneous views.

== Composition and lyrics ==
"Gooba" contains a simplistic trap beat, and finds 6ix9ine employing his signature "aggressive" style. Lyrically, as noted by Rap-Up, he "unleashes his wrath on the haters and clout chasers". In the first verse, 6ix9ine raps "Are you dumb, stupid, or dumb?", rehashing a line from Brooklyn rapper Ronny Godz's song "Are You Dumb", a line which 6ix9ine previously utilized on his 2018 song "Stoopid". He also addresses testifying in court against members of the Nine Trey Bloods Gang in return for a reduced sentence: "Tell me how I ratted, came home to a big bag". The track also includes a reference to the COVID-19 pandemic ("Basic, been hot, way before coronavirus"). Brendan Klinkenberg of Rolling Stone described the song as "punishingly blunt and seemingly designed to provoke".

== Critical reception ==
"Gooba" received negative reviews from most critics. Complex's Shawn Setaro gave the song a negative review, and criticized 6ix9ine and the rapper's approach to his comeback, claiming he is "not the repentant, quiet young man we saw in the courtroom". Setaro further remarked: "Instead, we saw a 24-year-old man obsessed with money, popularity, haters, and getting even. 6ix9ine fell right back into his favorite role: the upstart who doesn't conform to street codes, and wins anyway". He lambasted 6ix9ine for his lack of apologies toward those he wronged, saying he "only lists [...] the wrongs done to him, and why those wrongs render him blameless". Vulture's Craig Jenkins had a similar notion, regarding the song as "a long diatribe about how everyone's jealous because he's doing better than them". Jenkins went on to criticize the rapper, stating: "It's jarring having a rapper tell you his entire persona was really just a money-making shtick and then step right back into the character, to hear and see a hip-hop artist make a joke out of the fact that he sang on the stand in court", but concluded, "we can't stop him because we must know what happens next; our curiosity is his source of power". Justin Tinsley of The Undefeated labelled 6ix9ine a "stain on hip-hop", questioning his artistry: "Look at the conversation around 'GOOBA'; it's the theater around who he is that's the draw, not the lyrics. Again, I'd rather focus whatever energy I do have on art that matters. Art that's abundantly significant and rich in cultural sanity". "Gooba" was named one of the worst songs of 2020 on lists published by the Los Angeles Times and Insider.

== Chart performance and controversy ==
After "Gooba" debuted at number 3 on the Billboard Hot 100, 6ix9ine uploaded a video accusing Billboard of rigging and chart manipulation. He stated, "I want the world to know, that Billboard is a lie", while adding: "You can buy No. 1s on Billboard". He also went on to accuse pop singers Ariana Grande and Justin Bieber's management of buying downloads for their song "Stuck with U", which debuted at number 1 ahead of "Gooba". He alleged that "they purchased 30K copies with six credit cards". 6ix9ine claimed "It's all manipulated, it's all fabricated", showing the streams "Gooba" had accumulated in its first week, accusing Billboard of "disqualifying" 20 million or so streams. A few days prior to this, 6ix9ine had posted a video to Instagram showing an unidentified Hot 100 chart forecast where "Stuck with U" was placed at number 5. Later he posted another video, where, in his words, the song "went from being fifth place to first place out of nowhere", suggesting that Billboard was manipulating the Hot 100 and "playing favorites". In a lengthy online post, Grande indirectly responded to 6ix9ine, writing: "I didn't have a number one for the first five years of my career and it didn't upset me at all because from the bottom of my heart, my music is everything to me [...]". She went on to deny 6ix9ine's accusation that her and Bieber's team bought digital song downloads for the track: "Our fans bought this song (never more than four copies each, AS THE RULES STATE). Sales count for more than streams. U can not discredit this as hard as u try". Bieber also responded, pointing out that 6ix9ine counted global streams instead of just US streams and addressed his claims further, saying "Nielsen company checks this and found all our sales were legit because our fans are amazing and bought them". Scooter Braun, Grande and Bieber's manager, also responded, denying 6ix9ine's claims.

=== Billboard's response ===
Billboard responded later the same day, and "in the interest of transparency", denied any chart manipulation, explaining its chart methodology for the Hot 100. The magazine went on to address and detail every accusation made by 6ix9ine, including the 24-hour sales spike that "Stuck with U" received, noting that "singles were put up for sale in Grande and Bieber's webstores" on the final day of chart-tracking. Billboard also addressed 6ix9ine's claims that they would not "disclose" information about data when asked, stating that they [Billboard and Nielsen] cannot "provide granular detail on a title to anyone but its content owner" and further stressed that "data partners recognize excessive bulk purchases and remove those units from the final sales total. All titles this week, as in every week, were put under the same scrutiny". Regarding 6ix9ine's video of an unidentified chart forecast, Billboard said it "does not distribute any Hot 100 ranking forecast to labels, management or artists", and concluded that "Overall, Stuck with U drew 28.1 million U.S. streams, 26.3 million in radio airplay audience and 108,000 sold in the tracking week, which is why it got to number one whereas Gooba had 55.3 million U.S. streams, 172,000 in radio airplay audience and 24,000 sold".

== Music video ==
In the music video, 6ix9ine transforms into an animated rat, referencing his role as an informant during the trial of the Nine Trey Gangsters.

The music video was released alongside the official single release on May 8, 2020, and was shot in April 2020. Hernandez had previously asked a judge for permission to film the video in his backyard during home confinement. Upon release, the music video reached over 38.9 million views in its first 24 hours, breaking the record for the biggest debut for a hip hop song on YouTube, previously held by Eminem's "Killshot". On May 31, 2020, the music video was temporarily removed from YouTube due to a copyright complaint by Kenyan producer Magix Enga; he claimed that "Gooba" sampled one of his songs without permission.

=== Background and concept ===
The video was shot and directed by 6ix9ine himself, while under home confinement, stemming from 6ix9ine's supervised release from prison on April 2, 2020. It was directed by CanonF8, David Wept, and 6ix9ine himself, produced by Omar Reynoso and was shot less than two weeks before its release, with the rapper only being allowed to shoot for two hours per week, per a judge's order.

The video features 6ix9ine's girlfriend Rachel "Jade" Wattley and a "rainbow of big booty models" twerking, while covered in paint. In one scene, the video cuts to 6ix9ine transforming himself into an animated rat (a reference to him ratting out his former gang members). He also shows off his ankle monitor. The rapper's security guards are also seen in the video.

== Cover and parody versions ==
American nu metal/metalcore band Tallah covered the song with a parody music video released on May 10, 2020, two days after the release of the original track.

On June 17, 2020, South African-British social media personality and pornographic actress Belle Delphine released a version of "Gooba," entitled "I'm Back" to promote her return to the internet as well as her Instagram, TikTok and OnlyFans accounts. The video, which parodied both 6ix9ine's lyrics and music video, has since been removed from Delphine's YouTube page but currently holds 7.9 million views on her PornHub account as of June 2026.

== Personnel ==
Credits adapted from Tidal, BMI and YouTube.

- Daniel Hernandez – vocals, songwriting
- Jahnei Clarke – arrangement, songwriting, production
- Harald Sorebo – arrangement, songwriting, production
- Wizard Lee – mixing, mastering
- Alex Solis – art direction, design

== Charts ==
=== Weekly charts ===
Weekly chart performance of "Gooba"
| Chart (2020) | Peak position |
|---|---|
| Argentina Hot 100 (Billboard) | 72 |
| Australia (ARIA) | 14 |
| Austria (Ö3 Austria Top 40) | 3 |
| Belgium (Ultratop 50 Flanders) | 39 |
| Belgium (Ultratop 50 Wallonia) | 39 |
| Canada Hot 100 (Billboard) | 2 |
| Czech Republic Singles Digital (ČNS IFPI) | 1 |
| Denmark (Tracklisten) | 9 |
| Finland (Suomen virallinen lista) | 1 |
| France (SNEP) | 7 |
| Greece (IFPI) | 1 |
| Global 200 (Billboard) | 111 |
| Hungary (Single Top 40) | 1 |
| Hungary (Stream Top 40) | 1 |
| Iceland (Tónlistinn) | 12 |
| Ireland (IRMA) | 4 |
| Italy (FIMI) | 9 |
| Lithuania (AGATA) | 7 |
| Netherlands (Single Top 100) | 13 |
| New Zealand (Recorded Music NZ) | 14 |
| Norway (VG-lista) | 5 |
| Slovakia Singles Digital (ČNS IFPI) | 3 |
| Spain (PROMUSICAE) | 76 |
| Sweden (Sverigetopplistan) | 5 |
| Switzerland (Schweizer Hitparade) | 2 |
| UK Singles (Official Charts) | 6 |
| UK Independent (Official Charts) | 1 |
| US Billboard Hot 100 | 3 |
| US Hot R&B/Hip-Hop Songs (Billboard) | 2 |
| US Rolling Stone Top 100 | 2 |

=== Year-end charts ===
Year-end chart performance of "Gooba"
| Chart (2020) | Position |
|---|---|
| Austria (Ö3 Austria Top 40) | 68 |
| Hungary (Single Top 40) | 30 |
| Hungary (Stream Top 40) | 28 |
| Switzerland (Schweizer Hitparade) | 71 |
| US Hot R&B/Hip-Hop Songs (Billboard) | 61 |

== Certifications ==
| Region | Certification | Certified units/sales |
|---|---|---|
| Denmark (IFPI Danmark) | Gold | 45,000^{‡} |
| Italy (FIMI) | Gold | 35,000^{‡} |
| New Zealand (RMNZ) | Platinum | 30,000^{‡} |
| United Kingdom (BPI) | Silver | 200,000^{‡} |
| United States (RIAA) | Platinum | 1,000,000^{‡} |
^{‡} Sales+streaming figures based on certification alone.
