= Jonathan Strauss =

American music entrepreneur

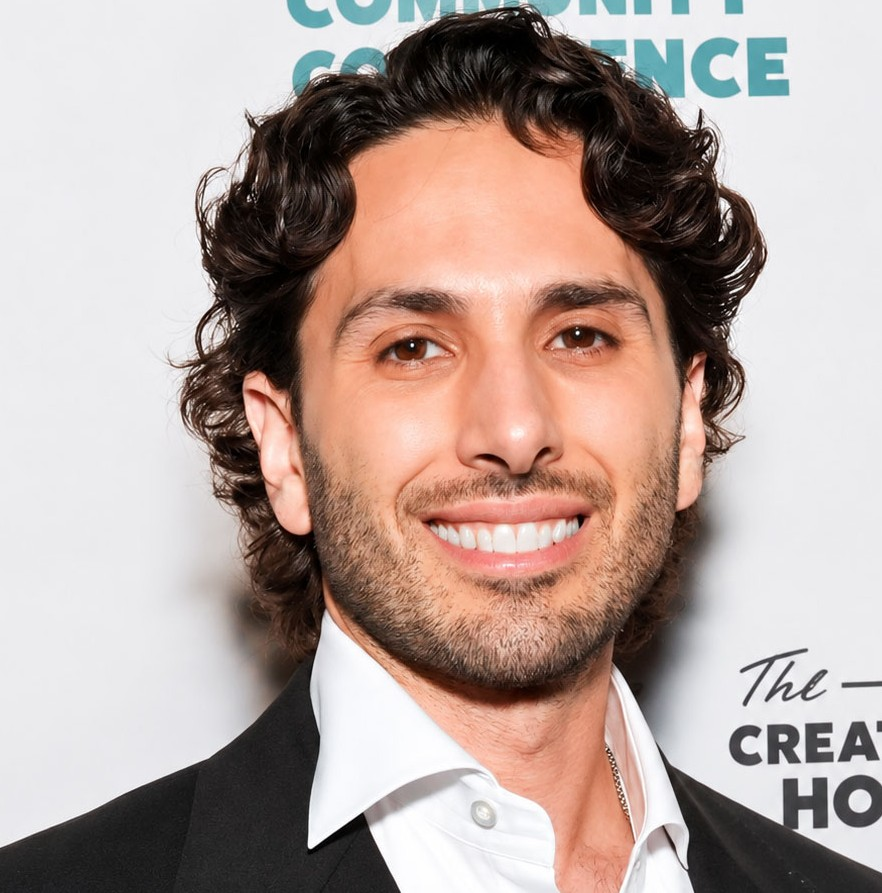
- Born: Palos Verdes Peninsula, California, United States
- Citizenship: American
- Education: University of California, Los Angeles (B.S. in Mathematics and Statistics)
- Occupations: Entrepreneur, business executive, record executive
- Years active: 2008–present
- Known for: Co-founder and CEO of Create Music Group

Jonathan Strauss is an American entrepreneur based in Los Angeles, California. He is the co-founder and Chief Executive Officer of Create Music Group, a record label and a global music group. Strauss is known for his data-driven approach to the music industry, he has built his career on identifying systemic inefficiencies in digital royalty collection and monetization.

== Early life and education ==
Strauss was born and raised in Palos Verdes in Los Angeles County, California. His father, Louis Strauss, was involved in music management during the 1970s and managed the band Three Dog Night. Strauss attended Palos Verdes Peninsula High School before enrolling at the University of California, Los Angeles (UCLA) around 2007. He pursued a Bachelor of Science degree in Mathematics and Statistics with a minor in Global Studies, graduating around 2010.

== Career ==
In 2015, Strauss co-founded Create Music Group (originally named CreateTV) with Alexandre Williams, a childhood friend from Palos Verdes who had worked as a music producer and at the distribution platform Label Engine. Strauss identified what he viewed as a systemic market failure in YouTube's Content ID system, where royalties from user-generated content often went unclaimed due to incomplete metadata registration by independent artists. Strauss's approach to the music industry is characterized by a quantitative, data-driven methodology that contrasts with the traditional "golden ear" intuition of record label executives.

Under Strauss's leadership, Create Music Group expanded from a YouTube monetization service into a vertically integrated music company encompassing distribution, music publishing, sync licensing, and content production. The company acquired Label Engine, which provided distribution infrastructure, and Flighthouse, a digital media brand with nearly 28 million TikTok followers. Strauss positioned Flighthouse as a proprietary marketing channel to promote the company's music releases.

As of 2019, Create Music Group ranked #2 on the Inc. 5000 list of fastest-growing companies in the United States, described as the highest ranking ever achieved by a music company. The company was also named to Fast Company's "Most Innovative Companies" list.

In June 2024, Create Music Group raised $165 million in a minority investment round led by Flexpoint Ford, valuing the company at $1 billion and granting it "unicorn" status. Following the investment, Strauss pursued an aggressive acquisition strategy in the independent music sector, acquiring catalogs including Berlin-based label !K7 Music, the Deadmau5 master recordings (valued at $55 million), UK dance label Cr2 Records, and a stake in UK publisher Enhanced Music.

In March 2026, Create Music Group completed a financing round consisting of more than $450 million in new equity and debt capital. The transaction valued the company at $2.2 billion, with Strauss and the other founders retaining majority ownership.

== Recognition ==
- Billboard's 40 Under 40.
- Billboard's Indie Power Players (2020).
- Billboard's Power 100 (2025).
- Billboard's New Power Generation (2019).
- Billboard's Power 100 (2026).
- Variety's New Hollywood Leaders 2020.
