= Sleiman (rapper) =

Danish rapper

Sleiman Nejim (born in Lebanon in 1982) is a Danish rapper of Palestinian origin. He is known by the mononym Sleiman.

He was born in Ain al-Hilweh Palestinian refugee camp near Sidon, Lebanon. He immigrated to Denmark as a child and grew up in Askerød, a housing project in Hundige, a suburb south of Copenhagen. He joined the local gang Bloodz and ended up with a criminal record and jail time. After an assassination attempt on him, he left gang life. He was subject of the 2012 biography Men vi blev onde by Olav Hergel.

Launching a rap career, he had great success with "Bomaye" that reached the top of Tracklisten, the official Danish Singles Chart. The title is derived from "Boma ye" (meaning kill him). It featured Livid & MellemFingaMuzik. The track was included in the similarly titled EP that reached number 4 in Danish Albums Chart.

== Discography ==
=== EPs ===
Title	Year	Peak positions
Title	Year	DEN
Bomaye	2016	4
Alt eller intet	2017	35

=== Singles ===
Title	Year	Peak positions	Album
Title	Year	DEN	Album
"Bomaye" (featuring Livid & MellemFingaMuzik)	2016	1	Bomaye
"Alt eller intet" (featuring Gilli)	2016	19	Alt eller intet
"For evigt ung"	2016	11	Alt eller intet
"Don Diego"	2017	6	Alt eller intet
"Chico"	2017	15	TBA
"Sicario"	2017	19	TBA
"Laila" (featuring Jimilian)	2017	10	TBA
"Dunya" (featuring Q)	2018	35	TBA
"R.E.D." (featuring Gilli and 6ix9ine)	2019	34	TBA
