= Shotti =

Trinidadian-American convicted felon

- Also known as: Tr3yway CEO
- Born: Kifano Jordan; April 14, 1982 (age 44); Trinidad, Trinidad and Tobago
- Origin: Bedford–Stuyvesant, Brooklyn, New York City, U.S.
- Occupations: Talent manager; record executive
- Label: Tr3yway Entertainment

Kifano Jordan (born April 14, 1982), better known by his stage name Shotti, is a Trinidadian-American talent manager. Shotti is best known for being rapper Tekashi 6ix9ine's manager from 2017 until November 2018.

Shotti is the founder of record label Tr3yway Entertainment. He is also a known member of the Nine Trey Gangsters, a set of the larger United Blood Nation which is the East Coast branch of the Bloods gang.

In 2019, Jordan was sentenced to 15 years in prison on various felony and racketeering charges, as part of the 2018 racketeering trial against him, 6ix9ine, and other associates.

== Early life ==
Kifano Jordan was born on April 14, 1982, in the Caribbean island of Trinidad, in the nation of Trinidad and Tobago, and later moved at a young age to the United States, settling in Bedford–Stuyvesant, Brooklyn, New York City.

== Career ==
Jordan and 6ix9ine met through mutual friendships in the summer of 2017, while 6ix9ine was working on his breakout, hit single "Gummo". From 2017-2018, Jordan served as 6ix9ine's manager and bodyguard, and introduced the rapper to the Nine Trey Gangster Bloods. The Bloods provided 6ix9ine with, in his own words, "career, credibility, street credibility, videos, music, protection". In return, 6ix9ine provided financial compensation to the gang's members, and repped the Nine Trey Bloods.

In 2018, it was reported that rapper Fetty Wap, who was featured on a 6ix9ine song, had signed with Tr3yway Entertainment.

In November 2018, 6ix9ine accused Jordan of stealing $2.2 million from him in tour money, as well as sleeping with his ex-girlfriend. Shotti denied the accusations. Amid these accusations and their 2018 racketeering trial, their business relationship dissolved.

== Legal issues ==
Jordan is known to have affiliation with the United Blood Nation's Nine Trey Gangsters set.

=== 2016 ===
Jordan was arrested in 2016 in Trenton, New Jersey on drug and weapon possession charges, after initially evading arrest. It was reported by Complex that during this incident, Jordan had instructed a female passenger to hide the drugs in their possession inside her vagina. After failing to appear in court, Jordan was named Hunterdon County's "Fugitive of the Week".

=== 2018 ===
In April 2018, Jordan was sentenced to 7 months of community jail after being ruled as a person of interest in a Barclays Center shooting, involving 6ix9ine and rapper Casanova.

In late 2018, Jordan was tied to a series of felony assaults, including 3 shootings and multiple drug and firearm charges. Jordan served as 6ix9ine's co-defendant in the Nine Trey Gangsters racketeering trial, during which 6ix9ine turned state's evidence against him and the Nine Trey Gangsters. 6ix9ine testified that in one incident, 6ix9ine, Shotti, and Nine Trey members had robbed a rival and were making their escape in Midtown traffic, when they heard police sirens. Shotti forced 6ix9ine to take the gun the members had in their possession, and "kicked him out" of their getaway car.

During a court appearance, Jordan was quoted as stating, "We don’t fold, we don’t bend, we don’t break. It's Treyway."

On March 28, 2019, Jordan pled guilty in the United States District Court for the Southern District of New York to multiple charges with a sentencing possibility of up to 15 years to life in prison. On September 6, 2019, Jordan was sentenced to 15 years in prison.
