= Lollipop (Darell song) =

- Cover of Remix version

Single by Darell

from the album Everybody Go to the Discotek
- Language: Spanish
- Released: October 8, 2023 (original); February 15, 2024 (remix)
- Genre: Bachatón
- Length: 3:19 (original); 4:27 (remix)
- Label: Sony Latin
- Producers: Ramoon; Lil Genuiz; Roc Legion

Darell singles chronology
"Wait Deh Man" (2023)	"Lollipop" (2023)	"Al Otro Nivel" (2024)

Ozuna singles chronology
"Carrusel" (2023)	"Lollipop (remix)" (2024)	"Guay" (2024)

Maluma singles chronology
"Bling Bling" (2024)	"Lollipop (remix)" (2024)	"Sacudelo" (2024)

Music video
- "Lollipop" on YouTube

"Lollipop" is a song by Puerto Rican rapper Darell. It was released by Sony Music Latin on October 8, 2023, as the seventh single from his third studio album Everybody Go to the Discotek. Darell wrote the song with Elías De León alongside producers Lil Geniuz, Ramoon and Sinfónico. On February 15, 2024, a remix of the song with the participation of Puerto Rican singer Ozuna and Colombian singer Maluma was released as a single on September 29, 2022, for digital download and streaming.

== Background ==
On July 28, 2023, Darell released his second studio album Everybody Go to the Discotek, and "Lollipop" was included as the fifth track. At the same day, an audio visualizer of the song was uploaded to YouTube along with the other song visualizers that appeared on the album. In December, 2023, Ozuna and Maluma confirmed their participation on the remix version. On February 15, 2024, the official remix of the song was released with a visualizer in Darell's YouTube channel.

== Music video ==
The music video for "Lollipop" was released on October 8, 2023, in Darell's YouTube channel and reached more than 370 million views, as of August 2025.

== Charts ==
Chart performance for "Lollipop"
Chart (2023)	Peak position
Central America (Monitor Latino)	5
Colombia (Monitor Latino)	9
Costa Rica (Monitor Latino)	8
Dominican Republic (Monitor Latino)	1
Ecuador (Monitor Latino)	9
El Salvador (Monitor Latino)	5
Guatemala (Monitor Latino)	11
Honduras (Monitor Latino)	1
Nicaragua (Monitor Latino)	2
Panama (Monitor Latino)	6
Peru (Monitor Latino)	3
Puerto Rico (Monitor Latino)	10
Spain (PROMUSICAE)	2

Chart performance for "Lollipop" (Remix)
Chart (2023)	Peak position
Argentina Hot 100 (Billboard)	2
Bolivia (Billboard)	18
Chile (Billboard)	5
Colombia (Billboard)	4
Ecuador (Billboard)	4
Global 200 (Billboard)	34
Peru (Billboard)	6
Spain (Billboard)	2
Spain (PROMUSICAE)	39
US Latin Airplay (Billboard)	18
US Latin Rhythm Airplay (Billboard)	7
US Hot Latin Songs (Billboard)	26

== Certifications ==
Certifications for "Lollipop"
Region	Certification	Certified units/sales
Mexico (AMPROFON)	Gold	70,000^{‡}
Spain (PROMUSICAE)	2× Platinum	120,000^{‡}
Spain (PROMUSICAE) Remix version	Gold	30,000^{‡}
United States (RIAA)	6× Platinum (Latin)	360,000^{‡}
United States (RIAA) Remix version	Gold (Latin)	30,000^{‡}
^{‡} Sales+streaming figures based on certification alone.
