= Ramoon =

Moroccan record producer

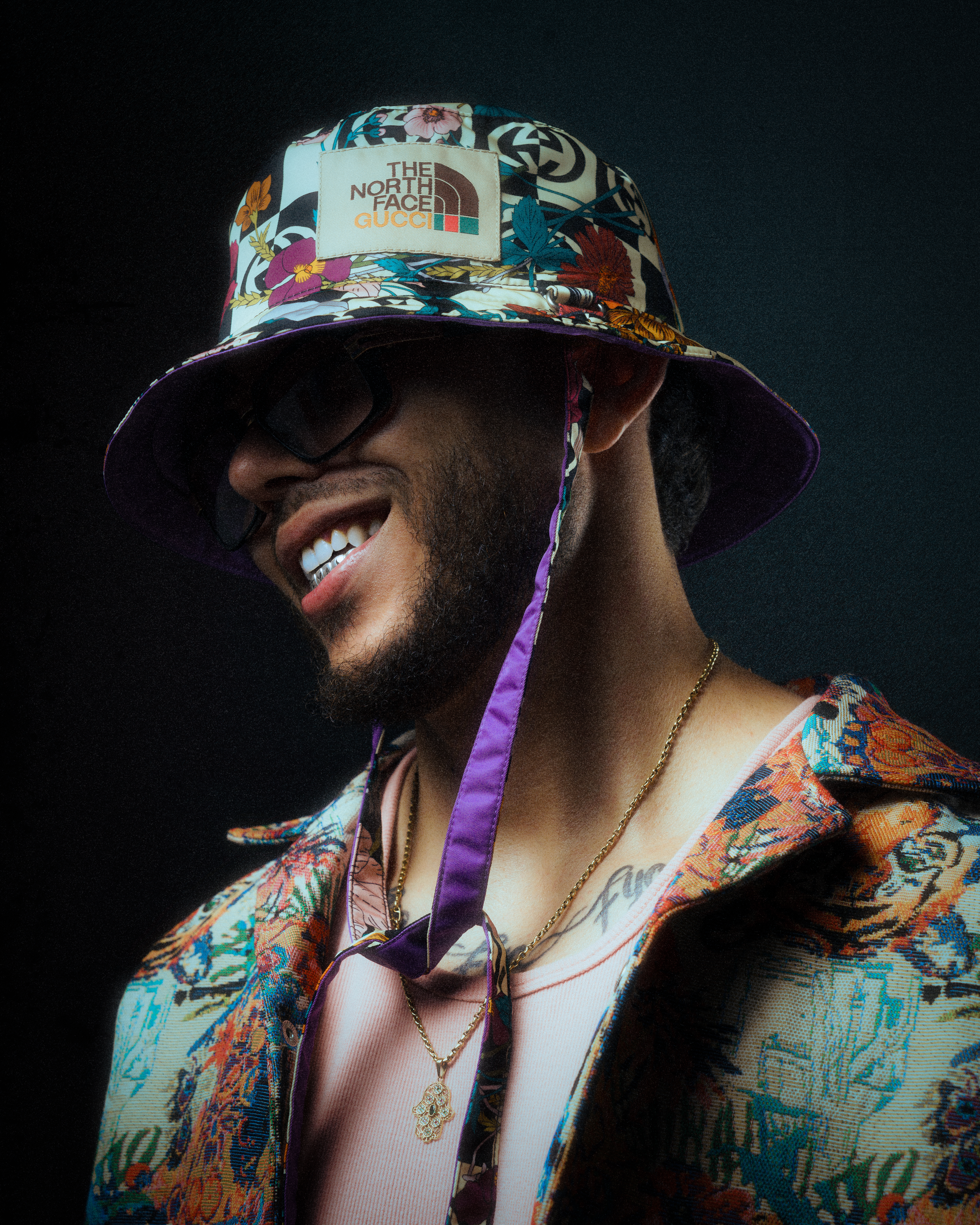
- Ramoon in 2024

Background information
- Born: Anas Rahmoune; Rabat, Morocco
- Genres: hip-hop; afrobeats; amapiano; dancehall
- Occupations: Record producer, songwriter, Dj
- Instruments: drums, kamanja, qraqeb, claps
- Years active: 2016-present
- Labels: Mass Appeal
- Website: https://fyasound.com/

Anas Rahmoune (Arabic: أنس رحمون), known professionally by his stage name Ramoon, is a Moroccan record producer and DJ from Rabat. He is known for blending Moroccan and broader African rhythms with hip hop, R&B, dancehall, Afrobeats, and amapiano. His work includes credits with 6ix9ine, Darell, Russ, AP Dhillon, and Moroccan rappers like Stormy and 7liwa.

== Early life and beginnings ==
Ramoon grew up in Rabat and Salé, developing an early interest in music after discovering his father’s guitar. As a teenager he taught himself to play covers influenced by artists such as Cat Stevens, the Beatles, Guns N’ Roses, and Michael Jackson. He was also immersed in a wide palette of regional sounds, including Sherine, Majida El Roumi, Algerian Raï, and Moroccan rap.

== Career ==
Ramoon began uploading beats to platforms like YouTube and BeatStars around 2016, which he cites as a key pathway to industry access and international collaborations. A beat uploaded online led to his placement on 6ix9ine’s 2020 single “YAYA,” where he is credited as a producer and songwriter.

In addition to “YAYA,” Ramoon accumulated international credits across Latin and European markets, including work with Darell on “Lollipop” (and its remix with Ozuna and Maluma), as well as collaborations with artists such as Russ, Teto, Saske, and Sidarta. His contributions to these records helped him garner multi‑platinum certifications.

Domestically, Ramoon has worked with frontline Moroccan rappers including 7liwa, Stormy, Draganov, and 7ari. With 7ari, he co‑created the 12‑track album 101, and the project topping Moroccan charts. Arab News reported that the album partnered with US-based Mass Appeal.

== impact ==
Media in MENA have profiled Ramoon as a leading Moroccan producer of his generation. Rolling Stone MENA highlighted his cross‑regional influences and rise from local beginnings to chart success, while titles such as GQ Middle East and MILLE WORLD listed him among notable Arab producers of the moment. DimaTOP Magazine named him Producer of the Month for July 2025, citing consistent hit-making and the full‑album production of 101.

== Production style ==
Ramoon’s production integrates Moroccan and North/West African rhythmic vocabularies with contemporary global forms. He has discussed hybridizing gnawa and amapiano, and pairing aita with Afrobeats, aiming to keep Moroccan identity in rhythm and timbre while using globally familiar song structures and textures. Ramoon incorporates Moroccan instruments in his beats as he believes Morap as needs to stay rooted locally while reaching globally.

== Discography (selected credits) ==
- 6ix9ine — YAYA (producer/songwriter)
- Darell — Lollipop (production on record cycle; later remixed with Ozuna and Maluma)
- Russ Ft. DIVINE — Bornfire
- AP Dhillon — Bora Bora
- 7liwa — Toress
- Stormy — Khouya
- 7ari & Ramoon — 101 (album; full production)
