= Nine Trey Gangsters =

Black American street gang

- Founded: 1993; 33 years ago
- Founder: Omar Portee and Leonard McKenzie
- Founding location: Rikers Island, New York City, New York, United States
- Years active: 1993–present
- Territory: East Coast, Mid Atlantic and Southeastern U.S.
- Ethnicity: Black American, Caribbean American
- Activities: Drug trafficking, pimping, robbery, extortion and counterfeiting
- Allies: Lucchese crime family United Blood Nation
- Rivals: Crips
- Notable members: 6ix9ine (formerly), Jim Jones, Juelz Santana, Shotti

The Nine Trey Gangster Bloods or Nine Trey Gangsta Bloods (NTG) (also known simply as Nine Trey Gangsters or referred to as Bentley's or Billionaires) are a "set" of the United Blood Nation street gang, which is itself a set of the Bloods gang. The gang operates on the East Coast of the United States.

== History ==
The gang initially sold various narcotics including heroin, crack cocaine and PCP throughout Harlem. They based their drug selling business in uninhabited buildings in the vicinity of Lenox Avenue. Disadvantaged people including the homeless, prostitutes and children were allegedly used to sell the narcotics for the gang.

The gang has operated in the U.S. state of Virginia and other states. It has allegedly been engaged in the sex trafficking of women and racketeering in Virginia, New York, North Carolina, Baltimore, New Jersey and other areas. The gang was also allegedly involved in the distribution of illegal drugs, including heroin, cocaine, crack, ecstasy, marijuana and prescription painkillers in these areas. Further allegations include dealing in counterfeit U.S. currency and using counterfeit currency to "finance wholesale drug purchases".

The gang has been investigated by the U.S. FBI, DEA, and ATF as well as various other gang task forces in the United States.

== Arrests and prosecution ==
=== 2006 ===
In July 2006, approximately 50 members of the gang were arrested as an outcome of a significant police operation called "Operation Nine Connect". After these initial arrests, at least another 30 arrests were made.

=== 2011 ===
In June 2011, Robert "Snoop" Christie pleaded guilty to a weapons charge in a plea bargain. This conviction received a five-year prison sentence, which was added on to an eight year sentence Christie was already serving for a previous weapon and drug conviction.

=== 2013 ===
In March 2013, eight alleged gang members and associates appeared in federal court facing charges based on a "major crack cocaine investigation". Specific details of the case were sealed under court order at that time because an ongoing investigation was being conducted by the FBI and Drug Enforcement Administration, and it was stated that the release of information could have had an "adverse result" upon the investigation.

=== 2014 ===
In February 2014, the U.S. Attorney's Office for the Eastern District of Virginia announced that following a trial that began on February 11, 2014, three members of the gang, including Thaddaeus Snow, were convicted by a federal jury for racketeering, robbery, cocaine distribution, sex trafficking and firearms-related offenses. Upon this conviction, 24 individuals named in the initial September 2013 indictment were also subsequently convicted.

=== 2016 ===
In November 2016, four members of the Nine Trey Gangsters were indicted for their alleged involvement in 10 shootings that left 5 dead during December 2015 in Norfolk, Virginia.

=== 2017–2019 ===
Members of the Nine Trey Gangsters were featured prominently in rapper Tekashi 6ix9ine's 2017 hit song "Gummo", and subsequent music videos from 6ix9ine. The Nine Trey Bloods and 6ix9ine forged a partnership, with 6ix9ine receiving, in his words, "career, credibility, street credibility, videos, music, and protection" from the gang, while 6ix9ine financially compensated the gang members. 6ix9ine claimed affiliation with the Nine Trey Bloods, and was extorted by the gang.

In July of 2018, 6ix9ine was kidnapped, assaulted, and robbed by two members of the Nine Trey Gangsters, Anthony "Harv" Ellison and Aljermiah "Nuke" Mack.

In November 2018, Tekashi 6ix9ine, his manager Kifano "Shotti" Jordan, and other members of the Nine Trey Gangsters were arrested by the Homeland Security Investigations Gang Unit along with the Bureau of Alcohol, Tobacco, Firearms and Explosives, and charged with racketeering related to operating a criminal enterprise, conspiracy to murder, robbery, extortion, and drug distribution. 6ix9ine turned state's evidence during the trial, and testified against the gang, dissolving his ties with them. Shotti, his manager, received a 15 year sentence, while 6ix9ine was released on April 2, 2020.

=== 2023–2024 ===
A "five star general", or high ranking member, of the Nine Trey Gangsters with ties to the Lucchese crime family was arrested in December 2023 at Teterboro Airport in Teterboro, New Jersey. He was in possession of "12 kilos of cocaine, more than 500 pounds of marijuana, 1,000 THC cartridges and fake IDs".

Four members of the Nine Trey Gangsters in Canton, Georgia, including two gang leaders charged under Georgia's RICO statute, were arrested and charged with a series of car break-ins.

== See also ==
- Gangs in the United States
- List of gangs in the United States
- United Blood Nation
