= Omar Portee =

American gang leader

- Born: c. 1969 (age 56–57); New York City, New York, U.S.
- Other names: "O.G. Mack"; "The Big Homie"
- Occupation: Crime boss
- Allegiance: United Blood Nation
- Convictions: Racketeering, murder, conspiracy, credit card fraud, and drug trafficking (2002)
- Penalty: 50 years' imprisonment (2003)

Details
- Imprisoned at: United States Penitentiary, Florence ADX

Omar Portee (born c. 1969), also known as "O.G. Mack", is an American gang leader, known for founding the United Blood Nation gang while serving a prison sentence at Rikers Island, New York, in 1993.

== Criminal career ==
Portee began his criminal career as a robber at the age of 17. In the early hours of August 16, 1987, he claimed to have witnessed Don Taylor shoot and kill Terrance Joyner in the Bronx. Based on Portee's eyewitness testimony, Taylor was convicted on April 25, 1989, and sentenced to 22 1/2 years-to-life in prison. At the time of his original testimony, Portee was facing multiple charges in New York stemming from his arrest on August 31, 1987. He faced substantial prison time, 16 2/3-to-50 years, if convicted. Instead, as part of a cooperation agreement, which included his testimony against Don Taylor in People v Taylor, Portee was allowed to plead to two to six years for all charged crimes (two 1st-degree robbery convictions), received credit for 21 months' time served and was promised a favorable letter to the parole board. He started serving his sentence on June 9, 1989. He was released on June 20, 1990. Portee later recanted his prior testimony, and Taylor's conviction was vacated in 2004, whereupon Taylor was released from prison after having served over 10 years.

=== United Blood Nation ===
In August 1992, Portee was sentenced to 2 1/2-to-five years in prison for criminal possession of weapon in the third degree. He and a fellow inmate, Leonard "OG Dead Eye" McKenzie, established the United Blood Nation, initially as a prison gang, while incarcerated at Rikers Island in 1993. The United Blood Nation would become responsible for spreading gang violence from Los Angeles to New York City. On March 12, 1996, Portee led an attack, armed with a shiv fashioned from a Scrabble game piece, on members of the rival Latin Kings gang. Three inmates were slashed in the incident.

Portee was released from prison on June 22, 1999, and returned to the streets to build the Bloods into a powerful street gang. He divided the gang into numerous subgroups, or "sets", such as the One Eight Trey, Sex Money Murder, and the Gangsta Killer Bloods. Basing his operations around 183rd Street and Davidson Avenue in the Bronx, Portee led the One Eight Trey faction and ruled over a drug, prostitution and theft empire by recruiting gang members as young as 16 years of age and ordering numerous acts of violence against rival drug dealers.

=== Conviction and imprisonment ===
On August 27, 2002, Portee was convicted of ten counts of criminal activity, including racketeering, murder, conspiracy, credit card fraud, and drug trafficking. He was sentenced to fifty years' imprisonment, by Federal Court Judge Naomi Reice Buchwald, on April 14, 2003.

Portee is currently incarcerated in ADX Florence in Fremont County, Colorado. In 2021, Portee was moved from ADX to United States Penitentiary, Florence High, in the ADX step-down program. As of January 2022, Portee is back at ADX.

In 2018, Portee was profiled in an episode of the documentary series Gangsters: America's Most Evil.
