= Trial of the Nine Trey Gangsters =

Criminal case

United States v. Jones
- Court: United States District Court for the Southern District of New York
- Full case name: United States of America v. Jamel Jones a/k/a "Mel Murda", Kifano Jordan a/k/a "Shotti", Fuguan Lovick a/k/a "Fu Banga", Jesnel Butler a/k/a "Ish", Daniel Hernandez a/k/a "Tekashi 6ix 9ine", and Faheem Walter, a/k/a "Crippy"

Court membership
- Judge sitting: Paul A. Engelmayer

The trial of the Nine Trey Gangsters was a criminal case against eleven (Note: Six people were initially charged on November 18, 2018. Five additional people were charged between November 2018 and January 2019. See list of co-defendants.) alleged members and associates of the street gang Nine Trey Gangsters. The case is notable for its inclusion of rapper 6ix9ine, real name Daniel Hernandez, and his associate Kifano "Shotti" Jordan as defendants.

The men were indicted on charges related to racketeering, weapon possession, and conspiracy to commit murder. Hernandez was quickly made a person of interest in these charges and was apprehended alongside five other men on November 18, 2018, following a five-year joint investigation by the Department of Homeland Security (DHS), the New York Police Department (NYPD), and the Bureau of Alcohol, Tobacco, Firearms and Explosives (ATF).

Upon his arrest, Hernandez was initially denied bail and pleaded not guilty to all charges. He later changed his plea to guilty after agreeing to a deal with law enforcement on February 1, 2019. The guilty plea resulted in Hernandez admitting his guilt and testifying against his co-defendants, as well as full co-operation and an insistence to commit no further crimes, in exchange for reduced prison time. On December 18, 2019, Hernandez was sentenced to two years in prison, a $35,000 fine, five years of supervised release, and 1,000 hours of community service. Hernandez ended up avoiding a potential minimum sentence of 47 years. Hernandez was originally set to be released on November 18, 2020, although his attorney Lance Lazzaro claimed "6ix9ine will be released ahead of schedule." His new release date was set for August 2, 2020, although reports surfaced saying he may be released as early as July 31, 2020. However, on April 1, 2020, federal judge Paul Engelmayer ordered Hernandez to serve the remainder of his sentence in home confinement starting the next day due to him suffering from asthma which makes him particularly vulnerable to COVID-19.

== Background ==
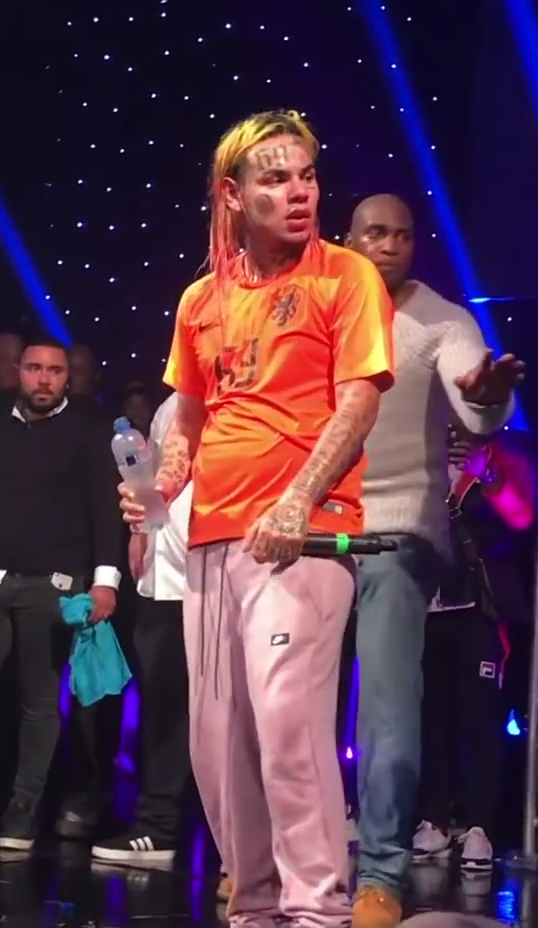
6ix9ine (pictured) was arrested in the week leading up to the scheduled release of his debut album Dummy Boy.

In October 2018, Hernandez was sentenced to two years' probation and 1,000 hours of community service after pleading guilty to federal racketeering and firearms charges. To celebrate receiving probation instead of a jail sentence, Hernandez went to go have dinner with a music executive in New York City. His entourage was not allowed in by security, and this led to a fight that ended with one person being shot. Two members of Hernandez's entourage were charged with gang assault. Hernandez's manager Jordan later turned himself in on November 7, 2018, in relation to the fight and was also charged with gang assault.

On November 15, 2018, three days prior to the arrests and a week prior to the scheduled release of his debut album Dummy Boy, Hernandez unexpectedly announced on Instagram that he had fired his entire team, including his management. He also cancelled his upcoming tour and said, "Whoever is booking shows for Tekashi 6ix9ine, is stealing your fucking money."

== Arrest and guilty plea ==
=== November 2018–January 2019: 'Not guilty' plea ===
On the night of November 18, 2018, six men were arrested by ATF agents in New York City: Hernandez, Jordan, Jamel "Mel Murda" Jones, Fuguan "Fu Banga" Lovick, Jesnel "Ish" Butler, and Faheem "Crippy" Walter. The next night while being detained at the Brooklyn Metropolitan Detention Center, Hernandez was confronted by inmates affiliated with the rival Crips gang. Prison staff intervened and quickly transferred Hernandez to a different facility to eliminate any future gang threats. On November 22, 2018, a seventh man, Roland "Ro Murda" Martin, was arrested and charged with crimes related to the case. Hernandez's arrest caused his highly anticipated debut album Dummy Boy to be delayed indefinitely a day before its scheduled release. After an online leak, Dummy Boy was released on November 27, 2018, and managed to reach number 2 on the Billboard 200 within only three days of charting.

"We don't fold, we don't bend, we don't break. It's Tr3yway."

— Kifano "Shotti" Jordan in court, November 26, 2018

On November 26, 2018, Hernandez pleaded not guilty and was denied bail, with a court date set for September 4, 2019. Hernandez's lawyer continued to plea that his client was "...completely innocent of all charges being brought against him... An entertainer who portrays a 'gangster image' to promote his music does not make him a member of an enterprise." An eighth defendant, Aaron "Bat" Young, was charged on December 19, 2018.

=== February 2019–present: Co-operation with prosecutors ===
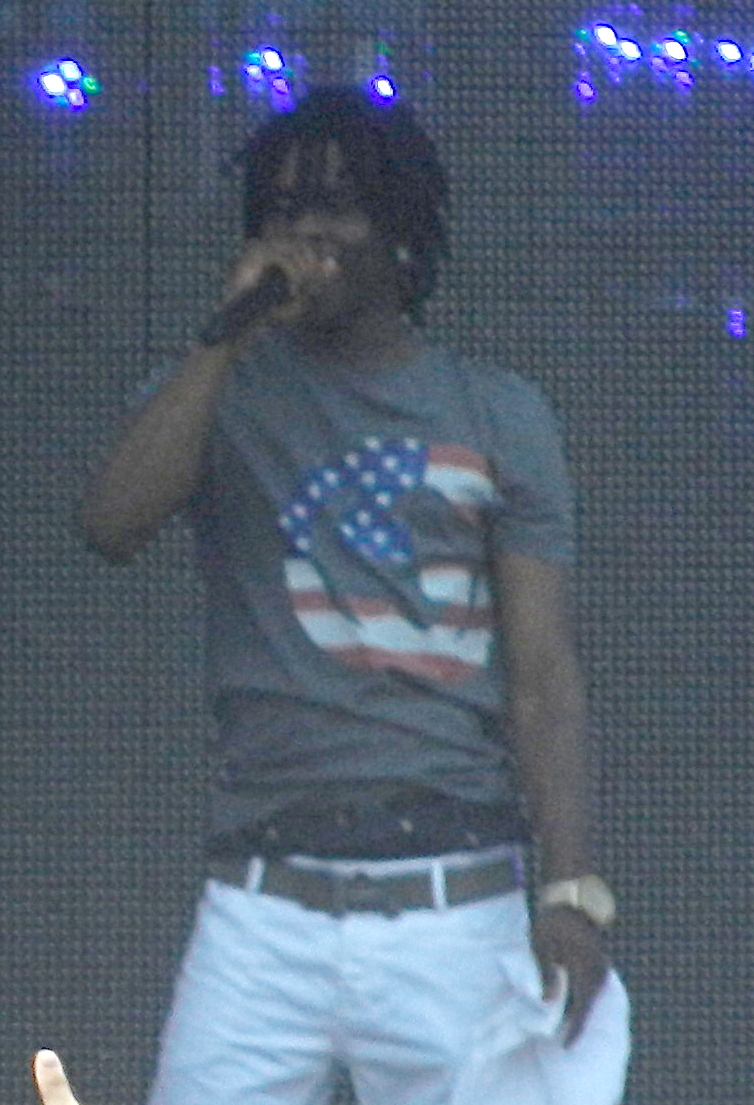
Rapper Chief Keef was allegedly shot at by Hernandez's associates after engaging in an online feud with the rapper in June 2018.

On January 22, 2019, three other members of the Nine Trey Gangsters were charged as part of the investigation: Kintea "Kooda B" McKenzie, Denard "Drama" Butler, and Anthony "Harv" Ellison. McKenzie was indicted for attempting to shoot American rapper Chief Keef in June 2018. Hernandez admitted that after becoming embroiled in an online feud with Chief Keef, he offered $20,000 to McKenzie to carry out the shooting. McKenzie carried out the attack outside the W Hotel in Manhattan, though no one was injured. After the shooting, McKenzie allegedly met with Hernandez and Jordan, settling for a payment of $10,000 for the attack.

Butler was indicted for taking part in a separate attempted shooting of Chief Keef on July 16, 2018, where a bystander was injured by the gunfire. Ellison was indicted for kidnapping and assaulting Hernandez on July 22, 2018, after he claimed Hernandez disrespected the Nine Treys. At the time, Hernandez reported the incident to police in July 2018, claiming that he had been pistol-whipped and forced in a car, but soon became uncooperative during the initial investigation.

On January 23, 2019, Hernandez changed his plea to guilty to all nine charges against him, and admitted to being a member of the Nine Trey Gangsters. Hernandez pledged to cooperate with prosecutors against others. As part of the plea agreement, Hernandez will not be fully prosecuted for any of his nine charges as long as he fully cooperates in testifying against others and commits no further crimes. Following Hernandez's guilty plea, prosecutors leveled additional firearms and racketeering charges against Jordan.

Hernandez's lawyer Dawn Florio began devising a plan to get him out of federal custody before September 2019 if the other co-defendants take plea deals to avoid a trial. On March 28, 2019, Jordan became the second co-defendant to enter a guilty plea. Jordan stated that "[6ix9ine] broke every code. But I forgive the little nigga after all that. It's all good", and noted that "Treyway still stands strong. I want that to be known." In September 2019, Jordan was sentenced to 15 years in prison after pleading guilty to one count of firearm possession during a crime and one count of firearm discharge during a crime.

On April 2, 2019, Jesnel "Ish" Butler pleaded guilty to one firearms charge involving the April 2018 robbery of a backpack belonging to "Scum Lord D!zzy", the owner of Hernandez's label ScumGang. The next day, Walter pleaded guilty for involvement in the robbery as well. Jones also pleaded guilty to one count of racketeering conspiracy and one count of participating in a narcotics distribution conspiracy for helping to move heroin and fentanyl. On April 19, 2019, Young pleaded guilty, becoming the sixth of the 11 defendants that have entered a guilty plea in the case.

== List of co-defendants ==
No.	Defendant	Date charged	Guilty plea	Release date	Incarcerated at	Mugshots
1	Jamel "Mel Murda" Jones	November 18, 2018	April 3, 2019	August 27, 2025	Released	Government Exhibit 7
2	Kifano "Shotti" Jordan	November 18, 2018	March 28, 2019	October 24, 2031	USP Allenwood	Government Exhibit 8
3	Fuguan "Fu Banga" Lovick	November 18, 2018	May 9, 2019	June 26, 2024	Released	
4	Jesnel "Ish" Butler	November 18, 2018	April 2, 2019	February 22, 2023	Released	
5	Daniel "Tekashi 6ix9ine" Hernandez	November 18, 2018	January 23, 2019	April 2, 2020	Released	
6	Faheem "Crippy" Walter	November 18, 2018	April 3, 2019	September 11, 2023	Released	
7	Roland "Ro Murda" Martin	November 22, 2018	June 27, 2019	February 13, 2023	Released	
8	Aaron "Bat" Young	December 19, 2018	April 3, 2019	March 25, 2035	FCI Edgefield	
9	Anthony "Harv" Ellison	January 22, 2019	November 4, 2020	November 1, 2039	USP Canaan	Government Exhibit 2
10	Denard "Drama" Butler	January 22, 2019	June 4, 2019	August 8, 2023	Released	
11	Kintea "Kooda B" McKenzie	January 22, 2019	June 3, 2019	March 17, 2023	Released	
12	Aljermiah "Nuke" Mack	June 6, 2019	Not guilty plea Convicted October 3, 2019	January 23, 2034	USP Coleman I	Government Exhibit 1

== Timeline & Co-Defendants of trial ==
"Billy"
The song "Billy" was partially admitted as evidence, where Hernandez testified that the chorus "Whole squad full of fuckin' killers, I’m a killer too" did not represent crimes committed by the Nine Trey Bloods.

The trial and its testimonies began on September 16, 2019 with Hernandez testifying for the government the next day. He disclosed the gang's inner structure and activities and later mentioned fellow rappers Jim Jones and Cardi B as members of various gangs.

On October 3, defendants Anthony "Harv" Ellison and Aljermiah "Nuke" Mack were found guilty on kidnapping and racketeering charges, and currently face up to life in prison.

On December 18, Hernandez was sentenced to 2 years in prison minus the 13 months already served, and 5 years of supervised liberty. On Thursday, April 2, 2020, Hernandez's lawyer, Dawn Florio, confirmed with XXL magazine that the court decided to allow the rapper to be released from prison and into home confinement. This was after Hernandez requested to serve the remainder of his prison sentence at home stating he was at a higher risk of contracting the COVID-19 virus due to his pre-existing asthma and bronchitis conditions. He was originally set to be released on August 2, 2020.
