= Trollz (song) =

2020 single by 6ix9ine and Nicki Minaj

Single by 6ix9ine and Nicki Minaj

from the album TattleTales
- Released: June 12, 2020
- Recorded: April–May 2020
- Genre: Hip hop
- Length: 3:22: 3:06 (alternative version)
- Label: Scumgang; Create; 10K Projects
- Songwriters: Daniel Hernandez; Onika Maraj; Jeremiah Raisen; Aaron Clarke
- Producers: SadPony; Jahnei Clarke (co.)

6ix9ine singles chronology
"Gooba" (2020)	"Trollz" (2020)	"Yaya" (2020)

Nicki Minaj singles chronology
"Say So" (remix) (2020)	"Trollz" (2020)	"Move Ya Hips" (2020)

Music video
- "Trollz" on YouTube

"Trollz" is a song by American rapper 6ix9ine and Trinidadian rapper Nicki Minaj. It was released as the second single from the former's second studio album, TattleTales (2020). It was postponed twice before being released on June 12, 2020, as the follow-up to "Gooba", released four weeks earlier. It was written by the artists, along with its producers Sadpony and Jahnei Clarke, the latter having also produced "Gooba". The song marked the third collaboration between the artists, following 2018's "Fefe" (with Murda Beatz) and "Mama" (with Kanye West). Lyrically, the song takes aim at internet trolls.

On June 16, 2020, a new version of the song was released, featuring a different verse from Minaj, a new verse by Hernandez, and an altered beat. The song debuted at number one on the Billboard Hot 100, and became the first song to top the chart from an indie label since XXXTentacion's "Sad!" in 2018.

== Background and release ==
After having been released from prison early, in April 2020, Hernandez released his first single after his prison sentence on May 8, 2020, titled "Gooba". Following his controversial accusations towards Billboard of rigging and chart manipulation, and towards pop singers Ariana Grande and Justin Bieber's management of buying "30,000 copies with six credit cards" for their song "Stuck with U", 6ix9ine posted a photo of himself holding up six credit cards, writing in the caption, "Don't worry we going #1 next time @billboard." On May 17, 2020, he announced that he would take a short hiatus from social media and release a video the following Friday. He also promised a new song set to be released on May 22 if "Gooba" got 10,000 downloads. However, the scheduled release was subsequently postponed to May 29. On May 23, he asked his fans to come up with the song title of his upcoming single, which turned out to be "Trollz". Shortly thereafter, Hernandez posted a video of himself confirming the title. The rapper further revealed that the song features another artist. On June 3, 6ix9ine announced the song was again delayed to June 12, stating it is "out of respect for" the ongoing George Floyd protests.

Minaj visited 6ix9ine in May 2020 to begin shooting the music video. On June 10, 2020, it was confirmed that Minaj was the previously announced guest artist via the official merchandise bundled with the song on her website.

== Composition and lyrics ==
The song is driven by an electronic drum backing track and contains a laconic beat. On the song, 6ix9ine employs his "usual" braggadocious delivery, with Minaj's lyrics containing sex euphemisms. Minaj explained that she recorded eleven different versions before the song was released in its final form.

Alex Zidel of HotNewHipHop noted that Minaj's verse contains a possible dig at singer Usher, when she raps: "Somebody usher this nigga into a clinic/My flow's still sick, I ain't talkin' a pandemic". Shortly before the song's release, Usher had said Minaj "got her 'blueprint' from Lil Kim", and he previously faced herpes accusations.

An alternate version of the song was also released, which opens with Minaj's original verse, as she raps in English with Spanish words ("He tryna put it in my culo, real fat gato / When he eat it, I tell him to squeeze it like a taco"). Prior to the song's release, Minaj tweeted the taco emoji, hinting at the song's lyrics.

== Critical reception ==
In a positive review, Jason Lipshutz of Billboard included the song among the most essential releases of the week, noting that 6ix9ine "punctuates his verse with a throat-clearing assault", while Minaj "radiates slick confidence through sex euphemisms and nods to her longevity". In a negative review, "Trollz" was included on a list of the "Worst Songs of 2020" published by Variety.

== Commercial performance ==
The song debuted at the top of the US Billboard Hot 100, becoming 6ix9ine's first number-one single in the country, and Minaj's second and her first as lead artist. She also became the second female rapper to debut atop the Hot 100, following Lauryn Hill in 1998. The following week, the song dropped to number 34, and broke the record for largest drop down the chart from number one in Hot 100 history; Taylor Swift's "Willow" (2020) later broke the record. "Trollz" spent a total of four weeks on the Hot 100, marking the second fewest weeks for a Hot 100 number one song in history. Furthermore, it topped the Billboard Digital Songs chart selling 116,000 downloads, becoming 6ix9ine's first chart-topper and Minaj's sixth, as well. It marked the largest song sales week since Taylor Swift's "Me!" featuring Brendon Urie (2019) opened with 193,000 downloads sold, and the largest of 2020 at the time.

== Music video ==
The accompanying music video was released alongside the official single release on June 12, 2020. It was shot in May 2020 and Minaj revealed that the video was shot in 6ix9ine's guest bedroom while the latter was still under home confinement. After both artists claimed that the video broke the record for most views for a hip hop song in the first 24 hours, YouTube denied this, stating that the video only received 32.5 million views, 6.4 million less than "Gooba". A representative for the company said "paid advertising views on YouTube will no longer be considered when looking at a 24-hour record debut".

=== Synopsis ===
Similar to the "Gooba" video, "Trollz" has a colorful, rainbow-themed visual. The video starts off with the rappers eating cotton candy. This is followed by a transition where Minaj is seen with multicolored hair, twerking in a red Jacuzzi. She is seen topless with star pasties covering her breasts, wearing blonde and pastel-colored hair, and dressed in a fur bikini and a red, sheer bodysuit. 6ix9ine performs his verse and the hook in red, then blonde and rainbow cornrows. The video also cuts to him holding over $200,000 in cash and, as in the "Gooba" video, shows off his GPS ankle monitor.

== Personnel ==
Credits adapted from Tidal, BMI and YouTube.

- 6ix9ine – lead artist, songwriting
- Nicki Minaj – lead artist, songwriting
- Jeremiah Raisen – arrangement, songwriting, production
- Jahnei Clarke – arrangement, additional production, mixing
- Aaron Clarke – songwriting
- Wizard Lee – mixing, mastering
- Big Juice – mixing
- Alex Solis – art direction, design

== Charts ==
=== Weekly charts ===
Weekly chart performance for "Trollz"
Chart (2020)	Peak position
Australia (ARIA)	45
Austria (Ö3 Austria Top 40)	8
Belgium (Ultratip Bubbling Under Flanders)	12
Belgium (Ultratip Bubbling Under Wallonia)	17
Canada Hot 100 (Billboard)	4
Czech Republic Singles Digital (ČNS IFPI)	17
Euro Digital Song Sales (Billboard)	2
France (SNEP)	45
Greece (IFPI)	8
Hungary (Single Top 40)	2
Hungary (Stream Top 40)	6
Ireland (IRMA)	12
Italy (FIMI)	60
Netherlands (Single Top 100)	51
New Zealand Hot Singles (RMNZ)	3
Scottish Singles Sales (Official Charts)	11
Slovakia Singles Digital (ČNS IFPI)	17
Sweden (Sverigetopplistan)	51
Switzerland (Schweizer Hitparade)	8
UK Singles (Official Charts)	12
UK Hip Hop/R&B (Official Charts)	10
US Billboard Hot 100	1
US Hot R&B/Hip-Hop Songs (Billboard)	1
US R&B/Hip-Hop Airplay (Billboard)	49
US Rhythmic Airplay (Billboard)	32
US Rolling Stone Top 100	3

=== Year-end charts ===
Year-end chart performance for "Trollz"
Chart (2020)	Position
Hungary (Single Top 40)	58

== Certifications ==
Certifications and sales for "Trollz"
Region	Certification	Certified units/sales
United States (RIAA)	Platinum	1,000,000^{‡}
^{‡} Sales+streaming figures based on certification alone.

== Release history ==
Release dates and formats for "Trollz"
Region	Date	Format	Label	Ref.
Various	June 12, 2020	Digital download; streaming; 7-inch; CD; cassette	Scumgang; Create; 10k Projects	

== See also ==
- List of Billboard Hot 100 number ones of 2020
