= MellemFingaMuzik =

Danish rapping duo

- Origin: Denmark
- Genres: Hip-hop
- Years active: 2011–2019
- Label: HideOut / Grounded
- Members: Branco (Benjamin Cimatu); Stepz (Ibrahim Kucukavci)

MellemFingaMuzik is a Danish hip-hop group, consisting of rappers Stepz (Ibrahim Kucukavci) and Branco (Benjamin Cimatu). The duo started publishing materials in late 2011, after which they joined the Danish record label HideOut that also had signed up rappers Jooks and Sivas. When HideOut closed, MellemFingaMuzik started a collaboration with the newly formed label Grounded. They also teamed up with Benny Jamz and Gilli, from the B.O.C. collective, and all formed the common front and collective known as the Molotov Movement (now known as Molo).

MellemFingaMuzik released a self-titled EP, being a mix of songs previously released on YouTube, as well as two new tracks "Salute" and "Molotov".

== Members ==
In addition, both Stepz and Branco have released solo materials.

=== Branco ===
Benjamin Branco is a Danish musician and rapper. He released his album Baba Business at the end of June 2019.

In 2020, Branco collaborated with Gilli in the duo Branco & Gilli with a chart topping album Euro Connection and the #1 chart topping single "La danza".

In 2021, Branco collaborated with Lukas Graham with a single No Evil.

He has also pursued a film career with a role as Branco in the 2017 Danish film Underverden (in English meaning Underworld). The film is directed by Fenar Ahmad and the English title was marketed as Darkland.

=== Stepz ===
Ibrahim Kucukavci known by the stage name Stepz released his album Stepzologi in September 2019. His single "Endnu" from the album featuring Gilli, Benny Jamz & Branco made it to #3 on the Hitlisten, the Danish Singles Chart. The album also contains collaborations with Benny Jamz, Sivas in two tracks and with Kesi.

In 2017, he also appeared in the Danish film Underverden (English title Darkland).

== Discography: MellemFingaMuzik ==
=== Albums ===
Title	Details	Peak chart positions
Title	Details	DEN
Militant mentalitet	Released: March 2015; Label: Sony Music / Grounded; Formats: Digital download, streaming	7

=== EPs ===
Title	Details	Peak chart positions
Title	Details	DEN
MellemFingaMuzik EP	Released: 2014; Label: Molotov Movement / Grounded; Formats: Digital download, streaming	–

=== Singles ===
Year	Title	Peak positions	Certification	Album
Year	Title	DEN	Certification	Album
2017	"Jackpot" (feat. Benny Jamz)	2		
2018	"La criminal"	6		
2018	"Farten"	15		
2018	"AMG"	6		
2018	"Jungle"	8		

=== Featured in ===
Year	Title	Peak positions	Certification	Album
Year	Title	DEN	Certification	Album
2015	"C'est la vie" (Gilli feat. MellemFingaMuzik)	1		
2016	"Bomaye" (Sleiman feat. Livid & MellemFingaMuzik)	1		Bomaye
2016	"Udenfor" (Molo feat. Benny Jamz, Gilli & MellemFingaMuzik)	30		
2016	"Nu" (Molo feat. Benny Jamz, Gilli & MellemFingaMuzik)	37		
2017	"Bølgen" (Molo featuring Benny Jamz, Gilli and MellemFingaMuzik)	5		
2017	"Skejsen" (Molo featuring Benny Jamz, Gilli and MellemFingaMuzik)	11		
2017	"Stilen lagt" (Molo featuring Benny Jamz, Gilli and MellemFingaMuzik)	4		
2018	"Sensei" (Sivas feat. MellemFingaMuzik)	17		Ultra
2020	"La Trompeta" (Camur feat. MellemFingaMuzik)	8		

== Discography: Branco ==
=== Albums ===
Title	Details	Peak chart positions
Title	Details	DEN
Baba Business	Released: June 2019; Label: Sony Music / Heritage; Formats: Digital download, streaming	1
Euro Connection	Released: February 2020; Credited to: Branco & Gilli; Label: Sony Music / Mxiii / Disco:wax; Formats: Digital download, streaming	1
Baba Business 2	Released: January 2021; Label: Sony Music / BMB; Formats: Digital download, streaming	1
10 Years	Released: September 2021; Label: Sony Music / BMB; Formats: Digital download, streaming	1
Baba Business 3	Released: 24 May 2024; Label: Warner Music; Formats: Digital download, streaming	1

=== Singles ===
Year	Title	Peak positions	Certification	Album
Year	Title	DEN	Certification	Album
2019	"Planer" (with Gilli)	3	IFPI DEN: Gold	
2019	"All In" (with Gilli)	4		
2019	"London Town" (with Gilli)	2		
2019	"Verden vender" (with Gilli)	1		
2020	"Back to Business" (with Gilli)	2		Euro Connection (Branco and Gilli)
2020	"La danza" (with Gilli)	1		Euro Connection (Branco and Gilli)
2020	"Napoli" (with Gilli)	4		Euro Connection (Branco and Gilli)
2020	"Get Money (Motivation Session)"	15		Non-album release
2020	"Ballin'" (feat. Kojo Funds)	9		Non-album release
2020	"Tempo"	7		Non-album release
2020	"Hundo"	1		Baba Business 2
2021	"Bando Bitch"	1		Baba Business 2
2021	"Nascar" (with Jamaika and Dree Low)	16		Non-album singles
2021	"Broke"	4		Non-album singles
2021	"No Warning" (with Icekiid)	11		Non-album singles
2021	"Istanbul" (featuring Stepz)	6		Non-album singles
2022	"Trend"	16		Non-album singles
2022	"Steppa' in"	6		Non-album singles
2022	"Blue Lagoon"	9		Non-album singles
2022	"Sexy Back"	11		Non-album singles
2022	"Todo o nada"	17		Non-album singles
2022	"Deebo"	21		Non-album singles
2022	"Chopmoney" (with Icekiid)	34		Non-album singles
2023	"Daglig dosis"	16		Non-album singles
2023	"Honeymoon" (with Node)	31		Non-album singles
2023	"Levende Legende" (featuring Vory)	26		Non-album singles
2023	"Forsvinder" (featuring Gobs)	4		Non-album singles
2024	"Fear Nobody"	39		Non-album singles
2024	"Do You Love Me?"	37		Non-album singles
2024	"Europa" (featuring Gobs)	4		

=== Featured in ===
Year	Title	Peak positions	Certification	Album
Year	Title	DEN	Certification	Album
2018	"Carnalismo" (Node featuring Branco and Gilli)	5		
2018	"Tranquillo" (Gilli feat. Branco)	1		
2018	"Chopper Tale" (A'Typisk featuring Branco and Gilli)	4		
2019	"Culo" (Gilli feat. Branco)	4	IFPI DEN: Platinum	
2019	"100" (Gilli feat. Benny Jamz, Branco & Kesi)	25		
2019	"Selv" (Gilli feat. Benny Jamz & Branco)	32		
2020	"Moonlight" (Amina feat. Sivas & Branco)	16		
2021	"McQueen" (RH feat. Branco)	2		
2021	"Bodyguard" (Gobs feat. Branco)	15		
2021	"Komfortabelt" (RH feat. Branco)	6		
2022	"From Paris to Berlin" (Infernal feat. Branco and Jimilian)	6		

=== Other songs ===
Year	Title	Peak positions	Certification	Album
Year	Title	DEN	Certification	Album
2019	"Ingen introduktion (4x4)"	19		Baba Business
2019	"Frihed"	20		Baba Business
2019	"Go Fast"	25		Baba Business
2019	"Copenhagen"	26		Baba Business
2019	"Risiko"	27		Baba Business
2019	"Shotta"	28		Baba Business
2019	"La Zone"	31		Baba Business
2019	"Investere" (feat. Stepz, Gilli & Benny Jamz)	18		
2019	"Traficanté" (feat. Gilli & Benny Jamz)	22		
2020	"Mon cheri" (with Gilli featuring Amina)	18		Euro Connection (Branco and Gilli)
2020	"Murda" (with Gilli)	18		Euro Connection (Branco and Gilli)
2020	"Money Moves" (with Gilli)	27		Euro Connection (Branco and Gilli)
2020	"Believer" (with Gilli featuring Nafe Smallz)	34		Euro Connection (Branco and Gilli)
2020	"Eazy" (with Gilli)	35		Euro Connection (Branco and Gilli)
2020	"Intro" (with Gilli)	38		Euro Connection (Branco and Gilli)
2021	"Young and Dangerous"	14		Baba Business 2
2021	"Burna"	21		Baba Business 2
2021	"Feelings"	23		Baba Business 2
2021	"Back to Back"	29		Baba Business 2
2021	"Cruise Control"	32		Baba Business 2
2021	"Tax Free"	35		Baba Business 2
2021	"Banana (Freestyle)"	38		Baba Business 2
2021	"Honey (I'm Home)"	9		10 Years
2021	"Goal" (with Artigeardit and Lukas Graham)	18		10 Years
2021	"Siri" (featuring Sivas)	18		10 Years
2021	"Cosa Nostra"	38		10 Years
2021	"Hotboyz" (with Artigeardit)	26		10 Years
2021	"Koda" (with Icekiid)	21		10 Years
2024	"Den sidste intro"	35		Baba Business 3
2024	"Gennem årene"	40		Baba Business 3
2024	"Verden rundt"	18		Baba Business 3

== Discography: Stepz ==
=== Albums ===
Title	Details	Peak chart positions
Title	Details	DEN
Stepzologi	Released: September 2019; Label: Universal Music; Formats: Digital download, streaming	1
Stepzologi II	Released: November 2020; Label: Universal Music; Formats: Digital download, streaming	1
Dit liv dit valg	Released: 10 March 2023; Label: Universal Music; Formats: Digital download, streaming	1

=== Singles ===
Year	Title	Peak positions	Album
Year	Title	DEN	Album
2019	"Endnu" (feat. Gilli, Benny Jamz & Branco)	3	Stepzologi
2023	"Jet Li" (feat. Benny Jamz)	16	Dit liv dit valg
2023	"Fast Life" (with Gilli)	6	Non-album single

=== Featured in ===
Year	Title	Peak positions	Certification	Album
Year	Title	DEN	Certification	Album
2017	"De Snakker" (Node feat. Stepz)	2		
2018	"Cambiarme" (Node feat. Stepz)	33		Cambiarme
2018	"Nye Produkter" (Kesi feat. Benny Jamz, Stepz & Branco, K)	25		
2019	"Dem der ved det" (Carmon x Stepz)	26		
2019	"Stresser af" (Sivas feat. Stepz)	16		
2019	"Investere" (Branco feat. Stepz, Gilli & Benny Jamz)	18		
2019	"Tålmodighed" (Carmon feat. Stepz)	33		
2019	"Ra ta ta ta" (Node feat. Stepz)	27		Samme vej
2020	"Shopping" (Benny Jamz feat. Kesi & Stepz)	38		
2020	"Deadline" (Carmon feat. Stepz)	32		

=== Other songs ===
Year	Title	Peak positions	Certification	Album
Year	Title	DEN	Certification	Album
2019	"Cinco de Mayo"	10		Stepzologi
2019	"Samurai" (feat. Sivas)	16		Stepzologi
2019	"Panorama"	20		Stepzologi
2019	"Bebe"	26		Stepzologi
2019	"Cara mia" (feat. Sivas & Kesi)	34		Stepzologi
2019	"5 End 100"	35		Stepzologi
2019	"Terminal 3"	37		Stepzologi
2019	"Gimma min del" (feat. Benny Jamz)	40		Stepzologi
2020	"Ny dag"	17		
2020	"Guap"	17		
2020	"Moncler"	20		
2020	"Nix normal"	19		Stepzologi II
2020	"Cullinan"	28		Stepzologi II
2020	"Replay"	35		Stepzologi II
