= Gilli (rapper) =

Danish rapper & actor (born 1992)

- Also known as: Gilli
- Born: Kian Rosenberg Larsson; 27 June 1992 (age 34); Rødovre, Denmark
- Genre: Hip hop
- Occupations: Rapper; singer; songwriter
- Instrument: Vocals
- Years active: 2010–present
- Labels: disco:wax; Uropa / MXIII; ArtPeople

Branco & Gilli
- Origin: Denmark
- Genre: Rap
- Years active: 2020–present
- Label: MXIII / disco:wax / Sony Music
- Members: Branco; Gilli

Kian Rosenberg Larsson (born 27 June 1992), known professionally as Gilli, is a Danish rapper, singer, and songwriter from Rødovre, Capital Region. After initially growing out of the B.O.C. rap collective and releasing several singles between 2011 and 2013, also as a feature artist, Gilli rose to mainstream prominence in 2014 following the release of the musical drama film Ækte vare (2014), playing a fictionalized version of himself.

His hit songs "C'est la vie" in 2015, "Tidligt Op" in 2016, "Langsom" in 2017, "Tranquillo" in 2018, "Kolde nætter" in 2019 and "Verden vågner" in 2022 all reached the top of the Danish singles chart. Likewise, his debut studio album Kiko (2019) peaked at number one on the Danish Album Charts, with 13 of the album's 16 tracks reaching the singles charts; a record.

In February 2020, his collaborative album Euro Connection as Branco & Gilli (with Branco, a member of MellemFingaMuzik) became his second consecutive number-one album in Denmark. "La danza", the lead single from the album, made it to #1 on the Danish Singles Chart whereas "Back to Business" from the same album made it to #2 on the same chart.

== Career ==
Gilli started as part of the Danish underground and rap collective B.O.C. (also known variously as Bars of Crack, Bombs Over Copenhagen and Bomber Over Centrum) that consisted of the rapper and hip hop artists mostly from Nørrebro.

He had the lead role in Ækte vare, a film directed by Fenar Ahmad, in which he plays Mikael, a Danish kid who grows up in a housing project with mainly foreign immigrants. Along with a group of childhood friends Tariq, Samir and Eddy, Mikael is making music. His talent catches the eye of the established rapper Apollo, who makes Mikael his ghostwriter.

Gilli's musical commercial breakthrough came through the film and the release of the soundtrack of the film as an EP, Ækte vare. Released on 1 April 2014 on ArtPeople, the 33-minute EP featured MellemFingaMuzik, Murro, Kesi, Højer Øye and Sivas. It sold very well on Spotify and iTunes and reached number 8 on Hitlisten, the official Danish chart. The song "Knokler Hårdt" from the EP went platinum on stream in June 2014.

Gilli is known for various collaborations, notably with Kesi, Sivas, Kato, Medina, Højer Øye, Hasan Shah and MellemFingaMuzik. His single "C'est la vie" featuring MellemFingaMuzik reached number 1 on Tracklisten, the official Danish singles chart.

== Discography ==
=== Studio albums ===
Title	Details	Peak chart positions
Title	Details	DEN
Kiko	Released: 13 July 2019; Label: MXIII, disco:wax; Formats: Digital download, streaming	1
Euro Connection (with Branco)	Released: 5 February 2020; Label: MXIII, disco:wax; Formats: Digital download, streaming	1
Mere End Musik (with Benny Jamz and Kesi featuring B.O.C)	Released: 18 June 2021; Label: MXIII, disco:wax, Sony Music; Formats: Digital download, streaming	1
Carnival	Released: 13 January 2022; Label: Universal; Formats: Digital download, streaming	1
Suave World	Released: 15 October 2022; Label: Universal; Formats: Digital download, streaming	1
Kiko Club	Released: 2 November 2023; Label: Universal; Formats: Digital download, streaming	1
Kenny (with Benny Jamz)	Released: 21 June 2024; Label: MXIII / Universal; Formats: Digital download, streaming	1
Verden er din	Released: 18 September 2026; Label: MXIII / Universal; Formats: Digital download, streaming	1

=== Extended plays ===
Title	EP details	Peak chart positions	Notes
Title	EP details	DEN	Notes
Ækte vare	Released: 1 April 2014; Genre: Soundtrack of film Ækte vare aka Flow; Label: ArtPeople; Formats: CD, digital download	8	Tracklist: 1. "Grå Dage" (feat. Murro) (2.40); 2. "Knokler Hårdt" (4.05); 3. "Ung Entreprenør" (feat. MellemFingaMuzik) (5:57); 4. "Hele Igennem" (feat. KESI & Højer Øye) (4:21); 5. "Hårde Tider" (feat. Højer Øye) (3:50); 6. "Penge Kommer Går" (3:41); 7. "Trykker Sedler" (feat. S!vas & MellemFingaMuzik) (5:23); 8. "Alt Jeg Har Set" (feat. Murro) (3:59)
Rene hjerter vinder altid	Released: 1 May 2025; Label: MXIII / Universal; Formats: Digital download, streaming	1	

=== Singles ===
==== As lead artist ====
Year	Title	Peak positions	Certification	Album
Year	Title	DEN	Certification	Album
2012	"Små børn"	34		
2012	"Lykkerig" (featuring Kimbo and Murro)	—		
2012	"Bagmand" (featuring Kimbo)	—		
2015	"Orale"	24		
2015	"C'est la vie" (featuring MellemFingaMuzik)	1		
2016	"Tidligt Op"	1		
2016	"Adios" (featuring Kesi)	20		
2016	"Helwa"	2		
2017	"La Varrio (El Barrio)"	4		
2017	"Habibi Aiwa"	2	IFPI DEN: Gold	
2017	"Rica" (featuring Kesi and Sivas)	2	IFPI DEN: Gold	
2017	"Langsom"	1	IFPI DEN: Platinum	
2018	"Tranquillo" (featuring Branco)	1		
2018	"Mon p'tit loup"	5		
2018	"Frero"	7		
2018	"Oui" (with Sivas and Node)	1	IFPI DEN: 2× Platinum	
2018	"Mi Lulu"	4		
2018	"Mama" (featuring Kesi)	6		
2019	"Kolde nætter"	1		
2019	"Planer" (with Branco)	3	IFPI DEN: Gold	
2019	"All In" (with Branco)	4		
2019	"Vai Amor"	1	IFPI DEN: 5× Platinum	Kiko
2019	"Langt væk"	9		Kiko
2019	"Culo" (featuring Branco)	4	IFPI DEN: Platinum	Kiko
2019	"Plata O Plomo" (with A Typisk)	18		
2019	"London Town" (with Branco)	2		
2019	"Verden vender" (with Branco)	1		Euro Connection
2020	"Back to Business" (with Branco)	2		Euro Connection
2020	"La danza" (with Branco)	1		Euro Connection
2020	"Napoli" (with Branco)	4		Euro Connection
2020	"L.U.V"	1		
2020	"Snik snak"	1		
2020	"3Style"	2		
2021	"Kærlighed"	1		
2022	"Europa Life" (with Benny Jamz)	9		
2022	"Verden vågner" (with Saveus)	1		Suave World
2023	"Spørgsmal" (with Stepz and Lamin)	3		
2023	"Skarpt lys"	1		Kiko Club
2023	"Du & jeg"	7		Kiko Club
2023	"555" (with Kesi)	1		Kiko Club
2024	"Sprite & Vodka" (with Noah Carter and Kesi)	6		
2024	"Robocop"	12	IFPI DEN: Gold	
2026	"Herinde" (featuring Hans Philip)	1		Verden er din

==== As featured artist ====
Year	Album	Peak positions	Album
Year	Album	DEN	Album
2012	"Gadehjørne" (Kesi featuring Gilli & Mass Ebdrup)	17	
2014	"Går i søvne" (Murro featuring Gilli)	37	
2014	"D.A.U.D.A." (Sivas featuring Gilli)	27	
2015	"Tyveri" (Hasan Shah featuring Gilli)	9	
2016	"Zebah" (Node featuring Gilli)	25	
2016	"Udenfor" (Molo featuring Benny Jamz, Gilli and MellemFingaMuzik)	30	
2016	"Nu" (Molo featuring Benny Jamz, Gilli and MellemFingaMuzik)	37	
2017	"Bølgen" (Molo featuring Benny Jamz, Gilli and MellemFingaMuzik)	5	
2017	"Skejsen" (Molo featuring Benny Jamz, Gilli and MellemFingaMuzik)	11	
2017	"Stilen lagt" (Molo featuring Benny Jamz, Gilli and MellemFingaMuzik)	4	
2018	"Carnalismo" (Node featuring Branco and Gilli)	5	
2018	"For mig selv" (Node featuring Gilli)	5	
2018	"Colombiana" (Sivas featuring Gilli)	4	
2018	"Holder Fast" (Hennedub featuring Gilli and Lukas Graham)	1	
2018	"Su Casa" (Kesi featuring Gilli)	1	
2018	"Chopper Tale" (A'typisk featuring Branco and Gilli)	4	
2019	"Investere" (Branco featuring Stepz, Gilli & Benny Jamz)	18	
2019	"Traficanté" (Branco featuring Gilli & Benny Jamez)	22	
2020	"Pas oublie" (Isaac Kasule featuring Gilli)	15	
2020	"Winter Season" (Amira featuring Gilli)	3	
2020	"Kiki" (Lolo featuring Gilli)	1	
2020	"Brobizz" (Gigis featuring Gilli)	26	
2026	"Marvel" (Cizzo featuring Gilli)	4	
2026	"Lighter" (Lord Siva featuring Gilli)	26	

=== Other charted songs ===
Year	Album	Peak positions	Album
Year	Album	DEN	Album
2019	"Løgn"	19	Kiko
2019	"Corazon"	23	Kiko
2019	"Dag 1"	28	Kiko
2019	"Ikke alene"	30	Kiko
2019	"Mama Rosa"	33	Kiko
2019	"100" (featuring Benny Jamz, Branco & Kesi)	25	Kiko
2019	"Selv" (featuring Benny Jamz & Branco)	32	Kiko
2020	"Mon cheri" (with Branco featuring Amina)	18	Euro Connection
2020	"Murda" (with Branco)	18	Euro Connection
2020	"Money Moves" (with Branco)	27	Euro Connection
2020	"Believer" (with Branco featuring Nafe Smallz)	34	Euro Connection
2020	"Eazy" (with Branco)	35	Euro Connection
2020	"Intro" (with Branco)	38	Euro Connection
2022	"Baianá"	4	Carnival
2022	"Peligrosa"	3	Carnival
2022	"No Pasa Nada"	10	Carnival
2022	"Kender ik' i morgen"	2	Carnival
2022	"Avantgarde"	13	Carnival
2022	"Miami Vicer"	8	Carnival
2022	"1 Sammen"	9	Carnival
2022	"Brazil" (featuring Prinsess Jorge)	22	Carnival
2022	"Bariostar"	23	Carnival
2022	"Ik' lige nu"	28	Carnival
2022	"Urørlig"	21	Carnival
2022	"Life"	19	Suave World
2022	"Money Dial"	12	Suave World
2022	"En gang til"	35	Suave World
2022	"Romario"	5	Suave World
2022	"Varmeste herinde"	27	Suave World
2022	"Du min" (with Benny Jamz and Kesi)	10	Suave World
2022	"Lad livet gå"	19	Suave World
2022	"Ligesom os"	38	Suave World
2022	"Paid"	4	Suave World
2022	"Lever nu" (with Benny Jamz and Kesi)	39	Suave World
2023	"Spinner" (featuring Makar)	18	Kiko Club
2023	"Chance"	24	Kiko Club
2023	"Vise dig vejen" (with Benny Jamz)	19	Kiko Club
2023	"Midnight Madness"	17	Kiko Club
2023	"Ingen som os" (with Benny Jamz and Kesi)	20	Kiko Club
2024	"Lad mig lande" (with Noah Carter, Kesi, Kimbo and Sivas)	33	Noahs Ark
2025	"Hvad vi har set"	13	Rene hjerter vinder altid
2025	"Rene hjerter"	2	Rene hjerter vinder altid
2025	"Bind for øjnene"	19	Rene hjerter vinder altid
2025	"Har ikke tænkt mig at blive"	26	Rene hjerter vinder altid
2025	"Tilbage"	3	Rene hjerter vinder altid
2025	"Ryggen mod muren" (with Lamin featuring Hans Philip)	9	Rene hjerter vinder altid
2026	"Monaco"	5	Verden er din
2026	"Cabaret"	8	Verden er din
2026	"Falder fra månen" (featuring D1ma)	2	Verden er din
2026	"El corte inglés"	13	Verden er din
2026	"En som dig"	15	Verden er din
2026	"Ik giv slip" (featuring Mille)	6	Verden er din
2026	"Lille hjerte"	7	Verden er din
2026	"10/5" (featuring Benny Jamz)	22	Verden er din
2026	"Casio" (featuring Noah Carter)	11	Verden er din
2026	"Verden er din freestyle" (featuring Guzo)	20	Verden er din
2026	"Vendin blæser"	16	Verden er din
2026	"Leve livet"	27	Verden er din
2026	"Lesgo" (featuring Kesi)	10	Verden er din
2026	"Sky Priority" (featuring Lamin)	21	Verden er din
2026	"Fina"	26	Verden er din
2026	"Aldrig igen"	35	Verden er din

More collaborations

- Kato – "Fuck hvor er det fedt (at være hiphop'er) (Part 2 G-Mix) (feat. Gilli, Clemens, Sivas m.fl.) (2011)
- Nik og Jay – "Gi mig dine tanker Pt. 2" (feat. Young, KESI, Kidd & Gilli) (2011)
- Rajin – "Farvel" (feat. Gilli) (2012)
- Kesi – "Gadehjørne" (feat. Gilli & Mass Ebdrup) (2012)
- Kesi – "Hygger mig" (feat. Gilli) (2013)
- Sivas – "d.a.u.d.a" (feat. Gilli) (2013)
- MellemFingaMuzik – "Gadepenge" (feat. Gilli) (2014)
- MellemFingaMuzik – "Chopped & Skruet" (feat. Gilli & Sivas) (2014)
- AMRO – "Korrupt" (feat. Gilli) (2014)
- Højer Øye – "Brænd System" (feat. Gilli) (2014)
- Medina – "Falske mennesker" (feat. Gilli) (2014)
- Sivas – "Hacket" (feat. Gilli & MellemFingaMuzik) (2014)
- Kesi – "Ik brug for" (feat. Højer Øye & Gilli) (2014)
- Murro – "Søvne" (feat. Gilli) (2015)
- MellemFingaMuzik – "Cocaina" (feat. Gilli) (2015)
- MellemFingaMuzik – "A.P. Møller" (feat. Gilli) (2015)
- MellemFingaMuzik – "Stik af" (feat. Gilli) (2015)
- MellemFingaMuzik – "Snakker" (feat. Gilli) (2015)
- MellemFingaMuzik – "Heromkring" (feat. Højer Øye & Gilli) (2015)
- MellemFingaMuzik – "Senere" (feat. Gilli) (2015)
- Gio – "Psykose" (feat. Gilli & Højer Øye) (2015)
- KESI – "Vors" (feat. Sivas, Gilli) (2015)
- KESI – "H.D.K." (feat. Mass Ebdrup & Gilli) (2015)
- Hasan Shah – "Tyveri" (feat. Gilli) (2015)

== Filmography ==
- 2014: Ækte vare – in lead role as Mikael (film directed by Fenar Ahmad)
