= Create Music Group =

American music distribution and publishing company

Create Music Group, Inc.
- Genre: Music publishing Media production
- Founded: 2015; 11 years ago
- Founder: Jonathan Strauss; Alexandre Williams
- Headquarters: Los Angeles, California, U.S.
- Area served: Worldwide
- Products: Client Portal
- Services: Music publishing; Digital distribution; Content creation; Music promotion; Data and analytics
- Subsidiaries: Label Engine; Flighthouse Media; Yoon Digital; Nirvana Digital; VRTCL; Broke Records; Music For Pets mau5trap !K7 Music; Monstercat; Cr2 Holdings Group; Disciple Records; Enhanced Music (50%)
- Website: createmusicgroup.com

Create Music Group, is an independent American record label, music distribution, publishing, and data analytics company founded in 2015 by Jonathan Strauss and Alexandre Williams. The company is headquartered in Los Angeles, California. The company provides music distribution, rights management and music publishing.

== History ==
=== Foundation years (2015-2018) ===
Create Music Group was founded in early 2015 by CEO Jonathan Strauss, COO Alexandre Williams, CBO Wayne Hampton. Strauss invested $1 million into the company and later raised a seed round of $2.25 million in exchange for a minority share. The company began by collecting unclaimed revenue for EDM and hip hop artists on YouTube. As of January 2019, Create Music Group monetizes approximately 9 billion streams a month.

In June 2016, Create acquired Label Engine, a label distributor founded in 2008 that Williams had previously worked for. Around the same time it went into its current name as Create Music Group while also handling distributions for clients such as Insomniac Records, YNW Melly and 6ix9ine. The company would later acquire the digital media brand Flighthouse.

=== Expansion and digital media (2018–2020) ===
In 2018, Create Music Group announced the launch of its music publishing division with the signing of 6ix9ine.

In 2020, Create Music Group was listed by Inc. Magazine at the top of their Inc. 5000 Series: California, as the fastest growing private company in the state, and also Inc. 5000, as the second fastest growing company in the United States.

Following the launch of their publishing division, Create Music Group distributed 6ix9ine's Dummy Boy album after the release was leaked. They also released "Gooba", 6ix9ine's first single after being released from prison. The label scored its first Billboard Hot 100 number one with 6ix9ine and Nicki Minaj's "Trollz".

=== Acquisitions and international expansion (2021–2023) ===
In the 2020s, Create Music Group executed a series of strategic acquisitions, beginning in late 2021 with Mumbai-based YouTube Enterprise partner Nirvana Digital. As part of this acquisition, Nirvana co-founder Manu Kaushish joined Create's executive team as president, India to lead expansion into India and international music markets. Create's expansion continued with the purchase of viral marketing agency VRTCL in mid-2022, the acquisition of Music For Pets in 2023, and a 50% stake in British-based electronic music label Enhanced Music in December 2024. Cinq Music Group sued Create Music Group for at least $200,000.

On February 16, 2023, final judgment was entered in favor of Create Music Group on the entirety of the case, and Cinq Music Group's claims were dismissed with prejudice. In May 2023, the court entered an amended final judgment awarding Create Music Group $55,278.13 in attorneys' fees and $638.71 in costs, for a total award of $55,916.84.

=== Financing and expansion (2024-2025) ===
In June 2024, Create raised $165 million in an investment round led by Flexpoint Ford at a reported valuation of $1 billion. In March 2026, the company completed a further financing round of approximately $450 million in equity and debt, giving it a reported valuation of $2.2 billion. The founders retained majority ownership following the transaction.

2025 also saw a large string of acquisitions made by the company starting with the discography of Canadian producer and DJ Deadmau5 and the catalogue of his record label, Mau5trap on March 4, !K7 Music in April 2025, the Canadian electronic music label Monstercat on May 6, and Cr2 Holdings Group in December 2025, bringing the UK-based dance label Cr2 Records, MBMB Publishing, and the music education platform Sample Tools by Cr2 under its ownership. As part of the acquisition, Cr2 founder Mark Brown remained with the company as president, while financial terms of the deal were not disclosed. The company has used the additional capital to expand its catalog, label and publishing activities. In November 2025, Create-backed Circuit Capital launched with more than $500 million in commitments to acquire music catalogs, labels and publishing assets, particularly in the electronic music sector. In 2025, it established partnerships with Pack Records, Star Trak Entertainment and EZMNY Records. The Star Trak agreement relaunched the label associated with producers Pharrell Williams and Chad Hugo, while the EZMNY agreement was formed with musician Ty Dolla $ign and executive Shawn Barron. In September 2025, Create signed singer Omarion to a record deal ahead of the planned B2K reunion tour. In April 2026, the company announced another joint venture, this time with Jonny Shipes' GoodTalk, extending its partnership model to another artist-development and label operation.

=== 2026-present ===
Create Music Group announced a $450 million capital and debt raise that valued the company at $2.2 billion in March.

In April 2026, rapper Nine Vicious released his third studio album, Emotions, under Create Music Group.

== Imprints ==
Create Music Group's roster of label imprints includes:

- !K7 Music
- Broke Records
- Disciple Records
- mau5trap
- Monstercat
- Nettwerk Music Group

== See also ==
- BMG Rights Management, a similar music group.
- PIAS Group, a similar independent music group that is a part of Universal Music.
- Virgin Music Group, a similar independent label distributor also owned by Universal Music.
