= Stepz =

- Born: Samuel Agyei
- Years active: 2021–present

Samuel Agyei, professionally known as Stepz, is a British rapper based in London. He rose to prominence in 2022 after his song "Cramp Dat" went viral on TikTok, earning him the title of TikTok's breakout artist of the summer. The track sampled Soulja Boy's song "Crank That (Soulja Boy)".

Agyei is also recognised for incorporating comedic skits into his music. In October 2024, he released the single "Rock", which gained widespread popularity on TikTok. A music video for the song was released on 21 November 2024. By 7 December 2024, "Rock" reached number one on the TikTok Billboard Top 50.

== Discography ==
=== Extended plays ===
| Title | Details |
|---|---|
| Step by Stepz | Released: 2023; Format: Digital download, streaming |

=== Singles ===
| Title | Year | Album |
|---|---|---|
| "Eureka" | 2021 | Non-album singles |
| "Cramp Dat" | 2022 | Non-album singles |
| "Pacman" (Fizzler with Stepz) | 2022 | Non-album singles |
| "LOL" (JTA with Stepz) | 2022 | Non-album singles |
| "Hot" (Stepz with Ivorian Doll) | 2023 | Non-album singles |
| "Oh No" | 2023 | Step by Stepz |
| "Book Bag" | 2023 | Step by Stepz |
| "Wine & Dine (Remix)" (Lando with Stepz, Private Zero, Kayem2x, and TFace) | 2024 | Non-album singles |
| "Righteous Yute" | 2024 | Non-album singles |
| "Rock" | 2024 | Non-album singles |
