= 6ix9ine discography =

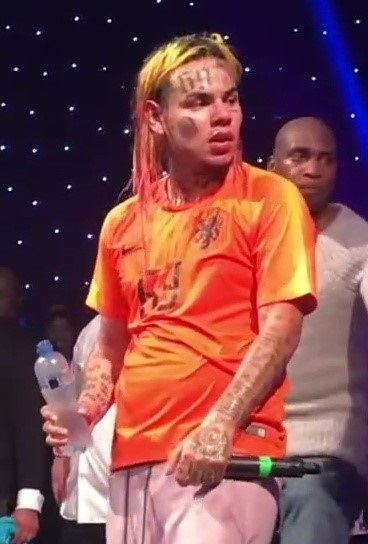
- 6ix9ine performing in June 2018
- Studio albums: 3
- EPs: 2
- Singles: 13
- Music videos: 29
- Mixtapes: 2

The discography of 6ix9ine, an American rapper, consists of three studio albums, three mixtapes, two extended plays, 29 music videos, and thirteen singles (including two as a featured artist). Nine of his singles have been certified platinum by the Recording Industry Association of America (RIAA) and two gold. His second mixtape, Day69 (2018), debuted at number four on the US Billboard 200 with 55,000 album-equivalent units, of which 20,000 were pure album sales. His debut studio album, Dummy Boy (2018), debuted at number two on the US Billboard 200 with 66,000 units, including 10,000 pure album sales.

== Albums ==
=== Studio albums ===
| Title | Details | Peak chart positions | | | | | | | | | | Sales | Certifications |
| Title | Details | US | AUT | CAN | DEN | FIN | NOR | NZ | SWE | SWI | UK | Sales | Certifications |
|---|---|---|---|---|---|---|---|---|---|---|---|---|---|
| Dummy Boy | Released: November 27, 2018; Label: ScumGang, 10K Projects, Create Music Group; Format: LP, digital download, streaming | 2 | 35 | 2 | 4 | 1 | 3 | 8 | 2 | 30 | 30 | US: 66,000 | RIAA: Platinum; BPI: Gold; IFPI DEN: Gold |
| TattleTales | Released: September 4, 2020; Label: ScumGang, Create Music Group; Format: CD, LP, digital download, streaming | 4 | 14 | 5 | 30 | 15 | 9 | 33 | 24 | 17 | 27 | US: 55,000 | |
| Leyenda Viva | Released: June 16, 2023; Label: La Corporación; Format: Digital download, streaming | — | — | — | — | — | — | — | — | — | — | | |
"—" denotes a recording that did not chart or was not released in that territory.

== Mixtapes ==
| Title | Details | Peak chart positions | | | | | | | | | | Sales | Certifications |
| Title | Details | US | AUS | CAN | DEN | GER | NOR | NZ | SWE | SWI | UK | Sales | Certifications |
|---|---|---|---|---|---|---|---|---|---|---|---|---|---|
| Tekashi69 | Released: March 24, 2017; Label: ScumGang; Format: Digital download, streaming | — | — | — | — | — | — | — | — | — | — | | |
| Day69 | Released: February 23, 2018; Label: ScumGang, Tr3yway, 10K Projects; Format: CD, LP, digital download, streaming | 4 | 11 | 5 | 26 | 44 | 14 | 15 | 15 | 20 | 20 | US: 79,000 | RIAA: Platinum; BPI: Silver; GLF: Gold; IFPI DEN: Gold; IFPI NOR: Gold; MC: Gold |
"—" denotes a recording that did not chart or was not released in that territory.

== Extended plays ==
| Title | Details |
|---|---|
| 69 Mixes | Released: May 18, 2015; Label: ScumGang; Format: Digital download, streaming |
| Blackballed | Released: January 12, 2024; Label: La Corporación; Format: Digital download, streaming |

== Singles ==
=== As lead artist ===
| Title | Year | Peak chart positions | | | | | | | | | | Certifications | Album |
| Title | Year | US | US R&B/ HH | AUS | AUT | CAN | DEN | NZ | SWE | SWI | UK | Certifications | Album |
|---|---|---|---|---|---|---|---|---|---|---|---|---|---|
| "Gummo" | 2017 | 12 | 5 | — | — | 32 | — | — | — | — | — | RIAA: 2× Platinum; BPI: Silver; MC: Platinum; RMNZ: Gold | Day69 |
| "Kooda" | 2017 | 50 | 29 | — | — | 58 | — | — | — | — | — | RIAA: Platinum; MC: Gold | Day69 |
| "Keke" (with Fetty Wap and A Boogie wit da Hoodie) | 2018 | 43 | 22 | — | — | 37 | — | — | — | — | — | RIAA: Platinum; BPI: Silver; MC: Gold; RMNZ: Gold | Day69 |
| "Gotti" | 2018 | 99 | 50 | — | — | 75 | — | — | — | — | 95 | BPI: Silver; RMNZ: Gold | Day69 |
| "Tati" (featuring DJ Spinking) | 2018 | 46 | 23 | — | — | 36 | — | — (Note: "Tati" did not enter the NZ Top 40 Singles Chart, but peaked at number eight on the NZ Heatseeker Singles Chart.) | — | — | 100 | RIAA: Platinum; MC: Gold; RMNZ: Gold | Dummy Boy |
| "Fefe" (featuring Nicki Minaj and Murda Beatz) | 2018 | 3 | 3 | 8 | 14 | 3 | 22 | 3 | 6 | 10 | 17 | RIAA: 5× Platinum; BPI: Gold; GLF: Platinum; IFPI DEN: Gold; IFPI NOR: Gold; MC: Platinum; RMNZ: 2× Platinum | Dummy Boy |
| "Bebe" (featuring Anuel AA) | 2018 | 30 | — | — | 75 | 25 | — | — (Note: "Bebe" did not enter the NZ Top 40 Singles Chart, but peaked at number 17 on the NZ Hot Singles Chart.) | 62 | 15 | 67 | RIAA: Platinum | Dummy Boy |
| "Stoopid" (featuring Bobby Shmurda) | 2018 | 25 | 15 | 63 | 48 | 22 | 40 | — (Note: "Stoopid" did not enter the NZ Top 40 Singles Chart, but peaked at number five on the NZ Hot Singles Chart.) | 25 | 28 | 34 | RIAA: Platinum | Dummy Boy |
| "Gooba" | 2020 | 3 | 2 | 14 | 3 | 2 | 9 | 13 | 5 | 2 | 6 | RIAA: Platinum; BPI: Silver; IFPI DEN: Gold; RMNZ: Platinum | TattleTales |
| "Trollz" (with Nicki Minaj) | 2020 | 1 | 1 | 45 | 8 | 4 | — | — (Note: "Trollz" did not enter the NZ Top 40 Singles Chart, but peaked at number 3 on the NZ Hot Singles Chart.) | 51 | 8 | 12 | RIAA: Platinum | TattleTales |
| "Yaya" | 2020 | 99 | — | — | 53 | 95 | — | — (Note: "Yaya" did not enter the NZ Top 40 Singles Chart, but peaked at number 35 on the NZ Hot Singles Chart.) | — | 46 | 87 | | TattleTales |
| "Punani" | 2020 | — (Note: "Punani" did not enter the Billboard Hot 100, but peaked at number 7 on the Bubbling Under Hot 100 chart.) | — | — | — | — | — | — (Note: "Punani" did not enter the NZ Top 40 Singles Chart, but peaked at number 18 on the NZ Hot Singles Chart.) | — | 84 | — | | TattleTales |
| "Zaza" | 2021 | 90 | 37 | — | — | 91 | — | — (Note: "Zaza" did not enter the NZ Top 40 Singles Chart, but peaked at number 30 on the NZ Hot Singles Chart.) | — | — | — | | Non-album singles |
| "Giné" | 2022 | 83 | 26 | — | — | 80 | — | — (Note: "Giné" did not enter the NZ Top 40 Singles Chart, but peaked at number 23 on the NZ Hot Singles Chart.) | — | — | — | | Non-album singles |
| "Bori" (with Lenier) | 2023 | — | — | — | — | — | — | — | — | — | — | | Leyenda Viva |
| "Wapae" (with Ángel Dior and Lenier featuring Bullin 47) | 2023 | — | — | — | — | — | — | — | — | — | — | | Leyenda Viva |
| "Y Ahora" (with Grupo Firme) | 2023 | — | — | — | — | — | — | — | — | — | — | RIAA: Platinum | Leyenda Viva |
| "Pa Ti" (with Yailin La Más Viral) | 2023 | — | — | — | — | — | — | — | — | — | — | | Leyenda Viva |
| "Dueño" (with Lenier) | 2023 | — | — | — | — | — | — | — | — | — | — | | Leyenda Viva |
| "Shaka Laka" (with Yailin La Más Viral featuring Kodak Black) | 2023 | — (Note: "Shaka Laka" did not enter the Billboard Hot 100, but peaked at number 17 on the Bubbling Under Hot 100 chart.) | 34 | — | — | — | — | — (Note: "Shaka Laka" did not enter the NZ Top 40 Singles Chart, but peaked at number 34 on the NZ Hot Singles Chart.) | — | — | — | | Non-album singles |
| "Coco" (with Yailin La Más Viral) | 2024 | — | — | — | — | — | — | — | — | — | — | | Non-album singles |
| "Wassup" | 2024 | — | — | — | — | — | — | — | — | — | — | | Non-album singles |
| "La Baby" (with La Perversa) | 2024 | — | — | — | — | — | — | — | — | — | — | | Non-album singles |
| "Respuesta" (with Lenier) | 2024 | — | — | — | — | — | — | — | — | — | — | | Non-album singles |
| "Papita Frita" (with Bebeshito and Lenier) | 2024 | — | — | — | — | — | — | — | — | — | — | RIAA: 2× Platinum | Non-album singles |
| "Poppa" | 2025 | — | — | — | — | — | — | — | — | — | — | | Non-album singles |
| "Hanna" | 2025 | — | — | — | — | — | — | — | — | — | — | | Non-album singles |
"—" denotes a recording that did not chart or was not released in that territory.

=== As featured artist ===
| Title | Year | Peak chart positions | | | | | | | | | | Certification | Album |
| Title | Year | US | AUT | CAN | DEN | FRA | GER | NZ Hot | RUS Stream. | SWI | UK | Certification | Album |
|---|---|---|---|---|---|---|---|---|---|---|---|---|---|
| "Poles 1469" (Trippie Redd featuring 6ix9ine) | 2017 | — (Note: "Poles 1469" did not enter the Billboard Hot 100, but peaked at number 8 on the Bubbling Under Hot 100 chart.) | — | — | — | — | — | — | * | — | — | RIAA: Platinum; RMNZ: Gold | A Love Letter to You |
| "Zkittlez" (Gringo featuring 6ix9ine) | 2018 | — | 18 | — | — | — | 6 | — | * | 29 | — | | Alle Freunde Fett |
| "Get the Strap" (Uncle Murda featuring Casanova, 6ix9ine, and 50 Cent) | 2018 | — (Note: "Get the Strap" did not enter the Billboard Hot 100, but peaked at number 24 on the Bubbling Under Hot 100 chart.) | — | — | — | — | — | — | * | — | — | | Non-album singles |
| "Aulos Reloaded" (Vladimir Cauchemar featuring 6ix9ine) | 2018 | — | — | — | — | — | — | — | * | — | — | | Non-album singles |
| "Kick" (Jimilian featuring 6ix9ine) | 2018 | — | — | — | 2 | — | — | 39 | * | — | — | IFPI DEN: Gold | Non-album singles |
| "Bozoo" (Rarri featuring 6ix9ine) | 2018 | — | — | — | — | — | — | — | * | — | — | | Non-album singles |
| "Swervin" (A Boogie wit da Hoodie featuring 6ix9ine) | 2019 | 38 | — | 24 | — | — | 73 | 21 | * | 95 | 27 | RIAA: 6× Platinum; BPI: Platinum; IFPI DEN: Platinum; MC: 8× Platinum; RMNZ: 2× Platinum | Hoodie SZN |
| "Bloody" (Lacrim featuring 6ix9ine) | 2019 | — | — | — | — | 11 | — | — | * | — | — | | Lacrim |
| "Case 19" (Jasiah featuring 6ix9ine) | 2019 | — | — | — | — | — | — | — | * | — | — | | Jasiah I Am |
| "Tsunami" (Joe Young featuring 6ix9ine, Gucci Mane, and Mike Rebel) | 2019 | — | — | — | — | — | — | — | * | — | — | | Non-album singles |
| "Para" (Massaka featuring 6ix9ine) | 2021 | — | — | — | — | — | — | — | * | — | — | | Non-album singles |
| "Feefafo" (Yailin La Más Viral featuring Ben El and 6ix9ine) | 2023 | — | — | — | — | — | — | — | * | — | — | | Non-album singles |
| "Buratino" (Margo featuring 6ix9ine) | 2025 | — | — | — | — | — | — | — | 51 | — | — | | Non-album singles |
"—" denotes a recording that did not chart or was not released in that territory. "*" denotes that the chart did not exist at that time.

== Other charted songs ==
| Title | Year | Peak chart positions | | | | | | | | | | Certifications | Album |
| Title | Year | US | ARG | AUS | CAN | IRE | NLD | NZ | SWE | SWI | UK | Certifications | Album |
|---|---|---|---|---|---|---|---|---|---|---|---|---|---|
| "Billy" | 2018 | 50 | — | — | 38 | — | 98 | — (Note: "Billy" did not enter the NZ Top 40 Singles Chart or Hot Singles Chart, but peaked at number four on the NZ Heatseeker Singles Chart.) | — (Note: "Billy" did not enter the Swedish Singellista Chart, but peaked at number one on the Swedish Heatseeker Chart.) | 93 | — | RIAA: 2× Platinum; BPI: Silver; GLF: Gold; IFPI DEN: Gold; IFPI NOR: Gold; MC Gold; RMNZ: Platinum | Day69 |
| "Rondo" (featuring Tory Lanez and Young Thug) | 2018 | 73 | — | — | 53 | — | — (Note: "Rondo" did not enter the NZ Top 40 Singles Chart, but peaked at number eight on the NZ Heatseeker Singles Chart.) | — | — | — | — | RIAA: Gold | Day69 |
| "Tic Toc" (featuring Lil Baby) | 2018 | 53 | — | — | 22 | 28 | 48 | — (Note: "Tic Toc" did not enter the NZ Top 40 Singles Chart, but peaked at number six on the NZ Hot Singles Chart.) | 33 | 28 | 43 | RIAA: Gold | Dummy Boy |
| "Kika" (featuring Tory Lanez) | 2018 | 44 | — | 30 | 13 | 24 | 25 | 27 | 28 | 13 | — | RIAA: Platinum; BPI: Gold; RMNZ: Gold | Dummy Boy |
| "Mama" (featuring Nicki Minaj and Kanye West) | 2018 | 43 | — | 22 | 16 | 29 | 63 | 29 | 57 | 23 | 29 | RIAA: Gold | Dummy Boy |
| "Waka" (featuring A Boogie wit da Hoodie) | 2018 | 51 | — | — | 21 | — | 100 | — (Note: "Waka" did not enter the NZ Top 40 Singles Chart, but peaked at number 13 on the NZ Hot Singles Chart.) | 61 | — | — | RIAA: Gold | Dummy Boy |
| "Mala" (featuring Anuel AA) | 2018 | — (Note: "Mala" did not enter the Billboard Hot 100, but peaked at number 20 on the Bubbling Under Hot 100 chart.) | 59 | — | — | — | — | — | — | 80 | — | | Dummy Boy |
| "Kanga" (featuring Kanye West) | 2018 | — (Note: "Kanga" did not enter the Billboard Hot 100, but peaked at number seven on the Bubbling Under Hot 100 chart.) | — | — | 76 | — | — | — | — | — | — | | Dummy Boy |
| "Feefa" (featuring Gunna) | 2018 | — (Note: "Feefa" did not enter the Billboard Hot 100, but peaked at number 10 on the Bubbling Under Hot 100 chart.) | — | — | 100 | — | — | — | — | — | — | | Dummy Boy |
| "Locked Up Pt. 2" (with Akon) | 2020 | — | — | — | — | — | — | — (Note: "Locked Up Pt. 2" did not enter the NZ Top 40 Singles Chart, but peaked at number 18 on the NZ Hot Singles Chart.) | — | — | — | | TattleTales |
| "Tutu" | 2020 | — (Note: "Tutu" did not enter the Billboard Hot 100, but peaked at number one on the Bubbling Under Hot 100 chart.) | — | — | 100 | — | — | — (Note: "Tutu" did not enter the NZ Top 40 Singles Chart, but peaked at number 35 on the NZ Hot Singles Chart.) | — | — | — | | TattleTales |
"—" denotes a recording that did not chart or was not released in that territory.

== Music videos ==
=== As lead artist ===
List of music videos as lead artist, showing year released and directors
| Title | Year | Director(s) |
|---|---|---|
| "69" | 2014 | Slick Jackson |
| "Pimpin'" | 2014 | Slick Jackson |
| "4769" | 2014 | Slick Jackson |
| "ScumLife" | 2015 | TrifeDrew |
| "Shinigami" (with Bodega Bamz) | 2015 | TrifeDrew |
| "Inferno" | 2015 | TrifeDrew |
| "Yokai" (with ZillaKami) | 2016 | CamGotHits |
| "Hellsing Station" (with ZillaKami) | 2016 | Hikari-Ultra |
| "Sinaloa" | 2016 | TrifeDrew |
| "Exodia" (with J Stash and Xen Black) | 2017 | TrifeDrew |
| "Jaguare" (featuring Dalyb, Zayo, and Lvcas Dope) | 2017 | TrifeDrew |
| "Zeta Zero 0.5" (featuring Famous Dex, Schlosser, and Dalyb) | 2017 | TrifeDrew |
| "Gummo" | 2017 | TrifeDrew |
| "Kooda" | 2017 | TrifeDrew |
| "Keke" (with Fetty Wap and A Boogie wit da Hoodie) | 2018 | TrifeDrew & William Asher |
| "Billy" | 2018 | TrifeDrew & William Asher |
| "Gotti" | 2018 | TrifeDrew & William Asher |
| "Tati" (featuring DJ Spinking) | 2018 | TrifeDrew |
| "Fefe" (featuring Nicki Minaj and Murda Beatz) | 2018 | TrifeDrew & William Asher |
| "Bebe" (featuring Anuel AA) | 2018 | TrifeDrew, William Asher & Just4canon |
| "International Gangstas" (with Farid Bang and Capo featuring SCH) | 2018 | Bilal Hadzic & Mo7art |
| "Aulos Reloaded" (with Vladimir Cauchemar) | 2018 | Vladimir Baranovsky |
| "Stoopid" (featuring Bobby Shmurda) | 2018 | TrifeDrew, William Asher & Just4canon |
| "Gooba" | 2020 | Just4canon/CanonF8, David Wept & 6ix9ine |
| "Trollz" (with Nicki Minaj) | 2020 | Just4canon/CanonF8, David Wept & 6ix9ine |
| "Yaya" | 2020 | Just4canon/CanonF8, David Wept & 6ix9ine |
| "Punani" | 2020 | Just4canon/CanonF8 & 6ix9ine |
| "Tutu" | 2020 | Just4canon/CanonF8 & 6ix9ine |
| "Zaza" | 2021 | Just4canon/CanonF8 & 6ix9ine |
| "Giné" | 2022 | —N/a |

=== As featured artist ===
List of music videos as featured artist, showing year released and directors
| Title | Year | Director(s) |
|---|---|---|
| "Owee" (Trippie Redd featuring 6ix9ine and UnoTheActivist) | 2017 | Figure Eight Films |
| "Gigi (Zkittlez)" (Gringo featuring 6ix9ine) | 2018 | Fati.tv |
| "Get the Strap" (Uncle Murda featuring Casanova, 6ix9ine, and 50 Cent) | 2018 | Eif Rivera |
