= Lenier =

- Born: Álbaro Lenier Mesa; Güines, Cuba
- Genres: Latin ballad; Salsa; Reggaeton; Latin Pop
- Occupation: Singer
- Instrument: Guitar
- Label: Mr. 305 Inc.

Álbaro Lenier Mesa (born Cuba, Güines), better known by his stage name Lenier, is a Cuban singer. In 2022 he was mentioned on the Latin Grammy Awards in the category "Best Tropical Song ("Mala" coll. with Marc Anthony) " In 2023, he participated in 3 songs on the third studio album, Leyenda Viva, by American rapper 6ix9ine. He has collaborated with singers: 6ix9ine, Pitbull, Tito El Bambino, Yandel, Farruko, Jowell & Randy.

== Music career ==
In August 2018, Lenier released the single "Te Toqué Sin Querer" with Diana Fuentes, an audiovisual video that obtained more than 20 million views on YouTube. In April 2019, in collaboration with Álvaro Torres, he released the single "Me Extrañarás", it obtained 15 million views on YouTube.

In 2020, Lenier signed to the Mr. 305 record label, where he released her debut single ''Como Te Pago'', which went platinum and garnered over 100 million views on YouTube. In March 2023 Mesa, he participated in the studio album, Leyenda Viva by 6ix9ine in the singles "Bori", "Dueño", "Papa", "Wapae".

== Early life ==
Lenier, at the age of 15, emigrated to the city of Miami with his father, where he remained for 18 years making rural music and became part of the television program Clave Guajira that is broadcast on several television channels in the US. Later, he ventured into urban music. Lenier Mesa has a basic knowledge of the guitar. Peasant music helped him compose his own songs.

Lenier married his current Cuban romantic partner, Yosleny, in a ceremony held in the city of Miami.

== Awards and nominations ==
Award	Year	Category	Result
Premios Grammy Latinos	2022	Mejor Canción Tropical	Won
