= Billy (6ix9ine song) =

Song by 6ix9ine

from the album Day69
- Released: February 23, 2018
- Recorded: 2017
- Length: 1:52
- Label: ScumGang; 10K
- Songwriters: Daniel Hernandez; Omar Gomez
- Producer: Beat Menace

Music video
- "Billy" on YouTube

"Billy" is a song recorded by American rapper 6ix9ine for his second commercial mixtape, Day69 (2018). It was written by 6ix9ine with producer Beat Menace, and features additional vocals from 6ix9ine's then-manager Shotti. It was released on February 23, 2018, by ScumGang Records and 10K Projects, as the opening track from Day69.

== Critical reception ==
The song received mostly positive reviews from music critics. Charles Aaron of Rolling Stone called the song a "gruffly barked speaker assault". Daniel Offner of Salute Magazine described the song as a "heavy-hitting hardcore anthem with all the ruthlessness of M.O.P. or Capone-N-Noreaga with a modern trap core". Trent Clark of HipHopDX described the song as "personified terror".

== Music video ==
The music video was filmed by Trife Drew and released on March 4, 2018. During filming, the New York Police Department decided to remove 6ix9ine from the scene as a safety precaution for both the artist and surrounding bystanders.

== Charts ==
Chart (2018)	Peak position
Canada Hot 100 (Billboard)	38
Netherlands (Single Top 100)	98
New Zealand Heatseekers (RMNZ)	4
Sweden Heatseeker (Sverigetopplistan)	1
Switzerland (Schweizer Hitparade)	93
US Billboard Hot 100	50
US Hot R&B/Hip-Hop Songs (Billboard)	24

== Certifications ==
Region	Certification	Certified units/sales
Canada (Music Canada)	Gold	40,000^{‡}
Denmark (IFPI Danmark)	Gold	45,000^{‡}
New Zealand (RMNZ)	Platinum	30,000^{‡}
Norway (IFPI Norway)	Gold	30,000^{‡}
United Kingdom (BPI)	Silver	200,000^{‡}
United States (RIAA)	2× Platinum	2,000,000^{‡}
Streaming
Sweden (GLF)	Gold	4,000,000^{†}
^{‡} Sales+streaming figures based on certification alone.^{†} Streaming-only figures based on certification alone.
