= Rico Recklezz =

American rapper (born c.1992)

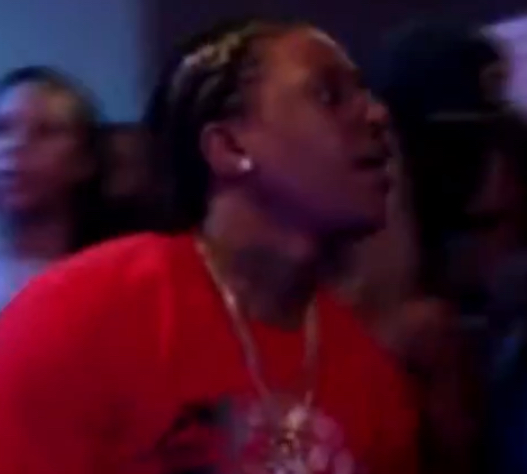
- Rico Recklezz in 2017

Background information
- Born: Ronnie Ramsey c. 1992 (age 33–34); Chicago, Illinois, U.S.
- Genres: Midwestern hip-hop; drill; gangsta rap; trap; comedy rap
- Instrument: Vocals
- Years active: 2011–present

Ronnie Ramsey (born c. 1992), better known by his stage name Rico Recklezz, is an American rapper.

== Life and career ==
Ramsey was born c. 1992 in South Side, Chicago, Illinois. He grew up listening to Bump J, Eazy-E, Eminem, Gucci Mane, Lil Wayne, Waka Flocka Flame and Yo Gotti. He joined a gang at age 10.

In November 2016, Ramsey released "No Talking", a diss track targeted at Soulja Boy, which used the same beat as "Crank That (Soulja Boy)". Soulja Boy allegedly put a US$100,000 price for the contract killing of Ramsey after he defended Lil Yachty. In December, he released the mixtape Get It in Blood, a collaboration with Ewol Samo.

In December 2017, Ramsey released the 15-song mixtape Big Recklezz. It contained one feature from rapper C-row.

In February 2018, Ramsey released a remix to 6ix9ine's "Gummo". He later pitched himself to be a member of the 2018 XXL Freshmen Class.

== Personal life ==
In 2020, Ramsey was arrested on gun possession charges and sentenced to 3 years in prison at Stateville Correctional Center. He was released in February 2024.

In December 2024, he began dating singer Summer Walker. On May 8, 2025, she announced they broke up.

== Discography ==
- Koolin n Hell 2 (2023)
- GET IT IN BLOOD (2023)
- Everybody Hates Recklezz (2023)
- Temerario (2023)
- Flattz & Gunz 2 (2020)
- Rico Don' Shoot Em 3
- Gunsmoke (2019)
- Kushsmoke (2019)
- Grand Theft Auto 6 (2017)
- Big Recklezz (2017)
- Rico Dont Shoot Em 2 Back from Hell
