= StupidGenius =

American hip hop group

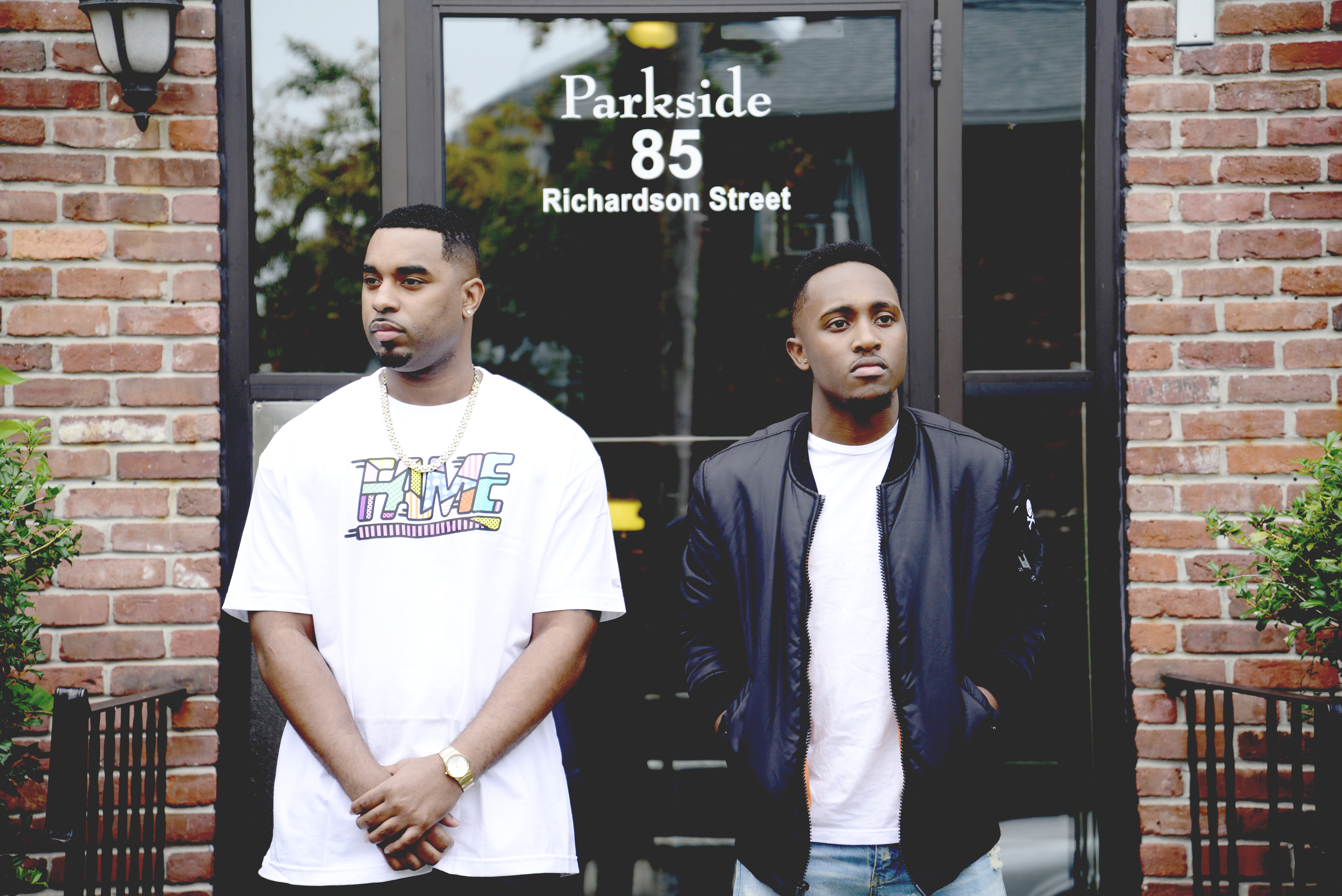

Background information
- Origin: Lowell, Massachusetts, United States
- Genres: Hip hop
- Years active: 2012−present
- Members: Lil Rich; Chaz King
- Website: wearestupidgenius.com

StupidGenius is an American hip hop duo composed of two cousins, Chaz King (born January 3, 1990) and Lil Rich (born July 28, 1994), from Lowell, Massachusetts. The group is mainly known from their self-released single titled "Clean" featuring Interscope Records recording artist Tory Lanez. The duo's name, an oxymoron, was derived from what they call their lifestyle, "staying down to earth but at the same time trying to be great" and also continuing to "try new things".

== Career ==
=== Background (2008–present) ===
The duo had been working together for several years prior to starting StupidGenius with the name YIC ("Youngest in Charge"), making music from out of each other's households starting out in 2008. Around late 2010, they took up producing and started to make music for themselves, creating a local buzz through word of mouth and the internet as well. In fall 2012, they would both attended the technical school CDIA (Centerfor Digital Imaging Arts), which was branched from Boston University; they both majored in audio engineering and would go on to graduate in the summer of 2014. Between the time of them going to school, StupidGenius continued to release music to maintain local relevance, with both working on solo projects helping each other out through 2013 and 2014. In the fall of 2014, they released the visuals to the first song from their self-titled mixtape, titled Pull Up, which debuted on WorldStarHipHop. Singles from the group debut would surface on HotNewHipHop before the mixtape actually released. In 2015, the duo received more acknowledgement due to releasing the single "Clean" with Tory Lanez, which debuted on The Fader; a follow-up solo effort titled "Meditate" was also debuted on The Fader. StupidGenius' song "Ocean Drive" featuring Boston artist Cousin Stizz also gained attention, and was premiered via Complex.

== Discography ==
=== Mixtapes ===
List of mixtapes, with selected details
Title	Details
StupidGenius: The Mixtape	Released: February 22, 2015; Label: Self-released; Format: Digital download
Gamechangers	Released: January 24, 2016; Label: Self-released; Format: Digital download
Safe Tripz	Released: March 28, 2017; Label: Self-released; Format: Digital download
Sincerely, for Jalen	Released: April 6, 2018; Label: Self-released; Format: Digital download
