= Fefe (song) =

2018 single by 6ix9ine, Nicki Minaj and Murda Beatz

Single by 6ix9ine, Nicki Minaj and Murda Beatz

from the album Dummy Boy and Queen (only for streaming platforms)
- Released: July 22, 2018
- Recorded: 2017–2018
- Genre: Dirty rap
- Length: 2:59
- Label: ScumGang; TenThousand Projects
- Songwriters: Daniel Hernandez; Onika Maraj; Shane Lindstrom; Kevin Gomringer; Tim Gomringer; Andrew Green
- Producers: Murda Beatz; Cubeatz

6ix9ine singles chronology
"Tati" (2018)	"Fefe" (2018)	"Bebe" (2018)

Nicki Minaj singles chronology
"Boo'd Up" (remix) (2018)	"Fefe" (2018)	"Barbie Dreams" (2018)

Murda Beatz singles chronology
"Articuno" (2018)	"Fefe" (2018)

Music video
- "Fefe" on YouTube

"Fefe" (stylized in all caps) is a single by American rappers 6ix9ine and Nicki Minaj, and Canadian record producer Murda Beatz; the latter producing it with Cubeatz. Written alongside Andrew Green, it was released on July 22, 2018, through TenThousand Projects. The song served as the second single from 6ix9ine's debut album, Dummy Boy (2018). Minaj also included the song on streaming versions of her fourth album, Queen (2018).

Commercially, the song reached number three on the Billboard Hot 100. It was certified 5× platinum by the Recording Industry Association of America. Internationally, "Fefe" reached the top ten in Australia, Canada, Hungary, New Zealand, Sweden, and Switzerland.

== Background and release ==
A track with the title "Fefe" leaked in snippet prior to the song's official release. During his European tour in June 2018, 6ix9ine revealed that he planned to release the song featuring a surprise guest, when he returned to the United States. "I got a really cool feature on it. It's a surprise," he said. On July 18, he shared on Instagram a lo-fi audio clip of the song, with the caption, "Subscribe before Sunday." A verse from it made some listeners advance that it would possibly feature Nicki Minaj.

On July 20, he announced that the track would be released two days later, and said, "Watch this shit go 8 for 8 on Billboard." On July 22, the song was officially released as a single for download. On July 24, 6ix9ine claimed that he will donate a portion of sales from the single to New York youth programs. The track was included as a bonus track on Minaj's fourth studio album Queen (2018). The "Fefe" cover art features a 3D cartoon artwork that shows 6ix9ine and Minaj sharing an ice cream cone (which is recreated in the music video). Minaj's cartoon is dressed in a G-string.

== Composition and lyrics ==
"Fefe" was both composed and produced by Murda Beatz and duo Cubeatz, consisting of Kevin and Tim Gomringer, while its lyrics were written by Andrew Green, 6ix9ine, and Minaj. The track is two minutes and fifty-nine seconds long. Minaj explained the making of the song saying, "6ix9ine sent me this song & we got on the phone to discuss. 5 mins after the call I sent him this voice note. True story. He sent me a voice note back making fun of my voice. I was literally in bed half sleep! [...] I was inspired because it reminded me of a song I did with Gucci years ago." The cadence used by both rappers in the song was noted to be similar to Valee's feature verse on Z Money's song "Two 16's" (2017), with 6ix9ine particularly seeming to stray from his usual aggressive rapping style to a calm, more melodic autotuned flow. Lyrically, the song features 6ix9ine boasting about his street cred, while Minaj is bragging about her jewelry, fashion, and sexual prowess. The latter namechecks rapper ASAP Rocky, television personality Khloé Kardashian, and singer-songwriter Tinashe.

== Reception ==
=== Critical reception ===
Critical reception was sharply divided. In Noisey, Kristin Corry expressed discomfort about the song, "not because of who the two polarizing rappers happened to be but because of the imagery," referring to 6ix9ine's sexual misconduct case involving a minor while the song's visuals and cover art are childlike. Nylon's Taylor Bryan added the collaboration to Minaj's list of controversies during 2018, writing "if 2017 was the year of questioning Katy Perry, 2018 is the year of questioning Nicki Minaj." In a positive review, Peter A. Berry of XXL said its beat "serves as an appropriate audio canvas for the song", with 6ix9ine's rap "showcasing a much gentler delivery than the one he used on tracks like "Gummo" and "Keke". He concluded that "with some authentic NYC confidence and a memorable hook, "Fefe" is definitely a slapper". Time considered "Fefe" as the second worst song of 2018.

=== Industry response ===
Justin Credible of Power 106 radio station announced on air on July 23, 2018, that he refuses to play 6ix9ine's verse on "Fefe", attributing his decision to the latter disrespecting Los Angeles. He remained willing to play Minaj's verse. In response to criticism, Nicki Minaj pointed to Lady Gaga's collaborative work with R. Kelly when justifying her friendship and collaboration with 6ix9ine. Minaj highlighted how the very same publication had praised Lady Gaga's 2013 collaboration with R. Kelly on the single "Do What U Want," despite Kelly's public allegations of child pornography. In a review, contributor Jordan Sargent had described the song as "deliciously slinky" and a "runaway hit", while Pitchfork news director Amy Phillips listed "Do What U Want" as one of her top three favorite tracks of 2013. Minaj called the move bullying and claimed that this demonstrated a double standard within the music industry. After numerous requests, Nicki Minaj later on deleted her tweets. Conversely, American singer Tinashe and television personality Khloé Kardashian expressed their excitement about being name checked on the track on their social media pages.

== Commercial performance ==
In the United States, "Fefe" launched on the Billboard Hot 100 at number four with 24,000 copies sold and 45.7 million streams during its first week. The following week, it ascended to number three. It became 6ix9ine's highest-charting single at the time by succeeding the peak of "Gummo" at number 12, and marked Minaj's seventeenth top ten entry on the chart, extending her record for the most among female rappers. The single was initially certified octuple platinum by the Recording Industry Association of America in 2019 before being downgraded to quintuple platinum in 2025.

Internationally, "Fefe" also reached the top ten in Australia, Canada, Hungary, New Zealand, Sweden, and Switzerland as well as the top twenty in Austria, France, Germany, the Netherlands, Norway, Portugal, and the United Kingdom.

== Music video ==
=== Background and release ===
6ix9ine and Minaj playing pattycake in the music video. The childlike visuals have been criticized due to 6ix9ine's previous criminal charges related to sexual activity with a child.

6ix9ine has shared during his European tour in June 2018, that he planned to release a music video for the song when he returns to the United States. After teasing the song on July 19, he wrote in a separate post, "I'm giving you guys one last music video this Sunday before I go to jail forever," referencing his legal troubles during that period. The same day, TMZ reported that 6ix9ine rush-ordered a new My Little Pony chain in order to wear it during a scheduled video shoot with Minaj. The music video was released through YouTube on July 22, a few hours after the song's release. It was directed by TrifeDrew and William Asher of Figure Eight Creative Group, with additional direction from 6ix9ine. It features toddler-sized lollipops and SUPERINFLATED balloon art.

The music video amassed more than 32 million views in its first three days online, and more than 70 million views in less than a week. A vertical music video for the song was subsequently released on Spotify.

=== Synopsis ===
The music video opens with 6ix9ine and Minaj playing a clapping game on a balloon-filled set. 6ix9ine then raps his verse laced in a cheetah print top and pink camouflage shorts, while Murda Beatz makes a cameo appearance holding two heavy-duty water guns. Minaj reintroduces herself shortly after for an extended cameo, rapping two verses and shouting out 6ix9ine's Treyway gang. The couple sits face-to-face once again and share an ice-cream cone with their arms interlocked (recreating the single artwork.) According to Peter A. Berry of XXL, the music video "looks sort of like a Willy Wonka’s chocolate factory".

== Controversy ==
Nicki Minaj received backlash for her choice to collaborate with Tekashi 6ix9ine. That year, the controversial rapper had pleaded guilty to one felony count after posting explicit videos of his sexual performance with a 13-year-old child in 2015. Fellow American rapper Azealia Banks criticized Minaj in a series of tweets and Instagram posts dated July 24, for collaborating and touring with 6ix9ine. She said, "I'm sorry. Dude gets convicted and you're still trying to help him out of it? That is very dark," and described working with 6ix9ine as a "slap [to] all of your 8-15 year old fans and their moms in the face". She added that "pedophilia is absolutely gross and evil. Anyone who supports that shit is a lunatic". Nicki Minaj's decision to work with him on the single and the sexually provocative nature of its music video came off as willfully ignorant in the wake his allegations at the height of the #MeToo movement. In an article published on Pitchfork, columnist Shanita Hubbard addressed the issue and discussed the cultural normalization of predatory behavior. She briefly touched on the social media campaign #MuteRKelly, writing, "The choice to use her platform to further legitimize a sexual predator is in direct contrast with the nation-wide, black women-led movement to silence music's most infamous abuser." Hubbard also noted that Minaj's actions contradict with statements she made previously. On May 25, 2012, Minaj spoke out against child molesters in a tweet where she stated, "And for the record on sum serious shit, I believe people who abuse children should be stoned to death in public. The end." Hubbard concluded by writing:

"If this pattern of normalization continues to seep into our culture, by the time the magnitude of the damage is determined it will have caused irreparable harm to society. While Minaj's album is titled Queen, I have no expectations of her to reign over the moral compass of hip-hop. Nor do I expect her to rule her career with flawless perfection. But I do hope she realizes that the message she sends by supporting an abuser threatens to eclipse the vibrant verses she has spent years perfecting.

== Credits and personnel ==
Credits and personnel adapted from Tidal and YouTube.

- 6ix9ine – lead vocals
- Nicki Minaj – lead vocals
- Murda Beatz – production
- Kevin Gomringer – co-production
- Tim Gomringer – co-production
- Aubry "Big Juice" Delaine – engineering
- Wizard Lee Weinberg – engineering, mastering, mixing

== Charts ==
=== Weekly charts ===
Chart (2018)	Peak position
Australia (ARIA)	8
Austria (Ö3 Austria Top 40)	14
Belgium (Ultratip Bubbling Under Flanders)	1
Belgium (Ultratop 50 Wallonia)	42
Canada Hot 100 (Billboard)	3
Czech Republic Singles Digital (ČNS IFPI)	5
Denmark (Tracklisten)	22
Estonia (Eesti Tipp)	7
Finland (Suomen virallinen lista)	5
France (SNEP)	16
Germany (GfK)	16
Hungary (Single Top 40)	5
Hungary (Stream Top 40)	8
Ireland (IRMA)	21
Italy (FIMI)	30
Netherlands (Dutch Tipparade 40)	2
Netherlands (Single Top 100)	14
New Zealand (Recorded Music NZ)	3
Norway (VG-lista)	14
Portugal (AFP)	14
Scottish Singles Sales (Official Charts)	65
Slovakia Singles Digital (ČNS IFPI)	1
Spain (PROMUSICAE)	79
Sweden (Sverigetopplistan)	6
Switzerland (Schweizer Hitparade)	10
UK Singles (Official Charts)	17
US Billboard Hot 100	3
US Hot R&B/Hip-Hop Songs (Billboard)	3
US R&B/Hip-Hop Airplay (Billboard)	16
US Rhythmic Airplay (Billboard)	5

=== Year-end charts ===
Chart (2018)	Position
Canada (Canadian Hot 100)	50
France (SNEP)	149
US Billboard Hot 100	31
US Hot R&B/Hip-Hop Songs (Billboard)	15
US Rhythmic (Billboard)	34

== Certifications ==
Region	Certification	Certified units/sales
Brazil (Pro-Música Brasil)	Platinum	40,000^{‡}
Canada (Music Canada)	Platinum	80,000^{‡}
Denmark (IFPI Danmark)	Gold	45,000^{‡}
France (SNEP)	Platinum	200,000^{‡}
Italy (FIMI)	Gold	25,000^{‡}
Mexico (AMPROFON)	Platinum+Gold	90,000^{‡}
Netherlands (NVPI)	Platinum	80,000^{‡}
New Zealand (RMNZ)	2× Platinum	60,000^{‡}
Norway (IFPI Norway)	Gold	30,000^{‡}
United Kingdom (BPI)	Gold	400,000^{‡}
United States (RIAA)	5× Platinum	5,000,000^{‡}
Streaming
Sweden (GLF)	Platinum	8,000,000^{†}
^{‡} Sales+streaming figures based on certification alone.^{†} Streaming-only figures based on certification alone.

== Release history ==
Region	Date	Format	Label	Ref.
Worldwide	July 22, 2018	Digital download; streaming	ScumGang; TenThousand Projects	

== See also ==
- List of best-selling singles in the United States
- #MuteRKelly
