= Delincuente (song) =

Single by Tokischa, Anuel AA and Ñengo Flow
- Language: Spanish
- English title: "Offender"
- Released: August 19, 2022
- Genre: Dembow
- Length: 3:47
- Label: Sony Music Latin
- Songwriters: Tokischa Altagracia Peralta Juárez; Emmanuel Gazmey Santiago; Edwin Rosa Vázquez
- Producer: Leo RD

Tokischa singles chronology
"Somos Iguales" (2022)	"Delincuente" (2022)	"Hung Up On Tokischa" (2022)

Anuel AA singles chronology
"Malo" (2022)	"Delincuente" (2022)	"Mercedes Tintia" (2022)

Ñengo Flow singles chronology
"Civiles" (2022)	"Delincuente" (2022)	"Ninfómana" (2022)

Music video
- "Delincuente" on YouTube

"Delincuente" (English: Offender) is a song by the Dominican singer Tokischa and the Puerto Rican singers Anuel AA and Ñengo Flow. It was released on August 19, 2022, under the Sony Music Latin record label.

== Music and lyrics ==
"Delincuente"
A 10 seconds sample of the chorus.

Musically, the song has a dembow rhythm. Lyrically, the song talks about the protagonist's sexual encounters with her partner whom she calls a "delinquent." He describes how they engage in sexual activities in different parts of their house, in the car and even in public. The lyrics are explicit and contain graphic descriptions of the sexual act. The lyrics includes, "Tengo un delincuente en mi habitación / A veces me lo mete al pelo y a veces con condón / Tengo un delincuente en mi habitación / Me lo mete en la cocina y a veces hasta en el balcón".

== Music video ==
The official music video was published along with the single on August 19, 2022, on the Tokischa's official YouTube channel. The video features the participation of Yailin La Más Viral.

== Charts ==
Chart (2022)	Peak position
US Hot Latin Songs (Billboard)	27

== Certifications ==
Certifications and sales for "Delincuente"
Region	Certification	Certified units/sales
United States (RIAA)	4× Platinum (Latin)	240,000^{‡}
Mexico (AMPROFON)	Platinum	140,000^{‡}
Spain (Promusicae)	Platinum	60,000^{‡}
^{‡} Sales+streaming figures based on certification alone.
