= Mercedes Tintia =

Single by Anuel AA

from the album LLNM2
- Language: Spanish
- Released: August 25, 2022
- Genre: Reggaeton
- Length: 3:12
- Label: Real Hasta la Muerte
- Songwriter(s): Emmanuel Gazmey; Freddy Montalvo Alicea; Jose Carlos Cruz; Gabriel Mora
- Producer(s): Subelo NEO

Anuel AA singles chronology
"Delincuente" (2022)	"Mercedes Tintia" (2022)	"Nosotros" (2022)

Music video
- "Mercedes Tintia" on YouTube

"Mercedes Tintia" (Spanish for "Tinted Mercedes") is a song by Puerto Rican rapper Anuel AA. The song was released on August 25, 2022, through Real Hasta la Muerte as the second single from Anuel AA's fifth studio album LLNM2.

== Background ==
A part of the song, known previously as "G5", was leaked in the beginning of August. Later Anuel AA announced that the track with the name "Mercedes Tintia" will come out as the second single of his upcoming album.

== Commercial performance ==
"Mercedes Tintia" debuted at number 29 on Billboard's Hot Latin Songs chart and at number 7 on the US Billboard Latin Digital Song Sales chart. In Spain's official weekly chart, the song debuted at number 59. On the Argentina Hot 100's chart, the song debuted at number 97.

== Music video ==
The music video for "Mercedes Tintia" was released on August 26, 2022, and produced by TruViews and Anuel AA. It was filmed in Casa de Campo, Dominican Republic and shows Anuel driving a tinted Mercedes. In the music video he also announced his collaboration with Reebok and Foot Locker.

== Charts ==
Chart (2020)	Peak position
Argentina (Argentina Hot 100)	97
Chile (Billboard)	25
Global 200 (Billboard)	177
Spain (PROMUSICAE)	15
US Latin Digital Song Sales (Billboard)	7
US Hot Latin Songs (Billboard)	29

== Certifications ==
Certifications and sales for "Mercedes Tintia"
Region	Certification	Certified units/sales
Spain (PROMUSICAE)	Gold	30,000^{‡}
^{‡} Sales+streaming figures based on certification alone.
