= Kooda =

Single by 6ix9ine

from the EP Day69
- Released: December 3, 2017
- Recorded: 2017
- Genre: Hip-hop; hardcore hip-hop; gangsta rap; trap
- Length: 2:22
- Label: ScumGang; 10K
- Songwriter: Daniel Hernandez
- Producer: Koncept P

6ix9ine singles chronology
"Gummo" (2017)	"Kooda" (2017)	"Keke" (2018)

Music video
- "Kooda" on YouTube

"Kooda" (stylized in all caps) is a song by American rapper 6ix9ine for his third EP Day69 (2018). It was released commercially on December 3, 2017, for digital download and streaming, through ScumGang Records and 10K Projects. The song was written by 6ix9ine himself and produced by Koncept P. It peaked at number 50 on the US Billboard Hot 100.

== Background and release ==
"Kooda" is the second single by 6ix9ine from his debut mixtape Day69 (2018). The song references ScumGang Records, Xanax, Ruger, and Fendi, among others. It debuted at number 61 on the US Billboard Hot 100 the week of December 23, 2017, and peaked at number 50.

== Music video ==
An accompanying music video for the song premiered on WorldStarHipHop via its official YouTube channel. It features Tekashi 6ix9ine in the streets of the Bedford-Stuyvesant neighborhood in Brooklyn with members of the Bloods and Crips street gangs, in a similar vein to the music video for "Gummo". "I got the best videos in America with no budget," Tekashi 6ix9ine proclaimed to Mass Appeal in an interview. "These industry videos got 50K to 100K and I work with zero dollars."

== Charts ==
=== Weekly charts ===
Chart (2017–18)	Peak position
Canada (Canadian Hot 100)	58
Slovakia (Singles Digitál Top 100)	95
US Billboard Hot 100	50
US Hot R&B/Hip-Hop Songs (Billboard)	20
US Hot Rap Songs (Billboard)	17

=== Year-end charts ===
Chart (2018)	Position
US Hot R&B/Hip-Hop Songs (Billboard)	82

== Certifications ==
Region	Certification	Certified units/sales
Canada (Music Canada)	Gold	40,000^{‡}
New Zealand (RMNZ)	Gold	15,000^{‡}
United States (RIAA)	Platinum	1,000,000^{‡}
^{‡} Sales+streaming figures based on certification alone.
