= Gotti (song) =

2017 song by 6ix9ine

Single by 6ix9ine

from the album Day69: Graduation Day
- Released: April 10, 2018
- Recorded: 2017
- Genre: Trap-soul
- Length: 2:46
- Label: ScumGang; TenThousand Projects
- Songwriters: Daniel Hernandez; Anthony Flammia & George Daniels
- Producers: Flamm & Sticks

6ix9ine singles chronology
"Keke" (2018)	"Gotti" (2018)	"Tati" (2018)

Music video
- "Gotti" on YouTube

"Gotti" (stylized in all caps) is a song by American rapper 6ix9ine for his re-released debut mixtape Day69: Graduation Day (2018). It was released commercially on April 10, 2018. Written alongside producers Flamm & Sticks, it peaked at number 99 on the US Billboard Hot 100.

== Music video ==
An accompanying music video for the song premiered on WorldStarHipHop via its YouTube channel. It features 6ix9ine in the Dominican Republic at a private villa and on the streets handing out cash to locals.

== Charts ==
Chart (2018)	Peak position
Canada Hot 100 (Billboard)	75
UK Singles (OCC)	95
US Billboard Hot 100	99
US Hot R&B/Hip-Hop Songs (Billboard)	50

== Certifications ==
Region	Certification	Certified units/sales
Brazil (Pro-Música Brasil)	Gold	20,000^{‡}
New Zealand (RMNZ)	Gold	15,000^{‡}
United Kingdom (BPI)	Silver	200,000^{‡}
^{‡} Sales+streaming figures based on certification alone.
