= El Nene =

Single by Foreign Teck and Anuel AA

from the album LLNM2
- Language: Spanish
- Released: October 27, 2022
- Genre: Latin trap
- Length: 3:00
- Label: WK RECORDS; Real Hasta la Muerte
- Songwriters: Michael Hernandez; Emmanuel Gazmey; Carlos Suarez; Tyshane Thompson; Cortes Elis; Dejan Nikolic; Ervin Quiroz; Frank Polonia; Jorge Luiz Perez Jr
- Producers: Foreign Teck; BEAM; Dim Crux; Nik Dean; Teezio

Foreign Teck singles chronology
"Gastar" (2022)	"El Nene" (2022)	"AP" (2023)

Anuel AA singles chronology
"La 2blea" (2022)	"El Nene" (2022)	"Diamantes en Mis Dientes" (2022)

Music video
- "El Nene" on YouTube

"El Nene" (Spanish for "The Boy") is a song by Dominican-American producer Foreign Teck and Puerto Rican rapper Anuel AA. The song was released on October 27, 2022, through WK RECORDS and Real Hasta la Muerte as the sixth single from Anuel AA's fifth studio album LLNM2.

== Background ==
Foreign Teck hinted at his next single in an Instagram post. Later Anuel AA posted a preview of the song called "El Nene". The official visualizer of the song was posted on October 27, 2022, on Anuel's YouTube channel. The music video was released one day later. On November 26, 2022, Anuel AA announced that "El Nene" would be one of the singles of his upcoming studio album LLNM2.

== Commercial performance ==
"El Nene" debuted and peaked at number 26 on the US Billboard Latin Digital Song Sales and at number 12 on the US Billboard Latin Digital Song Sales chart on November 12, 2022. In Spain's official weekly chart, the song debuted at number 59.

== Awards and nominations ==
Awards and nominations for '"El Nene"
Year	Ceremony	Category	Result
2023	Premios Tu Música Urbano	Top Song — Trap	Won

== Music video ==
The music video for "El Nene" was released on October 28, 2022, and shows the gangster life. Anuel AA is shown with a wad of bills, something this song also talks about because it reflects that fame sometimes makes him distrust anyone.

== Live performances ==
Anuel AA performed "El Nene" at The Tonight Show Starring Jimmy Fallon on January 18, 2022.

== Charts ==
Chart (2022)	Peak position
Spain (PROMUSICAE)	59
US Hot Latin Songs (Billboard)	26
US Latin Digital Song Sales (Billboard)	32

== Certifications ==
Region	Certification	Certified units/sales
United States (RIAA)	2× Platinum (Latin)	120,000^{‡}
^{‡} Sales+streaming figures based on certification alone.
