= Keke (song) =

Single by 6ix9ine, Fetty Wap and A Boogie wit da Hoodie

from the album Day69
- Released: January 14, 2018
- Recorded: 2017
- Genre: Hip-hop, trap
- Length: 2:31
- Label: ScumGang; TenThousand
- Songwriters: Daniel Hernandez; Willie Maxwell II; Artist Julius Dubose
- Producer: WalteezyAFN

6ix9ine singles chronology
"Kooda" (2017)	"Keke" (2018)	"Gotti" (2018)

Fetty Wap singles chronology
"There She Go" (2017)	"Keke" (2018)	"KissWowie" (2018)

A Boogie wit da Hoodie singles chronology
"Say A" (2017)	"Keke" (2018)	"Wait" (2018)

Music video
- "Keke" on YouTube

"Keke" (stylized in all caps) is a song written and performed by American rappers 6ix9ine, Fetty Wap, and A Boogie wit da Hoodie. The song was released commercially on January 14, 2018, for streaming and digital download by ScumGang Records. "Keke" is produced by WalteezyAFN and is the third single by 6ix9ine from his second mixtape Day69 (2018).

== Background ==
In March 2017, the solo version of the track was uploaded to the ELEVATOR music channel under the name "On The Regular". However, the song initially failed to gain mainstream success and became a sleeper hit. The remix of the song was previewed by 6ix9ine in late 2017 via his Instagram, with it leaking on December 29, 2017.

== Music video ==
The music video was premiered by WorldStarHipHop via the official YouTube channel on January 14, 2018. It was directed by Figure Eight Films and features 6ix9ine, Fetty Wap and A Boogie wit da Hoodie in the streets of New York, in similar vein to 6ix9ine's music videos for "Gummo", "Kooda", and "Billy".

== Commercial performance ==
The song entered at number 63 on the US Billboard Hot 100, peaking at number 43 on the chart dated February 3, 2018.

== Charts ==
Chart (2018)	Peak position
Canada Hot 100 (Billboard)	37
Slovakia Singles Digital (ČNS IFPI)	91
US Billboard Hot 100	43
US Hot R&B/Hip-Hop Songs (Billboard)	22
US Hot Rap Songs (Billboard)	20

== Certifications ==
Region	Certification	Certified units/sales
Canada (Music Canada)	Gold	40,000^{‡}
New Zealand (RMNZ)	Gold	15,000^{‡}
United States (RIAA)	Platinum	1,000,000^{‡}
^{‡} Sales+streaming figures based on certification alone.
