= Malo (song) =

Single by Anuel AA, Zion and Randy

from the album LLNM2
- Language: Spanish
- Released: July 14, 2022
- Genre: Reggaeton
- Length: 4:15
- Label: Real Hasta la Muerte
- Songwriter(s): Emmanuel Gazmey Santiago; Félix Gerardo Ortiz Torres; Randy Ariel Ortiz Acevedo
- Producer(s): Kronix Magical; Mauro; J Castle

Anuel AA singles chronology
"¿Qué Nos Pasó?" (2022)	"Malo" (2022)	"Delincuente" (2022)

Zion singles chronology
"143" (2022)	"Malo" (2021)	"Haciendolo" (2022)

Randy singles chronology
"Bad (Latin Remix)" (2022)	"Malo" (2022)	"Feliz" (2022)

Music video
- "Malo" on YouTube

"Malo" (transl. "Bad") is a song by Puerto Rican rappers and singers Anuel AA, Zion and Randy and was released on July 14, 2021. It was released as the first single from his fifth album LLNM2.

== Background ==
The song was officially previewed by Anuel AA in his Instagram profile. "I am happy to show you the first song of this production that has been made with a lot of love. Thanks to Zion and Randy for the collaboration, they are tough! Get ready because we will continue to break with more music," Anuel AA commented the song in a statement.

== Music video ==
The video was directed by TruViews and Anuel AA and was filmed in Miami, Dominican Republic and Puerto Rico. It shows Anuel, Zion and Randy dancing alongside 70 women. At the end of the music video, Anuel AA showed the alternative cover of his upcoming album LLNM2.

== Charts ==
Chart (2021)	Peak position
US Hot Latin Songs (Billboard)	38
US Latin Digital Song Sales (Billboard)	12
Spain (PROMUSICAE)	78
