= Tati (song) =

Single by 6ix9ine featuring DJ SpinKing

from the album Dummy Boy and Day69
- Released: May 27, 2018
- Recorded: 2018
- Genre: Drill; trap
- Length: 2:35
- Label: ScumGang; TenThousand Projects
- Songwriters: Daniel Hernandez; Matthew Samuels; Tim Gomringer; Kevin Gomringer; Gibran Jairam
- Producers: Boi-1da; Cubeatz; DJ SpinKing

6ix9ine singles chronology
"Gotti" (2018)	"Tati" (2018)	"Fefe" (2018)

Music video
- "Tati" on YouTube

"Tati" (stylized in all caps) is a single by American rapper 6ix9ine, released commercially on May 27, 2018 as the lead single from the debut studio album Dummy Boy and a Japanese bonus track of the mixtape Day69. The song was produced by Boi-1da, Cubeatz, and DJ SpinKing, which the latter is also featured on the song. It peaked at number 46 on the US Billboard Hot 100.

== Music video ==
An accompanying music video for the song premiered on WorldStarHipHop via its YouTube channel. It features 6ix9ine in a red SUV with a bandana vinyl, in an apartment with various women, and in the streets of Brooklyn, New York City with some members of the Bloods gang.

== Charts ==
Chart (2018)	Peak position
UK Singles (Official Charts)	100
US Billboard Hot 100	46
US Hot R&B/Hip-Hop Songs (Billboard)	23

== Certifications ==
Region	Certification	Certified units/sales
Canada (Music Canada)	Gold	40,000^{‡}
New Zealand (RMNZ)	Gold	15,000^{‡}
United States (RIAA)	Platinum	1,000,000^{‡}
^{‡} Sales+streaming figures based on certification alone.
