= LLNM2 =

2022 studio album by Anuel AA

Studio album by Anuel AA
- Released: December 9, 2022
- Recorded: 2017–2022
- Genres: Latin trap; reggaeton
- Length: 126:00
- Languages: Spanish; English
- Labels: Real Hasta la Muerte; Sony Latin
- Producers: Chris Jedi; Gaby Music; Dímelo Ninow; Mvsis; Alexer; AndoConJon; Foreign Teck; MadMusick; Yan Mad; Yon Mad; EZ Made da Beat; Súbelo NEO; EQ el Equalizer; Late Night Cartel; Goose the Guru; Prida; Misael de la Cruz; J Castle; Max Borghetti; Kronix Magical; Mauro; Dim Crux; Hide Miyabi; Mundito High Class; DJ Blass; JS Beatz; Mista Greenzz; David Guetta; Wain; Jaycen Joshua; Colla; Cashtro; Otis Vibes; Albert Hype; Scxtt; Keanu Beats; Jakke Erixson; Mike Hawkins; Thor; Getro; Williams Beatz; Tower beatz; Andyr; Toby Green; Ricardo Sangiao; Havoc; SkipOnDaBeat; Dime Ecua; Lil Geniuz; Cromo X; Leo RD; Dulce como Candy; Smash David

Anuel AA chronology
Las Leyendas Nunca Mueren (2021)	LLNM2 (2022)	Real Hasta La Muerte 2 (2026)

Singles from LLNM2
- 1. "Malo" Released: July 14, 2022; 2. "Mercedes Tintia" Released: August 25, 2022; 3. "Nosotros" Released: September 8, 2022; 4. "Brother" Released: September 14, 2022; 5. "La 2blea" Released: September 30, 2022; 6. "El Nene" Released: October 27, 2022; 7. "Diamantes en Mis Dientes" Released: November 1, 2022; 8. "Si Yo Me Muero" Released: November 23, 2022; 9. "Hoodie" Released: December 1, 2022

LLNM2 (an abbreviation of "Las Leyendas Nunca Mueren 2" in Spanish, meaning "Legends Never Die 2") is the fourth solo studio album by Puerto Rican rapper Anuel AA. It was released on December 9, 2022, through Real Hasta la Muerte and Sony Music Latin. Formerly announced as an EP with the title Me Fui de Gira, the project follows his studio album Las Leyendas Nunca Mueren (2021) as its second part.

The album features collaborations with Omega, David Guetta, Jowell & Randy, De La Ghetto, Yailin La Más Viral, Bryant Myers, Mvsis, Kodak Black, Ñengo Flow, DaBaby, Treintisiete, Foreign Teck, YovngChimi, Lil Durk, Nicky Jam, RobGz, Zion and Randy.

== Background ==
After the release of his studio album Las Leyendas Nunca Mueren, Anuel AA decided to record a second part of the album. In April 2022 he uploaded a video for his Legends Never Die world tour. Later he announced the name of an upcoming extended play in an Instagram post and announced that it would include six or seven tracks. In multiple Instagram posts Anuel AA confirmed that he unifies Las Leyendas Nunca Mueren 2 and the EP Me Fui de Gira in a full studio album with the name LLNM2.

== Release and promotion ==
The first single of the album was "Malo", a collaboration with Zion and Randy released on July 14, 2022. The second single was "Mercedes Tintia", released on August 25, 2022. Following the success of "Mercedes Tintia", Anuel released "Nosotros" on September 8, 2022, "Brother" on September 14, and "La 2blea" on September 30. This released was followed by a video of "El Nene", a collaboration with Foreign Teck, on October 27, "Diamantes en Mis Dientes" with YovngChimi on November 1, and "Si Yo Me Muero", with Puerto Rican producer Mvsis, released on November 23, 2022. The last single for the album, "Hoodie" with Bryant Myers, was released on December 1, 2022.

== Track listing ==
LLNM2 track listing
No.	Title	Writer(s)	Producer(s)	Length
1.	"Brrr"	Emmanuel Gazmey Santiago	EZ Made da Beat; Havoc; EQ el Equalizer; Ricardo Sangiao	3:36
2.	"Borracha & Loca" (with Omega)	Gazmey; Antonio de la Rosa	Chris Jedi; Gaby Music; Dímelo Ninow	3:49
3.	"Vibra" (with David Guetta)	Gazmey; David Guetta; Jakke Erixson; Mike Hawkins; Toby Green	David Guetta; Jakke Erixson; Mike Hawkins; Thor; Toby Green; Colla	2:33
4.	"La Máquina" (with Jowell & Randy and De La Ghetto featuring Yailin La Más Viral)	Gazmey; Joel Muñoz; Randy Ortiz; Rafael Castillo; Jorgina Guillermo; William Manzano	DJ Blass; JS Beatz; Mista Greenzz; Súbelo NEO; Late Night Cartel; Goose the Guru; Cashtro; EQ el Equalizer; Ricardo Sangiao	4:56
5.	"Hoodie" (with Bryant Myers)	Gazmey; Bryan Rohena	Chris Jedi; Gaby Music; Dímelo Ninow; Marshak; Sleezyotb	4:10
6.	"Si Yo Me Muero" (with Mvsis)	Gazmey	Mvsis; Alexer; AndoConJon; Colla	3:19
7.	"Sufro" (with Kodak Black and Ñengo Flow)	Gazmey; Bill Kapri; Edwin Vázquez; Michael Hernandez; Giencarlos Rivera; Jonathan Rivera; Edgar Ferrera; Omar Alfano; Gabriel Mora	Foreign Teck; MadMusick; SkipOnDaBeat; Dime Ecua; Yan Mad; Yon Mad	4:36
8.	"Las Jordan"	Gazmey	Cromo X; Gabriel Domenic; Lil Geniuz; EQ el Equalizer; Ricardo Sangiao	4:03
9.	"Wakanda" (with DaBaby)	Gazmey; Jonathan Kirk	Súbelo NEO; Lil Geniuz; Lanalizer; Cromo X	3:30
10.	"Somo Así"	Gazmey	Chris Jedi; Gaby Music; Dímelo Ninow	3:26
11.	"Me Siento HP"	Gazmey	Smash David; Bugz Ronin; Dim Crux; Lil Geniuz; Argel Beatz; Dime Ecua; Digital Jet	3:48
12.	"Del Kilo" (with Treintisiete and Yailin La Más Viral)	Gazmey; Yeuri Ramírez; Guillermo	Leo RD	3:46
13.	"Contra la Corriente"	Gazmey	SkipOnDaBeat; EZ Made da Beat; Prida; Al Cres; Dim Crux; Dime Ecua	3:30
14.	"Mintiendo"	Gazmey	Lil Geniuz	3:35
15.	"El Nene" (with Foreign Teck)	Gazmey; Michael Hernandez; Carlos Suarez	Foreign Teck; Beam; Nik Dean; Dim Crux; Colla	3:00
16.	"Diamantes en Mis Dientes" (with YovngChimi)	Gazmey; Ángel Aviles	EZ Made da Beat; Prida; EQ el Equalizer	5:44
17.	"Teteo"	Gazmey	Chris Jedi; Gaby Music; Dímelo Ninow; Dulce como Candy	3:21
18.	"Monstruo"	Gazmey	Mvsis; Misael de la Cruz; Albert Hype	3:55
19.	"Mercedes Tintia"	Gazmey	Súbelo NEO	3:15
20.	"1ro" (with Lil Durk)	Gazmey; Durk Banks	Ricci Riera; Dim Crux; Colla	3:28
21.	"Mientes" (with Nicky Jam)	Gazmey; Nick Rivera	Lil Geniuz; Stivenz Beats; Súbelo NEO	3:32
22.	"40"	Gazmey	Hydro; Bassyy	3:31
23.	"La 2blea"	Gazmey	Foreign Teck; Mvsis; Misael de la Cruz; Bass Charity; Colla	5:25
24.	"Sin Ti"	Gazmey	Súbelo NEO; Lil Geniuz; Botlok; Ammu-Nation	3:42
25.	"Airbnb" (with RobGz)	Gazmey; Robert Lasso	Young Hollywood; Dime Ecua; Irving Reyes	4:14
26.	"Ascensor"	Gazmey	Chris Jedi; Gaby Music	3:12
27.	"Anuel & Emmanuel"	Gazmey	Foreign Teck; SkipOnDaBeat; EQ el Equalizer; EZ Made Da Beat; Prida; Al Cres; Colla	4:38
28.	"Tú Lo Sabes"	Gazmey	Mvsis; Misael de la Cruz; Keanu Beats; Scxtt	3:57
29.	"Coroné"	Gazmey	DatBoiGetro; Andyr; Max Borghetti; Minor2Go	3:20
30.	"Tiene Novio"	Christian Adorno; Daniel Mizrahi; Emmanuel Gazmey; Ervin Quiroz; Joan Antonio Gonzalez Marrero; Jordan Emil Miranda Rivera; Juan Jose Botero; Max Borghetti	Mantra; Lil Geniuz; Dim Crux; Reyes	3:14
31.	"Nosotros"	Gazmey	Mvsis; Misael de la Cruz; Elikai; Cheo Legendary; EQ el Equalizer; Wain; Jaycen Joshua	4:22
32.	"Malo" (with Zion and Randy)	Gazmey; Félix Ortiz; Randy Ortiz	J Castle; Kronix Magical; Mauro	4:15
33.	"Brother"	Gazmey	Splitmind; Dim Crux; EQ el Equalizer; Hide Miyabi; Mundito High Class; Max Borghetti; Steven Shaeffer	3:29
Total length:				126:00

== Awards and nominations ==
Awards and nominations for LLNM2
Year	Ceremony	Category	Result
2023	Premios Tu Música Urbano	Album of the Year - Male Artist	Nominated
2023	Billboard Latin Music Awards	Latin Rhythm Album	Nominated

== Charts ==
=== Weekly charts ===
Weekly chart performance for LLNM2
Chart (2022)	Peak position
Spanish Albums (Promusicae)	8
US Billboard 200	30
US Top Latin Albums (Billboard)	2
US Latin Rhythm Albums (Billboard)	2
US Independent Albums (Billboard)	3

=== Year-end charts ===
Year-end chart performance for LLNM2
Chart (2023)	Position
Spanish Albums (PROMUSICAE)	46

== Certifications ==
Certifications for LLNM2
Region	Certification	Certified units/sales
Spain (Promusicae)	Gold	20,000^{‡}
United States (RIAA)	3× Platinum (Latin)	180,000^{‡}
^{‡} Sales+streaming figures based on certification alone.
