= Shaka Laka =

2023 single by 6ix9ine and Yailin La Más Viral featuring Kodak Black

Single by 6ix9ine featuring Kodak Black & Yailin La Más Viral
- Released: July 21, 2023
- Genre: Gangsta rap; trap
- Length: 2:57
- Label: 6ix9ine; La Corporación
- Songwriters: Daniel Hernandez; Jorgina Guillermo Díaz; Bill Kapri; Mauro Bertran; Andrew Green
- Producers: El Código Secreto; TrifeDrew

6ix9ine singles chronology
"Dueño" (2023)	"Shaka Laka" (2023)

Yailin La Más Viral singles chronology
"Mia" (2023)	"Shaka Laka" (2023)	"Feefafo" (2023)

Kodak Black singles chronology
"Angel Pt. 2" (2023)	"Shaka Laka" (2023)	"Hvn on Earth" (2023)

Music video
- "Shaka Laka" on YouTube

"Shaka Laka" is a single by American rapper 6ix9ine featuring fellow American rapper Kodak Black and Dominican rapper Yailin La Más Viral. Released on July 21, 2023, the song was written alongside producers El Código Secreto and TrifeDrew, the latter of whom performs the chorus.

== Background ==
6ix9ine's business associate Wack 100 arranged for the collaboration with Kodak Black. Following the song's release, Wack revealed Black was paid one million dollars and received a Rolls-Royce for appearing on the track.

"Shaka Laka" is also 6ix9ine's first song performing in English since "Giné" (2022).

== Composition and critical reception ==
Gabriel Bras Nevares described the song as a "fast-paced club anthem with a lot of varied vocal delivery whose bounce could probably still break through for reggaeton-centered audiences", and that 6ix9ine "sounds more like Tory Lanez than himself, and it actually makes for a pretty fun and enjoyable listen." Nevares also wrote, "Furthermore, a significant part of that is due to the featured artists, albeit for pretty different but well-complemented reasons. On one hand, Kodak Black came through with a more cold-blooded delivery that involved some cool flow switch-ups in the track's midpoint. On the other, Yailin's melodic verse and laidback demeanor gives fans a catchy verse in Spanish that makes 'Shaka Laka' a little more dynamic. Still, for those that hope for 6ix9ine to return to his earlier style, you get a little bit of that here thanks to his verse. It's just as bombastic, slightly ridiculous, but nonetheless energizing than some of his early work, with all the gun onomatopoeia you could imagine in thirty seconds."

== Controversy ==
In 2019, 6ix9ine testified against fellow members of the Nine Trey Gangsters in a racketeering and firearms case in exchange for a reduced sentence, for which he has gained a negative reputation as a "snitch" in the hip hop community. Kodak Black received immediate backlash for his collaboration with 6ix9ine on the song from rapper Boosie Badazz, who stated on Instagram Live that Black had no morals or principles and "ain't no street nigga". Kodak responded by reposting the video of Boosie's rant and calling him a "clown", to which Boosie reacted in a Twitter post stating Black had "sold his soul" for money.

== Charts ==
Chart performance for "Shaka Laka"
Chart (2023)	Peak position
New Zealand Hot Singles (RMNZ)	34
US Bubbling Under Hot 100 (Billboard)	17
US Hot R&B/Hip-Hop Songs (Billboard)	34
