= OnSmash =

Hip hop blog

OnSMASH, previously OnSmash.com, is a hip hop blog founded by Kevin "Hof" Hofman, a native of Long Island. It is a part of the blog family New Music Cartel (NMC). OnSMASH LLC, the corporate entity, has its headquarters in Huntington, New York.

== History ==
The website was founded in 2006. Vibe described it as a "hip hop YouTube".

OnSmash.com was the original outlet to post material from rappers like Cam'ron and 50 Cent engaging in beef that had not yet been reported through mediums like BET and MTV. Lee Q. O'Denat, the founder of WorldStarHipHop, used the setup of OnSmash.com to make his own website, hiring coders to steal the source code of the original OnSMASH player. O'Denat said that this led to tension between the two websites. The site focused on fight videos and unadulterated content that had nothing to do with music, unlike OnSMASH, which kept its ear for new talent and only posted music and videos to better the culture.

Before OnSMASH was a blog, the forums served as an important part of the rap Internet. It birthed many topics and characters, making OS the hub for culture on the underground level before blogs.

On November 25, 2010 (Thanksgiving), the United States Immigration and Customs Enforcement seized the domain name due to allegations of selling of counterfeit goods and piracy. Hofman initially believed that hackers had removed the site, but he later learned that the U.S. government had taken it down. Ben Sisario of The New York Times said "OnSmash.com and the handful of other music blogs shut down by the government post brand-new songs and videos without licenses, but much of that material is often leaked to them by managers, music labels and even the artists themselves." Alvin Blanco of MTV said "Reaction to the over-zealousness of authorities in shuttering the website last Thanksgiving Day was swift, with artists and fans bemoaning the fact that an outlet for new music from up-and-coming acts was unfairly targeted."

Hoffman purchased the domain name "FreeOnSmash.com" after the seizure of the original OnSmash.com. The new website opened on January 18, 2011. Blanco said "a quick visit reveals that its DNA remains the same" despite the new domain name. Hoffman said "Initially I planned to fall back and use this domain to chronicle our legal situation. After seeing the public outcry from artists and users alike, I felt we owed it to the culture to come back better than ever. We launched a refreshed version of the website and video player yesterday but have many new plans in store. I think this whole experience has forced us to evolve and look ahead."

In March 2012, Hoffman's lawyer submitted a memorandum to the government offering a compromise to negotiate the return of the site so long as he paid what the government determined to be its appraised value, $7. Three and a half years later, in late 2015, the five-year statute of limitations on the seizure ran out and the site was returned to Hoffman.
