= Day69 =

Mixtape by 6ix9ine
- Released: February 23, 2018
- Recorded: 2017
- Studios: Feet 1st, New York City
- Genres: East Coast hip-hop; gangsta rap; drill; trap; hardcore hip-hop; soundcloud rap
- Length: 27:02
- Labels: Scumgang; 10K; Caroline
- Producers: Beat Menace; Flamm; Koncept P; mjNichols; Pharaoh Vice; Pi'erre Bourne; Phosphate Beats; Taz Taylor; TooPristine; Wizard Lee Weinberg

6ix9ine chronology
Tekashi69 (2017)	Day69 (2018)	Dummy Boy (2018)

Alternate cover
- Day69: Graduation Day deluxe edition cover

Singles from Day69
- 1. "Gummo" Released: September 24, 2017; 2. "Kooda" Released: December 3, 2017; 3. "Keke" Released: January 14, 2018; 4. "Chocolaté" Released: February 23, 2018; 5. "Gotti" Released: April 21, 2018; 6. "Tati" Released: May 27, 2018

Day69 is the second commercial mixtape (Note: While some sources call this an EP, most sources call it a mixtape.) by American rapper 6ix9ine. It was released on February 23, 2018, independently by Scumgang Records and 10K Projects. The mixtape features guest appearances from Young Thug, Tory Lanez, Fetty Wap, A Boogie wit da Hoodie, and Offset.

Day69 was supported by six official singles: "Gummo", "Kooda", "Keke" with Fetty Wap and A Boogie wit da Hoodie, "Chocolaté", "Gotti", and "Tati".

== Background ==
On February 20, 2018, 6ix9ine revealed the final cover artwork and tracklist of the mixtape.

On February 24, a day after the mixtape's release, an artist on Tumblr with the username "cryptidsp00n" pointed out that the artist of the Day69 cover artwork traced over their artwork featuring the Adventure Time character Flame Princess.

== Promotion ==
On February 10, 2018, 6ix9ine previewed the first track off the mixtape, called "Billy" on his Instagram account. The music video for the track was released on March 4, 2018.

=== Singles ===
The first official single for Day69, called "Gummo" was released on September 24, 2017. The song was produced by Pi'erre Bourne. The song peaked at number 12 on the US Billboard Hot 100.

On December 3, 2017, 6ix9ine released the second official single for the mixtape, called "Kooda". The song references Scumgang Records, Xanax, Ruger, and Fendi, among others. The song debuted at number 61 on the US Billboard Hot 100 in the week of December 23, 2017, and peaked at number 50. An accompanying music video for the song premiered on WorldStarHipHop via its YouTube channel. It features 6ix9ine in the streets of New York with members of the Bloods and Crips gangs, in a similar vein to the music video for "Gummo".

On January 14, 2018, 6ix9ine released the third official single, "Keke" with American rappers Fetty Wap and A Boogie wit da Hoodie. The song was previewed by 6ix9ine in late 2017 via his Instagram, with the song leaking on December 29, 2017. The music video was premiered on WorldStarHipHop's official YouTube channel on January 14, 2018. It was directed by Figure Eight Films and features 6ix9ine, Fetty Wap and A Boogie wit da Hoodie in the streets of New York, in similar vein to 6ix9ine's music video for "Gummo" and "Kooda". The song entered at number 63 on the US Billboard Hot 100, peaking at number 43 on the chart dated February 3, 2018.

The fourth official single from Day69, "Gotti" was released on April 21, 2018.

== Critical reception ==
Professional ratings
Review scores
Source	Rating
HipHopDX	3.7/5
HotNewHipHop	45%
Rolling Stone	2/5 stars
Salute Magazine	3/5 stars

Day69 received mixed reviews from music critics. In a negative review, Charles Aaron of Rolling Stone stated that Day69 is "a grim dud. Unlike similarly cartoonish figures, like Onyx or Waka Flocka Flame, 6ix9ine flashes no humor or attempts at phrase-making or, um, songwriting. His overly reverbed flow is little more than an uncontrolled gusher of bullying faux-menace." Daniel Offner of Salute Magazine stated that "in terms of carrying its own weight, the album delivers with direct effect", adding that Day69 "comes to close with a full mag and one in the chamber."

Online publication HotNewHipHop criticized the mixtape's production and lyrical content, considering the project to be formulaic: "All things considered, Day69 is a staggering failure of artistic statement, especially for a rapper seeking to prove his worth to the rap game. Whether it's the unremarkable production, his own limitations as a rapper, or the severe drop in quality beyond the singles, there's not much going on to justify his existence in the rap game beyond an unfortunate habit of generating negative attention."

Trent Clark of HipHopDX believed the mixtape provided a refreshing return to hardcore hip-hop, also stating: "Of course, even with the short runtime, there's only so much bellowing and make-believe bodycounting listeners can take before they openly admit they don't want any more smoke. A kick-in-the-door project like Day69 is ripe for establishing a rap game motif but does little to crack the mystique surrounding the mind underneath the multi-colored mane."

== Commercial performance ==
Day69 debuted at number four on the US Billboard 200 chart, earning 55,000 album-equivalent units (including 20,000 traditional album sales) in its first week. In its second week, the album fell to number ten on the chart, earning an additional 24,000 units. On May 8, 2018, the mixtape was certified gold by the Recording Industry Association of America (RIAA) for combined sales and album-equivalent units of over 500,000 units in the United States.

== Track listing ==
Day69 – Standard version
No.	Title	Writer(s)	Producer(s)	Length
1.	"Billy"	Daniel Hernandez; Omar Gomez	Beat Menace	1:52
2.	"Gummo"	Hernandez; Andrew Green; Jordan Jenks	Pi'erre Bourne	2:37
3.	"Rondo" (featuring Tory Lanez and Young Thug)	Hernandez; Jeffery Williams; Daystar Peterson; Paul Penso	Koncept P	2:18
4.	"Keke" (with Fetty Wap and A Boogie wit da Hoodie)	Hernandez; Willie Maxwell II; Artist Dubose	Wizard Lee Weinberg; Toopristine^{[a]}	2:31
5.	"93"	Hernandez; Anthony Flammia	Flamm	2:16
6.	"Doowee"	Hernandez	Phosphate	2:13
7.	"Kooda"	Hernandez; Penso	Koncept P	2:22
8.	"Buba"	Hernandez; Danny Snodgrass Jr.; Maxwell Nichols; Henry Nichols	Taz Taylor; mjNichols^{[a]}; Pharaoh Vice^{[a]}	1:58
9.	"Mooky"	Hernandez; Flammia	Flamm	2:28
10.	"Gummo" (remix; featuring Offset)	Hernandez; Green; Jenks; Kiari Cephus	Pi'erre Bourne	3:25
11.	"Chocolaté"	Hernandez; Flammia	Flamm	3:02
Total length:				27:02

Day69: Graduation Day – Deluxe version (bonus track)
No.	Title	Writer(s)	Producer(s)	Length
12.	"Gotti"	Hernandez; Flammia	Sticksonthebeat; Flamm	2:46
Total length:				29:48

Japanese bonus track
No.	Title	Writer(s)	Producer(s)	Length
13.	"Tati" (featuring DJ SpinKing)	Hernandez; Matthew Samuels; Tim Gomringer; Kevin Gomringer; Gibran Jairam	Boi-1da; Cubeatz; DJ SpinKing	2:34

Notes

- ^{^[a]} signifies a co-producer
- Every song is stylized in uppercase letters. For example, "Gummo" is stylized as "GUMMO".
- "Billy" features additional vocals by Shotti

== Personnel ==
Credits adapted from Tidal.

- Wizard Lee Weinberg – mixing, mastering, recording

== Charts ==
=== Weekly charts ===
Chart (2018)	Peak position
Australian Albums (ARIA)	11
Australian Urban Albums (ARIA)	4
Austrian Albums (Ö3 Austria)	39
Belgian Albums (Ultratop Flanders)	21
Belgian Albums (Ultratop Wallonia)	47
Canadian Albums (Billboard)	5
Czech Albums (ČNS IFPI)	5
Danish Albums (Hitlisten)	26
Dutch Albums (Album Top 100)	10
Finnish Albums (Suomen virallinen lista)	21
French Albums (SNEP)	131
German Albums (Offizielle Top 100)	44
Irish Albums (IRMA)	30
Italian Albums (FIMI)	55
New Zealand Albums (RMNZ)	15
Norwegian Albums (VG-lista)	14
Slovak Albums (ČNS IFPI)	2
Spanish Albums (Promusicae)	81
Swedish Albums (Sverigetopplistan)	15
Swiss Albums (Schweizer Hitparade)	20
UK Albums (Official Charts)	20
US Billboard 200	4
US Independent Albums (Billboard)	1
US Top R&B/Hip-Hop Albums (Billboard)	3

=== Year-end charts ===
Chart (2018)	Position
Belgian Albums (Ultratop Flanders)	120
Belgian Albums (Ultratop Wallonia)	173
Danish Albums (Hitlisten)	69
Dutch Albums (MegaCharts)	58
Icelandic Albums (Plötutíóindi)	70
Swedish Albums (Sverigetopplistan)	35
US Billboard 200	75
US Top R&B/Hip-Hop Albums (Billboard)	40

== Certifications ==
Region	Certification	Certified units/sales
Canada (Music Canada)	Gold	40,000^{‡}
Denmark (IFPI Danmark)	Gold	10,000^{‡}
France (SNEP)	Gold	50,000^{‡}
Netherlands (NVPI)	Gold	20,000^{‡}
Norway (IFPI Norway)	Gold	10,000^{‡}
Sweden (GLF)	Gold	15,000^{‡}
United Kingdom (BPI)	Silver	60,000^{‡}
United States (RIAA)	Platinum	1,000,000^{‡}
^{‡} Sales+streaming figures based on certification alone.

== Release history ==
Region	Date	Format(s)	Label	Ref.
Various	February 23, 2018	Streaming; digital download	Scumgang; 10K	
Japan	July 27, 2018	CD	Scumgang; 10K; Hostess	
Various	August 17, 2018	CD; vinyl	Scumgang; 10K	
