= Leyenda Viva =

Studio album by 6ix9ine
- Released: June 16, 2023
- Genres: Reggaeton; dembow; Latin trap
- Length: 30:57
- Language: Spanish
- Label: La Corporación
- Producers: Angel Sandoval; Boris Arencibia; El Keretumba; Evert Gutierrez; Isael Gutierrez; J Prod; Mauro "El Código Secreto"

6ix9ine chronology
TattleTales (2020)	Leyenda Viva (2023)	Blackballed (2024)

Singles from Leyenda Viva
- 1. "Bori" Released: March 31, 2023; 2. "Wapae" Released: April 15, 2023; 3. "Y Ahora" Released: April 28, 2023; 4. "Pa Ti" Released: June 16, 2023; 5. "Dueño" Released: June 23, 2023

Leyenda Viva (English: Living Legend) is the third studio album by American rapper 6ix9ine. It was released on June 16, 2023, through La Corporación. Production was handled by Mauro "El Código Secreto", Boris Arencibia, J Prod, El Keretumba, Angel Sandoval, Isael Gutierrez and Evert Gutierrez. The album features guest appearances by Lenier, Secreto "El Famoso Biberón", Ángel Dior, Yailin La Más Viral and Grupo Firme. It is his first reggaeton release and serves as the follow-up to his previous album, TattleTales (2020).

== Background ==
On June 16, 2023, 6ix9ine released his first full reggaeton album without previous announcement.

== Singles ==
On March 31, 2023, 6ix9ine released the first single "Bori", which features Lenier. The single was announced and released after 6ix9ine was assaulted by three suspects in an LA Fitness gym in Lake Worth Beach, Florida. On April 15, 2023, he released the second single "Wapae", which features Lenier, Ángel Dior and Bulin 47. On April 28, 2023, he released the third single entitled "Y Ahora" which features the regional Mexican band Grupo Firme. On June 16, 2023, he released the fourth single "Pa Ti" which features Yailin La Más Viral, in addition to the release of the album. On June 23, 2023, he released the fifth and final single "Dueño", alongside a music video, which features Lenier.

== Track listing ==
Leyenda Viva track listing
No.	Title	Writer(s)	Producer(s)	Length
1.	"Bori" (with Lenier)	Daniel Hernandez; Álvaro Lenier Mesa; Mauro Bertran	Mauro "El Código Secreto"; Boris Arencibia	3:04
2.	"Papa" (with Lenier and Secreto "El Famoso Biberón")	Hernandez; Mesa; Bertran; Odalis Perez	Mauro "El Código Secreto"; Boris Arencibia	2:50
3.	"Wapae" (with Ángel Dior and Lenier featuring Bulin 47)	Hernandez; Mesa; Ángel Dior; José María Ávila; Bertran	J Prod; Mauro "El Código Secreto"; Boris Arencibia	2:55
4.	"Mata"	Hernandez; Mesa; Bertran	Mauro "El Código Secreto"; Boris Arencibia	2:20
5.	"Dueño" (with Lenier)	Hernandez; Mesa; Bertran	Mauro "El Código Secreto"; El Keretumba; Boris Arencibia	2:55
6.	"Pa Ti" (with Yailin La Más Viral)	Hernandez; Jorgina Lulú Guillermo Díaz; Mesa; Bertran	Mauro "El Código Secreto"; Boris Arencibia	2:50
7.	"Perra" (with Lenier)	Hernandez; Mesa; Bertran	Mauro "El Código Secreto"; Boris Arencibia	2:48
8.	"Nota" (with Grupo Firme and Lenier)	Hernandez; Mesa; Bertran	Mauro "El Código Secreto"; Boris Arencibia	3:01
9.	"Sola" (with Lenier)	Hernandez; Mesa; Bertran	Mauro "El Código Secreto"; Boris Arencibia	3:19
10.	"Y Ahora" (with Grupo Firme)	Hernandez; Mesa; Angel Sandoval; Bertran; Isael Gutierrez; Evert Gutierrez; Zaire Tasean Rivera	Mauro "El Código Secreto"; Angel Sanvodal; Isael Gutierrez; Evert Gutierrez	2:42
11.	"MX PR"	Hernandez; Mesa; Bertran	Mauro "El Código Secreto"; Boris Arencibia	2:13
Total length:				30:57

== Charts ==
Chart performance for Leyenda Viva
Chart (2023)	Peak position
US Top Latin Albums (Billboard)	19
US Latin Rhythm Albums (Billboard)	11
