= Yailin La Más Viral =

Dominican rapper and singer (born 2003)

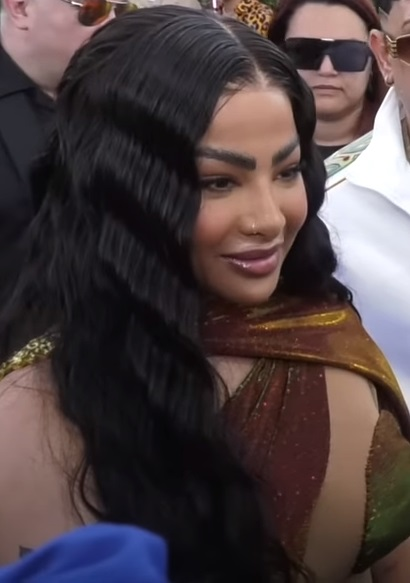
- Yailin La Más Viral in 2023

Background information
- Born: Jorgina Guillermo Díaz; 2001 or 2002 (age 24–25); Santo Domingo, Dominican Republic
- Genres: Dominican dembow; Latin trap; reggaeton
- Occupations: Rapper; singer
- Years active: 2019–present
- Label: Roc Nation
- Spouse: Anuel AA (m. 2022; div. 2024)

Jorgina Guillermo Díaz (born 2001 or 2002 (age 24–25)), known professionally as Yailin La Más Viral (Spanish for 'Yailin, the Most Viral One'), is a Dominican rapper and singer.

== Career ==
Guillermo is a dembow artist. Currently signed to Iris Live Music / Roc Nation Distribution, she released her first single in August 2020, "Quién Me Atraca a Mí" (remix) featuring Haraca Kiko under Gatty Music. In December 2020, she released "Yo No Me Voy Acostar" with Tokischa and La Perversa. She quickly gained popularity on TikTok in 2021 after releasing the hit song "Chivirika" with El Villano RD. In April 2022, Guillermo commenced her first concert tour in the United States.

On 1 April 2022, Anuel AA and Guillermo released their single "Si Tú Me Busca". The song was produced by Súbelo Neo.

In 2024, Guillermo collaborated with New York rapper Lil Tjay for the song "Step Up".

== Personal life ==
Yailin and Puerto Rican rapper Anuel AA publicly confirmed their relationship via a social media post in January 2022. Later in June 2022, the couple got married. In February 2023, the couple announced their separation. Their divorce became effective in February 2024. In March 2023, Yailin gave birth to the couple’s daughter, Cattaleya.

Later in 2023, Yailin began dating rapper 6ix9ine. In December 2023, she was arrested in Palm Beach County, Florida on charges of aggravated battery with a deadly weapon and obstructing justice in relation to an assault on the rapper outside of his home. Videos emerged of Yailin damaging the rapper's automobile and striking him with a piece of wood. She was booked into jail and subsequently released on a $9,000 bond. The case was later dismissed.

== Discography ==
=== Extended plays ===
Title	Album details
Resiliencia	Released: 3 April 2024; Labels: Iris Live Music, Inc.; Format: Digital download, streaming

=== Singles ===
==== As lead artist ====
List of singles as lead artist, showing year released, chart positions, and originating album
Title	Year	Peak chart positions			Album
Title	Year	RD	US Latin	SPA	Album
"Yo No Me Voy Acostar" (with Tokischa and La Perversa)	2020	—	—	—	Non-album singles
"Chivirika" (with El Villano RD or remix with Mariah Angeliq)	2021	—	—	—	Non-album singles
"Si Tu Me Busca" (with Anuel AA)	2022	—	12	97	Non-album singles
"Soy Mama (remix)" (with La Insuperable and Fariana)	2022	—	—	—	Non-album singles
"Del Kilo" (with Anuel AA and Treintisiete)	2022	20	—	—	LLNM2
"Solo Tu y Yo" (with Shadow Blow)	2023	15	—	—	Non-album singles
"Narcicista"	2023	—	—	—	Non-album singles
"Pa Ti" (with 6ix9ine)	2023	—	37	—	Leyenda Viva
"Shaka Laka" (with 6ix9ine featuring Kodak Black)	2023	—	—	—	Blackballed
"Feefafo" (with 6ix9ine and Ben El)	2023	—	—	—	Blackballed
"Bad Bxtch"	2023	—	—	—	Non-album singles
"Perdi Mi Tiempo"	2024	—	—	—	Non-album singles
"Dale 2" (with Kreizy K)	2024	16	—	—	Non-album singles
"Chapa" (with Puyalo Pantera)	2024	—	—	—	Non-album singles
"Bing Bong" (with Puyalo Pantera)	2024	8	28	—	Non-album singles
"Silla" (with Puyalo Pantera)	2024	—	—	—	Non-album singles

==== As featured artist ====
List of singles as featured artist, with selected chart positions
Title	Year	Peak chart positions			Album
Title	Year	RD	US Latin	SPA	Album
"Nataly" (Ceky Viciny, Melymel and La Perversa featuring Yailin La Más Viral and Shadow Blow)	2020	14	—	—	Non-album singles
"La Máquina" (Anuel AA, Jowell & Randy and De la Ghetto featuring Yailin La Más Viral)	2023	—	23	79	LLNM2
