= Gummo (song) =

2017 single by 6ix9ine

Single by 6ix9ine

from the album Day69
- Released: September 24, 2017
- Recorded: 2017
- Genre: Gangsta rap; trap; drill
- Length: 2:37
- Label: ScumGang; TenThousand Projects; Universal
- Songwriters: Daniel Hernandez; Jordan Jenks; Andrew Green
- Producer: Pi'erre Bourne

6ix9ine singles chronology
"Poles 1469" (2017)	"Gummo" (2017)	"Kooda" (2017)

Music video
- "Gummo" on YouTube

"Gummo" (stylized in all caps) is the debut solo single by American rapper 6ix9ine, released digitally on September 24, 2017, as the lead single from 6ix9ine's debut mixtape Day69 (2018). The single peaked at number 12 on the US Billboard Hot 100. "Gummo" was certified gold by the RIAA on January 11, 2018, platinum on March 5, and double platinum on December 14 with the song reaching two million copies sold.

The official remix features a guest appearance by Offset and is also included on the Day69 mixtape. A remix by Lil Wayne featuring Gudda Gudda appears on the Dedication 6: Reloaded mixtape hosted by DJ Drama.

== Background ==
"Gummo" was part of a concerted effort from 6ix9ine and his management to rebrand 6ix9ine's image from the punk, rap-rock aesthetic he had cultivated towards a more gangster rap sound.

The beat was produced by Pi'erre Bourne, and was originally intended for Trippie Redd. However, Trippie Redd instead gave the beat to 6ix9ine, who made it into a diss track aimed at Trippie Redd and SosMula.

== Release and music video ==
The music video was released on YouTube alongside digital releases. The music video features 6ix9ine and members of the Nine Trey Gangster Bloods street gang in Bed-Stuy, Brooklyn, New York. As of July 2026, it has over 467 million views.

6ix9ine would state about the song's impact, "I would pray every day: God, please change my life ... I got a baby; I can't even buy her Pampers ... please change my life, please change my life—and then 'Gummo' came and life changed."

During the Trial of the Nine Trey Gangsters that began a year and a month after the song released, 6ix9ine would reveal that a friend associated with the Bloods gang invited the gang members featured in the video to the shoot, at 6ix9ine's request. The gang members were initially hesitant to film with 6ix9ine, but were convinced by 6ix9ine "wining and dining" them, including buying bandanas and Hennessy bottles for them. It was during the video shoot that 6ix9ine would meet Kifano "Shotti" Jordan, a known Nine Trey Gangster member, who would go on to become his manager. Thus, Gummo marks the beginning of 6ix9ine's association with the Nine Trey Gangsters, as he testified during the trial.

== Commercial performance ==
"Gummo" debuted at number 58 on the Billboard Hot 100 for the week of December 2, 2017. It peaked at number 12 the week of December 30, remaining on the chart for twenty weeks. In Canada, the song debuted at number 72 on the Canadian Hot 100 the same week it first appeared on the Billboard Hot 100. It peaked at number 32 the week of March 10, and remained on the chart for twenty weeks.

== Remixes ==
The official remix features Offset and also is an included track on the Day69 mixtape. Meek Mill, Rick Ross and Rico Recklezz have made their own remixes to the song.

== Aftermath ==
Lyrics from "Gummo", as well as the circumstances of the song's creation, would later be used as evidence during the 2018 racketeering trial against the Nine Trey Gangsters.

in 2019, Jon Caramanica would state that "'Gummo' set in motion a parallel path for 6ix9ine. Within months, he was living two simultaneous lives — in public, one of the most vivid and promising new talents in hip-hop; in private, part of a gang that committed robberies, distributed drugs, shot at rivals and more."

== Charts ==
=== Weekly charts ===
Chart (2017–2018)	Peak position
Canada Hot 100 (Billboard)	32
Slovakia Singles Digital (ČNS IFPI)	72
US Billboard Hot 100	12
US Hot R&B/Hip-Hop Songs (Billboard)	5

=== Year-end charts ===
Chart (2018)	Position
Canada (Canadian Hot 100)	98
US Billboard Hot 100	56
US Hot R&B/Hip-Hop Songs (Billboard)	30

== Certifications ==
Region	Certification	Certified units/sales
Canada (Music Canada)	Platinum	80,000^{‡}
France (SNEP)	Gold	100,000^{‡}
Mexico (AMPROFON)	Gold	30,000^{‡}
Netherlands (NVPI)	Gold	20,000^{‡}
New Zealand (RMNZ)	Platinum	30,000^{‡}
Poland (ZPAV)	Gold	25,000^{‡}
United Kingdom (BPI)	Silver	200,000^{‡}
United States (RIAA)	2× Platinum	2,000,000^{‡}
^{‡} Sales+streaming figures based on certification alone.
