= 6ix9ine =

American rapper (born 1996)

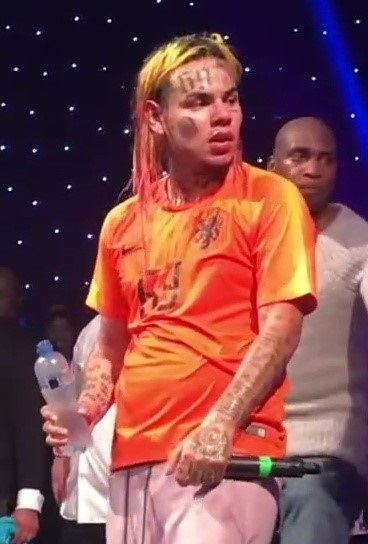
- Hernandez in 2018

Background information
- Also known as: Tekashi69; Tekashi 6ix9ine; Wallah Dan
- Born: Daniel Hernandez; May 8, 1996 (age 30); New York City, U.S.
- Genres: East Coast hip-hop; gangsta rap; scream rap; hardcore hip-hop; SoundCloud rap; punk rap; drill; trap; Latin urban
- Occupations: Rapper; songwriter
- Works: Discography
- Years active: 2012–present
- Labels: Giné; Create; 10K Projects; Virgin; Scumgang; Tr3yway
- Children: 3

Daniel Hernandez (born May 8, 1996), known professionally as 6ix9ine (pronounced "six nine"), Tekashi69, or Tekashi 6ix9ine, is an American rapper. His music has been marked by an aggressive style of rapping, while his controversial public persona is characterized by his distinctive rainbow-colored hair, tattoos, legal problems, social media "trolling", and publicized celebrity feuds.

Hernandez first became known for his guest performance on Trippie Redd's 2017 single "Poles 1469", followed by the release of his debut single, "Gummo" that same year, which was a sleeper hit, peaking at number 12 on the Billboard Hot 100. The latter preceded his debut mixtape Day69 (2018), which was further supported by the singles "Kooda", "Keke" (with Fetty Wap and A Boogie wit da Hoodie), and "Gotti", all of which entered the Hot 100. "Fefe" (featuring Nicki Minaj and Murda Beatz), the second single from his debut album Dummy Boy (2018), peaked at number three on the chart. Despite negative critical reception, Dummy Boy peaked at number two on the Billboard 200 and received platinum certification by the Recording Industry Association of America (RIAA).

In 2015, Hernandez pleaded guilty to a felony count of use of a child in a sexual performance and was sentenced to a four-year probation period and a 1,000-hour community service order. In 2018, Hernandez, his manager Kifano "Shotti" Jordan, and 10 other members of the Nine Trey Gangsters faction of the United Blood Nation street gang were arrested and charged with racketeering and various felony crimes. Hernandez received a 2-year prison sentence in December 2019 after turning state's evidence against the gang and its members. In April 2020, he was put on house arrest for the remainder of his sentence and was released that August.

Hernandez briefly maintained commercial success following his release, with his 2020 singles "Gooba" and "Trollz" (with Nicki Minaj) peaking at number three and one on the Hot 100, respectively. His second album, TattleTales (2020), debuted at number four on the Billboard 200 and his third album Leyenda Viva (2023)—his first reggaeton album—failed to make any worldwide chart impact. Due to his role as an informant in the Nine Trey Gangsters trial, several hip-hop figures and outlets condemned or ostracized Hernandez, who argued Hernandez associated with, provided financial compensation to, and committed crimes with gang members solely to gain street credibility and further his rap career, leading to lasting damage to his public image.

== Early life ==
Daniel Hernandez was born on May 8, 1996, in the Bushwick neighborhood of Brooklyn, New York City, to Natividad Perez-Hernandez, a factory worker and house cleaner from Atlixco, Puebla, Mexico, and Daniel Hernandez Sr., from Río Piedras, Puerto Rico.

Hernandez and his older brother, Oscar Hernandez, were raised in a church throughout their youth. He went to elementary school at Public School 59. He went to middle school at Juan Morel Campos Secondary School. He went to high school at Legacy High School. He left high school around the tenth grade.

Hernandez did not know his father until he was 9 years old and had only a brief relationship with him. Hernandez's mother told him he was dead, according to Hernandez's father. Hernandez's father had a heroin addiction and was in prison for five years for selling drugs. Hernandez's stepfather, who also was Puerto Rican, was shot dead steps away from the family home in 2010. After the murder of his stepfather, Hernandez "spiraled into a deep depression", and would not shower or eat. Hernandez also started to act out due to his stepfather's death and was eventually expelled from school in the 8th grade for bad behavior. Rather than continuing his education, he started working various jobs such as being a busboy.

== Music career ==
=== 2012–2016: Early career ===
Hernandez first decided to rap in 2012 after meeting Peter "Righteous P" Rodgers, CEO of New York record label Hikari-Ultra, when he came into the vegan bodega Hernandez was working at in Bushwick, Brooklyn, and asked if Hernandez rapped based on his appearance, stating that he thought he had the image of a rapper and suggested that he rap because of this, along with Hernandez' cadence.

Hernandez began releasing rap songs in 2014, starting with "69" (which inspired the shortened version of his full stage name) in August 2014, "Pimpin", in September 2014, and both "Who The Fuck is You" and "4769" in October 2014, the latter of which was his first collaboration as a lead artist featuring two rappers from the Brooklyn collective Pro Era, J.A.B. and Dirty Sanchez. Over the next three years, he released multiple tracks and videos with titles such as "Scumlife", "Shinigami" (named after the Japanese death god Shinigami from Death Note), "Yokai" and "Hellsing Station", drawing attention for his aggressive rapping style and use of anime as music video visuals. Many of his early songs were released by FCK THEM, a music label based in Slovakia. He adopted the stage name "Tekashi69"; "Tekashi" references Japanese anime, which he was a fan of, while "69" references both the 69 sex position and the yin-yang symbol.

Gathering fame as an internet meme for his rainbow-dyed hair, extensive tattoos, and rainbow-plated grills, he eventually became an associate of fellow New York rapper ZillaKami, the younger half-brother of Righteous P. They later feuded after Hernandez discovered Righteous P and ZillaKami were going to sign a record deal with Epic, in an attempt by ZillaKami to drop him due to a lack of control over Hernandez, alleged unpaid bail money, the surfacing of misconduct allegations against Hernandez, and a dispute over allegedly stolen instrumentals. Soon after Hernandez began working with Andrew Green a rapper known as TrifeDrew, again, who had previously worked with him on music videos to work on videos again along with music.

=== 2017–2018: Day69, Dummy Boy, Nine Trey Gangsters affiliation ===
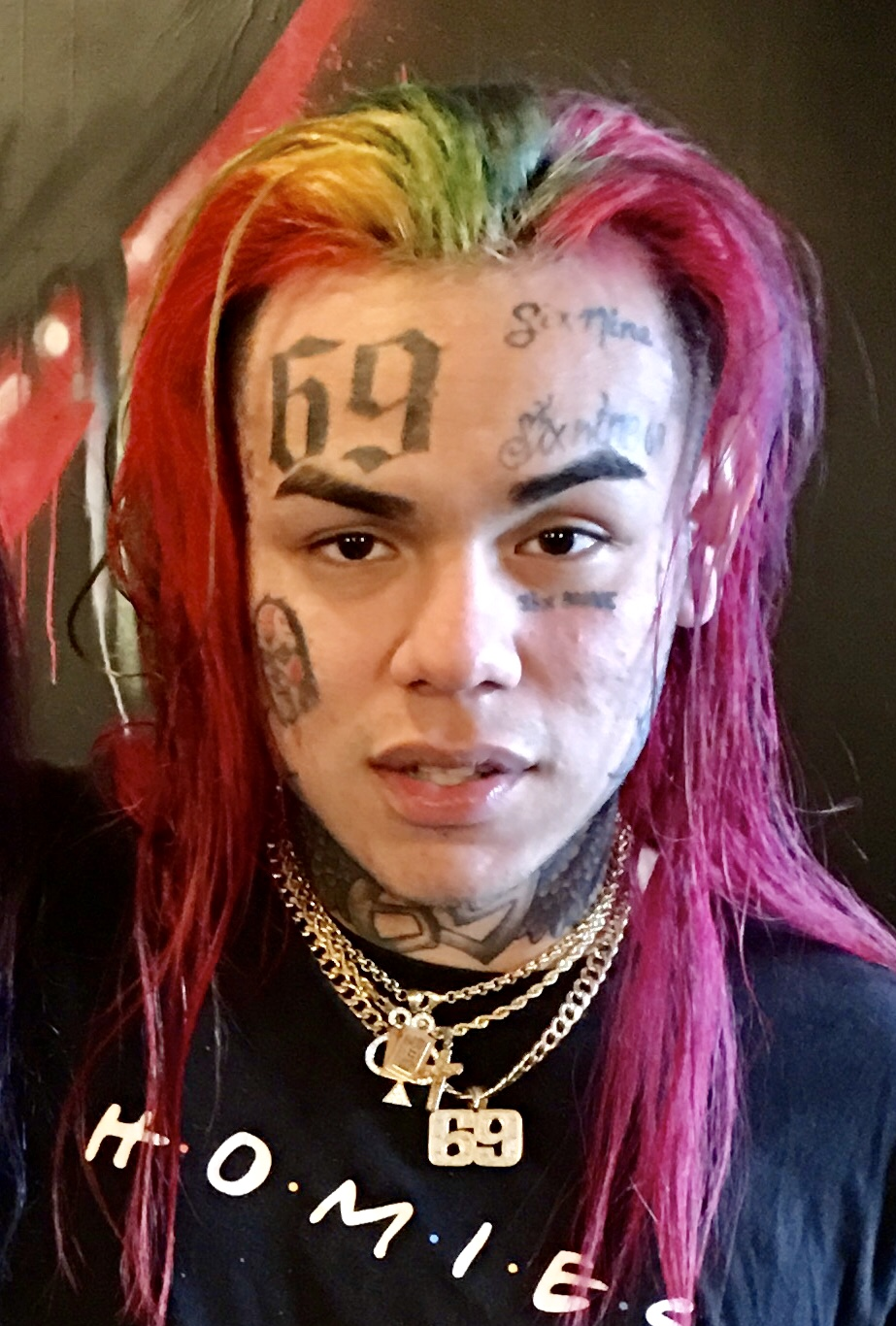
Hernandez displaying his rainbow-colored hair in November 2017

"Poles 1469", released in April 2017, featured Hernandez alongside Trippie Redd on YouTube. Hernandez rose to prominence on social media due to a July 2017 Instagram post that went viral on both Reddit and Twitter. Hernandez's commercial debut single "Gummo" was released on November 10, 2017, and eventually peaked at number 12 on the US Billboard Hot 100. It was certified platinum by the RIAA on March 5, 2018. His next single, "Kooda", debuted at number 61 on the Hot 100 the week of December 23, 2017. On January 14, 2018, Hernandez released his third single, "Keke", with Fetty Wap and A Boogie wit da Hoodie, which also charted on the Hot 100.

"Gummo" was part of an effort from Hernandez and his management to rebrand Hernandez's image from the punk, rap-rock aesthetic he had cultivated, and a fanbase mostly in European countries such as Slovakia, towards a more gangster rap, American, and "urban" sound. Hernandez would state in a 2020 interview with The New York Times, "I was killing the European market. But when you're a kid from New York, you don't want to be the kid that is only being played in Slovakia. I want to go outside in New York and hear my music. I want to go to the club and hear my music blasting through those speakers. What's the point of doing something and you're not the best at doing it in your hometown?"

During the "Gummo" video shoot, which featured Hernandez rapping amidst members of the Nine Trey Gangster Bloods street gang, the rapper would meet Kifano "Shotti" Jordan, a known Nine Trey Gangsters member and founder of the record label "Tr3yway Entertainment". Shotti would become closely associated with Hernandez, becoming his manager and bodyguard, and introduced Hernandez to other Nine Trey Gangsters members. Hernandez and the Nine Trey Gangsters forged a partnership, with Hernandez receiving, in his words, "career, credibility, street credibility, videos, music, and protection" from the gang, while Hernandez financially compensated Shotti and the gang's members. The New York Times and Complex described Hernandez as a "cash cow" for the Bloods, and Hernandez would later describe himself in testimony as being extorted by the gang. Reflecting on this period, Jon Caramanica would write, "'Gummo' set in motion a parallel path for 6ix9ine. Within months, he was living two simultaneous lives — in public, one of the most vivid and promising new talents in hip-hop; in private, part of a gang that committed robberies, distributed drugs, shot at rivals and more." Throughout 2018, backed by his supposed gang affiliation, Hernandez engaged in numerous online feuds, "trolled" on social media, and generated controversies in order to increase record sales.

Shortly afterward, Hernandez announced his second mixtape, Day69. The mixtape was released on February 23, 2018, and debuted at number 4 on the Billboard 200 album chart with 55,000 album-equivalent units, of which 20,000 were pure sales. According to Jon Caramanica of The New York Times, the tape was an outgrowth of the "SoundCloud rap explosion" and was notable for its willingness to deviate from hip-hop's prevailing sound. After the release of Day69, two songs from the album, "Billy" and "Rondo" both debuted on the Billboard Hot 100, with "Billy" peaking at number 50 and "Rondo" at number 73.

In April 2018, Hernandez released "Gotti", a remix of a feature he did for artist Packman titled "Got it, Got it". The song's video was released on April 16, 2018, and involved footage of Hernandez donating bundles of $100 bills to poor citizens in the Dominican Republic. The song was added to Day69 as a deluxe song and debuted at number 99 on the Billboard Hot 100 before dropping off the following week, making it his sixth consecutive Hot 100 entry.

After being involved in a shooting at the Barclays Center, Hernandez stopped releasing music for several months, before releasing "Tati", featuring DJ Spinking in June, which debuted at number 43 on the Billboard Hot 100.

In July 2018, Hernandez released his eighth single, "Fefe", featuring Nicki Minaj and Murda Beatz; the single debuted at number four on the Billboard Hot 100 before peaking at number three in its second week, marking Hernandez's highest entry on the chart and his first single to reach the top five of the Hot 100. "Fefe" was later certified double platinum by the Recording Industry Association of America. His subsequent singles, "Bebe" and "Stoopid", also reached the top 30 of the Hot 100.

In September 2018, Hernandez signed a publishing deal with LA-based music company Create Music Group. In early October 2018, Hernandez was featured on the song "Aulos Reloaded" with French house DJ Vladimir Cauchemar and "Kick" with Danish singer Jimilian.

On November 7, 2018, it was announced that his debut studio album, Dummy Boy, was to be released on November 23, but on November 21, it was announced that the album would be postponed. The album was ultimately released without notice on November 27, on all streaming services. Despite generally negative critical reception, the album became his highest-charting, after debuting at number two on the Billboard 200 behind Travis Scott's Astroworld. While in jail, 6ix9ine was featured on previous collaborator A Boogie wit da Hoodie's song "Swervin", peaking at number 27 on the Hot 100, off his sophomore album Hoodie SZN. The song was released on December 21, 2018, alongside the album.

Hernandez's rise during the 2017-2018 period of his career was described by the New York Times as "meteoric", while music publication Pitchfork wrote that Hernandez was "one of the industry's biggest success stories of the year".

=== 2019–present: Return to music and follow-up projects ===
In October 2019, Hernandez signed a two-album contract for over $10 million with his label 10K Projects for one album in English and one album in Spanish.

In April 2020, Hernandez had to request permission from a judge to film a video in his backyard while in home confinement and was granted permission. On May 7, 2020, Hernandez announced he would be releasing a new single on May 8, 2020, marking his return to music and on his 24th birthday. The song, titled "Gooba", was released alongside a music video. According to Pitchfork's Madison Bloom, the track includes references to COVID-19 ("They sick, been hot, way before coronavirus") and Hernandez's cooperation with federal prosecutors and testimony ("Tell me how I ratted, came home to a big bag").

Hernandez announced after several delays his next single "Trollz", a collaboration with Nicki Minaj, which was released on June 12, 2020. The song debuted at the top of the Hot 100, marking 6ix9ine's first number-one single. "Trollz" fell to number 34 in its second week, breaking the record for the largest position drop from number one in the chart's history, however, the record was broken again later that year by Taylor Swift with "Willow". A third single, "Yaya", was released on July 3, 2020. It debuted at number 99 on the Billboard Hot 100 and dropped out of the charts the following week. A fourth single, "Punani", was released on August 2.

The songs are all included on his second studio album, TattleTales, which was released on September 4, 2020. After the release of the album Hernandez lamented the treatment he received from music platforms Spotify and Apple Music with them not displaying that he had released a new album on the main pages of their store fronts and not including him in their playlists which are highly influential on the charts, with him explaining that he views this as the music industry using these platforms' influence to damage him as a result of him cooperating. In November 2020, Hernandez was profiled in a Hulu true crime documentary film, 69: The Saga of Danny Hernandez. While archival footage of Hernandez is featured, he was not interviewed for the film.

On February 19, 2021, he returned with the track, "Zaza", notably throwing jabs at Lil Durk and Meek Mill, whom he has feuded with. The song debuted at number 90 on the Hot 100. Also in 2021, Wack 100 officially became his manager.

On April 15, 2022, he released the song "Giné", throwing jabs at Lil Durk again, as well as King Von. The song was also released in collaboration with Giné energy drink, for which 6ix9ine made a new drink with the company.

Hernandez's third full-length LP Leyenda Viva, his first full reggaeton album, was released as a surprise album on June 16, 2023, but neither the album nor its singles—"Bori", "Wapae", "Y Ahora", "Pa Ti", and "Dueño"—appeared on any major chart. He would also release his latest effort Blackballed in December without any prior announcement, and the EP would also fail to achieve any commercial or critical success.

== Artistry ==
=== Musical style and influences ===
"Billy"
6ix9ine's song "Billy" mentions his gang Treyway, but 6ix9ine was later legally prohibited from mentioning the gang in his songs after an October 2018 settlement.

Hernandez's music is generally categorized as hip-hop, or more specifically, scream rap, hardcore hip-hop, SoundCloud rap, and punk rap, often incorporating elements of drill, heavy metal, hardcore punk, grime, crunk, trap music, and reggaeton. Some of his favorite musical artists include rappers and metalcore bands such as DMX, Tupac Shakur, Parkway Drive, All That Remains, the Notorious B.I.G., and 50 Cent.

== Legal problems ==
Prior to his charges and crimes in his adult life, Hernandez served jail time as a minor for assault and the sale of heroin.

=== 2015: Child sexual performance ===
Hernandez was involved in a child sexual performance charge from 2015. In October 2015, Hernandez pled guilty to a felony count of use of a child in a sexual performance. He was charged with three counts of the offense after a February 2015 incident in which he had physical contact with a 13-year-old girl and later distributed videos of the incident online as part of a music video. Three videos are described in the criminal complaint against Hernandez. In the first, "the child engages in oral sexual intercourse with the separately charged defendant Taquan Anderson, while the defendant, Daniel Hernandez, stands behind the child making a thrusting motion with his pelvis and smacking her on her buttocks. The child is nude in the video". The other videos show the child sitting on Hernandez's lap while Anderson gropes her breasts and later sitting naked across the laps of Anderson and Hernandez.

As reported in Rolling Stone, Hernandez told police in 2015, "When she came in she asked me how old I was and I told her I was 18 and I assumed she was older ... The way she was asking made me think she was older." In a November 2017 interview, Hernandez claimed to have had "no sexual contact" with the girl and denied knowing she was a minor. Hernandez also claimed to have been 17 at the time of the incident, though the birth date listed in the complaint against him and in his statement to the police shows he was 18.

At his sentencing, assistant DA Sara Weiss told the court that Hernandez fondled the child's breasts and smacked her buttocks while she was raped by two other men.

Under his plea deal, Hernandez must obtain his GED, refrain from posting sexually explicit or violent images of women or children to social media and not commit another crime for two years, among other injunctions. If met, the plea deal will give Hernandez three years' probation and he will not have to register as a sex offender; if not, Hernandez could face up to three years in prison. In a January 2018 court hearing, it was revealed that Hernandez had failed his GED test, but had his sentencing postponed until April 10, 2018. The court date was later postponed, reportedly because the court did not have a copy of Hernandez's GED.

Due to his continuing legal problems in light of his plea bargain, the Manhattan district attorney's office announced Hernandez could face up to three years in prison and possible sex offender registration for his 2015 case, but he was instead sentenced to four years of probation starting in October 2018, with one clause being that he must not promote gang activity, as well as perform 1,000 hours of community service.

=== 2017–2018: Violent and gang-related incidents ===
==== LAX brawl ====
Per TMZ, Hernandez and his crew were involved in a "massive brawl" at Los Angeles International Airport (LAX) on February 21, 2018.

==== Robbery of rival ====
In April 2018, Hernandez, Shotti, and other Nine Trey Gangsters members would rob a rival rapper whom they erroneously believed was affiliated with Rap-A-Lot Records. Hernandez filmed this act, and was later sued for his involvement in the robbery in December 2020. Complex reported that this incident would play a central role in the racketeering case against the Nine Trey Gangsters, with the incident being "Counts 3, 4, and 5 of the indictment against Shotti, Ish, Crippy, and 6ix9ine". Hernandez would testify that, after committing the robbery and while attempting to flee in their getaway car, Hernandez and his crew heard police sirens, and Shotti forced Hernandez out of the car with the gun used to commit the crime.

==== Assaults ====
In May 2018, during an arrest for driving on a suspended license, Hernandez was accused of "squeezing" a police officer's hand, and was charged with obstructing governmental administration and assault. He received a one year probation for disorderly conduct.

On July 12, 2018, Hernandez was arrested in New York for an outstanding warrant related to an incident where he allegedly choked a 16-year-old in The Galleria shopping mall in Houston in January 2018. All charges were eventually dropped after the teenager decided not to take legal action.

==== Victim of robbery, assault and kidnapping against ====
In the early morning hours of July 22, 2018, Hernandez was kidnapped, beaten and robbed by three armed assailants in Brooklyn. He had finished shooting the music video for "FEFE" (featuring Nicki Minaj and Murda Beatz) when the assailants grabbed him outside his home and pistol-whipped him. The robbers eventually took over $750,000 in custom jewelry and approximately $35,000 in cash. Hernandez escaped from their vehicle and summoned police help via a stranger. He was taken to the hospital. In February 2019, Nine Trey Gangsters member Anthony "Harv" Ellison was indicted for the July kidnapping and assault. On October 3, Ellison was found guilty.

==== Shootings ====
In 2018, Hernandez was involved in at least five shooting incidents.

On April 21, 2018, Hernandez was involved in a shooting at the Barclays Center with the entourage of fellow New York rapper Casanova, as part of a feud. This led to Hernandez losing a $5 million headphone deal and being banned from the Barclays Center. A Nine Trey Gangsters member was accused of committing the shooting, and plead guilty to the crime on May 9, 2019. U.S. Attorney Geoffrey S. Berman stated, "Today, Fuguan Lovick admitted to a brazen and dangerous act of violence. While inside the Barclays Center with Tekashi 6ix9ine and other Nine Trey gang members, Lovick fired a gun to intimidate rival gang members. We continue our daily work with our law enforcement partners to keep our communities safe and to vigorously investigate acts of violence committed by gang members."

On June 2, 2018, Chief Keef was fired upon outside the W Hotel in New York City but not hit; no injuries resulted from the incident. Due to the ongoing feud, Hernandez was confirmed to be under investigation by the New York Police Department for possible involvement with the incident. In February 2019, Hernandez pled guilty to ordering the shooting of Chief Keef. Hernandez offered his associate Kintea "Kooda B" McKenzie $20,000 to shoot at Chief Keef.

On August 5, 2018, a shooting occurred on the set of a music video Hernandez was filming with rapper 50 Cent.

On October 27, 2018, two members of Hernandez's entourage were involved in a shooting in Manhattan and were subsequently charged with gang assault. The New York Times would later report that the incident was catalyzed by tension and disagreement between Hernandez's "legitimate" industry boss Elliot Grainge, who had signed Hernandez to his label 10K Projects before Hernandez was well known, and his "street" manager Kifano "Shotti" Jordan, who became involved with Hernandez following his first hit single. When Hernandez met Elliot Grainge at the restaurant Philippe to celebrate a legal victory in his 2015 sex crimes case, Shotti and other Nine Trey members entered the meeting uninvited. This resulted in a scuffle and shooting between Nine Trey Gangsters and Grainge's private security.

On November 9, 2018, Hernandez was filming a music video with rapper Kanye West in Beverly Hills, California, when shots were fired at the house they were shooting the music video in. No one was injured and no arrests were made. West would state on Twitter "Thank you for everyone's prayers. Our family is safe and close."

=== 2018–2019: Trial of the Nine Trey Gangsters, domestic violence ===
On November 16, 2018, Hernandez made his second appearance on The Breakfast Club radio show, in which he notably stated: "There's only one thing I fear in life. No, two things. I fear God and I fear the FBI". On November 18, 2018, Hernandez, his former faux-manager Kifano "Shotti" Jordan and three other associates were arrested. Hernandez was charged with federal RICO and firearms charges, including conspiracy to murder and armed robbery. He was allegedly part of "a violent sect of the Bloods" known as the Nine Trey Gangsters.

Hernandez's attorney, Lance Lazzaro, advocated for bail for his client on the condition that Hernandez surrender his passport, pay a little under $2 million for bail and be placed under house arrest, but the judge denied bail, keeping Hernandez in custody, surmising that he may still be a danger to the community even if those bail conditions were met. Hernandez's legal team planned to appeal that decision. He was held at the Metropolitan Detention Center in Brooklyn under general population before being moved to another facility due to security reasons, as Hernandez had multiple altercations with fellow prisoners, including those belonging to the Crips street gang.

Hernandez was due to be sentenced on January 24, 2020, and faced a possible mandatory sentence of 47 years in prison. On February 1, 2019, Hernandez pled guilty to nine charges, and turned state's evidence, agreeing to testify against his co-defendants.The New York Times noted that Hernandez was "cordial and relaxed" in court as he discussed the gang's inner workings and crimes, dropping his public persona. Hernandez's decision to "snitch", and in particular his testimonies about rappers uninvolved with the trial, including rappers Cardi B, Jim Jones, and Trippie Redd, provoked discussion, amusement, and condemnations from hip-hop personalities and fans, and inspired internet memes.

By December 2019, Hernandez was praised by prosecutors for his work in the court room informing on his former associates, who asked the judge for leniency in Hernandez's sentencing. Prosecutors stated that Hernandez was able to provide "an insider's view of Nine Trey and a firsthand account of many acts of violence" that the government was heretofore not privy to.

On December 18, 2019, Hernandez was given a sentence of 2 years after testifying against the Nine Trey Gangsters. Judge Paul Engelmayer gave Hernandez credit for helping prosecutors send several violent gang members to prison and 13 months time served.

On December 18, 2019, Hernandez's father showed up to his court hearing after not seeing him since he was 9 years old, causing the rapper to break down in tears. His father told reporters he wants to repair his relationship with his son.

On March 22, 2020, while serving his time in prison, Hernandez requested to serve the remainder of his prison sentence at home stating he was at a higher risk of contracting the COVID-19 virus due to his pre-existing asthma condition. On April 1, 2020 Rolling Stone obtained a letter to the judge from United States Attorney Geoffrey Berman saying that the government does not object to the release of Hernandez early on home confinement. On Thursday, April 2, Hernandez's lawyer, Dawn Florio, confirmed with XXL magazine that the court decided to allow the rapper to be released from prison and into home confinement. He was originally set to be released on August 2, 2020. His home confinement ended on August 1, 2020. However, he was still required to remain on supervised release.

==== Domestic violence and alleged sexual assault ====
On September 10, 2019, Hernandez admitted to years of domestic violence in a cooperation agreement in his trial, including domestic violence Hernandez admitted he had committed "from 2011 to November 2018". Accusations of domestic violence were detailed in early 2019 in a Daily Beast article that featured testimony from the rapper's ex-girlfriend and mother of his daughter, Sara Molina, that he beat her in several incidents. As stated to the Daily Beast, Molina alleged Hernandez had sexually assaulted her.

Hernandez admitted and discussed physically abusing his ex-girlfriend in interviews with The New York Times and The Shade Room in 2020.

=== 2021–2024: Lawsuits, LA Fitness attack, arrests in Dominican Republic and New York ===
==== Lawsuits ====
Hernandez was sued in 2021 by a Miami dancer who alleged that Hernandez threw a bottle at her head, "causing serious and permanent bodily injury". After Hernandez failed to show up to court, the dancer was awarded $10 million in damages. Upon appeal in 2023, a Florida judge vacated the judgment and ordered that a receiver be discharged from moving forward with seizing any assets.

Hernandez was also at the center of a legal battle between two vape companies that had conflicted business dealings with Hernandez.

In July 2021, a Brooklyn-based Japanese tattoo artist sued Hernandez for allegedly making false and defamatory statements about him. The artist, whose name is phonetically similar to "Tekashi", claimed that Hernandez exploited his name and likeness when Hernandez adopted Tekashi as a stage name. The lawsuit also cited a documentary interview in which Hernandez claimed that the artist used heroin. In August 2023, the artist sought a default judgment after Hernandez's attorney withdrew from the case.

In September 2024, Hernandez's ex-girlfriend, Dominican rapper Yailin La Más Viral, sued Hernandez, alleging "a history of physical, emotional, sexual, and financial abuse." In response, Hernandez posted on Instagram, "it is better to go against the devil than to go against me."

==== Florida: LA Fitness attack on 6ix9ine; traffic citations ====
In March 2023, Hernandez was reportedly assaulted inside a steam room at an LA Fitness gym in Lake Worth Beach, Florida. Videos of the attack were shared on social media. Hernandez sustained facial cuts and had to be hospitalized. Three men were eventually arrested and charged for the assault, including a father and son. In January 2025, Tekashi filed a negligence claim in Palm Beach County, Florida, suing LA Fitness for more than $1 million, alleging the gym failed to provide adequate security during the March 2023 attack.

In August 2023 it was reported that Hernandez was arrested after failing to appear in court for several traffic citations in Florida including driving at 136 mph (219 km/h) in a 65 mph (105 km/h) zone in an unregistered vehicle without insurance.

==== Dominican Republic assault arrest ====
On October 15, 2023, Hernandez was arrested in Sánchez, Dominican Republic on suspicion of assaulting two music producers.

==== Domestic violence against 6ix9ine ====
In December 2023, Hernandez's girlfriend, Yailin La Más Viral (real name Georgina Lulú Guillermo Díaz), was arrested in Palm Beach, Florida on charges of aggravated battery with a deadly weapon and obstructing justice in relation to an assault on Hernandez outside of his home. Videos emerged of Guillermo damaging the rapper's automobile and striking him with a piece of wood. She was booked into jail and subsequently released on a $9,000 bond following a court hearing.

==== Dominican Republic domestic violence arrest ====
On January 17, 2024, Hernandez was arrested by Dominican authorities on charges of domestic violence. He was held in a jail in Santo Domingo and a hearing was set for January 18 to decide if he would be freed on bond or remain arrested. On January 25, 2024, he was released on the condition that he undergo government counseling and meet with authorities every two months until they conclude their investigation and ordered to pay a $510 deposit.

==== New York arrest ====
On October 29, 2024, Hernandez was arrested in New York on a warrant which was issued by the U.S. District Court for the Southern District of New York after being charged with violating the terms of his supervised release, which was 6 months away from expiring. Hernandez had been on supervised release from his previous prison sentence since April 2020. Hernandez left the state to go to Las Vegas without permission, showed up an hour late for court and tested positive for meth twice. He was held at the Metropolitan Detention Center until November 12.

On January 6, 2026, Hernandez surrendered to federal authorities to begin his three-month sentence at the Metropolitan Detention Center before being released on April 3, leaving the facility with a SpongeBob SquarePants doll that he claims was signed by Venezuelan president Nicolás Maduro, who was being held on pretrial detention following his seizure by U.S. forces earlier in the year.

== Personal life ==
In September 2022, Hernandez became the goalkeeper of the Russian media football team GOATS.

Hernandez is Christian.

=== Relationships ===
At 18 years old, Hernandez had a daughter with ex-girlfriend Sara Molina. Hernandez has another daughter who was born November 19, 2018, with Marlayna M.

In 2023, Hernandez began a relationship with Dominican rapper and singer Yailin La Más Viral (Georgina Guillermo Díaz). She was previously involved with Hernandez's collaborator-turned-rival, Anuel AA. By September 2024, Yailin La Más Viral was reported to be Hernandez's ex-girlfriend.

=== Health ===
Hernandez has asthma.

On October 1, 2020, Hernandez was reportedly hospitalized after having an overdose from mixing two Hydroxycut diet pills with a McDonald's McCafé coffee, though his lawyer denies this claim.

== Feuds ==
Throughout Hernandez's mainstream breakout in 2018, which Pitchfork described as "one of the industry's biggest success stories of the year", Hernandez frequently engaged in "trolling" and feuded with others on social media, bolstered and backed by his supposed gang affiliation. As reported in The New York Times, prosecutors in late 2018 would take note of this, stating, "Mr. Hernandez had acknowledged being a member of the 9 Trey Bloods, a violent gang, and had used online 'trolling' to increase record sales and to start feuds or 'beefs' with other recording artists throughout the country." Pitchfork's Stephen Kearse placed his antics in the wider context of rappers across 2018 using "trolling" as a career gimmick, and would write, "Anyone who's ever watched a Smack DVD, browsed WorldStarHipHop, or scrolled through Vine knows how hackneyed 6ix9ine's flexing is. In the past, his antics likely would have sunken to the depths of the content ocean only to be occasionally salvaged for a meme or joke."

=== Trippie Redd ===
In April 2017, Hernandez and Trippie Redd released their first collaboration, "Poles 1469" and in July 2017, they released another, "Owee". Following a post from a Twitter account claiming Hernandez was a pedophile, Redd denounced Hernandez. On November 11, 2017, following a series of barbs the two traded on social media, Redd was attacked in the lobby of a New York hotel and blamed Hernandez and his crew in an Instagram live video. The two would continue to trade shots on social media in February and March 2018.

Hernandez accused Redd of having sexual relations with fellow rapper Danielle Bregoli, also known as Bhad Bhabie, who was a minor at the time. Redd and Bregoli denied the accusation, but the latter admitted that the two had kissed in the past: "We kissed but it wasn't that serious and he was 17 at the time."

In September 2018, Hernandez posted videos of himself with Redd's ex, hinting at sexual activity between the two. During his RICO trial, Hernandez testified that Trippie Redd was a gang member.

=== Rap-A-Lot Records ===
Hernandez would testify during his 2018 racketeering trial about his and the Nine Trey Gangsters feud with Houston, Texas based record label Rap-A-Lot Records, headed by James Prince. According to The New York Times, "his dispute with Rap-A-Lot stemmed from a disregard by his associates for the gang tradition of 'checking in' when visiting another city", and Hernandez further testified that "checking in" referred to paying respects to the gang of another city when entering that city. Hernandez testified that in March 2018, Rap-A-Lot prevented Hernandez from performing at the South by Southwest (SXSW) festival in Austin, resulting in a missed paycheck for the rapper, and that he and the Nine Trey Gangsters decided to retaliate by robbing Rap-A-Lot associates in New York. Two such persons were mistaken by Hernandez and his crew to be Rap-A-Lot affiliates, and robbed in April 2018. Footage of this was posted by DJ Akademiks, where it went viral.

=== Chief Keef ===
Throughout 2018, Hernandez was involved in feuds with a number of Chicago drill artists from the GloGang collective, including Chief Keef, Lil Reese and Tadoe (Chief Keef's cousin), stemming from domestic abuse and relationship issues relating to fellow rapper Cuban Doll, who was in a relationship with Tadoe but also friendly with Hernandez. Hernandez antagonized Keef and his crew on social media, including driving to Chief Keef's old neighborhood of Parkway Gardens in Chicago and taunting him. According to DJ Vlad, Hernandez stated on social media that he had visited Parkway Gardens at 10 PM, but security footage showed him arriving and quickly leaving at 3 AM. In the midst of the beef, Chief Keef stated, "That man with the cops, man. He on some police shit ... He trying to send somebody to jail. Motherfuckers ain't on that."

In June 2018, Chief Keef was shot at while leaving a hotel in New York (no one was injured), and Hernadez testified during his racketeering trial that he had ordered and paid for the shooting. In the summer of 2018, Trippie Redd released the song "I Kill People", featuring Chief Keef and Tadoe, which was aimed as a diss toward Hernandez.

=== Ariana Grande and Justin Bieber ===
In May 2020, 6ix9ine accused singers Justin Bieber and Ariana Grande of cheating and buying their way to number one on the Billboard Hot 100, after their song "Stuck with U" debuted at number one while his comeback single, "Gooba", debuted at number three for the week ending May 23, 2020. He also accused Billboard of chart manipulation. In an Instagram post, 6ix9ine alleged that Grande and Bieber were using "six credit cards" to purchase 30,000 copies of their song at the last minute.

Both Grande and Bieber denied the allegations. Bieber would address 6ix9ine's claims of that his streams did not count, stating that "he (6ix9ine) is counting his global streams and this is a domestic chart so only domestic streams count".

Billboard also stated how they conducted that week's charts, and that the forecast rankings that 6ix9ine had prior to the reveal were false, stating that they do not distribute any of their rankings to labels, management, or artists.

In a later interview with The New York Times asking him if he inflates his streams "through bots or pre-roll ads or dirty marketing tactics", Hernandez stated:

I'll say the same thing I said to Billboard: Who doesn't? Everybody inflates their numbers. Ev-er-y-bod-y.

=== Other feuds ===
In 2018, Hernandez was involved in a feud with fellow New York rapper Casanova, which led to a shooting incident between both of their entourages at the Barclays Center. Their beef was "squashed" in the same year.

Since his early prison release in April 2020, Hernandez has antagonized and been engaged in a number of feuds, with among others, Meek Mill, 50 Cent, Anuel AA, YG, Rich the Kid, Future, Fivio Foreign, Yailin La Más Viral, and Lil Tjay. Hernandez has attempted to feud with Chicago drill artists King Von and Lil Durk. Lil Durk claimed Hernandez's record label tried to pay him $3 million to continue their dispute. Lil Tjay made similar claims.

== Philanthropy ==
In March 2018, Hernandez visited the Dominican Republic to shoot a music video. While there, Hernandez handed out $100 bills to residents in the area. In the midst of his feud with Chief Keef on June 12, 2018, Hernandez visited Chicago's South Side and gave food and cash handouts to local residents. On July 24, 2018, Hernandez announced that a percentage of proceeds from sales of his Nicki Minaj-assisted hit single "Fefe" would be donated to various youth programs in New York. A portion of the proceeds from their 2020 single, "Trollz", was donated to The Bail Project to support people arrested during the George Floyd protests. On October 22, 2018, Hernandez met and spent the day with Tati, an eight-year-old Brooklyn girl terminally ill with brain cancer whose wish was to meet him. Hernandez took her out for a shopping spree.

On February 10, 2019, a video surfaced of Hernandez in an anti-violence against women commercial for Romantic Depot, a New York-based sex shop and lingerie store chain. The commercial video was released on Valentine's Day and went viral on TMZ and other celebrity news sites. The start of the video states "In no way does Romantic Depot support Tekashi 6IX9INE's past activities", which include domestic violence and alleged sexual assault against his ex-girlfriend.

After returning from prison in 2020, Hernandez intended on donating $200,000 from the $2 million he had earned from "Gooba" to No Kid Hungry. However, No Kid Hungry's director of strategic communications stated that the organization was declining the donation, saying "We are grateful for Mr. Hernandez's generous offer to donate to No Kid Hungry but we have informed his representatives that we have declined this donation...As a child-focused campaign, it is our policy to decline funding from donors whose activities do not align with our mission and values." Hernandez responded on Instagram, saying "@nokidhungry rather take food out the mouth of these innocent children I never seen something so cruel".

== Discography ==
Studio albums

- Dummy Boy (2018)
- TattleTales (2020)
- Leyenda Viva (2023)

== Tours ==
- World Domination Tour (2018)
