= WorldStarHipHop =

Video news aggregator

- Website type: Entertainment
- Owner: MediaLab AI Inc.
- Founder: Lee O'Denat
- Website: worldstarhiphop.com
- Commercial: Yes
- Registration: Optional
- Launched: August 9, 2005; 21 years ago
- Current status: Online

WorldStarHipHop is a content-aggregating video blog. Founded in 2005, the site averaged 1.2 million unique visitors a day in 2011. The site, operated by Worldstar, LLC, was founded by Lee "Q" O'Denat. Described by Vibe as a "remnant of the GeoCities generation", the site regularly features shocking events caught on video, music videos and assorted content targeted to young audiences. O'Denat, who referred to himself as a "Haitian ghetto nerd", described WorldStarHipHop as the "CNN of the ghetto".

The website first became infamous for posting shock videos. Many of the early videos of shocking events had gone viral. According to Gothamist's John Del Signore, "The site's popularity has created a sort of voyeuristic feedback loop, in which disassociated bystanders immediately videotape shocking incidents and act as if they're already watching a video on the Internet". Jeff Himmelman of The New York Times stated in 2013 that the website "does many things but mostly hosts videos of fights".

By 2012, BET had voted WorldStarHipHop as the "top hip hop and urban culture website" for three years in a row.

== History ==
=== Initial launch ===
Lee "Q" O'Denat (November 2, 1973 – January 23, 2017) was a Hollis, Queens–based hip-hop fan who graduated from Grover Cleveland High School. He started the website in August 2005 with Ari Armani as a distributor of mixtapes. Shortly after the website's launch, hackers destroyed it. O'Denat later restarted the site as a content aggregator. Thereafter, WorldStar focused on hip hop beefs which were previously popular through "street DVDs" such as Smack, The Come Up and others. O'Denat used the setup of OnSmash.com, a website which had already been distributing similar material. O'Denat said that this led to tension between the two websites. He added "Once we went 100 percent video, showing that original hood stuff, we prevailed."

By 2012 companies and artists were using the platform as an advertising tool, including P. Diddy with a promotional video of Cîroc vodka having premiered on WorldStar.

=== Death of O'Denat ===
On January 23, 2017, founder and CEO Lee "Q" O'Denat died of atherosclerotic cardiovascular disease at the age of 43, with morbid obesity as a contributing factor.

== Worldstar as a word ==
In some videos of violent fights, people chant "World Star" in recognition that the video may be posted on the website.

One 2012 video, showing an Elyria, Ohio (Greater Cleveland) woman, Tashay D. Edwards, beating another woman, went viral. Edwards became so well known that it trended on Twitter along with the name "WorldStarHipHop". The video received about one million views in a single day.

== Controversies ==
In 2009, Bill O'Reilly attacked WorldStarHipHop and its president after watching a video of a kid talking about his plans to kill then-president George W. Bush. O'Reilly said, "I believe the Secret Service should arrest the parents of this kid and the purveyor of the website (Q)", calling it a "crime" that this was allowed up after the video was banned on other sites.

WorldStarHipHop has been in cases involving lawsuits for copyright infringement. In one case, Scott v. WorldStarHipHop, a video surfaced of a fight between a man (Scott) and his current and former girlfriend. The video was recorded by a Mr. Seymour and posted to the site. WSHH names the video "Disgraceful: College Fight In NYC Breaks Out Between A Guy, His Girl & Another Girl In Class! (Man Strong Arm's [sic] The Student. Hitting Her With Body Shots)." Shortly after the video was posted Scott was given copyright to the video by Mr. Seymour. He filed for a takedown notice so that WSHH would take down the video. He explained that WS did not have his permission to put up the video of the fight.

Rapper 50 Cent (Curtis Jackson) also sued WorldStarHipHop in 2009 for using his image on their site without his permission. Jackson claimed that WorldStar and O'Denat used his images on the website which led people to believe that he was one of the owners of the site. He explained that O'Denat tarnished his image by having his image up on the site without his permission. After a five-year battle, Jackson finally won the case against WorldStar.

== Criticism ==
David Zurawik of The Baltimore Sun said in 2012 that "Now in its sixth year, WorldStar is seen by many critics as yet another example of the coarsening of U.S. culture and life—another low on a downward continuum that extends from the Jerry Springer-style trash-talk shows of the 1980s and 1990s through to the TMZ.com and RadarOnline websites of today." Some media observers argued that, in the words of Zurawik, "because of its African-American identity, it has the potential to be used by some viewers to create or fuel stereotypes of urban America as an out-of-control, chaotic space dominated by young, violent, African-American men." Nsenga Burton, the editor at large of The Root and an associate professor at Goucher College, described the site as "basically shock video. They comb the pop cultural landscape for videos that are shocking on multiple levels and feed into peoples' voyeuristic tendencies." In 2013, rapper Childish Gambino released a song called "Worldstar" about its popularity as a website and the sensationalism that it encourages, particularly in how many violent acts that are filmed and showcased on the site go viral.
