= Lamin discography =

- Studio albums: 4
- EPs: 2
- Singles: 22
- Guest appearances: 14
- Collaborative albums: 1
- Collaborative EPs: 1

Danish rapper Lamin has released four studio albums, two extended plays, 22 singles, as well as featuring on an additional 14 songs. He has additionally released one studio album and extended play as a collaboration with Artigeardit. As a solo artist, Lamin released his first single, "Tiger", in May 2019. His first extended play was released by Def Jam Recordings, under the Universal Music Denmark label, in October 2020. The EP, entitled Tour, reached number 21 on the Hitlisten charts the week following its release. Nine days after submitting his thesis to complete his bachelor's degree, Lamin released his debut studio album Hva ved de om Lams on 25 June 2021. The album became Lamin's first appearance in the top 10 on the Hitlisten charts. The album would go on to achieve triple-platinum certification by IFPI Danmark, surpassing 60,000 sales. One song, "Ben i hver lejr", went on to achieve platinum status despite not having reached the Hitlisten charts.

Lamin's next extended play was a collaboration with fellow Danish rapper Artigeardit, released in October 2021. The EP was preceded by the single "Hvor fuck er min drink?", which went double-platinum and peaked at number 14. Ny agenda, the EP, was also certified platinum and rose to number-three on the Danish charts. The following year, in September 2022, Kronisk Skeptisk was released as Lamin's second studio album. The album became his first number-one album, and was quintuple-platinum certified. Three separate tracks from the album went on to reach the Hitlisten charts and achieve varying degrees of certification. One year later, on 1 September 2023, a second collaboration with Artigeardit was released. The studio album, Nu hvor vi er her, was the second album from Lamin to achieve number-one. Of the 13 tracks on the album, nine of them went on to appear in the Danish top 40 charts. The duo later released a non-album single, "Sent", in January 2024, which became Lamin's first song to become a number-one hit. This was then followed up by his second appearance at number one when Anton Westerlin and Lamin released "Chanel Freestyle" in May.

De her timer, Lamin's most recent EP, was released in May 2024. As with his previous EP, it peaked at number three on the Hitlisten charts. The title track from the EP also reached number-three on the singles chart, and was certified double-platinum. In September 2024, SkyLL was released as his fourth and most recent studio album. The album continued a trend for his studio albums, once more achieving number-one on the Hitlisten album chart. "H V D O L" became the only song from the album to chart, becoming Lamin's third number-one single in the process. His first number-one feature came in 2025, appearing on Annika's debut album with the song "Stolt", a song that later achieved triple-platinum certification.

To begin 2026, Lamin released the single "Låst inde" on 17 April. On 18 June, he released Wavy as a surprise album, making the announcement only 30 minutes prior to its release. The week following its release, it charted as a number-one album with the song "Hold mit tempo" becoming a number-one single. Every song from the album reached the Hitlisten singles chart.

== Albums ==
=== Solo studio albums ===
Title	Details	Peak chart positions	Certifications
Title	Details	DEN	Certifications
Hva ved de om Lams	Release date: 25 June 2021; Label: Def Jam Recordings, Universal Music Denmark	10	IFPI DEN: 3× Platinum
Kronisk skeptisk	Release date: 2 September 2022; Label: Def Jam Recordings, Universal Music Denmark	1	IFPI DEN: 5× Platinum
SkyLL	Release date: 19 September 2024; Label: Force Majeure Records, Universal Music Denmark	1	IFPI DEN: 2× Platinum
Wavy	Release date: 19 June 2026; Label: Island Records, Universal Music Denmark	1	IFPI DEN: Platinum

=== Collaborative studio albums ===
Title	Details	Peak chart positions	Certifications
Title	Details	DEN	Certifications
Nu hvor vi er her (with Artigeardit)	Released: 1 September 2023; Label: Universal Music Denmark	1	IFPI DEN: 3× Platinum

== Extended plays ==
=== Solo extended plays ===
Title	Details	Peak chart positions	Certifications
Title	Details	DEN	Certifications
Tour	Release date: 9 October 2020; Label: Def Jam Recordings	21	IFPI DEN: Gold
De her timer	Release date: 31 May 2024; Label: Force Majeure Records	3	

=== Collaborative extended plays ===
Title	Details	Peak chart positions	Certifications
Title	Details	DEN	Certifications
Ny agenda (with Artigeardit)	Release date: 15 October 2021; Label: Def Jam Recordings	3	IFPI DEN: Platinum

== Singles ==
=== As lead artist ===
Title	Year	Peak chart positions	Certifications	Album
Title	Year	DEN	Certifications	Album
"Tiger"	2019	—		Non-album singles
"Trabajo"	2019	—		Non-album singles
"Milano Step" (with Artigeardit)	2020	—		Non-album singles
"Daggerin'" (featuring Icekiid)	2020	33	IFPI DEN: Gold	Tour
"Mood Swings" (with Michael Williams)	2021	—		Non-album single
"Ny agenda" (with Artigeardit)	2021	—		Ny agenda
"Vågen"	2022	10		Non-album singles
"Kig forbi" (with Johnson)	2022	—		Non-album singles
"RTW"	2023	3	IFPI DEN: Platinum	Non-album singles
"Baddies & Draris"	2023	7	IFPI DEN: Gold	Non-album singles
"Sam forleden"	2023	7	IFPI DEN: 2× Platinum	Non-album singles
"Vi ku' blive" (with Artigeardit)	2023	5	IFPI DEN: 2× Platinum	Nu hvor vi er her
"Sent" (with Artigeardit)	2024	1	IFPI DEN: Gold	Non-album singles
"Ot"	2024	2	IFPI DEN: Gold	Non-album singles
"Chanel Freestyle" (with Anton Westerlin)	2024	—	IFPI DEN: Platinum	Non-album singles
"De her timer"	2024	3	IFPI DEN: 2× Platinum	De her timer
"H V D O L"	2024	1	IFPI DEN: Platinum	SkyLL
"Kun os"	2025	3	IFPI DEN: Platinum	Non-album singles
"XL-BYG"	2025	6		Non-album singles
"Låst inde"	2026	4	IFPI DEN: Gold	Wavy
"Se på mig" (with Lea Romea)	2026	8		Non-album single

=== As featured artist ===
Title	Year	Peak chart positions	Certifications	Album
Title	Year	DEN	Certifications	Album
"Rewinder" (Jamaika featuring Lamin and NODE)	2020	18	IFPI DEN: Gold	Non-album singles
"Ka ik skjule det" (with Josva)	2022	—		Non-album singles
"Drop Top" (Mike Lowrey featuring Lamin and Stepz)	2022	18		Non-album singles
"All In" (Blæst featuring Lamin)	2023	3	IFPI DEN: Platinum	Dine venner
"Young Habibi" (Benny Jamz featuring Lamin)	2023	38	IFPI DEN: Gold	Non-album singles
"North Face" (Kundo featuring Lamin)	2024	24		Non-album singles
"God dag" (Andreas Odbjerg featuring Lamin and Ida Laurberg)	2024	39	IFPI DEN: Gold	Non-album singles
"Sikke en type" (Zuloo featuring Lamin)	2025	—		Non-album singles
"Flueben" (with Anton Westerlin)	2025	12	IFPI DEN: Gold	Godaften
"Entré" (Anton Westerlin featuring Lamin & ozzy)	2025	1	IFPI DEN: Platinum	Godaften
"Ryggen mod muren" (Gilli featuring Lamin & Hans Philip)	2025	9		Rene hjerte vinder altid
"Bipolar" Benny Jamz, Gilli, Lamin, B.O.C)	2025	2		Non-album single
"10 dage" (Benny Jamz featuring Lamin)	2025	9		Calirose
"Stolt" (Annika and Lamin)	2025	1	IFPI DEN: 3× Platinum	AW

== Other charted or certified songs ==
Title	Year	Peak chart positions	Certifications	Album
Title	Year	DEN	Certifications	Album
"Ben i hver lejr"	2021	—	IFPI DEN: Platinum	Hva ved de om Lams
"Hvor fuck er min drink?" (Lamin and Artigeardit)	2021	14	IFPI DEN: 2× Platinum	Ny agenda
"Mumler for meget" (Lamin and Artigeardit)	2021	33	IFPI DEN: Gold	Ny agenda
"Humør" (Lamin and Artigeardit)	2021	35		Ny agenda
"Gode dage, gode drinks"	2022	4	IFPI DEN: 3× Platinum	Kronisk skeptisk
"Hvad skal der ske" (Lamin and Icekiid)	2022	7	IFPI DEN: 2× Platinum	Kronisk skeptisk
"Balance" (Lamin, Kesi, and Benny Jamz)	2022	11	IFPI DEN: Gold	Kronisk skeptisk
"Betalt" (Tessa, Lamin, and Benny Jamz)	2023	19		Tessas hævn
"Ssshhhhh (Shut Up)" (Artigeardit, Lamin, and Jelassi)	2023	33		Nu hvor vi er her
"XOXO" (Artigeardit, Lamin, and Icekiid)	2023	6	IFPI DEN: Platinum	Nu hvor vi er her
"Sirjegsindssyg" (Artigeardit, Lamin, and Benjamin Hav)	2023	26		Nu hvor vi er her
"Ret god stemning" (Lamin and Artigeardit)	2023	20		Nu hvor vi er her
"Selvfølgelig" (Artigeardit and Lamin)	2023	11	IFPI DEN: Gold	Nu hvor vi er her
"Sorte pletter" (Artigeardit and Lamin)	2023	17		Nu hvor vi er her
"Dag-til-dag Rapper" (Artigeardit and Lamin)	2023	23		Nu hvor vi er her
"Hva Status" (Artigeardit and Lamin)	2023	4	IFPI DEN: Gold	Nu hvor vi er her
"God mand/Dårlig verden" (with Lamin)	2023	32		Nu hvor vi er her
"Carplay" (Artigeardit and Lamin)	2024	40		Nu hvor vi er her
"Hva du på" (Lamin and Gilli)	2024	1	IFPI DEN: 3× Platinum	De her timer
"Travlt bror, du kender"	2024	8		SkyLL
"Enzym"	2024	12	IFPI DEN: Gold	SkyLL
"2er ved søerne"	2024	13		SkyLL
"AtGøreEtBarnTilEnVinder"	2024	16		SkyLL
"Græsset grønnere"	2024	19		SkyLL
"W"	2024	26		SkyLL
"Bid af bølgen"	2024	27		SkyLL
"Først & Fremmest"	2024	39		SkyLL
"Cohiba" (featuring Noah Carter and Gilli)	2026	3	IFPI DEN: Gold	Wavy
"Bitter"	2026	14		Wavy
"Highs & Lows"	2026	15		Wavy
"2 the Stars"	2026	21		Wavy
"Majeo"	2026	16		Wavy
"Sober" (featuring Gilli)	2026	13		Wavy
"Alt til sin tid"	2026	31		Wavy
"Kemikalierne"	2026	23		Wavy
"Ipren"	2026	35		Wavy
"Hold mit tempo" (featuring Annika)	2026	1	IFPI DEN: Platinum	Wavy
"Absolut" (featuring Benny Jamz)	2026	26		Wavy
"LV Sweater"	2026	27		Wavy
