= List of number-one albums from the 2020s (Denmark) =

The Danish Albums Chart is a list of albums ranked by physical and digital sales in Denmark. It is compiled by Nielsen Music Control in association with the Danish branch of the International Federation of the Phonographic Industry (IFPI), and the new number-one album is announced every Thursday at midnight on the official Danish music charts website.

The following are the albums which reached number one in Denmark during the 2020s.

== 2020 ==
Number-one albums of 2020 in Denmark
Week	Date	Artist	Album
51/2019	1 January 2020	Michael Bublé	Christmas
52/2019	8 January 2020	Rasmus Seebach	Tak for turen: De første 10 är
1/2020	15 January 2020	Benny Jamz	1010
2/2020	22 January 2020	Benny Jamz	1010
3/2020	29 January 2020	Eminem	Music to Be Murdered By
4/2020	5 February 2020	Eminem	Music to Be Murdered By
5/2020	12 February 2020	Branco and Gilli	Euro Connection
6/2020	19 February 2020	Branco and Gilli	Euro Connection
7/2020	26 February 2020	Suspekt	Sindssyge ting
8/2020	4 March 2020	Branco and Gilli	Euro Connection
9/2020	11 March 2020	Branco and Gilli	Euro Connection
10/2020	18 March 2020	Branco and Gilli	Euro Connection
11/2020	25 March 2020	Branco and Gilli	Euro Connection
12/2020	1 April 2020	The Weeknd	After Hours
13/2020	8 April 2020	The Weeknd	After Hours
14/2020	15 April 2020	The Weeknd	After Hours
15/2020	22 April 2020	The Weeknd	After Hours
16/2020	29 April 2020	The Weeknd	After Hours
17/2020	6 May 2020	TopGunn	Sas
18/2020	13 May 2020	TopGunn	Sas
19/2020	20 May 2020	TopGunn	Sas
20/2020	27 May 2020	Citybois	Bois Forever
21/2020	3 June 2020	Citybois	Bois Forever
22/2020	10 June 2020	Citybois	Bois Forever
23/2020	17 June 2020	Citybois	Bois Forever
24/2020	24 June 2020	The Weeknd	After Hours
25/2020	1 July 2020	The Weeknd	After Hours
26/2020	8 July 2020	The Weeknd	After Hours
27/2020	15 July 2020	Pop Smoke	Shoot for the Stars, Aim for the Moon
28/2020	22 July 2020	Juice Wrld	Legends Never Die
29/2020	29 July 2020	Pop Smoke	Shoot for the Stars, Aim for the Moon
30/2020	5 August 2020	Taylor Swift	Folklore
31/2020	12 August 2020	Kesi	BO4L
32/2020	19 August 2020	Kesi	BO4L
33/2020	26 August 2020	Kesi	BO4L
34/2020	2 September 2020	Kesi	BO4L
35/2020	9 September 2020	Kesi	BO4L
36/2020	16 September 2020	Pop Smoke	Shoot for the Stars, Aim for the Moon
37/2020	23 September 2020	Pop Smoke	Shoot for the Stars, Aim for the Moon
38/2020	30 September 2020	Ude Af Kontrol	Uforglemmelig Anderledes Kunst
39/2020	7 October 2020	Pop Smoke	Shoot for the Stars, Aim for the Moon
40/2020	14 October 2020	Pop Smoke	Shoot for the Stars, Aim for the Moon
41/2020	21 October 2020	Michael Falch	Forår I Brystet
42/2020	28 October 2020	Pop Smoke	Shoot for the Stars, Aim for the Moon
43/2020	4 November 2020	Bruce Springsteen	Letter to You
44/2020	11 November 2020	Pop Smoke	Shoot for the Stars, Aim for the Moon
45/2020	18 November 2020	Folkeklubben	Børn af den tabte tid
46/2020	25 November 2020	Stepz	Stepzologi II
47/2020	2 December 2020	BTS	Be
48/2020	9 December 2020	Michael Bublé	Christmas
49/2020	16 December 2020	Michael Bublé	Christmas
50/2020	23 December 2020	Michael Bublé	Christmas
51/2020	30 December 2020	Michael Bublé	Christmas
52/2020	6 January 2021	Pop Smoke	Shoot for the Stars, Aim for the Moon

== 2021 ==
Number-one albums of 2021 in Denmark
Week	Date	Artist	Album
1/2021	13 January 2021	Branco	Baba Business 2
2/2021	20 January 2021	Branco	Baba Business 2
3/2021	27 January 2021	Branco	Baba Business 2
4/2021	3 February 2021	Branco	Baba Business 2
5/2021	10 February 2021	Branco	Baba Business 2
6/2021	17 February 2021	Branco	Baba Business 2
7/2021	24 February 2021	Branco	Baba Business 2
8/2021	3 March 2021	Branco	Baba Business 2
9/2021	10 March 2021	Various artists	MGP 2021
10/2021	17 March 2021	Various artists	MGP 2021
11/2021	24 March 2021	Various artists	MGP 2021
12/2021	31 March 2021	Justin Bieber	Justice
13/2021	7 April 2021	Justin Bieber	Justice
14/2021	14 April 2021	Justin Bieber	Justice
15/2021	21 April 2021	Justin Bieber	Justice
16/2021	28 April 2021	Justin Bieber	Justice
17/2021	5 May 2021	Justin Bieber	Justice
18/2021	12 May 2021	Justin Bieber	Justice
19/2021	19 May 2021	Justin Bieber	Justice
20/2021	26 May 2021	J. Cole	The Off-Season
21/2021	2 June 2021	Olivia Rodrigo	Sour
22/2021	9 June 2021	Artigeardit	Held & lykke med at komme hjem
23/2021	16 June 2021	Olivia Rodrigo	Sour
24/2021	23 June 2021	Olivia Rodrigo	Sour
25/2021	30 June 2021	Benny Jamz, Gilli and Kesi as B.O.C	Mere End Musik
26/2021	7 July 2021	Benny Jamz, Gilli and Kesi as B.O.C	Mere End Musik
27/2021	14 July 2021	Benny Jamz, Gilli and Kesi as B.O.C	Mere End Musik
28/2021	21 July 2021	Benny Jamz, Gilli and Kesi as B.O.C	Mere End Musik
29/2021	28 July 2021	Benny Jamz, Gilli and Kesi as B.O.C	Mere End Musik
30/2021	4 August 2021	Benny Jamz, Gilli and Kesi as B.O.C	Mere End Musik
31/2021	11 August 2021	Billie Eilish	Happier Than Ever
32/2021	18 August 2021	Billie Eilish	Happier Than Ever
33/2021	25 August 2021	Fyr og Flamme	Fyr og Flamme
34/2021	1 September 2021	Balstyrko	Jagten på noget
35/2021	8 September 2021	Kanye West	Donda
36/2021	15 September 2021	Drake	Certified Lover Boy
37/2021	22 September 2021	Drake	Certified Lover Boy
38/2021	29 September 2021	Lil Nas X	Montero
39/2021	6 October 2021	Branco	10 Years
40/2021	13 October 2021	Branco	10 Years
41/2021	20 October 2021	Branco	10 Years
42/2021	27 October 2021	Jung	Forfra forbundet
43/2021	3 November 2021	Benny Jamz, Gilli and KESI as B.O.C	Mere End Musik
44/2021	10 November 2021	Ed Sheeran	=
45/2021	17 November 2021	ABBA	Voyage
46/2021	24 November 2021	ABBA	Voyage
47/2021	1 December 2021	Adele	30
48/2021	8 December 2021	Michael Bublé	Christmas
49/2021	15 December 2021	Volbeat	Servant of the Mind
50/2021	22 December 2021	Michael Bublé	Christmas
51/2021	29 December 2021	Michael Bublé	Christmas
52/2021	5 January 2022	Michael Bublé	Christmas

== 2022 ==
Number-one albums of 2022 in Denmark
Week	Date	Artist	Album
1/2022	12 January 2022	Ed Sheeran	=
2/2022	19 January 2022	The Minds of 99	Infinity Action
3/2022	26 January 2022	Gilli	Carnival
4/2022	2 February 2022	Gilli	Carnival
5/2022	9 February 2022	Gilli	Carnival
6/2022	16 February 2022	Gilli	Carnival
7/2022	23 February 2022	Gilli	Carnival
8/2022	2 March 2022	Gilli	Carnival
9/2022	9 March 2022	Various artists	MGP 2022
10/2022	16 March 2022	Gilli	Carnival
11/2022	23 March 2022	Gilli	Carnival
12/2022	30 March 2022	Gilli	Carnival
13/2022	6 April 2022	Gilli	Carnival
14/2022	13 April 2022	Tina Dickow	Bitte små ryk
15/2022	20 April 2022	Andreas Odbjerg	Hjem fra fabrikken
16/2022	27 April 2022	Andreas Odbjerg	Hjem fra fabrikken
17/2022	4 May 2022	Andreas Odbjerg	Hjem fra fabrikken
18/2022	11 May 2022	Rammstein	Zeit
19/2022	18 May 2022	Jack Harlow	Come Home the Kids Miss You
20/2022	25 May 2022	Kendrick Lamar	Mr. Morale & the Big Steppers
21/2022	1 June 2022	Harry Styles	Harry's House
22/2022	8 June 2022	Harry Styles	Harry's House
23/2022	15 June 2022	Harry Styles	Harry's House
24/2022	22 June 2022	Harry Styles	Harry's House
25/2022	29 June 2022	Kesi	30 somre
26/2022	6 July 2022	Kesi	30 somre
27/2022	13 July 2022	Harry Styles	Harry's House
28/2022	20 July 2022	Kesi	30 somre
29/2022	27 July 2022	Benny Jamz	Jamo
30/2022	3 August 2022	Benny Jamz	Jamo
31/2022	10 August 2022	Beyoncé	Renaissance
32/2022	17 August 2022	Ed Sheeran	=
33/2022	24 August 2022	Kesi	30 somre
34/2022	31 August 2022	Gilli	Carnival
35/2022	7 September 2022	Gilli	Carnival
36/2022	14 September 2022	Lamin	Kronisk skeptisk
37/2022	21 September 2022	Lamin	Kronisk skeptisk
38/2022	28 September 2022	Lamin	Kronisk skeptisk
39/2022	5 October 2022	Lamin	Kronisk skeptisk
40/2022	12 October 2022	Hans Philip	(α)
41/2022	19 October 2022	Lamin	Kronisk skeptisk
42/2022	26 October 2022	Gilli	Suave World
43/2022	2 November 2022	Taylor Swift	Midnights
44/2022	9 November 2022	Gilli	Suave World
45/2022	16 November 2022	Drake and 21 Savage	Her Loss
46/2022	23 November 2022	Tobias Rahim	Når sjælen kaster op
47/2022	30 November 2022	Tobias Rahim	Når sjælen kaster op
48/2022	7 December 2022	Tobias Rahim	Når sjælen kaster op
49/2022	14 December 2022	Metro Boomin	Heroes & Villains
50/2022	21 December 2022	Michael Bublé	Christmas
51/2022	28 December 2022	Michael Bublé	Christmas
52/2022	4 January 2023	Michael Bublé	Christmas

== 2023 ==
Number-one albums of 2023 in Denmark
Week	Date	Artist	Album	Ref.
1/2023	11 January 2023	Tobias Rahim	Når sjælen kaster op	
2/2023	18 January 2023	Tobias Rahim	Når sjælen kaster op	
3/2023	25 January 2023	Tobias Rahim	Når sjælen kaster op	
4/2023	1 February 2023	Lukas Graham	4 (The Pink Album)	
5/2023	8 February 2023	Artigeardit	Længe leve	
6/2023	15 February 2023	Artigeardit	Længe leve	
7/2023	22 February 2023	Gobs	Knuste hjerter heler aldrig	
8/2023	1 March 2023	Gobs	Knuste hjerter heler aldrig	
9/2023	8 March 2023	Gobs	Knuste hjerter heler aldrig	
10/2023	15 March 2023	Gobs	Knuste hjerter heler aldrig	
11/2023	22 March 2023	Stepz	Dit liv dit valg	
12/2023	29 March 2023	D1MA	Ev1gt&alt1d	
13/2023	5 April 2023	Depeche Mode	Memento Mori	
14/2023	12 April 2023	Tobias Rahim	Når sjælen kaster op	
15/2023	19 April 2023	Tobias Rahim	Når sjælen kaster op	
16/2023	26 April 2023	Metallica	72 Seasons	
17/2023	3 May 2023	Tobias Rahim	Når sjælen kaster op	
18/2023	10 May 2023	Tobias Rahim	Når sjælen kaster op	
19/2023	17 May 2023	Benny Jamz	Ny sejr	
20/2023	24 May 2023	Ukendt Kunstner	Dankstop	
21/2023	31 May 2023	Ukendt Kunstner	Dankstop	
22/2023	7 June 2023	Ukendt Kunstner	Dankstop	
23/2023	14 June 2023	Ukendt Kunstner	Dankstop	
24/2023	21 June 2023	Christopher	A Beautiful Life (Music from the Netflix Film)	
25/2023	28 June 2023	Christopher	A Beautiful Life (Music from the Netflix Film)	
26/2023	5 July 2023	Tobias Rahim	Når sjælen kaster op	
27/2023	12 July 2023	Tobias Rahim	Når sjælen kaster op	
28/2023	19 July 2023	Tobias Rahim	Når sjælen kaster op	
29/2023	26 July 2023	Tobias Rahim	Når sjælen kaster op	
30/2023	2 August 2023	Tobias Rahim	Når sjælen kaster op	
31/2023	9 August 2023	Travis Scott	Utopia	
32/2023	16 August 2023	Travis Scott	Utopia	
33/2023	23 August 2023	Travis Scott	Utopia	
34/2023	30 August 2023	Tobias Rahim	Når sjælen kaster op	
35/2023	6 September 2023	Tobias Rahim	Når sjælen kaster op	
36/2023	13 September 2023	Lamin and Artigeardit	Nu hvor vi er her	
37/2023	20 September 2023	Lamin and Artigeardit	Nu hvor vi er her	
38/2023	27 September 2023	Lamin and Artigeardit	Nu hvor vi er her	
39/2023	4 October 2023	Lamin and Artigeardit	Nu hvor vi er her	
40/2023	11 October 2023	Lamin and Artigeardit	Nu hvor vi er her	
41/2023	18 October 2023	Drake	For All the Dogs	
42/2023	25 October 2023	TopGunn	DK Goat	
43/2023	1 November 2023	The Rolling Stones	Hackney Diamonds	
44/2023	8 November 2023	Taylor Swift	1989 (Taylor's Version)	
45/2023	15 November 2023	Gilli	Kiko Club	
46/2023	22 November 2023	Jamaika	Championship	
47/2023	29 November 2023	Gilli	Kiko Club	
48/2023	6 December 2023	Gilli	Kiko Club	
49/2023	13 December 2023	Michael Bublé	Christmas	
50/2023	20 December 2023	Michael Bublé	Christmas	
51/2023	27 December 2023	Michael Bublé	Christmas	
52/2023	3 January 2024	Michael Bublé	Christmas	

== 2024 ==
Number-one albums of 2024 in Denmark
Week	Date	Artist	Album	Ref.
1/2024	10 January 2024	Gilli	Kiko Club	
2/2024	17 January 2024	Gilli	Kiko Club	
3/2024	24 January 2024	Gilli	Kiko Club	
4/2024	31 January 2024	Gilli	Kiko Club	
5/2024	7 February 2024	Gilli	Kiko Club	
6/2024	14 February 2024	Gobs	Mellem himmel & jord	
7/2024	21 February 2024	Kanye West and Ty Dolla Sign	Vultures 1	
8/2024	28 February 2024	Gobs	Mellem himmel & jord	
9/2024	6 March 2024	Various artists	MGP 2024	
10/2024	13 March 2024	Various artists	MGP 2024	
11/2024	20 March 2024	Ariana Grande	Eternal Sunshine	
12/2024	27 March 2024	Various artists	MGP 2024	
13/2024	3 April 2024	Noah Carter	Noahs Ark	
14/2024	10 April 2024	Beyoncé	Cowboy Carter	
15/2024	17 April 2024	Noah Carter	Noahs Ark	
16/2024	24 April 2024	Beyoncé	Cowboy Carter	
17/2024	1 May 2024	Taylor Swift	The Tortured Poets Department	
18/2024	8 May 2024	Taylor Swift	The Tortured Poets Department	
19/2024	15 May 2024	Taylor Swift	The Tortured Poets Department	
20/2024	22 May 2024	Taylor Swift	The Tortured Poets Department	
21/2024	29 May 2024	Billie Eilish	Hit Me Hard and Soft	
22/2024	5 June 2024	Branco	Baba Business 3	
23/2024	12 June 2024	Billie Eilish	Hit Me Hard and Soft	
24/2024	19 June 2024	Billie Eilish	Hit Me Hard and Soft	
25/2024	26 June 2024	Billie Eilish	Hit Me Hard and Soft	
26/2024	3 July 2024	Benny Jamz and Gilli	Kenny	
27/2024	10 July 2024	Benny Jamz and Gilli	Kenny	
28/2024	17 July 2024	Benny Jamz and Gilli	Kenny	
29/2024	24 July 2024	Benny Jamz and Gilli	Kenny	
30/2024	31 July 2024	Benny Jamz and Gilli	Kenny	
31/2024	7 August 2024	Benny Jamz and Gilli	Kenny	
32/2024	14 August 2024	Benny Jamz and Gilli	Kenny	
33/2024	21 August 2024	Kesi	FOMO 88.8 FM	
34/2024	28 August 2024	Kesi	FOMO 88.8 FM	
35/2024	4 September 2024	Kesi	FOMO 88.8 FM	
36/2024	11 September 2024	Kesi	FOMO 88.8 FM	
37/2024	18 September 2024	Kesi	FOMO 88.8 FM	
38/2024	25 September 2024	Kesi	FOMO 88.8 FM	
39/2024	2 October 2024	Lamin	SkyLL	
40/2024	9 October 2024	Lamin	SkyLL	
41/2024	16 October 2024	Lamin	SkyLL	
42/2024	23 October 2024	Lamin	SkyLL	
43/2024	30 October 2024	Lamin	SkyLL	
44/2024	6 November 2024	Thomas Helmig	Sortedam	
45/2024	13 November 2024	The Cure	Songs of a Lost World	
46/2024	20 November 2024	Lamin	SkyLL	
47/2024	27 November 2024	Lamin	SkyLL	
48/2024	4 December 2024	Kendrick Lamar	GNX	
49/2024	11 December 2024	Michael Bublé	Christmas	
50/2024	18 December 2024	Michael Bublé	Christmas	
51/2024	25 December 2024	Michael Bublé	Christmas	
52/2024	1 January 2025	Michael Bublé	Christmas	
53/2024	8 January 2025	SZA	SOS	

== 2025 ==
Number-one albums of 2025 in Denmark
Week	Date	Artist	Album	Ref.
1/2025	15 January 2025	SZA	SOS	
2/2025	22 January 2025	SZA	SOS	
3/2025	29 January 2025	Mas	Månen er min ven	
4/2025	5 February 2025	Mas	Månen er min ven	
5/2025	12 February 2025	The Weeknd	Hurry Up Tomorrow	
6/2025	19 February 2025	Kendrick Lamar	GNX	
7/2025	26 February 2025	Sabrina Carpenter	Short n' Sweet	
8/2025	5 March 2025	Various artists	MGP 2025	
9/2025	12 March 2025	Various artists	MGP 2025	
10/2025	19 March 2025	Various artists	MGP 2025	
11/2025	26 March 2025	Playboi Carti	Music	
12/2025	2 April 2025	Various artists	MGP 2025	
13/2025	9 April 2025	Sabrina Carpenter	Short n' Sweet	
14/2025	16 April 2025	Sabrina Carpenter	Short n' Sweet	
15/2025	23 April 2025	D-A-D	Live from the Arena	
16/2025	30 April 2025	Billie Eilish	Hit Me Hard and Soft	
17/2025	7 May 2025	Artigeardit	Æteren	
18/2025	14 May 2025	Gilli	Rene hjerter vinder altid	
19/2025	21 May 2025	Annika	AW	
20/2025	28 May 2025	Annika	AW	
21/2025	4 June 2025	Anton Westerlin	Godaften	
22/2025	11 June 2025	Annika	AW	
23/2025	18 June 2025	Annika	AW	
24/2025	25 June 2025	Annika	AW	
25/2025	2 July 2025	Annika	AW	
26/2025	9 July 2025	Annika	AW	
27/2025	16 July 2025	Annika	AW	
28/2025	23 July 2025	Justin Bieber	Swag	
29/2025	30 July 2025	Justin Bieber	Swag	
30/2025	6 August 2025	Annika	AW	
31/2025	13 August 2025	Annika	AW	
32/2025	20 August 2025	Annika	AW	
33/2025	27 August 2025	Annika	AW	
34/2025	3 September 2025	Various artists	KPop Demon Hunters (Soundtrack from the Netflix Film)	
35/2025	10 September 2025	Sabrina Carpenter	Man's Best Friend	
36/2025	10 September 2025	Justin Bieber	Swag II	
37/2025	24 September 2025	Various artists	KPop Demon Hunters (Soundtrack from the Netflix Film)	
38/2025	1 October 2025	Tobias Rahim	Vulkanø	
39/2025	8 October 2025	Benny Jamz	Calirose	
40/2025	15 October 2025	Taylor Swift	The Life of a Showgirl	
41/2025	22 October 2025	Taylor Swift	The Life of a Showgirl	
42/2025	29 October 2025	Taylor Swift	The Life of a Showgirl	
43/2025	5 November 2025	Taylor Swift	The Life of a Showgirl	
44/2025	12 November 2025	Taylor Swift	The Life of a Showgirl	
45/2025	19 November 2025	Anton Westerlin	Godaften	
46/2025	26 November 2025	Taylor Swift	The Life of a Showgirl	
47/2025	3 December 2025	Rasmus Seebach	Verden ka' vente	
48/2025	10 December 2025	Michael Bublé	Christmas	
49/2025	17 December 2025	Michael Bublé	Christmas	
50/2025	24 December 2025	Michael Bublé	Christmas	
51/2025	31 December 2025	Michael Bublé	Christmas	
52/2025	7 January 2026	Annika	AW	

== 2026 ==
Number-one albums of 2026 in Denmark
Week	Date	Artist	Album	Ref.
1/2026	14 January 2026	Annika	AW	
2/2026	21 January 2026	Annika	AW	
3/2026	28 January 2026	Annika	AW	
4/2026	4 February 2026	Mille	(Over)lever	
5/2026	11 February 2026	Mille	(Over)lever	
6/2026	18 February 2026	Bad Bunny	Debí Tirar Más Fotos	
7/2026	25 February 2026	Bad Bunny	Debí Tirar Más Fotos	
8/2026	4 March 2026	Various artists	MGP 2026	
9/2026	11 March 2026	Aphaca	Vild ungdom	
10/2026	18 March 2026	Harry Styles	Kiss All the Time. Disco, Occasionally.	
11/2026	25 March 2026	Aphaca	Vild ungdom	
12/2026	1 April 2026	Aphaca	Vild ungdom	
13/2026	8 April 2026	Aphaca	Vild ungdom	
14/2026	15 April 2026	Annika	AW	
15/2026	22 April 2026	Aphaca	Vild ungdom	
16/2026	29 April 2026	Aphaca	Vild ungdom	
17/2026	6 May 2026	Aphaca	Vild ungdom	
18/2026	13 May 2026	Anton Westerlin	Bag gardinerne S1+S2	
19/2026	20 May 2026	Kesi	Men så kom i morgen	
20/2026	27 May 2026	Kesi	Men så kom i morgen	
21/2026	3 June 2026	Kesi	Men så kom i morgen	
22/2026	10 June 2026	Paul McCartney	The Boys of Dungeon Lane	
23/2026	17 June 2026	Artigeardit	Den lange vej	
24/2026	24 June 2026	Olivia Rodrigo	You Seem Pretty Sad for a Girl So in Love	
25/2026	1 July 2026	Lamin	Wavy	
26/2026	8 July 2026	Lamin	Wavy	
27/2026	15 July 2026	Lamin	Wavy	
28/2026	22 July 2026	Lamin	Wavy	
29/2026	29 July 2026	Lamin	Wavy	
30/2026	5 August 2026	Lamin	Wavy	
31/2026	12 August 2026	Ariana Grande	Petal	
32/2026	19 August 2026	Lamin	Wavy	
33/2026	26 August 2026	Lukas Graham	Good Times	
34/2026	2 September 2026	Lamin	Wavy	
35/2026	9 September 2026	Lamin	Wavy	
36/2026	16 September 2026	Gnags	Knark	
37/2026	23 September 2026	Aphaca	Vild ungdom	
38/2026	30 September 2026	Gilli	Verden er din	
39/2026	7 October 2026	Gilli	Verden er din	
40/2026	14 October 2026	Gilli	Verden er din	
41/2026	21 October 2026	Noah Carter	Noahs Ark II	
42/2026	28 October 2026	Noah Carter	Noahs Ark II	
43/2026	4 November 2026	Tina Dickow	Balancing Small Things on Sharp Edges	
44/2026	11 November 2026	The Minds of 99	Dét der udenfor & B-sider	
45/2026	11 November 2026	Gilli	Verden er din	
