= List of artists who reached number one on the Danish singles chart =

This is a complete list of recording artists who have reached number one in the singles chart in Denmark, published by Tracklisten since 2 November 2007

- All acts are listed alphabetically.
- Solo artists are alphabetized by last name, Groups by group name excluding "A", "An", and "The".
- Each act's total of number-one singles is shown after their name.
- All artists who are mentioned in song credits are listed here; this includes one-time pairings of otherwise solo artists and those appearing as featured. Members of a group who reached number one are excluded, unless they hit number one as a solo artist.

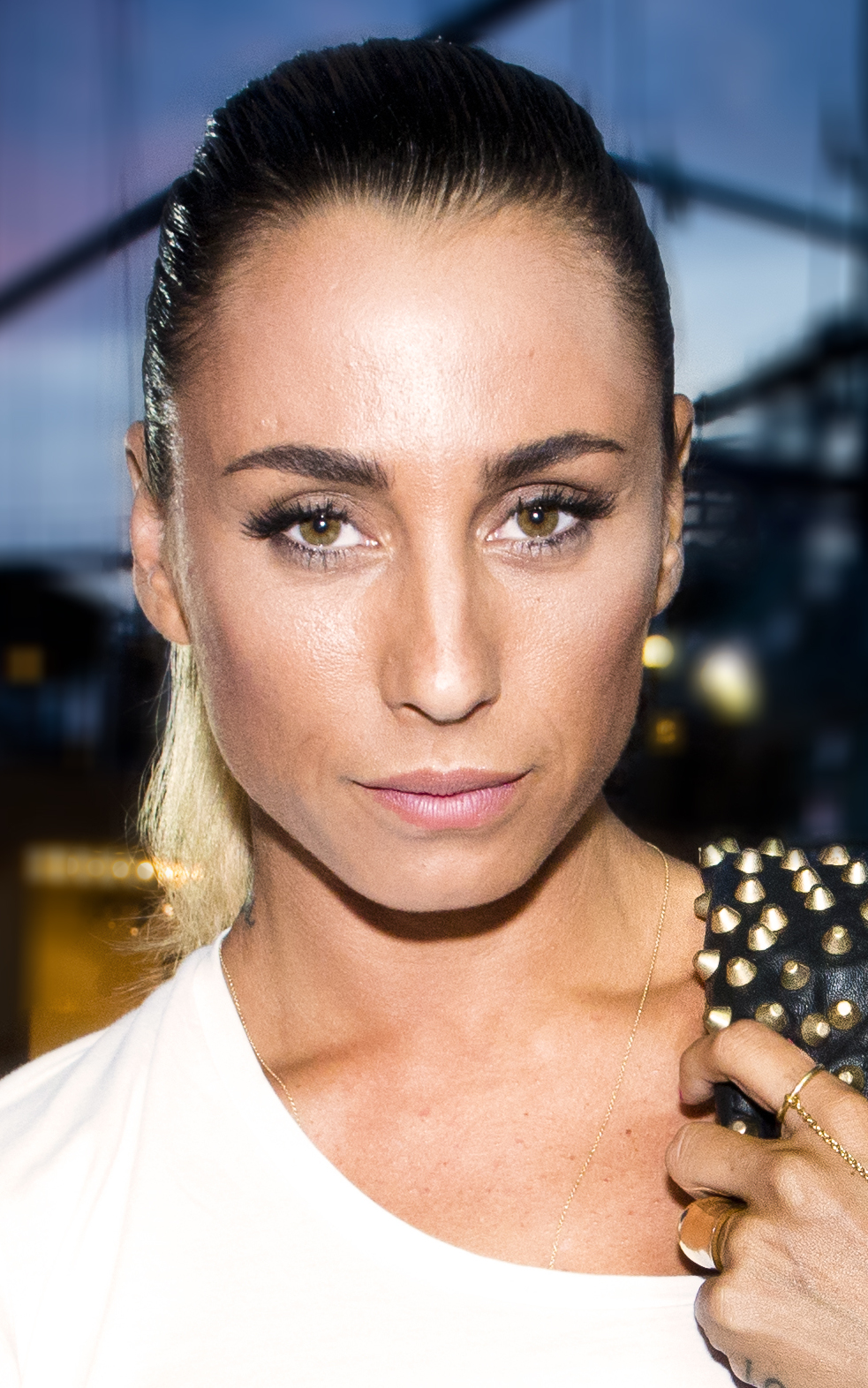
Gilli holds the record for most number-ones with 19. while Medina (pictured) holds the record for the most number-one songs by a female artist with 13 songs.

== 0-9 ==
- 070 Shake (1)
- 21 Savage (1)
- 24kGoldn (1)

== A ==
- Adele (2)
- Christina Aguilera (1)
- Alex (1)
- Alien Beat Club (1)
- Alphabeat (1)
- Linda Andrews (1)
- Anne-Marie (1)
- Annika (8)
- Anthony Jasmin (1)
- Aphaca (2)
- Aqua (1)
- Artigeardit (3)
- AronChupa (1)
- A'Typisk (1)
- Avicii (1)

== B ==
- Brandon Beal (3)
- Beyoncé (2)
- Bekuh BOOM (1)
- Lauren Bennett (1)
- Justin Bieber (16)
- Sys Bjerre (1)
- Ras (1)
- Bjørnskov (1)
- The Black Eyed Peas (1)
- Blak (1)
- Branco (8)
- BloodPop (1)
- Brinck (1)
- Frida Brygmann (1)
- Bro (1)

== C ==
- Daniel Caesar (1)
- Camila Cabello (1)
- Mariah Carey (1)
- Noah Carter (1)
- Chance The Rapper (2)
- The Chainsmokers (1)
- Cheryl Cole (1)
- Christopher (5)
- Clara (2)
- Clean Bandit (1)
- Clemens (1)
- Bradley Cooper (1)
- Ida Corr (1)
- Miley Cyrus (1)

== D ==
- D1MA (2)
- DaBaby (1)
- Daft Punk (2)
- Danser med piger (1)
- DCUP (1)
- Denmark national football team (1)
- Alina Devecerski (1)
- Tina Dickow (1)
- Aura Dione (1)
- Iann Dior (1)
- DJ Snake (1)
- DR P3 (1)
- Drake (4)
- Donkeyboy (1)

== E ==
- Malte Ebert (2)
- Emmelie de Forest (2)
- Eminem (1)
- Mikky Ekko (1)

== F ==
- Fallulah (1)
- Thor Farlov (1)
- Luis Fonsi (1)
- Fouli (1)
- Fyr & Flamme (1)
- Freshlyground (1)

== G ==
- Burhan G (7)
- Lady Gaga (4)
- Gilli (19)
- Giveon (1)
- Ellie Goulding (1)
- Gobs (4)
- Goonrock (1)
- Gotye (1)
- David Guetta (1)
- Guldimund (1)
- Gulddreng (8)
- Guru Josh Project (1)

== H ==
- Støt Haiti (1)
- Halsey (1)
- Calvin Harris (1)
- Benjamin Hav (2)
- Hedegaard (1)
- Hennedub (1)
- Thomas Helmig (1)
- Herreslandsholdet (1)
- Martin (2)

== I ==
- Icekiid (2)
- Ida (1)
- Ida Corr (1)

== J ==
- Michael Jackson (1)
- Jada (1)
- Benny Jamz (1)
- Jay-Z (1)
- Carly Rae Jepsen (1)
- Jimilian (1)
- Johnson (1)
- Jokeren (1)
- Sarah (1)
- Camille Jones (1)
- Jooks (1)

== K ==
- Kato (2)
- Kesha (1)
- KESI (11)
- Marie Key (1)
- Birthe Kjær (1)
- DJ Khaled (1)
- Kimbra (1)
- Wiz Khalifa (1)
- Kundo (1)
- Ukendt Kunstner (1)

== L ==
- Larry 44 (1)
- Lamin (8)
- Dean Lewis (1)
- Ryan Lewis (1)
- Nik (1)
- Lilly Wood & The Prick (1)
- Lil Nas X (1)
- Livid (1)
- Lizzie (1)
- LMFAO (1)
- L.O.C. (5)
- Lolo (2)
- Shaka Loveless (1)
- Lukas Graham (11)
- Rosa Lux (1)

== M ==
- Macklemore (1)
- Paul McCartney (1)
- Mads Langer (3)
- Madonna (1)
- Major Lazer (1)
- Malm (1)
- Bruno Mars (2)
- Maroon 5 (1)
- Marstein (1)
- Ava Max (1)
- Tate McRae (2)
- Medina (13)
- MellemFingaMuzik (2)
- Shawn Mendes (2)
- Lena Meyer-Landrut (1)
- Millie (1)
- Milow (1)
- MØ (1)
- Joey Moe (2)
- Barbara Moleko (1)
- Mumle (1)
- Muri & Mario (1)

== N ==
- Nephew (5)
- Nik & Jay (5)
- Node (2)
- Sak Noel (1)
- Jon Nørgaard (1)

== O ==
- Andreas Odbjerg (2)
- Olivver (1)
- Omar (1)
- OMI (1)
- One Direction (4)
- One Two (1)
- Owl City (1)
- Ozzy (1)

== P ==
- Panamah (1)
- Passenger (1)
- Sean Paul (1)
- Thomas Ring Peterson (1)
- Katy Perry (2)
- Pharfar (1)
- Hans Philip (2)
- Pitbull (1)
- Post Malone (1)
- PSY (1)
- Charlie Puth (1)

== Q ==
- Quavo (1)

== R ==
- Tobias Rahim (7)
- Raye (1)
- Bebe Rexha (1)
- Rihanna (7)
- Roddy Ricch (1)
- Olivia Rodrigo (2)
- The Rumour Said Fire (1)
- Rune Reilly Kölsc (1)
- Alexander Rybak (1)

== S ==
- Safri Duo (1)
- Soluna Samay (1)
- Saveus (2)
- Augusta Schackinger (1)
- Robin Schulz (1)
- Rasmus Seebach (7)
- Selvmord (1)
- Shakira (1)
- Ed Sheeran (5)
- Lord Silva (2)
- Sivas (1)
- Sleiman (1)
- Clara Sofie (1)
- Britney Spears (3)
- Alexandra Stan (1)
- Suspekt (2)
- Specktors (1)
- Don Stefano (1)
- Stromae (1)
- Harry Styles (1)
- Svenstrup (1)
- Taylor Swift (1)

== T ==
- Tacabro (1)
- Loreen (1)
- Tessa (1)
- Justin Timberlake (3)
- Tones and I (1)
- TopGunn (3)
- Meghan Trainor (1)

== U ==
- Ukendt Kunstner (2)
- Uro (1)

== V ==
- Vendelboe (1)
- Vera (1)

== W ==
- Wanz (1)
- Alex Warren (1)
- The Weeknd (4)
- Anton Westerlin (5)
- Wham! (1)
- Kanye West (1)
- Will.i.Am (1)
- Pharrell Williams (2)
- Alberte (1)

== X ==
- Xander (1)
- X Factor (1)

== Y ==
- Daddy Yankee (1)
- Yolanda Be Cool (1)

== External ==
- The official Danish music charts - archive of Tracklisten goes back to week 1, 2007
