= Æteren =

2025 studio album by Artigeardit

Studio album by Artigeardit
- Released: 25 April 2025
- Genre: Hip-hop
- Length: 33:14
- Label: Universal Music Denmark
- Producers: Marius Iversen; Nicki Pooyandeh; Anton Westerlin; Rob Smyles; JenneJenne; Vera

Artigeardit chronology
På gen5yn (2024)	Æteren (2025)	Pusto (2026)

Singles from Æteren
- 1. "Seaside" Released: 10 April 2025

Æteren (transl. The ether) is the fifth solo studio album by Albanian-Danish rapper Artigeardit. The album, released on 25 April 2025, was published by Universal Music Denmark. The album became Artigeardit's fourth consecutive number one album, including the collaborative album with Lamin, Nu hvor vi er her. Since its release, the album has achieved gold certification from IFPI Danmark.

== Release and reception ==
Artigeardit first announced the album via Instagram on 23 April 2025, where he shared the album's track list. The album, Æteren, was two days later. Preceding the album's release, on 10 April, Artigeardit released the single "Seaside".

Upon its release, the album received generally positive reviews. Soundvenue, which gave the album four of six stars, praised the album overall and Artigeardit's collaboration with Marius Iversen, the primary producer of the album. However, the reviewer noted that the guest features sometimes overshadowed Artigeardit. Politiken reviewer Pernille Jensen gave a favourable review with four of six stars, but stated the album suffered from the "inconsistent quality of its tracks". Ralf Christensen, of Dagbladet Information, reviewed the album positively, complimenting Artigeardit's exploration and mixing hip-hop and pop. Gaffa was more critical with just two of six stars, criticizing what the reviewer saw as "unfinished-sounding demos" and creative directions that were not fully developed.

The album debuted at number one on the Hitlisten charts on 7 May 2025, making it Artigeardit's fourth consecutive album to achieve the honour. The album spent 19 weeks on the Hitlisten charts. As the only single from the album, "Seaside" went on to achieve platinum certification, peaking at number two on the singles chart following the album's release. The only other song from the album to reach the top 40 was "Honningkrukken". The album has been certified gold by IFPI Danmark.

== Track listing ==
No.	Title	Lyrics	Producer(s)	Length
1.	"De her svin"	Artigeardit	Marius Iversen; Nicki Pooyandeh	2:07
2.	"Honningkrukken"	Artigeardit	Iversen	3:01
3.	"Baddie" (featuring Tobias Rahim and Josva)	Artigeardit; Rahim	Iversen	3:24
4.	"Seaside"	Artigeardit; Josva	Iversen	3:07
5.	"Uanset" (featuring Gusto)	Artigeardit	Iversen	2:29
6.	"Ondt i numsen"	Artigeardit	Iversen	1:53
7.	"LVFL" (featuring Noah Carter)	Artigeardit; Carter	Iversen; Anton Westerlin	2:05
8.	"Til stede" (featuring Mas and Lamin)	Artigeardit; Mas; Lamin	Iversen; Rob Smyles; JenneJenne	3:52
9.	"Stå for det" (featuring Lord Siva)	Artigeardit; Lord Siva	Iversen	2:30
10.	"Altid anderledes"	Artigeardit	Iversen; Westerlin	2:54
11.	"FaceTime"	Artigeardit	Iversen	3:13
12.	"Æteren" (featuring Vera and MØ)	Artigeardit; MØ; Mads Koch; Søren Breum	Iversen; Vera	2:39
Total length:				33:14

== Charts ==
=== Weekly charts ===
Weekly chart performance
Chart (2025–2026)	Peak position
Danish Albums (Hitlisten)	1

=== Year-end charts ===
Year-end chart performance
Chart	Year	Position
Danish Albums (Hitlisten)	2025	22

== Certifications ==
Certifications
Region	Certification	Certified units/sales
Denmark (IFPI Danmark)	Gold	10,000^{‡}
^{*} Sales figures based on certification alone.^{‡} Sales+streaming figures based on certification alone.
