= List of number-one hits of 2025 (Denmark) =

Hitlisten is a chart that ranks the best-performing singles and tracks in Denmark. Its data, published by IFPI Danmark and compiled by M&I Service, are based collectively on each song's weekly digital sales and streaming figures.

== Chart history ==
List of number-one hits
Week	Issue date	Song	Artist(s)	Ref.
1	15 January 2025	"Du ligner din mor"	Benjamin Hav featuring Lukas Graham	
2	22 January 2025	"Du ligner din mor"	Benjamin Hav featuring Lukas Graham	
3	29 January 2025	"Du ligner din mor"	Benjamin Hav featuring Lukas Graham	
4	5 February 2025	"Blodigt"	Anton Westerlin featuring Annika	
5	12 February 2025	"Blodigt"	Anton Westerlin featuring Annika	
6	19 February 2025	"Blodigt"	Anton Westerlin featuring Annika	
7	26 February 2025	"Blodigt"	Anton Westerlin featuring Annika	
8	5 March 2025	"Blodigt"	Anton Westerlin featuring Annika	
9	12 March 2025	"Hele vejen"	Omar featuring Mumle	
10	19 March 2025	"Entré"	Anton Westerlin, Lamin and Ozzy	
11	26 March 2025	"Hele vejen"	Omar featuring Mumle	
12	2 April 2025	"Ordinary"	Alex Warren	
13	9 April 2025	"Igen & igen"	Gobs featuring One Two	
14	16 April 2025	"Hele vejen"	Omar featuring Mumle	
15	23 April 2025	"Hele vejen"	Omar featuring Mumle	
16	30 April 2025	"Hele vejen"	Omar featuring Mumle	
17	7 May 2025	"Hele vejen"	Omar featuring Mumle	
18	14 May 2025	"Hele vejen"	Omar featuring Mumle	
19	21 May 2025	"Stolt"	Annika featuring Lamin	
20	28 May 2025	"Stolt"	Annika featuring Lamin	
21	4 June 2025	"Stolt"	Annika featuring Lamin	
22	11 June 2025	"Stolt"	Annika featuring Lamin	
23	18 June 2025	"Stolt"	Annika featuring Lamin	
24	25 June 2025	"Stolt"	Annika featuring Lamin	
25	2 July 2025	"Stolt"	Annika featuring Lamin	
26	9 July 2025	"Stolt"	Annika featuring Lamin	
27	16 July 2025	"En drøm om et menneske"	Aphaca	
28	23 July 2025	"En drøm om et menneske"	Aphaca	
29	30 July 2025	"En drøm om et menneske"	Aphaca	
30	6 August 2025	"En drøm om et menneske"	Aphaca	
31	13 August 2025	"En drøm om et menneske"	Aphaca	
32	20 August 2025	"En drøm om et menneske"	Aphaca	
33	27 August 2025	"Ødelagt byen"	Olivver featuring Augusta Schackinger	
34	3 September 2025	"Ødelagt byen"	Olivver featuring Augusta Schackinger	
35	10 September 2025	"Ødelagt byen"	Olivver featuring Augusta Schackinger	
36	17 September 2025	"Ødelagt byen"	Olivver featuring Augusta Schackinger	
37	24 September 2025	"En drøm om et menneske"	Aphaca	
38	1 October 2025	"Sandheden"	Rasmus Seebach and Artigeardit	
39	8 October 2025	"Sandheden"	Rasmus Seebach and Artigeardit	
40	15 October 2025	"The Fate of Ophelia"	Taylor Swift	
41	22 October 2025	"The Fate of Ophelia"	Taylor Swift	
42	29 October 2025	"Vil du noget?"	Guldimund and Saveus	
43	5 November 2025	"Vil du noget?"	Guldimund and Saveus	
44	12 November 2025	"Vil du noget?"	Guldimund and Saveus	
45	19 November 2025	"Vil du noget?"	Guldimund and Saveus	
46	26 November 2025	"Vil du noget?"	Guldimund and Saveus	
47	3 December 2025	"Tinka"	Burhan G and Frida Brygmann	
48	10 December 2025	"Last Christmas"	Wham!	
49	17 December 2025	"Last Christmas"	Wham!	
50	24 December 2025	"Last Christmas"	Wham!	
51	31 December 2025	"Last Christmas"	Wham!	
52	7 January 2026	"En drøm om et menneske"	Aphaca	
