= Kronisk skeptisk =

2022 studio album by Lamin

Studio album by Lamin
- Released: 2 September 2022
- Genre: Hip-hop
- Length: 42:01
- Label: Def Jam Recordings; Universal Music Denmark
- Producer: Anton Westerlin; JenneJenne; Rob Smyles; Frederik Buchard; Chanelbigs; Nicki Pooyandeh; Adam Hillebrandt

Lamin chronology
Ny agenda (2021)	Kronisk skeptisk (2022)	Nu hvor vi er her (2023)

Kronisk skeptisk is the second solo studio album by Danish rapper and songwriter Lamin. It was published by Def Jam Recordings under the Universal Music Denmark label on 2 September 2022.

== Release and reception ==
Lamin's sophomore album, Kronisk skeptisk (lit. 'Chronic Skeptic'), was released on 2 September 2022 and became his first number one album when it appeared on the Hitlisten charts on 14 September. The album contained the songs "Gode dage, gode drinks" and "Hvad skal der ske", both of which went on to receive double-platinum certifications and appear inside of the top 10 on the Danish charts. The album received generally positive reviews from critics, who noted the catchy songs while others believed it failed to produce anything exciting. The album since has gone on to become Lamin's only quintuple-platinum album, and finished 2022 as the sixth most-streamed album of the year in Denmark on Spotify.

In late September 2022, Lamin received the first major award nomination as he was named as a finalist for DR's P3 Guld awards. He was nominated for the P3 Talent award and, like the other nominees for the award, performed during the event itself. He was named as the winner of the award and the accompanying DKK 100,000 prize.

== Track listing ==
No.	Title	Lyrics	Producer(s)	Length
1.	"Kronisk skeptisk"	Lamin	Anton Westerlin	1:45
2.	"Bag Gardinerne"	Lamin	Westerlin	2:41
3.	"03:15" (with Kesi)	Lamin; Kesi	JenneJenne; Rob Smyles	2:31
4.	"Balance" (with Kesi, Benny Jamz)	Lamin; Kesi; Benny Jamz	JenneJenne; Smyles	2:35
5.	"BGode Dage, Gode Drinks"	Lamin	Westerlin	2:20
6.	"Issa Interlude"	Lamin; ISSA	Westerlin	1:09
7.	"Ten Toes" (with JEFF3)	Lamin; JEFF3	Frederik Buchard	3:28
8.	"Forfra"	Lamin	Westerlin	3:08
9.	"Window"	Lamin	Westerlin	2:29
10.	"Hvad Skal Der Ske" (with Icekiid)	Lamin; Icekiid	Westerlin	2:58
11.	"The Wave"	Lamin	Westerlin; Chanelbigs	2:52
12.	"Dreez Interlude"	Artigeardit	Westerlin	0:46
13.	"Motto"	Lamin	Westerlin	3:07
14.	"Grint & Grædt" (with Giift)	Lamin; Giift	Nicki Pooyandeh	3:37
15.	"Æstetisk"	Lamin	Adam Hillebrandt	2:31
16.	"Tungen Lige I Munden"	Lamin	Westerlin	4:04
Total length:				42:01

== Charts ==
=== Weekly charts ===
Weekly chart performance
Chart (2022–2026)	Peak position
Danish Albums (Hitlisten)	1

=== Year-end charts ===
Year-end chart performance
Chart	Year	Position
Danish Albums (Hitlisten)	2022	9
Danish Albums (Hitlisten)	2023	4
Danish Albums (Hitlisten)	2024	12
Danish Albums (Hitlisten)	2025	24

== Certifications ==
Certifications
Region	Certification	Certified units/sales
Denmark (IFPI Danmark)	5× Platinum	100,000^{‡}
^{*} Sales figures based on certification alone.^{‡} Sales+streaming figures based on certification alone.
