= Held & lykke med at komme hjem =

2021 studio album by Artigeardit

Studio album by Artigeardit
- Released: 28 May 2021
- Genre: Hip hop
- Length: 40:27
- Label: Def Jam Recordings; Universal Music Denmark
- Producer: Artigeardit; Anton Westerlin; Alfred Thomas; Adam Hillebrandt; Rasmus Theodor; Barselona; Awinbeh; Rob & Jenne; Fraads

Artigeardit chronology
Elev4tormusik (2020)	Held & lykke med at komme hjem (2021)	Ny agenda (2021)

Singles from Held & lykke med at komme hjem
- 1. "Stå op gå ned" Released: 19 January 2021; 2. "Er her" Released: 14 May 2021

Held & lykke med at komme hjem (transl. Good luck getting home) is the third solo studio album from Albanian-Danish rapper Artigeardit. Released on 28 May 2021, the album was published by Def Jam Recordings under the Universal Music Denmark label. The album became Artigeardit's first number one album. The album has been certified triple-platinum by IFPI Danmark.

== Release and reception ==
Held & lykke med at komme hjem was released on 28 May 2021 as Artigeardit's third studio album. Prior to the album's release, several singles were released, including "Stå op gå ned", "Som du vil", and "Er her", the latter of which was a collaboration with fellow Danish rapper Kesi. Danish music magazine Soundvenue described the album as a transitional period of Artigeardit's musical career, with themes ranging from introspective and self-critical similar to his earlier albums, notably Idiot, while incorporating a more melodic and genre-crossing production.

With the album's release, Soundvenue highlighted the stylistic experimentation, pointing to the politically-charged "DNGIDK", a rock-influenced track "Stå op gå ned" featuring Barselona, and the Drake-inspired flows on "Berunder". Reviewer Kristian Karl noted this as expanding beyond his work on his two previous studio albums. Soundvenue gave the album four of six star review, noting that the album was "imperfect but honest". The album also received four of six stars from Gaffa. The album has continued to be described as a "rite of passage" between Artigeardit's reckless youth and more reflective themes that would become a larger part of his later albums.

Gaffa later cited the album as one of the top 20 most-streamed albums in Denmark during 2022. The album contributed to Artigeardit's reputation as one of the country's leading rappers, with Soundvenue describing Artigeardit as one of Denmark's "hottest rappers". As of May 2025, the album has achieved triple-platinum by IFPI Danmark. One single from the album, "Er her", has been certified platinum five times.

== Accolades ==
Year	Award	Category	Recipient(s)	Result	Ref.
2021	Danish Music Awards	Danish Album of the Year	Held & lykke med at komme hjem	Won	
2021	Danish Music Awards	Danish Streaming Hit of the Year	"Er her" (with Kesi)	Nominated	
2021	P3 Guld	Listener Hit	"Er her" (with Kesi)	Nominated	
2022	GAFFA Awards	Danish Hip-hop Release of the Year	Held & lykke med at komme hjem	Nominated	
2022	ZULU Awards	Hit of the Year	"Er her" (with Kesi)	Nominated	

== Track listing ==
No.	Title	Lyrics	Producer(s)	Length
1.	"Gamle vaner"	Artigeardit	Anton Westerlin	1:40
2.	"Advokat"	Artigeardit; Oscar Johansen	Alfred Thomas	2:45
3.	"Stå pp gå ned" (with Barselona)	Artigeardit; Rud Aslak	Adam Hillebrandt; Rasmus Theodor; Barselona	3:10
4.	"DNGIDK"	Artigeardit	Westerlin; Hillebrandt; Awinbeh	3:05
5.	"Bruser" (featuring Lamin)	Artigeardit; Lamin	Hillebrandt	3:05
6.	"Er her" (with Kesi)	Artigeardit; Kesi	Westerlin	2:37
7.	"Beundrer"	Artigeardit	Westerlin; Artigeardit	2:50
8.	"E20"	Artigeardit	Rob & Jenne	3:01
9.	"Leve med hinanden" (with Fraads)	Artigeardit	Fraads	2:57
10.	"Luft i dæk"	Artigeardit	Hillebrandt	3:35
11.	"Som du vil"	Artigeardit	Westerlin	3:02
12.	"Overblikket"	Artigeardit	Westerlin	3:01
13.	"Skar mig ned" (featuring Josva)	Artigeardit; Josva	Westerlin; Hillebrandt	2:55
14.	"Uden dig"	Westerlin	Westerlin	2:44
Total length:				40:27

== Charts ==
=== Weekly charts ===
Weekly chart performance
Chart (2021–2026)	Peak position
Danish Albums (Hitlisten)	1

=== Year-end charts ===
Year-end chart performance
Chart	Year	Position
Danish Albums (Hitlisten)	2021	19
Danish Albums (Hitlisten)	2022	19
Danish Albums (Hitlisten)	2023	48
Danish Albums (Hitlisten)	2024	80
Danish Albums (Hitlisten)	2025	88

== Certifications ==
Certifications
Region	Certification	Certified units/sales
Denmark (IFPI Danmark)	3× Platinum	60,000^{‡}
^{*} Sales figures based on certification alone.^{‡} Sales+streaming figures based on certification alone.
