= Den lange vej =

2026 studio album by Artigeardit

Studio album by Artigeardit
- Released: 5 June 2026
- Genre: Hip-hop
- Length: 40:31
- Label: Universal Music Denmark
- Producers: Marius Iversen; William Asingh; Tobias Svensson; Anton Westerlin; Freyy; Asmus Harm

Artigeardit chronology
Pusto (2025)	Den lange vej (2026)

Singles from Den lange vej
- 1. "Louisiana" Released: 24 April 2026; 2. "Ivrig" Released: 29 May 2026

Den lange vej (transl. The long road) is the sixth solo studio album by Albanian-Danish rapper Artigeardit. The album, released on 5 June 2026, was published by Universal Music Denmark. The album achieved number one on the Hitlisten charts.

== Release and reception ==
Announced on Artigeardit's personal Instagram on 3 June 2026, the album was announced for a release two days later on 5 June. Two singles preceded the album's release, as Artigeardit released "Louisiana" in April, and "Ivrig" just days before the announcement of the album. As with his previous studio album, Den lange vej was largely produced by Marius Iversen.

The album released on 5 June to positive-to-mixed reviews. Soundvenue writer Kjartan Stolberg reviewed the album positively, giving it five of six stars, stating it was one of the artist's "masterpieces" alongside Længe leve. Ekstra Bladet reviewer Thomas Treo also gave the album four of six stars. Other outlets were more critical of the album, with Gaffa giving the album three of six stars, stating the album tried to do too much. Politiken reviewer Simon Lund gave the album five of six stars, calling Artigeardit Danish hip-hop's answer to David Bowie.

The album achieved number one upon its debut on the Hitlisten charts, making it Artigeardit's fifth consecutive studio album to achieve the number one spot. In the album's debut week, it sent three songs into the Danish top 40.

== Track listing ==
No.	Title	Lyrics	Producer(s)	Length
1.	"Den lange vej"	Artigeardit	Marius Iversen	2:26
2.	"Ivrig"	Artigeardit	Iversen	2:48
3.	"En ulykke kommer sjældent alene" (with Soleima)	Artigeardit	Iversen	3:36
4.	"Louisiana"	Artigeardit	Iversen	2:52
5.	"Hvis væggene kunne tale"	Artigeardit	Iversen	2:58
6.	"Foden på pedalen"	Artigeardit	Iversen	3:02
7.	"Begejstring"	Artigeardit	Iversen	2:52
8.	"Vær dig selv"	Artigeardit	Iversen	3:33
9.	"Feeling" (with Josva)	Artigeardit; Josva	Iversen; William Asingh; Tobias Svensson	3:14
10.	"Ændre"	Artigeardit	Iversen; Anton Westerlin	2:46
11.	"Øjne" (with Vera)	Artigeardit	Iversen; Asingh	4:08
12.	"Hold dig vågen" (Freyy)	Artigeardit; Freyy	Iversen; Freyy	2:56
13.	"Bløde for dig"	Artigeardit	Asmus Harm	3:20
Total length:				40:31

== Charts ==
Chart performance for Den lange vej
Chart (2026)	Peak position
Danish Albums (Hitlisten)	1

== Certifications ==
Certifications
Region	Certification	Certified units/sales
Denmark (IFPI Danmark)	Gold	10,000^{‡}
^{*} Sales figures based on certification alone.^{‡} Sales+streaming figures based on certification alone.
