= Hva ved de om Lams =

2021 studio album by Lamin

Studio album by Lamin
- Released: 25 June 2021
- Genre: Hip-hop
- Length: 37:40
- Label: Def Jam Recordings; Universal Music Denmark
- Producer: Anton Westerlin; Rob; Adam Hillebrandt; T.O.; Kayvahn; Frederik Buchard; Lukas Visti; Benjamin Lasnier; Pilfinger; LukasBL

Lamin chronology
Hva ved de om Lams (2021)	Ny agenda (2021)

Hva ved de om Lams (lit. 'What do they know about Lams') is the debut studio album by Danish rapper and songwriter Lamin. It was released by Def Jam Recordings, under the Universal Music Denmark label, on 25 June 2021.

== Release and reception ==
After being forced to quit football due to injuries, Lamin turned his attention to music though he still intended to pursue a career as a teacher. Lamin's debut EP received praise as he was named as one of the top 15 Danish rappers to "watch out for in the future" by Soundvenue.

On 25 June 2021, Hva ved de om Lams was released as Lamin's debut album. Primarily produced by Anton Westerlin and released under the Def Jam Recordings label, the album was released nine days after Lamin turned in his thesis to complete his bachelor's degree. Upon its release, the album was highlighted on Soundvenue's six albums of the week.

The album debuted at number ten on the Hitlisten charts. As of April 2026, the album has spent 117 weeks on the top 40 charts in Denmark, and has achieved triple-platinum certification from IFPI Danmark.

== Track listing ==
No.	Title	Lyrics	Producer(s)	Length
1.	"? (Intro)"	Lamin	Anton Westerlin	1:24
2.	"Ben i hver lejr"	Lamin	Westerlin	3:16
3.	"Holde kulden"	Lamin	Rob	2:35
4.	"Opladt" (featuring Karl William)	Lamin; Karl William	Westerlin; Adam Hillebrandt	2:57
5.	"Falsk energi"	Lamin	T.O.	3:05
6.	"Touchdown" (featuring 5star)	Lamin; 5star	Kayvahn	2:29
7.	"Gerninger"	Lamin	Westerlin	2:38
8.	"Plejer"	Lamin	Westerlin	2:27
9.	"Finde på" (featuring Artigeardit & Sivas)	Lamin; Artigeardit; Sivas	Westerlin	2:33
10.	"Lifestyle"	Lamin	Frederik Buchard; Lukas Visti	2:49
11.	"Charlie Sheen" (featuring Benny Jamz)	Lamin; Benny Jamz	T.O.	2:52
12.	"100%"	Lamin	Westerlin	3:07
13.	"+45"	Lamin	Benjamin Lasnier; Pilfinger; LukasBL	2:22
14.	"Nok poblemer, ringer senere"	Lamin	Westerlin	3:06
Total length:				37:40

== Charts ==
=== Weekly charts ===
Weekly chart performance
Chart (2021–2026)	Peak position
Danish Albums (Hitlisten)	10

=== Year-end charts ===
Year-end chart performance
Chart	Year	Position
Danish Albums (Hitlisten)	2022	81
Danish Albums (Hitlisten)	2023	35
Danish Albums (Hitlisten)	2024	38
Danish Albums (Hitlisten)	2025	33

== Certifications ==
Certifications
Region	Certification	Certified units/sales
Denmark (IFPI Danmark)	3× Platinum	60,000^{‡}
^{*} Sales figures based on certification alone.^{‡} Sales+streaming figures based on certification alone.
