= Wavy (album) =

2026 studio album by Lamin

Studio album by Lamin
- Released: 19 June 2026
- Genre: Hip-hop
- Length: 37:31
- Labels: Island; Universal Music Denmark
- Producers: Anton Westerlin; Rob Smyles; JenneJenne; Nicki Pooyandeh; Jacobsenbeats; Carl Altino; Adam Hillebrandt

Lamin chronology
SkyLL (2024)	Wavy (2026)

Wavy (stylised in all caps) is the fourth solo studio album by Danish rapper Lamin. The album was released on 19 June 2026 by Island Records, under the Universal Music Denmark label. The album became a number-one album in Denmark following its release.

== Release and reception ==
On 18 June 2026, Lamin posted on Instagram that he would hold a concert later that night at Pumphuset in Copenhagen for just 500 people. That night, he released a surprise album with only 30 minutes notice on his Instagram. His fourth solo studio album, Wavy, released at midnight. Two months prior, Lamin had released the single "Låst inde", which was included on the album. The single had peaked at number four on the Hitlisten charts.

Upon the album's release, it received mixed reviews. Gaffa reviewer Elias Kvist gave the album three of six stars. While praising Lamin himself, Kvist wrote that the album was overly cautious and instead leaned into what was already popular on Danish radio. Soundvenue magazine reviewer Daniel Bagge reviewed the album more positively, with four of six stars. His review found similar notes as Kvist's; however, he reviewed them as a positive.

Followings its release, Wavy became Lamin's third consecutive solo number-one album on the Hitlisten charts. On the singles chart, all 13 songs were inside Denmark's top 40, including "Hold mit tempo" which became a number-one hit.

== Track listing ==
No.	Title	Lyrics	Producer(s)	Length
1.	"Cohiba" (featuring Noah Carter and Gilli)	Lamin	Anton Westerlin	2:17
2.	"Bitter"	Lamin	Rob Smyles; JenneJenne	2:44
3.	"Highs & Lows"	Lamin	Westerlin; Nicki Pooyandeh	2:07
4.	"2 the Stars"	Lamin	Pooyandeh	2:35
5.	"Majeo"	Lamin	Westerlin	2:37
6.	"Sober" (featuring Gilli)	Lamin	Westerlin; Pooyandeh; Jacobsenbeats	2:34
7.	"Alt til sin tid"	Lamin	Pooyandeh; Carl Altino	2:31
8.	"Kemikalierne"	Lamin	Pooyandeh; Altino	2:47
9.	"Ipren"	Lamin	Westerlin	2:30
10.	"Hold mit tempo" (featuring Annika)	Lamin	Westerlin	2:43
11.	"Låst inde"	Lamin	Westerlin; Pooyandeh	2:58
12.	"Absolut" (featuring Benny Jamz)	Lamin	Westerlin; Adam Hillebrandt	2:19
13.	"LV Sweater"	Lamin	Westerlin; Pooyandeh; Hillebrandt	6:49
Total length:				37:31

== Charts ==
Chart performance
Chart (2026)	Peak position
Danish Albums (Hitlisten)	1

== Certifications ==
Certifications
Region	Certification	Certified units/sales
Denmark (IFPI Danmark)	Platinum	20,000^{‡}
^{‡} Sales+streaming figures based on certification alone.
