= AW (album) =

2025 studio album by Annika

Studio album by Annika
- Released: 8 May 2025
- Genre: Pop
- Length: 37:41
- Labels: Island Records; Universal Music Denmark
- Producers: Anton Westerlin; Frederik Thaae; Marius Iversen; JenneJenne; Rob Smyles; Victor Støve; Emil Falk; Nicki Pooyandeh; Asmus Harm

AW is the debut album by the Danish singer Annika. The album was released on 8 May 2025 by Island Records.

== Release and reception ==
Released on 8 May 2025, AW features guest appearances from Josva, Sira Jovina, Lamin, and Gilli. The album is primarily produced by Anton Westerlin, Marius Iversen, and Nicki Pooyandeh.

AW spent 16 weeks at number one on the Hitlisten album chart. It was the most popular album on the chart in 2025. This marks the first time since 1999—when the girl group Creamy had the most popular album of the year—that a woman had taken the top spot. The album received 4 out of 6 stars from Soundvenue, which described it as a "confident and self-aware album." Gaffa called it "a musical show of power" in their review. It is a follow-up to her successful EP Nye Tider, released in 2024.

== Track listing ==
No.	Title	Lyrics	Producer(s)	Length
1.	"Der så meget jeg ikke fortæller"	Annika Wedderkopp	Anton Westerlin; Frederik Thaae	3:04
2.	"Bliv her lidt endnu" (featuring Josva)	Annika; Josva; Michael Jamshidi	Marius Iversen	2:42
3.	"Lad mig lande"	Annika	JenneJenne; Rob Smyles	3:41
4.	"Du ik værd at græde for" (featuring Sira Jovina)	Annika; Sira Jovina	Victor Støve	2:39
5.	"Brugt mine dage"	Annika	Iversen	2:57
6.	"Start på ny"	Annika	Westerlin; Emil Falk	2:48
7.	"Det jo bare et kram (interlude)"	Annika	Westerlin	1:20
8.	"Stolt" (featuring Lamin)	Annika; Lamin	Westerlin	3:32
9.	"Jeg er din"	Annika	Westerlin	3:16
10.	"Bar bund" (featuring Gilli)	Annika; Gilli	Nicki Pooyandeh	2:45
11.	"Drukner i os"	Annika	Pooyandeh	2:27
12.	"Hva det var"	Annika	Asmus Harm	2:46
13.	"Vis mig"	Annika	Westerlin	3:39
Total length:				37:41

== Charts ==
=== Weekly charts ===
Weekly chart performance
Chart (2025–2026)	Peak position
Danish Albums (Hitlisten)	1
Norwegian Albums (VG-lista)	84

=== Year-end charts ===
Year-end chart performance
Chart	Year	Position
Danish Albums (Hitlisten)	2025	1

== Certifications ==
Certifications for AW
Region	Certification	Certified units/sales
Denmark (IFPI Danmark)	6× Platinum	120,000^{‡}
^{‡} Sales+streaming figures based on certification alone.
