= Ny agenda =

2021 extended play by Artigeardit and Lamin

EP by Artigeardit and Lamin
- Genre: Hip-hop
- Length: 17:06
- Labels: Def Jam Recordings; Universal Music Denmark
- Producers: Anton Westerlin; Adam Hillebrandt; Frederik Buchard

Artigeardit chronology
Held & lykke med at komme hjem (2021)	Ny agenda (2021)	Længe leve (2023)

Lamin chronology
Hva ved de om Lams (2021)	Ny agenda (2021)	Kronisk Skeptisk (2022)

Ny agenda (lit. 'New agenda') is a collaborative extended play by Danish rappers Artigeardit and Lamin. Primarily produced by Anton Westerlin and Adam Hillebrandt, the album was released on 15 October 2021 by Def Jam Recordings, under the Universal Music Denmark label.

== Release and reception ==
Artigeardit and Lamin announced their collaborative extended play on 13 October 2021, just two days before its release. The album, produced by Anton Westerlin, was preceded the release of a single from the album, "Hvor fuck er min drink." A behind-the-scenes documentary was also released on YouTube, showcasing how the record was made and produced while the duo was in Greece. The documentary showed the duo working with Westerlin and co-producer Adam Hillebrandt, with several songs being developed spontaneously during their sessions. Ny agenda was released on 15 October 2021 through Def Jam Recordings, under the Universal Music Denmark label.

The EP's release marked the second record for both artists, as Artigeardit had released his own studio album months prior in May, and followed a trend of collaborative projects produced by other Danish duos. The album was seen as "fun", but lacked the "disciplined and streamlined" process that Artigeardit's studio albums typically followed according to one review. The EP received generally positive reviews, with Soundvenue writer Kristian Karl describing the release as energetic and playful, highlighting the chemistry between Artigeardit and Lamin. However, Karl noted that the EP lacked the "disciplined and streamlined" process that Artigeardit's studio albums typically followed.

== Accolades ==
Year	Award	Category	Recipient(s)	Result	Ref.
2022	Danish Music Awards	Danish Songwriter of the Year	Artigeardit and Lamin (for Ny Agenda)	Nominated	

== Track listing ==
No.	Title	Lyrics	Producer(s)	Length
1.	"Ny agenda"	Artigeardit; Lamin	Anton Westerlin; Adam Hillebrandt	3:24
2.	"Hvor fuck er min drink?"	Artigeardit; Lamin	Westerlin; Hillebrandt	2:19
3.	"Mumler for meget"	Artigeardit; Lamin	Westerlin; Hillebrandt	2:11
4.	"Gåsehud"	Artigeardit; Lamin	Westerlin; Hillebrandt; Frederik Buchard	3:33
5.	"Humør"	Artigeardit; Lamin	Westerlin; Hillebrandt	2:42
6.	"Spøg til side"	Artigeardit; Lamin	Westerlin; Hillebrandt	2:57
Total length:				17:06

== Charts ==
=== Weekly charts ===
Weekly chart performance
Chart (2021–2026)	Peak position
Danish Albums (Hitlisten)	3

=== Year-end charts ===
Year-end chart performance
Chart	Year	Position
Danish Albums (Hitlisten)	2022	40

== Certifications ==
Certifications
Region	Certification	Certified units/sales
Denmark (IFPI Danmark)	2× Platinum	40,000^{‡}
^{*} Sales figures based on certification alone.^{‡} Sales+streaming figures based on certification alone.
