= SkyLL =

2024 studio album by Lamin

Studio album by Lamin
- Released: 19 September 2024
- Genre: Hip-hop
- Length: 36:14
- Labels: Force Majeure Records; Universal Music Denmark
- Producers: Anton Westerlin; Adam Hillebrandt; Oliver Zoéga; Arto Eriksen; Jens Ole Wowk McCoy

Lamin chronology
Nu hvor vi er her (2023)	SkyLL (2024)	Wavy (2026)

SkyLL is the third solo studio album by Danish rapper and songwriter Lamin. It was released by Force Majeure Records, under the Universal Music Denmark label, on 19 September 2024.

== Release and reception ==
After releasing hints on his Instagram in early September, Lamin released his fourth studio album on 19 September 2024, SkyLL. The album was a return to previous hip-hop sounds; it was noted for several tracks which discussed his early life, from his father leaving him without a male role model to praising his mother for being a single parent. Just as his previous studio album, SkyLL sent a total of eight songs to the Hitlisten charts, with "H V D O L" receiving platinum certification. The album also reached number nine on Spotify's top 10 global albums for the weekend of September 20–22, 2024. The album accumulated more than 1.6 million streams in the first 24 hours following its release.

After the album's release, Lamin was the a recipient of numerous award nominations from the Danish Music Awards and DR's P3 Guld. SkyLL was his first nomination and award win for Danish Album of the Year, while he took the top award of P3 Prize at P3 Guld. He also received and won the Danish Hip-hop Release of the Year at the 2025 GAFFA Awards, making it the second award for SkyLL. In December 2025, he was named as the second most-streamed artist in Denmark on Spotify.

== Accolades ==
Year	Award	Category	Recipient(s)	Result	Ref.
2024	Danish Music Awards	Danish Album of the Year	SkyLL	Won	
2025	GAFFA Awards	Danish Hip-hop Release of the Year	SkyLL	Won	

== Track listing ==
No.	Title	Lyrics	Producer(s)	Length
1.	"Travlt Bror, Du Kender"	Lamin	Anton Westerlin; Adam Hillebrandt	3:10
2.	"H V D O L"	Lamin	Westerlin	3:39
3.	"2er Ved Søerne"	Lamin	Westerlin; Hillebrandt	2:22
4.	"Gråsset Grønnere"	Lamin	Westerlin; Hillebrandt	2:56
5.	"Enzym"	Lamin	Westerlin; Oliver Zoéga	2:37
6.	"SkyLL" (with Benny Jamz)	Lamin; Benjamin Heyn-Johnsen	Westerlin	2:56
7.	"PhD" (featuring Tobias Rahim)	Lamin; Rahim	Westerlin; Hillebrandt; Arto Eriksen	3:00
8.	"W"	Lamin	Hillebrandt	2:10
9.	"Tro På Det" (with Ukendt Kunstner)	Lamin; Hans Philip	Hillebrandt; Jens Ole Wowk McCoy	2:58
10.	"Bid Af Bølgen"	Lamin	Westerlin; Hillebrandt	3:14
11.	"Først & Fremmest"	Lamin	Hillebrandt	2:51
12.	"AtGøreEtBarnTilEnVinder"	Lamin	Westerlin; Hillebrandt	4:16
Total length:				36:14

== Charts ==
=== Weekly charts ===
Weekly chart performance
Chart (2024–2026)	Peak position
Danish Albums (Hitlisten)	1

=== Year-end charts ===
Year-end chart performance
Chart	Year	Position
Danish Albums (Hitlisten)	2024	9
Danish Albums (Hitlisten)	2025	10

== Certifications ==
Certifications
Region	Certification	Certified units/sales
Denmark (IFPI Danmark)	2× Platinum	40,000^{‡}
^{*} Sales figures based on certification alone.^{‡} Sales+streaming figures based on certification alone.
