= Længe leve =

2023 studio album by Artigeardit

Studio album by Artigeardit
- Released: 27 January 2023
- Genre: Hip hop
- Length: 33:52
- Label: Def Jam Recordings; Universal Music Denmark
- Producer: Frederik Thaae; Adam Hillebrandt; Anton Westerlin

Artigeardit chronology
Ny agenda (2021)	Længe leve (2023)	Nu hvor vi er her (2023)

Længe leve (lit. 'Long live') is the fourth solo studio album from Albanian-Danish rapper Artigeardit. Released on 27 January 2023, the album was published by Def Jam Recordings under the Universal Music Denmark label. The album became Artigeardit's second number one album, following Held & lykke med at komme hjem in 2021. The album has been certified double-platinum by IFPI Danmark.

== Release and reception ==
Længe leve was released on 27 January 2023 through Def Jam Recordings, under the Universal Music Denmark label. Artigeardit announced the album two days prior to its release on a post on his Instagram. The album was highly anticipated following the success of his previous album, Held & lykke med at komme hjem. Unlike his previous album, Længe leve contains no features from other artists.

The album received mixed reviews from Danish music critics upon its release. Reviewing the album for Soundvenue, Kristian Karl awarded it six out of six stars, stating: "Længe leve is the album Artigeardit will be remembered for." Karl highlighted the Artigeardit's continued reflective and personal songwriting, particularly on the song "Sidste gang". Unlike Soundvenue, Gaffa reviewer Elias Kvist gave the album only two of six stars, comparing Artigeardit's album to Stormzy "turning his back on hip-hop."

Soundvenue noted the album's expansive production style, with the producers citing musical inspirations beyond contemporary hip hop. The album debuted on the Hitlisten charts at number one, making it Artigeardit's second consecutive studio album to achieve the top spot. In Denmark, seven of the top 10 songs on Spotify the following week were from Længe leve, holding all positions between two to eight. The title track from the album peaked at number two on the Hitlisten charts, with all 10 songs making an appearance on the charts. In the magazine's list of the "50 Most Groundbreaking Danish Albums of the Century", Soundvenue placed the album at number eight.

== Accolades ==
The album and Artigeardit received several nominations at the Danish Music Awards 2023, including Danish Album of the Year and Danish Songwriter of the Year, while Artigeardit won Danish Live Name of the Year. Længe leve later won the award for Danish Album of the Year from the Danish Music Awards in November 2023. At the 2023 P3 Guld awards, Artigeardit won the main award, P3 Prisen, following the album's release. The album was additionally nominated for Danish Release of the Year and Danish Hip-hop Release of the Year, though it did not win either, at the 2024 GAFFA Awards.

Year	Award	Category	Recipient(s)	Result	Ref.
2023	Danish Music Awards	Danish Album of the Year	Længe leve	Won	
2023	Danish Music Awards	Danish Group of the Year	Artigeardit & Lamin	Nominated	
2023	Danish Music Awards	Danish Songwriter of the Year	Længe leve	Nominated	
2023	Danish Music Awards	Danish Live Name of the Year	Artigeardit	Won	
2023	Danish Music Awards	Danish Producer of the Year	Frederik Thaae, Adam Hillebrandt, and Anton Westerlin (for Længe leve)	Won	
2023	EchoPrisen	Musician of the Year	Artigeardit	Won	
2023	P3 Guld	The Prize	Artigeardit	Won	
2024	GAFFA Awards	Danish Release of the Year	Længe leve	Nominated	
2024	GAFFA Awards	Danish Hip-hop Release of the Year	Længe leve	Nominated	

== Track listing ==
No.	Title	Lyrics	Producer(s)	Length
1.	"Længe leve"	Artigeardit	Frederik Thaae; Adam Hillebrandt; Anton Westerlin	3:04
2.	"Tetovo"	Artigeardit	Thaae; Hillebrandt; Westerlin	4:34
3.	"Sidste gang"	Artigeardit	Thaae; Hillebrandt; Westerlin	3:59
4.	"Chart"	Artigeardit	Thaae; Hillebrandt; Westerlin	3:09
5.	"Til mig selv"	Artigeardit	Thaae; Hillebrandt; Westerlin	3:30
6.	"Ensom"	Artigeardit	Thaae; Hillebrandt; Westerlin	2:48
7.	"Snubler"	Artigeardit	Thaae; Hillebrandt; Westerlin	3:22
8.	"Solskin"	Artigeardit; Bette Dandanell; Johannes Wamberg	Thaae; Hillebrandt; Westerlin	3:02
9.	"Alting, Altid"	Artigeardit	Thaae; Hillebrandt; Westerlin	3:06
10.	"Sig hvad du vil"	Artigeardit; Rud Aslak	Thaae; Hillebrandt; Westerlin	3:18
Total length:				33:52

== Charts ==
=== Weekly charts ===
Weekly chart performance
Chart (2023–2026)	Peak position
Danish Albums (Hitlisten)	1

=== Year-end charts ===
Year-end chart performance
Chart	Year	Position
Danish Albums (Hitlisten)	2023	7

== Certifications ==
Certifications
Region	Certification	Certified units/sales
Denmark (IFPI Danmark)	2× Platinum	40,000^{‡}
^{*} Sales figures based on certification alone.^{‡} Sales+streaming figures based on certification alone.
