= Ev1gt&alt1d =

2023 studio album by D1MA

Studio album by D1MA
- Released: 16 March 2023
- Genre: Pop
- Length: 41:59
- Label: 7OUMA Records; Universal Music Denmark
- Producer: Anton Westerlin; Martin René; Alibi Rafeon; Nolan Sarnicki; Frank Moses; Encore; Gabe Lucas

Ev1gt&alt1d (Danish: evigt og altid, lit. 'forever and always', further stylized in all caps) is the debut studio album by the Danish rapper D1MA. The album was released on 16 March 2023 by 7OUMA Records, under the Universal Music Denmark label.

== Release and reception ==
The first mention of D1MA's debut album came in February 2023 during an interview with Soundvenue, where the rapper mentioned he was finishing an album. His performance for the 2023 Roskilde Festival was also being built around the album. A full tour was announced days after the album's release.

Ev1gt&alt1d was released on 16 March 2023. The album received praise from music critics upon its release. Soundvenue highlighted the album as similar to a double album concept, while the album featured both pop and traditional rap songs. D1MA received four-of-six stars from Soundvenue, noting D1MA's success in both musical styles. Gaffa also gave the album four-of-six stars, stating the album was good but not "outstanding". Politiken reviewer Simon Lund gave the album five-of-six stars, calling it one of the best Danish-language albums of the year.

On 29 March, Ev1gt&alt1d debuted on the Hitlisten charts at number one. It maintained the number one position for only one week. By December 2025, the album achieved triple-platinum certification from IFPI Danmark. "Moonlight", the first single from the album, also went on to achieve triple-platinum.

== Accolades ==
In November 2023, for the annual Danish Music Awards, the album received two nominations for awards. Martin René, Anton Westerlin, and Alibi Rafeon were successful in winning Danish Producer of the Year for Ev1gt&alt1d. The album itself received only a nomination for Danish Album of the Year, with D1MA himself receiving several individual nominations. One song from the album, "Moonlight", was also nominated for Hit of the Year at the 2024 EchoPrisen.

Year	Award	Category	Recipient(s)	Result	Ref.
2023	Danish Music Awards	Danish Album of the Year	Ev1gt&alt1d	Nominated	
2023	Danish Music Awards	Danish Producer of the Year	Martin René, Anton Westerlin, and Alibi Rafeon	Won	
2024	EchoPrisen	Hit of the Year	"Moonlight"	Nominated	

== Track listing ==
No.	Title	Lyrics	Producer(s)	Length
1.	"Alle Dør Alene (Intro)"	D1MA	Anton Westerlin	2:25
2.	"Frihed"	D1MA	Westerlin; Martin René	3:07
3.	"For Altid"	D1MA	Westerlin	3:06
4.	"Never Sober"	D1MA	Westerlin	3:22
5.	"Moonlight"	D1MA	Westerlin; Alibi Rafeon	3:17
6.	"Udenfor"	D1MA	Westerlin	2:34
7.	"Til Vi Dør"	D1MA	Westerlin; Rafeon	3:00
8.	"A List (Intro)"	D1MA	Westerlin; Nolan Sarnicki; Frank Moses	2:48
9.	"Dybere"	D1MA	Westerlin	3:06
10.	"For Evigt"	D1MA	Westerlin	2:51
11.	"Forsvinder Altid"	D1MA	Westerlin; Encore; Gabe Lucas	4:13
12.	"7OUMA Freestyle"	D1MA	Westerlin	2:11
13.	"All My Life"	D1MA	Westerlin	3:03
14.	"Herude (Outro)"	D1MA	Westerlin; Encore	2:57
Total length:				41:59

== Charts ==
=== Weekly charts ===
Weekly chart performance
Chart (2023–2025)	Peak position
Danish Albums (Hitlisten)	1

=== Year-end charts ===
Year-end chart performance
Chart	Year	Position
Danish Albums (Hitlisten)	2023	6
Danish Albums (Hitlisten)	2024	17
Danish Albums (Hitlisten)	2025	46

== Certifications ==
Certifications
Region	Certification	Certified units/sales
Denmark (IFPI Danmark)	3× Platinum	60,000^{‡}
^{*} Sales figures based on certification alone.^{‡} Sales+streaming figures based on certification alone.
