= Guldimund =

Danish indie rock musician

- Born: Asger Nordtorp Pedersen; 1992 (age 33–34)
- Origin: Denmark
- Genres: Indie rock
- Years active: 2016–present
- Label: Universal Music Denmark

Asger Nordtorp Pedersen, known professionally as Guldimund, is a Danish indie rock singer-songwriter. He started his career as a solo musician under the stage name Guldimund in 2016, and released two studio albums, Dem, vi plejede at være (2021) and Jeg venter i lyset (2023).

== History ==
Asger was in the choir as a child, and he is a member of TÅRN and Blaue Blume. He began his solo career under the stage name Guldimund in 2016, and released his first studio album Dem, vi plejede at være in 2021. He won three awards in Steppeulven.

In 2023, he released his second studio album, Jeg venter i lyset, which critics described as "the newborn piece of cultural heritage". He performed at the Roskilde Festival.

== Discography ==
=== Studio albums ===
- Dem, vi plejede at være (2021)
- Jeg venter i lyset (2023)
