= Nu hvor vi er her =

2023 studio album by Artigeardit and Lamin

Studio album by Artigeardit and Lamin
- Released: 1 September 2023
- Genre: Hip-hop
- Length: 39:08
- Label: Universal Music Denmark
- Producers: Anton Westerlin; Adam Hillebrandt; JenneJenne; Rob Smyles; Oliver Zoéga; Tuffi; Dan Oskar; August Møller Fogh

Artigeardit chronology
Længe leve (2023)	Nu hvor vi er her (2023)	På gen5yn (2024)

Lamin chronology
Kronisk skeptisk (2022)	Nu hvor vi er her (2023)	De her timer (2024)

Singles from Nu hvor vi er her
- 1. "Vi ku' blive" Released: 22 June 2023

Nu hvor vi er her (lit. 'Now that we're here') is a collaborative studio album by Danish rappers Artigeardit and Lamin. It was released on 1 September 2023 by Universal Music Denmark.

== Release and reception ==
In 2021, Artigeardit and Lamin released their first collaborative work together. The extended play, Ny Agenda, released on 15 October. It was their first collaboration on a record, which followed a trend in the music of Denmark at that time. Their debut EP went on to achieve platinum certification by IFPI Danmark.

After performing the song live at Tinderbox, Artigeardit and Lamin released "Vi ku' blive" on 30 June. With the song reaching number five on the charts, Artigeardit and Lamin released their first studio album together on 1 September. The duo gave an impromptu free concert in the days before release in Kødbyen, the meatpacking district of Vesterbro.

Upon its release, Nu hvor vi er her (lit. 'Now that we're here') received comparisons to Watch the Throne, a collaborative album from American rappers Jay-Z and Kanye West, and was met with a generally positive response. The album consists of 13 tracks, of which nine would make appearances inside the Hitlisten charts. The album became the second consecutive album for Lamin to reach number one, and the third for Artigeardit. Three tracks from the album went on to achieve certification, including "Vi ku' blive" achieving double-platinum.

In the weeks following the album's release, Artigeardit shared a behind-the-scenes documentary of the process in making the album on 26 September 2023. This followed the same process as they had previously done for Ny Agenda.

== Track listing ==
No.	Title	Lyrics	Producer(s)	Length
1.	"Selvfølgelig"	Artigeardit; Lamin	Anton Westerlin; Adam Hillebrandt	3:08
2.	"Ssshhhhh (Shut Up)" (featuring Jelassi)	Artigeardit; Lamin; Jelassi	Westerlin; Hillebrandt	3:06
3.	"Sorte pletter"	Artigeardit; Lamin	JenneJenne; Rob Smyles	3:07
4.	"Dag-til-dag rapper"	Artigeardit; Lamin	Westerlin; Hillebrandt	2:55
5.	"XOXO" (with Icekiid)	Artigeardit; Lamin; Icekiid	Westerlin; Hillebrandt	3:01
6.	"Hva status"	Artigeardit; Lamin	Westerlin; Hillebrandt; Oliver Zoéga; Tuffi	2:57
7.	"Ret god stemning"	Artigeardit; Lamin	Westerlin; Hillebrandt; Dan Oskar	2:51
8.	"God mand/dårlig verden"	Artigeardit; Lamin	Westerlin; Hillebrandt	3:12
9.	"Det her liv"	Artigeardit; Lamin	Westerlin	3:10
10.	"sirjegsindssyg" (with Benjamin Hav)	Artigeardit; Lamin; Hav	Westerlin; Hillebrandt	2:47
11.	"Carplay"	Artigeardit; Lamin	Westerlin; Hillebrandt; Smyles	2:37
12.	"Vi ku' blive"	Artigeardit; Lamin	Westerlin; Hillebrandt	3:27
13.	"Tættere på solen" (with Ida Laurberg)	Artigeardit; Lamin; Laurberg	Westerlin; Hillebrandt; August Møller Fogh	3:50
Total length:				39:08

== Charts ==
=== Weekly charts ===
Weekly chart performance
Chart (2023–2026)	Peak position
Danish Albums (Hitlisten)	1

=== Year-end charts ===
Year-end chart performance
Chart	Year	Position
Danish Albums (Hitlisten)	2023	18
Danish Albums (Hitlisten)	2024	13
Danish Albums (Hitlisten)	2025	52

== Certifications ==
Certifications
Region	Certification	Certified units/sales
Denmark (IFPI Danmark)	3× Platinum	60,000^{‡}
^{*} Sales figures based on certification alone.^{‡} Sales+streaming figures based on certification alone.
