= Icekiid =

Danish rapper and songwriter (born 1996)

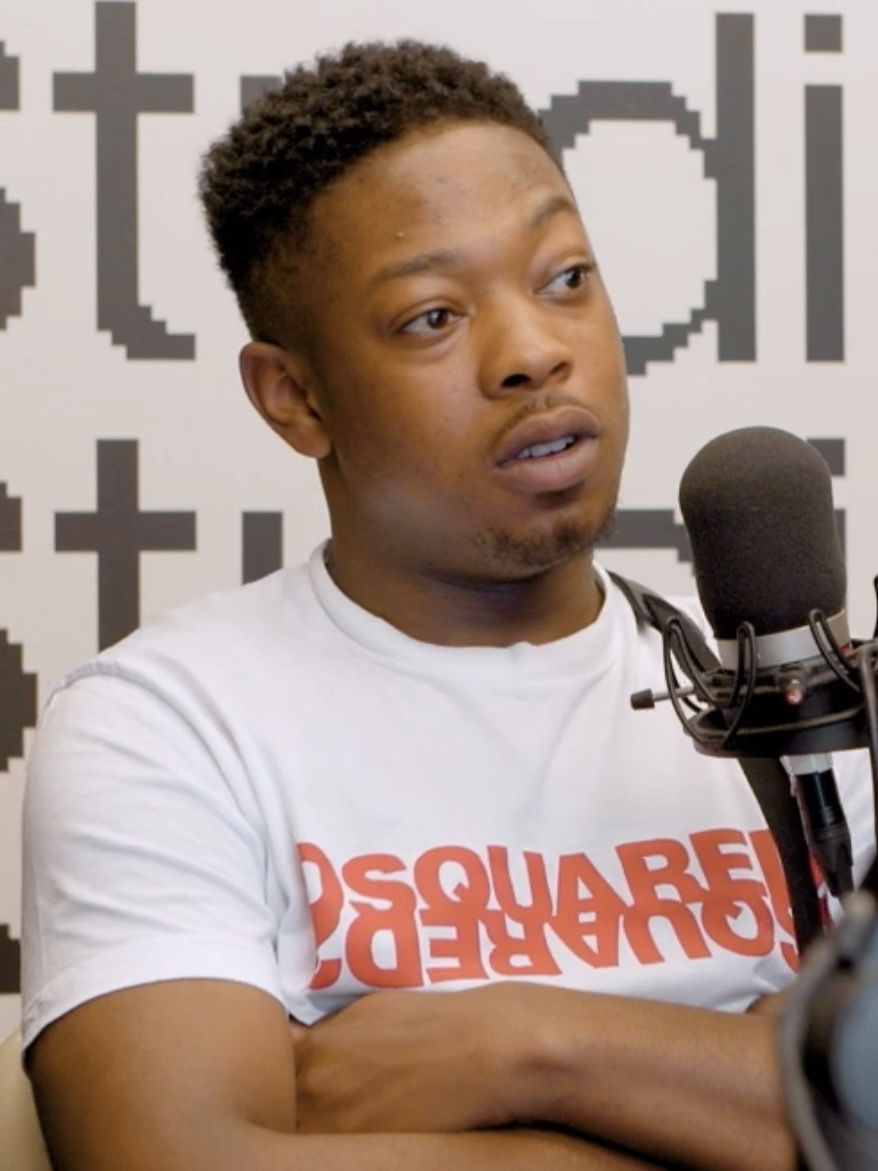
- Icekiid in 2020

Background information
- Also known as: Lil G Boy
- Born: Jermyn Creppy; 7 November 1996 (age 29); Hillerød, Denmark
- Genres: Hip-hop; afrobeat; rhythm and blues
- Occupations: Rapper; songwriter
- Years active: 2015–present
- Labels: Cannibal Records; Universal Music Denmark

Jermyn Creppy (born 7 November 1996), known professionally as Icekiid, is a Danish rapper and songwriter. Releasing one studio album, he has also achieved two number one hits on the Hitlisten charts, notably with his song "ErruDumEllaHvad", which appeared on the 2020 video game FIFA 21.

== Early life ==
Born in Hillerød, in the Capital Region of Denmark, Icekiid's family would often give him musical gifts, including a guitar and other instruments. He also spent time singing in the church choir. In the past, he has talked about his problems of being overweight growing up.

Before becoming Icekiid, Creppy originally performed under the name of Lil G Boy before changing his stage name in 2014. The G was meant to represent Ghana, where his family had its roots.

== Career ==
In June 2015, Icekiid released his debut single entitled "Coco Chanel". His first EP, Afro Dansker, was released on 3 October 2016. The EP included the songs "Blondiner og Brunetter" and "Afrikaner", the latter of which included filming a music video in Ghana. The EP received a mixed response from Soundvenue, which gave it three-of-six stars.

"Gulddans" was released in May 2016 by Icekiid, celebrating F.C. Copenhagen's season in which the team won the Danish Superliga and Danish Cup. The song reached double-platinum certification from IFPI Danmark.

In 2020, Icekiid released the song "ErruDumEllaHvad" which went on to become one of his best known singles. The song reached number one on the Danish top 40 charts on 15 July 2020, and was named as the number four song on Hitlisten's top 100 tracks of 2020. The song appeared on the football video game FIFA 21. In January 2024, the song received its quadruple-platinum certification. He was nominated as "New Danish Name of the Year" at the 2020 Danish Music Awards, though he ultimately did not win the award.

Icekiid's debut studio album, Ingen Roser Uden Torne, was released on 3 June 2022. The album received five-of-six stars from Soundvenue, citing Icekiid's lyrics and afrobeat-centric music as positives. The album received gold certification, and reached number three on the Hitlisten charts on its debut week. "Drippy", a single from the album, also went on to achieve platinum certification.

Icekiid achieved his second appearance on a number one Hitlisten track, appearing on the song "Dark Room" from Tobias Rahim. As part of Rahim's album Vulkanø, the song has since gone double-platinum. At the end of 2024, it was named as the sixth most-streamed song in Denmark.

=== Icekiid 2.0 ===
"Acceleration" was released on 9 January 2026, marking Icekiid's first solo single since 2024. This was followed up with "Wanna Be My Lady" on 23 January. Icekiid rebranded himself as "Icekiid 2.0" with the releases being a shift in both lyrics and beats. "Er vi okay?", a song featuring Blæst, released on 20 March. It reached number 11 on the Hitlisten charts in April. His first live performance came in May, where he performed at Spot. The performance received a positive review from Gaffa.

Kaotisk kunst, Icekiid's fifth EP, was released on 22 May 2026. Soundvenue gave the album five out of six stars, praising the EP as "experimental and personal".

== Discography ==
=== Studio albums ===
Title	Details	Peak chart positions	Certifications
Title	Details	DEN	Certifications
Ingen roser uden torne	Released: 3 June 2022; Label: Cannibal Records	3	IFPI DEN: Gold

=== Extended plays ===
Title	Details	Peak chart positions	Certifications
Title	Details	DEN	Certifications
Afro dansker	Release date: 3 October 2016; Label: Cannibal Records	—	
$tamina szn (Note: Released as collaboration with Kesi)	Release date: 3 May 2019; Label: Cannibal Records	8	IFPI DEN: Gold
72 timer	Release date: 13 November 2020; Labels: disco:wax, Cannibal Records, Sony Music	7	IFPI DEN: Gold
Afro dansker II	Release date: 26 April 2024; Label: Cannibal Records	5	IFPI DEN: Gold
Kaotisk kunst	Released: 22 May 2026; Label: Universal Music Denmark	11	
"—" denotes a recording that did not chart or was not released in that territory.

=== Singles ===
Title	Year	Peak chart positions	Certifications	Album
Title	Year	DEN	Certifications	Album
"Coco Chanel"	2015	—		Non-album singles
"Mansa Musa"	2017	—		Non-album singles
"Brandvarm" (featuring Artigeardit)	2017	—		Non-album singles
"Gulddans"	2017	—	IFPI DEN: 2× Platinum	Non-album singles
"Kamehameha"	2018	35	IFPI DEN: Gold	$tamina szn
"Stamina"	2019	28	IFPI DEN: Gold	$tamina szn
"Cinderella"	2019	32		Non-album singles
"ErruDumEllaHvad"	2020	1	IFPI DEN: 4× Platinum	Non-album singles
"Daggerin'" (with Lamin)	2020	33	IFPI DEN: Gold	Non-album singles
"Get the Bag" (with Kesi)	2020	21		72 Timer
"Baby" (with Kesi)	2020	34		72 Timer
"Cardio" (with Kesi)	2020	14	IFPI DEN: Gold	72 Timer
"No wahala"	2021	27		Non-album singles
"Ingen over"	2021	11	IFPI DEN: Platinum	Non-album singles
"Bagateller"	2021	21	IFPI DEN: Platinum	Non-album singles
"K O L O"	2022	32		Ingen Roser Uden Torne
"Drippy"	2022	11	IFPI DEN: Platinum	Ingen Roser Uden Torne
"Fifty"	2022	26		Ingen Roser Uden Torne
"Hvad skal der ske" (with Lamin)	2022	7	IFPI DEN: 2× Platinum	Non-album singles
"Guantanamo" (with Outlandish)	2022	14	IFPI DEN: Gold	Non-album singles
"xoxo" (with Artigeardit and Lamin)	2023	6	IFPI DEN: Platinum	Nu hvor vi er her
"Je ka jo"	2023	6	IFPI DEN: Platinum	Non-album singles
"Balaclava"	2024	22	IFPI DEN: Gold	Non-album singles
"Cartier linser"	2024	13	IFPI DEN: Gold	Afro Dansker II
"Dark Room" (with Tobias Rahim)	2024	1	IFPI DEN: 2× Platinum	Vulkanø
"Acceleration"	2026	—		Kaotisk kunst
"Wanna Be My Lady"	2026	—		Kaotisk kunst
"Er vi okay?" (with Blæst)	2026	11		Kaotisk kunst
"Fis & ballade" (featuring Benny Jamz)	2026	35		Kaotisk kunst
"—" denotes a recording that did not chart or was not released in that territory.

== Awards and nominations ==
Year	Award	Category	Recipient(s)	Result	Ref.
2017	Celebrate Africa Awards	Afro Inspired Music	Icekiid	Won	
2020	Danish Music Awards	New Danish Name of the Year	Icekiid	Nominated	
2020	ZULU Awards	New Name of the Year	Icekiid	Nominated	
2022	Danish Music Awards	Danish Soloist of the Year	Icekiid	Nominated	
