= Lamin (rapper) =

Danish rapper and songwriter (born 1995)

- Also known as: Lamin; Lams; Wavy
- Born: Lamin Nørlem Samba; 16 May 1995 (age 31); Nørrebro, Denmark
- Genres: Hip-hop; rap; afrobeat
- Occupations: Rapper; songwriter
- Years active: 2019–present
- Labels: Def Jam Recordings; Force Majeure Records
Association football career
Youth career
- 2014–2015: Lyngby
- 2015: BK Avarta
Senior career*
Years	Team	Apps	(Gls)
2015–2016	B.93	0	(0)
2017	Brønshøj BK		
- * Club domestic league appearances and goals

Lamin Nørlem Samba (born 16 May 1995), known mononymously as Lamin, is a Danish rapper and songwriter.

Intending to pursue a career in football, injuries sent Lamin into teaching and later he turned to music. He has released four solo studio albums and two extended plays, with two of the studio albums reaching number one on the Danish top 40 charts. His 2024 album, SkyLL, won Danish Album of the Year at the Danish Music Awards. He has been nominated and won multiple solo awards, including New Danish Name of the Year in 2022 and the P3 Prize at DR's P3 Guld 's awards in 2024.

== Early life ==
Lamin Nørlem Samba was born on 16 May 1995 in Nørrebro, Denmark. His parents moved from Nørrebro to the Tingbjerg neighborhood of Brønshøj-Husum before his second birthday, where he and his brother were raised by their mother. His mother is Danish from Mors, and his father, of Gambian-origin, returned to the Gambia when he was five years old. His father was absent for much of his life, except for phone calls, until his father's death when Lamin was 15 years old. He later discussed his refusal to visit his father's grave, even if he knew where its location was.

While attending Gefion Gymnasium, Lamin trained every morning to play football. He played football from a young age, alongside childhood friend Kevin Tshiembe. He became captain of Lyngby BK's under-19 team, playing as a defender. Though he appeared on the bench in Danish 1st Division games, he did not make an appearance for the first team before departing during the winter of 2015, moving to Danish 2nd Division club BK Avarta. He also spent time at Boldklubben af 1893, appearing in a first round match of the 2015–16 Danish Cup, where the team defeated Sundby BK 4–1. After picking up a long-term injury, which left him unable to play, he left the club in February 2016. In March 2017, he joined Brønshøj BK on a short-term contract.

Lamin later dropped football completely following recurring shoulder injuries, instead opting to pursue a career as a teacher. He finished his education in June 2021, days before the release of his first studio album.

== Career ==
=== Debut album and collaboration ===
Lamin released his first single, "Tiger", on 31 May 2019. At the time of releasing his first songs, he stated that he was unsure if he still wanted to pursue music and become a "public person." His second single, "Trabajo", followed shortly after in July. A year later, in October 2020, he released his debut EP, Tour. The release was accompanied by a music video alongside Icekiid with the song "Daggerin'". His debut EP received praise as he was named as one of the top 15 Danish rappers to "watch out for in the future" by Soundvenue. The EP went on to peak at number 21 on the Danish top 40 charts, and achieved gold certification from IFPI Danmark.

Hva ved de om Lams (lit. 'What do they know about Lams?') was released on 25 June 2021, nine days after Lamin turned in his bachelor thesis to complete his bachelor's degree. The album, released under the Def Jam Recordings label, debuted at number ten on the Hitlisten charts. As of November 2025, the album has spent 102 weeks on the top 40 charts in Denmark, and has achieved triple-platinum status.

Lamin would find continued success with his first collaborative album with fellow Danish rapper Artigeardit when the duo released Ny Agenda (lit. 'New Agenda') on 15 October 2021. The album, produced by Anton Westerlin, was preceded the release of a single from the album, "Hvor fuck er min drink." A behind-the-scenes documentary was also released on YouTube, showcasing how the record was made and produced while the duo was in Greece. The EP's release marked the second record for both artists, as Artigeardit had released his own studio album months prior in May, and followed a trend of collaborative projects produced by other Danish duos. The album was seen as "fun", but lacked the "disciplined and streamlined" process that Artigeardit's studio albums typically followed according to one review.

=== Second album and awards ===
Lamin announced his first concert of 2022 would take place in March at Store Vega, following previously sold out shows at Lille Vega in 2021. The year also opened up other opportunities for live performances to Lamin, where he performed at Spot in May. He also played in the days preceding the opening of Roskilde Festival in June. The performance received praise, citing appearances from other musicians including Artigeardit.

Lamin's sophomore album, Kronisk Skeptisk (lit. 'Chronic Skeptic'), was released on 2 September and became his first number one album when it appeared on the Hitlisten charts on 14 September. The album contained the songs "Gode dage, gode drinks" and "Hvad skal der ske", both of which went on to receive double-platinum certifications and appear inside of the top 10 on the Danish charts. The album received generally positive reviews from critics, who noted the catchy songs while others believed it failed to produce anything exciting. The album since has gone on to become Lamin's only quintuple-platinum album, and finished 2022 as the sixth most-streamed album of the year in Denmark on Spotify.

In late September 2022, Lamin received the first major award nomination as he was named as a finalist for DR's P3 Guld awards. He was nominated for the P3 Talent award and, like the other nominees for the award, performed during the event itself. He was named as the winner of the award and the accompanying DKK 100,000 prize. Lamin received further award nominations when IFPI's Danish Music Awards took place in late November, receiving solo nominations for New Danish Name of the Year and New Danish Live Name of the Year, and a collaborative award alongside Artigeardit for their Ny Agenda EP. Lamin finished as a runner-up for two of the awards, though he did manage to take his second award of the year with the New Danish Name of the Year award.

=== Continued collaborations and third album ===
From late 2022 to early 2023, Lamin was part of several collaborations that appeared on the Hitlisten charts, including "Drop Top" produced by Mike Lowrey and featuring British rapper Stepz. The song, a remake of the 2006 song "Kig forbi" from Johnson, peaked at number 18. He also featured in songs from Tessa, Gilli, and Blæst, which saw Lamin praised for his variation in styles and genres. Meanwhile he continued to work closely with Artigeardit, performing as a duo at Tinderbox in Odense in late June 2023.

After performing the song live at Tinderbox, Artigeardit and Lamin released "Vi ku' blive" on 30 June. With the song reaching number five on the charts, Artigeardit and Lamin released their first studio album together on 1 September. The duo gave an impromptu free concert in the days before release in Kødbyen, the meatpacking district of Vesterbro. Nu hvor vi er her (lit. 'Now that we're here') received comparisons to Watch the Throne, a collaborative album from American rappers Jay-Z and Kanye West, and was met with a generally positive response. The album consisted of 13 tracks, of which nine would make appearances inside the Hitlisten charts. The album became the second consecutive album for Lamin to reach number one, and the third for Artigeardit. Three tracks from the album went on to achieve certification, including "Vi ku' blive" achieving double-platinum.

Lamin was again nominated for several awards at the 2023 Danish Music Awards, including Danish Soloist of the Year and Danish Group of the Year, the latter being alongside Artigeardit. Unlike the previous year's show, Lamin left without winning in either category. In early 2024, Lamin received another award nomination at EchoPrisen in February. Nominated for Musician of the Year, the award was instead awarded to Hans Philip.

=== De Her Timer and SkyLL ===
Lamin released his third EP, De her timer (lit. 'These Hours'), on 31 May 2024. Produced by Anton Westerlin, the EP was noted as a departure from his previous albums, venturing into the afrobeat music that was a trend in Danish music at the time. Soundvenue gave the album five of six stars, complimenting the different sound while maintaining strong lyrics. The EP would again earn Lamin a number three spot on the Hitlisten charts. The following month, he was again called to perform at his second Roskilde, opening the Orange stage for that year's festival. The show was Lamin's only festival appearance of the summer, a change from previous years. His performance received overwhelmingly positive reviews from critics, with B.T. calling the show "perfect."

After releasing hints on his Instagram in early September, Lamin released his fourth studio album on 19 September 2024, SkyLL. The album was a return to previous hip-hop sounds; it was noted for several tracks which discussed his early life, from his father leaving him without a male role model to praising his mother for being a single parent. Just as his previous studio album, SkyLL sent a total of eight songs to the Hitlisten charts, with "H V D O L" receiving platinum certification. The album also reached number nine on Spotify's top 10 global albums for the weekend of September 20–22, 2024.

As with previous years, Lamin was again the a recipient of numerous award nominations from the Danish Music Awards and DR's P3 Guld. SkyLL was his first nomination and award win for Danish Album of the Year, while he took the top award of P3 Prize at P3 Guld. His feature on Annika's song "Stolt" earned a nomination for P3's Listener Hit, a song which also became a number one hit in Denmark. He also received and won the Danish Hip-hop Release of the Year at the 2025 GAFFA Awards, making it the second award for SkyLL. In December 2025, he was named as the second most-streamed artist in Denmark on Spotify.

=== Wavy ===
In his first release of 2026, Lamin's song "Låst inde" reached number four on the Hitlisten charts. On 18 June, he announced via Instagram that he would hold a concert later that night at Pumphuset in Copenhagen for just 500 people. That night, he released a surprise album with only 30 minutes notice on his Instagram. His fourth solo studio album, Wavy, released at midnight. The album went on to become a number-one hit. In October, Lea Romea released the single "Se på mig" featuring Lamin—his first single of the year.

== Discography ==
=== Solo studio albums ===
- Hva ved de om Lams (2021)
- Kronisk skeptisk (2022)
- SkyLL (2024)
- Wavy (2026)

=== Collaborative albums ===
- Nu hvor vi er her (with Artigeardit) (2023)

== Awards and nominations ==
Year	Award	Category	Recipient(s)	Result	Ref.
2022	Danish Music Awards	New Danish Name of the Year	Lamin	Won	
2022	Danish Music Awards	Danish Songwriter of the Year	Artigeardit and Lamin (for Ny Agenda)	Nominated	
2022	Danish Music Awards	New Danish Live Name of the Year	Lamin	Nominated	
2022	P3 Guld	P3 Talent	Lamin	Won	
2023	Danish Music Awards	Danish Group of the Year	Artigeardit and Lamin	Nominated	
2023	Danish Music Awards	Danish Soloist of the Year	Lamin	Nominated	
2024	Danish Music Awards	Danish Album of the Year	SkyLL	Won	
2024	Danish Music Awards	Danish Soloist of the Year	Lamin	Nominated	
2024	Danish Music Awards	Danish Songwriter of the Year	Lamin	Nominated	
2024	EchoPrisen	Musician of the Year	Lamin	Nominated	
2024	P3 Guld	P3 Prize	Lamin	Won	
2025	GAFFA Awards	Danish Hip-hop Release of the Year	SkyLL	Won	
2025	P3 Guld	P3 Listener Hit	"Stolt" (Annika featuring Lamin)	Nominated	
