= Kesi (rapper) =

Danish rapper (born 1992)

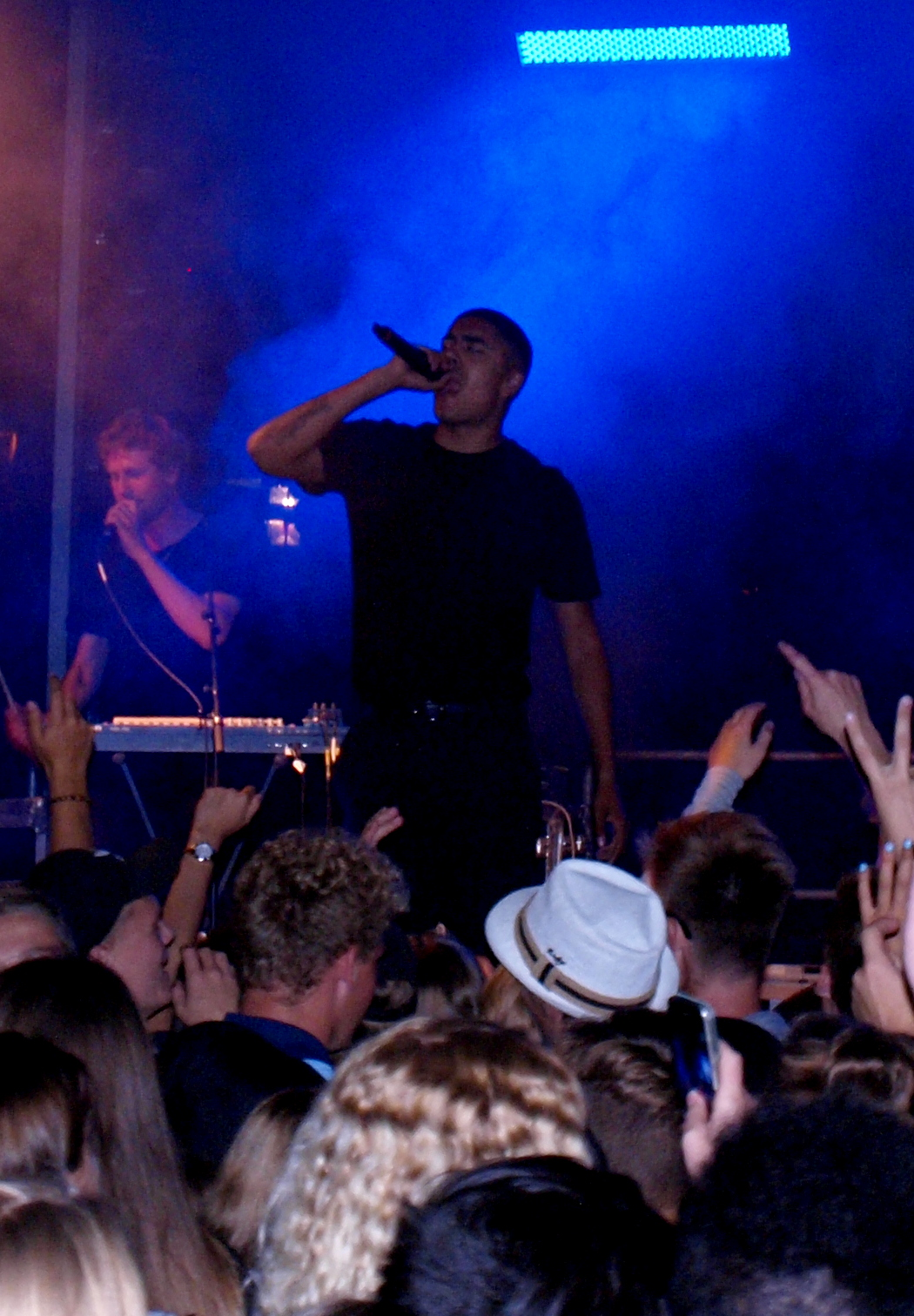
- Kesi at Kolding kulturnat (21 August 2015)

Background information
- Also known as: Kesi
- Born: Oliver Kesi Chambuso; 7 September 1992 (age 34); Copenhagen, Denmark
- Genres: Hip hop; pop
- Occupations: Rapper; singer; songwriter
- Instrument: Vocals
- Years active: 2010–present
- Labels: disco:wax; Uropa / MXIII; Universal Records Denmark

Oliver Kesi Chambuso (born 7 September 1992), known professionally as Kesi (Danish pronunciation: [ˈkʰe̝ːsi]), is a Danish rapper, singer and songwriter.

Kesi initially promoted himself through his own YouTube channel within the grime genre, also cooperating with others, notably Kidd and Gilli. In addition to his solo career, Kesi was a member of the hip hop group BOC (abbreviation for Bars of Crack or Bombs Over Copenhagen or Bombs Over Centrum), a Nørrebro-based group. Success on the Internet with particularly debut song "Byen Sover" led to a series of concerts and interest from established record labels, meaning that Kesi, at the age of 18, signed with Universal Records in July 2011.

In August 2011, Kesi released his first official single "Slem dreng". This brought in huge media visibility, and an appearance on Danish broadcaster, TV 2 in a special feature Kesi also performed in a series of concerts, including at Roskilde Festival, Copenhagen Distortion and festival Sounds. His follow-up single on Universal was the single "Født I Dag", produced by Benny Jamz from BOC and also the single "Ku godt". His debut album Bomber Over Centrum was released in February 2012, followed by Ung hertug (2013) and Barn af Byen (2015).

During the following years, Kesi mostly focused on releasing singles, with "Følelsen", "Ligesom mig", "Kom over", "Su casa" (featuring Gilli), and "X" all topping the Danish charts between 2017 and 2019. After taking a five year break from albums, Kesi released his fourth studio album, BO4L, in 2020.

== Discography ==
=== Albums ===
Year	Title	Peak chart positions
Year	Title	DEN
2012	Bomber over centrum	9
2013	Ung hertug	5
2015	Barn af byen	3
2020	BO4L	1
2021	Mere End Musik (with Benny Jamz and Gilli featuring B.O.C)	1
2022	30 somre	1
2023	Tillykke	2
2024	FOMO 88.8 FM	1
2026	Men så kom i morgen	1

=== EPs ===
Year	Title	Peak chart positions
Year	Title	DEN
2019	888	2
2020	72 timer (with Icekiid)	7
2025	Supernova	4

=== Singles ===
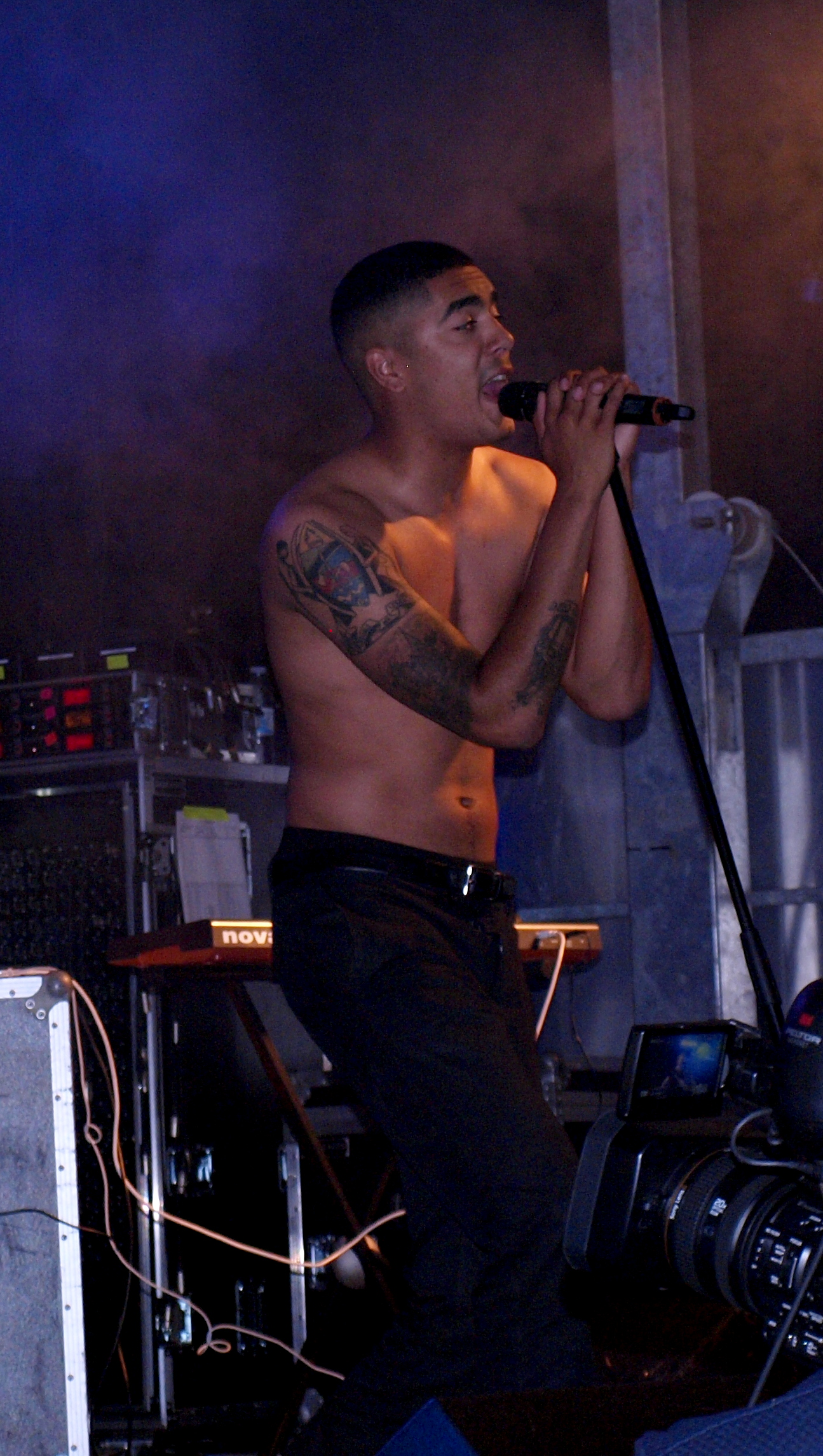
Kesi at Kolding kulturnat (21 August 2015)

Year	Title	Peak chart positions	Album
Year	Title	DEN	Album
2011	"Slem Dreng"	10	Bomber over centrum
2011	"Født i dag"	30	Bomber over centrum
2012	"Ku godt"	9	Bomber over centrum
2012	"Gadehjørne" (featuring Gilli & Mass Ebdrup)	17	Bomber over centrum
2014	"Søvnløs"	1	Barn af byen
2015	"Dumme penge" (featuring Don Stefano)	11	Barn af byen
2017	"God dag"	9	Non-album singles
2017	"Consigliere" (featuring Gilli)	11	Non-album singles
2017	"Mamacita" (featuring Benny Jamz)	4	Non-album singles
2017	"Op" (featuring Gilli and Benny Jamz)	5	Non-album singles
2017	"Designer" (featuring Gilli)	17	Non-album singles
2017	"Følelsen"	2	Non-album singles
2018	"Ligesom mig"	3	Non-album singles
2018	"Kom Over"	1	Non-album singles
2018	"Ekstra"	3	Non-album singles
2018	"Su casa" (featuring Gilli)	1	Non-album singles
2019	"X"	1	Non-album singles
2019	"Pengedans"	3	Non-album singles
2019	"Vågn op" (featuring Don Stefano)	3	888
2020	"Tilbage" (featuring Hennedub)	1	BO4L
2020	"Blå Himmel" (featuring Hans Philip)	1	BO4L
2021	"Er Her" (with Artigeardit)	1	Non-album single
2022	"Mona Lisa" (featuring Lord Siva)	8	30 somre
2023	"Hustle & kærlighed" (with Tessa and Icekiid)	14	Non-album singles
2023	"Hjem/Videre"	15	Non-album singles
2023	"Topform"	7	Tillykke
2023	"Har du det sådan her?" (with Josef)	40	Non-album singles
2024	"Sprite & Vodka" (with Noah Carter and Gilli)	6	Non-album singles
2024	"Eneste" (with Mas)	19	Non-album singles
2025	"Flad af grin" (featuring Noah Carter and Benny Jamz)	5	Supernova
2025	"Supernova" (featuring Noah Carter)	21	Supernova
2026	"Drukner" (featuring Annika)	1	Men så kom i morgen
2026	"Hver eneste gang" (with Thor Farlov and Mas)	6	Non-album single

Featured on

Year	Single	Peak chart positions	Album
Year	Single	DEN	Album
2013	"Kysset med Medina" (Hedegaard featuring Kesi)	25	Non-album singles
2016	"Adios" (Gilli featuring Kesi)	20	Non-album singles
2018	"Tjep" (Benny Jamz featuring Kesi)	10	Non-album singles
2024	"Aret ud" (Kimbo featuring Kesi and Noah Carter)	39	Non-album singles
2024	"Barn af byen Freestyle" (Anton Westerlin featuring Kesi)	25	Non-album singles

=== Other charted songs ===
Year	Title	Peak chart positions	Album
Year	Title	DEN	Album
2019	"BDK" (featuring Gilli)	2	888
2019	"Hele vejen" (featuring Gilli)	10	888
2019	"1 nat"	11	888
2019	"Ik sadan der" (featuring Benny Jamz)	21	888
2019	"Ung & dum"	24	888
2020	"Hygger Mig Pt. 2" (featuring Gilli)	8	BO4L
2020	"Baku" (featuring Icekiid)	12	BO4L
2020	"Snak Lidt Med Mig"	15	BO4L
2020	"Ik Tænk" (featuring Benny Jamz)	16	BO4L
2020	"Niveauer"	19	BO4L
2020	"Fokus/Nætter" (featuring Benny Jamz and Kimbo)	26	BO4L
2020	"Forretning" (featuring Sivas)	27	BO4L
2020	"10 Timer"	29	BO4L
2020	"Om Igen" (featuring Noah Carter)	36	BO4L
2022	"Ik noget nyt"	35	30 somre
2022	"Højt oppe" (featuring Emil Goll)	38	30 somre
2022	"Hva så" (featuring Artigeardit)	21	30 somre
2022	"Skør for dig" (featuring Jada)	8	30 somre
2022	"Balance" (with Lamin and Benny Jamz)	11	Kronisk skeptisk
2023	"Slide"	23	Tillykke
2023	"10 ud af 10"	28	Tillykke
2023	"Hele vejen ind"	33	Tillykke
2026	"Men så kom i morgen"	13	Men så kom i morgen
2026	"Stil permanent"	3	Men så kom i morgen
2026	"GPS"	7	Men så kom i morgen
2026	"Elefanter"	17	Men så kom i morgen
2026	"Adrenalin" (featuring Kundo)	4	Men så kom i morgen
2026	"Hvor blev tiden af" (featuring Hans Philip)	11	Men så kom i morgen
2026	"Interstellar"	27	Men så kom i morgen
2026	"Forbi" (featuring Burhan G)	26	Men så kom i morgen
2026	"Hver dag/Lang tid siden"	14	Men så kom i morgen
2026	"Hvem ellers"	28	Men så kom i morgen
