= Ukendt Kunstner =

Danish hip-hop group

- Origin: Copenhagen, Denmark
- Genres: Hip hop; pop; R&B
- Years active: 2012–2016, 2023-present
- Labels: Sony Music; No3; Forbandet Ungdom
- Members: Hans Philip; Jens Ole Wowk McCoy
- Website: www.ukendtkunstner.dk

Ukendt Kunstner (Danish: [ˈuˌkʰenˀt ˈkʰɔnstnɐ]; English: 'Unknown Artist') is a Danish hip hop group from Copenhagen, founded in 2012 by rapper Hans Philip and producer Jens Ole Wowk McCoy. They were signed to the label Sony Music Denmark.

The duo started under the name Skørmand before changing it to Ukendt Kunstner. They released their commercial debut single "København" in 2012, taken from their mixtape Hælervarer, and gained widespread fame through their first album Neonlys and its title track. In 2013, they were nominated for "Danish Urban Release" during the Danish Music Awards and in 2014 nominations for P3 Guld for "P3 Talent" and "P3 listening hit". In 2014, they released their follow-up album Forbandede Ungdom.

At Danish Music Awards 2014, they won the prize as "Årets Danske Gruppe", which translates to "Danish Group of the Year". In December 2016, after the release of their third album, Den Anden Side, they announced that they had decided to stop making music together. In May 2023, they released a fourth studio album, Dansktop, which reformed the Danish duo.

== Discography ==
=== Albums ===
Year	Album	Peak positions
Year	Album	DEN
2013	Neonlys	14
2014	Forbandede Ungdom	2
2016	Den Anden Side	3
2023	Dansktop	1

=== EPs ===
- Hælervarer, Side A (2012)
- Hælervarer, Side B (2012)

=== Singles ===
Year	Single	Peak positions	Album
Year	Single	DEN	Album
2012	"København" (featuring Murro)	—	Hælervarer, Side A
2013	"Neonlys"	22	Neonlys
2014	"Alting / Ingenting"	14	Forbandede Ungdom
2014	"Stein Bagger" (featuring S!vas)	31	Forbandede Ungdom
2016	"Lige nu" (featuring S!vas)	35	Den Anden Side
2023	"Uden dig"	1	Dansktop

== Discography: Hans Philip ==
=== Albums ===
Year	Title	Peak positions
Year	Title	DEN
2019	Forevigt	
2022	[α]	1
2022	[β]	

=== Singles ===
Year	Title	Peak positions
Year	Title	DEN
2019	"V"	4

=== Other charting songs ===
Year	Title	Peak positions
Year	Title	DEN
2019	"Saa blaa"	12
2019	"Siger ingenting"	15
2019	"Drenge & piger"	19
2019	"Et studie i overtænkning"	34

== Discography: Jens Ole McCoy ==
=== Albums ===
- 2017: Underverden (Original Motion Picture Score) for Darkland a film by Fenar Ahmad
- 2019: Valhalla (Original Motion Picture Score) for Valhalla a film by Fenar Ahmad
- 2024: Jens Ole McCoy

=== Singles ===
Year	Title
2019	"Dawn" (with Noah Carter)
