= Artigeardit =

Albanian-Danish rapper (born 1996)

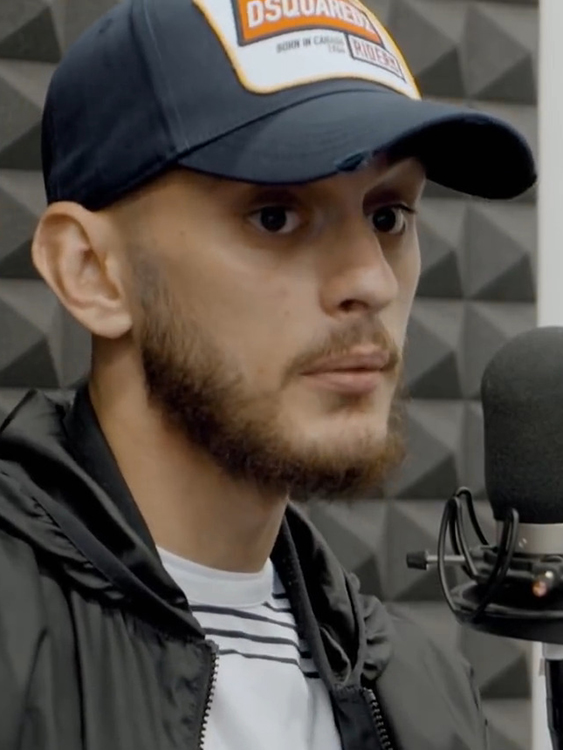
- Artigeardit in 2020

Background information
- Born: Ardit Aliti; May 1996 (age 30); Herlev, Denmark
- Genre: Hip-hop
- Occupation: Rapper
- Years active: 2015–present
- Labels: Def Jam Recordings Denmark; Universal Music Denmark

Ardit Aliti (born May 1996), known professionally as Artigeardit, is an Albanian-Danish rapper. He has released six solo studio albums, four of which have gone to number one on the Danish top 40 charts. Two of his albums, Held & lykke med at komme hjem and Længe leve, have won Danish Album of the Year from the Danish Music Awards.

== Early life ==
Aliti was born in May 1996 at Herlev Hospital to Albanian parents, who immigrated from North Macedonia. He grew up in Mørkhøj in the Gladsaxe Municipality with his parents and older sister. He began writing lyrics at 12 years old, though he did not begin working on music until years later. Friends encouraged him to join a local music space which was intended as a community server for younger people in the area.

== Career ==
Artigeardit's began promoting himself through SoundCloud, releasing one of his first songs on 21 August 2015. The song, "Hold det 100", was a freestyle rap over the track "100" by American rapper The Game. On 4 March 2016, Artigeardit released his debut EP, Fristelse fordærver. During the process of creating the album, he dropped out of Frederiksberg Gymnasium during his third year. He stated that he regretted not completing his secondary education, though it did allow him to focus on his music.

In December 2021, he was named as the ninth most streamed artist in Denmark on Spotify, with "Er her" finishing the seventh most streamed song. His album Held & lykke med at komme hjem also finished in the last spot of the top 10 most played albums of the year.

Artigeardit's fourth studio album, titled Længe leve, was released on 27 January 2023. The album received high praise from music critics, including Soundvenue writer Kristian Karl who stated, "Længe leve is the album Artigeardit will be remembered for." Politiken writer Pernille Jensen stated that the rapper had created "his masterpiece". His second album of the year, a collaboration with fellow rapper Lamin, was released on 1 September 2023. Nu hvor vi er her received comparison's to Watch the Throne, a collaborative album from American rappers Jay-Z and Kanye West, and was met with a generally positive response. In December 2025, he was named as the sixth most-streamed artist in Denmark on Spotify.

Artigeardit had a surprise release for his sixth solo EP on 13 February 2026. Titled Pusto, the EP contained six tracks, and included features from Kesi, Noah Carter, and Icekiid. After releasing two singles in the following months, he announced the release of his next album, Den lange vej. The album was released on 5 June 2026.

== Personal life ==
Artigeardit admitted to heavy use and addiction to Xanax for years. During a podcast interview with DR, he stated that during 2019, he spent spent several days in a row using drugs while partying and drank alcohol every day. Following a concert, he stated a 15-year-old boy approached him and asked the rapper for Xanax, a prescription drug that Artigeardit and other rappers had mentioned in several songs. He stated that the encounter caused him to reflect on the consequences of his actions and, by 2021, he had stopped Xanax use entirely.

Artigeardit became a father in 2023, revealing the birth of his son. Questions about him possibly becoming a father started following the release of his song "Sig hvad du vil", with the lyrics mentioning having a baby on the way.

== Discography ==
=== Solo studio albums ===
- Vildedage, 2018
- Idiot, 2020
- Held & lykke med at komme hjem, 2021
- Længe leve, 2023
- Æteren, 2025
- Den lange vej, 2026

=== Collaborative studio albums ===
- Nu hvor vi er her (with Lamin), 2023

=== Solo extended plays ===
- Fristelse fordærver, 2016
- 2.0 EP, 2019
- 3p, 2019
- Elev4tormusik, 2020
- På gen5yn, 2024
- Pusto, 2026

=== Collaborative extended plays ===
- Ny agenda (with Lamin), 2021

== Awards and nominations ==
Year	Award	Category	Recipient(s)	Result	Ref.
2020	Danish Music Awards	New Danish Name of the Year	Artigeardit	Nominated	
2020	Danish Music Awards	Danish Songwriter of the Year	Artigeardit (for Idiot)	Nominated	
2020	Danish Music Awards	New Danish Live Name of the Year	Artigeardit	Nominated	
2020	P3 Guld	The Prize	Artigeardit	Nominated	
2021	Danish Music Awards	Danish Album of the Year	Held & lykke med at komme hjem	Won	
2021	Danish Music Awards	Danish Soloist of the Year	Artigeardit	Nominated	
2021	Danish Music Awards	Danish Streaming Hit of the Year	"Er Her" (Artigeardit x Kesi)	Nominated	
2021	Danish Music Awards	Danish Songwriter of the Year	Held & lykke med at komme hjem	Nominated	
2021	GAFFA Awards	Danish Hip-hop Release of the Year	Idiot	Nominated	
2021	P3 Guld	Listener Hit	"Er Her" (Artigeardit x Kesi)	Nominated	
2022	Danish Music Awards	Danish Songwriter of the Year	"Ny Agenda" (Artigeardit & Lamin)	Nominated	
2022	Danish Music Awards	Danish Live Name of the Year	Artigeardit	Nominated	
2022	GAFFA Awards	Danish Hip-hop Release of the Year	Held & lykke med at komme hjem	Nominated	
2022	ZULU Awards	Hit of the Year	"Er Her" (Artigeardit x Kesi)	Nominated	
2022	ZULU Awards	Artist of the Year	Artigeardit	Nominated	
2023	Danish Music Awards	Danish Album of the Year	Længe leve	Won	
2023	Danish Music Awards	Danish Group of the Year	Artigeardit & Lamin	Nominated	
2023	Danish Music Awards	Danish Songwriter of the Year	Længe Leve	Nominated	
2023	Danish Music Awards	Danish Live Name of the Year	Artigeardit	Won	
2023	EchoPrisen	Musician of the Year	Artigeardit	Won	
2023	P3 Guld	The Prize	Artigeardit	Won	
2024	GAFFA Awards	Danish Release of the Year	Længe Leve	Nominated	
2024	GAFFA Awards	Danish Hip-hop Release of the Year	Længe Leve	Nominated	
2025	P3 Guld	Listener Hit	"Lonely" (Josva featuring Artigeardit)	Nominated	
