= Anton Westerlin =

Danish producer and songwriter (born 1994)

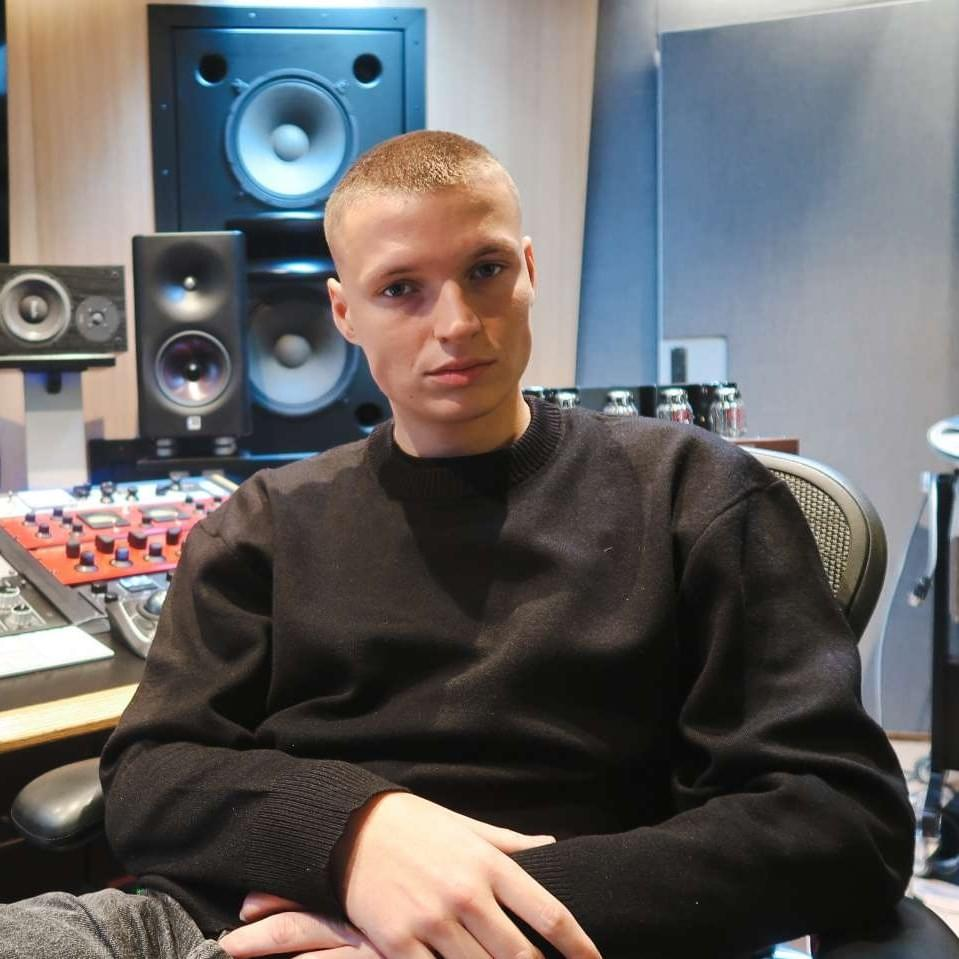
- Westerlin in 2024

Background information
- Born: Anton Westerlin Kjeldsen; 16 December 1994 (age 31); Copenhagen, Denmark
- Origin: Hørsholm, Denmark
- Genres: Hip-hop; pop
- Occupations: Producer; songwriter
- Years active: 2018–present
- Label: Universal Music Denmark
- Website: www.antonwesterlin.dk

Anton Westerlin Kjeldsen (born 16 December 1994) is a Danish record producer and songwriter. As a producer, he helped create multiple number one songs and albums on the Danish charts. He won Producer of the Year at the 2023 and 2024 Danish Music Awards. As an artist, he has released one studio album and one compilation album, both of which have achieved number-one on the Danish charts.

== Career ==
=== Early life and production ===
Raised in Hørsholm, Westerlin became a self-taught producer, beginning as a teenager in his bedroom where he remixed songs. Since 2018, his work as a producer became known for producing tracks for several Danish musicians including Artigeardit, Blæst, D1MA, Kesi, Lamin, and Tessa.

Westerlin began releasing freestyles in 2024 on his YouTube program Bag Gadinerne. The first single, "Chanel Freestyle" with Lamin, reached number one on the Hitlisten charts in its first week and later received platinum certification. His work on production received praise from the Danish music industry, when he was first nominated as Danish Producer of the year at the 2022 Danish Music Awards. Despite not winning the award, he was nominated again the following year where he won for his work on D1MA's debut album, Ev1gt&alt1d. He was also nominated for his work on Artigeardit's album, Længe Leve.

=== Debut album ===
Westerlin released the first single from his debut album Godaften on 24 January. The song, "Blodigt", featured pop singer Annika. The song received four out of six stars from Soundvenue, who described the song as a "flirtatious, lightly soulful house track." The song reached number one on the Danish top 40 charts and, by May, had received double-platinum certification from IFPI Danmark. The second song from Godaften was released on 7 March. "Entré", featuring Lamin and Ozzy, had previously been played live at Forum in Frederiksberg on 23 February, with the preview uploaded to YouTube the following day. Like "Blodigt", the song reached number one on the Danish charts and achieved platinum certification. Two months later on 15 May, "Handsome" featuring Benjamin Hav, Josva, and Gilli was released as the final single ahead of the album's release.

Godaften, Westerlin's debut album as an artist, released on 23 May 2025, receiving high praise from Politiken writer Pernille Jensen. The album rose to number one on the Danish charts on its debut on 4 June, reaching quadruple-platinum certification in September 2026.

Westerlin performed at Roskilde Festival, Denmark's largest music festival, in July 2025. His performance received praise from music critics, noting his inclusion of 16–18 different musicians making appearances during his show. He was nominated in late September 2025 for DR P3's annual awards show, P3 Guld as the P3 Talent. In December 2025, he was named as one of the most-streamed artists in Denmark on Spotify, finishing at #10.

=== Second album ===
On his YouTube channel, while with Annika, Westerlin teased a song before announcing the release a second album on 1 May 2026 on Spotify. On 13 May, the album was the number one album in Denmark for the week.

== Discography ==
=== Studio albums ===
Title	Details	Peak chart positions	Certifications
Title	Details	DEN	Certifications
Godaften	Released: 23 May 2025; Label: Universal Music Denmark	1	IFPI DEN: 4× Platinum

=== Compilation albums ===
Title	Details	Peak chart positions	Certifications
Title	Details	DEN	Certifications
Bag gardinerne S1+S2	Released: 1 May 2026; Label: Universal Music Denmark	1	IFPI DEN: Platinum

=== Singles ===
Title	Year	Peak chart positions	Certifications	Album
Title	Year	DEN	Certifications	Album
"Chanel Freestyle" (with Lamin)	2024	1	IFPI DEN: Platinum	Non-album singles
"Bellingham Freestyle" (with Kundo)	2024	25	IFPI DEN: Gold	Non-album singles
"Barn af byen Freestyle" (with Kesi)	2024	25		Non-album singles
"2 stepper Freestyle" (with Benny Jamz)	2024	6	IFPI DEN: Gold	Non-album singles
"Blodigt" (featuring Annika)	2025	1	IFPI DEN: Platinum	Godaften
"Entré" (featuring Lamin & Ozzy)	2025	1	IFPI DEN: Platinum	Godaften
"Handsome" (featuring Benjamin Hav, JOSVA, and Gilli)	2025	4	IFPI DEN: Platinum	Godaften
"Hvad forventer de Freestyle" (with Artigeardit)	2025	—		Bag gardinerne S1+S2
"Savage Freestyle" (with Tessa)	2025	—		Bag gardinerne S1+S2
"Ai Freestyle" (with Ozzy)	2025	2	IFPI DEN: Gold	Bag gardinerne S1+S2
"Minder hos andre Freestyle" (with Mille)	2026	1	IFPI DEN: Gold	Bag gardinerne S1+S2
"—" denotes a recording that did not chart or was not released in that territory.

=== Other charted songs ===
Title	Year	Peak chart positions	Certifications	Album
Title	Year	DEN	Certifications	Album
"Hørt det før" (featuring Pil, Annika, Mille, & Medina)	2025	3	IFPI DEN: Platinum	Godaften
"SpaceJam Freestyle" (with Icekiid)	2026	17		Bag gardinerne S1+S2
"Lagkagenhuset Freestyle" (with Michael Williams)	2026	10		Bag gardinerne S1+S2
"Ærlig Freestyle" (with Annika)	2026	1		Bag gardinerne S1+S2

== Awards and nominations ==
Year	Award	Category	Recipient(s)	Result	Ref.
2022	Danish Music Awards	Danish Producer of the Year	Westerlin	Nominated	
2023	Danish Music Awards	Danish Producer of the Year	Westerlin, Martin René and Alibi Rafeon (for D1MA's album, Ev1gt&alt1d)	Won	
2023	Danish Music Awards	Danish Producer of the Year	Westerlin, Frederik Thaae and Adam Hillebrandt (for Artigeardit's album, Længe Leve)	Nominated	
2024	Danish Music Awards	Danish Producer of the Year	Westerlin (for Lamin's albums, SkyLL and De her timer)	Won	
2025	P3 Guld	P3 Talent	Westerlin	Nominated	
2026	GAFFA Awards	Producer of the Year	Westerlin	Won	
