= Tobias Rahim discography =

- Studio albums: 3
- EPs: 3
- Singles: 37
- Guest appearances: 2

Danish singer and songwriter Tobias Rahim has released, as a solo artist, three studio albums, two extended plays, 37 singles, and has featured on an additional two songs. Under the pseudonym Grande, as part of the reggaeton duo Camilo & Grande, he also released one extended play and four singles.

As part of Camilo & Grande, the duo released their first single in 2012, entitled "Go'e vibes". They released an additional two songs in 2013, before releasing "Røgsignaler" in 2014. Featuring Klumben, the song would be part of the duo's only extended play, Eufori, which released on 1 June 2015.

Rahim released his debut single "Falder i" in December 2016, followed by two more. The three tracks would later be a part of his self-titled debut extended play, released in April 2017. The EP was Rahim's only release under the disco:wax label. As a solo artist, Rahim did not release any music again until 2019, releasing the single "Op a væggen". The song would later go on to achieve platinum certificiation from IFPI Danmark. In 2020, now under the Sony Music Denmark label, Rahim released his debut studio album, National Romantik 2021. The album became Rahim's first to break into the Hitlisten charts, Denmark's top 40 charts. The album peaked at number 16, and later achieved platinum certification.

Rahim's first single of 2021, "Stimulanser", released on 12 February. The song featured Ida Laurberg and reached gold certification. In August, Rahim released "Stor mand" featuring Andreas Odbjerg. The song gained favourable reviews from music critics and became one of Denmark's biggest hits for 2021. The song held the number-one position on the Hitlisten charts for a total of 15 weeks, and finished as number eight on the top songs of the year on the Hitlisten charts. The song went platinum nine-times in Denmark as the lead single for Rahim's sophomore album, Når sjælen kaster op, released in October 2022. The album was seen as a success as it went on to achieve platinum seven times, with 10 songs from the album in total reaching the Hitlisten charts, six achieving certification from IFPI.

¿Happy Ending?, Rahim's second extended play, released one year after the success of Når sjælen kaster op. The extended play reached number seven on the charts, while "F'social angst" became the EP's only single to chart in Denmark. He released numerous singles in 2024, with songs featuring Danish rappers D1MA, Icekiid, and Omar. "Bellevue", featuring D1MA, became Rahim's first number-one song since 2022. It was followed up by "Dark Room", featuring Icekiid, which achieved number-one upon its release. In late 2025, Rahim released his most recent studio album, Vulkanø. The album was limited to a vinyl record release before being published to CD and music streaming services on 19 September 2025. The album received mixed reviews from critics, while still achieving number-one on the Hitlisten charts.

In 2026, Rahim released "Den danske sommer" with Birthe Kjær. The song, in its first appearance on the Hitlisten charts, became Rahim's seventh number-one single. His second single of 2026 came on 11 September when the song "Savner et menneske" was released by Norwegian rapper Marstein.

== Studio albums ==
Title	Details	Peak chart positions		Certifications
Title	Details	DEN	NOR	Certifications
National Romantik 2021	Released: 2 October 2020; Label: Sony Music; Format: CD, download	16	—	IFPI DEN: Platinum
Når sjælen kaster op	Released: 21 October 2022; Label: Sony Music; Format: LP, CD, download	1	—	IFPI DEN: 7× Platinum
Vulkanø	Released: 19 September 2025; Label: Sony Music; Format: LP, CD, download	1	97	IFPI DEN: Platinum
"—" denotes a recording that did not chart or was not released in that territory.

== Extended plays ==
=== with Camilo & Grande ===
Title	Details
Eufori	Release date: 1 June 2015; Label: disco:wax

=== Solo career ===
Title	Details	Peak chart positions
Title	Details	DEN
Tobias Rahim	Released: 7 April 2017; Label: disco:wax; Format: CD, download	—
¿Happy Ending?	Released: 6 October 2023; Label: Sony Music; Format: CD, download	7
"—" denotes a recording that did not chart or was not released in that territory.

== Singles ==
=== with Camilo & Grande ===
Title	Year	Album
"Go'e vibes"	2012	Non-album singles
"Gør dig lækker" (featuring Yerki)	2013	Non-album singles
"Sensuel"	2013	Non-album singles
"Røgsignaler" (featuring Klumben)	2014	Eufori

=== As lead artist ===
Title	Year	Peak chart positions	Certifications	Album
Title	Year	DEN	Certifications	Album
"Falder i"	2016	—		Tobias Rahim
"Gode tider"	2016	—		Tobias Rahim
"Luk mig op"	2016	—		Tobias Rahim
"Op a væggen"	2019	—	IFPI DEN: Platinum	Non-album single
"Jesus"	2020	—	IFPI DEN: Platinum	National Romantik 2021
"Stimulanser"; (featuring Ida Laurberg)	2021	—	IFPI DEN: Gold	Non-album single
"Stor mand" (featuring Andreas Odbjerg)	2021	1	IFPI DEN: 9× Platinum	Når sjælen kaster op
"Rose & torn (Floden i)"	2021	—		Non-album single
"Mucki Bar"	2022	1	IFPI DEN: 5× Platinum	Når sjælen kaster op
"Når mænd græder"	2022	6	IFPI DEN: Gold	Når sjælen kaster op
"Feberdrømmer xx Dubai"	2022	1	IFPI DEN: 4× Platinum	Når sjælen kaster op
"Bums for eliten" (featuring Artigeardit)	2022	25	IFPI DEN: Gold	Når sjælen kaster op
"Flyvende Faduma"	2022	1	IFPI DEN: 5× Platinum	Når sjælen kaster op
"Toget" (featuring Barcode Brothers)	2023	11		Non-album singles
"Orange"	2023	3	IFPI DEN: Platinum	Non-album singles
"Vi 1"	2023	2	IFPI DEN: 2× Platinum	Non-album singles
"Stor man" (featuring Victor Leksell)	2023	15		Non-album singles
"Benzin ild' glasskår"	2023	30		¿Happy Ending?
"Dødindeni"	2023	—		¿Happy Ending?
"F'social angst"	2023	13		¿Happy Ending?
"$$$ lykke"	2023	—		¿Happy Ending?
"Bellevue" (featuring D1MA)	2024	1	IFPI DEN: 3× Platinum	Vulkanø
"Dark Room" (featuring Icekiid)	2024	1	IFPI DEN: 2× Platinum	Vulkanø
"911" (with Omar)	2024	10	IFPI DEN: Platinum	Non-album single
"Jylland"	2024	9	IFPI DEN: Guld	Vulkanø
"Regntid" (featuring Kabusa Oriental Choir)	2025	19	IFPI DEN: Platinum	Vulkanø
"Lys (Illumineret)"	2025	28		Vulkanø
"Karavane (Lanigligfortældig)" (featuring Marwan)	2025	—		Vulkanø
"Tæt på" (featuring Delara)	2025	13	IFPI DEN: Platinum	Vulkanø
"Den værste" (featuring Lamin)	2025	24		Vulkanø
"Ingen ying uden yang" (featuring Mille)	2025	3	IFPI DEN: Platinum	Vulkanø
"Den danske sommer" (featuring Birthe Kjær)	2026	1	IFPI DEN: Gold	Non-album single
"Savner et menneske" (with Marstein)	2026	16		Yap.
"—" denotes a recording that did not chart or was not released in that territory.

=== As featured artist ===
Title	Year	Peak chart positions	Certifications	Album
Title	Year	DEN	Certifications	Album
"Burhan G" (Burhan G featuring KIDD and Rahim)	2021	13	IFPI DEN: Platinum	Non-album singles
"Heroin eller hvad" (USSEL featuring Rahim)	2026	—		Non-album singles
"—" denotes a recording that did not chart or was not released in that territory.

== Other charted songs ==
Title	Year	Peak chart positions	Certifications	Album
Title	Year	DEN	Certifications	Album
"07 i 6a"	2022	18		Når sjælen kaster op
"Makeup"	2022	21		Når sjælen kaster op
"Alene på staden"	2022	23		Når sjælen kaster op
"Taber mig i dig. Føler vi ku vinde"	2022	30		Når sjælen kaster op
"Elsker når du smiler"	2025	7	IFPI DEN: Gold	Vulkanø
