= List of best-selling singles by country =

The following is an independently-determined list of best-selling singles by country. Depends on the measurement, record sales of songs are taken by estimations or certifications. The singles listed here were cited by various media, such as digital journalism, newspapers, magazines, and books.

Note that tables are incomplete due to a lack of available published data from a number of territories, unlike the United Kingdom and the United States with recognized national measurement firms and certifying bodies such as Official Charts Company/British Phonographic Industry (BPI) and Nielsen SoundScan/Recording Industry Association of America (RIAA) respectively. Therefore, it is not an exhaustive list, so no rankings are given in certain cases.

== Argentina ==
Year	Artist	Title	Sales	Origin
1964	Leonardo Favio	"Fuiste Mia Un Verano"	1,500,000	Claimed sales
1979	ABBA	"Chiquitita"	700,000	Claimed sales
	Rosamel Araya	"Quemame Los Ojos"	600,000	Claimed sales
1973	Formula V	"Eva Maria"	450,000	Claimed sales
1978	Daniel Magal	"Cara De Gitana"	400,000	Claimed sales
1971	Heleno	"La Chica de la Boutique"	400,000	Claimed sales
1958	Billy Cafaro	"Pity, Pity"	300,000	Claimed sales
1961	Antonio Prieto	"La Novia"	300,000	Claimed sales
1967	Los Gatos	"La balsa"	250,000	Claimed sales
1977	Laurent Voulzy	"Rockollection"	200,000	Claimed sales
1985	Isabel Pantoja	"Marinero de Luces"	200,000	Claimed sales
1980	Lucrecia	"Papucho Mio"	180,000	Claimed sales
1969	La Joven Guardia	"El extraño del pelo largo"	150,000	Claimed sales
1966	Yaco Monti	"Siempre te Recordare"	140,000	Claimed sales
1979	Barbra Streisand & Donna Summer	"No More Tears (Enough Is Enough)"	125,000	Claimed sales
1973	Heleno	"No son palabritas"	125,000	Claimed sales
1978	Los Campeones	"Vamos, Vamos Argentina"	120,000	Claimed sales
1958	Dione Restrepo	"Delito"	100,000	Claimed sales
c. 1968	Matt Monro	"Alguien Cantó" (The Music Played)	100,000	Claimed sales
1977	Bonnie Tyler	"It's a Heartache"	100,000	Claimed sales

Notes

- The best-selling single in Argentina is also the best-selling record, attributed to either Leonardo Favio's "Fuiste Mia Un Verano" (1968) or El rancho'e la Cambicha (1950) for estimations as high as 1.5 and 5 million sold in the country respectively, by various national publications.

== Austria ==
Year	Artist	Title	Sales	Origin
1997	Elton John	"Candle in the Wind 1997"	300,000	Certification
2019	Tones and I	"Dance Monkey"	210,000^{‡}	Certification
1999	Anton & DJ Ötzi	"Anton aus Tirol"	150,000	Certification
2021	Ed Sheeran	"Bad Habits"	150,000^{‡}	Certification
2020	Glass Animals	"Heat Waves"	150,000^{‡}	Certification
2019	Apache 207	"Roller"	120,000^{‡}	Certification
2019	Billie Eilish	"Bad Guy"	120,000^{‡}	Certification
2013	Helene Fischer	"Atemlos durch die Nacht"	120,000^{‡}	Certification

== Cameroon ==
Year	Artist	Single	Sales	Origin
	Ekambi Brillant	"Jonguèlè la Ndolo"	20,000	Claimed sales

== Chile ==
Year	Artist	Title	Sales	Origin
1963	Luis Dimas	"Me recordarás"	100,000	Claimed sales
1963	Luis Dimas	"Caprichito"	100,000	Claimed sales
1962	Los Ramblers	"El rock del Mundial"	80,000	Claimed sales
1979	ABBA	"Chiquitita"	75,000	Claimed sales
1993	Carlos Vives	"La gota fría"	25,000	Platinum certification
2001	Chocolate	"Mayonesa"	21,000	Claimed sales

== Colombia ==
Year	Artist	Title	Sales	Origin
1979	Darío Gómez	"Ángel Perdido"	600,000	Claimed sales
1993	Los del Río	"Macarena"	500,000	Claimed sales
1989	Kaoma	"Lambada"	500,000	Claimed sales
1994	Margarita Rosa de Francisco	"Gaviota"	500,000	Claimed sales
1983	Calixto Ochoa	"El Africano"	250,000	Claimed sales
1981	José Luis Perales	"¿Y cómo es él?"	200,000	Claimed sales
1994	Diomedes Díaz	"Yo soy Mundial"	150,000	Claimed sales

== Cuba ==
Year	Artist	Title	Sales	Origin
1928	Trio Matamoros	"Él que siembra su maíz"	64,000	Claimed sales
1956	Elvis Presley	"Don't Be Cruel"	50,000	Claimed sales
1956	Bill Haley & His Comets	"See You Later, Alligator"	12,000	Claimed sales

Notes

- According to some estimates, "Miénteme" (1954) by Olga Guillot sold one million copies in Cuba, although figures lack of verified data.

== Denmark ==
Year	Artist	Title	Sales	Origin
1960	Grethe Sønck	"Klaus Jorgen"	80,000	Claimed sales
1970	Mungo Jerry	"In the Summertime"	55,000	Claimed sales
1961	Anita Lindblom	"San't Ar Livet"	50,000	Claimed sales
1960	Otto Brandeburg	"What Do you Want To Make Those Eyes At Me For"	50,000	Claimed sales
1966	Rocking Ghosts	"Oh What a Kiss"	50,000	Claimed sales
1967	The Beatles	"Hello, Goodbye"	50,000	Claimed sales
1961	The Four Jacks	"Oh! Marie Jeg Vil Hjem"	50,000	Claimed sales
1978	Lone Kellermann	"Luigi"	35,000	Claimed sales
2006	Basshunter	"Boten Anna"	27,000	Claimed sales
1970	Danyel Gérard	"Butterfly"	26,000	Claimed sales

Highest certified singles in Denmark^{‡}
Year	Artist	Title	Certifications	Certified sales
2017	Ed Sheeran	"Shape of You"	9× Platinum	810,000
2021	Tobias Rahim ft. Andreas Odbjerg	"Stor mand"	9× Platinum	810,000
2015	Lukas Graham	"7 Years"	8× Platinum	720,000
2017	Ed Sheeran	"Perfect"	8× Platinum	720,000
1985	Wham!	"Last Christmas"	7× Platinum	630,000
1994	Mariah Carey	"All I Want for Christmas Is You"	7× Platinum	630,000
2012	Passenger	"Let Her Go"	7× Platinum	630,000
2014	Ed Sheeran	"Thinking Out Loud"	7× Platinum	630,000
2015	Justin Bieber	"Love Yourself"	7× Platinum	630,000
2016	Volbeat	"For Evigt"	7× Platinum	630,000
2017	Luis Fonsi & Daddy Yankee ft. Justin Bieber	"Despacito" remix	7× Platinum	630,000
2018	Lewis Capaldi	"Someone You Loved"	7× Platinum	630,000
2019	The Weeknd	"Blinding Lights"	7× Platinum	630,000
2013	Rasmus Seebach	"Øde ø"	6× Platinum	540,000
2013	John Legend	"All Of Me"	6× Platinum	540,000
2016	Drake feat. Wizkid & Kyla	"One Dance"	6× Platinum	540,000
2019	Suspekt	"Gonzo"	6× Platinum	540,000
2021	Kesi feat. Hans Philip	"Blå Himmel"	6× Platinum	540,000
1984	Rocazino	"All My Love"	5× Platinum	450,000
2011	Rasmus Seebach	"Under Stjernerne På Himlen"	5× Platinum	450,000
2012	Tom Odell	"Another Love"	5× Platinum	450,000
2012	Frank Ocean	"Lost"	5× Platinum	450,000
2013	Calum Scott	"Dancing on My Own"	5× Platinum	450,000
2013	Mads Langer	"I En Stjerneregn Af Sne"	5× Platinum	450,000
2013	Hozier	"Take Me to Church"	5× Platinum	450,000
2014	Sam Smith	"Stay with Me"	5× Platinum	450,000
2015	Major Lazer, MØ & DJ Snake	"Lean On"	5× Platinum	450,000
2015	Shawn Mendes	"Stitches"	5× Platinum	450,000
2015	Zara Larsson	"Lush Life"	5× Platinum	450,000
2015	Justin Bieber	"What Do You Mean?"	5× Platinum	450,000
2015	Justin Bieber	"Sorry"	5× Platinum	450,000
2016	Phlake	"Angel Zoo"	5× Platinum	450,000
2016	Billie Eilish	"Ocean Eyes"	5× Platinum	450,000
2016	Justin Timberlake	"Can't Stop the Feeling!"	5× Platinum	450,000
2016	James Arthur	"Say You Won't Let Go"	5× Platinum	450,000
2018	The Minds of 99	"Alle Skuffer Over Tid"	5× Platinum	450,000
2018	Dean Lewis	"Be Alright"	5× Platinum	450,000
2018	Lukas Graham	"Love Someone"	5× Platinum	450,000
2018	Lady Gaga & Bradley Cooper	"Shallow"	5× Platinum	450,000
2019	Tones and I	"Dance Monkey"	5× Platinum	450,000
2019	Gilli	"Vai Amor"	5× Platinum	450,000
2020	The Weeknd	"Save Your Tears"	5× Platinum	450,000
2021	Ed Sheeran	"Bad Habits"	5× Platinum	450,000
2021	The Minds of 99	"Under Din Sne"	5× Platinum	450,000
2021	Benny Jamz, Gilli, Kesi feat. B.O.C	"Ibiza"	5× Platinum	450,000
2022	Tobias Rahim	"Flyvende Faduma"	5× Platinum	450,000
2022	Tobias Rahim	"Mucki bar"	5× Platinum	450,000

== Ecuador ==
Year	Artist	Title	Sales	Origin
1979	Darwin	"Yo esperaré, Tú cambiarás"	350,000 - 150,000	Claimed sales
1979	ABBA	"Chiquitita"	75,000	Claimed sales
1972	Héctor Jaramillo	"El pañuelo blanco"	30,000	Claimed sales

Notes

- "Fatalidad" (1956 release, 1944 original recording) by Julio Jaramillo is according to some national newspapers, the biggest Ecuatorian single, selling between 6,000 and 8,000 copies in its first-week alone.

== Egypt ==
Year	Artist	Title	Sales	Origin
1964	Umm Kulthum	"Inta Omri"	300,000	Claimed sales
1966	Umm Kulthum	"Al-Atlal"	200,000	Claimed sales

== El Salvador ==
Year	Artist	Title	Sales	Origin
1979	ABBA	"Chiquitita"	65,000	Claimed sales

== Ghana ==
Year	Artist	Title	Sales	Origin
1998	Reggie Rockstone	"Plan Ben? (What Plan?)"	50,000	Claimed sales

== Greece ==
Year	Artist	Title	Sales	Origin
1966	Olympians	"O Tropos"	150,000	Claimed sales
1988	Christos Dantis	"Belly Dance"	100,000	Claimed sales
1969	Dionysis Savvopoulos	"Dirlada"	60,000	Claimed sales

== India ==
Year	Artist	Title	Sales	Origin
2010	Shakira	"Waka Waka (This Time for Africa)"	300,000	Claimed sales

== Indonesia ==
Year	Artist	Single	Sales	Origin
1990	Timmy Thomas	"(Dying Inside) To Hold You"	30,000	Claimed sales

== Ireland ==
Year	Artist	Title	Sales	Origin
1977	Gloria	"One Day at a Time"	120,000	Claimed sales
2021	Olivia Rodrigo	"Drivers License"	111,000^{‡}	OCC report 2021
1985	Paddy Reilly	"The Fields of Athenry"	100,000	Claimed sales
2017	Dua Lipa	"New Rules"	100,000^{‡}	OCC report 2018
1995	Bill Whelan	"Riverdance"	90,000	Claimed sales
2017	Dua Lipa	"IDGAF"	84,500^{‡}	OCC report 2018
2022	Harry Styles	"As It Was"	78,000^{‡}	OCC report 2022
1977	Paul McCartney and Wings	"Mull of Kintyre"	65,000	Claimed sales
1978	Boney M	"Rivers of Babylon"	54,000	Claimed sales
1979	ABBA	"Chiquitita"	50,000	Claimed sales
1976	ABBA	"Dancing Queen"	50,000	Claimed sales
1976	ABBA	"Fernando"	50,000	Claimed sales
1975	ABBA	"Waterloo"	50,000	Claimed sales
1972	Dr. Hook & the Medicine Show	"Sylvia's Mother"	50,000	Claimed sales

Highest selling singles according to IRMA up to 2012
Ranking	Year	Artist	Title
1	1997	Elton John	"Candle in the Wind 1997"
2	1995	Bill Whelan	"Riverdance"
3	2002	Six	"There's a Whole Lot of Loving"
4	2010	Matt Cardle	"When We Collide"
5	2000	Mark McCabe	"Maniac 2000"
6	2006	Eiffel 65	"Blue (Da Ba Dee)"
7	2002	Enrique Iglesias	"Hero"
8	2006	Mundy & Sharon Shannon	"Galway Girl"
9	2009	Black Eyed Peas	"I Gotta Feeling"
10	2001	Westlife	"Uptown Girl"
11	2002	Eminem	"Lose Yourself"
12	2000	Shaggy	"It Wasn't Me"
13	1998	Celine Dion	"My Heart Will Go On"
14	2008	Alexandra Burke	"Hallelujah"
15	1996	Richie Kavanagh	"Aon Focal Eile"
16	2000	Eminem	"Stan"
17	2004	Band Aid 20	"Do They Know It's Christmas?"
18	2002	Las Ketchup	"Aserejé"
19	1998	Goo Goo Dolls	"Iris"
20	2001	Shaggy	"Angel"

== Jamaica ==
Year	Artist	Title	Sales	Origin
1964	Bob Marley and the Wailers	"Simmer Down"	70,000	Claimed sales
1960	Higgs and Wilson	"Oh Manny Oh"	30,000	Claimed sales
1970	Bob Marley and the Wailers	"Mr. Brown"	15,000	Claimed sales

- "Legalize It" is "one of Jamaica's top-selling singles".

== Kenya ==
Year	Artist	Title	Sales	Origin
1982	George Mukabi	"Sengula Nakupenda"	100,000	Claimed sales

== Lebanon ==
Year	Artist	Title	Sales	Origin
1960	Bob Azzam	"Ya Mustafa"	40,000	Claimed sales
1958	Dalida	"Histoire d'un amour"	23,000	Claimed sales
1959	Dalida	"Luna Caprese"	17,000	Claimed sales
1959	Domenico Modugno	"Piove (Ciao, ciao bambina)"	12,000	Claimed sales
1957	Paul Anka	"Diana"	8,000	Claimed sales
1958	Domenico Modugno	"Volare"	7,000	Claimed sales
1966	Nicole Croisille & Pierre Barouh	"Un homme et une femme"	5,000	Claimed sales
1959	Fred Buscaglione	"Guarda Che Luna"	4,000	Claimed sales

== Luxembourg ==
Park Café sold 5,000 copies of a maxi-single recorded in 1986. Up to 1993, average sales records were between 1,000 and 2,000 units, according to local retailers and mechanical licensing reports from SACEM.

== Malaysia ==
Year	Artist	Single	Sales	Origin
1989	Kaoma	"Lambada"	80,000	Claimed sales
1986	Ramli Sarip	"Oran Kota (City People)"	50,000	Claimed sales
1989	Tommy Page	"A Shoulder to Cry On"	30,000	Claimed sales
1990	Timmy Thomas	"(Dying Inside) To Hold You"	20,000	Claimed sales

== Malta ==
Year	Artist	Title	Sales	Origin
	Fredu Abela (il-Bamboċċu)	"Taxi Mary"	10,000	Claimed sales

Notes

- "Taxi Mary" by Fredu Abela (il-Bamboċċu) is considered to be Malta's highest selling record/single of all time. "Do They Know It's Christmas?" by Band Aid, sold "Hundreds of copies" in its first eight days.
- Additional information: According to a 1968 report, about 60,000 records were sold annually in Malta up that point, with 70% covered by singles, and three quarters of the records were of American or British origins. The remainder were principally Italian.

== Morocco ==
Year	Artist	Title	Sales	Origin
	Najat Aatabou	"J'en ai marre"	500,000	Claimed sales

== New Zealand ==
Year	Artist	Title	Certifications	Sales	Origin
1977	Fleetwood Mac	"Dreams"	20× Platinum	600,000^{‡}	Certifications
2019	L.A.B.	"In the Air"	16× Platinum	480,000^{‡}	Certifications
2017	Ed Sheeran	"Shape of You"	14× Platinum	420,000^{‡}	Certifications
2017	Ed Sheeran	"Perfect"	14× Platinum	420,000^{‡}	Certifications
2003	The Killers	"Mr. Brightside"	13× Platinum	390,000^{‡}	Certifications
1977	Eagles	"Hotel California"	12× Platinum	360,000^{‡}	Certifications
2011	Six60	"Don't Forget Your Roots"	12× Platinum	360,000^{‡}	Certifications
2013	Vance Joy	"Riptide"	12× Platinum	360,000^{‡}	Certifications
2014	J Cole	"No Role Modelz"	12× Platinum	360,000^{‡}	Certifications
2017	Ed Sheeran	"Thinking Out Loud"	12× Platinum	360,000^{‡}	Certifications
2018	Post Malone & Swae Lee	"Sunflower"	12× Platinum	360,000^{‡}	Certifications
2018	Lewis Capaldi	"Someone You Loved"	12× Platinum	360,000^{‡}	Certifications
1976	Fleetwood Mac	"Go Your Own Way"	11× Platinum	330,000^{‡}	Certifications
1981	Journey	"Don't Stop Believin'"	11× Platinum	330,000^{‡}	Certifications
1982	Toto	"Africa"	11× Platinum	330,000^{‡}	Certifications
2008	Kings of Leon	"Sex on Fire"	11× Platinum	330,000^{‡}	Certifications
2013	Hozier	"Take Me to Church"	11× Platinum	330,000^{‡}	Certifications
2015	Chris Stapleton	"Tennessee Whiskey"	11× Platinum	330,000^{‡}	Certifications
2016	Drake feat. Wizkid & Kyla	"One Dance"	11× Platinum	330,000^{‡}	Certifications
2017	Kendrick Lamar	"Humble"	11× Platinum	330,000^{‡}	Certifications
1970	Creedence Clearwater Revival	"Have You Ever Seen the Rain"	10× Platinum	300,000^{‡}	Certifications
1977	Fleetwood Mac	"The Chain"	10× Platinum	300,000^{‡}	Certifications
1998	Goo Goo Dolls	"Iris"	10× Platinum	300,000^{‡}	Certifications
2010	Miguel	"Sure Thing"	10× Platinum	300,000^{‡}	Certifications
2011	Macklemore & Ryan Lewis feat. Ray Dalton	"Can't Hold Us"	10× Platinum	300,000^{‡}	Certifications
2012	Frank Ocean	"Lost"	10× Platinum	300,000^{‡}	Certifications
2014	Mark Ronson feat. Bruno Mars	"Uptown Funk"	10× Platinum	300,000^{‡}	Certifications
2016	The Chainsmokers & Halsey	"Closer"	10× Platinum	300,000^{‡}	Certifications
2016	James Arthur	"Say You Won't Let Go"	10× Platinum	300,000^{‡}	Certifications
2018	Lady Gaga & Bradley Cooper	"Shallow"	10× Platinum	300,000^{‡}	Certifications
2018	L.A.B.	"Controller"	10× Platinum	300,000^{‡}	Certifications
2019	The Weeknd	"Blinding Lights"	10× Platinum	300,000^{‡}	Certifications
2019	Tones and I	"Dance Monkey"	10× Platinum	300,000^{‡}	Certifications
2020	Glass Animals	"Heat Waves"	10× Platinum	300,000^{‡}	Certifications
2020	Dua Lipa	"Levitating"	10× Platinum	300,000^{‡}	Certifications
2021	Elton John & Dua Lipa	"Cold Heart (Pnau remix)"	10× Platinum	300,000^{‡}	Certifications
2023	Teddy Swims	"Lose Control "	10× Platinum	300,000^{‡}	Certifications

== Nigeria ==
Year	Artist	Title	Sales	Origin
1976	Prince Nico Mbarga	"Sweet Mother"	500,000	Claimed sales
1969	Sonny Okosun	"Joromi"	100,000	Claimed sales
1976	Sonny Okosun	"Help"	100,000	Claimed sales

=== Top certified singles ===
According to TurnTable charts
Year	Artist	Title	Certifications	Certified sales
2023	Asake	"Lonely at the Top"	8× Platinum	800,000^{‡}
2022	Asake	"Terminator"	7× Platinum	700,000^{‡}
2022	Fireboy DML & Asake	"Bandana"	7× Platinum	700,000^{‡}
2022	Omah Lay	"Soso"	6× Platinum	600,000^{‡}
2024	Asake & Wizkid	"MMS"	6× Platinum	600,000^{‡}
2024	Fido	"Joy Is Coming"	6× Platinum	600,000^{‡}
2023	Seyi Vibez	"Cana"	6× Platinum	600,000^{‡}

== Norway ==
Year	Artist	Title	Sales	Origin
1977	Baccara	"Yes Sir, I Can Boogie"	300,000	Claimed sales
1997	Elton John	"Candle in the Wind 1997"	182,000	Claimed sales
1964	Jim Reeves	"I Love You Because"	100,000	Claimed sales (Diamond certification)
2003	Kurt Nilsen	"She's So High"	100,000	Claimed sales
1968	Anna-Lena Löfgren	"Lyckliga Gatan"	75,000	Claimed sales

Highest certified singles in Norway (as of 2023)
Year	Artist	Title	Certified sales	Amount
2017	Luis Fonsi and Daddy Yankee ft. Justin Bieber	"Despacito"	720,000^{‡}	12× Platinum
2013	Miley Cyrus	"Wrecking Ball"	660,000^{‡}	11× Platinum
2018	Ava Max	"Sweet but Psycho"	540,000^{‡}	11× Platinum
2013	Katy Perry	"Roar"	480,000^{‡}	8× Platinum
2009	Lady Gaga	"Bad Romance"	480,000^{‡}	8× Platinum
2018	Lady Gaga & Bradley Cooper	"Shallow"	480,000^{‡}	8× Platinum
2019	The Weeknd	"Blinding Lights"	480,000^{‡}	8× Platinum
2015	Alan Walker	"Faded"	440,000^{‡}	11× Platinum
2017	Kygo & Selena Gomez	"It Ain't Me"	420,000^{‡}	7× Platinum
2013	Miley Cyrus	"We Can't Stop"	420,000^{‡}	7× Platinum
2018	Dean Lewis	"Be Alright"	360,000^{‡}	6× Platinum
2016	Freddy Kalas	"Jovial"	320,000^{‡}	8× Platinum
2017	Astrid S	"Think Before I Talk"	300,000^{‡}	5× Platinum
2017	Hkeem & Temur	"Fy Faen"	300,000^{‡}	5× Platinum
2015	Justin Bieber	"Love Yourself"	300,000^{‡}	5× Platinum
2015	Justin Bieber	"Sorry"	300,000^{‡}	5× Platinum
2013	Katy Perry	"Dark Horse"	300,000^{‡}	5× Platinum
2015	Marcus & Martinus	"Elektrisk"	300,000^{‡}	5× Platinum
2012	Loreen	"Euphoria"	110,000	11× Platinum

Notes

- Until 1965, the average of copies sold of singles in Norway, with a population of 3.5 million, was between 1,500 and 2,000 copies. In comparison, "I Love You Because" of Jim Reeves sold up that point 100,000 copies, which was considered a "tremendous amount" and became the highest-selling record in the country at that time.

== Philippines ==
Year	Artist	Title	Sales	Origin
1978	Freddie Aguilar	"Anak"	400,000	Claimed sales
1978	Columbia Orchestra (Mitsuko Horie / Ichiro Mizuki)	"Voltes V Song / I Want Father" (Voltes V no Uta / Chichi wo Motomete)	400,000	Claimed sales
1976	Donna Summer	"Could It Be Magic / Come With Me"	120,000	Claimed sales
1979	The Sugarhill Gang	"Rapper's Delight"	100,000	Claimed sales
1976	Donna Summer	"Try Me, I Know We Can Make It / Wasted"	60,000	Claimed sales

== Poland ==
Highest certified singles in Poland^{‡} (as of 2023)
Year	Artist	Title	Certified sales
2017	Ed Sheeran	"Shape of You"	1,250,000
2017	Ed Sheeran	"Perfect"	1,000,000
2019	Tones and I	"Dance Monkey"	1,000,000

== Portugal ==
Year	Artist	Title	Sales	Origin
2000	Coldplay	"Yellow"	200,000	Certification^{‡}
1977	Paulo Alexandre	"Verde Vinho"	200,000	Claimed sales
1985	USA for Africa	"We Are the World"	200,000	Claimed sales
1984	Stevie Wonder	"I Just Called to Say I Love You"	170,000	Claimed sales
1975	Queen	"Bohemian Rhapsody"	160,000	Certification^{‡}
2002	Eminem	"Lose Yourself"	120,000	Certification^{‡}
1988	Guns N' Roses	"Sweet Child o' Mine"	120,000	Certification^{‡}
1991	Nirvana	"Smells Like Teen Spirit"	120,000	Certification^{‡}
1992	Radiohead	"Creep"	120,000	Certification^{‡}
2019	The Weeknd	"Blinding Lights"	100,000	Certification^{‡}
1975	ABBA	"Fernando"	80,000	Claimed sales
1995	Coolio	"Gangsta's Paradise"	80,000	Certification^{‡}
2013	John Legend	"All Of Me"	80,000	Certification^{‡}
1989	Kaoma	"Lambada"	80,000	Certification
2012	Tom Odell	"Another Love"	80,000	Certification^{‡}

== Romania ==
=== Top selling singles ===
Year	Artist	Title	Sales	Origin
2003	O-Zone	"Dragostea din tei"	250,000	Sales

== Russia ==
=== Top certified singles ===
Year	Artist	Title	Certifications	Sales	Origin
	George Frideric Handel	"Water Music. Air"	17× Platinum	3,500,000	Certifications
2007	Morandi	"Angels"	7× Platinum	1,400,000	Certifications
2010	Arash ft. Helena	"Broken Angel"	4× Platinum	800,000	Certifications
2010	Lady Gaga	"Alejandro"	4× Platinum	800,000	Certifications
2010	Tony Igy	"Astronomia"	4× Platinum	800,000	Certifications
2011	Джиган feat Юля Савичева	"Отпусти "	3× Platinum	600,000	Certifications
2010	Alexandra Stan	"Mr. Saxobeat"	3× Platinum	600,000	Certifications
2010	Eminem ft. Rihanna	"Love the Way You Lie"	3× Platinum	600,000	Certifications
2007	Enrique Iglesias	"Tired of Being Sorry"	3× Platinum	600,000	Certifications
2009	Stromae	"Alors on danse"	3× Platinum	600,000	Certifications
2010	Слава	"Одиночество"	3× Platinum	600,000	Certifications
2010	140 ударов в минуту	"У меня есть ты Remix 2010 "	3× Platinum	600,000	Certifications

Notes

- By September 2000, "Solo" by Alsou was considered to be the best-selling single ever in Russia, according to Billboard, selling at least 60,000 units in four weeks.

== Scotland ==
Year	Artist	Title	Sales	Origin
1977	Andy Cameron	"Ally's Tartan Army"	150,000	Claimed sales

== Singapore ==
Year	Artist	Single	Sales	Origin
1986	Various	"Count On Me Singapore"	73,000	Claimed sales
1990	Timmy Thomas	"(Dying Inside) To Hold You"	54,000	Claimed sales
	Naomi and The Boys	"Happy, Happy Birthday Baby"	50,000	Claimed sales
1985	Tokyo Square	"Within You'll Remain"	30,000	Claimed sales
1987	Pet Shop Boys	"Always on My Mind"	20,000	Claimed sales

== South Africa ==
Year	Artist	Title	Sales	Origin
1995	Arthur Mafokate	"Kaffir"	300,000	Claimed sales
2019	Elaine	"You're the One"	210,000	Claimed sales
1967	Anita Harris	"Just Loving You"	200,000	Claimed sales
1962	Jeremy Taylor	"Ag Pleez Deddy"	140,000	Claimed sales
1971	Creedence Clearwater Revival	"Have You Ever Seen the Rain?"	100,000	Claimed sales
1939	Solomon Linda	"The Lion Sleeps Tonight" (aka "Mbube")	100,000	Claimed sales

== Sweden ==
Year	Artist	Title	Sales	Origin
1973	ABBA	"Ring Ring"	175,000	Claimed sales
1958	Little Gerhard	"Buona Sera"	158,000	Claimed sales
1977	ABBA	"The Name of the Game"	140,000	Claimed sales
2002	Las Ketchup	"The Ketchup Song (Aserejé)"	130,000	Claimed sales
1968	Anna-Lena Löfgren	"Lyckliga Gatan"	125,000	Claimed sales
1976	Barbi Benton	"Ain't That Just The Way"	115,000	Claimed sales
1959	Lill-Babs	"Klas-Göran"	112,000	Claimed sales
1962	Anna-Lena Löfgren	"Regniga natt"	100,000	Claimed sales
1977	Baccara	"Yes Sir, I Can Boogie"	100,000	Claimed sales
1968	Claes-Göran Hederström	"Good Grief"	100,000	Claimed sales
1960	Elvis Presley	"It's Now or Never"	100,000	Claimed sales
1978	Jan Lindblad	"Shenandoah"	100,000	Claimed sales
1970	Mungo Jerry	"In the Summertime"	100,000	Claimed sales
1966	Sven Ingvars	"Kristina Fran Vilhelmina"	100,000	Claimed sales

Highest certified singles in Sweden^{‡} (as of 2023)
Year	Artist	Title	Certified sales	Amount
2013	Avicii	"Wake Me Up"	520,000	13× Platinum
2015	Alan Walker	"Faded"	520,000	13× Platinum
2017	Luis Fonsi	"Despacito (remix)"	440,000	8× Platinum
2010	Shakira ft. Freshlyground	"Waka Waka (This Time for Africa)"	420,000	Combined sales (Note: 9× Platinum + 3× Platinum (ringtone))
2015	Zara Larsson	"Lush Life"	400,000	10× Platinum
2017	Ed Sheeran	"Shape of You"	360,000	9× Platinum
2013	Hozier	"Take Me to Church"	360,000	9× Platinum
2015	Ellie Goulding	"Love Me like You Do"	360,000	9× Platinum
2015	Justin Bieber	"Love Yourself"	360,000	9× Platinum
2012	Loreen	"Euphoria"	360,000	9× Platinum
2013	John Legend	"All of Me"	330,000	11× Platinum
2011	Avicii	"Levels"	320,000	11× Platinum
2015	Mike Posner	"I Took a Pill in Ibiza"	320,000	11× Platinum

== Switzerland ==
Year	Artist	Title	Sales	Origin
	Kilby & Caroline	"Lach Mit"	265,000	Claimed sales
1970	Die Minstrels	"Gruezi Wohl, Frau Stirnimaa"	200,000	Claimed sales
1978	Boney M	"Rivers of Babylon"	128,000	Claimed sales

Highest certified singles in Switzerland
Year	Artist	Title	Certified sales	Amount
1997	Elton John	"Candle in the Wind 1997"	450,000	9× Platinum
2005	Eminem	"Mockingbird"	240,000^{‡}	6× Platinum
2017	Ed Sheeran	"Shape of You"	180,000^{‡}	9× Platinum
2008	Michel Teló	"Ai se eu te pego!"	180,000^{‡}	6× Platinum
2015	Alan Walker	"Faded"	150,000^{‡}	5× Platinum
2012	Lana Del Rey	"Summertime Sadness"	150,000^{‡}	5× Platinum
2016	Rag'n'Bone Man	"Human"	150,000^{‡}	5× Platinum
2017	Camila Cabello	"Havana"	140,000^{‡}	7× Platinum
2021	Farruko	"Pepas"	140,000^{‡}	7× Platinum
2009	Akon	"Sexy Bitch"	120,000	4× Platinum
2017	Lo & Leduc	"079"	120,000^{‡}	6× Platinum
2017	Ed Sheeran	"Perfect"	120,000^{‡}	6× Platinum
2011	DJ Antoine	"Ma Chérie"	120,000	4× Platinum
2020	Glass Animals	"Heat Waves"	120,000^{‡}	6× Platinum
2002	Las Ketchup	"The Ketchup Song (Aserejé)"	120,000	3× Platinum
1996	Andrea Bocelli	"Time to Say Goodbye"	100,000	2× Platinum
1997	Celine Dion	"My Heart Will Go On"	100,000	2× Platinum
1998	Eiffel 65	"Blue (Da Ba Dee)"	100,000	2× Platinum
1999	Lou Bega	"Mambo No. 5"	100,000	2× Platinum
1997	Puff Daddy	"I'll Be Missing You"	100,000	2× Platinum
1994	Züri West	"Ich schänke dr mis Härz"	100,000	2× Platinum

== Taiwan ==
Year	Artist	Title	Sales	Origin
1984	Yeh Chi-tien	"You'll Win Only If You Drive Yourself Hard"	700,000	Claimed sales
1988	Chao Chuan	"I'm Ugly, but I'm Tender"	200,000	Claimed sales

== Turkey ==
Year	Artist	Title	Sales	Origin
2001	Tarkan	"Kuzu Kuzu"	700,000	Claimed sales
2005	Tarkan	"Ayrılık Zor"	460,500	Mü-Yap year-end sales
2013	Gülşen	"Yatcaz Kalkcaz Ordayım"	131,631	Mü-Yap year-end sales

== USSR ==
Year	Artist	Title	Sales	Origin
1982	Alla Pugacheva	"Maestro"	2,600,000	Claimed sales
1982	Vladimir Vysotsky	"Yak The Fighter Plane"	1,800,000	Claimed sales

== Venezuela ==
Year	Artist	Title	Sales	Origin
1986	Ricardo Montaner	"Yo Te Amé"	250,000	Claimed sales
1970	Los Ángeles Negros	"Y Volveré"	114,510	Claimed sales
1985	Isabel Pantoja	"Marinero de Luces"	50,000	Claimed sales
	Jorge Rigó	"Sola"	50,000	Claimed sales

== Yugoslavia ==
Year	Artist	Title	Sales	Origin
1983	Danijel Popović	"Džuli"	800,000	Claimed sales
1982	Lepa Brena	"Mile voli disko"	800,000	Claimed sales
1983	Lepa Brena	Sitnije, Cile, sitnije	600,000	Claimed sales
1971	Mišo Kovač	"Proplakat će zora"	500,000	Claimed sales
1985	Neda Ukraden	Zora je	500,000	Claimed sales
1970	Meho Puzić	"O majko majko"	400,000	Claimed sales
1974	Danilo Živković	"Yugoslavia"	300,000	Claimed sales
1970	Silvana Armenulić	"Šta će mi život"	300,000	Claimed sales
1980	Zdravko Čolić	"Comrade Tito, We Take An Oath"	300,000	Claimed sales
1987	Oliver Dragojević	"Žuto Lišće Ljubavi"	200,000	Claimed sales
1968	Tom Jones	"Delilah"	200,000	Claimed sales
1969	Mišo Kovač	"Više Se Nećeš Vratiti"	183,987	Claimed sales
1974	Zdravko Čolić	"Ona Spava"	150,000	Claimed sales
1974	Boro Drljača	"Zauvek Poklon Taj"	131,072	Claimed sales
1969	Zvezda Ceklić-Ceca	"Poruka Roditeljima"	120,770	Claimed sales
1970	Tereza Kesovija	"Nono, moj dobri Nono"	123,700	Claimed sales
1971	Silvana Armenulić	"Otišao Si Bez Pozdrava"	110,657	Claimed sales
1974	ABBA	"Waterloo"	100,000	Claimed sales
1989	Alen Slavica	"Dao Sam Ti Dušu"	100,000	Claimed sales

== Zimbabwe ==
Year	Artist	Title	Sales	Origin
	Leonard Dembo	"Chiteketekeke"	100,000	Claimed sales
2001	Oliver Mtukudzi	"Bvuma-Tolerance"	100,000 (Note: Figure disputed.)	Claimed sales
1980	Solomon Skuza	"Banolila"	75,000	Claimed sales
1988	Khiama Boys	"Mabhauwa"	75,000	Claimed sales
	System Tazvida	"Mutunhu unemago"	30,000	Claimed sales

=== Rhodesia ===
Year	Artist	Title	Sales	Origin
1973	Gwynneth Ashley Robin	"Little Jimmy"	33,000	Gold disc certification
1974	The Green Arrows	"Chipo Chiroorwa"	25,000	Gold disc certification
c. 1978	Jon da Silva	Sermon (Note: 10-minute sermon.)	10,000 (Note: 26,000 copies in Rhodesia and abroad by early 1979.)	Gold disc certification

== See also ==
- List of best-selling singles
- List of best-selling albums by country
- List of best-selling sheet music

== Notes ==
- ^{‡}Certification include on-demand audio and video streams and track sale equivalent
