= 2022 in Nordic music =

The following is a list of notable events and releases that happened in Nordic music in 2022.

== Events ==
- 7 January – US-born Finnish violinist Elina Vähälä gives the first North American performance of the original 1904 version of Sibelius's Violin Concerto, with the Minnesota Orchestra under Finnish conductor Osmo Vänskä.
- 1 February
  - The Royal Danish Orchestra announces that Marie Jacquot will be its next music director, effective with the 2024-2025 season, with an initial contract of 5 years. She is the first female conductor ever appointed to the post.
  - The Norwegian National Opera and Ballet announces the appointment of Edward Gardner to the post of artistic advisor as its next music director.
- 19 February – In the final of Norway's Melodi Grand Prix 2022, the trio Subwoolfer is selected to represent Norway at the Eurovision Song Contest, with "Give That Wolf a Banana". They finish 10th in the Eurovision final.
- 5 March – Dansk Melodi Grand Prix 2022 is won by punk band Reddi with "The Show". It would be eliminated from the Eurovision Song Contest at the semi-final stage.
- 12 March – Melodifestivalen 2022 is won by Cornelia Jakobs with "Hold Me Closer"; at the Eurovision Song Contest 2022, it would finish fourth.
- 22 March – Ulf Dageby tours for the last time with the Nationalteatern orchestra.
- 5 April – It is announced that Santtu-Matias Rouvali will end his tenure as chief conductor of the Tampere Philharmonic Orchestra at the end of the 2022-2023 season.
- 12 April – Jukka-Pekka Saraste is appointed as the next chief conductor of the Helsinki Philharmonic Orchestra on a three-year contract effective with the 2023-2024 season.
- May – Guitarist Amen leaves Finnish band Lordi after disagreements with other band members.
- 3 May – Swedish doom metal band Draconian change their line-up, with the departure of singer Heike Langhans and the return of Lisa Johansson on vocals, as well as the addition of Niklas Nord on guitars.
- 27 May – The ABBA Voyage concert residency, with band members as virtual avatars, opens in London. The band make a personal appearance at the end of the first show.
- 29-30 July – The Uppsala Reggae Festival is scheduled to take place in Finland. Artists expected to appear include Max Romeo, Morgan Heritage and Gentleman.
- July – A version of Swedish band Ghost's 2019 song "Mary on a Cross" goes viral on TikTok. The band releases its own slowed-down version of the song, which tops the Billboard Hot Hard Rock streaming songs chart, and reaches the Hot 100 chart, their first such success.
- 20 September – The Tampere Philharmonic Orchestra announces that Matthew Halls will replace Santtu-Matias Rouvali as its chief conductor with an initial contract of 3 years.
- 3 November – Hannu Lintu is appointed chief conductor of the Gulbenkian Orchestra, effective with the 2023-2024 season.
- 30 November – Norway's Kristiansand Symphony Orchestra announces the appointment of Julian Rachlin as its next chief conductor, in succession to Nathalie Stutzmann.
- unknown date – The Reykjavík Recording Orchestra is founded, based at the Harpa concert hall in Reykjavík, Iceland.

== Albums released ==
=== January ===
| Day | Album | Artist | Label | Notes | Ref. |
|---|---|---|---|---|---|
| 14 | Live at Montreux Jazz Festival | Anna von Hausswolff | Southern Lord, Pomperipossa Records | | |
| 15 | Extreme | Molly Nilsson | Dark Skies Association, Night School | First album since 2018 | |
| 21 | Circus of Doom | Battle Beast | Nuclear Blast | | |
| 21 | Acoustic Adventures – Volume One | Sonata Arctica | Atomic Fire | First acoustic album | |
| 28 | Flames of Perdition | Dawn of Solace | Noble Demon | | |
| 28 | Chimes at Midnight | Madrugada | Warner | | |
| 28 | Motordrome | MØ | Columbia Records | | |
| 28 | Live, New, Borrowed, Blue | The Quill | | Compilation album | |

=== February ===
| Day | Album | Artist | Label | Notes | Ref. |
|---|---|---|---|---|---|
| 11 | Halo | Amorphis | Atomic Fire Records | | |
| 11 | The Long Road North | Cult of Luna | Metal Blade Records | Featuring guest artists Colin Stetson and Laurent Brancowitz | |
| 11 | Memoria | Trentemøller | In My Room | Featuring Lisbet Fritze | |
| 18 | Abyss Rising | Nightrage | Despotz Records | | |
| 25 | Hammer of Dawn | HammerFall | Napalm Records | 12th studio album | |
| 25 | Return to the Void | Shape of Despair | | | |
| 25 | Kumbl | Svartsot | Mighty Music Records | 15th anniversary album | |

=== March ===
| Day | Album | Artist | Label | Notes | Ref. |
|---|---|---|---|---|---|
| 4 | By Royal Decree | The Flower Kings | Inside Out Music | Double album | |
| 4 | Hjem fra fabrikken | Andreas Odbjerg | Universal Music Denmark | debut studio album, debuted at No. 1 on the Danish albums chart | |
| 4 | The War to End All Wars | Sabaton | Nuclear Blast Records | Concept album | |
| 11 | Impera | Ghost | Loma Vista/Concord | Including "Hunter's Moon", which features in the film Halloween Kills | |
| 11 | Gate of the Gods | New Horizon | Frontiers Music Srl | Erik Grönwall with Jona Tee | |
| 18 | Bigfoot TV | Ronni Le Tekrø | TBC Records via Cargo Records | First solo album for six years | |
| 18 | A Night at the Nordic House | Týr | Metal Blade | Live album, recorded February 2020 | |
| 25 | Turborider | Reckless Love | AFM Records | Postponed from February | |

=== April ===
| Day | Album | Artist | Label | Notes | Ref. |
|---|---|---|---|---|---|
| 1 | Avatars of Love | Sondre Lerche | Rough Trade | Double album; includes a duet with Aurora | |
| 1 | Shadowland | Wolf | Century Media | 9th studio album | |
| 8 | Isle of Wisdom | Hällas | Napalm Records | | |
| 15 | Ynglingaättens Öde | Månegarm | Napalm Records. | | |
| 15 | Paradise Again | Swedish House Mafia | Republic | Featuring 070 Shake, ASAP Rocky, Connie Constance, Jacob Mühlrad, Mapei, Seinabo Sey, Sting, Ty Dolla Sign & the Weeknd | |
| 22 | Gult myrkur | Guðrið Hansdóttir | Nordic Notes | | |
| 22 | Black Miracles and Dark Wonders | Miseration | Massacre Records | Mixed and mastered by Plec | |

=== May ===
| Day | Album | Artist | Label | Notes | Ref. |
|---|---|---|---|---|---|
| 6 | How to Let Go | Sigrid | Music for Nations | | |
| 6 | My Father's Son | Jani Liimatainen | Frontiers Music Srl | Featuring Tony Kakko, Timo Kotipelto, Antti Railio, et al | |
| 20 | Eyeye | Lykke Li | PIAS Recordings | | |
| 27 | Justitia | Baest | Century Media Records | EP | |
| 27 | OMR | Omar Rudberg | | Debut album | |
| 27 | Aerial | Anna Thorvaldsdóttir | Sono Luminus | Caput Ens; Nordic Affect; Iceland SO / Ilan Volkov et al (originally released on Deutsche Grammophon in 2014) | |
| 27 | Flamingo Overload | Trollfest | Napalm Records | | |

=== June ===
| Day | Album | Artist | Label | Notes | Ref. |
|---|---|---|---|---|---|
| 3 | Be Here Soon | iamamiwhoami | To whom it may concern | First studio album for 8 years | |
| 17 | Missaoui | Cleo | Random Bastards | | |
| 17 | Over the Horizon Radar | Jorn | | Mixed and mastered by Alessandro Del Vecchio | |
| 17 | Bliss | Tungsten | Arising Empire | | |
| 24 | Inhuman Spirits | Darkane | Massacre Records | | |
| 24 | Svartsyn | Khold | Soulseller Records | | |

=== July ===
| Day | Album | Artist | Label | Notes | Ref. |
|---|---|---|---|---|---|
| 8 | Wisdom | Altaria | Reaper Entertainment | 20th anniversary album (delayed by COVID-19) | |
| 8 | Lifestyles of the Sick & Dangerous | Blind Channel | Century Media Records | | |
| 15 | Elastic Wave | Gard Nilssen's Acoustic Unity | ECM Records | Featuring André Roligheten and Petter Eldh | |
| 22 | Nightside | Witchery | Century Media Records | | |
| 29 | Deceivers | Arch Enemy | Century Media Records | | |
| 29 | Dead Inside | Torture Killer | The Other Records | EP - First release for 9 years | |

=== August ===
| Day | Album | Artist | Label | Notes | Ref. |
|---|---|---|---|---|---|
| 5 | The Great Heathen Army | Amon Amarth | Metal Blade Records | | |
| 12 | Days of the Lost | The Halo Effect | Century Media Records | Debut album | |
| 19 | Drif | Heilung | Season of Mist | Recorded at Lava Studios Copenhagen | |
| 19 | Övergivenheten | Soilwork | Nuclear Blast | First album with Rasmus Ehrnborn as bassist | |
| 26 | Voices in the Sky | Brymir | Napalm Records | | |
| 26 | Life of a Rainbow | Aura Dione | Mermaid Records | | |
| 26 | Final Advent | Dynazty | AFM Records | | |
| 26 | March of the Obsequious | Tad Morose | GMR Music Group | Featuring Andreas Silén | |

=== September ===
| Day | Album | Artist | Label | Notes | Ref. |
|---|---|---|---|---|---|
| 2 | Älskar | Nina Nesbitt | Cooking Vinyl | With Jack & Coke and Shy Martin | |
| 9 | Ei Meillä Ole Kuin Loisemme | Ville Laihiala & Saattajat | Sakara Records | Debut solo album | |
| 16 | The Great Seal | Spiritus Mortis | Svart Records | | |
| 23 | Survive | Stratovarius | | | |
| 30 | Fossora | Björk | One Little Independent Records | Inspired by the death of the artist's mother | |
| 30 | If the Sky Came Down | Lost Society | Nuclear Blast | | |
| 30 | Acoustic Adventures – Volume Two | Sonata Arctica | Atomic Fire | | |

=== October ===
| Day | Album | Artist | Label | Notes | Ref. |
|---|---|---|---|---|---|
| 7 | En Är för Mycket och Tusen Aldrig Nog | Dungen | Mexican Summer | First album for 7 years | |
| 7 | If the Sky Came Down | Lost Society | Nuclear Blast | | |
| 14 | The Power of the Nightstar | Dragonland | AFM Records | | |
| 14 | Acoustic in Hell | Eleine | Atomic Fire Records | EP | |
| 14 | Dirt Femme | Tove Lo | Pretty Swede Records | First independent release | |
| 21 | Death, Where Is Your Sting | Avatarium | AFM Records | | |
| 21 | Når sjælen kaster op | Tobias Rahim | Sony Music Denmark | No. 1 on the Danish albums chart | |
| 21 | Pandemonium | Gothminister | AFM Records | Largely recorded in Kulturkirken Jakob, Oslo | |
| 21 | Tár (Music from and Inspired by the Motion Picture) | Hildur Guðnadóttir | Deutsche Grammophon | Recorded at Abbey Road Studios | |
| 28 | Astral Fortress | Darkthrone | Peaceville Records | | |
| 28 | Grind Over Matter | Defleshed | Metal Blade Records | | |
| 28 | Dystopia – Part II | Royal Hunt | NorthPoint Productions | Released on October 26 via King Records (Japan/SE Asia) | |
| 28 | Leviathan II | Therion | Nuclear Blast | | |

=== November ===
| Day | Album | Artist | Label | Notes | Ref. |
|---|---|---|---|---|---|
| 11 | Til Klovers Takt | Kampfar | Indie Recordings | Ninth studio album | |
| 18 | Sweet Evil Sun | Candlemass | Napalm Records | | |
| 18 | Seraph | Tine Thing Helseth | LAWO Classics | With Ensemble Allegria | |
| 25 | Diversum | In the Woods... | Soulseller Records | First album featuring vocalist Bernt Fjellestad | |
| 25 | Ofermodian Litanies | Ofermod | Shadow Records | Mini-album | |

=== December ===
| Day | Album | Artist | Label | Notes | Ref. |
|---|---|---|---|---|---|
| 2 | Take a Chance – A Metal Tribute to ABBA | Amberian Dawn | Napalm Records | ABBA covers album | |
| 25 | This Is Heavy Metal, Plain & Simple | Snowy Shaw | | Compilation album | |
| 30 | Aamongandr | Satanic Warmaster | Werewolf Records | | |

== Eurovision Song Contest ==
- Denmark in the Eurovision Song Contest 2022
- Finland in the Eurovision Song Contest 2022
- Iceland in the Eurovision Song Contest 2022
- Norway in the Eurovision Song Contest 2022
- Sweden in the Eurovision Song Contest 2022

== Classical works ==
- Hildur Guðnadóttir – The Fact of the Matter
- Mats Larsson Gothe and Susanne Marko – Löftet (opera)
- Jaakko Kuusisto – Symphony, Op. 39 (completed by Pekka Kuusisto)
- Ville Raasakka – The Harvest, for chamber orchestra
- Anna S. Þorvaldsdóttir – ARCHORA
- Sauli Zinovjev – Piano Concerto

== Film and television music ==
- Hildur Guðnadóttir - Women Talking
- Krister Linder – Boy from Heaven
- Marius Christiansen - Etterglød (Afterglow)
- Johan Söderqvist - Anatomy of a Scandal
- Mikkel Maltha and Leslie Ming - Triangle of Sadness

== Deaths ==
- 18 January – Paavo Heininen, Finnish composer, 84
- 25 January – Fredrik Johansson, Swedish guitarist, 47 (cancer)
- 20 February – Nils Lindberg, Swedish composer and pianist, 88
- 23 February – Jaakko Kuusisto, Finnish composer, conductor and violinist, 48 (brain cancer)
- 22 March – Tommy Tokyo, Norwegian singer, guitarist and songwriter, 50
- 9 April – Birgit Nordin, Swedish operatic soprano, 88
- 9 April – Trygve Thue, Norwegian guitarist and producer, 71
- 6 May – Alf Hambe, Swedish writer, composer and singer-songwriter, 91
- 10 May – Kjell Lönnå, Swedish choirmaster, conductor and composer, 85
- 18 July – Povl Dissing, Danish singer, composer, guitarist, and harmonica player, 84
- 6 August – Torgny Söderberg, Swedish songwriter, 77
- 9 August – Jussi Hakulinen, Finnish musician and singer-songwriter, 57
- 10 August – Vesa-Matti Loiri, Finnish actor and musician, 77
- 15 August – Hans (Hasse) Magnusson, Swedish saxophonist, 73
- 16 August – Matti Lehtinen, Finnish baritone, 100
- August – Kimmo Blom, Finnish rock singer and musician, 52 (cancer)
- 14 September (death announced on this date) – David Andersson, 47, Swedish heavy metal guitarist (Soilwork)
- 5 October – Ann-Christine Nyström, 78, Finnish Eurovision singer
- 30 October (death announced on this date) – Ryan Karazija, 40, American-Icelandic musician (Low Roar)
- 9 November – Mattis Hætta, 63, Norwegian Sami singer
- 23 November – Hugo Helmig, 24, Danish singer-songwriter
- 1 December – Tord Sjöman, 82, Swedish organist (Vikingarna).
- 3 December – Svenne Hedlund, 77, Swedish pop singer
- 26 December – Lars Lönndahl, 94, Swedish singer ("The Swedish Frank Sinatra")
