= List of number-one hits of 2021 (Denmark) =

Tracklisten is a chart that ranks the best-performing singles and tracks in Denmark. Its data, published by IFPI Denmark and compiled by Nielsen Music Control, is based collectively on each single's weekly digital sales.

== Chart history ==
Week	Issue date	Song	Artist(s)	Ref.
1	13 January 2021	"Bando Bitch"	Branco	
2	20 January 2021	"Drivers License"	Olivia Rodrigo	
3	27 January 2021	"Drivers License"	Olivia Rodrigo	
4	3 February 2021	"Drivers License"	Olivia Rodrigo	
5	10 February 2021	"Drivers License"	Olivia Rodrigo	
6	17 February 2021	"No Evil"	Branco and Lukas Graham	
7	24 February 2021	"Drivers License"	Olivia Rodrigo	
8	3 March 2021	"Save Your Tears"	The Weeknd	
9	10 March 2021	"Drivers License"	Olivia Rodrigo	
10	17 March 2021	"Øve os på hinanden"	Fyr og Flamme	
11	24 March 2021	"Save Your Tears"	The Weeknd	
12	31 March 2021	"Peaches"	Justin Bieber featuring Daniel Caesar and Giveon	
13	7 April 2021	"Peaches"	Justin Bieber featuring Daniel Caesar and Giveon	
14	14 April 2021	"Peaches"	Justin Bieber featuring Daniel Caesar and Giveon	
15	21 April 2021	"Peaches"	Justin Bieber featuring Daniel Caesar and Giveon	
16	28 April 2021	"Peaches"	Justin Bieber featuring Daniel Caesar and Giveon	
17	5 May 2021	"Peaches"	Justin Bieber featuring Daniel Caesar and Giveon	
18	12 May 2021	"Peaches"	Justin Bieber featuring Daniel Caesar and Giveon	
19	19 May 2021	"Kærlighed"	Gilli	
20	26 May 2021	"Er Her"	Artigeardit and KESI	
21	2 June 2021	"Good 4 U"	Olivia Rodrigo	
22	9 June 2021	"Good 4 U"	Olivia Rodrigo	
23	16 June 2021	"Er Her"	Artigeardit and KESI	
24	23 June 2021	"Er Her"	Artigeardit and KESI	
25	30 June 2021	"Ibiza"	Benny Jamz, Gilli and KESI as B.O.C	
26	7 July 2021	"Ibiza"	Benny Jamz, Gilli and KESI as B.O.C	
27	14 July 2021	"Helt sikker"	Gulddreng	
28	21 July 2021	"Bad Habits"	Ed Sheeran	
29	28 July 2021	"Bad Habits"	Ed Sheeran	
30	4 August 2021	"Bad Habits"	Ed Sheeran	
31	11 August 2021	"Bad Habits"	Ed Sheeran	
32	18 August 2021	"Stay"	The Kid Laroi and Justin Bieber	
33	25 August 2021	"Stay"	The Kid Laroi and Justin Bieber	
34	1 September 2021	"Stay"	The Kid Laroi and Justin Bieber	
35	8 September 2021	"Stay"	The Kid Laroi and Justin Bieber	
36	15 September 2021	"Stay"	The Kid Laroi and Justin Bieber	
37	22 September 2021	"Bad Habits"	Ed Sheeran	
38	29 September 2021	"Bad Habits"	Ed Sheeran	
39	6 October 2021	"Bad Habits"	Ed Sheeran	
40	13 October 2021	"Stor mand"	Tobias Rahim featuring Andreas Odbjerg	
41	20 October 2021	"Stor mand"	Tobias Rahim featuring Andreas Odbjerg	
42	27 October 2021	"Easy on Me"	Adele	
43	3 November 2021	"Stor mand"	Tobias Rahim featuring Andreas Odbjerg	
44	10 November 2021	"Stor mand"	Tobias Rahim featuring Andreas Odbjerg	
45	17 November 2021	"Stor mand"	Tobias Rahim featuring Andreas Odbjerg	
46	24 November 2021	"Stor mand"	Tobias Rahim featuring Andreas Odbjerg	
47	1 December 2021	"Stor mand"	Tobias Rahim featuring Andreas Odbjerg	
48	8 December 2021	"Last Christmas"	Wham!	
49	15 December 2021	"Last Christmas"	Wham!	
50	22 December 2021	"Last Christmas"	Wham!	
51	29 December 2021	"Last Christmas"	Wham!	
52	5 January 2022	"Stor mand"	Tobias Rahim featuring Andreas Odbjerg	
