= Hjem fra fabrikken =

2022 studio album by Andreas Odbjerg

Studio album by Andreas Odbjerg
- Released: 4 March 2022
- Genre: Funk; pop; rock
- Length: 34:52
- Label: Universal Music Denmark
- Producer: Philip Owusu; Pitchshifters; Mads Dyrst; Rune Borup; Ole Bjørn; Daniel Scheffmann

Andreas Odbjerg chronology
Lance Armstrong (2020)	Hjem fra fabrikken (2022)	Un hommage (2024)

Singles from Hjem fra fabrikken
- 1. "I morgen er der også en dag" Released: 26 March 2021; 2. "Velkommen tilbage" Released: 25 June 2021; 3. "Blev du fanget af noget?" Released: 21 January 2022

Hjem fra fabrikken (transl. Home from the factory) is the debut studio album from Danish singer-songwriter Andreas Odbjerg. The album, released on 4 March 2022, was published by Universal Music Denmark. It has since become a number-one album in Denmark, and has been certified Platinum three times by IFPI Danmark.

== Release and reception ==
Professional ratings
Review scores
Source	Rating
Berlingske	5/6 stars
Gaffa	5/6 stars
Jyllands-Posten	4/6 stars
Kristeligt Dagblad	5/6 stars
Politiken	6/6 stars
Soundvenue	5/6 stars

Making his breakthrough with "Føler mig selv 100" in 2019, and later featuring on popular Danish hit "Stor mand" with Tobias Rahim, Odbjerg's debut studio album was anticipated when it was first announced in January 2022. Three singles preceded the album's release, with "Blev du fanget af noget?" being the last of them when it released in January. Hjem fra fabrikken released on 4 March 2022.

The album received generally positive reviews, with Politiken giving it a rating of six out of six hearts. Soundvenue reviewer Kjartan Stolberg highlighted the songwriting, writing that Odbjerg had cemented himself as one of Denmark's best. Reviews from several publications were split on the lyrics, with Politiken and Dagbladet Information saw the relatable writing and humanist, while Jyllands-Posten writer Anders Houmøller Thomsen wrote the lyrics were catchy but shallow.

Following the album's release, Hjem fra fabrikken first appeared on the Hitlisten charts at number two on 16 March. Five weeks later, it became a number-one album in Denmark, a position it held for three weeks. The album's title track, "Hjem fra fabrikken", became Odbjerg's first number-one hit single when it reached number one the same week as the album. The album has since gone on to achieve Platinum certification three times by IFPI Danmark, with the title track achieving Platinum four times.

== Accolades ==
The album received several Danish music awards following its release. The album's first nominations awards came in November 2022 at the annual Danish Music Awards, where it was nominated for Album of the Year and Odbjerg nominated for Songwriter of the Year for the album. At the 2023 GAFFA Awards, Hjem fra fabrikken won Danish Release of the Year and Danish Pop Release of the Year. Odbjerg himself also received awards at the show.

Several songs from the album also received recognition in the Danish music industry, both before and after the album's release. "I morgen er der også en dag" was nominated for Danish Radio Hit of the Year at the 2021 Danish Music Awards, where Odbjerg received his first two awards for the song, including Songwriter of the Year. The song also won Danish Hit of the Year the following year at the GAFFA Awards. The album's title track, "Hjem fra fabrikken", was later nominated for Listener Hit at the Guld awards presented by DR P3 in late 2022. Like the previous year, the title track was nominated and won the award for Danish Radio Hit of the Year at the 2022 Danish Music Awards, while also being nominated for Danish Streaming Hit of the Year.

Year	Award	Category	Recipient(s)	Result	Ref.
2021	Danish Music Awards	Danish Radio Hit of the Year	"I morgen er der også en dag"	Nominated	
2021	Danish Music Awards	Danish Songwriter of the Year	"I morgen er der også en dag"	Won	
2022	Årets Steppeulv	Song of the Year	"I morgen er der også en dag"	Won	
2022	Danish Music Awards	Danish Radio Hit of the Year	"Hjem fra fabrikken"	Won	
2022	Danish Music Awards	Danish Streaming Hit of the Year	"Hjem fra fabrikken"	Nominated	
2022	Danish Music Awards	Danish Songwriter of the Year	Hjem fra fabrikken	Nominated	
2022	Danish Music Awards	Danish Album of the Year	Hjem fra fabrikken	Nominated	
2022	GAFFA Awards	Danish Hit of the Year	"I morgen er der også en dag"	Won	
2022	P3 Guld	Listener Hit	"Hjem fra fabrikken"	Nominated	
2023	EchoPrisen	Hit of the Year	"Hjem fra fabrikken"	Nominated	
2023	GAFFA Awards	Danish Hit of the Year	"Hjem fra fabrikken"	Nominated	
2023	GAFFA Awards	Danish Release of the Year	Hjem fra fabrikken	Won	
2023	GAFFA Awards	Pop Release of the Year	Hjem fra fabrikken	Won	

== Track listing ==
No.	Title	Lyrics	Producer(s)	Length
1.	"Gear" (featuring Philip Owusu and La classe moyenne)	Odbjerg	Owusu; Pitchshifters	3:53
2.	"Stempler ud"	Odbjerg	Pitchshifters	3:19
3.	"Velsignelsen" (featuring La classe moyenne)	Odbjerg	Pitchshifters; Mads Dyrst	4:35
4.	"Blev du fanget af noget"	Odbjerg	Pitchshifters	2:58
5.	"Facebook"	Odbjerg	Pitchshifters; Dyrst	2:43
6.	"Business"	Odbjerg	Pitchshifters; Dyrst	3:02
7.	"Hjem fra fabrikken"	Odbjerg	Pitchshifters; Rune Borup	3:28
8.	"Wendy"	Odbjerg	Ole Bjørn; Daniel Scheffmann	4:09
9.	"Velkommen tilbage"	Odbjerg	Bjørn; Scheffmann	3:22
10.	"I morgen er der også en dag"	Odbjerg	Bjørn; Scheffmann	3:18
Total length:				34:52

== Charts ==
=== Weekly charts ===
Weekly chart performance
Chart (2022–2026)	Peak position
Danish Albums (Hitlisten)	1

=== Year-end charts ===
Year-end chart performance
Chart	Year	Position
Danish Albums (Hitlisten)	2022	3
Danish Albums (Hitlisten)	2023	32
Danish Albums (Hitlisten)	2023	93

== Certifications ==
Certifications
Region	Certification	Certified units/sales
Denmark (IFPI Danmark)	4× Platinum	80,000^{‡}
^{*} Sales figures based on certification alone.^{‡} Sales+streaming figures based on certification alone.
