= List of number-one hits of 2023 (Denmark) =

Tracklisten is a chart that ranks the best-performing singles and tracks in Denmark. Its data, published by IFPI Denmark and compiled by Nielsen Music Control, is based collectively on each single's weekly digital sales.

== Chart history ==
List of number-one hits
Week	Issue date	Song	Artist(s)	Ref.
1	11 January 2023	"Flyvende Faduma"	Tobias Rahim	
2	18 January 2023	"Escapism"	Raye featuring 070 Shake	
3	25 January 2023	"Flowers"	Miley Cyrus	
4	1 February 2023	"Flowers"	Miley Cyrus	
5	8 February 2023	"Flowers"	Miley Cyrus	
6	15 February 2023	"Flowers"	Miley Cyrus	
7	22 February 2023	"Flowers"	Miley Cyrus	
8	1 March 2023	"Flowers"	Miley Cyrus	
9	8 March 2023	"For altid"	TopGunn	
10	15 March 2023	"For altid"	TopGunn	
11	22 March 2023	"Flowers"	Miley Cyrus	
12	29 March 2023	"Flowers"	Miley Cyrus	
13	5 April 2023	"Flowers"	Miley Cyrus	
14	12 April 2023	"Flowers"	Miley Cyrus	
15	19 April 2023	"God pige"	Danser med piger featuring TopGunn	
16	26 April 2023	"God pige"	Danser med piger featuring TopGunn	
17	3 May 2023	"God pige"	Danser med piger featuring TopGunn	
18	10 May 2023	"God pige"	Danser med piger featuring TopGunn	
19	17 May 2023	"God pige"	Danser med piger featuring TopGunn	
20	24 May 2023	"Uden dig"	Ukendt Kunstner	
21	31 May 2023	"Uden dig"	Ukendt Kunstner	
22	7 June 2023	"Uden dig"	Ukendt Kunstner	
23	14 June 2023	"Uden dig"	Ukendt Kunstner	
24	21 June 2023	"Tak for sidst"	Gobs	
25	28 June 2023	"Tak for sidst"	Gobs	
26	5 July 2023	"Tak for sidst"	Gobs	
27	12 July 2023	"Tak for sidst"	Gobs	
28	19 July 2023	"Tak for sidst"	Gobs	
29	26 July 2023	"Tak for sidst"	Gobs	
30	2 August 2023	"Tak for sidst"	Gobs	
31	9 August 2023	"Tak for sidst"	Gobs	
32	16 August 2023	"Tak for sidst"	Gobs	
33	23 August 2023	"Tak for sidst"	Gobs	
34	30 August 2023	"Tak for sidst"	Gobs	
35	6 September 2023	"Tak for sidst"	Gobs	
36	13 September 2023	"Tak for sidst"	Gobs	
37	20 September 2023	"I Know"	D1MA	
38	27 September 2023	"Greedy"	Tate McRae	
39	4 October 2023	"Greedy"	Tate McRae	
40	11 October 2023	"Greedy"	Tate McRae	
41	18 October 2023	"Skarpt lys"	Gilli	
42	25 October 2023	"Skarpt lys"	Gilli	
43	1 November 2023	"Skarpt lys"	Gilli	
44	8 November 2023	"Skarpt lys"	Gilli	
45	15 November 2023	"555"	Gilli and Kesi	
46	22 November 2023	"555"	Gilli and Kesi	
47	29 November 2023	"555"	Gilli and Kesi	
48	6 December 2023	"Last Christmas"	Wham!	
49	13 December 2023	"Last Christmas"	Wham!	
50	20 December 2023	"Last Christmas"	Wham!	
51	27 December 2023	"Last Christmas"	Wham!	
52	4 January 2024	"Last Christmas"	Wham!	
