= List of number-one hits of 2022 (Denmark) =

Tracklisten is a chart that ranks the best-performing singles and tracks in Denmark. Its data, published by IFPI Denmark and compiled by Nielsen Music Control, is based collectively on each single's weekly digital sales.

== Chart history ==
Week	Issue date	Song	Artist(s)	Ref.
1	12 January 2022	"Stor mand"	Tobias Rahim featuring Andreas Odbjerg	
2	19 January 2022	"Stor mand"	Tobias Rahim featuring Andreas Odbjerg	
3	26 January 2022	"Stor mand"	Tobias Rahim featuring Andreas Odbjerg	
4	2 February 2022	"Stor mand"	Tobias Rahim featuring Andreas Odbjerg	
5	9 February 2022	"Stor mand"	Tobias Rahim featuring Andreas Odbjerg	
6	16 February 2022	"Half a Man"	Dean Lewis	
7	23 February 2022	"Stor mand"	Tobias Rahim featuring Andreas Odbjerg	
8	2 March 2022	"Stor mand"	Tobias Rahim featuring Andreas Odbjerg	
9	9 March 2022	"Mucki bar"	Tobias Rahim	
10	16 March 2022	"Mucki bar"	Tobias Rahim	
11	23 March 2022	"Mucki bar"	Tobias Rahim	
12	30 March 2022	"Mucki bar"	Tobias Rahim	
13	6 April 2022	"Mucki bar"	Tobias Rahim	
14	13 April 2022	"As It Was"	Harry Styles	
15	20 April 2022	"Hjem fra fabrikken"	Andreas Odbjerg	
16	27 April 2022	"Hjem fra fabrikken"	Andreas Odbjerg	
17	4 May 2022	"Mucki Bar"	Tobias Rahim	
18	11 May 2022	"Mucki Bar"	Tobias Rahim	
19	18 May 2022	"Mucki Bar"	Tobias Rahim	
20	25 May 2022	"Mucki Bar"	Tobias Rahim	
21	1 June 2022	"Mucki Bar"	Tobias Rahim	
22	8 June 2022	"Mucki Bar"	Tobias Rahim	
23	15 June 2022	"Feberdrømmer xx Dubai"	Tobias Rahim	
24	22 June 2022	"Feberdrømmer xx Dubai"	Tobias Rahim	
25	29 June 2022	"Feberdrømmer xx Dubai"	Tobias Rahim	
26	6 July 2022	"Feberdrømmer xx Dubai"	Tobias Rahim	
27	13 July 2022	"Feberdrømmer xx Dubai"	Tobias Rahim	
28	20 July 2022	"Feberdrømmer xx Dubai"	Tobias Rahim	
29	27 July 2022	"Feberdrømmer xx Dubai"	Tobias Rahim	
30	3 August 2022	"Feberdrømmer xx Dubai"	Tobias Rahim	
31	10 August 2022	"Feberdrømmer xx Dubai"	Tobias Rahim	
32	17 August 2022	"Feberdrømmer xx Dubai"	Tobias Rahim	
33	24 August 2022	"Flyvende Faduma"	Tobias Rahim	
34	31 August 2022	"Flyvende Faduma"	Tobias Rahim	
35	7 September 2022	"Flyvende Faduma"	Tobias Rahim	
36	14 September 2022	"Flyvende Faduma"	Tobias Rahim	
37	21 September 2022	"I'm Good (Blue)"	David Guetta and Bebe Rexha	
38	28 September 2022	"I'm Good (Blue)"	David Guetta and Bebe Rexha	
39	5 October 2022	"Flyvende Faduma"	Tobias Rahim	
40	12 October 2022	"I'm Good (Blue)"	David Guetta and Bebe Rexha	
41	19 October 2022	"Flyvende Faduma"	Tobias Rahim	
42	26 October 2022	"Verden vågner"	Saveus and Gilli	
43	2 November 2022	"Flyvende Faduma"	Tobias Rahim	
44	9 November 2022	"Verden vågner"	Saveus and Gilli	
45	16 November 2022	"Verden vågner"	Saveus and Gilli	
46	23 November 2022	"Verden vågner"	Saveus and Gilli	
47	30 November 2022	"Tinka"	Burhan G and Frida Brygmann	
48	7 December 2022	"Tinka"	Burhan G and Frida Brygmann	
49	14 December 2022	"Tinka"	Burhan G and Frida Brygmann	
50	21 December 2022	"Tinka"	Burhan G and Frida Brygmann	
51	28 December 2022	"Julehjertets hemmelighed"	Malte Ebert	
52	4 January 2023	"Julehjertets hemmelighed"	Malte Ebert	
