= List of number-one hits of 2026 (Denmark) =

Hitlisten is a chart that ranks the best-performing singles and tracks in Denmark. Its data, published by IFPI Danmark and compiled by M&I Service, are based collectively on each song's weekly digital sales and streaming figures.

== Chart history ==
List of number-one hits
Week	Issue date	Song	Artist(s)	Ref.
1	14 January 2026	"En drøm om et menneske"	Aphaca	
2	21 January 2026	"Vil du noget?"	Guldimund and Saveus	
3	28 January 2026	"Vil du noget?"	Guldimund and Saveus	
4	4 February 2026	"Vil du noget?"	Guldimund and Saveus	
5	11 February 2026	"Vil du noget?"	Guldimund and Saveus	
6	18 February 2026	"Minder hos andre Freestyle"	Anton Westerlin and Mille	
7	25 February 2026	"Minder hos andre Freestyle"	Anton Westerlin and Mille	
8	4 March 2026	"Minder hos andre Freestyle"	Anton Westerlin and Mille	
9	11 March 2026	"Flue i et spind"	Aphaca	
10	18 March 2026	"Flue i et spind"	Aphaca	
11	25 March 2026	"Flue i et spind"	Aphaca	
12	1 April 2026	"Livsforladt"	Annika	
13	8 April 2026	"Livsforladt"	Annika	
14	15 April 2026	"Livsforladt"	Annika	
15	22 April 2026	"Den danske sommer"	Tobias Rahim featuring Birthe Kjær	
16	29 April 2026	"Den danske sommer"	Tobias Rahim featuring Birthe Kjær	
17	6 May 2026	"Den danske sommer"	Tobias Rahim featuring Birthe Kjær	
18	13 May 2026	"Ærlig Freestyle"	Anton Westerlin and Annika	
19	20 May 2026	"Drukner"	Kesi featuring Annika	
20	27 May 2026	"Drukner"	Kesi featuring Annika	
21	3 June 2026	"Drukner"	Kesi featuring Annika	
22	10 June 2026	"Ringer om natten"	Christopher	
23	17 June 2026	"Ringer om natten"	Christopher	
24	24 June 2026	"Ringer om natten"	Christopher	
25	1 July 2026	"Hold mit tempo"	Lamin featuring Annika	
26	8 July 2026	"Hold mit tempo"	Lamin featuring Annika	
27	15 July 2026	"Hold mit tempo"	Lamin featuring Annika	
28	22 July 2026	"Hold mit tempo"	Lamin featuring Annika	
29	29 July 2026	"Desperado"	Annika	
30	5 August 2026	"Desperado"	Annika	
31	12 August 2026	"Desperado"	Annika	
32	19 August 2026	"Shen Mao"	Kundo	
33	26 August 2026	"Shen Mao"	Kundo	
34	2 September 2026	"Shen Mao"	Kundo	
35	9 September 2026	"Shen Mao"	Kundo	
36	16 September 2026	"Elsker dig så meget jeg ku' gå i stykke"	Christopher	
37	23 September 2026	"Shen Mao"	Kundo	
38	30 September 2026	"Herinde"	Gilli featuring Hans Philip	
39	7 October 2026	"Shen Mao"	Kundo	
40	14 October 2026	"Hat du mærket dig selv?"	Gobs	
41	21 October 2026	"Elsker dig så meget jeg ku' gå i stykke"	Christopher	
42	28 October 2026	"Hvis jeg er uden dig"	Annika	
43	4 November 2026	"Housewife"	Tate McRae	
44	11 November 2026	"Housewife"	Tate McRae	
45	18 November 2026	"Housewife"	Tate McRae	
