= Feberdrømmer xx Dubai =

2022 single by Tobias Rahim

Single by Tobias Rahim

from the album Når sjælen kaster op
- Released: 3 June 2022
- Genre: Pop
- Length: 3:41
- Label: Sony Music Denmark
- Songwriters: Tobias Rahim; Arto Eriksen
- Producer: Arto Eriksen

Music video
- "Feberdrømmer Xx Dubai" on YouTube

"Feberdrømmer xx Dubai" (transl. Fever Dream xx Dubai) is a song by the Danish singer Tobias Rahim from his second studio album, Når sjælen kaster op. The song was written and composed by Rahim. Arto Eriksen served as the song's producer, while also assisting in the song's composition. It was initially released as a single on 3 June 2022.

Since its release, "Feberdrømmer Xx Dubai" spent ten weeks at number-one on the Danish charts and has been certified Platinum four times.

== Release and reception ==
Rahim released "Feberdrømmer xx Dubai" as a single on 3 June 2022. The song was later included on Rahim's 2022 studio album Når sjælen kaster op. The song was a continuation of Rahim's success on the Hitlisten charts in 2022, where Rahim held the number-one spot for 20 consecutive weeks with three different tracks. The song reached it's number-one spot on 15 June 2022, a week where Rahim held the top three singles, all produced and composed with Art Eriksen. The song stayed in regular rotation on DR P3 for much of 2022 and into mid-2023.

At the end of 2022, "Feberdrømmer xx Dubai" placed fourth on Hitlisten's top 100 tracks of the year. It remained in 2023's top tracks, falling to 37th. The song first received certification from IFPI Danmark in August 2022, and has since gone on to become certified Platinum four times. It was later included on the top 10 highest earning tracks in Denmark for 2023, along with three other songs from Rahim.

== Accolades ==
"Feberdrømmer xx Dubai" received two nominations for awards. In November 2022, it first received a nomination for Danish Streaming Hit of the Year at the Danish Music Awards. The award which was ultimately won by another Rahim song, "Mucki bar". Months later, in March 2023, "Feberdrømmer xx Dubai" won its first award when it was named as Hit of the Year at TV 2 Echo's EchoPris.

Year	Award	Category	Recipient(s)	Result	Ref.
2022	Danish Music Awards	Danish Streaming Hit of the Year	"Feberdrømmer xx Dubai"	Nominated	
2023	EchoPrisen	Hit of the Year	"Feberdrømmer xx Dubai"	Won	

== Personnel ==
Credits are adapted from the media notes on Når sjælen kaster op.

- Tobias Rahim – vocals, lyrics, composer
- Arto Eriksen – synthesizer, drums, programming, violin, composer, producer
- Frederik Nordsø – bass
- Fridolin Nordsø – tambourine, shaker
- Jesper Vivid Vestergaard – mastering engineer, mixing engineer
- Lasse Joen Sørensen – mixing engineer

== Charts ==
=== Weekly charts ===
Weekly chart performance
Chart (2022–2026)	Peak position
Danish Tracks (Hitlisten)	1

=== Year-end charts ===
Year-end chart performance
Chart	Year	Position
Danish Albums (Hitlisten)	2022	4
Danish Albums (Hitlisten)	2023	37

== Certifications ==
Certifications for "Feberdrømmer xx Dubai"
Region	Certification	Certified units/sales
Denmark (IFPI Danmark)	4× Platinum	360,000^{‡}
^{*} Sales figures based on certification alone.^{^} Shipments figures based on certification alone.^{‡} Sales+streaming figures based on certification alone.

== See also ==
- List of number-one hits of 2022 (Denmark)
