= Andkær =

Town in Denmark

- Village
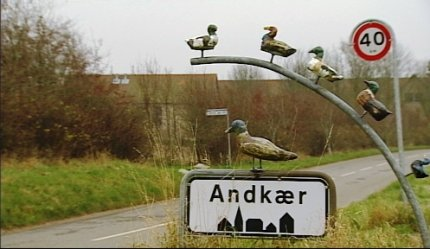
- The city sign of Andkær

- Location in Region of Southern Denmark Andkær (Denmark)
- Coordinates: 55°39′59″N 9°37′37″E
- Country: Denmark
- Region: Southern Denmark
- Municipality: Vejle Municipality
- Parish: Gauerslund Parish

Population (2026)
  - Total: 371

Andkær is a village in Vejle Municipality, Region of Southern Denmark in Denmark with a population of 371 (1 January 2026). It is located eight kilometres southeast of Vejle, four kilometres west of Brejning and four kilometres northwest of Børkop.

== Notable people ==
- Gulddreng (born 1994 in Andkær), stage name of Malte Ebert, a Danish musician
