= Ida Laurberg =

Danish singer and songwriter (born 2000)

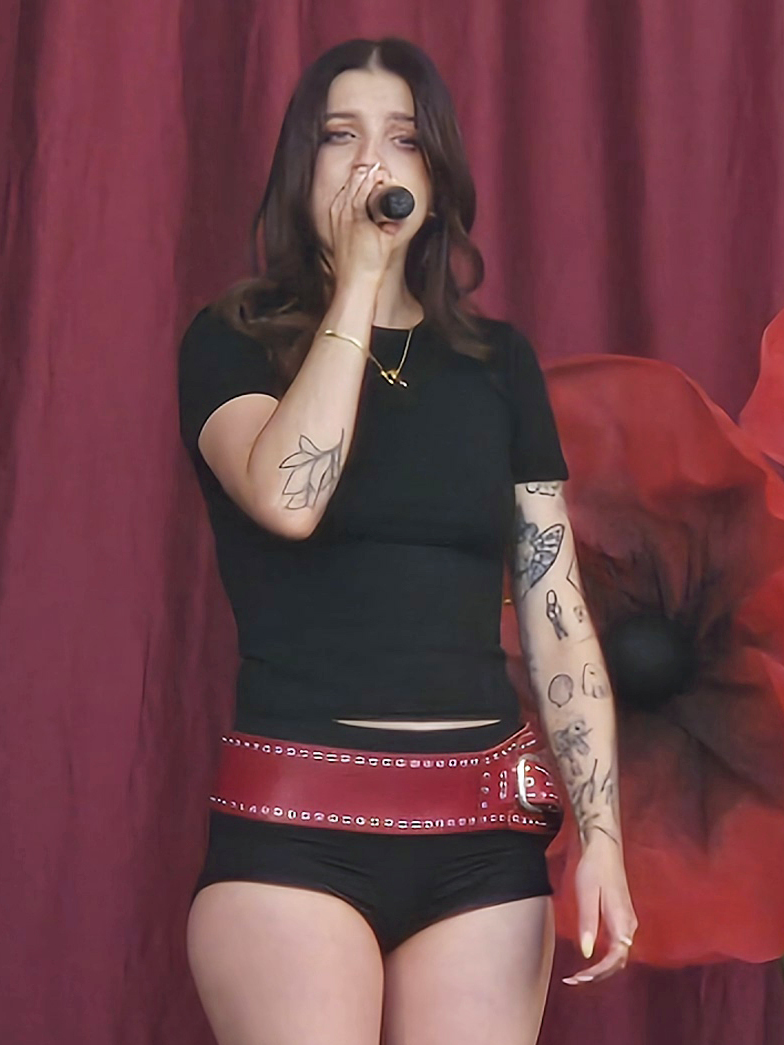
- Laurberg performing at Skodborg ParkRock 2024

Background information
- Born: Ida Engelgaar Laurberg; 2000 (age 25–26); Helsinge, Denmark
- Genre: Pop
- Occupations: Singer; songwriter
- Years active: 2016–present
- Label: Universal Music Denmark

Ida Engelgaar Laurberg (born 2000) is a Danish singer and songwriter. She has released one studio album with two top 10 hits in the Danish charts, receiving two awards from the Danish Music Awards as a result.

== Career ==
Laurberg grew up in the town of Helsinge, Denmark, where she attended a private Christian school during her youth. She attributed developing anxiety as a result of her time there due to bullying from classmates, as well as teachers. However, one teacher did encourage her to pursue becoming a musician after hearing her play, which she cited as an influence. After graduation from school, she moved into an apartment in Copenhagen, which led to her first solo performance at a local outdoor venue, Byhaven.

At age 16, Laurberg released her first single "Puppy Dog Eyes" on 8 November 2016. Four years later, she released her debut EP titled, Phase Five. Released on her own record label, the EP received positive reviews and drew comparisons to Billie Eilish, whom Laurberg cited as an inspiration for her own music.

Her debut studio album was released on 21 August 2020, entitled Bænkevarmer. The first single from the album, "Terrier", reached number six on the Danish charts. The song covered topics surrounding mental health, including self-harm. The second single released from the album "Jeg ka' rigtig godt li' dig" further increased her profile in the music scene, ultimately receiving an award for "Danish Hit of the Year" at the Danish Music Awards, alongside Andreas Odbjerg who featured in the song. The song has reached number two on the Danish charts, and the duo has performed the song at several festivals, including Roskilde Festival in 2023. In addition to the awards, the song reached double triple-certification by IFPI Danmark.

== Personal life ==
Laurberg has been diagnosed with both anxiety and depression, and has stated on several occasions that both play a factor in her creative process for writing music. In 2023, she was diagnosed with ADHD. She sought out a diagnosis following conversations with her then-boyfriend, as well as trying ADHD medication. She has stated that she wants to use the platform afforded to her through music to create openness about mental health.

== Discography ==
=== Studio albums ===
Title	Details	Peak chart positions	Certifications
Title	Details	DEN	Certifications
Bænkevarmer	Released: 22 March 2024; Label: Capitol Records Denmark, Universal Music Denmark	17	IFPI DEN: Platinum

=== Extended plays ===
Title	Details
Phase Five	Released: 21 August 2020; Label: All Chemistry

=== Singles ===
==== As lead artist ====
Title	Year	Peak chart positions	Certifications	Album
Title	Year	DEN	Certifications	Album
"Puppy Dog Eyes"	2016	—		Non-album singles
"Grayzone"	2019	—		Non-album singles
"My Chemistry"	2019	—		Non-album singles
"Rip Your Shirt"	2020	—		Non-album singles
"Dirty"	2020	—		Non-album singles
"Why Don't You"	2020	—		Phase Five
"Lost All Hope"	2020	—		Phase Five
"No.1"	2020	—		Phase Five
"Love Me Right"	2020	—		Phase Five
"The Other Side"	2020	—		Phase Five
"Run"	2021	—		Non-album singles
"Feels So Loud"	2021	—		Non-album singles
"Personal Letters"	2021	—		Non-album singles
"Singing Mars a Lullaby"	2021	—		Non-album singles
"God's Work"	2022	—		Non-album singles
"Terrier"	2022	6	IFPI DEN: Platinum	Bænkevarmer
"Jeg ka' rigtig godt li' dig" (featuring Andreas Odbjerg)	2023	2	IFPI DEN: 3× Platinum	Bænkevarmer
"Mellem mor og far"	2023	—		Non-album singles
"Det' bare sådan det ser ud"	2024	—		Non-album singles
"Min ven"	2024	—		Non-album singles
"Bedre held mæste gang" (with Ella Augusta)	2025	—		Non-album singles
"Vintermiraklet (Valdes jul)"	2025	37		Non-album singles
"En anden planet"	2026	—		Non-album singles
"Den her sang (handler ik'om dig)"	2026	—		Non-album singles
"Regnbuer" (featuring Kedde)	2026	—		Non-album singles
"—" denotes a recording that did not chart or was not released in that territory.

==== As featured artist ====
Title	Year	Peak chart positions	Certifications	Album
Title	Year	DEN	Certifications	Album
"Stimulanser" (Tobias Rahim featuring Ida Laurberg)	2021	—	IFPI DEN: Gold	Non-album singles
"God dag" (with Andreas Odbjerg and Lamin)	2024	—	IFPI DEN: Gold	Non-album singles
"Satellitter" (Søn featuring Ida Laurberg)	2026	—		Non-album singles

== Awards and nominations ==
Year	Award	Category	Recipient(s)	Result	Ref.
2023	P3 Guld	Listener Hit	"Terrier"	Nominated	
2023	Danish Music Awards	New Danish Name of the Year	Laurberg	Won	
2023	Danish Music Awards	Danish Hit of the Year	"Jeg ka' rigtig godt li' dig" (featuring Andreas Odbjerg)	Won	
2024	EchoPrisen	Hit of the Year	"Jeg ka' rigtig godt li' dig" (featuring Andreas Odbjerg)	Nominated	
2024	GAFFA Awards	Danish Hit of the Year	"Jeg ka' rigtig godt li' dig" (featuring Andreas Odbjerg)	Nominated	
2024	Danish Music Awards	New Danish Name of the Year	Laurberg	Nominated	
