= Vulkanø =

2025 studio album by Tobias Rahim

Studio album by Tobias Rahim
- Released: 19 September 2025
- Genre: Pop
- Length: 84:06
- Label: Sony Music Denmark
- Producers: Tobias Rahim; Oliver Cilwik; Arto Eriksen; Kailash Wlliams Chatterjee; Frederik Nordsø; Mingus Eriksen; Fridolin Nordsø; Martin René

Tobias Rahim chronology
Når sjælen kaster op (2022)	Vulkanø (2025)

Singles from Vulkanø
- 1. "Bellevue" Released: 23 February 2024; 2. "Dark Room" Released: 24 May 2024; 3. "Jylland" Released: 30 August 2024; 4. "Regntid" Released: 7 February 2025; 5. "Lys (Illumineret)" Released: 28 March 2025; 6. "Karavane (Lanigligfortældig)" Released: 4 April 2025; 7. "Tæt på" Released: 9 May 2025; 8. "Den værste" Released: 30 May 2025; 9. "Ingen ying uden yang" Released: 8 August 2025

Vulkanø is the third studio album by the Danish singer Tobias Rahim. The album was released on 19 September 2025 by Sony Music Denmark.

== Release and reception ==
Rahim announced Vulkanø via Instagram on 15 September 2025, four days before the album's scheduled release. In the announcement, Rahim also announced he was donating 1,000,000 kr. to Behandlingscenter Tjele, an addiction treatment center. The donation made to the addiction treatment center came from the marketing budget initially planned for the album's release, as well as his own money. The first single from the album, "Elsker når du smiler", was released on 16 September. Rahim stated the song was about a close friend who was "lost" to addiction.

Prior to the 19 September release, Vulkanø was limited to a vinyl record release. Upon the album's full release, it received mixed reviews. It received three-of-six stars from Ekstra Bladet and Gaffa, with four-of-six stars from Jyllands-Posten, Politiken, and Soundvenue.

The album reached number one on the Hitlisten charts on 1 October 2025. In total, nine songs from the album reached the Hitlisten charts, with "Bellevue" and "Dark Room" each achieving number one during their initial releases in 2024. The two songs have achieved triple-platinum and double-platinum certifications from IFPI Danmark respectively.

== Track listing ==
No.	Title	Lyrics	Producer(s)	Length
1.	"Tillykke m Livet"	Tobias Rahim	Oliver Cilwik	2:43
2.	"Nogen spiller tennis"	Rahim	Arto Eriksen; Kailash Wlliams Chatterjee	3:15
3.	"Elsker når du smiler"	Rahim; Loke Deph	A. Eriksen; Frederik Nordsø	3:42
4.	"Landsbypige fra Bolivia"	Rahim	Cilwik	2:53
5.	"Sygeplejerske på nattevagt" (featuring Molly Sandén and Delara)	Rahim; Sandén; Delara	A. Eriksen; Fre. Nordsø	3:00
6.	"Ingen Yin uden Yang" (featuring Mille)	Rahim; Mille	Cilwik	2:53
7.	"Showbiz$z"	Rahim; A. Eriksen; Frederik Nordsø; Mingus Eriksen	A. Eriksen; Fre. Nordsø; M. Eriksen	4:14
8.	"Bunden er et springbræt" (featuring Kesi)	Rahim; Kesi	A. Eriksen	3:21
9.	"Dark Room" (featuring Icekiid)	Rahim; icekiid; A. Eriksen; Nordsø; Fridolin Nordsø	A. Eriksen; Fre. Nordsø; Fri. Nordsø	2:52
10.	"Den Værste" (featuring Lamin)	Rahim; Lamin	A. Eriksen	2:39
11.	"Jylland"	Rahim	Rahim; A. Eriksen; Fre. Nordsø	3:11
12.	"Submissive" (featuring Zuloo)	Rahim; Zuloo	A. Eriksen	2:48
13.	"Tæt på" (featuring Delara)	Rahim; Delara; Cilwik; Synne Vorkinn	Cilwik	2:17
14.	"Et sted i universet"	Rahim; A. Eriksen; Fri. Nordsø	A. Eriksen; Fre. Nordsø; Fri. Nordsø	2:35
15.	"Lys (illumineret)"	Rahim; Chatterjee	A. Eriksen	2:50
16.	"Karavane (lamigligfortældig)" (featuring Marwan)	Rahim; Marwan; Chatterjee	A. Eriksen	3:13
17.	"Drenge i en flok"	Rahim; A. Eriksen; Fri. Nordsø; Chatterjee	A. Eriksen; Fri. Nordsø	5:07
18.	"Sang til Mor"	Rahim; A. Eriksen; Fri. Nordsø	A. Eriksen; Fre. Nordsø	6:02
19.	"Bellevue" (featuring D1MA)	Rahim; D1MA; A. Eriksen; Fri. Nordsø; Martin René	A. Eriksen; René; Fri. Nordsø	2:32
20.	"Regntid" (featuring Kabusa Oriental Choir)	Rahim; Chatterjee	A. Eriksen	3:35
21.	"Tórshavn rave"	Rahim; A. Eriksen	A. Eriksen	3:47
22.	"Vulkanø"	Rahim; A. Eriksen; Fre. Nordsø	A. Eriksen; Fre. Nordsø	5:36
Total length:				84:06

== Charts ==
=== Weekly charts ===
Weekly chart performance
Chart (2025–2026)	Peak position
Danish Albums (Hitlisten)	1
Norwegian Albums (VG-lista)	97

=== Year-end charts ===
Year-end chart performance
Chart	Year	Position
Danish Albums (Hitlisten)	2025	98

== Certifications ==
Certifications
Region	Certification	Certified units/sales
Denmark (IFPI Danmark)	Platinum	20,000^{‡}
^{*} Sales figures based on certification alone.^{‡} Sales+streaming figures based on certification alone.
