= Den danske sommer =

2026 single by Tobias Rahim

Single by Tobias Rahim featuring Birthe Kjær
- Released: 10 April 2026
- Length: 2:25
- Label: Os Der Følger Flode
- Songwriters: Tobias Rahim; Helena Gao; Jakob Torp Littauer
- Producer: Jakob Torp Littauer

Music video
- "Den danske sommer" on YouTube

"Den danske sommer" (transl. The Danish summer) is a song by Danish singer Tobias Rahim featuring Birthe Kjær. The song, released on 10 April 2026, spent three-weeks on the Danish top 40 charts at number one. It has also been Gold certification by IFPI Danmark.

== Release and reception ==
Tobias Rahim stated he first got the idea for the song, he quickly got the idea to include Birthe Kjær. Rahim's record label reached out to Kjær after Rahim had written the song. After initially declining Rahim's offer, Kjær agreed to feature in the song after hearing it, stating she couldn't get the song out of her head. Rahim announced the song via Instagram on 9 April 2026 with a promotional photo of Kjær and himself.

The response to "Den danske sommer" was generally positive, with some critics praising its departure from Tobias Rahim's established formula for summer hits and the collaboration with Kjær. In a review for Soundvenue, Rasmus Weirup described the song as "something entirely different" from Rahim's previous summer anthems, characterizing it as a "melancholic and infinitely nostalgic ode" to the fleeting nature of the Danish summer. Weirup also praised Kjær's contribution, writing that the dansktop singer was "really well cast" as Rahim's duet partner, with her reflective performance providing an effective contrast to Rahim's youthful anticipation of the season. Reviewers also highlighted the collaboration from the two artists as an unexpected cross-generational pairing.

Following the song's release, it was considered to be one of the biggest hits of the summer by several media outlets. The song became a number-one hit in Denmark, and has since achieved Gold certification from IFPI Danmark.

The pair of Rahim and Kjær have since gone on to perform the song live on several occasions, including X Factor's season 19 finale and on the Orange Stage during Rahim's performance at Roskilde Festival.

== Personnel ==
Credits are adapted from the song's media notes.

- Tobias Rahim – vocals, lyrics
- Birthe Kjær – vocals
- Helena Gao – choir, composer, lyrics
- Jakob Torp Littauer – synthesiser, bass, piano, guitar, drums, composer, lyrics, producer
- Vibe Wingstrand – choir
- Johanna Bechsgaard – choir
- Maria Leeson – choir
- Anders Schumann – mastering engineer

== Charts ==
=== Weekly charts ===
Weekly chart performance
Chart (2026)	Peak position
Danish Tracks (Hitlisten)	1

== Certifications ==
Certifications for "Den danske sommer"
Region	Certification	Certified units/sales
Denmark (IFPI Danmark)	Gold	45,000^{‡}
^{*} Sales figures based on certification alone.^{^} Shipments figures based on certification alone.^{‡} Sales+streaming figures based on certification alone.

== See also ==
- List of number-one hits of 2026 (Denmark)
