= Flyvende Faduma =

2022 single by Tobias Rahim

Single by Tobias Rahim

from the album Når sjælen kaster op
- Released: 5 August 2022
- Genre: Pop
- Length: 3:18
- Label: Sony Music Denmark
- Songwriters: Tobias Rahim; Arto Eriksen; Sallysongs; Felix Diarra; Frederik Nordsø
- Producers: Arto Eriksen; Frederik Nordsø

Music video
- "Flyvende Faduma" on YouTube

"Flyvende Faduma" (lit. 'Flying Faduma') is a song by the Danish singer Tobias Rahim from his second studio album, Når sjælen kaster op. The song was written by Rahim, Arto Eriksen, Ivalo Nordsø, Sallysongs, and Felix Diarra. Eriksen and Nordsø also served as the song's producers. The song was first released as a single on 5 August 2022.

Since its release, "Flyvende Faduma" has spent eight weeks at number-one on the Danish charts between 2022 and 2023, and has been certified Platinum five times. The song was also included in Hitlisten's Top 100 tracks for 2022, 2023, and 2024.

== Release and reception ==
"Flyvende Faduma" released as a single by Rahim on 5 August 2022 by Sony Music Denmark. It was Rahim's fifth single release in 2022. As with Rahim's other singles in 2022, "Flyvende Faduma" received positive reviews. Soundvenue described the song as catchy with considerable sing-along potential and an uplifting message, comparing the composition to that of children's songs. The song was described as telling the story of two school children, Tobias and Faduma, and was called an "an anti-racist fable about inclusion."

With Rahim's other singles of 2022, "Flyvende Faduma" achieved success within Denmark. Following its release, "Flyvende Faduma" became Rahim's fourth number-one hit of 2022. During 2022, when Rahim's music held the number-one spot on the Hitlisten charts for 20 consecutive weeks, "Flyvende Faduma" was the third different song included in that streak. Rahim and the song were dethroned in September 2022 when it dropped to number-two behind "I'm Good (Blue)" by David Guetta and Bebe Rexha.

A music video for the song was released on 8 September. Soundvenue described it as more understated and simple than several of Rahim's preceding music videos, featuring Rahim and his band performing in front of a water tower near a motorway.

The song has gone on to receive certified Platinum five times by IFPI Danmark. On Hitlisten's Top 100 tracks of 2022, "Flyvende Faduma" appeared on the list at number 11 for 2022. It rose the following year to number four.

== Personnel ==
Credits are adapted from the media notes on Når sjælen kaster op.

- Tobias Rahim – vocals, lyrics, composer
- Arto Eriksen – drums, keyboards, composer, producer
- Frederik Nordsø – guitar
- Kristjan Rafn – synthesizer
- Ivalo Nordsø – background vocals, lyrics
- Fridolon Nordsø Schjoldan – bass
- Sallysongs – lyrics
- Felix Diarra – lyrics
- Jesper Vivid Vestergaard – mastering engineer, mixing engineer
- Lasse Joen Sørensen – mastering engineer, mixing engineer

== Charts ==
=== Weekly charts ===
Weekly chart performance
Chart (2022–2026)	Peak position
Danish Tracks (Hitlisten)	1

=== Year-end charts ===
Year-end chart performance
Chart	Year	Position
Danish Albums (Hitlisten)	2022	11
Danish Albums (Hitlisten)	2023	4
Danish Albums (Hitlisten)	2024	50

== Certifications ==
Certifications for "Flyvende Faduma"
Region	Certification	Certified units/sales
Denmark (IFPI Danmark)	5× Platinum	450,000^{‡}
^{‡} Sales+streaming figures based on certification alone.

== See also ==
- List of number-one hits of 2022 (Denmark)
- List of number-one hits of 2023 (Denmark)
