= Når sjælen kaster op =

2022 studio album by Tobias Rahim

Studio album by Tobias Rahim
- Released: 21 October 2022
- Genre: Pop
- Length: 44:15
- Label: Sony Music Denmark
- Producers: Arto Eriksen; Hennedub; Frederick Nordsø; Jacob Brøndlund; Søren Bech

Tobias Rahim chronology
National Romantik 2021 (2020)	Når sjælen kaster op (2022)	¿Happy Ending? (2023)

Singles from Når sjælen kaster op
- 1. "Stor mand" Released: 13 August 2021; 2. "Mucki bar" Released: 11 February 2022; 3. "Når mænd græder" Released: 6 May 2022; 4. "Feberdrømmer xx Dubai" Released: 3 June 2022; 5. "Bums for eliten" Released: 24 June 2022; 6. "Flyvende Faduma" Released: 5 August 2022

Når sjælen kaster op is the second studio album by the Danish singer Tobias Rahim. The album was released on 21 October 2022 by Sony Music Denmark. The album was nominated for multiple awards within the Danish music industry, as well as multiple songs. The album reached number one on the Hitlisten charts, a position it held for a total of 17 weeks.

== Release and reception ==
Når sjælen kaster op was released on 21 October 2022. The last track titled "Alive Alive Alive" was witheld from publication initially, with Rahim stating it would "be released if the world is ready". The song was later released on streaming platforms on 6 January 2023.

The album received generally positive reviews, with Gaffa and Politiken each giving the album six-of-six stars in their reviews. Gaffa writer Adam Bouttai called the album "a masterpiece of modern Danish pop music". Jyllands-Posten, Ekstra Bladet, and Soundvenue all gave the album four-of-six stars. By December, the album was named as one of the 10 best albums of 2022 by Politiken.

As of April 2026, the album has been certified Platinum seven times by IFPI Danmark. A total of 13 songs have reached the Hitlisten charts, with four separate songs achieving number one. "Stor mand", featuring Andreas Odbjerg, has achieved Platinum certification nine times.

== Accolades ==
Når sjælen kaster op saw a number of awards and nominations for Rahim, including nominations for Danish songwriter of the year from the Danish Music Awards, and two separate awards from the GAFFA Awards in 2023. "Stor Mand" won the Listener Hit at the 2021 at DR P3's Guld awards in November 2021, and Hit of the Year at the 2022 Zulu Awards. Another song from the album, "Mucki Bar" also received multiple nominations and award wins between 2022 and 2023.

Year	Award	Category	Recipient(s)	Result	Ref.
2021	P3 Guld	Listener Hit	"Stor mand" (Tobias Rahim feat. Andreas Odbjerg)	Won	
2022	Danish Music Awards	Danish Radio Hit of the Year	"Mucki bar"	Nominated	
2022	Danish Music Awards	Danish Streaming Hit of the Year	"Mucki bar"	Won	
2022	Danish Music Awards	Danish Streaming Hit of the Year	"Feberdrømmer xx Dubai"	Nominated	
2022	Danish Music Awards	Danish Songwriter of the Year	Når sjælen kaster op	Nominated	
2022	P3 Guld	Listener Hit	"Mucki bar"	Nominated	
2022	GAFFA Awards	Danish Hit of the Year	"Stor Mand" (Tobias Rahim feat. Andreas Odbjerg)	Nominated	
2022	Zulu Awards	Hit of the Year	"Stor Mand" (Tobias Rahim feat. Andreas Odbjerg)	Won	
2022	Zulu Awards	Duo of the Year	Tobias Rahim and Andreas Odbjerg	Nominated	
2023	EchoPrisen	Hit of the Year	"Feberdrømmer xx Dubai"	Won	
2023	GAFFA Awards	Danish Release of the Year	Når sjælen kaster op	Nominated	
2023	GAFFA Awards	Pop Release of the Year	Når sjælen kaster op	Nominated	
2023	GAFFA Awards	Danish Hit of the Year	"Mucki bar"	Won	

== Track listing ==
No.	Title	Lyrics	Producer(s)	Length
1.	"07 | 6A"	Tobias Rahim	Arto Eriksen	2:00
2.	"Feberdrømmer xx Dubai"	Rahim	Eriksen	3:41
3.	"Alene på staden"	Rahim	Eriksen; Hennedub	3:09
4.	"Taber mig i dig. føler vi ku vinde"	Rahim	Eriksen	3:07
5.	"Kurder u København" (featuring ZK & Luna Ersahin)	Rahim; ZK; Luna Ersahin; Alexander Palm	Eriksen	4:19
6.	"Makeup"	Rahim; Andreas Odbjerg	Eriksen	3:05
7.	"Udfylder Tomhed"	Rahim	Eriksen	1:28
8.	"Ozonlag a energi" (featuring Niels Brandt)	Rahim	Eriksen; Frederick Nordsø	3:26
9.	"Når mænd græder"	Rahim	Eriksen; Nordsø; Jacob Brøndlund; Søren Bech	3:30
10.	"Mucki bar"	Rahim	Eriksen	2:59
11.	"Flyvende Faduma"	Rahim; SALLYSONGS; Felix Diarra; Nordsø	Eriksen; Nordsø	3:18
12.	"Bums for eliten" (featuring Artigeardit)	Rahim; Artigeardit	Eriksen	3:10
13.	"Skæbnen elsker os."	Rahim	Eriksen	2:17
14.	"Stor mand" (featuring Andreas Odbjerg)	Rahim; Odbjerg; Eriksen	Eriksen; Nordsø	3:02
15.	"Alive//Interlude"	Marco "Brando" Rejaie	Eriksen	1:45
16.	"Alive Alive Alive"	Rahim	Eriksen	4:20
Total length:				44:15

== Charts ==
=== Weekly charts ===
Weekly chart performance
Chart (2022–2025)	Peak position
Danish Albums (Hitlisten)	1

=== Year-end charts ===
Year-end chart performance
Chart	Year	Position
Danish Albums (Hitlisten)	2022	12
Danish Albums (Hitlisten)	2023	1
Danish Albums (Hitlisten)	2024	8
Danish Albums (Hitlisten)	2025	19

== Certifications ==
Certifications
Region	Certification	Certified units/sales
Denmark (IFPI Danmark)	7× Platinum	140,000^{‡}
^{*} Sales figures based on certification alone.^{‡} Sales+streaming figures based on certification alone.
