= Mucki bar =

2022 single by Tobias Rahim

Single by Tobias Rahim

from the album Når sjælen kaster op
- Released: 11 February 2022
- Genre: Pop
- Length: 2:59
- Label: Sony Music Denmark
- Songwriters: Tobias Rahim; Arto Eriksen
- Producer: Arto Eriksen

Music video
- "Mucki bar" on YouTube

"Mucki bar" is a song by the Danish singer Tobias Rahim from his second studio album, Når sjælen kaster op. The song was written and composed by Rahim. Arto Eriksen served as the song's producer, while also assisting in the song's composition. It was initially released as a single on 11 February 2022.

Since its release, "Mucki bar" spent 11 weeks at number-one on the Danish charts and has been certified Platinum five times.

== Release and reception ==
As a single, "Mucki bar" released on 11 February 2022. The song was later included on Rahim's 2022 album Når sjælen kaster op. The song was a continuation of Rahim's success on the Hitlisten charts following the release of "Stor mand" in months prior, both of which helped the album's success.

On the Hitlisten charts, "Mucki bar" reached the top position, becoming Rahim's second number-one single of 2022. The song continued to remain the chart for a period after its decline from number-one, and became finished second on Hitlisten's Top 100 tracks of 2022. It was first certified Platinum by IFPI Danmark during its time on the Danish charts, and later achieved the Platinum certification five times.

Soundvenue stated that Rahim had accumulated a large amount of recognisable hit songs when discussing his live performances, including "Mucki bar". Producer Arto Eriksen later discussed the song, stating he knew it would be a hit prior to its release and never doubted its success. The song was later included on Hitlisten's Top 100 tracks of 2023, falling to number 28.

== Accolades ==
"Mucki bar" received industry recognition at the Danish Music Awards 2022, where it won the award for Danish Streaming Hit of the Year, and was nominated for Danish Radio Hit of the Year. The song's second award came in 2023 at the GAFFA Awards, where it won Danish Hit of the Year.

| Year | Award | Category | Recipient(s) | Result | Ref. |
|---|---|---|---|---|---|
| 2022 | Danish Music Awards | Danish Radio Hit of the Year | "Mucki bar" | Nominated | |
| 2022 | Danish Music Awards | Danish Streaming Hit of the Year | "Mucki bar" | Won | |
| 2022 | P3 Guld | Listener Hit | "Mucki bar" | Nominated | |
| 2023 | GAFFA Awards | Danish Hit of the Year | "Mucki bar" | Won | |

== Personnel ==
Credits are adapted from the media notes on Når sjælen kaster op.

- Tobias Rahim – vocals, lyrics, composer
- Arto Eriksen – composer, producer
- Frederik Nordsø – guitar
- Fridolin Nordsø – keyboards
- Jesper Vivid Vestergaard – mastering engineer, mixing engineer
- Lasse Joen Sørensen – mixing engineer

== Charts ==
=== Weekly charts ===
Weekly chart performance
| Chart (2022–2026) | Peak position |
|---|---|
| Danish Tracks (Hitlisten) | 1 |

=== Year-end charts ===
Year-end chart performance
| Chart | Year | Position |
|---|---|---|
| Danish Tracks (Hitlisten) | 2022 | 2 |
| Danish Tracks (Hitlisten) | 2023 | 28 |

== Certifications ==
Certifications for "Mucki bar"
| Region | Certification | Certified units/sales |
|---|---|---|
| Denmark (IFPI Danmark) | 5× Platinum | 450,000^{‡} |
^{‡} Sales+streaming figures based on certification alone.

== See also ==
- List of number-one hits of 2022 (Denmark)
