= D1MA =

Danish rapper and singer

- Also known as: Denmark
- Genres: Hip hop; pop; electronic
- Occupations: Rapper; singer
- Years active: 2022–present
- Labels: 7OUMA Records; Universal Music Denmark

D1MA (pronounced "Dima") is a pseudonymous Danish rapper and singer. His real name and identity remain unknown due to his appearance which includes a mask covering his head and neck, and his reluctance to speak of his personal life. His debut album, EV1GT&ALT1D, reached number one on the Danish top 40 charts and achieved double-platinum certification from IFPI Danmark. Since making his debut in 2022, he has been nominated for several major awards in the Danish music industry.

== Career ==
Alongside Swedish rapper VC Barre, D1MA released his debut single on 4 March 2022 entitled "Come My Way". The song was met with praise by music critics, noting a strong debut for the rapper. He released his solo debut single entitled "Drøm mig væk" several weeks later on 1 April. The song reached the Danish top 40 charts at number 35 in the following week. By July, it reached its peak at number four, where it stayed for five weeks. The song achieved gold certification from IFPI Danmark on in 21 June 2022. At the end of 2022, he was nominated for New Danish Name of the Year at the Danish Music Awards.

D1MA released his debut studio album, EV1GT&ALT1D, on 16 March 2023. The album went to number one on the Danish charts. The production of the album also received a nomination for Danish Producer of the Year.

On 23 February 2024, Tobias Rahim released a track featuring D1MA, entitled "Bellevue". The following week, the track debuted on the Danish top 40 charts at number one, a position it held for nine consecutive weeks. The song saw the duo nominated for 2024's Listener Hit at that year's P3 Guld. Despite not winning the award, the song did reach double-platinum certification. The song finished 2024 as one of the top 10 most streamed songs in Denmark, sitting at number eight. He released his first extended play, entitled 7, on 11 October 2024.

Ahead of his performance at the 2025 Roskilde Festival, D1MA announced his new EP on 1 July, releasing the single "Losses". The EP, entitled N1YA, was released in its entirety two days later on 3 July.

=== Live performances ===
D1MA announced his first headlining tour in 2023, which was named after the album EV1GT&ALT1D. The tour led him to traveling to several major Danish cities, including Aalborg, Aarhus, Copenhagen, and Odense. The tour also included stops at several music festivals including Roskilde. He made his first live performance of the year at Jelling Music Festival in May to a crowd of approximately 1,200 people. Despite the concert being interrupted early due to the crowd breaking the separating fence, his performance was praised by fans and critics and was ultimately able to finish the concert.

Expected to appear at NorthSide Festival in Aarhus in 2024, the festival organizers announced D1MA's cancelation on 31 January, stating that he was canceling all shows for the remainder of the year.

In January 2025, Roskilde Festival announced their lineup for the 2025 festival, announcing D1MA would appear on the Orange Stage, the festival's largest stage. His performance was once again met with favourable reviews from music critics. Despite Roskilde announcing it would be his only performance of 2025, D1MA appeared at Smukfest on 11 August.

== Public image and identity ==
Since his debut, D1MA has worn a mask and has kept both his identity and personal life private. In a 2022 interview, he declined to state his name but did acknowledge he was "over 21 years old". Internet speculation emerged that he had once released music under the pseudonym "Grizzy", though nothing was confirmed. He has stated that whether his personal identity is known or not, he would continue to perform with the mask, calling it an artistic symbol.

== Discography ==
=== Studio albums ===
Title	Details	Peak chart positions	Certifications
Title	Details	DEN	Certifications
Ev1gt&alt1d	Released: 16 March 2023; Labels: 7OUMA Records, Universal Music Denmark	1	IFPI DEN: 3× Platinum

=== Extended plays ===
Title	Details	Peak chart positions	Certifications
Title	Details	DEN	Certifications
7	Released: 10 October 2024; Labels: 7OUMA Records, Universal Music Denmark	2	IFPI DEN: Platinum
N1ya	Released: 3 July 2025; Labels: 7OUMA Records, Universal Music Denmark	7	IFPI DEN: Platinum

=== Singles ===
Year	Title	Peak chart positions	Certifications	Album
Year	Title	DEN	Certifications	Album
"Come My Way" (D1MA X VC Barre)	2022	—		Non-album singles
"Drøm mig væk"	2022	4	IFPI DEN: 4× Platinum	Non-album singles
"Don't Phase Me"	2022	15	IFPI DEN: 2× Platinum	Non-album singles
"No Love"	2022	18	IFPI DEN: Gold	Non-album singles
"Kenti Hayati"	2022	17	IFPI DEN: Gold	Non-album singles
"Baglæns"	2022	37		Non-album singles
"Tom Indeni" (Caroline Dubois feat. D1MA)	2022	—	IFPI DEN: Platinum	Non-album singles
"Lidt endnu" (Medina x D1MA)	2023	4		Non-album singles
"Moonlight"	2023	2	IFPI DEN: 3× Platinum	Ev1gt&alt1d
"Forsvinder aldrig"	2023	26		Ev1gt&alt1d
"Til vi dør"	2023	24		Ev1gt&alt1d
"I Know"	2023	1	IFPI DEN: 4× Platinum	Non-album singles
"Tilfældigt" (Caroline Dubois feat. D1MA)	2023	15	IFPI DEN: 2× Platinum	Non-album singles
"Bellevue" (Tobias Rahim feat. D1MA)	2024	1	IFPI DEN: 3× Platinum	Vulkanø
"En sammen"	2024	13	IFPI DEN: Platinum	Non-album single
"Cleopatra"	2024	6	IFPI DEN: Platinum	7
"Feel Alive"	2024	9		7
"Vågn op"	2024	22		7
"Cali Lovin'"	2024	36		7
"Natten bliver morgen"	2025	9	IFPI DEN: Platinum	N1ya
"m3aya v1 (sammen)"	2025	35		Non-album singles
"Blessed"	2026	7		Non-album singles
"Spøgelse"	2026	10		Non-album singles
"Splittet til atomer"	2026	24		Non-album singles
"PPC" (featuring Gilli)	2026	4		Non-album singles
"Mig&mine"	2026	17		Non-album singles
"Family"	2026	37		Non-album singles
"—" denotes a recording that did not chart or was not released in that territory.

== Awards and nominations ==
Year	Award	Category	Recipient(s)	Result	Ref.
2022	Danish Music Awards	New Danish Name of the Year	D1MA	Nominated	
2022	P3 Guld	Listener Hit	"Drøm mig væk"	Nominated	
2023	Danish Music Awards	Danish Album of the Year	Ev1gt&alt1d	Nominated	
2023	Danish Music Awards	Danish Soloist of the Year	D1MA	Nominated	
2023	Danish Music Awards	Danish Live Name of the Year	D1MA	Nominated	
2023	EchoPrisen	Hit of the Year	"Drøm mig væk"	Nominated	
2023	P3 Guld	The Talent	D1MA	Nominated	
2023	P3 Guld	Listener Hit	"I KNOW"	Nominated	
2024	EchoPrisen	Hit of the Year	"Moonlight"	Nominated	
2024	GAFFA Awards	New Danish Name of the Year	D1MA	Nominated	
2024	P3 Guld	Listener Hit	"Bellevue" (Tobias Rahim feat. D1MA)	Nominated	
2025	GAFFA Awards	Danish Hip-Hop Release of the Year	7	Nominated	
2025	P3 Guld	The Prize	D1MA	Nominated	
