= Andreas Odbjerg =

Danish singer and songwriter (born 1987)

- Born: Andreas Ferguen Dyre Odbjerg; 5 December 1987 (age 38); Odense, Denmark
- Genres: Pop
- Occupations: Singer; songwriter
- Years active: 2012–present
- Label: Universal Music Denmark
- Spouse: Sabrina Ferguen (m. 2023)
- Website: aodbjerg.dk

Andreas Ferguen Dyre Odbjerg (born 5 December 1987) is a Danish singer and songwriter. Born in Odense, he has released two studio albums and has had two number one songs, alongside multiple awards from the Danish Music Awards as both a performer and songwriter. In 2024, he was the most played artist on the radio in Denmark.

== Career ==
Odbjerg was introduced to acting and singing by his mother. He was kicked out of high school, and later dropped out of several programs after trying to return. His first appearance as a singer happened during X Factor in 2009, though he never made it to the rounds which appeared on TV. Following his exit from the show, he spent time homeless and relying on wedding performances and jobs at cafes in his hometown of Odense. He appeared three years later in 2012 on Voice – Danmarks største stemme, finishing in second place. His finish earned him a record deal with the Rhythmic Music Conservatory, a music conservatoire based in Copenhagen. It was there that he was introduced to Moses Fiellau, where the two formed the duo of Andreas. Together they released the three extended plays, including "Gazeller" which gained frequent radio play. Odbjerg left to pursue a solo career in 2018, releasing the single "Icemoneyassbitch".

In 2019, Odbjerg released the song "Føler mig selv 100" from his EP Lance Armstrong. The song went on to peak at number 29 in the Danish charts, and number three on the Danish airplay chart in 2021. It ended 2020 as one of the top 100 most-streamed songs of the year. His third track from the same EP, "Penge ind penge ud", was named as P3's Uundgåelige.

Tobias Rahim's song "Stor mand", which featured Odbjerg, became a hit in Denmark during 2021, with the IFPI Denmark giving it 8× Platinum certification. The song also earned the duo several nominations, including the 2022 Zulu Awards where it won Hit of the Year. It was also nominated at that year's GAFFA Awards, though it lost to Odbjerg's solo track "I morgen er der også en dag".

In 2024, Odbjerg was the most played Danish artist on the radio, with his song "Benny" finishing at number one. His album Un hommage was advertised in Times Square, while his song with Ida Laurberg entitled "Jeg ka' rigtig godt li' dig" led to an award win at the 2022 Danish Music Awards for Danish Hit of the Year. In addition to performing the song at several festivals including Roskilde Festival, the song was certified double-platinum by the IFPI and was nominated for several more awards at EchoPrisen and the GAFFA Awards.

=== Songwriting ===
Odbjerg has written songs for or with a number of different artists, including Malte Ebert, Ankerstjerne, Patrick Dorgan, Gulddreng, and Drew Sycamore. He became the songwriter of a number one song when Drew Sycamore's song "45 Fahrenheit Girl" reached number one, where it stayed for five weeks. His second number one songwriting credit came in May 2021 when Ericka Jane released the song "I Say Stupid Things".

== Personal life ==
Odbjerg proposed to his longtime partner Sabrina Ferguen on Christmas Eve 2021. The couple later married in August 2023.

== Discography ==
=== Studio albums ===
Title	Details	Peak chart positions	Certifications
Title	Details	DEN	Certifications
Hjem fra fabrikken	Released: 4 March 2022; Label: Universal Music Denmark; Format: LP, CD, download	1	IFPI DEN: 3× Platinum
Un hommage	Released: 1 March 2024; Label: Universal Music Denmark; Format: LP, CD, download	2	IFPI DEN: Platinum

=== Extended plays ===
Title	Details
Lance Armstrong	Released: 2 October 2020; Label: Universal Music Denmark

=== Singles ===
Title	Year	Peak chart positions	Certifications	Album
Title	Year	DEN	Certifications	Album
"Årets defekt" (Andreas Odbjerg featuring Xander)	2012	—		Non-album singles
"Get Away" (Kongsted featuring Ida Kudo, Peaceful James and AO)	2017	—		Non-album singles
"Icemoneyassbitch"	2018	—		Non-album singles
"Anne Linnet"	2018	—		Non-album singles
"Dét helt okay"	2019	—		Non-album singles
"Tænker på dig"	2019	—		Non-album singles
"Føler mig selv 100"	2019	11	IFPI DEN: 4× Platinum	Lance Armstrong
"Min sang"	2020	—		Lance Armstrong
"Penge ind penge ud"	2020	—		Lance Armstrong
"Omvendt" (Pil and Andreas Odbjerg)	2021	—	IFPI DEN: 2× Platinum	Non-album singles
"Hjem uden klaver" (Carl Knast, Bai-D and Andreas Odbjerg)	2021	—		Non-album singles
"I morgen er der også en dag"	2021	14	IFPI DEN: 4× Platinum	Hjem fra fabrikken
"Velkommen tilbage"	2021	—	IFPI DEN: Platinum	Hjem fra fabrikken
"Stor mand" (Tobias Rahim and Andreas Odbjerg)	2021	1	IFPI DEN: 9× Platinum	Når sjælen kaster op
"God jul"	2021	22	IFPI DEN: Platinum	Non-album single
"Blev du fanget af noget?"	2022	—	IFPI DEN: Gold	Hjem fra fabrikken
"Hjem fra fabrikken"	2022	1	IFPI DEN: 4× Platinum	Hjem fra fabrikken
"Hvad skal verden med sådan en som mig?"	2022	16	IFPI DEN: Platinum	Non-album single
"Smugryger"	2023	5	IFPI DEN: 4× Platinum	Un hommage
"Jeg ka' rigtig godt li' dig" (Ida Laurberg featuring Andreas Odbjerg)	2023	2	IFPI DEN: 2× Platinum	Bænkevarmer
"Vennesangen" (Carl Knast featuring Andreas Odbjerg)	2023	—		Non-album single
"Benny"	2024	26	IFPI DEN: Platinum	Un hommage
"Den vredeste mand på jorden"	2024	26		Un hommage
"USA"	2025	35		Non-album singles
"Surprise Party"	2025	—		Non-album singles
"Jeg tror jeg elsker dig for evigt"	2026	28		Non-album singles
"Den forbandede kærlighed" (with Medina)	2026	30		Non-album singles
"—" denotes a recording that did not chart or was not released in that territory.

== Awards and nominations ==
Year	Award	Category	Recipient(s)	Result	Ref.
2021	Danish Music Awards	Danish Radio Hit of the Year	"I morgen er der også en dag"	Nominated	
2021	Danish Music Awards	Danish Songwriter of the Year	"I morgen er der også en dag"	Won	
2021	Danish Music Awards	New Danish Name of the Year	Odbjerg	Won	
2021	Danish Music Awards	New Danish Live Name of the Year	Odbjerg	Nominated	
2021	GAFFA Awards	New Danish Name of the Year	Odbjerg	Nominated	
2021	P3 Guld	Listener Hit	"Stor mand" (Tobias Rahim feat. Andreas Odbjerg)	Won	
2021	Zulu Awards	New Name of the Year	Odbjerg	Nominated	
2022	Årets Steppeulv	Song of the Year	"I morgen er der også en dag"	Won	
2022	Danish Music Awards	Danish Radio Hit of the Year	"Hjem fra fabrikken"	Won	
2022	Danish Music Awards	Danish Streaming Hit of the Year	"Hjem fra fabrikken"	Nominated	
2022	Danish Music Awards	Danish Songwriter of the Year	Hjem Fra Fabrikken	Nominated	
2022	Danish Music Awards	Danish Album of the Year	Hjem Fra Fabrikken	Nominated	
2022	Danish Music Awards	Danish Soloist of the Year	Odbjerg	Nominated	
2022	GAFFA Awards	Danish Soloist of the Year	Odbjerg	Nominated	
2022	GAFFA Awards	Danish Hit of the Year	"I morgen er der også en dag"	Won	
2022	GAFFA Awards	Danish Hit of the Year	"Stor mand" (Tobias Rahim and Andreas Odbjerg)	Nominated	
2022	GAFFA Awards	Danish Live Name of the Year	Odbjerg	Nominated	
2022	GAFFA Awards	Danish Songwriter of the Year	Odbjerg	Won	
2022	Zulu Awards	Hit of the Year	"Stor mand" (Tobias Rahim and Andreas Odbjerg)	Won	
2022	Zulu Awards	Artist of the Year	Odbjerg	Won	
2022	Zulu Awards	Duo of the Year	Andreas Odbjerg and Tobias Rahim	Nominated	
2023	Danish Music Awards	Danish Hit of the Year	"Jeg ka' rigtig godt li' dig" (Ida Laurberg feat. Andreas Odbjerg)	Won	
2023	EchoPrisen	Musician of the Year	Odbjerg	Nominated	
2023	EchoPrisen	Hit of the Year	"Hjem fra fabrikken"	Nominated	
2023	GAFFA Awards	Danish Release of the Year	Hjem fra fabrikken	Won	
2023	GAFFA Awards	Danish Soloist of the Year	Odbjerg	Won	
2023	GAFFA Awards	Danish Hit of the Year	"Hjem fra fabrikken"	Nominated	
2023	GAFFA Awards	Pop Release of the Year	Hjem fra fabrikken	Won	
2023	GAFFA Awards	Danish Live Name of the Year	Odbjerg	Nominated	
2023	GAFFA Awards	Danish Songwriter of the Year	Andreas Odbjerg, Mads Møller, Thor Nørgaard, and Daniel Thorup	Won	
2024	EchoPrisen	Hit of the Year	"Jeg ka' rigtig godt li' dig" (Ida Laurberg feat. Andreas Odbjerg)	Nominated	
2024	GAFFA Awards	Danish Hit of the Year	"Jeg ka' rigtig godt li' dig" (Ida Laurberg feat. Andreas Odbjerg)	Nominated	
2025	GAFFA Awards	Danish Release of the Year	Un hommage	Nominated	
2025	GAFFA Awards	Danish Hit of the Year	"Svært at være fantastisk" Andreas Odbjerg and Emma Sehested Høeg	Nominated	
2025	GAFFA Awards	Danish Pop Release of the Year	Un hommage	Nominated	
