= Gulddreng =

Danish musician (born 1996)

Malte Ebert
- Born: Malte Fynboe Manniche Ebert; 26 June 1994 (age 32); Vejle, Denmark
- Origin: Andkær, Denmark
- Genres: Pop, hip hop
- Occupations: Singer, rapper, comedian
- Instruments: Vocals, piano, guitar
- Years active: 2016–present
- Label: Universal Music

Malte Fynboe Manniche Ebert (born 26 June 1994), better known by his former nickname Gulddreng, is a Danish musician. His identity was unknown until the father of his host family from an exchange trip announced his name on Facebook. His name translates to "gold boy" or "golden boy" in English. As Gulddreng, Ebert was known for always wearing sunglasses, which helped to obscure his identity. His first seven singles, "Model", "Se mig nu", "Hva' så", "Drikker for lidt", "Nemt", "Guld jul" and "Ked af det", all peaked at number 1 in Denmark, with "Se mig nu", "Drikker for lidt", "Guld jul", and "Ked af det" debuting at the top spot.

On 7 September 2016 Ebert as Gulddreng also released his own official app on the App Store. The app was developed by Thorwest Development.

In September 2017, Ebert stopped using the nickname Gulddreng and began using his real name, Malte Ebert. He said he created the nickname as a "reaction to bad pop music". In June 2018, he released "Rather Be", his first single as Malte Ebert. In May 2019, he played his first concert in Vega. In 2019, he also went to Los Angeles to make songs with more international sound.

In 2026, the musician appeared in the controversial Danish television format "Alle elsker Rasmus" ("Everybody Loves Rasmus") broadcast by TV2. In the show, comedian Rasmus Wallbridge was watched and filmed over a period of months in partly private moments without his knowledge. The broadcast triggered a fierce debate in Denmark about public bullying and the ethical boundaries of media entertainment

== Discography ==
=== Albums ===
List of albums, with selected details and chart positions
Title	Details	Peak positions
Title	Details	DEN
Farvel	Released: 31 December 2017; Label: Universal; Format: Digital download	4
Alle veje fører hjem (as Malte Ebert)	Released: 2025; Label: Universal; Format: Digital download	2

=== Singles ===
List of singles, with selected chart positions and certifications
Year	Title	Peak positions	Certification
Year	Title	DEN	Certification
2016	"Model"	1	2× Platinum
2016	"Se mig nu"	1	2× Platinum
2016	"Hva' så"	1	Platinum
2016	"Drikker for lidt"	1	Platinum
2016	"Nemt"	1	Gold
2016	"Guld jul"	1	Platinum
2016	"Ked af det"	1	Gold
2017	"Utro"	3	Gold
2017	"Censor"	6	
2017	"Legende" (featuring Skinz)	7	
2017	"Lyvesangen"	4	
2017	"Ensom"	2	
2017	"UPN"	15	
2018	"Rather Be" (as Malte Ebert)	3	
2019	"Stop nu"	16	
2019	"I Could Get Used to This" (as Malte Ebert with Martin Jensen)	—	
2021	"Helt sikker"	1	
2022	"Kalde dem for du"	6	
2022	"Kun med dig"	26	
2022	"Den (u)officielle VM-sang"	5	
2022	"Julehjertets Hemmelighed" (as Malte Ebert)	1	
2023	"Mindst ondt" (as Malte Ebert with Svea S)	22	
2024	"Kongen af Danmark" (as Malte Ebert with Herrelandsholdet)	1	
2024	"Fortæl mig hvis du vil noget andet"	30	
2026	"Dét der er med livet"	32	
2026	"Vagabond" (with Mumle)	19	
