= Stor mand =

2021 single by Tobias Rahim

Single by Tobias Rahim featuring Andreas Odbjerg

from the album Når sjælen kaster op
- Released: 13 August 2021
- Genre: Pop
- Length: 3:02
- Label: Sony Music Denmark
- Songwriters: Tobias Rahim; Andreas Odbjerg
- Producers: Arto Eriksen; Fridolin Nordsø

Music video
- "Stor mand" on YouTube

"Stor mand" (lit. 'Big Man'), stylised in all caps, is a song by the Danish singer Tobias Rahim featuring Andreas Odbjerg from Rahim's second studio album, Når sjælen kaster op. The song was written by Rahim and Odbjerg, as well as Arto Eriksen. Eriksen, alongside Fridolin Nordsø, produced the song.

Since its release, the song has spent 15 weeks at number one on the Danish Hitlisten charts and has been certified platinum nine times. In 2026, it surpassed 90 million streams to become the most streamed song in Denmark.

== Release and reception ==
Upon its release, "Stor mand" received generally favourable reviews from music critics and was soon seen as one of 2021's biggest hits in Denmark. Rahim's manager was certain the song would achieve double-platinum certification. Despite the song's performance and praise, it did not reach number one on the Hitlisten charts until October, a position it held for a total of 15 weeks.

Rahim and Odbjerg performed "Stor mand" at the 2021 Danish Music Awards, and later again at Rahim's scheduled performance at the 2022 Roskilde Festival.

At the end of 2021, "Stor mand" finished at number eight on the Hitlisten charts. The following year, it rose to become the number one song for 2022. The song finished 2022 as the number one most-streamed song on Spotify within Denmark. As of December 2025, the song has been certified platinum nine times with more than 81 million streams. DR named the song as one of the top 100 Danish songs of all time, placing it at number 64.

In June 2026, it surpassed Ed Sheeran's "Shape of You" to become the most streamed song in Denmark, with 90 million combined streams across Spotify, Apple Music, and YouTube Music.

== Accolades ==
The first award nomination for "Stor mand" came in March 2022 at the annual Gaffa Awards, where it was nominated for Danish Hit of the Year. While it did not win at the Gaffa Awards, the song took the prize for Hit of the Year at the 2022 Zulu Awards. Rahim and Odbjerg were additionally nominated for Duo of the Year at the Zulu Awards, but did not win. Odbjerg himself won Songwriter of the Year at the 2021 Danish Music Awards, which included his songwriting for the song.

Year	Award	Category	Recipient(s)	Result	Ref.
2021	Danish Music Awards	Songwriter of the Year	Odbjerg (multiple songs, including "Stor mand")	Won	
2022	Gaffa Awards	Danish Hit of the Year	"Stor Mand"	Nominated	
2022	Zulu Awards	Hit of the Year	"Stor Mand"	Won	
2022	Zulu Awards	Duo of the Year	Rahim and Odbjerg	Nominated	

== Personnel ==
Credits are adapted from the media notes on Når sjælen kaster op.

- Tobias Rahim – vocals, lyrics
- Andreas Odbjerg – vocals, lyrics
- Lasse Boman –12-string guitar
- Kristjan Rafn – keyboards
- Filip Ørskov Zafirakos – piano
- Frederik Nordsø – percussion, composer, producer
- Arto Louis Eriksen – composer, lyrics, producer
- Jesper Vivid Vestergaard – mastering engineer, mixing engineer
- Lasse Joen Sørensen – mixing engineer, mastering engineer

== Charts ==
=== Weekly charts ===
Weekly chart performance
Chart (2021–2026)	Peak position
Danish Tracks (Hitlisten)	1

=== Year-end charts ===
Year-end chart performance
Chart	Year	Position
Danish Albums (Hitlisten)	2021	8
Danish Albums (Hitlisten)	2022	1
Danish Albums (Hitlisten)	2023	6
Danish Albums (Hitlisten)	2024	35
Danish Albums (Hitlisten)	2025	72

== Certifications ==
Certifications for "Stor mand"
Region	Certification	Certified units/sales
Denmark (IFPI Danmark)	9× Platinum	810,000^{‡}
^{‡} Sales+streaming figures based on certification alone.

== "Stor man" ==
"Stor man"

Single by Tobias Rahim featuring Victor Leksell
- Released: 7 July 2023
- Genre: Pop
- Length: 3:03
- Label: Sony Music Denmark
- Songwriters: Tobias Rahim; Victor Leksell
- Producers: Arto Eriksen; Fridolin Nordsø

Music video
- "Stor man" on YouTube

Another version of the song, entitled "Stor man", was released on 7 July 2023 by Rahim and Swedish singer Victor Leksell, with each artist singing in their native language. A music video was released three days later to Rahim's YouTube channel. The duo performed the song live a month later, when Leksell was performing at Smukfest where Rahim made a surprise appearance. The song reached the top 20 on both the Danish and Swedish charts.

=== Charts ===
Weekly chart performance
Chart (2023–2026)	Peak position
Danish Tracks (Hitlisten)	19
Swedish Tracks (Sverigetopplistan)	15

== See also ==
- List of number-one hits of 2021 (Denmark)
- List of number-one hits of 2022 (Denmark)
