= DR P3 =

Programming
- Language: Danish
- Format: Contemporary hit radio, news, entertainment, speech, showbiz

Ownership
- Owner: DR

History
- First air date: 1 January 1963; 63 years ago

Links
- Webcast: Web Stream; HTTP progressive Streams: (Shoutcast, 92 Kbps MP3); (Shoutcast, 192 Kbps MP3); HLS Streams: (192 Kbps AAC)
- Website: www.dr.dk/p3

DR P3 (referred to in Denmark simply as P3) is a Danish current-based hit music radio station operated by the Danish Broadcasting Corporation. It is broadcast on FM radio, DAB, and Internet radio.

== History ==
It commenced broadcasting on 1 January 1963 as Musikradio in response to the popularity of the offshore pirate radio station Radio Mercur, which had been outlawed by the Danish parliament in June 1962. In April 1966 the station became Danmarks Radio Program 3 and to Danmarks Radio P3 in 1971. P3 started stereo broadcasts in 1972.

On 1 October 2017 P3 became available on DAB+ radio when a nationwide switch-over took place.

On 5 April 2022, DR P3 merged with its sister online streaming service and former TV channel DR3.

== Music ==
The station's music features a mix of both established and emerging artists. The annual "KarriereKanonen" allows unknown musicians to breakthrough and have their songs played on P3.

Once a week, a song is selected to be P3s Uundgåelige (previously known as Ugens Uundgåelige and Powerplay) from the playlist, which means that the song is going to be rotated more frequently than any other songs on P3 this week. Some of these songs that have been sung by Danish musicians have been released on CDs in 2004 and 2005.
