= Tobias Rahim =

Danish singer and poet (born 1989)

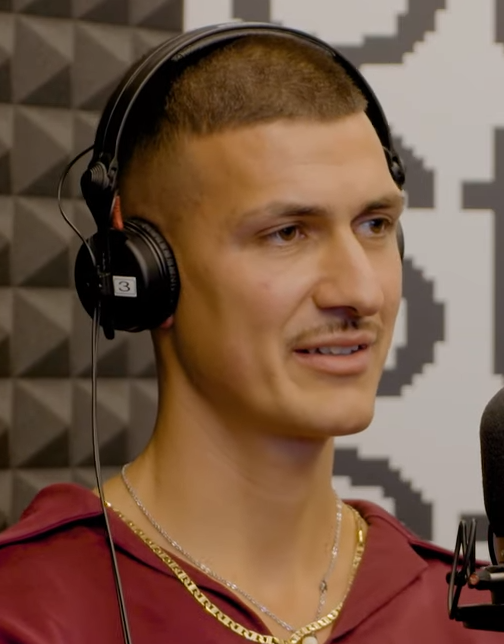
- Rahim in 2020

Background information
- Also known as: Tobias Rahim; Toby Tabu; Grande
- Born: Tobias Rahim Secilmis Hasling; 10 November 1989 (age 36); Aarhus, Denmark
- Genres: Pop; reggaeton
- Occupations: Singer; poet
- Years active: 2012–present
- Label: Sony Music
- Member of: Camilo & Grande
- Spouse: Sabrina Tekle (m. 2024; div. 2025)
- Website: www.tobiasrahim.dk

Tobias Rahim Secilmis Hasling (born 10 November 1989), also known as Toby Tabu or Grande, is a Danish singer and poet. He has achieved seven number one songs on the Danish charts, earning several awards including Danish Soloist of the Year in 2022 from the Danish Music Awards. He has also released a collection of poetry and a nude photo of himself, the latter of which is believed to be Denmark's first non-fungible token when it sold in 2021.

== Early life ==
Rahim was born in Aarhus, Denmark, to a Kurdish father and Danish mother. He was raised primarily by his mother, as his father was often absent with PTSD due to his own youth as a Kurdish freedom fighter. He has cited his upbringing as a large influence on his musical expression, notably his time living in the slums of Cali, Colombia.

== Career ==
=== Early career and debut solo album ===
Rahim's music career began in 2012 when he, alongside Camilo Fernandez, formed the reggaeton duo of Camilo & Grande. The pair released their debut EP in 2015; however, Rahim left the following year to pursue a solo career. He traveled to Ghana in 2017, where he began to release songs under the stage name of Toby Tabu. He released songs such as "Ghana Lady" and "Nana Yaa".

In 2017, under the name of Tobias Rahim, he released the self-titled solo EP Tobias Rahim. His second album entitled National Romantik 2021 was released in 2020 with tracks such as "Jesus", which received platinum certification by IFPI Danmark.

On 22 May 2021, during a concert at Vega, Rahim announced that he would put a nude photo of himself up for auction as a non-fungible token (NFT) on the crypto platform OpenSea. The photo, titled Den Neo Skandinaviske Mand (lit. 'the Neo Scandinavian Man'), was taken during a photo shoot in connection with the release of his previous album and was considered to be Denmark's first NFT. The auction concluded on 23 June 2021 when the photo was sold for 2.9 eth. His decision to release the photo was in part due to wanting to overcome his fears, including anxiety. In late 2021, he appeared on TV 2's entertainment show Stormester (the Danish version of Taskmaster).

=== Second album and awards ===
Rahim released his next studio album Når sjælen kaster op in October 2022. However, the last track titled "Alive Alive Alive" was withheld from publication, stating it would "be released if the world is ready". A month later, he debuted as a poet when his poetry collection Drømmene maler virkeligheden was published by Politikens Forlag. The collection, combining handwritten notes with full-page photographs, immediately topped the bestseller list on the Saxo online bookshop, prompting a second print run. Among the pieces is a prose poem in which Rahim recounts eating seven mini breakfast tapas dishes intended for two people. It received divided critical notices: writing in Berlingske, literary editor Søren Jacobsen Damm awarded it four stars, describing it as surprising, while Linea Maja Ernst, reviewing in Weekendavisen, described the poems as poor. Tue Andersen Nexø, writing in Dagbladet Information, noted that the closing passages showed a drift toward rhythm and rhyme more characteristic of song drafts.

On 22 September 2022, Rahim was scheduled to perform at the annual P3 Guld Awards with the song "Når Mænd Græder". However, after singing rehearsals the day before the ceremony, Rahim suffered an anxiety attack and canceled his performance. Rahim's producer, Arto Louis Eriksen, accepted Rahim's award on his behalf during the show and read a letter from Rahim out loud to explain the singer's absence. Rahim was later praised for his openness about anxiety and challenging perceived traditional masculinity.

In late 2023, streaming platform Spotify announced that Rahim's album Når sjælen kaster op was the most streamed album in Denmark for the year, and that he was the sixth most streamed Danish artist.

=== International tour and third album ===
Rahim announced the largest concert of his career in January 2025, set for September 2025 at Refshaleøen in Copenhagen. In March, he released his first rap single with the song "Lys (Illumineret)". He later announced his first foreign tour, called Neoskandinavisk Tour 2025, which includes stops in several Nordic countries.

On 15 September 2025, Rahim announced he was donating kr. 1,000,000 to Behandlingscenter Tjele, an addiction treatment center. In the same announcement, he announced his next album was scheduled to be released on 19 September. The album, Vulkanø, was previously limited to a vinyl record release. The first single released from the album on its release was "Elsker når du smiler", which Rahim stated was about a close friend who was "lost" to addiction. The donation made to the addiction treatment center came from the marketing budget initially planned for the album's release, as well as his own money. The album received mixed reviews from critics.

Rahim announced his first single of 2026 on 8 April, posting to his Instagram. The song, entitled "Den Danske Sommer", featured fellow Danish singer Birthe Kjær and was released the following day. On 22 April, the song reached number one on the Hitlisten charts. On 11 September, "Savner et menneske" was released by Norwegian rapper Marstein and Rahim.

== Personal life ==
Rahim and his partner, Sabrina Tekle, had a son together in 2021. The couple later entered into a prenuptial agreement and married in September 2024. On 8 July 2025, Tekle announced on Instagram that they had divorced.

== Discography ==
=== Studio albums ===
- National Romantik 2021 (2020)
- Når sjælen kaster op (2022)
- Vulkanø (2025)

=== Extended plays ===
- Tobias Rahim (2017)
- ¿Happy Ending? (2023)

== Awards and nominations ==
Year	Award	Category	Recipient(s)	Result	Ref.
2021	Danish Music Awards	New Danish Name of the Year	Rahim	Nominated	
2021	Danish Music Awards	New Danish Live Name of the Year	Rahim	Nominated	
2021	P3 Guld	Listener Hit	"Stor mand" (Tobias Rahim feat. Andreas Odbjerg)	Won	
2022	Danish Music Awards	Danish Soloist of the Year	Rahim	Won	
2022	Danish Music Awards	Danish Radio Hit of the Year	"Mucki bar"	Nominated	
2022	Danish Music Awards	Danish Streaming Hit of the Year	"Mucki bar"	Won	
2022	Danish Music Awards	Danish Streaming Hit of the Year	"Feberdrømmer xx Dubai"	Nominated	
2022	Danish Music Awards	Danish Songwriter of the Year	Når sjælen kaster op	Nominated	
2022	P3 Guld	P3 Prize	Rahim	Won	
2022	P3 Guld	Listener Hit	"Mucki bar"	Nominated	
2022	GAFFA Awards	Danish Hit of the Year	"Stor Mand" (Tobias Rahim feat. Andreas Odbjerg)	Nominated	
2022	Zulu Awards	Hit of the Year	"Stor Mand" (Tobias Rahim feat. Andreas Odbjerg)	Won	
2022	Zulu Awards	New Name of the Year	Rahim	Won	
2022	Zulu Awards	Duo of the Year	Tobias Rahim and Andreas Odbjerg	Nominated	
2023	EchoPrisen	Musician of the Year	Rahim	Nominated	
2023	EchoPrisen	Hit of the Year	"Feberdrømmer xx Dubai"	Won	
2023	GAFFA Awards	Danish Release of the Year	Når sjælen kaster op	Nominated	
2023	GAFFA Awards	Pop Release of the Year	Når sjælen kaster op	Nominated	
2023	GAFFA Awards	Danish Soloist of the Year	Rahim	Nominated	
2023	GAFFA Awards	Danish Hit of the Year	"Mucki bar"	Won	
2023	GAFFA Awards	Danish Songwriter of the Year	Tobias Rahim and Arto Louis Eriksen	Nominated	
2024	P3 Guld	Listener Hit	"Bellevue" (Tobias Rahim & D1MA)	Nominated	
