= Roskilde Festival 2022 =

- Dates: 26 June–2 July 2022
- Locations: Darupvej, Roskilde, Denmark
- Website: roskilde-festival.com

The Roskilde Festival 2022 was held on 26 June to 2 July 2022 in Roskilde, Denmark. The festival was headlined by The Blaze, Dua Lipa, Haim, Jada, Kacey Musgraves, Megan Thee Stallion, Post Malone, Robert Plant & Alison Krauss, The Smile, St. Vincent, The Strokes, Thomas Helmig, TLC, Tyler, the Creator.

== Headlining set lists ==
Wednesday, 29 June

Post Malone
1. "Wow."
2. "Wrapped Around Your Finger"
3. "Better Now"
4. "Saint-Tropez"
5. "Cooped Up"
6. "I Like You (A Happier Song)"
7. "Insane"
8. "Circles"
9. "Psycho"
10. "Take What You Want"
11. "I Fall Apart"
12. "Stay"
13. "Go Flex"
14. "Candy Paint"
15. "White Iverson"
16. "Sunflower"
17. "Rockstar"
18. "Congratulations"
Robert Plant & Alison Krauss
1. "Rich Woman"
2. "Quattro (World Drifts In)"
3. "Fortune Teller"
4. "The Price of Love"
5. "Rock and Roll"
6. "Please Read the Letter"
7. "Trouble with My Lover"
8. "Gone, Gone, Gone"
9. "High and Lonesome"
10. "It Don't Bother Me"
11. "The Battle of Evermore"
12. "When the Levee Breaks"
13. "Can't Let Go"

Thursday, 30 June

Dua Lipa
1. "Physical"
2. "New Rules"
3. "Love Again"
4. "Cool"
5. "Pretty Please"
6. "Break My Heart"
7. "Be the One"
8. "We're Good"
9. "Good in Bed"
10. "Fever"
11. "Boys Will Be Boys"
12. "One Kiss"
13. "Electricity"
14. "Hallucinate"
15. "Cold Heart (Pnau remix)"

Encore

16. "Future Nostalgia"
17. "Levitating"
18. "Don't Start Now"
Kacey Musgraves
1. "Star-Crossed"
2. "Good Wife"
3. "Cherry Blossom"
4. "Simple Times"
5. "Breadwinner"
6. "Golden Hour"
7. "Butterflies"
8. "Lonely Weekend"
9. "Space Cowboy"
10. "High Horse"
11. "Can't Help Falling in Love"
12. "Dreams"
13. "Justified"
14. "There is a Light"
15. "Rainbow"
16. "Slow Burn"

Friday, 1 July

Tyler, the Creator
1. "CORSO"
2. "WUSYANAME"
3. "LEMONHEAD"
4. "LUMBERBACK"
5. "Come On, Let's Go"
6. "Boredom"
7. "911"
8. "See You Again"
9. "Who Dat Boy"
10. "She"
11. "Yonkers"
12. "Tamale"
13. "I THINK"
14. "IFHY"
15. "EARFQUAKE"
16. "NEW MAGIC WAND"
17. "I THOUGHT YOU WANTED TO DANCE"
18. "RUNITUP"
Jada
1. "I'm Back"
2. "Lonely"
3. "Cue the Violins" with Coco O.
4. "s.e.x.y.o.m.g"
5. "Wild Heart" with Noah Carter
6. "Don't Say My Name and Forget It"
7. "On me"
8. Unknown song with MØ
9. "Nudes"
The Smile
1. "The Same"
2. "Thin Thing"
3. "The Opposite"
4. "Free in the Knowledge"
5. "A Hairdryer"
6. "Waving a White Flag"
7. "Colours Fly"
8. "We Don't Know What Tomorrow Brings"
9. "Skrting on the Surface"
10. "Speech Bubbles"
11. "Bodies Laughing"
12. "The Smoke"
13. "You Will Never Work in Television Again"
14. "Pana-vision"
15. "Just Eyes and Mouth"
16. "Feeling Pulled Apart by Horses"
Thomas Helmig
1. "Jeg tager imod"
2. "Det er mig der står herude og banker på"
3. "Dybt inde i mit hjerte"
4. "Treat Me Right"
5. "Vi er de eneste"
6. "Hvidt flag" with Benjamin Hav
7. "Den Den dejligste boy" / "Groovy Day" with Benjamin Hav
8. "Stupid Man"
9. "Midnat i Europa"
10. "Malaga"
11. "Fed lykke" with Ida Nielsen
12. "WE CAME 2 GET FUNKY" with Ida Nielsen
13. "Dagen efter dagen derpå"
14. "Solhverv" with Lord Siva
15. "Nu hvor du har brændt mig af"
16. "Sirenesangen"

Saturday, 2 July

The Strokes
1. "Bad Decisions"
2. "Juicebox"
3. "Automatic Stop"
4. "Hard to Explain"
5. "Reptilia"
6. "The Adults Are Talking"
7. "Selfless"
8. "What Ever Happened?"
9. "You Only Live Once"
10. "New York City Cops"
11. "Under Cover of Darkness"

Encore

12. "Eternal Summer"
13. "Last Nite"
14. "Someday"

== Lineup ==
Headline performers are listed in boldface. Artists listed from latest to earliest set times.

Orange
Wednesday, 29 June	Thursday, 30 June	Friday, 1 July	Saturday, 2 July
**Post Malone**; Drew Sycamore	**The Blaze**; **Dua Lipa**; **Megan Thee Stallion**; **Kacey Musgraves**	**Jada**; **Tyler, the Creator**; **Thomas Helmig**; Fatoumata Diawara feat. Yael Naim	**The Strokes**; **Haim**; **St. Vincent**

Arena
Wednesday, 29 June	Thursday, 30 June	Friday, 1 July	Saturday, 2 July
Biffy Clyro; **Robert Plant & Alison Krauss**; Polo G Anitta	Baby Keem; Artigeardit; Rina Sawayama; The Whitest Boy Alive; **TLC**; Sigrid; Tobias Rahim	Chvrches; H.E.R. **The Smile**; Saveus; Mitski; Amina & Sosa & Fvn	Tessa; Rae Sremmurd; Ashnikko; Jammjam feat. Dirty Loops, Mateus Asato, Rune Rask and Friends; Big Thief; Kings of Convenience

Avalon
Wednesday, 29 June	Thursday, 30 June	Friday, 1 July	Saturday, 2 July
Turnstile; Black Pumas; Cimafunk; Fontaines D.C.	Joyce; Phoebe Bridgers; Alogte Oho & His Sounds of Joy; Jimmy Eat World; Modest Mouse; Sky Ferreira; Coco O.	Etuk Ubong & the Etuk Philosophy; Jerry Cantrell; Little Simz; Alice Phoebe Lou; Arlo Parks; Africa Express Presents In C Mali; Rolo Tomassi	Iceage; Bantu Continua Uhuru Consciousness feat. Sjava; Idles; Old Man Gloom; Land of Kush; Imarhan; Erika de Casier

Apollo
Wednesday, 29 June	Thursday, 30 June	Friday, 1 July	Saturday, 2 July
Todrick Hall; Daniel Avery; Grandson	DJ Diaki & Kabeaushé; Flo Milli; N.E.Girl & Peach-Lyfe & Sugar; Chrissy	Moscow Death Brigade; UNiiQU3; Rein; AG Club	Fred again.. Shygirl; Remi Wolf; Kelly Lee Owens

Pavilion
Wednesday, 29 June	Thursday, 30 June	Friday, 1 July	Saturday, 2 July
Anna B Savage; Employed to Serve; Daniel Romano's Outfit; Good Morning	AC×DC; Kollaps; Bada; Evritiki Zygia; Canzoniere Grecanico Salentino; Cate Le Bon; DakhaBrakha; Danish String Quartet & Dreamers' Circus; Star Feminine Band	Årabrot; Teto Preto; Konvent; Ak Dan Gwang Chil; Snail Mail; Mekdes; Richard Dawson & Circle; Clarissa Connelly	Surfbort; Owenn; Converge: Bloodmoon: I Squid; Sierra Ferrell; Samba Touré; Spaza; CMAT

Mantra
Wednesday, 29 June	Thursday, 30 June	Friday, 1 July	Saturday, 2 July
Everyone You Know; Alyona Alyona; They Hate Change	Yola; Wayne Snow; Loraine James; Sam Wise; Lakha Khan's Morning Ragas	Melike Şahin; Sampa the Great; L'Rain; Sangre Nueva	BbyMutha; Che Lingo; Dafina Zeqiri; Marina Sena

Gloria
Wednesday, 29 June	Thursday, 30 June	Friday, 1 July	Saturday, 2 July
Nakibembe Xylophone Troupe; The Oceant; Kiko Dinucci	Slayyyter; MC Yallah & Debmaster & Duma; Moor Mother; Klein; John Cxnnor; Irreversible Entanglements; Yasmin Williams; Arooj Aftab	HVAD; Horsegirl; Zulu; GGGOLDDD; Slim0; Otoboke Beaver; Ydegirl; Ustad Naseeruddin Saami	Seni Reak Juarta Putra; Meuko! Meuko! & Liliane Chlela; Nadia Tehran; Ben LaMar Gay; Gordan; Hannah Jagabu; Sara Parkman; Araw N Fazaz

Rising
Sunday, 26 June	Monday, 27 June	Tuesday, 28 June
Prisma; Vola; Linn; Aysay; Joe & the Shitboys; Víík; Reveal Party	Senso; Smag På Dig Selv; Korter í flog Rigmor; Daufødt; Lucky Lo; Barbro	Blæst; Roseelu; Brimheim; Blikfang; Afskum; Gabestok; Atusji

Countdown
Sunday, 26 June	Monday, 27 June	Tuesday, 28 June
Ivan$ito; Lamin; IB101; Dayyani; Jeuru; JJ Paulo; Mina Okabe	ODZ; Debbie Sings; Eee Gee; Pind; Bbybites; Shooter Gang; Bathsheba	Soft as Snow; Cobrah; Dopha; A36; Yakuza; Musti; Varnrable
