= List of awards and nominations received by The Strokes =

The Strokes awards and nominations
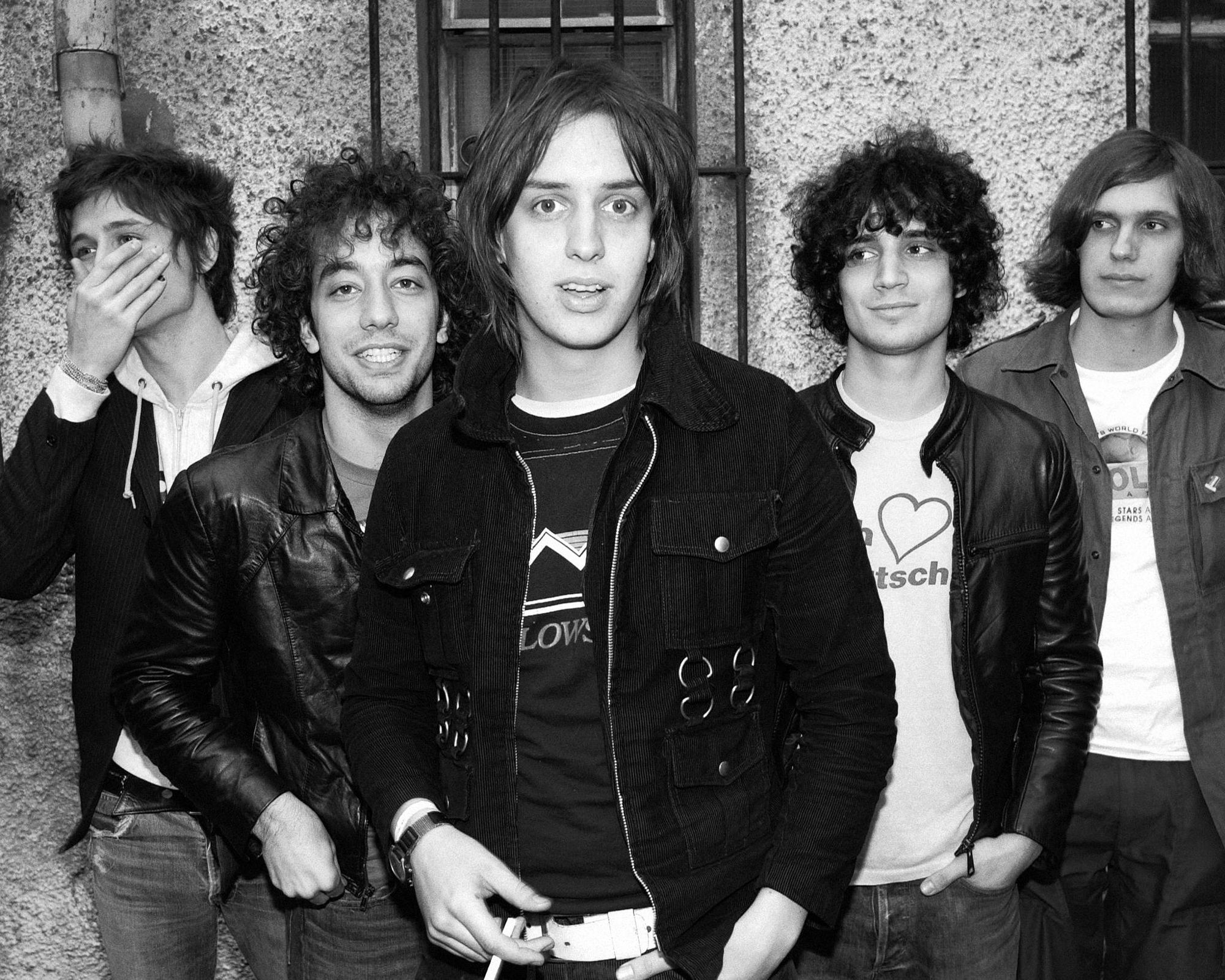
- The Strokes in 2002. From left to right: Nick Valensi, Albert Hammond Jr., Julian Casablancas, Fabrizio Moretti and Nikolai Fraiture.
Awards and nominations
| Award | Wins | Nominations |
| ASCAP Vanguard Awards | 1 | 1 |
| Brit Awards | 1 | 4 |
| Grammy Awards | 1 | 1 |
| Meteor Music Awards | 1 | 1 |
| MTV Europe Music Awards | 0 | 3 |
| MTV Video Music Awards | 0 | 1 |
| NME Awards | 4 | 9 |
| Pollstar Awards | 0 | 1 |
| Q Awards | 0 | 1 |
| UK Music Video Awards | 0 | 2 |
| Žebřík Music Awards | 0 | 4 |

Totals (Note: Certain award groups do not simply award one winner. They acknowledge several different recipients, have runners-up, and have third place. Since this is a specific recognition and is different from losing an award, runner-up mentions are considered wins in this award tally. For simplification and to avoid errors, each award in this list has been presumed to have had a prior nomination.)
- Wins: 8
- Nominations: 28

The Strokes are an American indie rock band formed in 1998 in New York City. The band consists of lead vocalist Julian Casablancas, guitarists Nick Valensi and Albert Hammond Jr., bassist Nikolai Fraiture, and drummer Fabrizio Moretti. They have released six albums: Is This It (2001), Room on Fire (2003), First Impressions of Earth (2005), Angles (2011), Comedown Machine (2013), and The New Abnormal (2020). Is This It became a classic work of the 2000s garage rock revival and earned multiple platinum certifications, as did Room on Fire.

The Strokes have received 8 awards from 28 nominations. They have received one Brit Award for International Breakthrough Act, one Grammy Award for Best Rock Album for The New Abnormal, and one Meteor Music Award for Best International Album for Is This It.

== Awards and nominations ==
List of awards and nominations received by the Strokes
| Award | Year (Note: Indicates the year of ceremony. Each year is linked to the article about the awards held that year, wherever possible.) | Recipient(s) and nominee(s) | Category | Result | Ref. |
|---|---|---|---|---|---|
| ASCAP Vanguard Awards | 2002 | Is This It | Best International Album | Won | |
| Brit Awards | 2002 | Is This It | International Album | Nominated | |
| Brit Awards | 2002 | The Strokes | International Breakthrough Act | Won | |
| Brit Awards | 2002 | The Strokes | International Group | Nominated | |
| Brit Awards | 2004 | The Strokes | International Group | Nominated | |
| Grammy Awards | 2021 | The New Abnormal | Best Rock Album | Won | |
| Meteor Music Awards | 2002 | Is This It | Best International Album | Won | |
| MTV Europe Music Awards | 2002 | The Strokes | Best New Act | Nominated | |
| MTV Europe Music Awards | 2006 | The Strokes | Best Rock | Nominated | |
| MTV Europe Music Awards | 2011 | The Strokes | Best Alternative | Nominated | |
| MTV Video Music Awards | 2002 | "Last Nite" | MTV2 Award | Nominated | |
| NME Awards | 2002 | Is This It | Best Album | Won | |
| NME Awards | 2002 | The Strokes | Band of the Year | Won | |
| NME Awards | 2002 | The Strokes | Best New Act | Won | |
| NME Awards | 2003 | The Strokes | Best International Band | Nominated | |
| NME Awards | 2005 | The Strokes | Best International Band | Nominated | |
| NME Awards | 2006 | The Strokes | Best International Band | Won | |
| NME Awards | 2006 | "Juicebox" | Best Video | Nominated | |
| NME Awards | 2007 | The Strokes | Best International Band | Nominated | |
| NME Awards | 2016 | The Strokes | Best International Band | Nominated | |
| Pollstar Awards | 2002 | The Strokes | Best New Artist Tour | Nominated | |
| Q Awards | 2002 | The Strokes | Best Live Act | Nominated | |
| UK Music Video Awards | 2020 | "Bad Decisions" | Best International Rock Video | Nominated | |
| UK Music Video Awards | 2020 | "Ode to the Mets" | Best International Rock Video | Nominated | |
| Žebřík Music Awards | 2001 | The Strokes | Best International Surprise | Nominated | |
| Žebřík Music Awards | 2002 | The Strokes | Best International Surprise | Nominated | |
| Žebřík Music Awards | 2003 | Room on Fire | Best International Album | Nominated | |
| Žebřík Music Awards | 2003 | "12:51" | Best International Song | Nominated | |
