= The End Has No End =

2004 single by the Strokes

Single by The Strokes

from the album Room on Fire
- B-side: "Clampdown" (Live)
- Released: November 1, 2004
- Genre: Garage rock, new wave
- Length: 3:07
- Label: RCA
- Songwriter: Julian Casablancas
- Producer: Gordon Raphael

The Strokes singles chronology
"Reptilia" (2004)	"The End Has No End" (2004)	"Juicebox" (2005)

"The End Has No End"
"The End Has No End" by The Strokes

"The End Has No End" is a song by American rock band the Strokes. It was released as the third and final single from their second studio album, Room on Fire (2003) on November 1, 2004. The song was written by Julian Casablancas and produced by Gordon Raphael. The B-side to the single is a cover of the Clash song "Clampdown", recorded from a live performance at London's Alexandra Palace. The Alexandra Palace performance was intended to be the Strokes' first live album, but was scrapped due to poor sound quality.

== Music video ==
The music video for the song contains several allusions to Stanley Kubrick's 2001: A Space Odyssey and features actresses Mila Kunis and Eva Mendes as well as The Strokes' manager Ryan Gentles in the lead role. It was directed by Sophie Muller. The Strokes can be seen in the video during the prom scene. The band performance in the mirrored room is a nod to the album cover for (No Pussyfooting) (1973) by Fripp & Eno and A Flock of Seagulls' "I Ran" music video. The final scene from the video is a clip from the band's first single "12:51" off the same album Room on Fire, and is a reference to the 1982 film Tron.

== Track listing ==
No.	Title	Length
1.	"The End Has No End"	3:02
2.	"Clampdown (Live)" (The Clash cover)	2:59

== Personnel ==
- Julian Casablancas – vocals
- Albert Hammond, Jr. – guitar
- Nick Valensi – guitar
- Nikolai Fraiture – bass
- Fabrizio Moretti – drums

== Charts ==
Chart (2004)	Peak position
Scottish Singles Sales (Official Charts)	34
UK Singles (Official Charts)	27
UK Indie (Official Charts)	3
US Alternative Airplay (Billboard)	35
