= The Modern Age =

2001 EP by The Strokes

EP by The Strokes
- Released: January 29, 2001
- Recorded: November 2000
- Studios: Transporterraum, New York City
- Genres: Indie rock; garage rock revival; post-punk revival
- Length: 11:09
- Labels: Beggars Banquet; Rough Trade
- Producer: Gordon Raphael

The Strokes chronology
| The Modern Age (2001) | Is This It (2001) |

Professional ratings
Review scores
| Source | Rating |
|---|---|
| AllMusic | 4/5 stars |
| Robert Christgau | A− |
| The Rolling Stone Album Guide | 4/5 stars |

The Modern Age is the debut EP by American indie rock band The Strokes. It was released on January 29, 2001, in the United Kingdom, by independent label Rough Trade Records, and May 22, 2001, in the United States, sparking a bidding war among record labels, the largest for a rock band in years.

"The Modern Age", and the other tracks on The Modern Age EP would later be re-recorded for their debut album, Is This It, with slightly altered lyrics and arrangements.

== Track listing ==
All tracks are written by Julian Casablancas.

The Modern Age EP track listing
| No. | Title | Length |
|---|---|---|
| 1. | "The Modern Age" | 3:13 |
| 2. | "Last Nite" | 3:19 |
| 3. | "Barely Legal" | 4:37 |

== Personnel ==
Personnel taken from The Modern Age liner notes.

The Strokes

- Fab Moretti – drums
- Nick Valensi – guitar
- Nikolai Fraiture – bass
- Albert Hammond Jr. – guitar
- Julian Casablancas – vocals

Additional personnel

- Gordon Raphael – production, engineering
- Ryan Gentles – management

== Charts ==
=== Weekly charts ===
Weekly chart performance for "The Modern Age" by The Strokes
| Chart (2001) | Peak position |
|---|---|
| Canada (Nielsen SoundScan) | 28 |
| Norway (VG-lista) | 20 |
| UK Singles (Official Charts) | 68 |

=== Year-end charts ===
2001 year-end chart performance for "The Modern Age" by The Strokes
| Chart (2001) | Position |
|---|---|
| Canada (Nielsen SoundScan) | 103 |

2002 year-end chart performance for "The Modern Age" by The Strokes
| Chart (2002) | Position |
|---|---|
| Canada (Nielsen SoundScan) | 147 |
