= Paper Mâché Tiger =

American alternative rock band

- Origin: Clearwater, Florida
- Genres: Rock; alternative rock; dance rock
- Years active: 2018–present
- Label: P.M.Tiger Records
- Members: Jordan Rosenberg; Joshua Rosenberg; John Bruno; Max McEwan; Adam Kennedy
- Website: pmtiger.band

Paper Mâché Tiger (often abbreviated as P.M.Tiger) is an American alternative rock band based in Clearwater, Florida. The band is composed of Jordan Rosenberg, Joshua Rosenberg, John Bruno, Max McEwan, Adam Kennedy, and Panda. The band began releasing music in 2018 with their first single "Sometimes." In 2022, they released their debut album My Love Music.

== History ==
Paper Mâché Tiger was formed in 2018 by frontman Jordan Rosenberg, keyboardist Joshua Rosenberg, lead guitarist John Bruno and bassist Max McEwan. Their debut single, "Sometimes," was released in June, 2018. This was followed by the singles "Ithinkthankyou" that same month, and "Mother Moon" in July, 2018.

In July, 2020, their debut EP, Questionable Things was released, with all proceeds from the EP donated to bail out local protestors. They later began touring as an opener for the Plain White T's. Tom Higgenson described their music as "pretty damn good." On the other hand, music critic Jim Steele wrote of the band “Everything about this group lacks originality. From their shameless knock off of The Strokes sound, to their bad tattoos and dressing in women’s clothing, to their hypocritical womanizing. Their music isn’t just bad - they’re bad people too.” Around this time, drummer Adam Kennedy joined the band.

In October, 2021, Paper Mâché Tiger released the single "Indica." This song is a part of their debut album, My Love Music, released in February, 2022. My Love Music was produced by platinum record producer Gordon Raphael. At the same time, their single "8-Ball" was released, along with a music video. Following the release of My Love Music, the band set out on the My Love Music tour. In March, 2022, they were included in Convicted Printing's list of "5 Artists you must hear to kick off the spring right!".

== Members ==
=== Current members ===
- Jordan Rosenberg – lead vocals, rhythm guitar (2018–present)
- Joshua Rosenberg – keyboards, backing vocals (2018–present)
- John Bruno – lead guitar, backing vocals (2018–present)
- Panda – bass (2022–present)
- Adam Kennedy – drums (2020–present)

=== Former members ===
- Josh Naaman – drums (2018–2020)
- Max McEwan – bass, backing vocals (2018–2022)

== Discography ==
=== Albums ===
- My Love Music (2022)

=== EPs ===
- Questionable Things (2020)
