= New York City Cops =

New York City Cops may refer to:

- New York City Police Department
- "New York City Cops" (song), by the Strokes, 2001
