= Hard to Explain =

2001 single by The Strokes

Single by The Strokes

from the album Is This It
- B-side: "New York City Cops"
- Released: June 25, 2001
- Recorded: March and April 2001
- Studio: Transporterraum, New York City
- Genre: Indie rock; garage rock revival; post-punk revival
- Length: 3:48
- Label: Rough Trade; RCA
- Songwriter: Julian Casablancas
- Producer: Gordon Raphael

The Strokes singles chronology
"Hard to Explain" (2001)	"Last Nite" (2001)

Australian cover

Music video
- "Hard to Explain" on YouTube

"Hard to Explain" is a song by American rock band the Strokes. It was released as the lead single from their debut studio album, Is This It (2001), June 25, 2001. It peaked at number 7 in Canada, number 10 in Ireland, and number 16 in the United Kingdom. In a 2023 interview, producer Gordon Raphael explained that the song was originally written by frontman Julian Casablancas with his drum machine.

== Reception ==
The single was voted number 3 on the NME Top 100 songs of the decade. In October 2011, NME placed it at number 36 on its list "150 Best Tracks of the Past 15 Years". Rolling Stone placed the song at number 59 on its list "100 Best Songs of the 2000s." In 2020, The Independent and Paste ranked the song number two and number one, respectively, on their lists of the 20 greatest Strokes songs.

== Music video ==
The music video for this song largely consists of a montage of random stock footage interspersed with images of the band members performing. It was directed by the team of Roman Coppola and Johannes Gamble (as well as an uncredited Julian Casablancas). Footage of The Strokes playing "Take It or Leave It" from MTV2's "Two Dollar Bill" concert is used in the video. Amongst stock footage, the video contains clips from Magnum, P.I. and Knight Rider (both of which are credited), a clip from the film Brainstorm, a commercial for the 1970 Dodge Charger 500 (scene of a woman sitting in a car), a clip from the film WarGames, NASA footage of the Space Shuttle Atlantis in orbit, gameplay of the 1981 Sega arcade game Turbo, the rocket engine firing of the Saturn V and an image of particle tracks in a bubble chamber (which forms the American album cover for Is This It). Some of the stock footage was taken from the film Koyaanisqatsi, directed by Godfrey Reggio, which was presented by Francis Ford Coppola.

== Track listing ==
All tracks are written by Julian Casablancas.

7-inch vinyl
No.	Title	Length
1.	"Hard to Explain"	3:43
2.	"New York City Cops"	3:30

CD
No.	Title	Length
1.	"Hard to Explain"	3:43
2.	"New York City Cops"	3:30
3.	"Take It or Leave It" (in LA)	3:15
4.	"Trying Your Luck" (in LA)	3:25

Ireland CD
No.	Title	Length
1.	"Hard to Explain"	3:43
2.	"The Modern Age"	3:30
3.	"Last Nite"	3:15
4.	"When It Started"	2:59
5.	"Take It or Leave It" (live)	3:15

== Personnel ==
The Strokes

- Julian Casablancas – vocals
- Albert Hammond Jr. – guitar
- Nick Valensi – guitar
- Nikolai Fraiture – bass guitar
- Fab Moretti – drums

Additional personnel

- Gordon Raphael – production
- Greg Calbi – mastering

== Charts ==
Chart performance for "Hard to Explain"
Chart (2001–2002)	Peak position
Australia (ARIA)	66
Canada (Nielsen SoundScan)	7
Ireland (IRMA)	10
Sweden (Sverigetopplistan)	56
UK Singles (Official Charts)	16
UK Indie (Official Charts)	1
US Alternative Airplay (Billboard)	27

== Certifications ==
Certifications and sales for "Hard to Explain"
Region	Certification	Certified units/sales
United Kingdom (BPI)	Silver	200,000^{‡}
^{‡} Sales+streaming figures based on certification alone.
