= Jada (singer) =

Danish singer (born 1993)

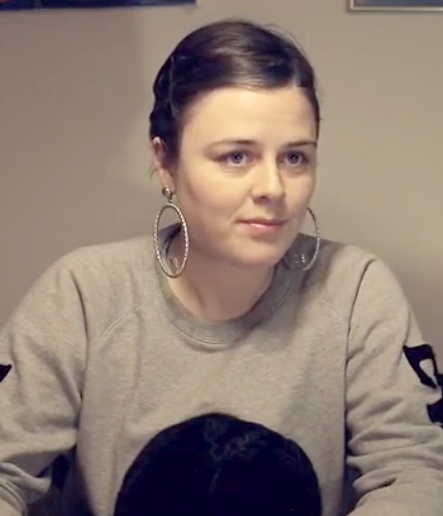
- Jada in a 2017 interview
- Born: Emilie Molsted Nørgaard; 19 February 1993 (age 33); Bisserup, West Zealand, Denmark
- Occupations: Singer; songwriter; producer
- Years active: 2017–present
- Musical career
- Instruments: Vocals
- Labels: Virgin Denmark; Universal Denmark

Emilie Molsted Nørgaard (born 19 February 1993), known professionally as Jada, is a Danish singer, songwriter and producer. She has released two studio albums: I Cry A Lot (2019) and Elements (2022).

== Career ==
In January 2018, she released her debut single "Keep Cool", followed by "Sure" in May. In January 2019, she won the P3 Talent Award at the P3 Guld and performed her single "Lonely". In June 2019, she released her debut studio album I Cry A Lot, which debuted on number 16 at the Danish Albums Chart. In August 2019, she became the subject of the DR3 documentary series Jada – lillebitte kæmpestor, following her first year of career. In November 2019, she was awarded the Kronprinsparrets Stjernedryspris at the Crown Prince Couple's Awards. In 2020, she became the first artist to win both P3 Prisen and P3 Lytterhittet during the same ceremony at the P3 Guld.

She released her sophomore studio album Elements on 27 May 2022. In June 2022, Jada was featured in Kesi's track "Skør for dig" on his sixth studio album 30 somre. In July 2022, she headlined the Roskilde Festival 2022.

In June 2023, she was set to be the opening act for Coldplay's Music of the Spheres World Tour dates in Copenhagen, but was replaced by Oh Land due to pregnancy complications. In October 2024, Jada held a concert with Copenhagen Philharmonic titled 60 Minutes of Jada, at the Konservatoriets Koncertsal.

== Discography ==
List of studio albums, with chart positions and certifications
Title	Details	Peak chart positions	Certifications
Title	Details	DEN	Certifications
I Cry A Lot	Released: 28 June 2019; Label: Virgin Music Denmark, Universal Music Denmark	16	IFPI Danmark: Gold
Elements	Released: 27 May 2022; Label: Virgin Music Denmark, Universal Music Denmark	5	IFPI Danmark: Gold

=== Singles ===
As lead artist

List of singles, with chart positions, album name and certifications
Title	Year	Peak chart positions	Certifications	Album
Title	Year	DEN	Certifications	Album
"Keep Cool"	2018	—		I Cry a Lot
"Sure"	2018	—		I Cry a Lot
"Lonely"	2019	—	IFPI Danmark: Gold	I Cry a Lot
"Clean Love"	2019	—		I Cry a Lot
"Lifetime" (with Vera)	2020	—		Non-album single
"Nudes"	2020	8	IFPI Danmark: Platinum	Elements
"I'm Back"	2021	—		Elements
"On Me"	2022	—	IFPI Danmark: Gold	Elements

As featured artist

List of singles, with chart positions, album name and certifications
Title	Year	Peak chart positions	Certifications	Album
Title	Year	DEN	Certifications	Album
"Tættere end vi tror" (P3 featuring Tessa, Lukas Graham, Mads Langer, Jada, Benjamin Hav, Christopher, Clara & Don Stefano)	2020	1	IFPI Danmark: Platinum	Non-album single
"Skør for dig" (Kesi featuring Jada)	2022	8	IFPI Danmark: Platinum	30 somre

=== Guest appearances ===
Title	Year	Other artist(s)	Album
"The One"	2018	Alina Baraz	The Color Of You
"REM"	2022	Phlake	Phine
"Hypnotized"	2023	August Rosenbaum	songs people together
