= Someday (The Strokes song) =

2002 single by the Strokes

Single by The Strokes

from the album Is This It
- B-side: "Alone, Together (Home Recording)"; "Is This It (Home Recording)"
- Released: August 5, 2002
- Studio: Transporterraum, New York City
- Genre: Indie rock; garage rock revival
- Length: 3:05
- Label: RCA; Rough Trade
- Songwriter: Julian Casablancas
- Producer: Gordon Raphael

The Strokes singles chronology
"Last Nite" (2001)	"Someday" (2002)	"12:51" (2003)

Music video
- "Someday" on YouTube

"Someday" is a song by American rock band the Strokes, written by singer Julian Casablancas. It was released on August 5, 2002, as the third and final single from Is This It (2001). It peaked at number 17 on the US Modern Rock Tracks chart and at number 27 on the UK Singles Chart. It was ranked at number 53 on Pitchfork magazine's list of the 200 Best Songs of the 2000s. In 2020, Paste and The Independent ranked the song number eight and number three, respectively, on their lists of the 20 greatest Strokes songs.

== Music video ==
The music video for the song was directed by Roman Coppola and features appearances by Slash, Duff McKagan, and Matt Sorum (the respective guitarist, bassist, and drummer from Guns N' Roses and Velvet Revolver) as well as the members of Guided by Voices. The video also features Richard Karn as himself, while the Strokes take on Guided by Voices in a fictional game of Family Feud.

== Track listing ==
All tracks are written by Julian Casablancas.

No.	Title	Length
1.	"Someday"	3:05
2.	"Alone, Together (Home Recording)"	2:59
3.	"Is This It (Home Recording)"	3:27
4.	"Soma (Live)"	3:29

- "Alone, Together" recorded 28.02.00 –12 am to 4 am
- "Is This It" recorded at J.P.'s House 16.02.01 - In the afternoon
- "Soma" recorded 02.04.02 at the Broadway, Reykjavik, Iceland

== Personnel ==
The Strokes

- Julian Casablancas – vocals
- Nick Valensi – guitar
- Albert Hammond Jr. – guitar
- Nikolai Fraiture – bass guitar
- Fab Moretti – drums

Additional personnel

- Gordon Raphael – production
- Greg Calbi – mastering

== Charts ==
Chart (2002)	Peak position
Canada (Nielsen SoundScan)	49
Netherlands (Single Top 100)	84
Scottish Singles Sales (Official Charts)	26
UK Singles (Official Charts)	27
UK Indie (Official Charts)	5
US Alternative Airplay (Billboard)	17

== Certifications ==
Region	Certification	Certified units/sales
New Zealand (RMNZ)	Platinum	30,000^{‡}
Portugal (AFP)	Gold	20,000^{‡}
Spain (Promusicae)	Gold	30,000^{‡}
United Kingdom (BPI)	Platinum	600,000^{‡}
United States (RIAA)	Platinum	1,000,000^{‡}
^{‡} Sales+streaming figures based on certification alone.

== Release history ==
Region	Date	Format(s)	Label(s)	Ref.
United States	August 5, 2002	Alternative radio	RCA	
United Kingdom	September 23, 2002	7-inch vinyl; CD	Rough Trade	

== Appearances in other media ==
This song was featured in the 2006 movie Click, starring Adam Sandler, and on the Major League Baseball 2K8 soundtrack.

It was sampled on Rhymefest's song "Devil's Pie", produced by Mark Ronson from the album Blue Collar.

The Australian Internet service provider iiNet frequently uses "Someday" in its advertisements. As of 2018, TUI also use the song.

On January 20, 2017, Julia Jacklin covered the song on Like a Version, a program hosted by Australian radio station Triple J.

Someday is also featured in the 2023 film Blackberry.
