= Lewis Lazar =

Musician and painter

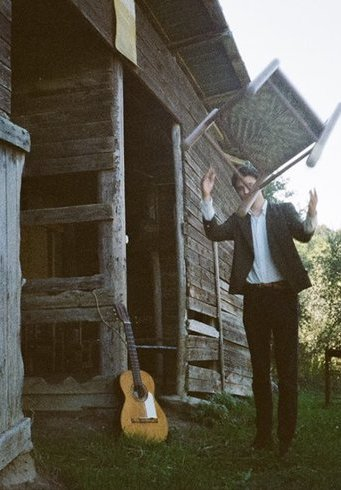

Lewis Lazar is a musician, songwriter, composer, multi-instrumentalist, and painter based in Paris. He has been active around three musical projects: under his own name, Oracle Sisters and formerly the supergroup Summer Moon.

Prints from his illustrated book, The Book of JibJab, were displayed at the Crypt gallery in London in association with black&BLUE in 2014 and subsequently sold in the UK. His band, Lewis Lazar and the Hydras, performed residencies at Happy Ending and the Leadbelly, and around New York City. He recorded and self released numerous recordings including The Time of the Assassins (2012), produced by Gordon Raphael, and The King O' The Cats (2013).

In 2015 Lewis Lazar signed with Japanese independent record label MAGNIPH and Hostess to release his self produced record Razzmatazz recorded in New York City in Chinatown. The album was completed in 2016 and released in stores in Japan on Saint Patrick's day in 2017 Two singles off the album have been released in Europe.

In 2015, Lazar joined up with Nikolai Fraiture (The Strokes), Tennessee Thomas, and Erika Spring (Au Revoir Simone) to form Summer Moon. In 2015 Summer Moon released an online single "With You Tonight" and performed at the Bowery Ballroom, SXSW, Baby's All Right, and Central Park Summer Fest along with Father John Misty,

In 2017, Lewis moved to Paris and began Oracle Sisters with childhood friend Christopher Willatt releasing their first single "Always" and "I'm You" in 2018. Oracle Sisters were chosen as 'the top 100 essential artists of 2019' by NME.
