= Oracle Sisters =

French band

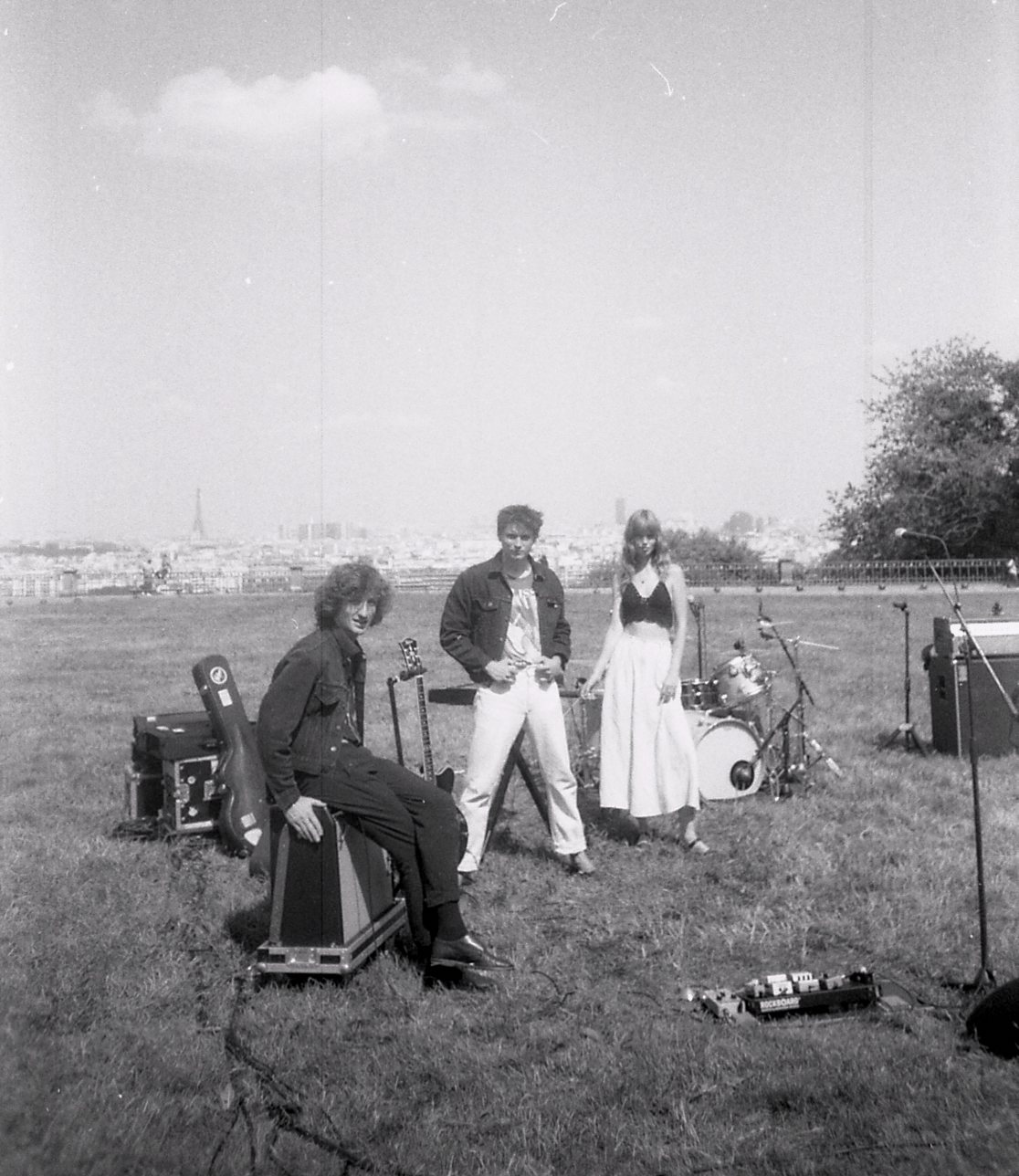

Background information
- Origin: Paris, France
- Genre: Indie rock
- Years active: 2017-present
- Labels: La Torpille (2018-19), 22Twenty (2019-23), Wizard Artists (2024-)
- Members: Lewis Lazar; Christopher Willatt; Julia Johansen
- Website: oraclesisters.com

The Oracle Sisters is a Paris-based indie rock, indie folk, and indie pop band formed in 2017. The band consists of multi-instrumentalists Lewis Lazar, Christopher Willatt, and Julia Johansen. They were featured as one of NME's Essential New Artists for 2019.

The name "Oracle Sisters" was inspired by the film The Warriors. Lazar said in an interview with Clash Magazine, "We were trying to find a gang name that connotated the type of music we were writing at the time. The Oracle Sisters was inspired by that concept of all these games. Like The Baseball Furies – the two words put together describe an entity. We were looking for our own warriors gang."

== History ==
Despite being based in Paris, none of the members of the band is of French origin. Lewis Lazar is from Denmark, Chris Willatt is from Northern Ireland, and Johansen is from Finland. Lazar and Willatt met at school aged 15 or 16 in Brussels but diverged afterwards to New York and Scotland, respectively. The pair met Julia Johansen in 2017, a year after reuniting in Paris. Originally, Johansen collaborated with Lazar and Willatt as a singer, officially forming Oracle Sisters, but soon found her place primarily on drums.

The band released their first single, "Always," in 2018, followed by three more standalone singles in 2019, and their first EP, Paris I, was released in 2020. Paris I includes their most popular song, "Asc. Scorpio," which in March 2026 passed 80 million plays on Spotify. Paris II, their second EP, came only ten months later in 2021. They released nine more songs in four single releases in 2021-22.

Their debut album, Hydranism, released in 2023. It was recorded in 2020 in the midst of the COVID-19 pandemic on the island of Hydra, in Greece. The band remained there while on "lockdown" from the pandemic for 2 months. 35 songs were written, 20 were recorded, and only 11 made it to the album.

A three-song release of live versions of "Hail Mary" and "RBH" from Hydranism and "I Don't Wanna Move" from Paris II came a month before the album via OurVinyl. In addition, the band covered The Strokes' song "Under Control" for A Tribute to the Strokes: The Songs of Room on Fire later in 2023.

Divinations, the band's second album, was released on February 14, 2025, via Wizard Artists, their own record label. It was heavily inspired by the band's time touring abroad in 2023. New Noise Magazine called it "a nomadic record," as it was "partially recorded in Parisian studios, Valentine Studios in L.A., and even an icy barn in the French wilderness."

Oracle Sisters has played at various festivals throughout Europe, plus SXSW in 2023, and opened for Declan McKenna's US tour in 2023 and L'Impératrice and Colapesce in 2024. They headlined a 23 date UK/EU tour in 2025 and will play the main stage at the Tramlines festival. They tour the US and Canada in the fall of the same year with 18 venues.

== Music ==
The band's sound can be described as indie pop, indie folk, and indie rock. Their music often resembles retro pop riffs. Lazar has cited The Beatles, early Velvet Underground, and Simon and Garfunkel as early influences on the band. NME described Paris I as, "folky, sun-kissed and oozing with mellow optimism."

The city of Paris is often brought up as a main inspiration for their music. Their EPs Paris I and Paris II are described as narratives set in the city.

Though the instrumental roles within the band are very fluid, Lazar and Willatt both primarily contribute guitar and vocals and Johansen primarily contributes drums. The band brings in other musicians to fill the roles of bass and keys when performing live.

== Discography ==
=== Albums ===
- Hydranism (April 7, 2023) via 22TWENTY
- Divinations (February 14, 2025) via Wizard Artists

=== EPs ===
- Paris I (July 8, 2020) via 22TWENTY
- Paris II (April 7, 2021) via 22TWENTY

=== Singles ===
- "Always" (November 22, 2018) via La Torpille
- "I'm You" (January 30, 2019) via La Torpille
- "Spotlight" (August 21, 2019) via La Torpille
- "From Kay's to the Cloisters" (November 20, 2019) via 22TWENTY
- "Asc. Scorpio" (from Paris I, March 11, 2020) via 22TWENTY
- "Most of All" (from Paris I, April 22, 2020) via 22TWENTY
- "High Moon" (from Paris I, June 3, 2020) via 22TWENTY
- "The Dandelion" (from Paris II, December 2, 2020) via 22TWENTY
- "I Don't Wanna Move" (from Paris II, March 3, 2021) via 22TWENTY
- "Midnight Afternoon" (October 15, 2021) via 22TWENTY
- "Captain America/Siren Song" (December 14, 2021) via 22TWENTY
- "Tangerine/Prisoner of Love" (September 14, 2022) via 22TWENTY
- "Who Knows Where the Time Goes/Yerre Blues" (December 7, 2022) via 22TWENTY
- "Tramp Like You" (from Hydranism, January 18, 2023) via 22TWENTY
- "Hot Summer" (from Hydranism, February 15, 2023) via 22TWENTY
- "RBH" (from Hydranism, March 8, 2023) via 22TWENTY
- "Oracle Sisters | OurVinyl Sessions" (March 10, 2023) via OurVinyl
- "Under Control" (from A Tribute to the Strokes: The Songs of Room on Fire, November 10, 2023) via GM Records
- "Alouette" (from Divinations, October 30, 2024) via Wizard Artists
- "Riverside" (from Divinations, December 11, 2024) via Wizard Artists
- "Blue Left Hand" (from Divinations, January 15, 2025) via Wizard Artists
