= Blæst =

Danish band

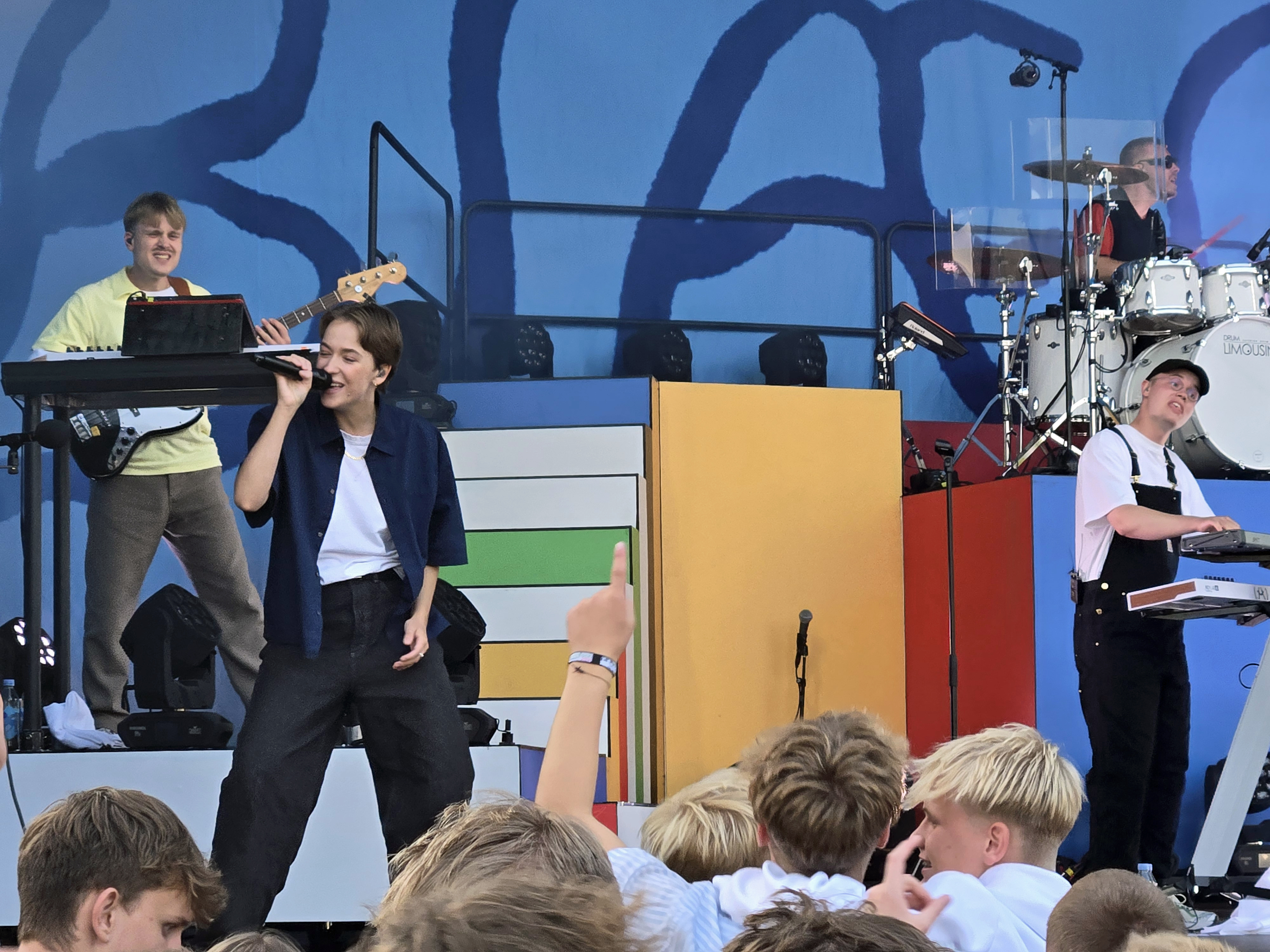

Background information
- Origin: Denmark
- Years active: 2019–present
- Labels: We are suburban; Virgin Music Denmark; EMI Denmark; Universal Music Denmark
- Members: Sarah Sofie Malmros; Lauge Kjærulf; Valentin Buchwald; Anders Bondo
- Past members: Fernanda Rosa Brygmann
- Website: https://www.blaestband.dk/en

Blæst are a Danish pop band, consisting of Sarah Sofie Malmros (lead vocals, since 2025), Lauge Kjærulf (drums), Valentin Buchwald (bass and synthesizers) and Anders Bondo (guitar).

The band describe their music as "naive everyday poetry that people can dance to". The sound is inspired by Tom Misch and Snarky Puppy.

== History ==
=== 2019–2021: Early years and Vindstille ===
Drummer Lauge Kjærulf and bassist Valentin Buchwald met at their music school in Næstved, Denmark, when they were eight and nine years old. They both played in several different bands, both together and separately. During those years, Kjærulf played in a punk rock band, while Buchwald produced electronic music. They eventually initiated Blæst from their frustration and drive to create Danish-language pop music.

The two then started looking for a vocalist and found Fernanda Rosa on SoundCloud. They were impressed by the music she put up on the site. They met in a cafe in Copenhagen to offer her to join the band. Rosa was skeptical at first but became convinced after playing a few gigs together. Guitarist Anders Bondo also joined the band around the period. Kjærulf knew Bondo from a jazz fusion band they both played in, while Buchwald and Bondo went to the same high school.

The group's first single "Du gør det bedre" was released on 11 October 2019. Their debut extended play Vindstille was released on 29 May 2020 through record label We Are Suburban. Their next single "Kig op fra gulvet" was released almost a year after on 16 April 2021 as their first release with record label Universal Music. The song was performed by contestant Lorenzo & Charlo in the first live show of the fifteen season of Danish X Factor on 25 February 2022.

=== 2022–present: Breakthrough with "Juice" and Stiv kuling ===
Blæst released a single titled "Juice" on 4 February 2022 and met commercial and radio success. The single was awarded with P3 Lytterhittet at the P3 Guld 2022 as the most played song on the radio channel DR P3. On 28 June 2022, Blæst performed at the Rising Stage of the Roskilde Festival 2022 to a crowd of 20,000 people.

They released their debut studio album Stiv kuling on 30 September 2022. The album received generally favorable reviews from critics. They were set to embark on a 27-date nationwide concert tour in support of the album from October to December 2022. However, the day before the tour started, the band cancelled the first leg of the tour due to stress. A month later, the band announced on their social media that they had got better but had to cancel the entire tour.

On 17 February 2023, the band released a single titled "All In" featuring singer and rapper Lamin. On 31 March 2023, the group performed a medley of their singles "Juice" and "All In" with contestant Sigalaz at the sixteen season finale of X Factor.

On 28 June, they opened the iconic Orange Stage of the 2023 Roskilde Festival.

== Band members ==
- Sarah Sofie Malmros - vocals
- Lauge Kjærulf – drums
- Valentin Buchwald – bass, synthesizers
- Anders Bondo – guitar

== Discography ==
=== Studio albums ===
List of studio albums, with chart positions and certifications
Title	Details	Peak chart positions	Certifications
Title	Details	DEN	Certifications
Stiv kuling	Released: 30 September 2022; Label: Virgin Music, EMI, Universal Music; Formats: CD, digital download, vinyl	4	IFPI DEN: 2× Platinum
Dine venner	Released: 11 October 2024; Label: Island, Capitol, Universal Music; Formats: CD, digital download, vinyl	5	IFPI DEN: Platinum
Blæst Forever	Released: 19 June 2026; Label: Island, EMI, Universal Music	—	

=== Extended plays ===
List of extended plays with selected details
Title	Details
Vindstille	Released: 29 May 2020; Label: We Are Suburban; Formats: CD, digital download

=== Singles ===
List of singles, with chart positions, album name and certifications
Title	Year	Peak chart positions	Certifications	Album
Title	Year	DEN	Certifications	Album
"Du gør det bedre"	2019	—		Vindstille
"Dine hænder"	2019	—		Vindstille
"Androkles"	2020	—		Vindstille
"Gemmeleg"	2020	—		Vindstille
"Juice"	2022	8	IFPI DEN: 3× Platinum	Stiv kuling
"Lad mig gå"	2022	—	IFPI DEN: Gold	Stiv kuling
"Sover du nu"	2022	28	IFPI DEN: Platinum	Stiv kuling
"All In" (featuring Lamin)	2023	3	IFPI DEN: Platinum	Dine venner
"Videre"	2023	36		Dine venner
"Elsker dig så meget"	2024	38	IFPI DEN: 2× Platinum	Dine venner
"Lige nu" (featuring Artigeardit)	2024	27		Dine venner
"Vi ku' gå hele vejen"	2025	23	IFPI DEN: Gold	Non-album single

== Awards and nominations ==
Year	Award	Category	Recipient	Result	Ref.
2022	P3 Guld	P3 Lytterhittet	"Juice"	Won	
2022	Danish Music Awards	Best New Artist	Blæst	Nominated	
2022	Danish Music Awards	Best New Live Act	Blæst	Nominated	
2022	Danish Music Awards	Radio Hit of the Year	"Juice"	Nominated	
