= Reality Check (The Teenagers album) =

Studio album by the Teenagers
- Released: 18 March 2008
- Recorded: 2005–06
- Genre: Synth-pop; indie rock
- Length: 46:42
- Label: Merok; XL
- Producer: Lexxx; The Teenagers

The Teenagers chronology
The World Is Not Fair (2007)	Reality Check (2008)

Professional ratings
Aggregate scores
Source	Rating
Metacritic	64/100
Review scores
Source	Rating
AllMusic	3/5 stars
The A.V. Club	B
Drowned in Sound	4/10
The Guardian	3/5 stars
NME	8/10
Pitchfork Media	6.9/10
PopMatters	7/10 stars
Spin	3/5 stars

Reality Check is the debut studio album by French synth-pop band the Teenagers. It was released on 18 March 2008 by Merok Records and XL Recordings.

== Track listing ==
All tracks are written by the Teenagers.

No.	Title	Length
1.	"Homecoming"	3:04
2.	"Love No"	2:59
3.	"Feeling Better"	3:03
4.	"Starlett Johansson"	3:09
5.	"Streets of Paris"	2:38
6.	"Make It Happen"	3:34
7.	"Wheel of Fortune"	3:14
8.	"Fuck Nicole"	3:25
9.	"French Kiss"	2:52
10.	"Sunset Beach"	3:55
11.	"III"	2:59
12.	"End of the Road"	3:26

US edition bonus tracks
No.	Title	Length
13.	"Trouble"	2:56
14.	"Starlett Johansson" (Rory Phillips Mix)	5:28

== Charts ==
Chart (2008)	Peak position
French Albums Chart	168
UK Albums Chart	184
UK Independent Albums Chart	13
