= Last Nite =

2001 single by the Strokes

Single by the Strokes

from the album Is This It
- B-side: "When It Started"
- Released: October 23, 2001
- Recorded: March and April 2001
- Studio: Transporterraum, New York City
- Genre: Indie rock; garage rock revival
- Length: 3:13
- Label: RCA; Rough Trade; BMG
- Songwriter: Julian Casablancas
- Producer: Gordon Raphael

The Strokes singles chronology
"Hard to Explain" (2001)	"Last Nite" (2001)	"Someday" (2001)

Music video
- "Last Nite" on YouTube

"Last Nite" is a song by American rock band the Strokes. It was released on October 23, 2001, as the second single from their debut album, Is This It (2001). Outside of the United States, "Last Nite" peaked within the top 20 of the charts in the United Kingdom.

== Background ==
The track was produced by Gordon Raphael and was issued on RCA Records with the song "When It Started" as the B-side.

The song's opening guitar riff and overall structure is based on "American Girl" by Tom Petty and the Heartbreakers. In a 2006 interview with Rolling Stone, Petty commented, "The Strokes took 'American Girl' [for 'Last Nite'], there was an interview that took place with them where they actually admitted it. That made me laugh out loud. I was like, 'OK, good for you.' It doesn't bother me". The Strokes were invited to be the opening act for several dates on Tom Petty and the Heartbreakers' 2006 tour. The solo for the song was inspired by guitarist Freddie King.

== Reception ==
The single was the group's first to enter the American charts, reaching the top five on the Billboard Modern Rock Tracks chart in late 2001. The single also obtained success in the United Kingdom, peaking at number 14 on the UK Singles Chart.

In March 2005, Q placed "Last Nite" at number 66 on its list of the 100 Greatest Guitar Tracks. In September 2006, NME placed "Last Nite" at number one on its list of their "50 Greatest Tracks of the Decade" ranking. In May 2007, NME magazine placed "Last Nite" at number nine in its list of the "50 Greatest Indie Anthems Ever". It was also placed at number 16 on Rolling Stone's "100 Best Songs of the Decade" and number 478 on its list of "The 500 Greatest Songs of All Time". The same publication listed it at number 155 in a revamped version of the list in 2021. In 2011, NME placed it at number four on its list "150 Best Tracks of the Past 15 Years". In 2020, Paste and The Independent ranked the song number two and number one, respectively, on their lists of the 20 greatest Strokes songs.

In 2024, Strokes frontman Julian Casablancas told The Guardian that he was no longer able to listen to the song. He said,

"Last Nite" by the Strokes is pretty dead to me. I’m not sure why. There are some others like "Reptilia", "Hard to Explain", "Someday", "Take It or Leave It", "New York City Cops" that are comparable in terms of crowd reaction that I’m not quite as sick of. If I heard it on the radio, I’d probably turn it off.

== Music video ==
The band were originally unwilling to appear in a music video. The band eventually agreed and the resulting video was directed by Roman Coppola.

== Track listings ==
All songs written by Julian Casablancas.

US/UK

1. "Last Nite" – 3:15
2. "When It Started" – 2:59

AUS

1. "Last Nite" – 3:15
2. "When It Started" – 2:59
3. "Last Nite" (Live) – 3:27
4. "Take It or Leave It" (Live) – 3:29

== Personnel ==
The Strokes

- Julian Casablancas – vocals
- Nick Valensi – guitar
- Albert Hammond Jr. – guitar
- Nikolai Fraiture – bass guitar
- Fab Moretti – drums

Additional personnel

- Gordon Raphael – production
- Greg Calbi – mastering

== Charts ==
=== Weekly charts ===
Chart (2001–2003)	Peak position
Australia (ARIA)	47
Canada (Nielsen SoundScan)	44
Europe (Eurochart Hot 100)	49
Ireland (IRMA)	48
Scottish Singles Sales (Official Charts)	10
UK Singles (Official Charts)	14
UK Indie (Official Charts)	1
US Alternative Airplay (Billboard)	5
US Bubbling Under Hot 100 (Billboard)	8

=== Year-end charts ===
Chart (2002)	Position
US Modern Rock Tracks (Billboard)	26

Chart (2025)	Position
Argentina Anglo Airplay (Monitor Latino)	71

== Certifications ==
Region	Certification	Certified units/sales
Australia (ARIA)	Platinum	70,000^{‡}
Italy (FIMI)	Gold	25,000^{‡}
New Zealand (RMNZ)	2× Platinum	60,000^{‡}
Portugal (AFP)	Platinum	40,000^{‡}
Spain (Promusicae)	Platinum	60,000^{‡}
United Kingdom (BPI)	2× Platinum	1,200,000^{‡}
United States (RIAA)	Platinum	1,000,000^{‡}
^{‡} Sales+streaming figures based on certification alone.

== Release history ==
Region	Date	Format(s)	Label(s)	Ref.
United States	October 23, 2001	Alternative radio	RCA	
United Kingdom	November 5, 2001	7-inch vinyl; CD	Rough Trade	
Australia	December 3, 2001	CD	RCA; BMG	

== Vitamin C version ==
"Last Nite"

Single by Vitamin C
- Released: July 7, 2003
- Length: 3:54
- Label: V2
- Songwriter: Julian Casablancas
- Producers: Dave Derby; Michael Kotch; Fred Maher

Vitamin C singles chronology
"As Long As You're Loving Me" (2001)	"Last Nite" (2003)

=== Background ===
American pop singer Vitamin C covered "Last Nite" and released it as a single in July 2003. The song was produced by Dave Derby, Michael Kotch, and Fred Maher. The single features a sample from Blondie's "Heart of Glass". After Elektra Records dropped Vitamin C when her second album, More, did not sell as expected, she signed to V2 Records in the UK, hoping to break into the music scene there. After her third album was recorded, this single was released exclusively in the UK with plans to release the album a month later. The album was never released.

=== Reception ===
"Last Nite" debuted and peaking at number 70 on the UK Singles Chart and fell down the chart rapidly. V2 shelved Vitamin C's album afterwards and dropped her. However, "Last Nite" is Vitamin C's only chart entry on the UK Singles Chart, making it her most successful single there.

=== Music video ===
The music video for "Last Nite" was shot in New York City. It features Vitamin C, as a blonde, in or around the Hotel Chelsea as well as other New York City night spots. The club CBGB is seen in the video.

=== Track listings ===
Adapted from European CD Single.

1. "Last Nite" – 3:54
2. "Last Nite" (Derby & Kotch Mix) – 3:45
3. "Last Nite" (I Lick That Mix by Count Caligula) – 5:40
4. "Last Nite" (Clique Remix) – 6:05

=== Charts ===
Chart (2003)	Peak position
Romania (Romanian Top 100)	53
Scottish Singles Sales (Official Charts)	50
UK Singles (Official Charts)	70
UK Dance (Official Charts)	33
UK Indie (Official Charts)	10

== Cover versions, samples and parodies ==
- "Last Nite" was used in the parody "Angry White Boy Polka" by "Weird Al" Yankovic for his 2003 album Poodle Hat, sung in doo wop.
- "Last Nite" was covered by Brazilian group Rebeldes' member Chay Suede for their tour Nada Pode Nos Parar, and was included on their live album, Rebeldes: Ao Vivo (2012).
- "Last Nite" was sampled in the song "Only Wanna Dance with You" by Kesha for her 2012 album, Warrior.
- Tame Impala covered "Last Nite" at the Primavera Sound 2022 festival after a COVID-19 infection caused The Strokes to cancel their headlining set at the last minute.
