= Room on Fire =

2003 studio album by the Strokes

Studio album by The Strokes
- Released: October 20, 2003
- Recorded: January – September 2003
- Studio: TMF (New York City)
- Genres: Indie rock; garage rock revival; new wave
- Length: 32:15
- Label: RCA
- Producer: Gordon Raphael

The Strokes chronology
Is This It (2001)	Room on Fire (2003)	First Impressions of Earth (2005)

Singles from Room on Fire
- 1. "12:51" Released: November 4, 2003; 2. "Reptilia" Released: February 9, 2004; 3. "The End Has No End" Released: November 1, 2004

Room on Fire is the second studio album by American rock band the Strokes, released on October 20, 2003 in the UK and on October 28 in the US, through RCA Records. Its title is derived from a lyric in the song "Reptilia". The album received positive reviews upon its release and reached number four on the US Billboard 200, where it went on to sell 597,000 units by October 2006, earning a gold certification from the Recording Industry Association of America (RIAA). It also reached number two on the UK Albums Chart. Three singles were released from the album: "12:51", "Reptilia", and "The End Has No End".

== Recording ==
Immediately after touring for their debut album Is This It, the Strokes returned to the studio. They hired Radiohead producer Nigel Godrich, but fired him when, according to the band, their work together proved "soulless". Godrich said of the failed collaboration: "The problem there was that me and [singer Julian Casablancas] are just too similar, we're both control freaks. He wanted to do it his way, I wanted to do it my way, and obviously that's the point of me being there. And I'm saying 'Well, why am I here if you're not prepared to try and do it the way I want to do it?' We got on great, it was just one of those laughable things where it just doesn't work. I wanted them to change, and they didn't."

Those sessions were ultimately scrapped and the band returned to their original producer, Gordon Raphael. The Strokes had exactly three months of studio time left to record the album. Guitarist Nick Valensi stated that "the album would've ended up a lot better if we'd had another couple of weeks."

== Critical reception ==
Professional ratings
Aggregate scores
Source	Rating
Metacritic	77/100
Review scores
Source	Rating
AllMusic	4/5 stars
Blender	3/5 stars
Entertainment Weekly	B
The Guardian	3/5 stars
NME	9/10
Pitchfork	8.0/10
Q	5/5 stars
Rolling Stone	4/5 stars
The Rolling Stone Album Guide	4/5 stars
Spin	A−
Uncut	4/5 stars

The music of Room on Fire has been described as indie rock, garage rock revival, and new wave. The album received generally positive reviews from critics: on the review aggregating website Metacritic, it currently has a score of 77 out of 100 based on 31 reviews, which indicates "generally favorable reviews". However, in general, reviewers found the album too similar to Is This It. Rob Mitchum of Pitchfork gave the album an 8 out of 10, but stated that the band "have all but given birth to an identical twin." A positive review from Rolling Stone said that "the Strokes have resisted the temptation to hit the brakes, grow up and screw around with a sound that doesn't need fixing — yet." The review also stated that "if you want comfort and clarity, you're definitely in the wrong room. This record was built for thrills and speed." Dan Tallis of BBC Music gave it a favorable review and said, "Bands should think themselves lucky to achieve such heights just once in their careers. However, they've done all they could have done. They've made Is This It part two. It's more of the same plus extras. And I'm more than happy to settle for that."

Ben Thompson of The Observer gave it all five stars and said, "This is a feeling that can be inspired only by people making the absolute most of an opportunity to communicate: cutting through all the rubbish that surrounds them to make a clear and memorable artistic statement. And that the Strokes should have managed to do such a thing at this stage in their careers, is - I think - an achievement of real significance." Greg Milner of Spin gave it a score of eight out of ten and said that its "similarity to its predecessor ultimately bespeaks a purity of vision, not a dearth of new ideas." Jenny Tatone of Neumu gave it a score of nine stars out of ten and said, "The Strokes don't make the most original sounding music you've ever heard, but they make something that is only the Strokes." In his Consumer Guide, Robert Christgau gave the album a three-star honorable mention while picking out two songs from the album ("Between Love and Hate" and "What Ever Happened?") and stating simply, "Narcissism repeats itself."

Not all reviews were positive, however. Raoul Hernandez of The Austin Chronicle gave the album a score of two stars out of five and stated that "even the half-hearted retreads... cashing in on the notoriously unwashed NYC quintet's debut can't muster a wink." Iain Moffat of Playlouder gave the album only one star and said of the Strokes, "There's little of the pop sparkle that shone through the likes of 'The Modern Age' and 'Last Nite' even when - as with 'You Talk Way Too Much' - they're rewriting old material, and Julian's vocals are, to be blunt, awful, sounding uncomfortable to record and rather complacently nasal."

In 2013, Room On Fire was listed at number 360 on NME's list of the 500 greatest albums of all time. In 2018, the BBC included it in their list of "the acclaimed albums that nobody listens to any more".

=== Reappraisal ===
In later years, Room on Fire has received critical acclaim and is regarded by fans as one of the Strokes' best albums. In 2021, Pitchfork included Room on Fire on its list of album review scores they "would change if they could", upgrading its score from 8.0 to 9.2 out of 10, though they stated this would not change the actual score. Lane Brown of Pitchfork praised it as a "different, better album with major improvements over its predecessor", commending it for marking confident progress and "at least partially thwarting rock history's most inevitable backlash."

== Commercial performance ==
The album peaked at number four on the Billboard 200 in the US, and was later certified Gold by the RIAA in December 2003, and platinum certification for selling over one million units in June 2021.

== Track listing ==
All tracks are written by Julian Casablancas, with "Automatic Stop" co-written by Albert Hammond Jr.

Room on Fire track listing
No.	Title	Length
1.	"What Ever Happened?"	2:49
2.	"Reptilia"	3:39
3.	"Automatic Stop"	3:27
4.	"12:51"	2:33
5.	"You Talk Way Too Much"	3:06
6.	"Between Love & Hate"	3:16
7.	"Meet Me in the Bathroom"	2:56
8.	"Under Control"	3:07
9.	"The Way It Is"	2:21
10.	"The End Has No End"	3:05
11.	"I Can't Win"	2:42
Total length:		33:05

== Personnel ==
The Strokes

- Julian Casablancas – vocals
- Albert Hammond, Jr. – guitar
- Nick Valensi – guitar
- Nikolai Fraiture – bass guitar
- Fabrizio Moretti – drums

Production

- Gordon Raphael – producer
- Toshikazu Yoshioka – head engineer
- William Kelly – second engineer
- Greg Calbi – mastering
- Steve Fallone – mastering

Design

- Peter Phillips – cover art ("War/Game", used with permission and courtesy of Zoe Phillips)
- Colin Lane – photography
- Brett Kilroe – art direction

== Singles ==
Singles from Room on Fire
Title	Information
"12:51"	Released: October 6, 2003; Chart positions: No. 7 (UK Singles Chart) No. 15 (US Modern Rock)
"Reptilia"	Released: February 9, 2004; Chart positions: No. 17 (UK Singles Chart) No. 19 (US Modern Rock)
"The End Has No End"	Released: November 1, 2004; Chart positions: No. 27 (UK Singles Chart) No. 35 (US Modern Rock)

== Charts ==
=== Weekly charts ===
Weekly chart performance for Room on Fire
Chart (2003–2004)	Peak position
Australian Albums (ARIA)	6
Austrian Albums (Ö3 Austria)	14
Belgian Albums (Ultratop Flanders)	14
Belgian Albums (Ultratop Wallonia)	35
Canadian Albums (Billboard)	2
Danish Albums (Hitlisten)	16
Dutch Albums (Album Top 100)	23
Finnish Albums (Suomen virallinen lista)	25
French Albums (SNEP)	16
German Albums (Offizielle Top 100)	6
Irish Albums (IRMA)	1
Italian Albums (FIMI)	14
New Zealand Albums (RMNZ)	6
Norwegian Albums (VG-lista)	3
Portuguese Albums (AFP)	12
Scottish Albums (Official Charts)	1
Swedish Albums (Sverigetopplistan)	6
Swiss Albums (Schweizer Hitparade)	29
UK Albums (Official Charts)	2
US Billboard 200	4

=== Year-end charts ===
2003 year-end chart performance for Room on Fire
Chart (2003)	Position
UK Albums (OCC)	88

2004 year-end chart performance for Room on Fire
Chart (2004)	Position
UK Albums (OCC)	177

== Certifications ==
Certifications for Room on Fire
Region	Certification	Certified units/sales
Australia (ARIA)	Platinum	70,000^{‡}
Canada (Music Canada)	Gold	50,000^{^}
Japan (RIAJ)	Gold	100,000^{^}
New Zealand (RMNZ)	Gold	7,500^{^}
United Kingdom (BPI)	Platinum	300,000^{^}
United States (RIAA)	Platinum	1,000,000^{‡}
^{^} Shipments figures based on certification alone.^{‡} Sales+streaming figures based on certification alone.
