= Tessa (rapper) =

Danish rapper (born 1997)

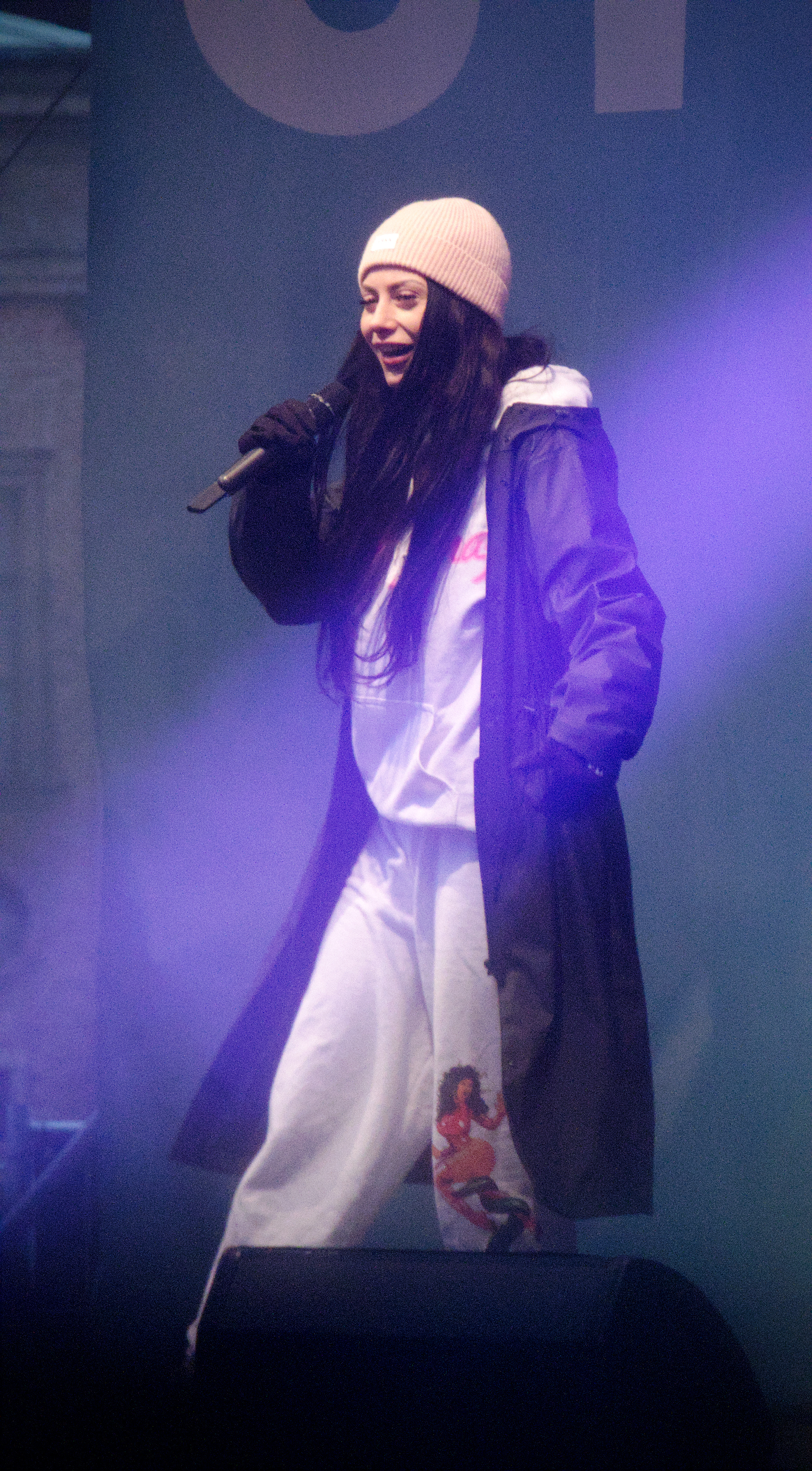
- Tessa in February 2023

Background information
- Born: Theresa Ann Fallesen; 8 September 1997 (age 29); Hundige, Denmark
- Genre: Hip hop
- Occupation: Rapper
- Years active: 2019 – present
- Labels: Universal Music Danmark; Artcore Records

Theresa Ann Fallesen (born 8 September 1997), known professionally as Tessa, is a Danish rapper.

== Early life ==
Tessa was born on 8 September 1997 and grew up with her mother in Greve, Zealand. Tessa's mother was diagnosed with breast cancer when Tessa was 9 years old, and they subsequently moved to Nørreby on Funen for quieter surroundings. Tessa was bullied at the new school. Called 'Tessa' by her mother throughout her life, she only became aware of her "real" name (Theresa Ann) as a young teenager. As a young teenager, she was inspired by the Danish rapper Natasja and the Trinidadian rapper Nicki Minaj, and she taught herself English and to rap by rapping American rap songs. In 2012, as a 15-year-old, Tessa committed a shoplifting in Odense, and she subsequently traveled to Copenhagen, where she moved in with her father in Askerød. She subsequently also committed shoplifting in a shopping center in Malmö, and then chose to move away from her father and live on the street. Tessa lived on the street in Copenhagen for approximately a year and a half, during which she supported herself by shoplifting and the help of friends and acquaintances. At 16, she decided to turn her life around and got an apartment and a job with a cleaning company. During her time on the streets, Tessa became a big fan of the Danish rap group, Kaliber, and through Instagram she got in touch with Jesper 'Livid' Helles, a rapper in the group. Through Tessa's Instagram profile, Livid saw Tessa's videos of herself miming to various rap songs, including Nicki Minaj, and he invited Tessa to join his project, Urban Grrls (a talent development program for young women in urban music), in early 2019. Tessa was among the 25 selected artists who were taught by Karen Mukupa and Jesper 'Livid' Helles. During the Urban Grrls process, Livid and Tessa entered into a management contract, and Livid became Tessa's manager.

On 15 April 2019, Tessa recorded her first freestyle with accompanying video, which was subsequently posted on Instagram, where it went viral.

== Career ==
=== 2019 ===
In June 2019, Tessa released her debut single "Snakker for Meget", and shortly afterwards she made her live debut at the opening party at the Countdown Stage at Roskilde Festival. In September 2019, Tessa released her second single "Okay" and her first music video. On 15 September, Tessa supported the American rapper Machine Gun Kelly at his concert in Vega in Copenhagen. In October 2019, Tessa released the single "Ben", which has been streamed over 9 million times on Spotify (and therefore goes under "Platinum"). "Ben" was named one of the "25 Danish Songs of the Year" by the music magazine Soundvenue.

=== 2020s ===
In December 2020, together with Orgi-E, she released the single "Blæstegnen", a tribute song to Copenhagen's Vestegn, which i.a. attracted attention for the accompanying video in which former Prime Minister Helle Thorning-Schmidt appears.

At the Danish Music Awards 2020, Tessa won the award 'New name of the year'. She was also nominated in the categories 'Danish Songwriter of the Year' and 'Danish Streaming Hit of the Year' with her single "Ben". Tessa was also nominated in the category 'Danish soloist of the year'. Earlier in 2020, she also won the award for 'New Name of the Year' at the 'ZULU Awards 2020'. At The Voice Radio Awards 2020, which was broadcast live on The Voice, Tessa walked away with all three awards she was nominated for: Role Model of the Year, Danish Streaming Artist of the Year (YouSee Music Award), and the coveted The Voice Award.

In early July 2021 Tessa performed at the Roskilde Festival for the second time, while in the following autumn season she held her first headline concerts. On 14 November 2021, she received the MTV Europe Music Award for Best Nordic Act in Budapest, Hungary, marking the first win for a Danish artist in that category in twenty years; and the following Saturday she was awarded the Danish Music Award for the live revelation artist of the year. IFPI Danmark awarded her four additional platinum and four gold albums, equivalent to 540,000 certified singles. Additionally, in the Danish Top-40, she had placed another eleven entries in the top ten in about four years.

In early 2022, Tessa released a little over a minute long diss track, in which she, somewhat surprisingly, disses Thomas Blachman in the crudest way due to an offensive comment from Blachman in 2021. In May 2023, Tessa released her debut album, which, like the documentary series about her, is called Tessas Hævn. The album includes the song "Engletårer", in which Tessa recounts two sexual assaults she suffered as a teenager.

== Discography ==
=== Studio albums ===
Title	Details	Peak chart positions	Certifications
Title	Details	DEN	Certifications
Tessas Hævn	Released: 26 May 2023; Label: Universal; Format: CD, download	3	DEN: Gold
Tessas Hævn (Igen Bitch)	Released: 7 July 2023; Label: Universal; Format: CD, download	9	
"—" denotes an album that did not chart or was not released in that territory.

=== Singles ===
Year	Title	Peak positions	Certifications	Album
Year	Title	DEN	Certifications	Album
2019	"Snakker For Meget"	—		
2019	"Okay"	25		
2019	"Ben"	5	DEN: 3× Platinum	
2020	"Sjakalina"	7	DEN: Platinum	
2020	"Vil Du Med" (Suspekt feat. Tessa)	3		
2020	"Så'n der"	3		
2020	"Tættere end vi tror" (P3 feat. Tessa, Lukas Graham, Mads Langer, Jada, Benjamin Hav, Christopher, Clara & Don Stefano)	1	DEN: Platinum	
2020	"Glo på mig"	8		
2020	"Bål"	9		
2020	"Ghetto Fabulous"	8		
2020	"Til Banken" (Natasja x Tessa x Karen Mukupa)	4	DEN: 2× Platinum	
2020	"Blæstegnen" (feat. Orgi-E)	11		
2021	"Mums"	5		
2021	"Luftkys" (Burhan G feat. Tessa)	34		
2022	"Engangspik"	5	DEN: Gold	
2022	"TCM"	35		
2023	"Betalt" (ft. Lamin & Benny Jamz)	19		Tessas Hævn
2023	"Ding Dong"	33		Tessas Hævn
2023	"Hvor som helst"	10	DEN: Gold	Tessas Hævn (Igen Bitch)
2024	"Rick Ross Pt. 2" (with Medina)	5		Non-album single
"—" denotes an album that did not chart or was not released in that territory.
