= The Teenagers (French band) =

French synth-pop band

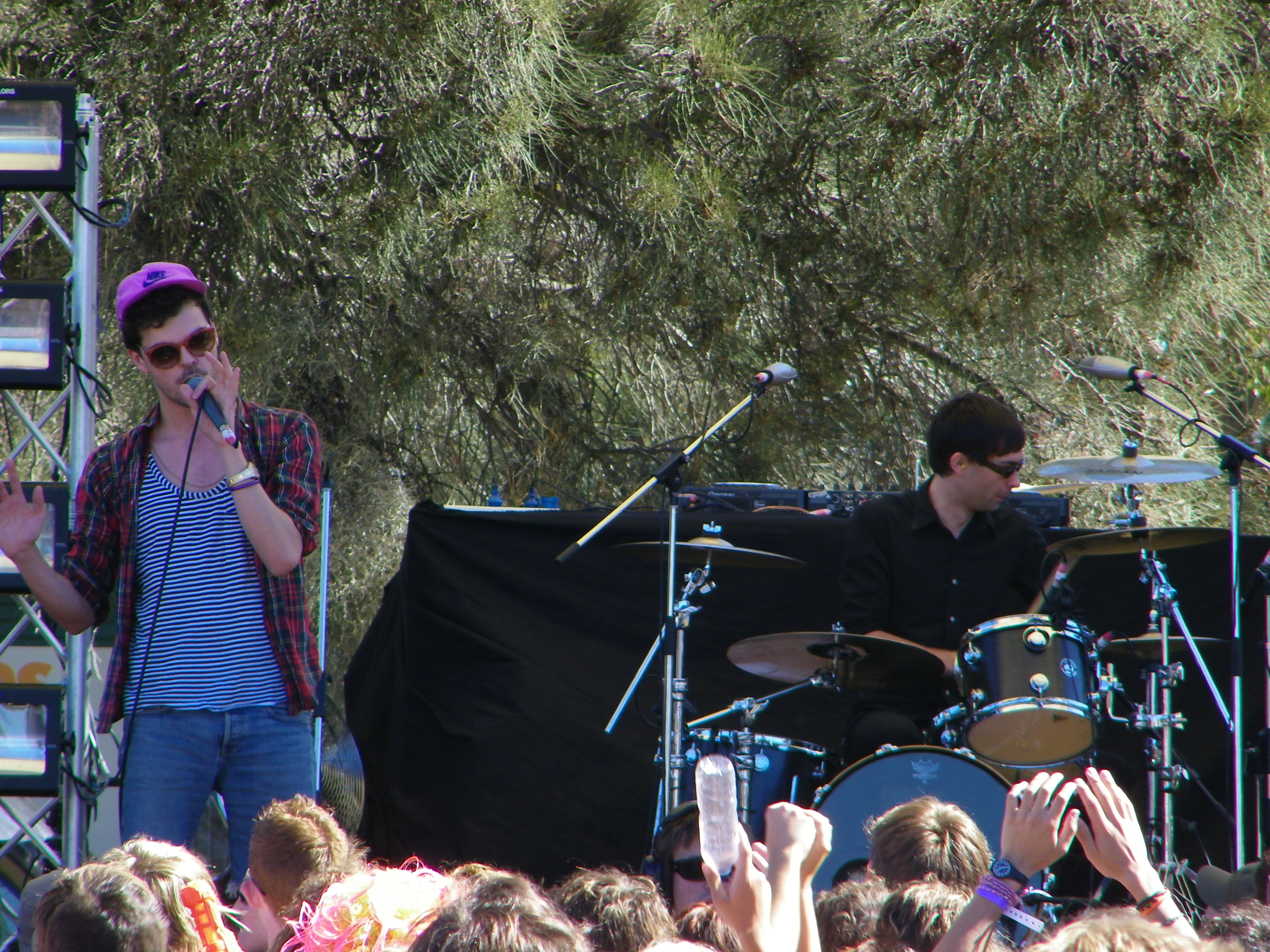
- The Teenagers performing in Mandurah, Western Australia in December 2008

Background information
- Origin: Paris, France
- Genres: Synth-pop; indie pop; electro; new wave; indie rock; post-punk revival; alternative pop; alternative rock; electronic; rock; pop; electropop
- Years active: 2005–2020 • 2025-present
- Labels: Merok Records; XL Recordings; Summer Lovers Unlimited
- Members: Michael Szpiner; Dorian Dumont; Quentin Delafon

The Teenagers is a French synth-pop trio formed in late 2005, originally as a joke. They gained notoriety with the song "Homecoming", both for its catchy sound and for its explicit content. Their debut album Reality Check was released in the UK on 17 March 2008 and 18 March 2008 in the rest of Europe and the United States. On 12 October 2020, the band announced that they were no longer active and had not been for some time, and posted a link to a farewell song titled "Do You Remember". In 2025, they announced a comeback, with new music releasing in 2026.

== Critical reception ==
The NME praised the band's "self-aware, smart sentiments, played out against a backdrop of lush, danceable, huggable pop." They have been said to "sound like Kraftwerk doing the soundtrack to a porno film" Their music is a mix of an electropop sound, comical lyrics and potent melodies. Their quirky fashion sense is inspired by the eccentric East London style, and copied by their cult fanbase. The track "Homecoming" was elected fourth-best song of 2007 by NME. During 2008, The Teenagers toured the globe (25 countries, 100 cities) to promote their debut album "Reality Check". They played at the Reading Festival (UK), at Glastonbury (UK) and Summersonic (Japan) and have been invited as a support band by Vampire Weekend in the US and Europe.

== Discography ==
=== Studio albums ===
- Reality Check (2008)

=== Extended plays ===
- The World Is Not Fair (2007)
- "Oversharing" (2026)

=== Singles ===
- "Homecoming" (2007)
- "Starlett Johansson" (2007)
- "Fuck Nicole" (US/Canada only release) (2008)
- "Love No" (2008)
- "Make It Happen" (2008)
- "Made Of" (2010)
- "Secret Crush" (2012)
- "Do You Remember" (2020)
- "Serious" (2026)
- "Do You Remember" (2026)

=== Remixes ===
- GoodBooks – "The Illness" (2007)
- Lo-Fi-Fnk – "City" (2007)
- Au Revoir Simone – "Fallen Snow" (2007)
- The Black Ghosts – "Face" (2007)
- Air – "Mer Du Japon" (2007)
- New Young Pony Club – "The Bomb" (2007)
- Shiny Toy Guns – "Don't Cry Out" (2007)
- Chromeo – "Bonafied Lovin" (2007)
- Scanners – "Lowlife"
- Goldfrapp – "Happiness" (2008)
- Simian Mobile Disco – "It's the Beat" (2008)
- Vampire Weekend – "Cape Cod Kwassa Kwassa" (2008)
- Britney Spears – "Womanizer" (2008)
- Fall Out Boy – "America's Suitehearts" (2008)
- Black Gold – "Plans and Reveries" (2008)
- Phoenix – "1901" (2009)
- Au Revoir Simone – "Shadows" (Unknown)
- Kate Nash – "Kiss That Grrrl" (2010)
- Alizée – "Les Collines (Never leave you)" (2011)
- Solomun – "Forever" (2012)
