= 12:51 (The Strokes song) =

2003 single by the Strokes

Single by The Strokes

from the album Room on Fire
- B-side: "The Way It Is" (home recording)
- Released: October 6, 2003
- Studio: TMF, New York City
- Genre: New wave
- Length: 2:27
- Label: Rough Trade; RCA
- Songwriter: Julian Casablancas
- Producer: Gordon Raphael

The Strokes singles chronology
"Someday" (2002)	"12:51" (2003)	"Reptilia" (2004)

Music video
- "12:51" on YouTube

"12:51" is a song by American rock band the Strokes. It was released on October 6, 2003, as the first single from their second studio album, Room on Fire (2003). The track was written by Julian Casablancas and produced by Gordon Raphael. It peaked at number 7 on the UK Singles Chart.

== Background ==
Julian Casablancas admitted that he took inspiration from Sonic Youth's 1994 song "Bull in the Heather" when writing "12:51", once joking that he was "totally ripping it off."

== Critical reception ==
"12:51" received positive reviews from critics. Billboard's Wes Orshoski wrote of the song: "Julian Casablancas' sleepy vocals arrive in synch with a nerdy, very '80s keyboard that sounds so much cooler than it probably should against guitarists Nick Valensi and Albert Hammond Jr.'s raw, fast strumming, the throbbing bass of Nikolai Fraiture and drummer Fabrizio Moretti's cool swing beat." AllMusic's Heather Phares wrote that "its whistling, synth-like guitars and handclaps are undeniably catchy, but at first, the song seems to be searching for a structure. Eventually, though, it becomes sneakily addictive -- it's a stealth pop song."

The song peaked at number 15 on the Billboard Alternative Songs chart.

== Music video ==
The music video for "12:51" was directed by Roman Coppola and was inspired by the 1982 film Tron.

== Track listing ==
No.	Title	Length
1.	"12:51"	2:27
2.	"The Way It Is (Home Recording)"	1:16

== Personnel ==
- Julian Casablancas – vocals
- Nick Valensi – guitar
- Albert Hammond Jr. – guitar
- Nikolai Fraiture – bass
- Fabrizio Moretti – drums

== Charts ==
Chart (2003)	Peak position
Canada (Nielsen SoundScan)	30
Ireland (IRMA)	22
Netherlands (Single Top 100)	40
Scottish Singles Sales (Official Charts)	7
Sweden (Sverigetopplistan)	39
UK Singles (Official Charts)	7
UK Indie (Official Charts)	2
US Alternative Airplay (Billboard)	15

== Certifications ==
Region	Certification	Certified units/sales
United Kingdom (BPI)	Silver	200,000^{‡}
^{‡} Sales+streaming figures based on certification alone.
