= The Moonies =

English alternative rock band

- Origin: Liverpool, England
- Genres: Alternative rock
- Years active: 2001–2005
- Labels: Plastic Boot Records; Vinyl Junkie Records
- Past members: Mike Berry; Steve Banks; Ryan Clarke; Steve Charmley

The Moonies were an alternative rock band from Liverpool, England, active from 2001 to 2005. The band comprised singer/guitarist Steve Banks, singer/bassist Ryan Clarke, guitarist Steve Charmley, and drummer Mike Berry.

== History ==
Banks, Clarke, and Berry were members of the Moggs, who released an album titled Sweet Corn & Soft Porn for Foulplay Records in 2000. After losing their recording contract, the band recruited Charmley in 2001 and adopted the name Moonies as a tribute to Keith Moon. The band signed with EMI under this name and was known for its emo-oriented sound, as well as lyrics and fashion styles reminiscent of 1960s British rock.

The band released several singles in the UK starting in 2002 and launched the album It's Amazing! in Japan in 2003, produced, engineered and mixed by Lance Thomas. They toured the UK multiple times with the Buzzcocks and recorded an unreleased song featuring Buzzcocks singer Pete Shelley. Charmley departed from the Moonies in 2004, followed by Banks in 2005, after which the group disbanded.

== Members ==
- Steve Banks (vocals/guitar)
- Ryan Clarke (vocals/bass)
- Mike Berry (drums)
- Steve Charmley (guitar)

== Discography ==
Albums

- The Rock and Roll EP (EP, 2003)
- It's Amazing! (2003)

Singles

- "Blue' (2002)
- "Cool" (2002)
- "I Would Give It All Up for Your Love" (2003)
