= Is This It =

- International cover

Studio album by the Strokes
- Released: July 30, 2001
- Recorded: March–April 2001
- Studios: Transporterraum, New York City
- Genres: Indie rock; garage rock revival; post-punk revival
- Length: 35:48
- Labels: RCA; Rough Trade
- Producer: Gordon Raphael

The Strokes chronology
The Modern Age (2001)	Is This It (2001)	Room on Fire (2003)

Alternative cover
- US cover

Singles from Is This It
- 1. "Hard to Explain" Released: June 25, 2001; 2. "Last Nite" Released: October 23, 2001; 3. "Someday" Released: September 23, 2002

Is This It is the debut studio album by American rock band the Strokes. It was first released on July 30, 2001, in Australia, with RCA Records handling the release internationally and Rough Trade Records handling the United Kingdom release. It was recorded at Transporterraum in New York City with producer Gordon Raphael during March and April 2001. For their debut, the band strived to capture a simple sound that was not significantly enhanced in the studio. Building on their 2001 EP The Modern Age, the band members molded compositions largely through live takes during recording sessions, while lead singer and songwriter Julian Casablancas continued to detail the lives and relationships of urban youth in his lyrics.

After completing the album, the Strokes embarked on a promotional world tour before its release. The album was released progressively to coincide with their tour dates, with it being released in Japan on August 22 and the United Kingdom on August 27. After the September 11 attacks, the American compact disc release was delayed from September 25 to October 9 and had its track list amended, with the song "New York City Cops" being removed and replaced with the newly written track "When It Started"; however, the American vinyl release still includes the track as a result of its release falling on September 11. Three singles were released from the album: "Hard to Explain", "Last Nite", and "Someday".

Promoted by the music press for its twin-guitar interplay and melodic, pop-influenced sound, Is This It peaked at number 33 on the US Billboard 200 and number two on the UK Albums Chart, going on to achieve platinum status in several countries. The album received widespread acclaim upon release, with critics praising it for its charisma and rhythm, which often referenced the works of 1970s garage rock bands. The release of the album was a watershed moment, and crucial in the reinvention of post-millennium guitar music. As a result, Is This It is widely considered to be one of the most influential albums of all time, and has appeared in many publications' lists of the best albums of the 2000s and of all time.

== Background ==
In 1998, the Strokes consisted of singer Julian Casablancas, guitarist Nick Valensi, bassist Nikolai Fraiture, and drummer Fabrizio Moretti. Casablancas's stepfather and Moretti's and Fraiture's older brothers introduced the quartet to the music of reggae artist Bob Marley, protopunk group the Velvet Underground, and alternative rock band Jane's Addiction. Discussing the formative stages of the group, Moretti noted, "Our music was, like, [the Doors'], but trying to be classical. We all took music classes and tried writing songs, and when we put them together they were this crazy amalgam of insane ideas that we thought was really cool." In 1998, Albert Hammond Jr., whom Casablancas knew from his time at a Swiss boarding school, moved to New York City to attend film school and joined the Strokes as a second guitarist. His arrival provided the catalyst for the band's musical and emotional evolution.

By 2000, all band members had part-time jobs and were practicing new material several nights a week in a small hired recording space. In the fall of that year, their demo caught the attention of Ryan Gentles, a talent booker at New York City's Mercury Lounge. He scheduled the Strokes for four December gigs. With support from personal mentor JP Bowersock and producer Gordon Raphael, the band recorded three tracks which later appeared on Is This It: "The Modern Age", "Last Nite", and "Barely Legal". British label Rough Trade Records was impressed by the songs and released them as a January 2001 extended play titled The Modern Age. Music press reaction was very positive and the Strokes embarked on a sold-out UK tour, followed by US support slots for alternative rock groups Doves and Guided by Voices. Gentles quit his job to manage the band full-time and, in March 2001, the Strokes signed to RCA Records after a protracted bidding war.

== Recording and production ==
After the deal with RCA, the Strokes started working with Gil Norton, who had produced recordings for alternative rock group Pixies. Although the two parties developed a rapport, the band were unhappy with the results of preliminary sessions which they thought sounded "too clean" and "too pretentious"; the three songs recorded with Norton were scrapped. Like The Modern Age, Is This It was eventually recorded with Gordon Raphael at Transporterraum in Manhattan's East Village in New York City. The studio is located in a basement with poor lighting, but despite its poor infrastructure, it includes modern Pro Tools digital audio workstation hardware. The Strokes liked Raphael's lack of ego and formed a good collaborative relationship with the producer.

"I just wanted to write music that could touch people. [As] a songwriter, you play a few chords and sing a melody that's been done a thousand times, and now you're a singer-songwriter. I think it takes a little more than that to do something that matters. And I wish I could write a song where all the parts work. When you hear a song like that, it's like finding a new friend."

— Julian Casablancas

Before recording started, the Strokes and Raphael organized a listening session with the musical material Hammond and Casablancas had brought to show the tone and energy they liked. At the meeting, the band said they wanted to go in a different direction than contemporary music. Casablancas wanted Is This It to sound like "a band from the past that took a time trip into the future to make their record". The approach for the album became more studied than that of The Modern Age. The group wanted the majority of songs to sound like them playing live, while they requested a few others to be like "a weird, in-studio production with a drum machine, even though no drum machine was used". The songs of the latter type were done track-by-track and were crafted into non-standard rock arrangements. Raphael's background in industrial music played a large part in the album's conception.

During six weeks in the studio, the Strokes' gritty sound became the emphasis of the sessions. The band usually recorded songs only once, based on Casablancas's preference for "raw efficiency". RAT effects pedals and overdriving amplifiers were used at times, "taking sounds, disintegrating them and then bringing them back". The band wanted things to be only slightly stressed, with no heavy-handedness in terms of studio effects; only distortion and reverse echo were widely used. Throughout the process, Raphael improvised according to the reactions that he got from the group. At one point, he had to cope with the threat of eviction from his Transporterraum studio, but once the Strokes received backing from RCA, time and money were no longer pressing concerns. The label's A&R delegate initially did not like what had been recorded and felt that the album was not going to be professional enough. The producer and the band were given complete control only when Casablancas persuaded the delegate by playing him some of the new material on a boom box.

Inspired by the Velvet Underground's production and the direct approach of punk rock band Ramones, the miking scheme for the drum kit included only three microphones: one above it, one for the bass drum, and one in the corner of the studio. It was crafted to capture "a compressed, explosive sound". On Moretti's advice, the transfer from the two loud guitars and the rumble of the bass picked up by the drum-kit microphones was not eliminated. The guitars were recorded more simply; Hammond and Valensi both used Fender DeVille amps on opposite sides of the room, while Raphael positioned a mic on each. The sound was then fed directly into a preamp with no equalization. Valensi commented that guitar teacher and mentor Bowersock was invaluable because he was articulating things to the producer that the group could not. While the rest of the Strokes played to a click track, Casablancas sang through a small Peavey practice amp to retain a sense of low fidelity on the album. Raphael mixed as he went along to maintain control of the record until the final mastering stage; the producer aimed to show the Strokes a final product as soon as the band finished performing a track.

== Composition ==
=== Lyrics ===
'Barely Legal'
"Barely Legal" references a girl who just reached the legal sexual age. It also includes simple upbeat drumming similar to a drum machine's output and guitars in the style of Britpop.

Casablancas's writing discusses life and relationships of young people in New York City. Exemplifying this theme, "The Modern Age" is a rant about the oddness of modern life. "Barely Legal" concerns a girl who has just arrived at the age of consent. Discussing its risqué nature, Moretti has stated, "It should be taken the way you interpret it. The lyrics mean different things to different people." "Alone, Together" continues the sexual theme by dropping hints about cunnilingus, while the yelp at the start of "New York City Cops" was created as a pastiche of rock band Aerosmith. "Soma" takes influence from the fictional drug in Aldous Huxley's 1932 novel Brave New World. Here Casablancas is discussing drug use to fit in with the cool crowd. During the studio sessions, Casablancas introduced tracks with comic lines and some quips were used when the album was mixed.

=== Music ===
Musically, Is This It has been described as a garage rock revival, indie rock, and post-punk revival album. All songs on the album were mixed using 11 or fewer audio tracks. According to Valensi, the album contains "no gimmicks, no tricks" to try to get the listener to like the compositions. It opens with the title track, which features a simple, metronomic drum line, a recurring feature in the rest of the record. Containing one of the slowest tempos, "Is This It" is the Strokes' attempt at a ballad. "The Modern Age" follows and includes a guitar riff accompanied by a complementary drum line. Its staccato verse is followed by an upbeat, singalong chorus and a guitar solo. Discussing the album's simplicity and measured approach, Valensi has commented, "We don't put in a guitar solo just to have one." "Soma" incorporates jerky rhythms and starts and ends with the same guitar and drum chimes, while "Barely Legal" contains some of the album's softer guitar melodies inspired by Britpop as well as drumming patterns that evoke the sound of primitive 1980s drum machines.

The fifth track on the record, "Someday", is infused with rockabilly elements and interlocking guitar lines, the latter a recurring element of Is This It. "Alone, Together" is driven by a staccato rhythm, and climaxes first with a guitar solo, then a repeat of the central guitar hook. "Last Nite" is also a guitar-driven song, but leans towards pop music influences. At its core, there are reggae-inspired rhythm guitar lines played by Hammond, and studio noise effects. The rhythm section plays simple interlocking notes and beats. Like "Soma", "Hard to Explain" contains processed drum tracks using dynamic range compression and equalization studio techniques to make them sound like a drum machine. The song incorporates spliced ad-libbing extras from Casablancas, a feature also used on "New York City Cops". "Trying Your Luck", the album's mellowest point, follows and shows more melancholic vocals. The last track on Is This It, "Take It or Leave It", is the only song in which Hammond used the bridge pickup of his Fender Stratocaster guitar.

== Packaging ==
The international cover art of Is This It is by Colin Lane and features a photograph of a woman's rear and hip, with a leather-gloved hand suggestively resting on it. The model was Lane's then-girlfriend, who explained that the photoshoot was spontaneous and happened after she came out of the shower naked. Lane recalled that a stylist had left the glove in his apartment and noted, "We did about 10 shots. There was no real inspiration, I was just trying to take a sexy picture." The result was included in the book The Greatest Album Covers of All Time, in which Grant Scott, one of the editors, noted influences from the works of Helmut Newton and Guy Bourdin. Scott concluded, "It's either a stylish or graphically strong cover or a sexist Smell the Glove travesty." Although British retail chains HMV and Woolworths objected to the photograph, they stocked the album without amendment.

For the American market and the October 2001 release, the cover art of Is This It was changed to a psychedelic photograph of subatomic particle tracks in a bubble chamber. The image first appeared on new age artist Bruce Becvar's 1988 album The Nature of Things. The same image appears on the cover of The Scientist as Rebel by theoretical physicist Freeman Dyson. A portion of the image also appeared on Prince's 1990 album Graffiti Bridge. RCA product manager Dave Gottlieb commented that "it was straight up a band decision", while Gentles indicated that Casablancas had wanted it to appear globally. According to the band's manager, the frontman phoned him before the Japan and Europe release and said, "I found something even cooler than the ass picture." At the time, the Lane photograph was already at the presses and was included in the July and August 2001 versions. The Strokes' 2003 biography mentions the fear of objections from America's conservative retail industry and right-wing lobby as reasons for the artwork's alteration. The back cover art was also changed to a painting called View of the Citadel on the Capitol by Jacques Carlu.

The group deliberately left out the grammatically correct question mark from the album title because aesthetically, "it did not look right". The booklet insert contains stylized separate portraits of the Strokes, Raphael, Gentles, and Bowersock, all photographed by Lane.

== Promotion and release ==
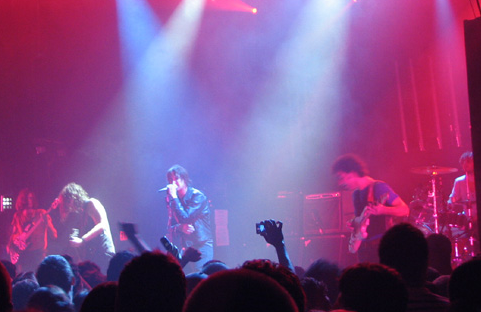
The Strokes in concert, 2006

Following the album's completion, the Strokes performed at Philadelphia music venues every Wednesday of May 2001. The band revealed the track listing of Is This It on May 15. A June headlining tour of the UK and Ireland was also confirmed, and almost immediately after the announcement, some venues sold out. "Hard to Explain" was named as the album's first single with a release date of June 25 to coincide with the tour. At the time, Moretti stated, "In Britain, people are much more responsive ... I'm so psyched to be going back, every show we played people were enjoying it. There's a lot of people here in America who think we've had it too easy, but they have never really heard the music."

Following the Strokes' June 20 show in Glasgow, Moretti suffered a fall and was hospitalized with a broken hand. Two of the last five UK gigs were canceled and a friend of the group, Matt Romano, flew to England to replace the injured drummer in the remaining concerts. In a press release, Gentles explained, "They will only carry on if they feel that they are 100% after rehearsing with Matt, as they wouldn't offer anything less to their fans." With Romano as a substitute, the band managed to satisfy the outstanding commitments. Live recorded versions of "Hard to Explain", its B-side "New York City Cops", and "Last Nite" from The Modern Age aired on the UK music show Top of the Pops on July 6, 2001. The Strokes were added to the main stage at the T in the Park festival in Scotland on July 7 after alternative rock group Weezer pulled out. A large part of the month of July was spent performing in cities in the West Coasts of America and Canada.

Is This It was released in Australia on July 30, 2001, to capitalize on the Strokes' recent tour of the country supporting You Am I. The record was streamed on Australian websites by the band's distributor BMG and remained available for listening even after the CD release. Geoff Travis, head of the Strokes' UK label Rough Trade, commented that the Australian continent had "special dispensation" and that an export ban was put in place to ensure no interferences with release plans in the rest of the world. The Japanese release date of August 22 was timed to occur after two one-off shows by the band at the Summer Sonic Festival, while the UK release of August 27 coincided with the Reading and Leeds Festivals. The September 11 terrorist attacks in New York City postponed the group's CMJ Music Marathon performance, and shifted RCA's US release of Is This It from September 25 to October 9. The Strokes chose to replace the song "New York City Cops" on the CD version of the album with a newly recorded song, "When It Started", after they witnessed the "valiant response" of the city's police department during the tragedy. The vinyl release retained the original track list, as a result of its release falling on September 11.. The song would later appear on the soundtrack album Music from and Inspired by Spider-Man (2002).

The song "Last Nite" was released as the second single from the album, in November 2001. The single was the group's first to enter the American charts, reaching the top five on the U.S. Modern Rock Tracks chart in late 2001. Meanwhile, the single obtained moderate success in the UK, peaking at number 14 on the UK Singles Chart. The song "Someday" was released as the third single from the album. It peaked at number 17 on the U.S. Alternative Songs chart and at number 27 on the U.K. Singles Chart.

== Reception ==
=== Critical ===
Professional ratings
Aggregate scores
Source	Rating
Metacritic	91/100
Review scores
Source	Rating
AllMusic	5/5 stars
Blender	4/5 stars
Entertainment Weekly	A−
The Guardian	4/5 stars
NME	5/5 stars
Pitchfork	9.1/10
Q	5/5 stars
Rolling Stone	4/5 stars
The Rolling Stone Album Guide	5/5 stars
The Village Voice	A−

Is This It received widespread critical acclaim; aggregating website Metacritic reports a normalized rating of 91, based on 26 critical reviews. Joe Levy of Rolling Stone explained that the record is "the stuff of which legends are made", and summed it up as "more joyful and intense than anything else I've heard this year". Robert Christgau, writing in The Village Voice, described the Strokes as "a great groove band", and noted that "the beats implode, clashing/resolving with punky brevity and gnarly faux simplicity". In a perfect 10 review, NME reviewer John Robinson indicated that Is This It was one of the best debut LPs by a guitar band during the past 20 years. In contrast, Jon Monks of Stylus commented that its shallowness prevents it from ever being called a "classic". In his favorable A− review, David Browne of Entertainment Weekly conceded that he did not know whether the Strokes would have a long-term impact, but noted that, at the time, the record "just feels right, and sometimes that's enough".

Mark Lepage of Blender claimed that Is This It is similar to the works of 1970s bands the Velvet Underground, Television and the Feelies. Pitchfork's Ryan Schreiber suggested that, while the work of the Velvet Underground is an obvious inspiration for the Strokes, the band's only similarity to the other groups is the confidence with which they perform. AllMusic's Heather Phares concluded, "Granted, their high-fashion appeal and faultless influences ... have 'critics' darlings' written all over them. But like the similarly lauded Elastica and Supergrass before them, the Strokes don't rehash the sounds that inspire them—they remake them in their own image." Rob Bolton of Exclaim! gave the album a mixed review, stating, "it’s really too bad that this album is such a bore. Sure, there’s a couple of somewhat catchy songs, but not only does this album not live up to the excessive hype (in fairness, no album could), it is completely uninspiring."

Is This It was named the best album of 2001 by Billboard, CMJ, Entertainment Weekly, NME, Playlouder, and Time. Magnet, Q, and The New Yorker included it in their respective unnumbered shortlists of the best records issued that year. It figured highly in other end-of-year best album lists: at number two by The Herald, at number three by Mojo, at number five by The New York Times, at number eight by Rolling Stone and by USA Today, at number nine by The Boston Phoenix, and at number ten by Kludge. The record featured at number two behind Bob Dylan's Love and Theft in The Village Voice's 2001 Pazz & Jop critics' poll, which aggregated the votes of 621 prominent reviewers. In 2002, Is This It was named Best Album at the NME Awards and Best International Album at the Meteor Music Awards. It was nominated in the latter category at the Brit Awards, where the Strokes won Best International Newcomer and received a nomination in the Best International Group category. The same year, the quintet won Band of the Year and Best New Act at the NME Awards and was nominated in the latter category at the MTV Europe Music Awards.

=== Commercial ===
Is This It was a commercial success and entered the UK Albums Chart at number two after first week sales of 48,393 copies. The record was listed at number 71 on the UK Albums Chart for 2001 and was certified gold by the British Phonographic Industry after charting continuously from its release in August to the end of the year. In the US, Is This It entered the Billboard 200 at number 74 after selling 16,000 units in the first week. 20,000 copies were shipped in America per week from October 2001 to January 2002, when a performance by the Strokes on the nationwide TV show Saturday Night Live caused a temporary rise in sales. A 60% increase allowed the album to reach a peak of number 33 on the Billboard 200 from its previous high of 63.

Is This It was certified gold by the Recording Industry Association of America in February 2002 for shipments of 500,000 copies in the US, and by the Canadian Recording Industry Association in April for 50,000 units in Canada. In 2002, the album attained platinum status in the UK and in Australia for sales of 300,000 and 70,000 copies respectively. The average US weekly sales were 7,000 by October 2002, when the reissue of the album with a bonus DVD caused an increase. By October 2003, the record had spent 58 weeks on the Billboard 200 since its release two years earlier, selling 900,000 copies in America; two million copies were sold worldwide. Is This It was certified platinum in Canada in 2004 after 100,000 units were shipped there. By the start of 2006, the album had sold over 600,000 copies in UK and over one million units in the US.

== Legacy ==
=== Influence ===
"Probably the most important rock album of the past 10 years: it prised the zeitgeist away from nu-metal, restored the pre-eminence of rattling neo-new-wave, and was the chief catalyzing influence on Arctic Monkeys."

— The Guardian in 2007, on the importance of Is This It to guitar bands and alternative music during the 2000s

Gary Mulholland of The Observer considers the release of Is This It a "world-changing moment" and notes that its impact was "immediate and dramatic" on both music and attire. BBC Radio 1's Zane Lowe suggests that the album moved popular opinion from DJs and pop music to "skinny jeans and guitars", "the template for rock 'n' roll in the modern day". Tam Gunn of Fact agrees and explains that it "caused a sea change" in mainstream music in the US and the UK, while Anthony Miccio of Stylus points out that the Strokes' success created the commercial context for "other new-wavers" to flourish. Rolling Stone writes that Is This It inspired "a ragged revolt" in Britain, led by the Libertines and Arctic Monkeys, and continued its influence in the US on the success of bands like Kings of Leon. The Observer shares a similar view and concludes that "a fine brood of heirs", like the Libertines and Franz Ferdinand, would not have existed and been successful if the Strokes had not reinvigorated "rock's obsession with having a good time". Jared Followill of Kings of Leon notes that the album was one of the main reasons that he wanted to get into a band; he states, "The title track was one of the first basslines I learned ... I was just 15 at the time."

Jed Gottlieb of the Boston Herald argues that, although Is This It provided substantial musical influence, its biggest success was in revamping the music industry and making A&R delegates scout and promote alternative bands. Gunn links the success of alternative music in British charts throughout the 2000s to the album, but notes that "the copyists" could never match the attention to detail and heartfelt emotion of the Strokes. Mulholland adds that even the pop stars of that decade who rediscovered disco, electro, and synthpop owe a debt to the record, because its commercial success "made every forgotten art-pop experiment of the late 70s and early 80s instantly hip and ripe for reinvention". Hamish MacBain of NME writes that "the western world has moved on, and is now swinging to the tune of Is This It", while Pitchfork's Joe Colly suggests that "you only capture this kind of a lightning in a bottle once". Gunn concludes that, while the status of the album as the 2000s' most influential guitar record may be "a double-edged sword" because of poor quality copyists, its status as the decade's best pop album should not be in doubt.

=== Accolades ===
In 2003, Is This It was ranked at number seven in NME's editorial staff list of the 100 Best Albums. In 2005, Spin placed it at number 100 in its list of the 100 Greatest Albums, 1985–2005, while Stylus included it at number four in its list of the Top 50 Albums of 2000–2005. In 2006, Is This It was ranked at number 48 by The Observer in the publication's list of The 50 Albums That Changed Music, while Mojo featured it at number 33 in its list of 100 Modern Classics, 1993–2006. In 2007, Q included the record at number 21 in its editorial staff list of the 21 Albums That Changed Music. In 2008, Entertainment Weekly ranked it at number 34 in its list of the 100 Best Albums, 1983–2008.

In 2009, Is This It was ranked as the best record of the 2000s by NME, ahead of the Libertines' Up the Bracket, and at number two by Rolling Stone, behind Radiohead's Kid A, in their respective lists decided by the publications' staff and music industry members. FACT placed it at number two behind Burial's Untrue in its editorial list of the 100 Best: Albums of the Decade, while Billboard featured it at number three in its critics' picks of the 20 Best Albums of the 2000s. The same year, The Observer included Is This It at number four in its Albums of the Decade list, while Uncut ranked it at number five in its list of The 150 Greatest Albums of the 21st Century. The Times placed it at number six in its list of The 100 Best Pop Albums of the Noughties, while Pitchfork featured it at number seven in its staff list of The Top 200 Albums of the 2000s. In 2010, Stylus ranked Is This It at number six in its list of the Top Albums of the previous decade. The record is included in both The Guardian's "1000 Albums To Hear Before You Die" and the book 1001 Albums You Must Hear Before You Die. In 2019, Is This It was ranked second on The Guardian's 100 Best Albums of the 21st Century list. Rolling Stone ranked it at number 367 in its 2003 list of The 500 Greatest Albums of All Time, significantly raising the album's ranking to number 199 in the 2012 revision. In the 2020 reboot of the list, Rolling Stone raised the rank of Is This It higher to number 114. In 2024, Apple Music ranked it at number 68 on its 100 Best Albums list. The following year, Rolling Stone placed Is This It at number ten in The 250 Greatest Albums of the 21st Century So Far list.

== Track listing ==
=== Original release ===
All tracks are written by Julian Casablancas.

Is This It track listing
No.	Title	Length
1.	"Is This It"	2:31
2.	"The Modern Age"	3:28
3.	"Soma"	2:33
4.	"Barely Legal"	3:54
5.	"Someday"	3:03
6.	"Alone, Together"	3:08
7.	"Last Nite"	3:13
8.	"Hard to Explain"	3:44
9.	"New York City Cops"	3:31
10.	"Trying Your Luck"	3:22
11.	"Take It or Leave It"	3:16
Total length:		36:28

Notes

- "New York City Cops" is replaced with "When It Started" for CD releases in the United States and some CD releases in Canada.
- A bonus DVD video portion of the reissue contains music videos for the album's three singles and two previously unreleased live performances of the Strokes on MTV2.

== Personnel ==
Credits taken from liner notes.

The Strokes

- Julian Casablancas – vocals
- Nick Valensi – guitar
- Albert Hammond Jr. – guitar
- Nikolai Fraiture – bass guitar
- Fab Moretti – drums

Additional personnel

- Gordon Raphael – production
- Greg Calbi – mastering
- Colin Lane – photography
- Jacques Carlu – back cover art on the American version (View of the Citadel on the Capitol, 1924)

== Charts ==
=== Weekly charts ===
Weekly chart performance for Is This It
Chart (2001–2002)	Peak position
Australian Albums (ARIA)	5
Austrian Albums (Ö3 Austria)	35
Belgian Albums (Ultratop Flanders)	47
Canadian Albums (Nielsen Soundscan)	50
Dutch Albums (Album Top 100)	54
Finnish Albums (Suomen virallinen lista)	23
French Albums (SNEP)	19
German Albums (Offizielle Top 100)	28
Irish Albums (IRMA)	4
New Zealand Albums (RMNZ)	23
Norwegian Albums (VG-lista)	2
Swedish Albums (Sverigetopplistan)	3
UK Albums (OCC)	2
US Billboard 200	33

Chart (2026)	Peak position
Irish Independent Albums (IRMA)	34

=== Year-end charts ===
2001 year-end chart performance for Is This It
Chart (2001)	Position
Australian Albums (ARIA)	80
Swedish Albums (Sverigetopplsitan)	63
Swedish Albums & Compilations (Sverigetopplistan)	84
UK Albums (OCC)	71

2002 year-end chart performance for Is This It
Chart (2002)	Position
Australian Albums (ARIA)	88
Canadian Albums (Nielsen SoundScan)	122
Canadian Alternative Albums (Nielsen SoundScan)	37
UK Albums (OCC)	82
US Billboard 200	105

== Certifications ==
Certifications for Is This It
Region	Certification	Certified units/sales
Australia (ARIA)	2× Platinum	140,000^{‡}
Canada (Music Canada)	Platinum	100,000^{^}
Denmark (IFPI Danmark)	Platinum	20,000^{‡}
Italy (FIMI) sales since 2009	Gold	25,000^{‡}
Japan (RIAJ)	Gold	100,000^{^}
New Zealand (RMNZ)	Platinum	15,000^{^}
Sweden (GLF)	Platinum	80,000^{^}
United Kingdom (BPI)	3× Platinum	900,000^{^}
United States (RIAA)	Platinum	1,000,000^{^}
^{^} Shipments figures based on certification alone.^{‡} Sales+streaming figures based on certification alone.

== Release history ==
Release history for Is This It
Country	Date	Format	Label
Australia	July 30, 2001	CD	RCA
Japan	August 22, 2001	CD	RCA
United Kingdom	August 27, 2001	CD, vinyl	Rough Trade
United States	September 11, 2001	Vinyl	RCA
United States	October 9, 2001	CD	RCA

== See also ==
- Album era
