= New York City Cops (song) =

2001 song by The Strokes

Single by the Strokes

from the album Is This It (international editions)
- A-side: "Hard to Explain" (double A-side)
- Released: June 25, 2001 (double A-side)
- Recorded: March and April 2001
- Studio: Transporterraum, New York City
- Genre: Street punk
- Length: 3:30
- Label: RCA
- Songwriter: Julian Casablancas
- Producer: Gordon Raphael

The Strokes singles chronology
"Hard to Explain" / "New York City Cops" (2001)	"Last Nite" (2001)

"New York City Cops" is a song by American rock band the Strokes. It was released along with "Hard to Explain" as a double A-side single on June 25, 2001, in Australia and Europe. It appears on international editions of their debut studio album, Is This It (2001); it was replaced with the track "When It Started" on the then-unreleased American CD edition following the September 11 attacks due to its lyrics regarding the New York City Police Department. As a double A-side single, it reached number 16 in the UK and number 66 in Australia.

== Background and release ==
"New York City Cops", written in response to the 1999 killing of Amadou Diallo by four plainclothes police officers, was released along with "Hard to Explain" as a double A-side single on June 25, 2001, through RCA Records in Australia and Europe. Both tracks would later be included on their debut studio album, Is This It (2001). The song features the refrain "New York City cops, they ain’t too smart." Since the American CD had not been released yet, the song was removed after the September 11 attacks. The band did so after they witnessed the "valiant response" of the city's police department during the tragedy, feeling that it would be "wrong to release it during these highly sensitive times". They replaced the song with the newly recorded "When It Started". The vinyl release retained the original track list, due to its release falling on September 11, 2001.

== Live performances ==
The Strokes continued to perform the song live despite the September 11 attacks. During their performance in Toronto on October 2, 2001, Casablancas stated, "I liked this fucking song and it's ruined. We live in New York. It's fucked up. The cops have killed a lot more people than they're saying and that's the fuckin' truth."

The song was performed at a rally for Senator Bernie Sanders at the Whittemore Center Arena in Durham, New Hampshire on February 10, 2020. According to some accounts, "New York City Cops" was not on the band's setlist, but the Strokes performed the song after taking issue with lights being turned up and attempts to stop crowd-surfing fans.

== Track listing ==
All tracks are written by Julian Casablancas.

7-inch vinyl
No.	Title	Length
1.	"Hard to Explain"	3:43
2.	"New York City Cops"	3:30

CD
No.	Title	Length
1.	"Hard to Explain"	3:43
2.	"New York City Cops"	3:30
3.	"Take It or Leave It" (in LA)	3:15
4.	"Trying Your Luck" (in LA)	3:25

== Personnel ==
The Strokes

- Julian Casablancas – vocals
- Nick Valensi – guitar
- Albert Hammond Jr. – guitar
- Nikolai Fraiture – bass guitar
- Fab Moretti – drums

Additional personnel

- Gordon Raphael – production
- Greg Calbi – mastering

== Charts ==
=== Weekly charts ===
Weekly chart performance for "Hard to Explain" / "New York City Cops" by The Strokes
Chart (2001–2002)	Peak position
Australia (ARIA)	66
UK Singles (OCC)	16

=== Year-end charts ===
Year-end chart performance for "Hard to Explain" / "New York City Cops" by The Strokes
Chart (2002)	Position
Canada (Nielsen SoundScan)	96
