= Ydegirl =

Danish singer, songwriter, and producer

Andrea Novel known professionally as Ydegirl is a Danish singer, songwriter, and producer.

In 2021, she released her debut album Ydegirl. In 2023, she covered "Song To The Siren" by This Mortal Coil for FADER & Friends Vol. 1, a 44 song compilation which benefited transgender organizations.
