= Mekdes =

Mekdes (also spelled Mekedes, Mekides, or Merkedes) is a feminine given name of Ethiopian origin. Notable people with the name include:

- Mekides Abebe (born 2001), Ethiopian steeplechase runner
- Mekedes Alemeshete, Ethiopian long-distance runner
- Mekdes Bekele, Ethiopian steeplechase runner
- Mekdes Daba Feyssa, Ethiopian politician
- Mekdes (singer) (born 1998), Danish-Ethiopian singer and songwriter
