= Olivia Anna Livki =

- Born: Olivia Anna Schnitzler; 2 April 1984 (age 42); Opole, Poland
- Genres: Indie pop, indie electronic
- Instruments: Vocals, bass, keyboard
- Years active: 2007–present
- Labels: Self-release (L I V V Music), EMI/Warner
- Website: oliviaannalivki.com

Olivia Anna Livki (born Olivia Anna Schnitzler; 2 April 1984), also known as LiVKi, is a German singer-songwriter, multi-instrumentalist, arranger and filmmaker currently living in Berlin.

== Life and education ==
Olivia Anna Schnitzler was born on 2 April 1984 in Opole, Poland and raised in Black Forest, South Germany. Olivia graduated from Gymnasium am Hoptbühl, VS in 2004. She went on to study Film Studies, English Philology and Comparative Literature at Freie Universität Berlin, which she finished with Bachelor of Arts in 2008. On April 7, 2018, she announced on Facebook, that she also earned her Master´s Degree in Film Studies. One year later, she also announced that she finished an education as a film and video editor in Berlin.

== Musical career ==
In 2009, Olivia began her career as a professional musician. She released her demo The Smiling Face of Progress and made two internet-videos: Tennis Rackets (from Girl vs. City) and Hologram (stop motion-animation-video). In order to fund the financing of her debut-album, she took part in a music talent-show on Polish television in 2011. Her appearance caused a hype on the internet and throughout the media, with journalists and audiences often referring to her as a musical "epiphany". A 2014-video-re-upload of her TV-performance of Tel Aviv (originally from 2011) generated more than 130.000 clicks. Demo-versions of songs were shared by fans on Myspace and YouTube.

In November 2011, the 9 track-concept-album The Name Of This Girl Is was released. It was written, arranged and produced by Livki and mixed by Patrick Dillett and Ron Allaire. The album was self-released (under the name L I V V). It was critically well received. Journalist Karolina Korwin-Piotrowska wrote about the artist and The Name of This Girl Is in her book Bomba. Alfabet polskiego szolbiznesu (The facto 2013). On the day of the album's release, Livki opened for Lenny Kravitz in Torwar, Warsaw.

Livki gave a number of live performances, which included festivals in Berlin, Tokyo, Prague as well as OFF Festival 2011/2015, Reeperbahn Festival 2014 and Coke Live Music Festival 2011.

In July 2012, she signed a license-contract with EMI Music in Poland (currently Warner Music). In September 2012, The Name Of This Girl Is was re-released as Extended Edition with 3 bonus tracks, and appeared in physical stores, accompanied by a promotional campaign. Its singles were Abby Abby (Choir Girl Remix) and Blood Ponies. Livki ´s song Tennis Rackets was also featured on the original soundtrack album and score of feature film Big Love (2012).

In 2014, Livki collaborated with Producer Sterling Fox on her single Dark Blonde Rises, which was released on Fox´s US-indie label Silver Scream Records

In 2015, Livki released her second album Strangelivv followed by an EP called I Am Carthago Pt.1. Its single Noke was featured on Berlin Music Commissions´s Listen to Berlin-Compilation 2016/17.

In 2019, the Listen to Berlin 2019/20 compilation included her single Spectacular. Her third album Digital Dissidents was released in 2020.

== Discography ==
=== Albums ===
- The Name Of This Girl Is (L I V V, 2011)
- The Name Of This Girl Is - Extended (EMI, 2012)
- Strangelivv (LIVV, Warner Music 2015)
- EP: I Am Carthago Pt. 1 (LIVV, 2016)
- Digital Dissidents (LIVV, 2020)

=== Singles ===
- Tel Aviv (L I V V, 2011)
- Tennis Rackets / Song For The TV (L I V V, 2011)
- Abby Abby! (Choir Girl Remix) (EMI, 2012)
- Earth Moves (EMI, 2013)
- Blood Ponies (Parlophone / L I V V, 2013)
- Dark Blonde Rises (Silver Scream Records, 2014)
- Geek Power (Warner Music, 2015)
- Subways (Warner Music, 2015)
- Noke (LIVV, 2016)
- Spectacular (LIVV, 2020)

=== Music videos ===
- Hologram (2009)
- Tennis Rackets (2009)
- Abby Abby! (Choir Girl Remix) (2012)
- Earth Moves (2013)
- Blood Ponies (2013)
- Geek Power (2015)
- Noke (2016)
- Spectacular (2020)

=== Compilations ===
- Big Love OST (EMI, 2012).
- Listen to Berlin 2016/17 (BMC 2016)
- Listen to Berlin 2019/20 (BMC 2019)

=== Literature ===
Korwin-Piotrowska, Karolina, Bomba: Alfabet polskiego sholbiznesu, The Facto, Warsaw 2013)
