= Reptilia (song) =

2004 single by the Strokes

Single by The Strokes

from the album Room on Fire
- B-side: "Modern Girls & Old Fashion Men"
- Released: February 9, 2004
- Recorded: 2003
- Genre: Indie rock; garage punk; post-punk revival
- Length: 3:39
- Label: Rough Trade; RCA
- Songwriter: Julian Casablancas
- Producer: Gordon Raphael

The Strokes singles chronology
"12:51" (2003)	"Reptilia" (2004)	"The End Has No End" (2004)

Music video
- "Reptilia" on YouTube

"Reptilia" is a song by American rock band the Strokes. It was released as the second single from their second studio album, Room on Fire (2003) on February 9, 2004. The song was written by Julian Casablancas and produced by Gordon Raphael. In the US, it peaked at number 19 on the Modern Rock Tracks chart. It fared better in the UK, where it reached number 17 on the UK Singles Chart and was certified gold by the British Phonographic Industry (BPI). The single cover depicts an alien from the video game Centipede.

The single's B-side was "Modern Girls & Old Fashion Men", a duet between the band's lead singer Casablancas and Regina Spektor. The release of the single was delayed slightly after Casablancas objected to the song being credited as "the Strokes and Regina Spektor", claiming that it should read "Regina Spektor and The Strokes".

In October 2011, NME placed "Reptilia" at number 129 on its list "150 Best Tracks of the Past 15 Years". In 2020, The Independent and Paste ranked the song number seven and number six, respectively, on their lists of the 20 greatest Strokes songs.

The song has appeared in the video games Guitar Hero III: Legends of Rock, Guitar Hero Live, and Rock Band.

== Music video ==
The music video for the song was their first that was not directed by Roman Coppola. Instead they chose Jake Scott to shoot the video, which features close shots of the band members' faces, hands, and instruments while performing the song.

== Track listing ==
No.	Title	Length
1.	"Reptilia"	3:41
2.	"Modern Girls & Old Fashion Men" (Regina Spektor and The Strokes)	3:40

== Personnel ==
- Julian Casablancas – vocals
- Albert Hammond, Jr. – guitar
- Nick Valensi – guitar
- Nikolai Fraiture – bass
- Fabrizio Moretti – drums

== Charts ==
=== Weekly charts ===
Weekly chart performance for "Reptilia"
Chart (2004)	Peak position
Australia (ARIA)	68
Canada (Nielsen SoundScan)	19
Scottish Singles Sales (Official Charts)	17
UK Singles (Official Charts)	17
UK Indie (Official Charts)	2
US Alternative Airplay (Billboard)	19

=== Year-end charts ===
Year-end chart performance for "Reptilia"
Chart (2004)	Position
US Modern Rock Tracks (Billboard)	78

== Certifications ==
Certifications for "Reptilia"
Region	Certification	Certified units/sales
Australia (ARIA)	Gold	35,000^{‡}
Italy (FIMI)	Gold	50,000^{‡}
New Zealand (RMNZ)	Platinum	30,000^{‡}
Portugal (AFP)	Gold	20,000^{‡}
Spain (Promusicae)	Platinum	60,000^{‡}
United Kingdom (BPI)	Platinum	600,000^{‡}
United States (RIAA)	Platinum	1,000,000^{‡}
^{‡} Sales+streaming figures based on certification alone.
