= Gordon Raphael =

American record producer

- Origin: Seattle, Washington, U.S.
- Occupations: Record producer; songwriter; musician
- Instruments: Keyboards, guitar, bass, vocals
- Website: gordotronic.com

Gordon Raphael is an American record producer and musician from Seattle, Washington and New York, currently living in Hebden Bridge (UK), after spending 15 years in Berlin. Gordon runs a website called Gordotronic which features his own original music, artwork and writings. In the year 2022 he published his first book, "The World Is Going To Love This (Up From The Basement With The Strokes)" though Wordville Press in London.

Raphael is most widely known for his work with The Strokes, whom he met while attending an early show at Luna Lounge on Ludlow Street, New York City. He produced their debut EP The Modern Age as well as their first two albums Is This It and Room on Fire. The EP and first album were recorded entirely in his basement studio Transporterraum NYC (co-owned by Jimmy Goodman). He has also produced songs for The Cribs, Sarah Maguire, Skin, Mexican rock band Fobia, Satellites (from Mallorca), and Soviet Kitsch by Regina Spektor.

Other notables he has worked with include the Cult's Ian Astbury and Ian Brown of The Stone Roses. Other rock music he has produced: from Bognor Regis Kill Kenada, Britain's The Moonies, the London band Three Trapped Tigers, operatic art rockers Ox.Eagle.Lion.Man, Swiss literary-rock band The Mondrians, Finland's Caroline Taucher and The Whas, UK artists Charly Flynn and The Sound Explosion, Peruvian band Los Outsaiders. He worked as engineer, and played keyboards, on all of New York singer-songwriter Roxanne Fontana's second album, Souvenirs d'Amour. As of early 2025 he is mixing an album for Pinc Louds.

== Career ==
=== Early career ===
As a musician, Raphael formed two bands in Seattle: Mental Mannequin and Colour Twigs. He was also the keyboardist for the Seattle-based psychedelic band Sky Cries Mary and part of a dark-wave band called Absinthee with Anne Hadlock. Raphael has said his favorite instrument is the ARP Odyssey (a small 1970s analog synthesizer), which he started learning at age 18.

=== 2000s: The Strokes and work in Europe ===
Raphael moved to London in 2002 following the success of Is This It, and founded a studio there called The Silver Transporterraum of London. In his first year living there, he worked with thirty bands, and was asked to produce the debut album of The Libertines whilst mixing live sound on their first-ever UK Tour (with The Vines and The Strokes). Rapahel also began curating a club night called The Basement Club with Transgressive Records co-founder Toby L, presented very early concerts by Regina Spektor, Bloc Party, The Libertines, and Raphael's own band Black Light among many others.

In 2005, after working for almost a year on The Strokes album First Impressions of Earth, Raphael was replaced as producer by David Kahne.

He moved to Berlin to be close to his friend, producer Moses Schneider. From his Berlin base, many European bands began to contact him via the internet to work, including Zeno and the Stoics (Madrid), Mikkel Glasser (Copenhagen), Satellites (Mallorca), Big Deal (London), A Brand (Brussels), Deportivo (Paris), Scanners (London), Olivia Anna Livki (Berlin), Super 700 (Berlin), Ian Astbury (London), Eva Loft (Berlin), and The Michelles (Berlin).

=== 2010s: Further international work and original music ===
In January 2010, Raphael went to Cape Town, South Africa, to produce the debut album Shark by indie rock band The Plastics.

In 2011–2012, Raphael worked in San Antonio, Texas with Education, The Dirty Clergy, Ill Prospekt and Victoria Celestine. He then met Ricky Berger and co-engineered her new collection of songs. Around the time of Hurricane Sandy, he was back for a rare visit to Manhattan producing an album for Lewis Lazar, then luckily being called to his beloved Seattle for an album with Ben Ireland (a drummer that Raphael worked closely with in his own bands including Mental Mannequin, The Tears of Gloom, and Sky Cries Mary). Whilst in the Pacific Northwest, Raphael was introduced to The Tempers, a "wild-electronic band of brother and twin sisters" and was thrilled to record 6 interstellar electronic rock songs with them.

In May 2013, he went to Lima, Peru, to record a Peruvian new band called Los Outsaiders. In October 2013, he went to Seattle, Washington, and recorded a seven-song EP with Red Martian. In April 2014, Raphael went to Mexico City and recorded a six-song EP with the up-and-coming band Sol Flamingo while simultaneously filming a small documentary on "the making" of it with Montreal based filmmaker Patrick Barbeau.

Raphael gave a production master-class at British & Irish Modern Music Institute in Berlin (BIMM) in March 2016.

A fortunate development occurred when rising Argentinian musician Rocco Posca asked Raphael to produce his new album, Fervor for Sony Music. In June 2018, these recording sessions began, and on the first day guitarist Maria Florencia Silva, offered to start a new band with Raphael, called The Wild Cards which toured briefly through South America.

On January 1, 2019, Raphael released his album I Lick The Moog, which had been recorded in his old NYC Studio Transporterraum during Christmas 2000, four months before the recording of The Strokes Is This It began. At that time Raphael, was actually living in the studio, in a basement under Avenue A. The album contains outsider-rock songs, mixed with experimental soundscapes and electronic atmospheres created on his beloved Arp Odyssey, a Jupiter 6 and Mini Moog.

As of June 1, 2025 Gordon Raphael has 15 albums of his own music on all streaming platforms, as well as 4 EPs and 12 singles.

== Production discography ==
Year	Title	Artist	Credits
1986	Skin Yard	Skin Yard	Assistant engineer, recording
1986	Dry As a Bone	Green River	Engineer
1998	Fresh Fruits for the Liberation	Sky Cries Mary	Engineer, mixing
1999	Seemed Like a Good Idea at the Time	Scout	Engineer, mixing
2000	Colour Twigs	Colour Twigs	Producer
2000	Mélodie Citronique	Blonde Redhead	Engineer
2001	The Modern Age	The Strokes	Producer
2001	Is This It	The Strokes	Producer
2001	Souvenirs d'Amour	Roxanne Fontana	Engineer
2001	The Bellwether Project	Slang	Engineer
2002	Riff After Riff	The Wildhearts	Producer
2003	Soviet Kitsch	Regina Spektor	Producer
2003	Room on Fire	The Strokes	Producer
2005	Rosa Venus	Fobia	Producer
2006	First Impressions of Earth	The Strokes	Co-producer
2006	Fake Chemical State	Skin	Producer
2008	Reality Check	The Teenagers	Vocal engineer
2008	Close to the Sun	Jody Porter	Producer
2008	The Right Way to Do Wrong	Myriad Creatures	Producer, engineer, mixing
2010	Close the Evil Eye	The Tellers	Producer, engineer, mixing
2018	I Don't Run	Hinds	Producer
2021	Cool	Colleen Green	Producer, engineer
2026	Green Light	The Orange Blossoms	Producer, mixing
2026	Selling a Vibe	The Cribs	Producer
