= List of number-one hits (Denmark) =

This is a list of number one singles charts from Denmark Singles and Albums Charts.

They are taken from Nielsen & IFPI (pre-2001), Hitlisten and Tracklisten (2001–present) and the albums charts from Tracklisten starting 2007 in Denmark.

== Nielsen Music Control and IFPI ==
This chart was compiled by Nielsen Music Control in association with the Danish branch of the International Federation of the Phonographic Industry (IFPI).

== Hitlisten ==
The Hitlisten Singles Top-20 chart was the official Danish singles chart. It was launched on 5 January 2001 and lasted until end of 30 October 2007 Hitlisten was discontinued as an official chart to be replaced by Tracklisten Top 40 charts on 2 November 2007.

== Tracklisten ==
”Tracklisten” official chart for singles started on Week 43 / 2007 dated November 2, 2007 when it replaced the "Hitlisten" Single Top-20 and Download Top 20. The chart is published at hitlsten.nu. However, the "Tracklisten" was updated back to week 1, 2007 according to statistics kept, so for this period of 10 months (January to October 2007), we have two #1 singles listings: The Official "Hitlisten" charts" and the estimated Tracklisten with different #1 listed.

== Weekly singles charts ==
- 1969
- 1970 · 1971 · 1972 · 1973 · 1974
- 1988 · 1989
- 1990 · 1991 · 1992 · 1993 · 1994 · 1995 · 1996 · 1997 · 1998 · 1999
- 2000 · 2001 · 2002 · 2003 · 2004 · 2005 · 2006 · 2007 · 2008 · 2009
- 2010 · 2011 · 2012 · 2013 · 2014 · 2015 · 2016 · 2017 · 2018 · 2019
- 2020 · 2021 · 2022 · 2023 · 2024 · 2025 · 2026

== Weekly albums charts ==
- 2000s · 2010s · 2020s
