= Artigeardit discography =

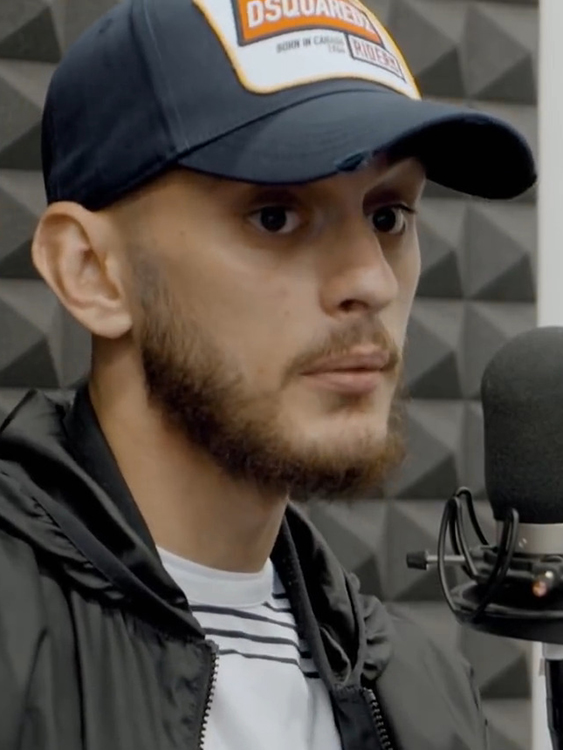
- Artigeardit in 2020
- Studio albums: 6
- EPs: 6
- Singles: 34
- Music videos: 12
- Guest appearances: 5
- Collaborative albums: 1
- Collaborative EPs: 1

Albanian-Danish rapper Artigeardit has released six solo studio albums, six solo extended plays (EPs), 34 singles, and 12 music videos. He has also released a collaborative studio album and EP, both with fellow Danish rapper Lamin. Under the Universal Music Denmark label, Artigeardit released his debut EP, Fristelse fordærver, in March 2016. Following this release, he began to self-publish his work under the Artige Records label. Under his own label, he released his debut studio album Vildedage in May 2018, which charted as high as number 14 on the Hitlisten charts in 2022. He self-published two more EPs in 2019, releasing 2.0 EP in January and 3p in June. In between albums, he released the song "Gothersgade" which became his first single to reach the Danish top 40, peaking at number 22 in 2019. His next studio album, Idiot, was released in January 2020. The album reached as high as number two in Denmark, while the title track song featuring Karl William became his second single to reach the charts. His fourth EP, Elev4tormusik, released in September 2020 and reached number three on the Hitlisten charts, his highest-charting release to that point.

Artigeradit's third studio album, Held & lykke med at komme hjem, released in May 2021 under Def Jam Recordings Denmark. It became his first number one album on the Danish charts with the song "Er her", featuring Kesi, becoming his first number one single. The album has gone on to become triple-Platinum certified by IFPI Denmark, while the single with Kesi has gone on to achieve Platinum five times. In October 2021, Ny agenda released to a number three peak in the charts. The album was Artigeardit's first collaborative EP with Lamin. After two years, his next album released on 27 January 2023. Længe leve became his second studio album to achieve number one on the charts. The album, which contained 10 songs, sent every song to the Danish top 40 singles. Nu hvor vi er her, Artigeardit's first collaborative studio album with Lamin, released on 1 September 2023. The album became a third consecutive number one album for Artigeardit, while also going triple Platinum. Like Længe leve, the collaborative album sent 10 songs into the Danish top 40.

På gen5yn, Artigeardit's fifth EP, released on 28 June 2024. The album peaked at number five, with only one song reaching the Hitlisten charts. The following spring, he released Æteren. The album became another number one album following its release in April 2025. "Seaside" preceded the album's release, and went to number two on the charts while achieving Platinum certification. His first release of 2026 came when he released the EP Pusto on February. By spring, he released two more singles, "Louisiana" and "Ivrig". Both songs appeared at number five on the Hitlisten charts in different weeks, and were part of his sixth solo album, Den lange vej. Like his previous four solo albums, Den lange vej reached number one on its release.

== Studio albums ==
=== Solo studio albums ===
Title	Details	Peak chart positions	Certifications
Title	Details	DEN	Certifications
Vildedage	Released: 30 May 2018; Label: Artige Records	14	IFPI DEN: 3× Platinum
Idiot	Released: 31 January 2020; Label: Artige Records	2	IFPI DEN: Platinum
Held & lykke med at komme hjem	Released: 28 May 2021; Labels: Def Jam Recordings Denmark Universal Music Denmark	1	IFPI DEN: 3× Platinum
Længe leve	Released: 27 January 2023; Labels: Def Jam Recordings Denmark Universal Music Denmark	1	IFPI DEN: 2× Platinum
Æteren	Released: 25 April 2025; Label: Universal Music Denmark	1	IFPI DEN: Gold
Den lange vej	Released: 5 June 2026; Label: Universal Music Denmark	1	IFPI DEN: Gold

=== Collaborative studio albums ===
Title	Details	Peak chart positions	Certifications
Title	Details	DEN	Certifications
Nu hvor vi er her (with Lamin)	Released: 1 September 2023; Label: Universal Music Denmark	1	IFPI DEN: 3× Platinum

== Extended plays ==
=== Solo extended plays ===
Title	Details	Peak chart positions	Certifications
Title	Details	DEN	Certifications
Fristelse fordærver	Released: 4 March 2016; Label: Universal Music Denmark	—	
2.0 EP	Released: 16 January 2019; Label: Artige Records	—	IFPI DEN: Gold
3p	Released: 14 June 2019; Label: Artige Records	—	
Elev4tormusik	Released: 11 September 2020; Labels: Def Jam Recordings Denmark Universal Music Denmark	3	IFPI DEN: Gold
På gen5yn	Released: 28 June 2024; Labels: Force Majeure Records Universal Music Denmark	5	
Pusto	Released: 13 February 2026; Label: Universal Music Denmark	2	
"—" denotes a recording that did not chart or was not released in that territory.

=== Collaborative extended plays ===
Title	Details	Peak chart positions	Certifications
Title	Details	DEN	Certifications
Ny agenda (with Lamin)	Released: 15 October 2021; Labels: Def Jam Recordings Denmark Universal Music Denmark	3	IFPI DEN: 2× Platinum

== Singles ==
=== As lead artist ===
List of singles as lead artist, with selected chart positions, showing year released and album name
Title	Year	Peak chart positions	Certifications	Album
Title	Year	DEN	Certifications	Album
"Nummer"	2016	—		Non-album singles
"Ik for børn" (featuring Icekiid)	2017	—		Non-album singles
"Værformig"	2017	—	IFPI DEN: 2× Platinum	Non-album singles
"Laos" (featuring Christos)	2017	—		Non-album singles
"Vildedage"	2018	—	IFPI DEN: Gold	Non-album singles
"Tempo"	2018	—		2.0 EP
"Ses senere"	2018	—	IFPI DEN: Platinum	2.0 EP
"Joggingsæt"	2019	—	IFPI DEN: Platinum	3p
"Airbag"	2019	—	IFPI DEN: Gold	3p
"Lov mig 1 ting"	2019	—	IFPI DEN: Platinum	Non-album singles
"Gothersgade"	2019	22	IFPI DEN: Platinum	Non-album singles
"Milano Step" (Artigeardit with Lamin)	2020	—	IFPI DEN: Gold	Non-album singles
"Idiot" (Artigeardit featuring Karl William)	2020	38	IFPI DEN: Gold	Idiot
"Typisk mig" (Jimilian, Artigeardit, Gio)	2020	—		Non-album singles
"Stensikker"	2020	—		Non-album singles
"Byen (FCK)"	2020	—		Non-album singles
"Den værste"	2020	19	IFPI DEN: Gold	Non-album singles
"I nat" (Artigeardit with Medina)	2020	22	IFPI DEN: Gold	Non-album singles
"Stå op gå ned" (with Barselona)	2021	—	IFPI DEN: Platinum	Held & lykke med at komme hjem
"B2B" (with Carmon)	2021	—	IFPI DEN: Gold	Non-album single
"Er her" (with Kesi)	2021	1	IFPI DEN: 5× Platinum	Held & lykke med at komme hjem
"Hensigt"	2022	9		Non-album singles
"Vågen" (with Lamin)	2022	10	IFPI DEN: 3× Platinum	Non-album singles
"Spåkone"	2023	7	IFPI DEN: Gold	Non-album singles
"Stadig? Selvfølgelig!"	2023	37		Non-album singles
"Vi ku' blive" (with Lamin)	2023	25	IFPI DEN: 2× Platinum	Nu hvor vi er her
"Sent" (with Lamin)	2024	1	IFPI DEN: Platinum	Non-album single
"Seaside"	2025	2	IFPI DEN: Platinum	Æteren
"Hvad forventer de freestyle" (Anton Westerlin with Artigeardit)	2025	—		Bag gardinerne S1+S2
"Sandheden" (Rasmus Seebach with Artigeardit)	2025	1	IFPI DEN: Platinum	Non-album singles
"Tænker kun på dig"	2025	—		Non-album singles
"Louisiana"	2026	5	IFPI DEN: Gold	Den lange vej
"Ivrig"	2026	5	IFPI DEN: Gold	Den lange vej
"Te ske" (featuring AEL)	2026	19		Non-album single
"—" denotes a recording that did not chart or was not released in that territory.

=== As featured artist ===
List of featured singles, showing year released and album name
Title	Year	Peak chart positions	Certifications	Album
Title	Year	DEN	Certifications	Album
"Level op" (Josva featuring Artigeardit)	2019	—		Non-album singles
"Jumeirah" (Icekiid featuring Artigeardit)	2023	—		Non-album singles
"Lonely" (Josva featuring Artigeardit)	2025	2	IFPI DEN: Platinum	Non-album singles
"Frankrig" (Josva featuring Artigeardit)	2026	29		Non-album singles
"Bliv hvor du er" (Rosa featuring Artigeardit)	2026	2	IFPI DEN: Gold	Lige her, lige nu
"—" denotes a recording that did not chart or was not released in that territory.

== Other charted songs ==
List of songs, with selected chart positions, showing year released and album name
Title	Year	Peak chart positions	Certifications	Album
Title	Year	DEN	Certifications	Album
"Baby"	2020	24	IFPI DEN: Gold	Elev4tormusik
"Elvis" (featuring Carmon)	2020	35		Elev4tormusik
"Som du vil"	2021	27		Held & lykke med at komme hjem
"Advokat"	2021	15	IFPI DEN: Gold	Held & lykke med at komme hjem
"Hvor fuck er min drink?" (with Lamin)	2021	14	IFPI DEN: 2× Platinum	Ny agenda
"Mumler for meget" (with Lamin)	2021	33	IFPI DEN: Gold	Ny agenda
"Humør" (with Lamin)	2021	35		Ny agenda
"Længe leve"	2023	2	IFPI DEN: Platinum	Længe leve
"Ensom"	2023	3	IFPI DEN: Gold	Længe leve
"Tetovo"	2023	4	IFPI DEN: Gold	Længe leve
"Snubler"	2023	6	IFPI DEN: Platinum	Længe leve
"Chart"	2023	13		Længe leve
"Til mig selv"	2023	19		Længe leve
"Sidste gang"	2023	20		Længe leve
"Solskin"	2023	27		Længe leve
"Alting, altid"	2023	28		Længe leve
"Sig hvad du vil"	2023	34		Længe leve
"Ssshhhhh (Shut Up)" (with Lamin and Jelassi)	2023	33		Nu hvor vi er her
"XOXO" (with Lamin and Icekiid)	2023	6	IFPI DEN: Platinum	Nu hvor vi er her
"Sirjegsindssyg" (with Lamin and Benjamin Hav)	2023	26		Nu hvor vi er her
"Ret god stemning" (with Lamin)	2023	20		Nu hvor vi er her
"Selvfølgelig" (with Lamin)	2023	11	IFPI DEN: Gold	Nu hvor vi er her
"Sorte pletter" (with Lamin)	2023	17		Nu hvor vi er her
"Dag-til-dag Rapper" (with Lamin)	2023	23		Nu hvor vi er her
"Hva Status" (with Lamin)	2023	4	IFPI DEN: Gold	Nu hvor vi er her
"Carplay" (with Lamin)	2023	40		Nu hvor vi er her
"God mand/Dårlig verden" (with Lamin)	2023	32		Nu hvor vi er her
"Holddamagle"	2024	31		På gen5yn
"Honningkrukken"	2025	40		Æteren
"Regning"	2026	22		Pusto
"Hvis væggene kunne tale" (featuring Ozzy)	2026	9		Den lange vej
"Foden på pedalen	2026	26		Den lange vej
"En ulykke kommer sjældent alene" (featuring Soleima)	2026	35		Den lange vej

== Music videos ==
List of music videos, with directors, showing year released
Title	Year	Director(s)
"Vildedage"	2018	Simone Schiellerup Stefansen
"Ses senere"	2018	Kristoffer Kirketerp Frandsen
"Lov mig 1 ting"	2019	Unknown
"Idiot" (featuring Karl William)	2020	Christian Kirkeby
"Bagsæde"	2020	Vida
"Stensikker"	2020	Vida
"B2B" (with Carmon)	2021	Unknown
"Er her" (with Kesi)	2021	Jens Ulrik Helmbæk
"Hvor fuck er min drink?" (with Lamin)	2021	Unknown
"Humør" (with Lamin)	2021	Unknown
"Længe leve" (with Lamin)	2023	Artigeardit, Oli Zaza, & Kasper Weng
"Seaside"	2025	Oli Zaza & Kasper Weng
