= Idiot (album) =

2020 studio album by Artigeardit

Studio album by Artigeardit
- Released: 31 January 2020
- Genre: Hip-hop
- Length: 45:04
- Label: Artige Records
- Producers: Adam Hillebrandt; Anton Westerlin; Rob Smyles; JenneJenne; Awinbeh Ayagiba; Levon Sahakian; SSAM

Artigeardit chronology
3p (2019)	Idiot (2020)	Elev4tormusik (2020)

Singles from Idiot
- 1. "Idiot" Released: 24 January 2020

Idiot is the second solo studio album by Albanian-Danish rapper Artigeardit. The album was released on music streaming platforms by Artige Records on 31 January 2020.

== Release and reception ==
Idiot was announced on 20 January 2020, when Artigeardit announced a release day concert at Hotel Cecil in Copenhagen. Having previously released "Lov mig 1 ting" and "Gothersgade", the title track featuring Karl William was released on 24 January. Nikolaj Boesby Skou described the single as showcasing Artigeardit's strengths as a poet, while discussing the themes of failed relationships and emotional maturity. The album was previously highlighted as one of the most anticipated Danish albums of 2020 by Soundvenue.

Upon release, the album received a positive review from Soundvenue, which gave it five of six stars. In his review, Niklas Krarup Larsen praised Artigeardit's introspective songwriting and the album's musical diversity. The album was later seen as an important step in Artigeardit's transition as an artist when compared to his following studio album, Held & lykke med at komme hjem.

Commercially, the album achieved platinum certification from IFPI Danmark in October 2021. The album's title track with Karl William also went on to peak at number 38 on the Hitlisten charts, while achieving gold certification. "Gothersgade" also went on to become the only other track to reach the Hitlisten charts when it peaked at number 22.

== Accolades ==
In the year following its release, Idiot received recognition from the Danish music industry. At the 2020 Danish Music Awards, Artigeardit was nominated for Songwriter of the Year for the album. That award ultimately went to the Minds of 99. The album was also nominated at the 2021 GAFFA Awards for Danish Hip-hop Release of the Year, though again did not win.

Year	Award	Category	Recipient(s)	Result	Ref.
2020	Danish Music Awards	Danish Songwriter of the Year	Artigeardit (for Idiot)	Nominated	
2021	GAFFA Awards	Danish Hip-hop Release of the Year	Idiot	Nominated	

== Track listing ==
No.	Title	Lyrics	Producer(s)	Length
1.	"Intro"	Artigeardit; Karl William	Adam Hillebrandt	1:48
2.	"Bagsæde"	Artigeardit	Hillebrandt; Anton Westerlin	2:46
3.	"Gothersgade"	Artigeardit	Rob Smyles; JenneJenne	2:11
4.	"Søvne"	Artigeardit	Hillebrandt; Awinbeh Ayagiba	3:15
5.	"Idiot" (featuring Karl William)	Artigeardit; William	Hillebrandt	3:53
6.	"Grøkjær"	Artigeardit	Smyles; JenneJenne	3:17
7.	"Bankråd"	Artigeardit	Westerlin	2:12
8.	"Etablering interlude"	Artigeardit	Hillebrandt	0:34
9.	"#%_! Dig selv"	Artigeardit	Hillebrandt	3:08
10.	"Lov mig 1 ting"	Artigeardit	Hillebrandt	3:46
11.	"Check" (featuring Christos)	Artigeardit; Christos	Hillebrandt	3:03
12.	"Beslutninger"	Artigeardit	Levon Sahakian; SSAM	2:17
13.	"Kom af sig selv"	Artigeardit	Westerlin	2:18
14.	"Følelsen"	Artigeardit	Sahakian	3:36
15.	"Aquafina" (featuring Lord Siva)	Artigeardit; Lord Siva	Sahakian; SSAM	3:14
16.	"La' den ringe"	Artigeardit	Westerlin	3:46
Total length:				45:04

== Charts ==
=== Weekly charts ===
Weekly chart performance
Chart (2020–2026)	Peak position
Danish Albums (Hitlisten)	2

=== Year-end charts ===
Year-end chart performance
Chart	Year	Position
Danish Albums (Hitlisten)	2020	35
Danish Albums (Hitlisten)	2021	61
Danish Albums (Hitlisten)	2022	56

== Certifications ==
Certifications
Region	Certification	Certified units/sales
Denmark (IFPI Danmark)	Platinum	20,000^{‡}
^{*} Sales figures based on certification alone.^{‡} Sales+streaming figures based on certification alone.
