= (Over)lever =

2026 studio album by Mille

Studio album by Mille
- Released: 23 January 2026
- Genre: Pop
- Length: 33:52
- Label: Warner Music Denmark
- Producers: T.O; Jeppe London; Oliver Cilwik; Samuel Ledet

Mille chronology
Vågner (2025)	(Over)lever (2026)

(Over)lever is the debut album by the Danish singer Mille. The album was released on 23 January 2026 by Warner Music Denmark. After release, it became a number one album in Denmark.

== Release and reception ==
Before (Over)lever, Mille had released two extended plays in 2024 and 2025 respectively. Vågner, her second EP, peaked at number six on the Hitlisten charts.

To begin 2026, Mille announced her debut album (Over)lever on 8 January, with the release date of 23 January. The following day, she released her second single of 2026, titled "Drømmefanger" which featured URO. This followed her release of "Bag blæk og papir" on 2 January, both songs having been revealed as part of her studio debut.

The critical reception to the album was mixed, with Soundvenue stating Mille failed to live up to the potential she previously showed while giving it three-of-six stars. Gaffa gave the album four-of-six stars. The album debuted at number one on the Hitlisten charts on 6 February. On 16 June, the album became certified Platinum.

== Track listing ==
No.	Title	Lyrics	Producer(s)	Length
1.	"Bag blæk og papir"	Mille	T.O	1:44
2.	"Tusind tanker"	Mille; Laurits Smedegaard Andersen; T.O	T.O	2:50
3.	"Alt vind og vejr" (featuring Ozzy)	Mille; Jeppe London; Oliver Cilwik; Oskar Elholm; Samuel Ledet	Jeppe London; Oliver Cilwik; Samuel Ledet	2:37
4.	"Aarhus"	Mille; Chris Burton; London; Cilwik; Ledet	London; Cilwik; Ledet	3:45
5.	"Blind af kærlighed"	Mille; Burton; Ledet	Ledet; London; Cilwik	2:32
6.	"Rollemodel" (bonus track)	Mille	London; Cilwik	2:09
7.	"Knust mit hjerte"	Mille; Burton; London; Cilwik; Ledet	London; Cilwik; Ledet	2:40
8.	"Ingen andre" (featuring Annika)	Annika; Frederik Scharff; London	London; Cilwik	2:48
9.	"Blomster i bedene (interlude)"	Mille; Burton; London	London	0:57
10.	"Drømmefanger" (featuring URO)	Mille; Burton; Jeppe Kronback; London; Cilwik; Ledet	London; Cilwik; Ledet	2:30
11.	"Hader ik mig selv sammen med dig"	Mille; London	London; Cilwik; Ledet	2:16
12.	"Skurk i forklædning"	Mille	T.O	2:07
13.	"180 i timen"	Mille; Burton; London	London; Cilwik; Ledet	2:46
14.	"Overlever"	Mille; London	London	2:11
Total length:				33:52

== Charts ==
Weekly chart performance
Chart (2026)	Peak position
Danish Albums (Hitlisten)	1

== Certifications ==
Certifications
Region	Certification	Certified units/sales
Denmark (IFPI Danmark)	Platinum	20,000^{‡}
^{*} Sales figures based on certification alone.^{‡} Sales+streaming figures based on certification alone.
