= Karl William (disambiguation) =

Karl William (born 1995) is a Danish musical artist.

Karl William may also refer to:

- Karl W. Hofmann (born 1961), president and CEO of Population Services International
- Karl William Kapp (1910–1976), German-American economist
- Karl William Pamp Jenkins (born 1944), Welsh musician

== See also ==
- Karl Wilhelm Reinmuth (1892–1979), also known as Karl William Reinmuth, German astronomer
- Karl Williams (born 1971), US American football player
