= List of number-one hits of 1993 (Denmark) =

This is a list of the Danish Singles Chart number-one hits of 1993 from the International Federation of the Phonographic Industry and Nielsen Marketing Research. They were provided through Music & Media magazine under the "Top 10 Sales In Europe" section.

== Chart history ==
Week	Single	Artist
1	"Happy Nation"	Ace Of Base
2	"I Will Always Love You"	Whitney Houston
3	"I Will Always Love You"	Whitney Houston
4	"I Will Always Love You"	Whitney Houston
5	"I Will Always Love You"	Whitney Houston
6	"I Will Always Love You"	Whitney Houston
7	"I Will Always Love You"	Whitney Houston
8	"Give It Up"	Cut'N'Move
9	"Give It Up"	Cut'N'Move
10	"Give It Up"	Cut'N'Move
11	"Give It Up"	Cut'N'Move
12	"Give It Up"	Cut'N'Move
13	"No Limit"	2 Unlimited
14	"No Limit"	2 Unlimited
15	"No Limit"	2 Unlimited
16	"No Limit"	2 Unlimited
17	"Informer"	Snow
18	"Informer"	Snow
19	"Informer"	Snow
20	"Informer"	Snow
21	"Informer"	Snow
22	"Informer"	Snow
23	"Informer"	Snow
24	"Informer"	Snow
25	"Informer"	Snow
26	"Informer"	Snow
27	"Informer"	Snow
28	"What Is Love"	Haddaway
29	"What Is Love"	Haddaway
30	"What Is Love"	Haddaway
31	"(I Can't Help) Falling In Love With You"	UB40
32	"Mr. Vain"	Culture Beat
33	"Mr. Vain"	Culture Beat
34	"Mr. Vain"	Culture Beat
35	"Mr. Vain"	Culture Beat
36	"Mr. Vain"	Culture Beat
37	"Mr. Vain"	Culture Beat
38	"Mr. Vain"	Culture Beat
39	"What's Up?"	4 Non Blondes
40	"What's Up?"	4 Non Blondes
41	"What's Up?"	4 Non Blondes
42	"What's Up?"	4 Non Blondes
43	"What's Up?"	4 Non Blondes
44	"Living On My Own"	Freddie Mercury
45	"I'd Do Anything For Love (But I Won't Do That)"	Meat Loaf
46	"I'd Do Anything For Love (But I Won't Do That)"	Meat Loaf
47	"The Sign"	Ace Of Base
48	"I'd Do Anything For Love (But I Won't Do That)"	Meat Loaf
49	"The Sign"	Ace Of Base
50	"The Sign"	Ace Of Base
51	"The Sign"	Ace Of Base
52	"The Sign"	Ace Of Base
