= Bag gardinerne S1+S2 =

2026 compilation album by Anton Westerlin

Compilation album by Anton Westerlin
- Released: 1 May 2026
- Genres: Electronica; hip-hop; house; pop
- Length: 32:16
- Label: Universal Music Denmark
- Producers: Anton Westerlin; Oliver Zoéga; Don Oskar; Upnorth; Adam Hillebrandt; Shai Lu; Marius Iversen

Anton Westerlin chronology
Godaften (2025)	Bag gardinerne S1+S2 (2026)

Bag gardinerne S1+S2 (transl. Behind the curtains S1+S2) is a compilation album from Danish record producer Anton Westerlin. Published by Universal Music Denmark, the album released on 1 May 2026.

== Release and reception ==
Bag gardinerne S1+S2 compiles the songs created during Anton Westerlin's Bag gardinerne, a YouTube series in which he invited various Danish artists into a studio to write and record new material. Across two seasons, the series featured 14 guests with a new episode released approximately once per month. On 28 April 2026, in the final episode of season two featuring Annika, Westerlin announced that all songs from the two seasons would be released on a compilation album. In an accompanying Instagram post, Westerlin stated it was an "insane journey" in making the program and it could only be concluded in releasing it as a collection.

On 1 May 2026, the album was released digitally by Universal Music Denmark. The album contains 15 tracks, with 14 songs from the YouTube series and "Ærlig freestyle" from the series finale. As an album, it first appeared on the Hitlisten charts on 13 May, becoming a number-one album in Denmark. The previously unreleased track with Annika also became a number-one hit. "Minder hos andre Freestyle", the track with Mille, had also peaked as a number-one hit prior to the album's release.

== Track listing ==
Disc 1
No.	Title	Lyrics	Producer(s)	Length
1.	"Blåtone Freestyle" (featuring Noah Carter)	Carter	Westerlin	1:06
2.	"Lidt alene Freestyle" (featuring August Høyen)	Høyen	Westerlin	1:13
3.	"Mundkurv Freestyle" (featuring Mas)	Mas; Sweepy	Westerlin	1:42
4.	"Chanel Freestyle" (featuring Lamin)	Lamin	Westerlin	2:06
5.	"Bellingham Freestyle" (featuring Kundo)	Nicolai Rakundo	Westerlin; Oliver Zoéga	1:24
6.	"Barn af byen Freestyle" (featuring Kesi)	Oliver Kesi Chambuso	Westerlin; Don Oskar	1:54
7.	"2 stepper Freestyle" (featuring Benny Jamz)	Benjamin Heyn-Johnsen	Westerlin	3:22
Total length:				12:47

Disc 2
No.	Title	Lyrics	Producer(s)	Length
1.	"Hvad forventer de Freestyle" (featuring Artigeardit)	Artigeardit	Westerlin; Zoéga	2:12
2.	"SpaceJam Freestyle" (featuring Icekiid)	Icekiid	Westerlin	3:00
3.	"Savage Freestyle" (featuring Tessa)	Tessa; Jesper Livid	Westerlin; Upnorth	2:22
4.	"Ai Freestyle" (featuring Ozzy)	Ozzy	Westerlin; Adam Hillebrandt	2:34
5.	"Minder hos andre Freestyle" (featuring Mille)	Mille	Westerlin	2:01
6.	"Bedre dage Freestyle" (featuring Sivas)	Sivas	Westerlin	2:17
7.	"Lagkagehuset Freestyle" (featuring Michael Williams)	Williams	Westerlin; Shai Lu	2:31
8.	"Ærlig Freestyle" (featuring Annika)	Annika	Westerlin; Marius Iversen	2:32
Total length:				19:29

== Charts ==
Weekly chart performance
Chart (2026)	Peak position
Danish Albums (Hitlisten)	1

== Certifications ==
Certifications
Region	Certification	Certified units/sales
Denmark (IFPI Danmark)	Platinum	20,000^{‡}
^{*} Sales figures based on certification alone.^{‡} Sales+streaming figures based on certification alone.
