= List of number-one hits of 2024 (Denmark) =

Tracklisten is a chart that ranks the best-performing singles and tracks in Denmark. Its data, published by IFPI Denmark and compiled by Nielsen Music Control, is based collectively on each single's weekly digital sales.

== Chart history ==
List of number-one hits
Week	Issue date	Song	Artist(s)	Ref.
1	10 January 2024	"555"	Gilli and Kesi	
2	17 January 2024	"555"	Gilli and Kesi	
3	24 January 2024	"555"	Gilli and Kesi	
4	31 January 2024	"Sent"	Artigeardit and Lamin	
5	7 February 2024	"555"	Gilli and Kesi	
6	14 February 2024	"555"	Gilli and Kesi	
7	21 February 2024	"Alt det"	Thor Farlov featuring Noah Carter	
8	28 February 2024	"Alt det"	Thor Farlov featuring Noah Carter	
9	6 March 2024	"Bellevue"	Tobias Rahim featuring D1MA	
10	13 March 2024	"Bellevue"	Tobias Rahim featuring D1MA	
11	20 March 2024	"Bellevue"	Tobias Rahim featuring D1MA	
12	27 March 2024	"Bellevue"	Tobias Rahim featuring D1MA	
13	3 April 2024	"Bellevue"	Tobias Rahim featuring D1MA	
14	10 April 2024	"Bellevue"	Tobias Rahim featuring D1MA	
15	17 April 2024	"Bellevue"	Tobias Rahim featuring D1MA	
16	24 April 2024	"Bellevue"	Tobias Rahim featuring D1MA	
17	1 May 2024	"Bellevue"	Tobias Rahim featuring D1MA	
18	8 May 2024	"Chanel Freestyle"	Lamin and Anton Westerlin	
19	15 May 2024	"Chanel Freestyle"	Lamin and Anton Westerlin	
20	22 May 2024	"Alt ved dig"	Gobs	
21	29 May 2024	"Alt ved dig"	Gobs	
22	5 June 2024	"Kongen af Danmark"	Malte Ebert and Herrelandsholdet	
23	12 June 2024	"Hva du på"	Lamin and Gilli	
24	19 June 2024	"Hva du på"	Lamin and Gilli	
25	26 June 2024	"Kongen af Danmark"	Malte Ebert and Herreslandsholdet	
26	3 July 2024	"Kongen af Danmark"	Malte Ebert and Herreslandsholdet	
27	10 July 2024	"Kongen af Danmark"	Malte Ebert and Herreslandsholdet	
28	17 July 2024	"Dark Room"	Tobias Rahim featuring Icekiid	
29	24 July 2024	"Dark Room"	Tobias Rahim featuring Icekiid	
30	31 July 2024	"Dark Room"	Tobias Rahim featuring Icekiid	
31	7 August 2024	"Dark Room"	Tobias Rahim featuring Icekiid	
32	14 August 2024	"Dark Room"	Tobias Rahim featuring Icekiid	
33	21 August 2024	"To gange"	Kesi and Lamin	
34	28 August 2024	"To gange"	Kesi and Lamin	
35	4 September 2024	"To gange"	Kesi and Lamin	
36	11 September 2024	"Tænker ik på andre"	Suspekt featuring URO	
37	18 September 2024	"Tænker ik på andre"	Suspekt featuring URO	
38	25 September 2024	"HVDOL"	Lamin	
39	2 October 2024	"Tro på det"	Lamin and Ukendt Kunstner	
40	9 October 2024	"Tænker ik på andre"	Suspekt featuring URO	
41	16 October 2024	"Tænker ik på andre"	Suspekt featuring URO	
42	23 October 2024	"Tænker ik på andre"	Suspekt featuring URO	
43	30 October 2024	"Tænker ik på andre"	Suspekt featuring URO	
44	6 November 2024	"Sammen"	Marstein and Annika	
45	13 November 2024	"Sammen"	Marstein and Annika	
46	20 November 2024	"Sammen"	Marstein and Annika	
47	27 November 2024	"Sammen"	Marstein and Annika	
48	4 December 2024	"Tinka"	Burhan G and Frida Brygmann	
49	11 December 2024	"Tinka"	Burhan G and Frida Brygmann	
50	18 December 2024	"Tinka"	Burhan G and Frida Brygmann	
51	25 December 2024	"Tinka"	Burhan G and Frida Brygmann	
52	1 January 2025	"Last Christmas"	Wham!	
53	8 January 2025	"Sammen"	Marstein and Annika	
