= List of number-one singles of 1970 (Denmark) =

This is a list of the number-one hit singles in 1970 in Denmark. The charts were produced by the IFPI Danmark and were published in the newspaper Ekstra Bladet.

Issue date	Single	Artist
No chart (Note: The chart published in Ekstra Bladet on 7 January was for the previous week, but this week's chart positions are provided in the following week's chart.)	"Här kommer Pippi Långstrump"	Inger Nilsson
15 January	"Här kommer Pippi Långstrump"	Inger Nilsson
22 January	"Här kommer Pippi Långstrump"	Inger Nilsson
29 January	"Här kommer Pippi Långstrump"	Inger Nilsson
5 February	"Här kommer Pippi Långstrump"	Inger Nilsson
12 February	"Här kommer Pippi Långstrump"	Inger Nilsson
19 February	"Här kommer Pippi Långstrump"	Inger Nilsson
26 February	"Här kommer Pippi Långstrump"	Inger Nilsson
5 March	"Här kommer Pippi Långstrump"	Inger Nilsson
12 March	"Här kommer Pippi Långstrump"	Inger Nilsson
19 March	"Här kommer Pippi Långstrump"	Inger Nilsson
28 March	"Här kommer Pippi Långstrump"	Inger Nilsson
3 April	"Här kommer Pippi Långstrump"	Inger Nilsson
9 April	"Här kommer Pippi Långstrump"	Inger Nilsson
16 April	"Här kommer Pippi Långstrump"	Inger Nilsson
23 April	"Smilende Susie"	Birgit Lystager
30 April	"Smilende Susie"	Birgit Lystager
8 May	"Här kommer Pippi Långstrump"	Inger Nilsson
14 May	"Här kommer Pippi Långstrump"	Inger Nilsson
22 May	"Här kommer Pippi Långstrump"	Inger Nilsson
28 May	"Mini-Midi-Maxi-Girl"	Bjørn Tidmand
5 June	"Up Around the Bend"	Creedence Clearwater Revival
11 June	"Up Around the Bend"	Creedence Clearwater Revival
20 June	"Up Around the Bend"	Creedence Clearwater Revival
27 June	"Cecilia"	Simon & Garfunkel
2 July	"Up Around the Bend"	Creedence Clearwater Revival
10 July	"In the Summertime"	Mungo Jerry
16 July	"In the Summertime"	Mungo Jerry
23 July	"In the Summertime"	Mungo Jerry
30 July	"In the Summertime"	Mungo Jerry
6 August	"In the Summertime"	Mungo Jerry
13 August	"In the Summertime"	Mungo Jerry
20 August	"In the Summertime"	Mungo Jerry
27 August	"In the Summertime"	Mungo Jerry
4 September	"In the Summertime"	Mungo Jerry
11 September	"In the Summertime"	Mungo Jerry
17 September	"In the Summertime"	Mungo Jerry
24 September	"In the Summertime"	Mungo Jerry
1 October	"In the Summertime"	Mungo Jerry
8 October	"Jeg har set en rigtig negermand"	Familien Andersen
15 October	"Jeg har set en rigtig negermand"	Familien Andersen
22 October	"Jeg har set en rigtig negermand"	Familien Andersen
29 October	"Jeg har set en rigtig negermand"	Familien Andersen
5 November	"Jeg har set en rigtig negermand"	Familien Andersen
12 November	"Jeg har set en rigtig negermand"	Familien Andersen
19 November	"Jeg har set en rigtig negermand"	Familien Andersen
26 November	"Jeg har set en rigtig negermand"	Familien Andersen
3 December	"Jeg har set en rigtig negermand"	Familien Andersen
10 December	"Jeg har set en rigtig negermand"	Familien Andersen
17 December	"Jeg har set en rigtig negermand"	Familien Andersen
28 December	"Jeg har set en rigtig negermand"	Familien Andersen
