= List of number-one hits of 1991 (Denmark) =

This is a list of the Danish Singles Chart number-one hits of 1991 from the International Federation of the Phonographic Industry and Nielsen Marketing Research. They were provided through Music & Media magazine under the "Top 10 Sales In Europe" section.

== Chart history ==
Week	Single	Artist
January 5	"Alle Børnene"	2 X Kaj
January 12	"Alle Børnene"	2 X Kaj
January 19	"Alle Børnene"	2 X Kaj
January 26	"Alle Børnene"	2 X Kaj
February 2	"Alle Børnene"	2 X Kaj
February 9	"Alle Børnene"	2 X Kaj
February 16	"Hugo Rap"	Skærmtrolden Hugo
February 23	"Alle Børnene"	2 X Kaj
March 2	"3 a.m. Eternal"	The KLF
March 9	"Take No Crap"	Cut 'N' Move
March 16	"Take No Crap"	Cut 'N' Move
March 23	"Take No Crap"	Cut 'N' Move
March 30	"Take No Crap"	Cut 'N' Move
April 6	"Joyride"	Roxette
April 13	"Joyride"	Roxette
April 20	"Joyride"	Roxette
April 27	"Joyride"	Roxette
May 4	"Joyride"	Roxette
May 11	"Joyride"	Roxette
May 18	"Joyride"	Roxette
May 25	"De Sku' Ha' No'En Bank"	Brian Igen-Igen
June 1	"Last Train to Trancentral"	The KLF
June 8	"Last Train to Trancentral"	The KLF
June 15	"Last Train to Trancentral"	The KLF
June 22	"De Sku' Ha' No'En Bank"	Brian Igen-Igen
June 29	"De Sku' Ha' No'En Bank"	Brian Igen-Igen
July 6	"De Sku' Ha' No'En Bank"	Brian Igen-Igen
July 13	"De Sku' Ha' No'En Bank"	Brian Igen-Igen
July 20	"The Shoop Shoop Song (It's In His Kiss)"	Cher
July 27	"(Everything I Do) I Do It for You"	Bryan Adams
August 3	"(Everything I Do) I Do It for You"	Bryan Adams
August 10	"(Everything I Do) I Do It for You"	Bryan Adams
August 17	"(Everything I Do) I Do It for You"	Bryan Adams
August 24	"(Everything I Do) I Do It for You"	Bryan Adams
August 31	"(Everything I Do) I Do It for You"	Bryan Adams
September 7	"(Everything I Do) I Do It for You"	Bryan Adams
September 14	"(Everything I Do) I Do It for You"	Bryan Adams
September 21	"(Everything I Do) I Do It for You"	Bryan Adams
September 28	"(Everything I Do) I Do It for You"	Bryan Adams
October 5	"(Everything I Do) I Do It for You"	Bryan Adams
October 12	"(Everything I Do) I Do It for You"	Bryan Adams
October 19	"(Everything I Do) I Do It for You"	Bryan Adams
October 26	"(Everything I Do) I Do It for You"	Bryan Adams
November 2	"(Everything I Do) I Do It for You"	Bryan Adams
November 9	"Spread Love"	Cut 'N' Move
November 16	"(Everything I Do) I Do It for You"	Bryan Adams
November 23	"Good Vibrations"	Marky Mark & The Funky Bunch
November 30	"Black or White"	Michael Jackson
December 7	"Black or White"	Michael Jackson
December 14	"Black or White"	Michael Jackson
December 21	"Black or White"	Michael Jackson
December 28	"Black or White"	Michael Jackson
