= List of number-one singles of 1971 (Denmark) =

This is a list of the number-one hit singles in 1971 in Denmark. The charts were produced by the IFPI Danmark and were published in the newspaper Ekstra Bladet.

Issue date	Single	Artist
7 January	"Jeg har set en rigtig negermand"	Familien Andersen
14 January	"Jeg har set en rigtig negermand"	Familien Andersen
21 January	"Jeg har set en rigtig negermand"	Familien Andersen
28 January	"Jeg har set en rigtig negermand"	Familien Andersen
4 February	"Præriens skrappe drenge"	Dirch Passer, Preben Kaas, Willy Rathnov and Paul Hagen
11 February	"Jeg har set en rigtig negermand"	Familien Andersen
18 February	"Præriens skrappe drenge"	Dirch Passer, Preben Kaas, Willy Rathnov and Paul Hagen
25 February	"Jeg har set en rigtig negermand"	Familien Andersen
4 March	"Jeg har set en rigtig negermand"	Familien Andersen
11 March	"Jeg har set en rigtig negermand"	Familien Andersen
18 March	"Jeg har set en rigtig negermand"	Familien Andersen
25 March	"Jeg har set en rigtig negermand"	Familien Andersen
1 April	"Jeg har set en rigtig negermand"	Familien Andersen
10 April	"Rose Garden"	Lynn Anderson
16 April	"Rose Garden"	Lynn Anderson
22 April	"Sam McCloud"	Grethe & Peter
29 April	"Chirpy Chirpy Cheep Cheep"	Middle of the Road
8 May	"Chirpy Chirpy Cheep Cheep"	Middle of the Road
13 May	"Chirpy Chirpy Cheep Cheep"	Middle of the Road
No chart	"Chirpy Chirpy Cheep Cheep"	Middle of the Road
No chart (Note: There was no chart published in Ekstra Bladet around 27 May, but chart data is from the following week's chart.)	"Chirpy Chirpy Cheep Cheep"	Middle of the Road
4 June	"Steen med det ekstra ben"	Per Juul
10 June	"Chirpy Chirpy Cheep Cheep"	Middle of the Road
17 June	"Chirpy Chirpy Cheep Cheep"	Middle of the Road
24 June	"Chirpy Chirpy Cheep Cheep"	Middle of the Road
1 July	"Chirpy Chirpy Cheep Cheep"	Middle of the Road
8 July	"Chirpy Chirpy Cheep Cheep"	Middle of the Road
15 July	"Chirpy Chirpy Cheep Cheep"	Middle of the Road
22 July	"Chirpy Chirpy Cheep Cheep"	Middle of the Road
29 July	"Chirpy Chirpy Cheep Cheep"	Middle of the Road
5 August	"Chirpy Chirpy Cheep Cheep"	Middle of the Road
12 August	"Tweedle Dee, Tweedle Dum"	Middle of the Road
19 August	"Tweedle Dee, Tweedle Dum"	Middle of the Road
26 August	"I Did What I Did for Maria"	Tony Christie
2 September	"I Did What I Did for Maria"	Tony Christie
9 September	"Pour un flirt"	Michel Delpech
16 September	"Pour un flirt"	Michel Delpech
23 September	"Schön ist es auf der Welt zu sein"	Roy Black and Anita Hegerland
30 September	"Schön ist es auf der Welt zu sein"	Roy Black and Anita Hegerland
7 October	"Schön ist es auf der Welt zu sein"	Roy Black and Anita Hegerland
14 October	"Butterfly"	Danyel Gérard
21 October	"Flirt (Samme sted, samme tid)"	Gitte Hænning
28 October	"Butterfly"	Danyel Gérard
4 November	"Schön ist es auf der Welt zu sein"	Roy Black and Anita Hegerland
12 November	"Schön ist es auf der Welt zu sein"	Roy Black and Anita Hegerland
18 November	"Schön ist es auf der Welt zu sein"	Roy Black and Anita Hegerland
25 November	"Schön ist es auf der Welt zu sein"	Roy Black and Anita Hegerland
3 December	"Schön ist es auf der Welt zu sein"	Roy Black and Anita Hegerland
11 December	"Schön ist es auf der Welt zu sein"	Roy Black and Anita Hegerland
16 December	"Schön ist es auf der Welt zu sein"	Roy Black and Anita Hegerland
23 December	"Schön ist es auf der Welt zu sein"	Roy Black and Anita Hegerland
