= Mekdes (singer) =

Danish-Ethiopian singer and songwriter (born 1998)

- Also known as: Mekdes Vinholt Pedersen
- Born: 1998 (age 27–28); Ethiopia
- Genres: Neo soul; pop; R&B
- Occupations: Singer; songwriter; producer
- Years active: 2018–present
- Publisher: Mermaid Records

Mekdes Vinholt Pedersen (born 1998), known mononymously as Mekdes, is a Danish–Ethiopian singer, songwriter, and producer. Releasing one studio album and two extended plays, he has been nominated for several awards in the Danish music industry, including his win at DR P3's Guld, being named as "The Talent" for 2021. He featured alongside URO to release the song "Føles godt" in 2023, which has since received triple-platinum certification from IFPI Danmark.

== Career ==
Born in Ethiopia, Mekdes was adopted and moved to Denmark at eight months old. Raised in Starup, he moved with his family to Kolding when he was 12, where he continues to live. He played handball for much of his childhood and, while in school, dropped out of a music course. Two weeks after posting his music to Instagram, he was contacted by a record label when he was 17 years old; however, he elected not to sign a contract, citing differences over the details.

Mekdes released his debut single, "Right Direction", on 15 May 2018 under the Trinity Music label. During 2019, he performed at several festivals around Denmark including Spot, NorthSide Festival, and Smukfest. In front of approximately 100 listeners, his performance at Spot marked his first concert, while his performance at Smukfest saw him win the Live Camp competition, which was scheduled to give him the honor of opening Bøgescenerne at the following year's festival. In November 2019, he was presented with the Growth Layer Award from the DPA, an association for Danish songwriters, composers, lyricists and producers. The DPA cited his dedication to songwriting and singing talent.

With the COVID-19 pandemic canceling festivals and other performances during 2020, Mekdes spent time at his home in Kolding and worked on music, ultimately releasing his debut extended play, Fly, on 28 August. The album was written, performed, and produced by Mekdes alone, aside from the track "Lonely", which was co-produced by Vasco. While citing his vocals and songwriting as a positive for Mekdes and the album itself, critics mentioned the production as a drawback. He began playing live shows again in September and October, In November 2020, he received a nomination from the Danish Music Awards as one of the new Danish live performers of the year, though he ultimately did not win the award. He became the first Danish artist to be invited to Spotify's Oyster Studio, which highlights musicians from Scandinavia, releasing the single "Give You More".

In December 2020, Mekdes announced his tour for 2021, scheduling 13 concerts between in April and May. He also returned to festivals, including GrimFest in July. In the latter half of 2021, he was nominated for DR P3's Guld award. The program described his "wild vocals and obvious natural talent" as he won his first award. Mekdes's first studio album entitled Greedy was released on 21 January 2022, after previously releasing a single of the same name in late 2021. Having self-produced the album himself, his debut received mixed reviews with critics citing a lack of "playlist-ready" singles. Receiving recognition for the production of the album from the Danish Music Awards, he was nominated for Producer of the Year, though he did not win the award.

In January 2023, URO released a song in a collaboration with Mekdes. The song, entitled "Føles godt", reached triple-platinum certification from IFPI Danmark. It was later released on URO's debut studio album, Allerhelst Vil Vi Elskes. Their song was nominated for P3's Listener Hit at the yearly P3 Guld in late 2023, though did not win the award. The duo performed the song at Roskilde Festival, Denmark's largest music festival, in June 2024. They also performed at the Crown Prince Couple's Awards ceremony in November 2024.

Mekdes released his second studio album on 9 January 2026. Entitled The Boy I Am, the album was his first after coming out as a transgender man. The album received mixed reviews.

== Personal life ==
Mekdes lives in Kolding with his partner. In November 2025, he announced he was transgender in a video posted to his Instagram.

== Discography ==
=== Studio albums ===
| Title | Details |
|---|---|
| Greedy | Released: 21 January 2022; Label: Mermaid Records; Format: CD, download |
| The Boy I Am | Released: 9 January 2026; Format: Download |

=== Extended plays ===
| Title | Details |
|---|---|
| Fly | Released: 28 August 2020; Label: Mermaid Records |
| Mekdes Synger Toppen Af Poppen | Released: 8 March 2024; Label: Mermaid Records |

=== Singles ===
| Title | Year | Peak chart positions | Certifications | Album |
| Title | Year | DEN | Certifications | Album |
|---|---|---|---|---|
| "Right Direction" | 2018 | — | | Non-album singles |
| "Out Of Here" | 2018 | — | | Non-album singles |
| "On My Mind" | 2019 | — | | Non-album singles |
| "Lose a Minute" | 2019 | — | | Non-album singles |
| "In Favor of You" | 2020 | — | | Non-album singles |
| "Lonely" | 2020 | — | | Fly |
| "Give You More" (Spotify Studio Oyster Recording) | 2020 | — | | Non-album singles |
| "Hanging Upside Down" | 2021 | — | | Non-album singles |
| "Greedy" | 2021 | — | | Greedy |
| "Du er det værd" | 2022 | — | | Non-album single |
| "Føles godt" (URO featuring Mekdes) | 2023 | 10 | IFPI DEN: 3× Platinum | Allerhelst Vil Vi Elskes |
| "Knust" | 2024 | — | | Non-album singles |
| "This Isn't Cool" | 2025 | — | | Non-album singles |
| "Easy" | 2025 | — | | Non-album singles |
| "Waiting For You" | 2025 | — | | Non-album singles |
| "Jeg håber" (KEDDE featuring Mekdes) | 2025 | — | | Non-album singles |
| "Dysphoria" | 2026 | — | | Non-album singles |
"—" denotes a recording that did not chart or was not released in that territory.

== Awards and nominations ==
| Year | Award | Category | Recipient(s) | Result | Ref. |
|---|---|---|---|---|---|
| 2020 | Danish Music Awards | New Danish Live Name of the Year | Mekdes | Nominated | |
| 2021 | P3 Guld | The Talent | Mekdes | Won | |
| 2022 | Danish Music Awards | Danish Producer of the Year | Greedy | Nominated | |
| 2023 | P3 Guld | Listener Hit | "Føles godt" (URO featuring Mekdes) | Nominated | |
