= Mille (singer) =

Danish singer and songwriter (born 2006)

- Born: Mille Liendgaard; 7 October 2006 (age 20); Aarhus, Denmark
- Genre: Pop
- Occupations: Singer; songwriter
- Years active: 2018–present
- Label: Warner Music Group

Mille Liendgaard (born 7 October 2006) is a Danish singer and songwriter. She has released one studio album and two extended plays, with two songs achieving platinum certification. In October 2025, she received the Talent award from DR P3 at their annual awards show, P3 Guld, as the top solo artist.

== Early life ==
Mille was born in Aarhus, Denmark, and grew up in the suburb of Risskov. In 2018, at the age of 11, she won MGP Junior with her song "Til næste år". She had submitted entries to the competition for four consecutive years before achieving victory. Following her win, Mille continued collaborating with a producer from the show and later moved to Copenhagen while in discussions with Warner Music Denmark.

== Career ==
Liendgaard made her debut as Mille when she released the EP Dagdrømmer on 2 February 2024. The title track from the album was certified platinum by IFPI Danmark. Mille performed her first live concert in June 2024 at the Pumpehuset's Byhaven in Copenhagen.

Mille's second EP was released on 21 February 2025. The album, entitled Vågner, received positive reviews from music critics, including four stars from Gaffa who called it an "easy-to-digest pop album". In March 2025, she announced a nationwide tour following the release of the EP, with the opening date of the tour announced for September in Grenaa.

In August, Mille featured in a song from Tobias Rahim, "Ingen Yin uden Yang", and was announced as an opener for Rahim's international tour. The song appeared on Rahim's studio album Vulkanø, released on 19 September and reached number three on the Hitlisten chart. In September 2025, Mille was announced as a finalist for the Talent award at P3's Guld awards show to take place in October. Though her song "Kendt mig en uge" did not win the Listener Hit award, she did win the Talent.

=== Debut album ===
To begin 2026, Mille announced her debut album (Over)lever on 8 January, with the release date of 23 January. The following day, she released her second single of 2026, titled "Drømmefanger" which featured URO. This followed her release of "Bag blæk og papir" on 2 January, both songs having been revealed as part of her studio debut. The album debuted at number one on the Hitlisten charts on 6 February. On 26 March, the album received gold certification.

Mille released the first half of her third EP, Værd at elske, on 10 July 2026. The second half was released on 7 August. A new song, "Du må ik gå" preceded the release on 30 June.

== Discography ==
=== Studio albums ===
Title	Details	Peak chart positions	Certifications
Title	Details	DEN	Certifications
(Over)lever	Released: 23 January 2026; Label: Warner Music Denmark; Format: CD, download	1	IFPI DEN: Platinum

=== Extended plays ===
Title	Details	Peak chart positions	Certifications
Title	Details	DEN	Certifications
Dagdrømmer	Released: 2 February 2024; Label: Warner Music Denmark	–	IFPI DEN: Gold
Vågner	Released: 21 February 2025; Label: Warner Music Denmark	6	IFPI DEN: Platinum
Værd at elske	Release date: 7 August 2026; Label: Warner Music Denmark	11	

=== Singles ===
Title	Year	Peak chart positions	Certifications	Album
Title	Year	DEN	Certifications	Album
"Til næste år"	2018	31		MGP 2018
"Dagdrømmer"	2024	36	IFPI DEN: Platinum	Dagdrømmer
"Lyver for min dagbog"	2025	—	IFPI DEN: Gold	Vågner
"Drikker med mig selv"	2025	6	IFPI DEN: Platinum	Vågner
"Kendt mig en uge"	2025	6	IFPI DEN: 2× Platinum	Non-album single
"Hørt det før" (Anton Westerlin featuring Pil, Annika, Mille, & Medina)	2025	3	IFPI DEN: Gold	Godaften
"Beholder mit tøj på"	2025	18	IFPI DEN: Gold	Non-album single
"Ingen yin uden yang" (Tobias Rahim featuring Mille)	2025	3	IFPI DEN: Platinum	Vulkanø
"Hader ik mig selv sammen med dig"	2025	6	IFPI DEN: Platinum	Non-album singles
"Bag blæk og papir"	2026	—		(Over)lever
"Drømmefanger" (featuring URO)	2026	2	IFPI DEN: Platinum	(Over)lever
"Minder hos andre Freestyle" (with Anton Westerlin)	2026	1	IFPI DEN: Gold	Bag gardinerne S1+S2
"Du må ik gå"	2026	—		Værd at elske
"Gør noget"	2026	10		Værd at elske
"—" denotes a recording that did not chart or was not released in that territory.

=== Other charted songs ===
Title	Year	Peak chart positions	Album
Title	Year	DEN	Album
"Tusind tanker"	2026	12	(Over)lever
"Alt vind og vejr" (featuring Ozzy)	2026	21	(Over)lever
"Ingen andre" (featuring Annika)	2026	7	(Over)lever
"Cirkler" (featuring Wicky)	2026	36	Værd at elske

== Awards and nominations ==
Year	Award	Category	Recipient(s)	Result	Ref.
2025	P3 Guld	The Talent	Mille	Won	
2025	P3 Guld	Listener Hit	"kendt mig en uge"	Nominated	
2026	P3 Guld	Listener Hit	"Tusind tanker"	Nominated	
