= Godaften =

2025 studio album by Anton Westerlin

Studio album by Anton Westerlin
- Released: 23 May 2025
- Genres: Dance; hip-hop; house; pop
- Length: 40:07
- Label: Universal Music Denmark
- Producer: Anton Westerlin

Anton Westerlin chronology
Godaften (2025)	Bag gardinerne S1+S2 (2026)

Singles from Godaften
- 1. "Blodigt" Released: 24 January 2025; 2. "Entré" Released: 7 March 2025; 3. "Handsome" Released: 15 May 2025

Godaften (transl. Good evening) is the debut studio album for Danish record producer Anton Westerlin. The album, published by Universal Music Denmark, released on 23 May 2025. Since its release, the album has become a number-one album in Denmark, and has been certified Platinum four times by IFPI Danmark.

== Release and reception ==
Professional ratings
Review scores
Source	Rating
Gaffa	5/6 stars
Politiken	5/6 stars
Soundvenue	4/6 stars

Westerlin began teasing the album months prior to its release, including a post on Instagram on 30 April 2025 with the caption "230525". On 15 May, he announced the album's title and a list of features included on the album. The announcement preceded the release of "Handsome", the third single released from the album. "Blodigt" and "Entré" had previously been released as singles, with both songs reaching number-one on the Danish charts.

Godaften was released on 23 May 2025. The album received generally positive reviews from Danish music critics. Reviewing the album for Gaffa, Elias Kvist awarded it five out of six stars, describing it as an unusually successful producer album that avoids monotony by using its nightlife theme to create variety across its fifteen tracks. Rasmus Weirup, for Soundvenue gave the album four out of six stars. He wrote that more selective curation of the featured artists would have resulted in a stronger album, while praising Westerlin's production. Politiken reviewer Pernille Jensen described the album as a soundtrack for the Danish summer, awarding the album five of six hearts.

Following the album's release, it first appeared on the Hitlisten charts on 4 June, becoming a number-one album in Denmark. The album has also been certified Platinum four times by IFPI Danmark. The three singles released from the album each became Platinum certified.

== Track listing ==
No.	Title	Lyrics	Producer(s)	Length
1.	"Bavæg dig lidt" (featuring Mas, Kundo, and Ozzy)	Westerlin; Artigeardit	Westerlin	1:12
2.	"Hvad er stemningen?" (featuring Mas, Kundo, and Ozzy)	Westerlin; Lea Romea; Mads Frederik Jensen; Nicolai Rakundo; Oskar Elholm	Westerlin	2:57
3.	"Handsome" (featuring Benjamin Hav, Josva, and Gilli)	Westerlin; Hav; Josva; Kian Rosenberg Larsson	Westerlin	2:31
4.	"Byens hold" (featuring Noah Carter, Kesi, and Lamin)	Westerlin; Carter; Lamin; Oliver Kesi Chambuso	Westerlin	2:44
5.	"Flueben" (featuring Lamin)	Westerlin; Lamin	Westerlin	2:19
6.	"Hørt det før" (featuring Pil, Annika, Mille, and Medina)	Westerlin; Mille; Medina; Pil; Annika	Westerlin	3:34
7.	"Hvor skal vi hen?" (featuring Mas, DJ Ary, and Sivas)	Westerlin; Ary; Jensen; Sivas Torbati	Westerlin	2:48
8.	"Blodigt" (featuring Annika)	Westerlin; Annika	Westerlin	3:02
9.	"Kaos" (featuring Wicky and Icekiid)	Westerlin; Wicky; Icekiid; Niels Dyrvig Wendelboe	Westerlin	2:33
10.	"Din energi (Prelude)"		Westerlin	0:49
11.	"Din energi" (featuring August Høyen, Artigeardit, and Bette)	Westerlin; Høyen; Artigeardit; Bette	Westerlin	3:18
12.	"Synergi" (featuring Benny Jamz and Lord Siva)	Westerlin; Lord Siva; Benjamin Small Heyn-Johnsen	Westerlin	3:09
13.	"Entré" (featuring Lamin and Ozzy)	Westerlin; Lamin; Ozzy	Westerlin	2:53
14.	"Lidt luv" (featuring Andreas Odbjerg, Artigeardit, and Lea Romea)	Westerlin; Odbjerg; Artigeardit; Romea	Westerlin	3:28
15.	"Før du går" (featuring Sira Jovina and Noah Carter)	Westerlin; Siva Jovina; Carter	Westerlin	2:42
Total length:				40:07

== Charts ==
=== Weekly charts ===
Weekly chart performance
Chart (2025–2026)	Peak position
Danish Albums (Hitlisten)	1

=== Year-end charts ===
Year-end chart performance
Chart	Year	Position
Danish Albums (Hitlisten)	2025	2

== Certifications ==
Certifications
Region	Certification	Certified units/sales
Denmark (IFPI Danmark)	4× Platinum	80,000^{‡}
^{‡} Sales+streaming figures based on certification alone.
