= URO (singer) =

Danish singer and songwriter (born 1997)

- Also known as: Jack Dawson
- Born: Jeppe Kronback; 1997 (age 28–29); Copenhagen, Denmark
- Genre: Pop
- Occupations: Singer; songwriter; producer
- Years active: 2020–present
- Label: Sony Music Denmark
- Website: enesteuro.dk

Jeppe Kronback (born 1997), known professionally as URO or Jack Dawson, is a Danish singer, songwriter, and producer. He has released one studio album and one EP, and two songs have reached the Danish top 40 charts. He has been nominated for several awards in Denmark, including two separate nominations for DR P3's Listener Hit at their 2023 and 2024 award shows.

== Early life ==
Born and raised in Vestegnen, Kronback attended a Christian school in his youth before later moving to Sankt Annæ Gymnasium in Valby. He was raised in a Christian family who were part of the Pentecostal church, including his own mother being a priest. His family left the church when he was 13 years old, when they became members of the Church of Denmark. As a teenager, he became involved with a violent football group which led to developing a drug addiction. Due to connections from his grandfather's contacts within the Pentecostal church, Kronback left Denmark and spent time living in Nakuru, Kenya, on multiple occasions. While there, he spent time working at a home for vulnerable children. Upon his first return trip to Denmark, he returned to drug use before quitting completely in May 2017.

== Career ==
Kronback grew up listening to hip-hop, and attended Sankt Annæ Gymnasium in hopes of pursuing music further. He has attributed his religious upbringing as an influence to his lyrics, though no longer sees himself as a practicing Christian. Under the name URO, Kronback released his debut single in 2020 entitled "Slåbrok". His first extended play, I storslået kinddans, med livet som indsats, was released in September 2020. From the EP, his song "Når jeg blir' til jord" reached gold certification by IFPI Danmark, becoming his first single to reach certification. The EP also reached gold certification.

In January 2023, Kronback released a song in a collaboration with fellow Danish artist Mekdes. The song, entitled "Føles godt", reached triple platinum certification from IFPI Danmark. It was later released on Kronback's debut studio album, Allerhelst vil vi elskes. The duo performed the song at the Crown Prince Couple's Awards ceremony in November 2024. Their song was nominated for DR P3's Listener Hit at the yearly P3 Guld in late 2023, though did not win the award. They later performed the song at Roskilde Festival, Denmark's largest music festival, in June 2024.

Kronback's second single from his studio album, "Godthåbsvej", saw his work reach the Danish top 40 charts for the first time when the song peaked at 15. The song also received double platinum certification. Just like "Føles godt" in 2023, the second single was also nominated for P3's Listener Hit at the 2024 Guld ceremony, though he did not win the award for a second consecutive year. The album was nominated for the Danish Album of the Year award at the Danish Music Awards in November 2024.

Kronback has performed at several festivals in Denmark, including Wonderfestiwall, Roskilde, and Grøn Koncert.

== Personal life ==
Kronback was diagnosed with ADHD and PTSD in 2022, and has also stated he previously had thoughts of suicide. His brother, Oskar, is also a singer who performs under the name Kops.

== Discography ==
=== Studio albums ===
Title	Details	Peak chart positions	Certifications
Title	Details	DEN	Certifications
Allerhelst vil vi elskes	Released: 12 April 2024; Label: Sony Music Denmark	6	IFPI DEN: Platinum
Der bor to verdener i mig	Release date: 2 October 2026; Label: Sony Music Denmark	9	

=== Extended plays ===
Title	Details	Certifications
I storslået kinddans, med livet som indsats	Released: 2 September 2020; Label: Sony Music Denmark	IFPI DEN: Gold

=== Singles ===
Title	Year	Peak chart positions	Certifications	Album
Title	Year	DEN	Certifications	Album
"Når jeg blir' til jord"	2020	—	IFPI DEN: Gold	I storslået kinddans, med livet som indsats
"Mand på en nat"	2020	—		I storslået kinddans, med livet som indsats
"Værd at vente på"	2021	—		Non-album singles
"Havernes duft"	2021	—		Non-album singles
"Skyggen af solen"	2022	—		Non-album singles
"Føles godt" (URO featuring Mekdes)	2023	10	IFPI DEN: 3× Platinum	Allerhelst vil vi elskes
"Godthåbsvej"	2023	15	IFPI DEN: 2× Platinum	Allerhelst vil vi elskes
"Bare en dreng"	2024	—		Allerhelst vil vi elskes
"Tænker ik på andre" (Suspekt featuring URO)	2024	1	IFPI DEN: 3× Platinum	Non-album singles
"Min bror"	2024	39	IFPI DEN: Platinum	Non-album singles
"Happy Days"	2025	—		Non-album singles
"Drømmefanger" (Mille featuring URO)	2026	2	IFPI DEN: Platinum	(Over)lever
"Kanten"	2026	—		Non-album single
"Min bror" (acoustic version)	2026	—		Non-album single
"Nirvana"	2026	—		Der bor to verdener i mig
"Dø ung"	2026	—		Der bor to verdener i mig
"Min bedste ven (live fra Knæk Cancer)"	2026	—		Non-album single
"—" denotes a recording that did not chart or was not released in that territory.

== Awards and nominations ==
Year	Award	Category	Recipient(s)	Result	Ref.
2023	P3 Guld	Listener Hit	"Føles Godt" (URO feat. Mekdes)	Nominated	
2024	Danish Music Awards	Danish Album of the Year	Allerhelst Vil Vi Elskes	Nominated	
2024	Danish Music Awards	Danish Songwriter of the Year	URO	Nominated	
2024	P3 Guld	Listener Hit	"Godthåbsvej"	Nominated	
2025	GAFFA Awards	Danish Hip-hop Release of the Year	Allerhelst Vil Vi Elskes	Nominated	
