= List of number-one singles of 1969 (Denmark) =

This is a list of the number-one hit singles in 1969 in Denmark. The charts were produced by the IFPI Danmark and were published in the newspaper Ekstra Bladet. Prior to April 1969, the IFPI had produced a monthly chart, but switched to a weekly chart after the closure of the Danmarks Radio Top 20 chart.

Issue date	Single	Artist
No chart (Note: There was no chart published in Ekstra Bladet around 12 April, but the previous week's chart positions are provided in the following week's chart.)	"Don't Pass Me By"	The Beatles
19 April	"Don't Pass Me By"	The Beatles
26 April	"Casatschok"	Birthe Kjær
No chart (Note: There was no chart published in Ekstra Bladet around 3 May, but chart data is from the following week's chart.)	"Get Back"	The Beatles with Billy Preston
10 May	"Get Back"	The Beatles with Billy Preston
16 May	"Get Back"	The Beatles with Billy Preston
24 May	"Get Back"	The Beatles with Billy Preston
No chart (Note: There was no chart published in Ekstra Bladet around 30 May, but chart data is from the following week's chart.)	"Get Back"	The Beatles with Billy Preston
6 June	"The Ballad of John and Yoko"	The Beatles
14 June	"The Ballad of John and Yoko"	The Beatles
21 June	"The Ballad of John and Yoko"	The Beatles
26 June	"The Ballad of John and Yoko"	The Beatles
3 July	"Tomorrow Tomorrow"	Bee Gees
10 July	"Tomorrow Tomorrow"	Bee Gees
17 July	"The Ballad of John and Yoko"	The Beatles
24 July	"The Ballad of John and Yoko"	The Beatles
31 July	"Honky Tonk Women"	The Rolling Stones
7 August	"Honky Tonk Women"	The Rolling Stones
14 August	"Saved by the Bell"	Robin Gibb
21 August	"Saved by the Bell"	Robin Gibb
28 August	"Saved by the Bell"	Robin Gibb
4 September	"Je t'aime... moi non plus"	Serge Gainsbourg and Jane Birkin
11 September	"Je t'aime... moi non plus"	Serge Gainsbourg and Jane Birkin
18 September	"Je t'aime... moi non plus"	Serge Gainsbourg and Jane Birkin
25 September	"Je t'aime... moi non plus"	Serge Gainsbourg and Jane Birkin
2 October	"Je t'aime... moi non plus"	Serge Gainsbourg and Jane Birkin
9 October	"Je t'aime... moi non plus"	Serge Gainsbourg and Jane Birkin
16 October	"Je t'aime... moi non plus"	Serge Gainsbourg and Jane Birkin
24 October	"Je t'aime... moi non plus"	Serge Gainsbourg and Jane Birkin
30 October	"Sugar, Sugar"	The Archies
6 November	"Sugar, Sugar"	The Archies
14 November	"Sugar, Sugar"	The Archies
21 November	"Sugar, Sugar"	The Archies
27 November	"Sugar, Sugar"	The Archies
6 December	"Sugar, Sugar"	The Archies
12 December	"Sugar, Sugar"	The Archies
18 December	"Sugar, Sugar"	The Archies
No chart (Note: There was no chart published in Ekstra Bladet around 25 December, but chart data is from the following week's chart.)	"Sugar, Sugar"	The Archies
No chart (Note: There was no chart published in Ekstra Bladet around 31 December, but the chart published in the issue from 7 January 1970 was for the previous week.)	"Prøv og drøm noget smukt"	Ole Hegelund
