= List of number-one hits of 1994 (Denmark) =

This is a list of the Danish Singles Chart number-one hits of 1994 from the International Federation of the Phonographic Industry and Nielsen Soundscan. They were provided through Billboard magazine under the "Hits of the World" section.

== Chart history ==
Issue date	Song	Artist
1 January	"The Sign"	Ace Of Base
8 January	"All For Love"	Bryan Adams, Rod Stewart & Sting
15 January	"All For Love"	Bryan Adams, Rod Stewart & Sting
22 January	"All For Love"	Bryan Adams, Rod Stewart & Sting
29 January	"All For Love"	Bryan Adams, Rod Stewart & Sting
5 February	"All For Love"	Bryan Adams, Rod Stewart & Sting
12 February	"All For Love"	Bryan Adams, Rod Stewart & Sting
19 February	"All For Love"	Bryan Adams, Rod Stewart & Sting
26 February	"All For Love"	Bryan Adams, Rod Stewart & Sting
5 March	"All For Love"	Bryan Adams, Rod Stewart & Sting
12 March	"All For Love"	Bryan Adams, Rod Stewart & Sting
19 March	"All For Love"	Bryan Adams, Rod Stewart & Sting
26 March	"Look Who's Talking"	Dr. Alban
2 April	"All For Love"	Bryan Adams, Rod Stewart & Sting
9 April	"Look Who's Talking"	Dr. Alban
16 April	"The Most Beautiful Girl In The World"	The Artist (Formerly Known As Prince)
23 April	"The Most Beautiful Girl In The World"	The Artist (Formerly Known As Prince)
30 April	"The Most Beautiful Girl In The World"	The Artist (Formerly Known As Prince)
7 May	"The Most Beautiful Girl In The World"	The Artist (Formerly Known As Prince)
14 May	"The Most Beautiful Girl In The World"	The Artist (Formerly Known As Prince)
21 May	"The Most Beautiful Girl In The World"	The Artist (Formerly Known As Prince)
28 May	"The Most Beautiful Girl In The World"	The Artist (Formerly Known As Prince)
4 June	"The Most Beautiful Girl In The World"	The Artist (Formerly Known As Prince)
11 June	"Mmm Mmm Mmm Mmm"	Crash Test Dummies
18 June	"Come On You Reds"	The Manchester United Football Squad with Status Quo
25 June	"Come On You Reds"	The Manchester United Football Squad with Status Quo
2 July	"Come On You Reds"	The Manchester United Football Squad with Status Quo
9 July	"Come On You Reds"	The Manchester United Football Squad with Status Quo
16 July	"Come On You Reds"	The Manchester United Football Squad with Status Quo
23 July	"Come On You Reds"	The Manchester United Football Squad with Status Quo
30 July	"Come On You Reds"	The Manchester United Football Squad with Status Quo
6 August	"Baby, I Love Your Way"	Big Mountain
13 August	"Baby, I Love Your Way"	Big Mountain
20 August	"Baby, I Love Your Way"	Big Mountain
27 August	"Love Is All Around"	Wet Wet Wet
3 September	"Love Is All Around"	Wet Wet Wet
10 September	"Love Is All Around"	Wet Wet Wet
17 September	"Love Is All Around"	Wet Wet Wet
24 September	"I Swear"	All-4-One
1 October	"Love Is All Around"	Wet Wet Wet
8 October	"Cotton Eye Joe"	Rednex
15 October	"Cotton Eye Joe"	Rednex
22 October	"Cotton Eye Joe"	Rednex
29 October	"Cotton Eye Joe"	Rednex
5 November	"Cotton Eye Joe"	Rednex
12 November	"Cotton Eye Joe"	Rednex
19 November	"Cotton Eye Joe"	Rednex
26 November	"Cotton Eye Joe"	Rednex
3 December	"Cotton Eye Joe"	Rednex
10 December	"Cotton Eye Joe"	Rednex
17 December	"Cotton Eye Joe"	Rednex
24 December	"Cotton Eye Joe"	Rednex
31 December	"Cotton Eye Joe"	Rednex

== See also ==
- 1994 in music
