= List of number-one hits of 1988 (Denmark) =

This is a list of the Danish Singles Chart number-one hits of 1988 from the International Federation of the Phonographic Industry and Nielsen Marketing Research. They were provided through Music & Media magazine under the "Top 10 Sales In Europe" section.

== Chart history ==
Week	Single	Artist
January 9	"Sjæl I flammer"	Kasper Winding & Lars Muhl
January 16	no chart published in Music Media	
January 21	"Sjæl I flammer"	Kasper Winding & Lars Muhl
January 30	"Sjæl I flammer"	Kasper Winding & Lars Muhl
February 6	"Sjæl I flammer"	Kasper Winding & Lars Muhl
February 13	"Sjæl I flammer"	Kasper Winding & Lars Muhl
February 20	"Du Si'r Dit Hjerte Er Hårdt Som Sten"	Søs Fenger & Lars Muhl
February 27	"Den Jeg Elsker Elsker Jeg"	Søs Fenger, Thomas Helmig, Sanne Salomonsen & Anne Linnet
March 5	"Den Jeg Elsker Elsker Jeg"	Søs Fenger, Thomas Helmig, Sanne Salomonsen & Anne Linnet
March 12	"Den Jeg Elsker Elsker Jeg"	Søs Fenger, Thomas Helmig, Sanne Salomonsen & Anne Linnet
March 19	"Den Jeg Elsker Elsker Jeg"	Søs Fenger, Thomas Helmig, Sanne Salomonsen & Anne Linnet
March 26	"Den Jeg Elsker Elsker Jeg"	Søs Fenger, Thomas Helmig, Sanne Salomonsen & Anne Linnet
April 2	"Den Jeg Elsker Elsker Jeg"	Søs Fenger, Thomas Helmig, Sanne Salomonsen & Anne Linnet
April 9	"Den Jeg Elsker Elsker Jeg"	Søs Fenger, Thomas Helmig, Sanne Salomonsen & Anne Linnet
April 16	"Tell It To My Heart"	Taylor Dayne
April 23	"Stay On These Roads"	A-Ha
April 30	"Stay On These Roads"	A-Ha
May 7	"Stay On These Roads"	A-Ha
May 14	"Hulubulu"	Mathilde
May 21	"Hulubulu"	Mathilde
May 28	"En For Alle"	EM Holdet
June 4	"En For Alle"	EM Holdet
June 11	"En For Alle"	EM Holdet
June 18	"En For Alle"	EM Holdet
June 25	"En For Alle"	EM Holdet
July 2	"En For Alle"	EM Holdet
July 9	"En For Alle"	EM Holdet
July 16	"En For Alle"	EM Holdet
July 23	"En For Alle"	EM Holdet
July 30	"En For Alle"	EM Holdet
August 6	"Tougher Than The Rest"	Bruce Springsteen
August 13	"Tougher Than The Rest"	Bruce Springsteen
August 20	"Tougher Than The Rest"	Bruce Springsteen
August 27	"Tougher Than The Rest"	Bruce Springsteen
September 3	"Tougher Than The Rest"	Bruce Springsteen
September 10	"Tougher Than The Rest"	Bruce Springsteen
September 17	"You Came"	Kim Wilde
September 24	"You Came"	Kim Wilde
October 1	"You Came"	Kim Wilde
October 8	"You Came"	Kim Wilde
October 15	"You Came"	Kim Wilde
October 22	"The Only Way Is Up"	Yazz and The Plastic Population
October 29	"The Only Way Is Up"	Yazz and The Plastic Population
November 5	"The Only Way Is Up"	Yazz and The Plastic Population
November 12	"A Groovy Kind Of Love"	Phil Collins
November 19	"A Groovy Kind Of Love"	Phil Collins
November 26	"A Groovy Kind Of Love"	Phil Collins
December 3	"A Groovy Kind Of Love"	Phil Collins
December 10	"A Groovy Kind Of Love"	Phil Collins
December 17	"A Groovy Kind Of Love"	Phil Collins
December 24	no chart published in Music Media	
December 31	no chart published in Music Media	
