= List of number-one hits of 1992 (Denmark) =

This is a list of the Danish Singles Chart number-one hits of 1992 from the International Federation of the Phonographic Industry and Nielsen Marketing Research. They were provided through Music & Media magazine under the "Top 10 Sales In Europe" section.

== Chart history ==
| Week | Single | Artist |
|---|---|---|
| January 4 | "Black Or White" | Michael Jackson |
| January 11 | "Black Or White" | Michael Jackson |
| January 18 | "Turn Up The Music" | Dr. Baker |
| January 25 | "Turn Up The Music" | Dr. Baker |
| February 1 | "Turn Up The Music" | Dr. Baker |
| February 8 | "Turn Up The Music" | Dr. Baker |
| February 15 | "Turn Up The Music" | Dr. Baker |
| February 22 | "Turn Up The Music" | Dr. Baker |
| February 29 | "Justified & Ancient" | The KLF |
| March 7 | "Justified & Ancient" | The KLF |
| March 14 | "Leningrad" | Kim Larsen |
| March 21 | "Leningrad" | Kim Larsen |
| March 28 | "Leningrad" | Kim Larsen |
| April 4 | "America: What Time Is Love?" | The KLF |
| April 11 | "America: What Time Is Love?" | The KLF |
| April 18 | "Human Touch" | Bruce Springsteen |
| April 25 | "To Be With You" | Mr. Big |
| May 2 | "To Be With You" | Mr. Big |
| May 9 | "To Be With You" | Mr. Big |
| May 16 | "To Be With You" | Mr. Big |
| May 23 | "To Be With You" | Mr. Big |
| May 30 | "To Be With You" | Mr. Big |
| June 6 | "To Be With You" | Mr. Big |
| June 13 | "To Be With You" | Mr. Big |
| June 20 | "Nothing Else Matters" | Metallica |
| June 27 | "Nothing Else Matters" | Metallica |
| July 4 | "Too Funky" | George Michael |
| July 11 | "Abba-esque" | Erasure |
| July 18 | "Abba-esque" | Erasure |
| July 25 | "Abba-esque" | Erasure |
| August 1 | "Abba-esque" | Erasure |
| August 8 | "Abba-esque" | Erasure |
| August 15 | "Abba-esque" | Erasure |
| August 22 | "Abba-esque" | Erasure |
| August 29 | "Abba-esque" | Erasure |
| September 5 | "Abba-esque" | Erasure |
| September 12 | "Abba-esque" | Erasure |
| September 19 | "Abba-esque" | Erasure |
| September 26 | "Abba-esque" | Erasure |
| October 3 | "Abba-esque" | Erasure |
| October 10 | "All That She Wants" | Ace Of Base |
| October 17 | "All That She Wants" | Ace Of Base |
| October 24 | "All That She Wants" | Ace Of Base |
| October 31 | "All That She Wants" | Ace Of Base |
| November 7 | "All That She Wants" | Ace Of Base |
| November 14 | "All That She Wants" | Ace Of Base |
| November 21 | "All That She Wants" | Ace Of Base |
| November 28 | "All That She Wants" | Ace Of Base |
| December 5 | "All That She Wants" | Ace Of Base |
| December 12 | "All That She Wants" | Ace Of Base |
| December 19 | "All That She Wants" | Ace Of Base |
| December 26 | Unknown | Unknown |
