= List of number-one singles of 1972 (Denmark) =

This is a list of the number-one hit singles in 1972 in Denmark. The charts were produced by the IFPI Danmark and were published in the newspaper Ekstra Bladet and, from October, broadcast on Danmarks Radio.

Issue date	Single	Artist
6 January	"Fut i fejemøjet"	John Mogensen
13 January	"Fut i fejemøjet"	John Mogensen
20 January	"Fut i fejemøjet"	John Mogensen
27 January	"Fut i fejemøjet"	John Mogensen
3 February	"Fut i fejemøjet"	John Mogensen
10 February	"Fut i fejemøjet"	John Mogensen
17 February	"Fut i fejemøjet"	John Mogensen
24 February	"Fut i fejemøjet"	John Mogensen
2 March	"Fut i fejemøjet"	John Mogensen
9 March	"Fut i fejemøjet"	John Mogensen
17 March	"Fut i fejemøjet"	John Mogensen
23 March	"Fut i fejemøjet"	John Mogensen
3 April	"Fut i fejemøjet"	John Mogensen
7 April	"How Do You Do"	Mouth & MacNeal
13 April	"How Do You Do"	Mouth & MacNeal
20 April	"How Do You Do"	Mouth & MacNeal
27 April	"How Do You Do"	Mouth & MacNeal
4 May	"How Do You Do"	Mouth & MacNeal
12 May	"How Do You Do"	Mouth & MacNeal
18 May	"How Do You Do"	Mouth & MacNeal
26 May	"Sømanden og stjernen"	The Comets
1 June	"Sømanden og stjernen"	The Comets
9 June	"Sømanden og stjernen"	The Comets
17 June	"Uakadi Uakadu"	I Nuovi Angeli
22 June	"Sømanden og stjernen"	The Comets
29 June	"Sylvia's Mother"	Dr. Hook & the Medicine Show
6 July	"Erik Oluf Andersen"	John Mogensen
13 July	"Døllefjælde-Musse"	Blue Boys
20 July	"Døllefjælde-Musse"	Blue Boys
27 July	"Angelina"	Olsen
3 August	"Slabadubadelle"	Mette & the Cometes
10 August	"Slabadubadelle"	Mette & the Cometes
17 August	"Slabadubadelle"	Mette & the Cometes
24 August	"Slabadubadelle"	Mette & the Cometes
1 September	Bare der er sol i dine øjne"	Gustav Winckler and Bent Werther
8 September	Bare der er sol i dine øjne"	Gustav Winckler and Bent Werther
14 September	Bare der er sol i dine øjne"	Gustav Winckler and Bent Werther
21 September	Bare der er sol i dine øjne"	Gustav Winckler and Bent Werther
28 September	Bare der er sol i dine øjne"	Gustav Winckler and Bent Werther
5 October	Bare der er sol i dine øjne"	Gustav Winckler and Bent Werther
12 October	Bare der er sol i dine øjne"	Gustav Winckler and Bent Werther
19 October	Bare der er sol i dine øjne"	Gustav Winckler and Bent Werther
26 October	"Wig-Wam Bam"	The Sweet
2 November	"Wig-Wam Bam"	The Sweet
9 November	"Wig-Wam Bam"	The Sweet
16 November	"Jeg er så ked a' – den hænger ned a'"	Lille Palle
23 November	"Jeg er så ked a' – den hænger ned a'"	Lille Palle
30 November	"Jeg er så ked a' – den hænger ned a'"	Lille Palle
7 December	"Jeg er så ked a' – den hænger ned a'"	Lille Palle
14 December	"Jeg er så ked a' – den hænger ned a'"	Lille Palle
21 December	"Jeg er så ked a' – den hænger ned a'"	Lille Palle
