= List of number-one albums and singles of 1974 (Denmark) =

This is a list of the number-one hit albums and singles in 1974 in Denmark. The charts were produced by the IFPI Danmark and were published in the newspaper Ekstra Bladet as well as broadcast on Danmarks Radio. The charts were compiled from album and single sales. At the end of August, Danmarks Radio stopped broadcasting the IFPI chart due to uncertainty over how it was compiled and decided to produce its own chart. Ekstra Bladet also stopped publishing the IFPI chart and began publishing the Danmarks Radio chart. The IFPI chart continued to be published in Billboard magazine's Hits of the World section; however, they were not published every week and the chart corresponded to the date two weeks before the Billboard publication date.

Issue date	Single/Album	Artist
9 January	Gasolin' 3 (LP)	Gasolin'
16 January	Gasolin' 3 (LP)	Gasolin'
24 January	Forever and Ever (LP)	Demis Roussos
30 January	Forever and Ever (LP)	Demis Roussos
6 February	Forever and Ever (LP)	Demis Roussos
13 February	Forever and Ever (LP)	Demis Roussos
20 February	Forever and Ever (LP)	Demis Roussos
28 February	Forever and Ever (LP)	Demis Roussos
6 March	Forever and Ever (LP)	Demis Roussos
13 March	Forever and Ever (LP)	Demis Roussos
20 March	My Only Fascination (LP)	Demis Roussos
27 March	Johnny Reimar Party 7 (LP)	Johnny Reimar
3 April	My Only Fascination (LP)	Demis Roussos
10 April	Johnny Reimar Party 7 (LP)	Johnny Reimar
17 April	Gasolin' (LP)	Gasolin'
24 April	Gasolin' (LP)	Gasolin'
1 May	Gasolin' (LP)	Gasolin'
8 May	"Waterloo"	ABBA
15 May	"Waterloo"	ABBA
22 May	Sweet Fanny Adams (LP)	The Sweet
29 May	"Seasons in the Sun"	Terry Jacks
5 June	Die Welt ist voll Musik (LP)	Freddy Breck
12 June	Die Welt ist voll Musik (LP)	Freddy Breck
19 June	Die Welt ist voll Musik (LP)	Freddy Breck
26 June	A Show Just for You (LP)	Walkers
3 July	A Show Just for You (LP)	Walkers
10 July	A Show Just for You (LP)	Walkers
17 July	Caribou (LP)	Elton John
25 July	Caribou (LP)	Elton John
31 July	"The Six Teens"	The Sweet
7 August	"Sugar Baby Love"	The Rubettes
14 August	"Sugar Baby Love"	The Rubettes
22 August	"Sugar Baby Love"	The Rubettes
No chart	"Sugar Baby Love"	The Rubettes
From Billboard	Oldies but Goodies (LP)	Svenne and Lotta
From Billboard	"Sugar Baby Love"	The Rubettes
From Billboard	"The Night Chicago Died"	Paper Lace
From Billboard	No chart data available	
From Billboard	Kaj & Andrea (LP)	Kaj & Andrea
From Billboard	Johnny Reimar Party 8 (LP)	Johnny Reimar
From Billboard	No chart data available	
From Billboard	No chart data available	
From Billboard	No chart data available	
From Billboard	Kaj & Andrea (LP)	Kaj & Andrea
From Billboard	No chart data available	
From Billboard	No chart data available	
From Billboard	No chart data available	
From Billboard	No chart data available	
From Billboard	Desolation Boulevard (LP)	The Sweet
