= List of number-one albums and singles of 1973 (Denmark) =

This is a list of the number-one hit albums and singles in 1973 in Denmark. The charts were produced by the IFPI Danmark and were published in the newspaper Ekstra Bladet as well as broadcast on Danmarks Radio. From May 1973, album sales were mixed with those for single to create a combined chart. This was due to the decline of the singles market compared to the growing popularity of albums.

Issue date	Single	Artist
3 January	"Jeg er så ked a' – den hænger ned a'"	Lille Palle
10 January	"Smedens vise"	Lille Palle
17 January	"Jeg er så ked a' – den hænger ned a'"	Lille Palle
24 January	"Jeg er så ked a' – den hænger ned a'"	Lille Palle
1 February	"Block Buster!"	The Sweet
7 February	"Block Buster!"	The Sweet
16 February	"Block Buster!"	The Sweet
21 February	"Hjerter af honning"	Mette with Erik Hansens Studiegruppe
1 March	"Hjerter af honning"	Mette with Erik Hansens Studiegruppe
7 March	"Mama Loo"	The Les Humphries Singers
14 March	"Mama Loo"	The Les Humphries Singers
21 March	"Mama Loo"	The Les Humphries Singers
28 March	"Mama Loo"	The Les Humphries Singers
4 April	"Mama Loo"	The Les Humphries Singers
12 April	"Mama Loo"	The Les Humphries Singers
18 April	"Mama Loo"	The Les Humphries Singers
26 April	"Mama Loo"	The Les Humphries Singers
2 May	"Mama Loo"	The Les Humphries Singers
10 May	"Power to All Our Friends"	Cliff Richard
16 May	"Garden Party"	Rick Nelson and the Stone Canyon Band
23 May	"Power to All Our Friends"	Cliff Richard
30 May	"Hell Raiser"	The Sweet
6 June	"Hell Raiser"	The Sweet
13 June	"Ring Ring"	Björn & Benny, Agnetha & Anni-Frid
20 June	"Hell Raiser"	The Sweet
27 June	Pure Gold (LP)	Various artists
4 July	Pure Gold (LP)	Various artists
11 July	Pure Gold (LP)	Various artists
18 July	Pure Gold (LP)	Various artists
25 July	Pure Gold (LP)	Various artists
1 August	"Überall auf der Welt"	Freddy Breck
8 August	Pure Gold (LP)	Various artists
16 August	"Überall auf der Welt"	Freddy Breck
22 August	"Überall auf der Welt"	Freddy Breck
29 August	"Überall auf der Welt"	Freddy Breck
5 September	Überall auf der Welt (LP)	Freddy Breck
13 September	Überall auf der Welt (LP)	Freddy Breck
19 September	Überall auf der Welt (LP)	Freddy Breck
26 September	Überall auf der Welt (LP)	Freddy Breck
3 October	Überall auf der Welt (LP)	Freddy Breck
11 October	Überall auf der Welt (LP)	Freddy Breck
18 October	Überall auf der Welt (LP)	Freddy Breck
24 October	Überall auf der Welt (LP)	Freddy Breck
31 October	Überall auf der Welt (LP)	Freddy Breck
7 November	Überall auf der Welt (LP)	Freddy Breck
14 November	Überall auf der Welt (LP)	Freddy Breck
21 November	Überall auf der Welt (LP)	Freddy Breck
28 November	Gasolin' 3 (LP)	Gasolin'
6 December	Gasolin' 3 (LP)	Gasolin'
12 December	Over havet under himlen (LP)	Sebastian
19 December	Over havet under himlen (LP)	Sebastian
27 December	Over havet under himlen (LP)	Sebastian
