= List of number-one hits of 1990 (Denmark) =

This is a list of the Danish Singles Chart number-one hits of 1990 from the International Federation of the Phonographic Industry and Nielsen Marketing Research. They were provided through Music & Media magazine under the "Top 10 Sales In Europe" section.

== Chart history ==
Month	Single	Artist
January	"Tarzan Mamma Mia"	Kim Larsen & Bellami
January	"Tarzan Mamma Mia"	Kim Larsen & Bellami
January	"Tarzan Mamma Mia"	Kim Larsen & Bellami
January	"Tarzan Mamma Mia"	Kim Larsen & Bellami
February	"Tarzan Mamma Mia"	Kim Larsen & Bellami
February	"Tarzan Mamma Mia"	Kim Larsen & Bellami
February	"Tarzan Mamma Mia"	Kim Larsen & Bellami
February	"Tarzan Mamma Mia"	Kim Larsen & Bellami
March	"Tarzan Mamma Mia"	Kim Larsen & Bellami
March	"Tarzan Mamma Mia"	Kim Larsen & Bellami
March	"Enjoy The Silence"	Depeche Mode
March	"Nothing Compares 2 U"	Sinéad O'Connor
March	"Nothing Compares 2 U"	Sinéad O'Connor
April	"Nothing Compares 2 U"	Sinéad O'Connor
April	"Nothing Compares 2 U"	Sinéad O'Connor
April	"Nothing Compares 2 U"	Sinéad O'Connor
April	"Nothing Compares 2 U"	Sinéad O'Connor
May	"Bubbers Badekar"	Bubber
May	"Bubbers Badekar"	Bubber
May	"Bubbers Badekar"	Bubber
May	"Bubbers Badekar"	Bubber
June	"Bubbers Badekar"	Bubber
June	"Bubbers Badekar"	Bubber
June	"Bubbers Badekar"	Bubber
June	"Mogensen Mix"	Rockrosinen & Pølseenderne
June	"Mogensen Mix"	Rockrosinen & Pølseenderne
July	"Mogensen Mix"	Rockrosinen & Pølseenderne
July	"Mogensen Mix"	Rockrosinen & Pølseenderne
July	"Mogensen Mix"	Rockrosinen & Pølseenderne
July	"Mogensen Mix"	Rockrosinen & Pølseenderne
August	"Mogensen Mix"	Rockrosinen & Pølseenderne
August	"Mogensen Mix"	Rockrosinen & Pølseenderne
August	"Mogensen Mix"	Rockrosinen & Pølseenderne
August	"Mogensen Mix"	Rockrosinen & Pølseenderne
September	"Mogensen Mix"	Rockrosinen & Pølseenderne
September	"It Must Have Been Love"	Roxette
September	"It Must Have Been Love"	Roxette
September	"It Must Have Been Love"	Roxette
September	"It Must Have Been Love"	Roxette
October	"It Must Have Been Love"	Roxette
October	"It Must Have Been Love"	Roxette
October	"Jeg Er Bar' Så Go'"	Trussetyven
October	"Jeg Er Bar' Så Go'"	Trussetyven
November	"Jeg Er Bar' Så Go'"	Trussetyven
November	"Jeg Er Bar' Så Go'"	Trussetyven
November	"Jeg Er Bar' Så Go'"	Trussetyven
November	"Jeg Er Bar' Så Go'"	Trussetyven
December	"Jeg Er Bar' Så Go'"	Trussetyven
December	"Jeg Er Bar' Så Go'"	Trussetyven
December	"Jeg Er Bar' Så Go'"	Trussetyven
December	"Alle Børnene"	2 X Kaj
December	"Alle Børnene"	2 X Kaj
