= List of number-one hits of 1989 (Denmark) =

This is a list of the Danish Singles Chart number-one hits of 1989 from the International Federation of the Phonographic Industry and Nielsen Marketing Research. They were provided through Music & Media magazine under the "Top 10 Sales In Europe" section.

== Chart history ==
Week	Single	Artist
January 1	"Two Hearts"	Phil Collins
January 4	no chart published in Music Media	
January 14	"Jul det' cool"	MC Einar
January 21	"Jul det' cool"	MC Einar
January 28	"Jul det' cool"	MC Einar
February 4	"Jul det' cool"	MC Einar
February 11	"Crackers International"	Erasure
February 18	"Crackers International"	Erasure
February 25	"Crackers International"	Erasure
March 4	"Bring Me Edelweiss"	Edelweiss
March 11	"Bring Me Edelweiss"	Edelweiss
March 18	"Bring Me Edelweiss"	Edelweiss
March 25	"Bring Me Edelweiss"	Edelweiss
April 1	"Like A Prayer"	Madonna
April 8	"Like A Prayer"	Madonna
April 15	"Like A Prayer"	Madonna
April 22	"Like A Prayer"	Madonna
April 29	"Like A Prayer"	Madonna
May 6	"Like A Prayer"	Madonna
May 13	"Like A Prayer"	Madonna
May 20	"Like A Prayer"	Madonna
May 27	"Like A Prayer"	Madonna
June 3	"Like A Prayer"	Madonna
June 10	"Like A Prayer"	Madonna
June 17	"The Look"	Roxette
June 24	"The Look"	Roxette
July 1	"The Look"	Roxette
July 8	"The Look"	Roxette
July 15	"Tarzan Mamma Mia"	Kim Larsen & Bellami
July 22	"Tarzan Mamma Mia"	Kim Larsen & Bellami
July 29	"Tarzan Mamma Mia"	Kim Larsen & Bellami
August 5	"Tarzan Mamma Mia"	Kim Larsen & Bellami
August 12	"Tarzan Mamma Mia"	Kim Larsen & Bellami
August 19	"Tarzan Mamma Mia"	Kim Larsen & Bellami
August 26	"Tarzan Mamma Mia"	Kim Larsen & Bellami
September 2	"Tarzan Mamma Mia"	Kim Larsen & Bellami
September 9	"Tarzan Mamma Mia"	Kim Larsen & Bellami
September 16	"Tarzan Mamma Mia"	Kim Larsen & Bellami
September 23	"Tarzan Mamma Mia"	Kim Larsen & Bellami
September 30	"Swing The Mood"	Jive Bunny and The Mastermixers
October 1	"Swing The Mood"	Jive Bunny and The Mastermixers
October 14	"Swing The Mood"	Jive Bunny and The Mastermixers
October 21	"Tarzan Mamma Mia"	Kim Larsen & Bellami
October 28	"Tarzan Mamma Mia"	Kim Larsen & Bellami
November 4	"Tarzan Mamma Mia"	Kim Larsen & Bellami
November 11	"Tarzan Mamma Mia"	Kim Larsen & Bellami
November 18	"Tarzan Mamma Mia"	Kim Larsen & Bellami
November 25	"Tarzan Mamma Mia"	Kim Larsen & Bellami
December 2	"Tarzan Mamma Mia"	Kim Larsen & Bellami
December 9	"Tarzan Mamma Mia"	Kim Larsen & Bellami
December 16	"Tarzan Mamma Mia"	Kim Larsen & Bellami
December 23	"Tarzan Mamma Mia"	Kim Larsen & Bellami
December 30	no chart published in Music Media	
