= Jeg har set en rigtig negermand =

Single by Familien Andersen
- B-side: "Den lille fyr"
- Released: September 1970
- Recorded: 1970
- Genre: Children
- Length: 2:55
- Label: Polydor
- Songwriter: Niels C. Andersen
- Producer: Johnny Reimar

Familien Andersen singles chronology
| "Jeg har set en rigtig negermand" (1970) | "Hej, sol – skin på mig!" (1971) |

"Jeg har set en rigtig negermand" ("I have seen a real negro man") is a Danish children's song that became extremely popular in the 1970s. It was first sung by four-year-old Bo Andersen with Familien Andersen in 1970, and quickly gained platinum status in Denmark, selling 165,000 copies.

== Background ==
In 1970, the Andersen Family won the "best Danish band" competition sponsored by the newspaper Ekstra Bladet. As a result, the family won a recording contract with Polydor Records, and released "Jeg har set en rigtig negermand" as its first single. At the same time, the family was performing under contract at Tivoli Gardens, increasing the family's popularity, especially that of "Little Bo", the 4-year-old lead singer who would go on to achieve fame as a child actor.

== Lyrics and reception ==
The song describes different people of varying colors: "en rigtig negermand...sort...som en tjærespand" (a real negro man, black as a bucket of tar), "en indianermand...rød...som en ildebrand" (an Indian, red as a fire), and "en kinesermand...gul...som en sodavand" (a Chinese man, yellow as a bottle of soda"). While some have interpreted this song as carrying a message of racial equality, others have criticized it for its racist language. The former argument focuses on the lyrics, "all people [to] be painted blue, to be funnier to look at, and then black and red and yellow and white live together in a world without strife." and "Let not the color of skin be a factor. We must meet with wholesome and honest minds."

The song has fallen into varying degrees of disfavor as the lyrics use terms and similes considered incorrect by some Danes. However, it is still a recognizable song learned by children even now.

The song became known more internationally after its appearance in Thomas Vinterberg's 1998 film Festen. In one scene, the brother of the protagonist sings the song with the intention of hurling racial abuse at a black party guest with whom he has just had a quarrel, so he stands up and calls for every party guest to join him in singing the song. The singer's sister, who is the black man's girlfriend, then tells the latter that it is "a fucking racist song". Only the first verse of the song is used in the movie, thus angering some that argued this facilitated a misunderstanding of the song as based on racism and xenophobia, while others praise the director's use of the song as a way to highlight the everyday racism that continues to persist in Denmark.

== Chart performance ==
The single topped the Danish IFPI chart for a total of twenty-three weeks in 1970 and 1971, spending thirty-seven weeks in the top twenty. It was the second-best selling single of 1970 (losing out to "Här kommer Pippi Långstrump" by Inger Nilsson) and was also the second-best selling single of 1971 (losing out to "Chirpy Chirpy Cheep Cheep" by Middle of the Road).

Familien Andersen would go on to release a further four singles. The follow-up, "Hej, sol – skin på mig!" ("Hey, sun – shine on me!"), taken from the film Far til fire i højt humør in which Bo Andersen also starred, peaked at number three on the IFPI chart in September 1971. Their only other top-twenty single was "Ratiti", which peaked at number twenty in September 1972. They also released two albums; the first was a Christmas album, Jul med Familien Andersen, which peaked at number 3 on the IFPI monthly album chart in December 1970.
