= Cut 'N' Move =

Danish dance/hip hop group

- Origin: Århus, Denmark
- Genres: Eurodance, hip house
- Years active: 1989–1997
- Labels: SoulPower, Epic, Medley
- Past members: Per Holm; Jørn K MC Zipp; Thera Hoeymans (1990–94); Zindy Laursen (1993–96)

Cut 'N' Move were a Danish dance/hip hop group from Århus.

== Career ==
=== 1989–1992: Origins and debut album ===
The group was founded in 1989 by keyboard player Per Holm, disc jockey Jørn K (Jørn Kristensen), and rapper MC Zipp (Jens Kjær Larsen). In December 1990 singer Thera Hoeymans joined the group.

Their debut single "Take No Crap" featured vocals by Danish singer Christine Christiansen and was released in 1990. The following year the single was released internationally as "Get Serious". The song became a moderate hit on the Billboard Hot 100 and a top 10 hit on the dance chart. Their debut album, Get Serious, was released on Epic Records in 1991 and was a moderate success in dance clubs in Europe. The album sold 53,000 copies in Denmark, with an additional 200,000 copies worldwide. In 1992, the group was awarded three Danish Grammy Awards for Danish Newcomer of the Year, Danish Hit of the Year ("Get Serious"), and Danish Rap/Dance Album of the Year (Get Serious).

=== 1993–1994: Second album: Peace, Love & Harmony and departure of Thera Hoeymans ===
For their second album, Peace, Love & Harmony (1993), Danish-American singer Zindy Laursen joined the group. On the album Zindy provided lead vocals on four tracks, while Thera Hoeymans sang lead vocals on two tracks. Their cover of the KC & the Sunshine Band song "Give it Up" went to number-one in Australia for four weeks in 1994. The track reached number 61 in the UK Singles Chart.

In March 1994, Thera Hoeymans left the group to pursue a career as a theatre actor.

=== 1995: Third and final album: The Sound of Now ===
Cut 'N' Move released their third and final studio album, The Sound of Now, in 1995. They scored a minor hit in the US with lead single "I'm Alive", which went to number 46 on the Hot Dance Club Play chart. The song reached number 49 in the UK chart.

=== 1996: Greatest hits and disbanding ===
In 1996 Cut 'N' Move released the greatest hits album Into the Zone '91-'96 which included three new songs. The album was awarded Danish Dance Album of the Year at the Danish Grammy Awards.

The group disbanded in 1997.

In a retrospective article in 2009, Politiken called Cut 'N' Move "a kind of big sister to the 90s' biggest Danish hit group Aqua" and wrote: "18 years later the band still stands as a milestone in Danish music. Cut 'N' Move was simply the band that brought dance music to the country".

== Discography ==
=== Studio albums ===
List of albums, with chart positions
| Title | Album details | Peak chart positions | |
| Title | Album details | AUS | GER |
|---|---|---|---|
| Get Serious | Released: 1991; Format: CD; Label: SoulPower Productions (SPCD 0002) | - | - |
| Peace, Love & Harmony | Released: 1993; Format: CD; Label: SoulPower Productions (SPCD0006) | 97 | 62 |
| The Sound of Now | Released: 1995; Format: CD; Label: Medley Records (EMI 8335952) | - | - |

=== Compilation albums ===
List of compilation albums, with details
| Title | Details |
|---|---|
| Into the Zone '91-'96 | Released: 1996; Format: CD; Label: Medley Records (EMI 8523272) |
| Hits 'n' Remix | Released: 2003; Format: 2×CD; Label: EMI (EMI 5938312) |
| Get Serious - De Største Hits | Released: 2009; Format: CD, Digital; Label: EMI (EMI 6954212) |

=== Singles ===
List of singles, with chart positions
| Year | Title | Peak chart positions | | | | | | | | | | | Certifications | Album |
| Year | Title | DEN | AUS | AUT | GER | NLD | NOR | NZ | SWI | UK | US | US Dance | Certifications | Album |
|---|---|---|---|---|---|---|---|---|---|---|---|---|---|---|
| 1990 | "Take No Crap" | 1 | — | — | — | — | — | — | — | — | — | — | | Get Serious |
| 1991 | "Get Serious" | — | — | — | — | — | — | — | — | 98 | 76 | 8 | | Get Serious |
| 1991 | "Spread Love" | 1 | — | — | — | — | — | — | — | — | — | 9 | | Get Serious |
| 1993 | "Give It Up" | 1 | 1 | 6 | 6 | 30 | 2 | 5 | 34 | 61 | — | — | AUS: Platinum; GER: Gold | Peace, Love & Harmony |
| 1993 | "Peace, Love & Harmony" | — | 35 | — | — | — | — | — | — | — | — | — | | Peace, Love & Harmony |
| 1993 | "Sunshine" | — | 92 | — | 85 | — | — | — | — | — | — | — | | Peace, Love & Harmony |
| 1995 | "I'm Alive" | 4 | — | 21 | 61 | — | — | — | — | 49 | — | 46 | | The Sound of Now |
| 1995 | "Real Emotion" | — | — | — | — | — | — | — | — | — | — | — | | The Sound of Now |
| 1996 | "Missionary Man" | — | 137 | — | — | — | — | — | — | — | — | — | | Into the Zone '91-'96 |
| 1996 | "Upside Down" | — | — | — | — | — | — | — | — | — | — | — | | Into the Zone '91-'96 |
"—" denotes items which were not released in that country or failed to chart.
