= Annika Wedderkopp =

Danish actress and singer (born 2004)

Annika
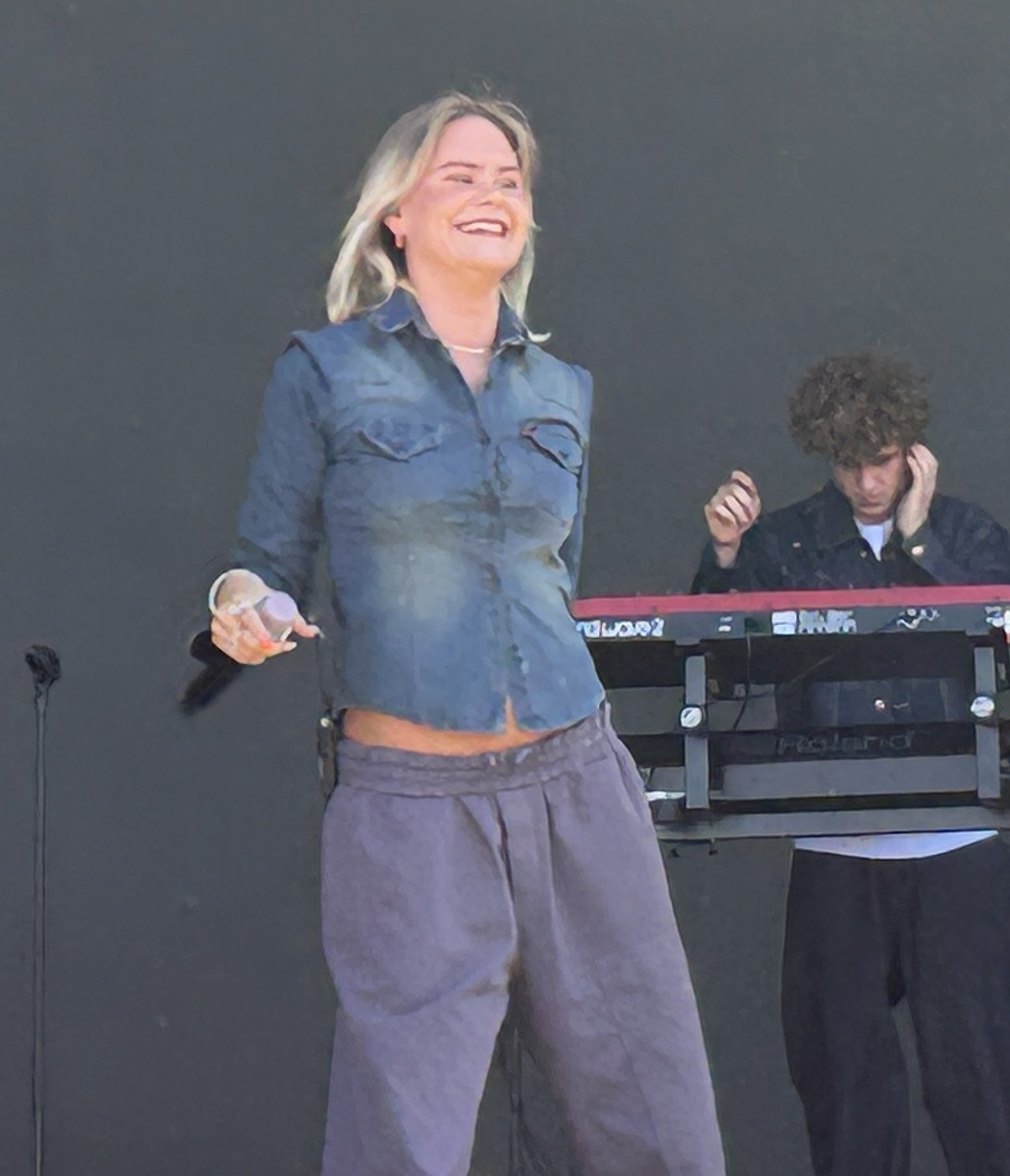
- Wedderkopp at Slottsfjellfestivalen 2025

Background information
- Also known as: Youngmammi
- Born: Annika Hedegaard Wedderkopp; 14 December 2004 (age 21)
- Origin: Vejby, Denmark
- Genre: Pop
- Occupations: Actress; singer; songwriter
- Instruments: Vocals; piano
- Years active: 2017; 2024–present
- Label: Universal
- Formerly of: Maja & Annika
- Website: annikaw.dk

Annika Hedegaard Wedderkopp (born 14 December 2004), known mononymously as Annika, is a Danish actress and singer. As a child, she starred in The Hunt (2012) opposite Mads Mikkelsen. As a singer signed to Universal Music Denmark, she has charted three number-one songs in Denmark, starting in 2024 with "Sammen", a collaboration with Marstein. The song also reached number-one in Norway, marking her second after "Så længe jeg er sexy". Her debut album, AW, topped the Danish albums chart in 2025 and has been certified quadruple-platinum by IFPI Danmark.

== Early life and education ==
Annika Hedegaard Wedderkopp was born on 14 December 2004 and grew up in Vejby in North Zealand. At the age of six, she was cast as Klara in the Danish drama film The Hunt (2012); in the film, her character's lies lead to a male teacher (played by Mads Mikkelsen) being wrongly accused of sexually abusing her. She subsequently had a small role in the film Man Divided (2017).

Wedderkopp started writing songs at the age of seven, and competed in the 2017 edition of MGP Junior at the age of twelve. In the song contest, she and classmate Maja Løve Nielsen entered with "Ikke mere", a song they wrote themselves. In 2024, she completed her gymnasium education at Gribskov Gymnasium.

== Career ==
In March 2023, Wedderkopp started uploading music to TikTok just for fun under the alias Youngmammi, which led to her getting attention from the music industry. Her posts usually feature acoustic covers or self-written songs while playing a grand piano. Wedderkopp was offered a recording contract three months before finishing gymnasium. She released her first single, "Knuser hjerter", in March 2024 through Universal, which became the most-streamed song in Denmark on Spotify after a few days. It reached the top five of the singles chart in Denmark and was followed up by her debut EP, Nye tider, released in May 2024.

Her single "Så længe jeg er sexy" was successful in both Denmark and Norway, becoming her first number-one single in the latter. The follow-up single "Sammen", a collaboration with Norwegian rapper Marstein, reached number-one in both countries.

In October 2024, Wedderkopp won the P3 Guld award in the category of P3 Talentet, along with its prize of 100,000 DKK. The next month, she won in the category of New Danish Name of the Year (Årets nye danske navn) at the Danish Music Awards. She was also nominated in the category of Danish Hit of the Year for "Knuser hjerter". At age 20, she became the youngest performer to open the Orange Stage at Roskilde Festival on 2 July 2025, together with 22 year old Norwegian Marstein. In December 2025, she was named as the third most-streamed artist in Denmark on Spotify.

== Filmography ==
- The Hunt (2012), Klara
- Man Divided (2017), Sarah

== Discography ==
=== Studio albums ===
List of studio albums, with chart positions
| Title | Details | Peak chart positions | | Certifications |
| Title | Details | DEN | NOR | Certifications |
|---|---|---|---|---|
| AW | Released: 8 May 2025; Label: Universal; Format: Digital download, streaming | 1 | 84 | IFPI DEN: 6× Platinum |

=== EPs ===
List of EPs, with chart positions
| Title | Year | Peak chart positions | Certifications |
| Title | Year | DEN | Certifications |
|---|---|---|---|
| Nye tider | 2024 | 9 | IFPI DEN: Platinum |

=== Singles ===
List of singles, with year released and chart positions
| Title | Year | Peak positions | | Certifications | Album |
| Title | Year | DEN | NOR | Certifications | Album |
|---|---|---|---|---|---|
| "Knuser hjerter" | 2024 | 5 | — | IFPI DEN: 3× Platinum | Nye tider |
| "Nye tider" | 2024 | 37 | — | IFPI DEN: Gold | Nye tider |
| "Så længe jeg er sexy" | 2024 | 3 | 1 | IFPI DEN: 2× Platinum; IFPI NOR: Platinum | Non-album single |
| "Sammen" (with Marstein) | 2024 | 1 | 1 | IFPI DEN: 2× Platinum; IFPI NOR: 2× Platinum | Frihet i lenker |
| "Luk mig ind" | 2024 | 3 | — | IFPI DEN: 2× Platinum | Non-album singles |
| "Livsforladt" | 2026 | 1 | — | | Non-album singles |
| "Jaloux" (live) | 2026 | 32 | — | | Non-album singles |
| "Desperado" | 2026 | 1 | — | | Non-album singles |
| "Hvis jeg er uden dig" | 2026 | 1 | — | | Non-album singles |

=== Featured singles ===
List of singles, with year released and chart positions
| Single | Year | Peak positions | Certifications | Album |
| Single | Year | DEN | Certifications | Album |
|---|---|---|---|---|
| "Blodigt" (Anton Westerlin featuring Annika) | 2025 | 1 | IFPI DEN: 2× Platinum | Godaften |

=== Other charted songs ===
List of songs, with year charted and chart positions
| Song | Year | Peak positions | Certifications | Album |
| Song | Year | DEN | Certifications | Album |
|---|---|---|---|---|
| "Hun" | 2024 | 19 | IFPI DEN: Platinum | Nye tider |
| "Tilbage" | 2025 | — | IFPI DEN: Gold | Nye tider |
| "Der så meget jeg ikke fortæller" | 2025 | 13 | | AW |
| "Bliv her lidt endnu" (featuring Josva) | 2025 | 2 | IFPI DEN: Platinum | AW |
| "Lad mig lande" | 2025 | 12 | | AW |
| "Du ik værd at græde for" (featuring Sira Jovina) | 2025 | 8 | IFPI DEN: Gold | AW |
| "Brugt mine dage" | 2025 | 17 | IFPI DEN: Gold | AW |
| "Start på ny" | 2025 | 22 | | AW |
| "Stolt" (featuring Lamin) | 2025 | 1 | IFPI DEN: 2× Platinum | AW |
| "Jeg er din" | 2025 | 21 | | AW |
| "Bar bund" (featuring Gilli) | 2025 | 3 | IFPI DEN: Platinum | AW |
| "Drukner i os" | 2025 | 27 | | AW |
| "Hva det var" | 2025 | 28 | | AW |
| "Vis mig" | 2025 | 37 | | AW |
| "Hørt det før" (Anton Westerlin featuring Pil, Annika, Mille and Medina) | 2025 | 3 | IFPI DEN: Platinum | Godaften |

== Awards and nominations ==
| Award | Year | Category | Nominee(s) | Result | Ref. |
|---|---|---|---|---|---|
| Danish Music Awards | 2024 | New Danish Name of the Year | Annika | Won | |
| Danish Music Awards | 2024 | Danish Hit of the Year | "Knuser hjerter" | Nominated | |
| Gaffa Awards | 2025 | New Danish Name of the Year | Annika | Nominated | |
| Gaffa Awards | 2025 | Danish Pop Release of the Year | Nye tider | Nominated | |
| P3 Guld | 2024 | P3 Talentet | Annika | Won | |
| P3 Guld | 2025 | P3 Prisen | Annika | Nominated | |
| P3 Guld | 2025 | P3 Lytterhittet | "Stolt" (featuring Lamin) | Nominated | |
| P3 Guld | 2026 | P3 Prisen | Annika | Won | |
| P3 Guld | 2026 | P3 Lytterhittet | "Drukner" (with Gilli) | Nominated | |
| Spellemannprisen | 2024 | Song of the Year | "Sammen" (with Marstein) | Nominated | |
| Gaffa Awards | 2026 | Album of the Year | AW | Won | |
