= Karl William =

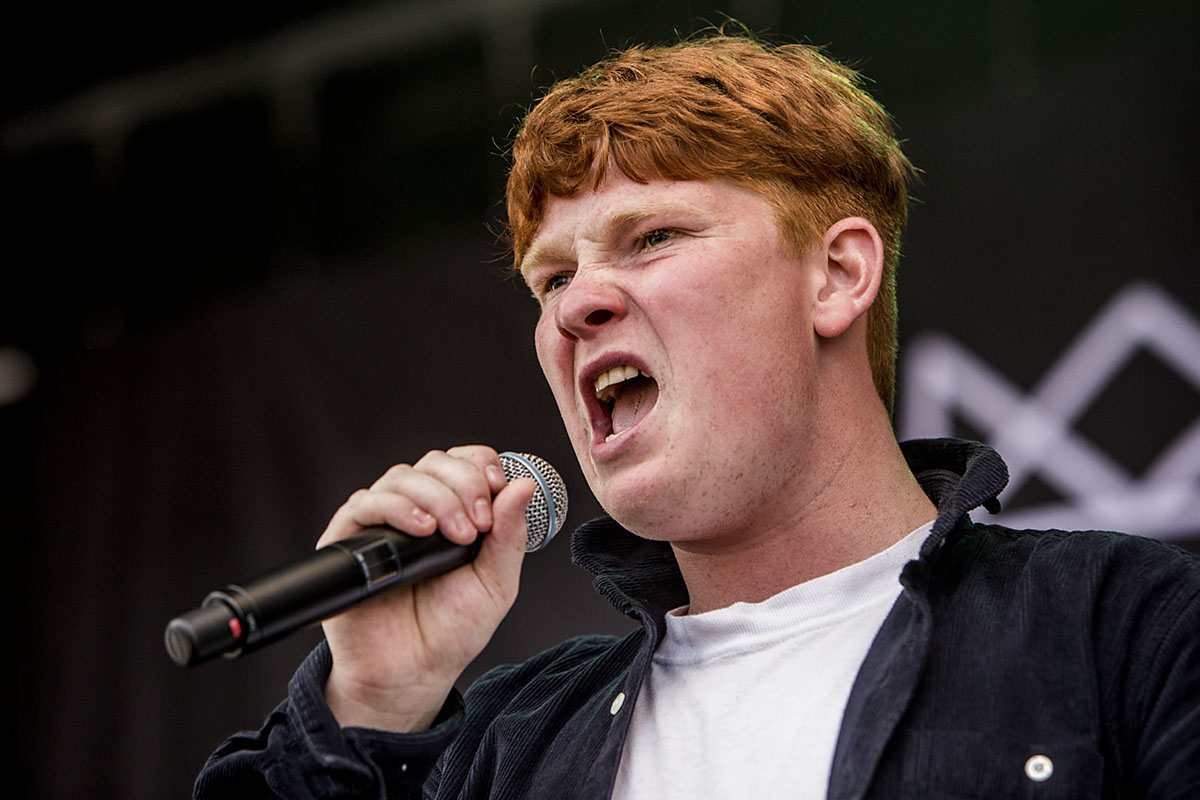
- William in 2014

Background information
- Born: 1 January 1995 (age 31)
- Genres: Alternative music
- Occupations: Singer, songwriter
- Instrument: Vocals
- Years active: 2013–present
- Label: ArtPeople

Karl William (born 1 January 1995) is a Danish alternative music singer and songwriter who is signed to the Danish ArtPeople label.

He caught attention with "Kostumeramt" as part of the Aarhus-based Hukaos collective made up of William, Tais and Louis Rustum with the track's appearance on the collective's EP release 1. sal. But it was with his EP Døende that he found chart success reaching number 8 on Tracklisten, the official Danish Albums Chart. The album was produced by Eloq (of Cheff Records), Tais (Hukaos collective), Carl Barsk and Emil Hesselbæk. "Foruden at forgude" and its accompanying music video is the second major song release after "Kostumeramt".

== Discography ==
=== Albums / EPs ===
Year	Title	Peak positions
Year	Title	DEN
2014	Døende	8
2015	Placebo	26
2016	Livet EP	28
2018	Livet, faldet & alt det andet	36
2022	Ren	38
2024	Langsomt er den hurtigste vej frem	

=== Singles ===
Year	Title	Peak positions	Album
Year	Title	DEN	Album
2014	"Foruden at forgude"	–	Døende

Appearances

- 2013: "Kostumeramt" (on Hukaos collective EP 1.sal)
