= The Strokes discography =

American rock Band The Stokes discography

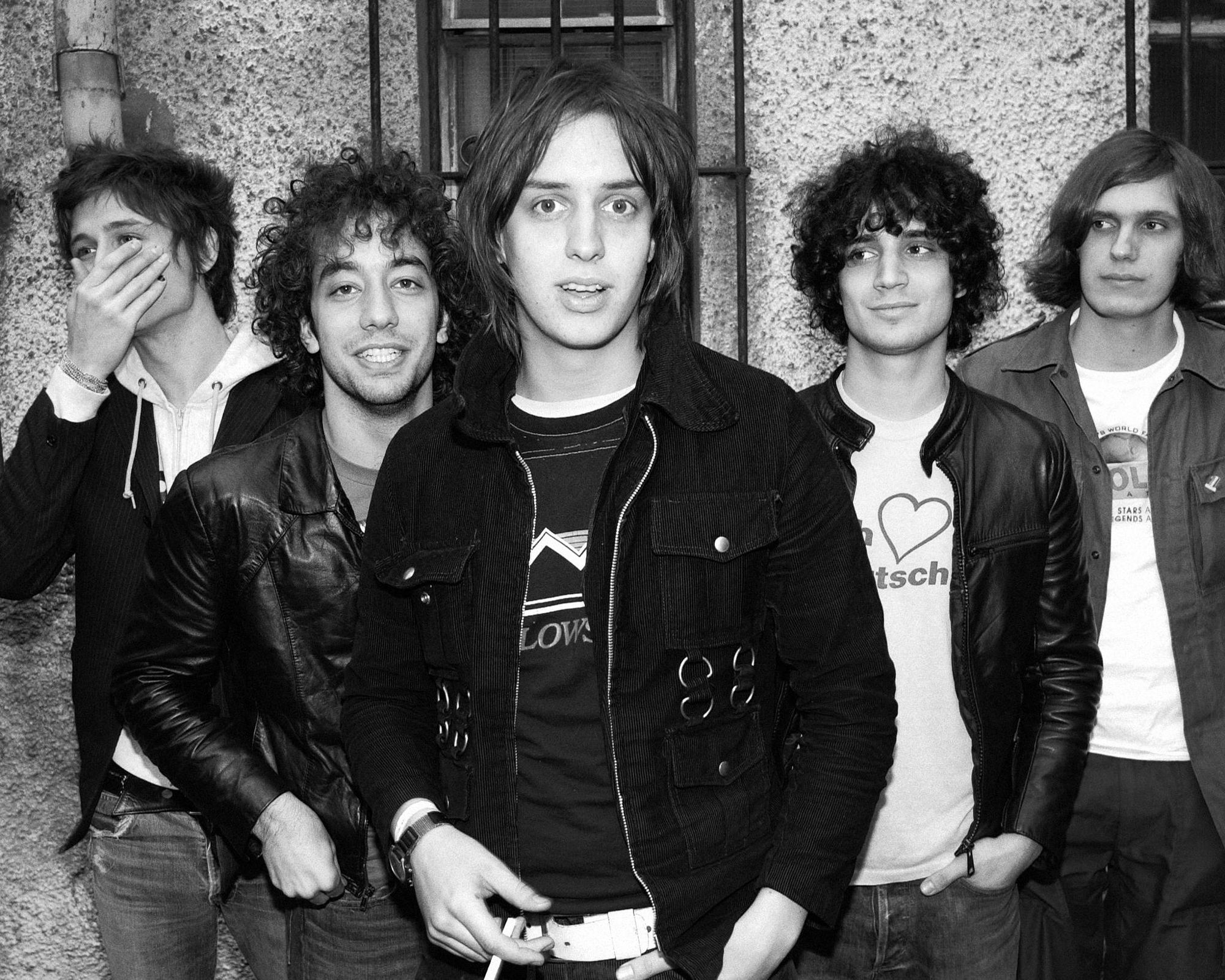
- The Strokes in 2002
- Studio albums: 7
- Extended plays: 2
- Compilation albums: 1
- Singles: 18
- Video albums: 1
- Music videos: 20
- Promotional singles: 7

The Strokes are an American rock band. Formed in New York City in 1998, the group consists of singer Julian Casablancas, guitarists Nick Valensi and Albert Hammond Jr., bassist Nikolai Fraiture and drummer Fabrizio Moretti. The Strokes discography consists of seven studio albums, two extended plays (EP), eighteen singles, seven promotional singles, one video album, one compilation album and twenty music videos.

In January 2001, the Strokes released a demo EP, The Modern Age, on independent record label Rough Trade. The large amount of hype generated by the record, especially among the British music press, led to a bidding war among major record labels. The band signed with RCA Records, and released its debut LP Is This It in October 2001. Helped by lead single "Hard to Explain", the album debuted at number two in the UK and number 33 on the Billboard 200. Highly acclaimed by critics, Is This It was certified platinum in the US and UK, selling over two million copies worldwide.

The Strokes released their next LP, Room on Fire, in October 2003. The album did well on the charts, reaching number two and going platinum in the UK, while peaking at the fourth spot in the US. Three singles were released from the album, the highest-charting of which was "12:51", which reached number seven in the UK. The band's third album First Impressions of Earth was released in January 2006. Although critics suggested the post-Christmas release date was an indication of the band's lower expectations of the record, it was the first Strokes album to top the UK charts. "Juicebox" became the first single by the group to break into the Billboard Hot 100, and was its highest-charting effort in Britain, where it reached number five.

Released after a five-year hiatus, The Strokes' fourth album Angles (2011) became their third consecutive LP to chart at number four on the Billboard 200. Its 2013 follow-up Comedown Machine reached number ten on both the U.S. and British charts. In 2016 the Strokes released their second EP, Future Present Past. The band's latest full-length album is Reality Awaits, released in July 2026.

== Albums ==
=== Studio albums ===
List of studio albums, with selected chart positions, sales figures and certifications
Title	Album details	Peak chart positions										Sales	Certifications
Title	Album details	US	AUS	CAN	FRA	GER	IRL	JPN	NZ	SWE	UK	Sales	Certifications
Is This It	Released: October 9, 2001; Label: RCA; Formats: CD, LP, cassette, download	33	5	50	19	28	4	44	23	3	2	US: 1,000,000	RIAA: Platinum; ARIA: 2× Platinum; BPI: 3× Platinum; IFPI SWE: Platinum; MC: Platinum; RIAJ: Gold; RMNZ: Gold
Room on Fire	Released: October 28, 2003; Label: RCA; Formats: CD, LP, cassette, download	4	6	2	16	6	2	6	6	6	2	US: 597,000	RIAA: Platinum; ARIA: Platinum; BPI: Platinum; MC: Gold; RIAJ: Gold; RMNZ: Gold
First Impressions of Earth	Released: January 3, 2006; Label: RCA; Formats: CD, LP, cassette. download	4	4	3	9	11	3	12	10	9	1	US: 310,000	RIAA: Gold; ARIA: Gold; BPI: Gold; RIAJ: Gold; RMNZ: Gold; SNEP: Gold
Angles	Released: March 22, 2011; Label: RCA; Formats: CD, LP, download	4	1	4	6	15	3	6	6	21	3	US: 221,000; UK: 170,000	ARIA: Platinum; BPI: Gold
Comedown Machine	Released: March 26, 2013; Label: RCA; Formats: CD, LP, download	10	7	17	17	50	9	9	18	28	10	US: 77,000	BPI: Silver
The New Abnormal	Released: April 10, 2020; Label: RCA, Cult; Formats: CD, LP, cassette, download	8	21	21	20	12	12	16	15	31	3	US: 35,000	BPI: Gold; RMNZ: Gold; SNEP: Gold
Reality Awaits	Released: July 24, 2026; Label: RCA, Cult; Formats: CD, LP, download	13	10	60	12	11	10	44	11	32	8		

=== Compilation albums ===
List of compilation albums, with selected chart positions
Title	Album details	Peak chart positions					
Title	Album details	US Sales	US Alt.	US Rock	SCO	SPA Vinyl	UK Sales
The Singles – Volume 1	Released: February 24, 2023; Format: 10×7" singles (reissues) box set; Label: Sony	32	25	49	64	15	89

== Extended plays ==
List of EPs, with selected chart positions
Title	EP details	Peak chart positions					
Title	EP details	CAN Dig.	FRA	NOR	SCO	UK	UK Indie
The Modern Age	Released: January 29, 2001; Label: Rough Trade, Beggars Banquet; Formats: CD, LP	28	—	20	57	68	10
Future Present Past	Released: June 3, 2016; Label: Cult; Formats: LP, download	—	144	—	—	— (Note: Future Present Past did not enter the UK Albums Chart, but peaked at number 30 on the UK Physical Singles Chart.)	—
"—" denotes a recording that did not chart or was not released in that territory.

== Singles ==
=== 2000s ===
List of singles released in the 2000s, showing selected chart positions and certifications
Title	Year	Peak chart positions										Certifications	Album
Title	Year	US	US Alt.	AUS	CAN	GER	IRL	NLD	SPA	SWE	UK	Certifications	Album
"Hard to Explain"	2001	— (Note: "Hard to Explain" did not enter the Billboard Hot 100, but peaked at number 27 on the Hot Singles Sales chart.)	27	66	7	—	10	—	—	56	16	BPI: Silver	Is This It
"Last Nite"	2001	— (Note: "Last Nite" did not enter the Billboard Hot 100, but peaked at number 8 on the Bubbling Under Hot 100 Singles chart, which acts as an extension to the Hot 100.)	5	47	—	—	48	—	—	—	14	RIAA: Platinum; ARIA: Platinum; BPI: 2× Platinum; PROMUSICAE: Platinum	Is This It
"Someday"	2001	—	17	—	—	—	—	84	—	—	27	RIAA: Platinum; BPI: Platinum; PROMUSICAE: Gold	Is This It
"12:51"	2003	—	15	—	30	—	22	40	—	39	7	BPI: Silver	Room on Fire
"Reptilia"	2004	—	19	68	22	—	—	—	—	—	17	RIAA: Platinum; ARIA: Gold; BPI: Platinum; PROMUSICAE: Platinum	Room on Fire
"The End Has No End"	2004	—	35	—	—	—	42	—	—	—	27		Room on Fire
"Juicebox"	2005	98	9	44	4	100	18	98	14	50	5		First Impressions of Earth
"Heart in a Cage"	2006	—	21	—	—	—	—	—	—	—	25		First Impressions of Earth
"You Only Live Once"	2006	— (Note: "You Only Live Once" did not enter the Billboard Hot 100, but peaked at number 14 on the Hot Singles Sales chart.)	35	52	—	—	—	—	—	—	—	RIAA: Gold; ARIA: Gold; BPI: Silver; PROMUSICAE: Gold	First Impressions of Earth
"—" denotes a recording that did not chart or was not released in that territory.

=== 2010s and 2020s ===
List of singles released in the 2010s and 2020s, showing selected chart positions and certifications
Title	Year	Peak chart positions										Certifications	Album
Title	Year	US Bub.	US Rock	CAN	FRA	IRL	JPN	NZ Hot	POR	SCO	UK	Certifications	Album
"Under Cover of Darkness"	2011	16	23	88	75	46	9	—	—	31	47	RIAA: Gold; ARIA: Gold; BPI: Silver	Angles
"Taken for a Fool"	2011	—	— (Note: "Taken for a Fool" did not enter the US Hot Rock & Alternative Songs, but peaked at number 32 on the US Alternative Airplay chart.)	—	—	—	—	—	—	—	—		Angles
"All the Time"	2013	—	47	—	—	—	29	—	—	—	— (Note: "All the Time" did not enter the UK Singles Chart, but peaked at number 12 on the UK Physical Singles Chart.)		Comedown Machine
"Oblivius"	2016	— (Note: "Oblivius" did not enter the Billboard Hot 100, but peaked at number one on the Hot Singles Sales chart.)	19	—	60	—	—	—	—	42	178		Future Present Past
"At the Door"	2020	—	18	—	—	—	—	—	—	—	—		The New Abnormal
"Bad Decisions"	2020	—	6	—	—	—	—	—	—	—	—		The New Abnormal
"Brooklyn Bridge to Chorus"	2020	—	7	—	—	—	—	24	148	—	—		The New Abnormal
"Going Shopping"	2026	—	30	—	—	—	— (Note: "Going Shopping" did not enter the Japan Hot 100, but peaked at number 10 on the Japan Hot Overseas chart.)	28	—	—	—		Reality Awaits
"Falling Out of Love"	2026	—	—	—	—	—	—	40	—	—	—		Reality Awaits
"—" denotes a recording that did not chart or was not released in that territory.	2026												Reality Awaits

=== Promotional singles ===
List of promotional singles, with selected chart positions and certifications, showing year released and album name
Title	Year	Peak chart positions										Certifications	Album
Title	Year	US Rock	BEL (FL) Tip	CAN	FRA	JPN	MEX Eng.	NZ Hot	POR	SCO	UK	Certifications	Album
"The Modern Age"	2002	—	—	28	—	—	—	—	—	57	68		Is This It
"Machu Picchu"	2011	—	34	—	87	—	26	—	—	—	—		Angles
"One Way Trigger" (Note: "One Way Trigger" was only released as a free promotional download.)	2013	—	—	—	167	57	32	—	—	—	—		Comedown Machine
"Tap Out"	2013	—	—	—	—	—	—	—	—	—	—		Comedown Machine
"Drag Queen"	2016	—	—	—	—	—	49	—	—	—	—		Future Present Past
"Threat of Joy"	2016	—	— (Note: "Threat of Joy" did not enter the Flanders Ultratop 50, but charted as an "extra tip" on the Ultratip chart.)	—	—	—	40	—	—	—	—		Future Present Past
"The Adults Are Talking"	2020	8	10	—	—	—	—	18	141	—	—	AFP: Gold; AMPROFON: 4× Platinum+Gold; BPI: Platinum; RMNZ: Platinum; SNEP: Platinum	The New Abnormal
"—" denotes a recording that did not chart or was not released in that territory.

=== Other singles ===
Title	Year	Note	Album
"Elephant Song"	2004	Released as a limited edition fan club exclusive.	Non-album single

== Other charted songs ==
List of songs, with selected chart positions, showing year released and album name
Title	Year	Peak chart positions			Album
Title	Year	US Rock	BEL (FL) Tip	NZ Hot	Album
"Happy Ending"	2013	—	17	—	Comedown Machine
"Selfless"	2020	14	—	25	The New Abnormal
"Eternal Summer"	2020	17	—	28	The New Abnormal
"Why Are Sundays So Depressing"	2020	25	—	—	The New Abnormal
"Not the Same Anymore"	2020	29	—	—	The New Abnormal
"Ode to the Mets"	2020	27	—	—	The New Abnormal
"Psycho Shit"	2026	—	—	19	Reality Awaits
"Dine N'Dash"	2026	47	—	17	Reality Awaits
"Going to Babble On"	2026	—	—	20	Reality Awaits
"—" denotes a recording that did not chart or was not released in that territory.

== Videos ==
Year	Release details	Comments
2002	The Videos and More: Label: Rough Trade (#030); Released: December 9, 2002; Available as a stand-alone release and as a bonus DVD with the special edition of Is This It.	Features promotional videos of the Is This It singles, and previously unaired performances on the MTV2 Special, "2$Bill".

== Music videos ==
Year	Title	Director(s)
2001	"Last Nite"	Roman Coppola
2002	"The Modern Age"	Roman Coppola
2002	"Hard to Explain"	Roman Coppola; Johannes Gamble; Julian Casablancas
2002	"Someday"	Roman Coppola
2003	"12:51"	Roman Coppola
2004	"Reptilia"	Jake Scott
2004	"The End Has No End"	Sophie Muller
2005	"Juicebox"	Mike Palmieri
2006	"Heart in a Cage"	Samuel Bayer
2006	"You Only Live Once"	Samuel Bayer
2007	"You Only Live Once" (second version)	Warren Fu
2011	"Under Cover of Darkness"	Warren Fu
2011	"Call Me Back"	Albert Hammond, Jr.
2011	"Taken for a Fool"	Laurent Briet
2013	"All the Time"	Albert Hammond, Jr.
2016	"Threat of Joy"	Warren Fu
2020	"At the Door"	Mike Burakoff
2020	"Bad Decisions"	Andrew Donoho
2020	"Ode to the Mets"	Warren Fu
2020	"The Adults Are Talking"	Roman Coppola
2026	"Going Shopping"	Johann Rashid
2026	"Lonely In the Future"	Warren Fu
