= The Adults Are Talking =

2020 single by the Strokes

Single by the Strokes

from the album The New Abnormal
- Released: November 3, 2020
- Recorded: 2019
- Studio: Shangri-La (Malibu, California)
- Genre: New wave; indie rock; post-punk
- Length: 5:09 (album version); 4:47 (single version)
- Label: RCA; Cult
- Composers: Julian Casablancas; Nikolai Fraiture; Albert Hammond Jr.; Fabrizio Moretti; Nick Valensi
- Lyricist: Julian Casablancas
- Producer: Rick Rubin

The Strokes singles chronology
"Brooklyn Bridge to Chorus" (2020)	"The Adults Are Talking" (2020)	"Going Shopping" (2026)

Music video
- "The Adults Are Talking" on YouTube

"The Adults Are Talking" is a song by American rock band the Strokes, the opening track on their sixth studio album, The New Abnormal (2020). It was released to alternative radio as the album's fourth single on November 3, 2020. It was produced by Rick Rubin with music written by all members of the Strokes and lyrics written by the band's singer, Julian Casablancas.

The Strokes performed "The Adults Are Talking" on Saturday Night Live on October 31, 2020, and a music video for the song, directed by Roman Coppola, was released on December 1. Commercially, the song reached No. 8 on the Billboard Hot Rock & Alternative Songs chart and No. 31 on the Billboard Alternative Airplay chart.

== Composition ==
"The Adults Are Talking" has been described as an indie rock and post-punk song, with new wave integrated. It has been called a "classic Strokes track" by multiple writers. Specific Strokes songs that it has been compared to include "One Way Trigger", particularly due to its usage of a drum machine and digital-sounding guitar riffs, and "Is This It", due to the sound of Julian Casablancas' vocals as well as the song's placement as the album's opener. Jon Dolan of Rolling Stone likened the drum machine beat to the one heard in Joe Jackson's 1982 song "Steppin' Out". Tyler Clark of Consequence of Sound described Fabrizio Moretti's drums as "motorik" and Nikolai Fraiture's bass guitar as "cruising". The song has dueling guitar riffs from Nick Valensi and Albert Hammond Jr. throughout, a style of playing apparent in much of the band's discography. Both Valensi and Hammond Jr. also use the pizzicato playing technique throughout. Rachel Aroesti of The Guardian made note of the multiple guitar riff styles featured in the song, saying that they range from "angular rattling to phone-dial chiming to sweetly inquiring riffs that appear to converse with one another".

The Independent's Helen Brown felt that the song was "charged with a tense ennui that proves a perfect fit for the present lockdown", referencing the lockdown put into place in the United States due to the COVID-19 pandemic. On the song, Casablancas swaps between using crooning vocals and falsetto. Similar to other songs on The New Abnormal, "The Adults Are Talking" closes with a 15-second outro of studio chatter leading into the album's following track, "Selfless".

== Release ==
The Strokes debuted "The Adults Are Talking" at a concert on May 13, 2019, at the Wiltern Theatre in Los Angeles, almost a year prior to its release in studio form. The song was also a part of their setlist during their performance at a Durham, New Hampshire, rally for then-US presidential candidate Bernie Sanders on February 10, 2020. "The Adults Are Talking" received its first release in studio form as the opening track on the Strokes' sixth studio album, The New Abnormal, released on April 10, 2020, through Cult and RCA Records. The band performed the song, as well as "Bad Decisions", during the October 31, 2020, episode of Saturday Night Live's 46th season. "The Adults Are Talking" was later released as a radio play single, impacting alternative radio stations, on November 3, 2020.

=== Music video ===
The band released a music video for the song on December 1, 2020, after releasing a teaser for it the day prior. It was directed by longtime Strokes collaborator Roman Coppola, who directed four music videos released from Is This It as well as a music video for their song "12:51" from Room on Fire (2003). The video depicts a game of baseball between the members of the Strokes and a team of highly skilled robots. For the video, the band wore custom-designed Strokes baseball uniforms. American musician Beck also makes a cameo appearance in the video as a base coach for the band. In the latter half of the video, a dramatic sequence of events ensues, beginning with Julian Casablancas being hit by a pitch. Afterward, Nikolai Fraiture hits a ball deep into the outfield, bringing Casablancas across the bases to score the band their first run of the game. The camera cuts to the stadium's scoreboard to show the band now losing 56–1 to the robots, but the band go on to celebrate the run emphatically as if they had just won the game.

== Reception ==
=== Critical response ===
The New York Times ranked "The Adults Are Talking" as the 19th best song of 2020.

Ahead of the album release, The Independent named the song the band's 20th best song. Meanwhile, in February 2023, The Guardian ranked it as the band's fifth best song, and wrote "One striking thing about The New Abnormal was how contemporary it made The Strokes sound, 22 years into their career, a point proven when its fast-paced but marvellously understated opening track went viral."

=== Chart performance ===
Commercially, the song peaked at number eight on the US Billboard Hot Rock & Alternative Songs chart.

== Personnel ==
Credits are adapted from The New Abnormal liner notes.

The Strokes

- Julian Casablancas – vocals
- Albert Hammond Jr. – guitar
- Nick Valensi – guitar
- Nikolai Fraiture – bass guitar
- Fabrizio Moretti – drums

Technical personnel

- Ben Baptie – mixing
- Jason Lader – engineering
- Stephen Marcussen – mastering
- Rick Rubin – production
- Stewart Whitmore – mastering

== Charts ==
=== Weekly charts ===
Weekly chart performance for "The Adults Are Talking"
Chart (2020–2021)	Peak position
Belgium (Ultratip Bubbling Under Flanders)	10
Canada Rock (Billboard)	49
New Zealand Hot Singles (RMNZ)	18
Portugal (AFP)	141
US Hot Rock & Alternative Songs (Billboard)	8
US Rock & Alternative Airplay (Billboard)	29

=== Year-end charts ===
Year-end chart performance for "The Adults Are Talking"
Chart (2021)	Position
US Hot Rock & Alternative Songs (Billboard)	71

== Certifications ==
Certifications for "The Adults Are Talking"
Region	Certification	Certified units/sales
France (SNEP)	Platinum	200,000^{‡}
Mexico (AMPROFON)	Diamond+Gold	330,000^{‡}
New Zealand (RMNZ)	Platinum	30,000^{‡}
Portugal (AFP)	Gold	5,000^{‡}
Spain (Promusicae)	Gold	30,000^{‡}
United Kingdom (BPI)	Platinum	600,000^{‡}
^{‡} Sales+streaming figures based on certification alone.
