= Brooklyn Bridge to Chorus =

2020 single by The Strokes

Single by The Strokes

from the album The New Abnormal
- Released: April 6, 2020
- Studio: Shangri-La (Malibu, California)
- Genre: New wave; synth-pop; post-punk; dance-rock
- Length: 3:55
- Label: RCA; Cult
- Composers: Julian Casablancas; Nikolai Fraiture; Albert Hammond Jr.; Fabrizio Moretti; Nick Valensi
- Lyricist: Julian Casablancas
- Producer: Rick Rubin

The Strokes singles chronology
"Bad Decisions" (2020)	"Brooklyn Bridge to Chorus" (2020)	"The Adults Are Talking" (2020)

Music video
- "Brooklyn Bridge to Chorus" on YouTube

"Brooklyn Bridge to Chorus" is a song by American rock band The Strokes. The song was released on April 6, 2020, as the third single from their sixth studio album, The New Abnormal (2020). The song was featured as part of the soundtrack to the sports video game MLB The Show 21.

== Personnel ==
Adapted from The Strokes official YouTube channel.

The Strokes

- Julian Casablancas – vocal, lyricist, composer
- Nikolai Fraiture – bass guitar, composer
- Albert Hammond Jr. – guitar, composer
- Nick Valensi – guitar, composer
- Fabrizio Moretti – drums, composer

Additional Personnel

- Jason Lader – engineer, mixing engineer
- Pete Min – engineer
- Rob Bisel – assistant engineer
- Dylan Neustadter – assistant engineer
- Kevin Smith – assistant engineer
- Stephen Marcussen – mastering engineer
- Stewart Whitmore – mastering engineer
- Rick Rubin – producer

== Charts ==
Chart (2020)	Peak position
Belgium (Ultratip Bubbling Under Flanders)	17
New Zealand Hot Singles (RMNZ)	24
US Hot Rock & Alternative Songs (Billboard)	7
