= At the Door =

2020 single by The Strokes

Single by The Strokes

from the album The New Abnormal
- Released: February 11, 2020
- Studio: Shangri-La (Malibu, California)
- Genre: Synth-pop; experimental pop; electronica; art pop
- Length: 5:10
- Label: RCA; Cult
- Composers: Julian Casablancas; Nikolai Fraiture; Albert Hammond Jr.; Fabrizio Moretti; Nick Valensi; Paul Vassallo
- Lyricist: Julian Casablancas
- Producer: Rick Rubin

The Strokes singles chronology
"All the Time" (2013)	"At the Door" (2020)	"Bad Decisions" (2020)

Music video
- "At the Door" on YouTube

"At the Door" is a song by American rock band The Strokes. The song was released on February 11, 2020, as the lead single from their sixth studio album, The New Abnormal (2020). An accompanying animated music video was released on the same day.

== Composition ==
"At the Door" lacks drums and percussion and primarily features Julian Casablancas' vocals accompanied by a digital guitar. It has been described as a synth-pop song by multiple writers as well as a "stark change of pace" for the band by NME's Ella Kemp. In a review for the Chicago Tribune, Mark Kennedy wrote, "Casablancas knows he is a lost soul, but offers hope: "Use me like an oar/Get yourself to shore." Caleb Campbell of Under the Radar described it as a "synth-led slow burn of a track" with a "heart wrenching vocal performance from Julian Casablancas". Writers noted Giorgio Moroder as well as Casablancas' side project The Voidz as possible influences for the song. Kemp also stated that the song includes "contemplative lyrics" that "Casablancas sings to someone we will never know".

== Music video ==
The video was done in the style of 1980s animation and tells several roughly interlinked stories. The stories are:

- The Boy - A young boy is at home while his parents watch TV when a hooded figure appears at the doorway. Subsequently, the boy's parents fight while he sits sadly in a corner, playing with a toy figure of the warrioress from the Megastructure story. The hooded figure is revealed to be Death, who takes the boy along with him on a cosmic journey where they witness the Cosmonaut 1982 story. Death embraces the boy as he cries. The boy enters a doorway to return to his home, where he finds it empty and long deserted with the implication that his parents are dead. The Boy story was drawn by a team led by Benjy Brooke.
- The Rabbits - During an eclipse of the moon, a group of rabbits flee while another rabbit turns demoniacal. One of the rabbits is trapped in a tunnel and is scarred by the demoniacal rabbit. Subsequently, the scarred rabbit is able to escape from the netting which binds him in the tunnel. The scarred rabbit joins the other rabbits, but the attack has traumatized him as he always fearfully turns around to see what is behind him. The Rabbits story was drawn by a team led by Adam Henderson.
- The Megastructure - On a mechanical planet called the Megastructure, a sinister alien called the Overlord views the Rabbit and Boy stories. A warrior woman imprisoned and tortured by the aliens breaks free of her chains and kills her tormentors. She then hijacks a flying car and goes in pursuit of the Overlord with the intention of killing him, but before she does, the Megastructure explodes, killing everyone. The Megastructure story was drawn by Pablo Gostanian and his 2Veinte studio in Buenos Aires.
- The Celestial Procession - In the depths of outer space a group of hooded aliens march on an ethereal structure before their leader, who is dressed in a style reminiscent of a Chinese empress. The empress activates a power surge, which apparently destroys the Megastructure and opens a doorway. The aliens in the procession enter the doorway and disappear with the implication that they are sacrificing their lives. The Celestial Procession story was drawn by a team led by Adam Sillard.
- Cosmonaut 1982 - In outer space, a Soviet spacecraft surrounded by debris that has an alien attached to it while the lifeless body of a cosmonaut floats outside. The spacecraft explodes, killing the alien. It is implied that the cosmonaut sacrificed his life to destroy the alien and prevent the spacecraft from returning to Earth. Afterwards, the wreckage of the spacecraft is sucked into a black hole, and the hand of the cosmonaut can be seen falling into it. The Cosmonaut 1982 story was drawn by Ugo Bienvenu and his Remembers Productions studio in Paris.

The last shot of the video is of the boy wandering his abandoned home before the video cuts away to a shot of a futuristic, edenic place as Casablancas sings about "waiting on the other side". The video's director and writer, Mike Burakoff, explains its meaning as: "There’s a feeling when you are growing up that you are just leaving for a second to go get something, that you’ll be right back. But reality is not the same as a memory, you can’t go back. Something or some time that feels so close to you can be impenetrably far away. It’s a feeling of loss that I get when I think about certain memories from my past. That notion is at the heart of this video… How do these different characters deal with loss? What does it feel like to face the future?" The video premiered at a campaign rally for 2020 presidential candidate Bernie Sanders in the New Hampshire Democratic primary. The video was inspired by films of the 1970s and 1980s such as Watership Down, The NeverEnding Story, Heavy Metal, and other films of the era.

== Personnel ==
Personnel adapted from album liner notes, except where cited.

The Strokes

- Julian Casablancas – vocal, lyricist, composer
- Nikolai Fraiture – bass guitar, composer
- Albert Hammond Jr. – guitar, composer
- Nick Valensi – digital guitar, composer
- Fabrizio Moretti – keyboards, composer

Technical personnel

- Paul Vassallo – composer
- Jason Lader – engineer, mixing engineer
- Pete Min – engineer
- Rob Bisel – assistant engineer
- Dylan Neustadter – assistant engineer
- Kevin Smith – assistant engineer
- Stephen Marcussen – mastering engineer
- Stewart Whitmore – mastering engineer
- Rick Rubin – producer

== Charts ==
Chart (2020)	Peak position
Belgium (Ultratip Bubbling Under Flanders)	44
US Hot Rock & Alternative Songs (Billboard)	18
