= Ode to the Mets =

2020 song by the Strokes

Song by the Strokes

from the album The New Abnormal
- Released: April 10, 2020
- Studio: Shangri-La (Malibu)
- Genre: Dream pop
- Length: 5:51
- Label: RCA; Cult
- Composers: Julian Casablancas; Nikolai Fraiture; Albert Hammond Jr.; Fabrizio Moretti; Nick Valensi
- Lyricist: Julian Casablancas
- Producer: Rick Rubin

Music video
- "Ode to the Mets" on YouTube

"Ode to the Mets" is a song by American rock band the Strokes. It is the closing track on their sixth studio album, The New Abnormal (2020). It was written by lead singer Julian Casablancas following the New York Mets' loss in the 2016 National League Wild Card Game at Citi Field. The title was originally a joke, but drummer Fabrizio Moretti found it a fitting metaphor for the lyrical themes, and convinced Casablancas to keep it.

The Strokes first performed the song live at their New Year's Eve 2019 concert at the Barclays Center. Multiple critics regarded "Ode to the Mets" as one of the highlights from The New Abnormal. It reached number 27 on the Billboard Hot Rock Songs chart. A music video, directed by Warren Fu, was released on July 24, 2020, coinciding with that year's delayed Opening Day for the Mets.

== Background ==
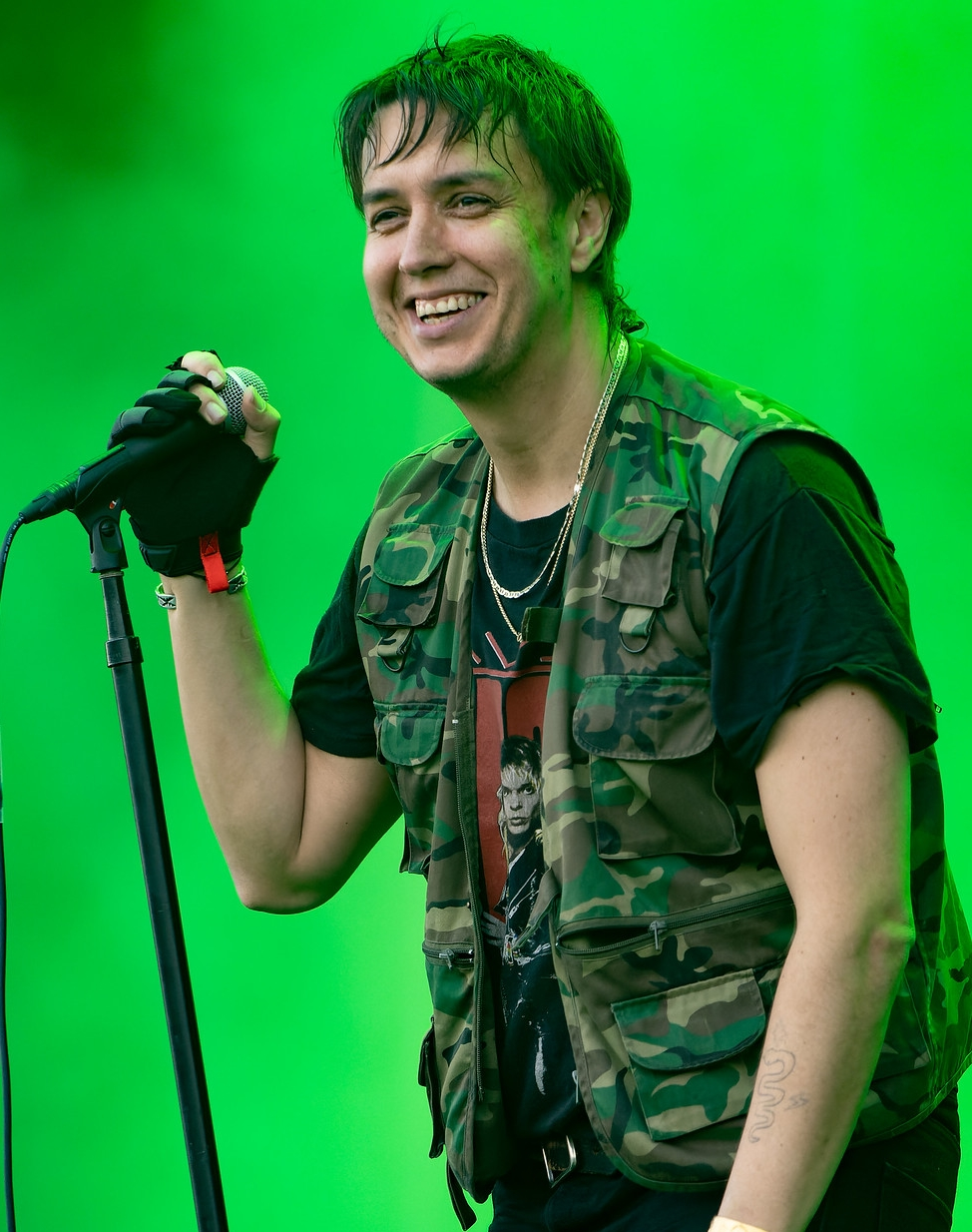
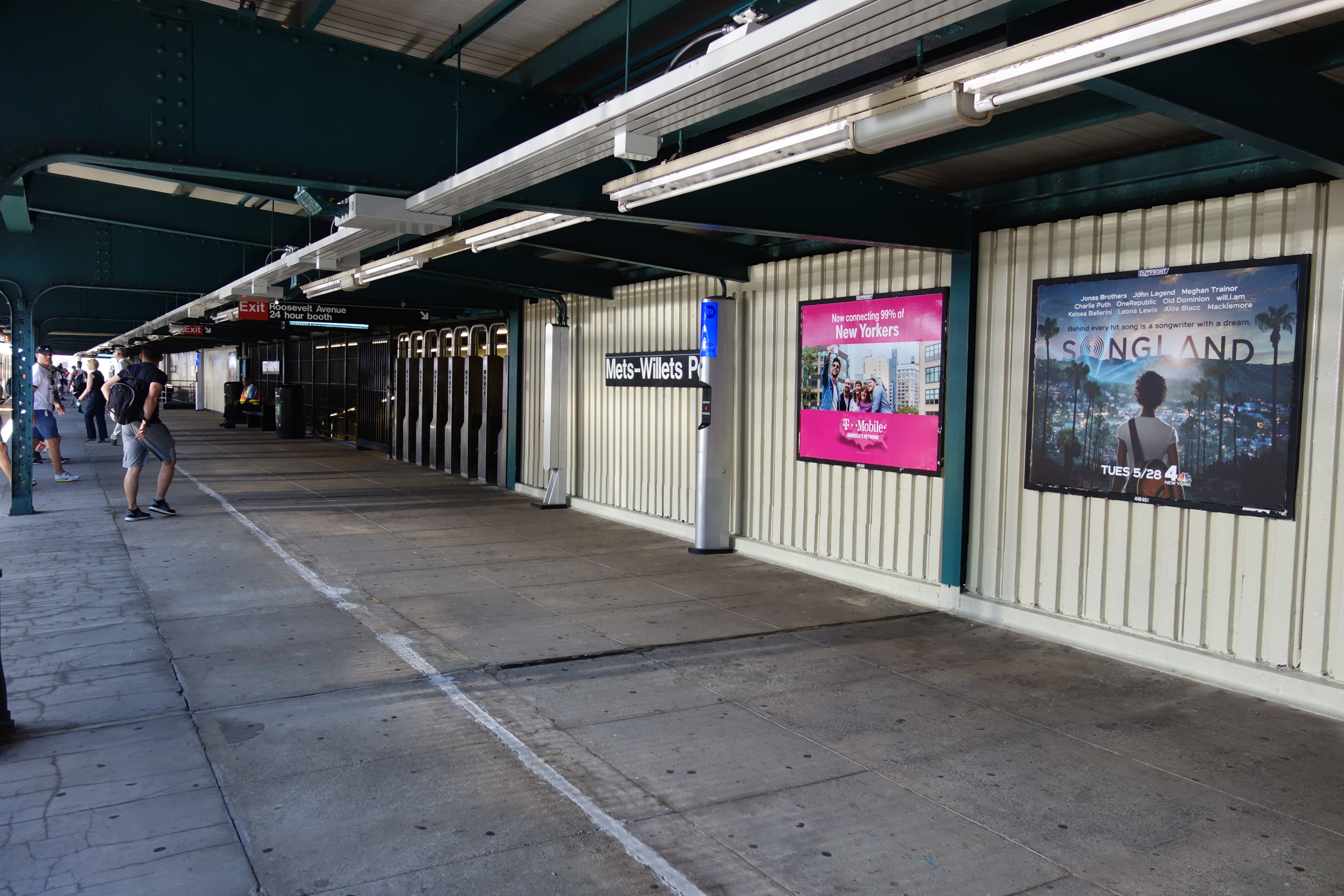
Julian Casablancas (top) began writing "Ode to the Mets" while waiting for the 7 train at Mets–Willets Point station (bottom)

Frontman Julian Casablancas began writing "Ode to the Mets" on October 5, 2016, following the 2016 National League Wild Card Game between the New York Mets and San Francisco Giants, which Casablancas had attended with Strokes guitar technician Paul Vassallo. The Mets' loss saw them knocked out of the 2016 postseason. A lifelong Mets fan, Casablancas began sketching lyrics and a melody while waiting for the 7 train at Mets–Willets Point station. As a joke, he gave it the working title "Ode to the Mets", with his original intention being to leave the song title as simply "Ode". However, drummer Fabrizio Moretti later dissuaded him from doing so, finding the title befitting of the lyrical themes. Moretti believed that both the Mets and the song evoke "something that you set your heart to and that you love unconditionally but that continues to disappoint you."

Like the rest of the songs from The New Abnormal, the band recorded the song primarily at Rick Rubin's Shangri-La studio in Malibu, California. The band performed it live for the first time during a New Year's Eve 2019 concert at the Barclays Center in Brooklyn, New York. Casablancas preceded the performance by announcing that they would have a new album releasing in 2020. "Ode to the Mets" was officially released as the ninth and final track on The New Abnormal on April 10, 2020.

== Composition ==
Atlantic City Weekly writer Ryan Loughlin categorized "Ode to the Mets" as dream pop, with others describing it as a ballad. The lyrics are unrelated to the Mets or baseball generally, with Kitty Empire of The Observer considering them difficult to decipher. Moretti believed the song was about "something that you set your heart to and you love unconditionally, but continues to disappoint you," which MLB.com writer Michael Clair felt echoed "the kind of self-deprecation Mets fans are famous for." Of this interpretation, Casablancas said, "That wasn't my intention with the song, but I can’t argue with [it]." AllMusic reviewer Heather Phares described the lyrics as "Casablancas [...] telling off someone who's already long gone", while Helen Brown of The Independent felt it saw the band "[looking] back on their lost years." During the song, Casablancas verbally counts in Moretti by requesting "drums please, Fab".

Spectrum Culture's Kevin Korber called the song as a "delicate mix of detached cool and melancholy", with Susan Hansen of Clash noting the song's progression "[building] before escalating in intensity, providing a soothing end to the blistering presentation". The song's gradual buildup and anthemic feel led Lisa Wright of The Forty-Five to compare it to Frank Sinatra's 1969 song "My Way". Casablancas' vocal delivery goes "from monotone to octave jumping". Ella Kemp of NME described the song's distinctive riff as sounding had been "put through a wind machine". Helen Brown felt that the song would serve as a fitting soundtrack for the closing credits to the upcoming documentary adaptation of Lizzy Goodman's 2017 oral history Meet Me in the Bathroom, which heavily follows the Strokes.

== Music video ==
The band released a music video for the song on July 24, 2020, to coincide with the Opening Day for the New York Mets, which had been delayed due to the COVID-19 pandemic. Inspired by the opening titles of the sitcom Cheers, the video was directed by long-time collaborator Warren Fu and features work from eight different animators. It depicts New York City throughout various points of history; chronologically, it ends in the future with the city underwater, apparently as a result of climate change, adorned with banners featuring optimistic slogans concerning a better future. It also features nods to the Mets, with the team's "Ya Gotta Believe" slogan displayed on a poster, another banner reading "Class of '69", in reference to their 1969 World Series victory and it ends with Shea Stadium under water with a sign that says “Believe In Miracles,” another Mets rally cry. A photo of the band in their early days, from Nick Valensi's private photo collection, also appears.

== Reception ==
Several reviewers regarded "Ode to the Mets" as a highlight of The New Abnormal. Variety writer A. D. Amorosi labeled it an "elegant, odd finale to a sharp-kicking album", adding that no other point on the album was "as slick and theatrical as the melancholy melody of 'Ode to The Mets'". Under the Radar's Caleb Campbell felt the song ended the album on a high note, while Kaelen Bell of Exclaim! deemed it a "solid late-career [entry]". In a mixed review of The New Abnormal, Sam Sodomsky of Pitchfork thought the song was one of the album's finer moments, calling it "genuinely pretty," and a "step in the right direction." Some reviewers were less favorable. For The Guardian, Rachel Aroesti wrote that "Ode to the Mets provides a decidedly unspectacular finale," while Jon Dolan of Rolling Stone found the song's "lachrymose lounge moan" pretentious and "over-the-top". Commercially, the song peaked at number 27 on the Billboard Hot Rock Songs chart.

Casablancas jokingly suggested that the Mets play the song over the PA system after each defeat at their home field in contrast to them playing "New York Groove" by Ace Frehley after each victory.

Billboard named the song as the fifth best rock song of 2020. In May 2020, NME ranked it as the band's tenth best song.

== Personnel ==
Credits are adapted from The New Abnormal liner notes.

The Strokes

- Julian Casablancas – vocals
- Albert Hammond Jr. – guitar
- Nick Valensi – guitar
- Nikolai Fraiture – bass
- Fabrizio Moretti – drums

Technical personnel

- Jason Lader – engineering, mixing
- Stephen Marcussen – mastering
- Rick Rubin – production
- Stewart Whitmore – mastering

== Chart performance ==
Chart performance for "Ode to the Mets"
Chart (2020)	Peak position
US Hot Rock & Alternative Songs (Billboard)	27
