= All the Time (The Strokes song) =

Single by The Strokes

from the album Comedown Machine
- B-side: "Fast Animals"
- Released: February 19, 2013
- Recorded: 2011–2012
- Genre: Indie rock; new wave; garage rock revival
- Length: 3:01
- Label: RCA
- Songwriters: Julian Casablancas; Nikolai Fraiture; Albert Hammond Jr.; Fabrizio Moretti; Nick Valensi
- Producer: Gus Oberg

The Strokes singles chronology
"One Way Trigger" (2013)	"All the Time" (2013)	"At the Door" (2020)

Music video
- "All the Time" on YouTube

"All the Time" is a song by American indie rock band the Strokes. It served as the lead single from their fifth studio album, Comedown Machine and was released as a digital download on February 19, 2013. The song was written by the whole band. The 7" was officially released on April 20, 2013 and contained "Fast Animals" as the B-side.

== Track listing ==
No.	Title	Length
1.	"All The Time"	3:01
2.	"Fast Animals"	3:43

== Music video ==
A music video for "All the Time" was released on 15, March 2013. It is a compilation of footage of the band playing live, taping music videos, and in transit on tour.

== Charts ==
Chart (2013)	Peak position
Japan Hot 100 (Billboard)	29
US Hot Rock Songs (Billboard)	47
US Alternative Airplay (Billboard)	38
