= Bad Decisions (The Strokes song) =

2020 single by the Strokes

Single by The Strokes

from the album The New Abnormal
- Released: February 18, 2020
- Studio: Shangri-La (Malibu, California)
- Genre: Indie rock; garage rock revival; new wave
- Length: 4:53
- Label: RCA; Cult
- Composers: Julian Casablancas; Nikolai Fraiture; Albert Hammond Jr.; Billy Idol; Tony James; Fabrizio Moretti; Nick Valensi
- Lyricist: Julian Casablancas
- Producer: Rick Rubin

The Strokes singles chronology
"At the Door" (2020)	"Bad Decisions" (2020)	"Brooklyn Bridge to Chorus" (2020)

Music video
- "Bad Decisions" on YouTube

"Bad Decisions" is a song by American rock band The Strokes, released on February 18, 2020, as the second single from their sixth studio album, The New Abnormal (2020). An accompanying music video was released on the same day. It incorporates elements of the song "Dancing with Myself" by British punk/new wave musician Billy Idol, who is credited as a co-writer along with his former band member Tony James.

The artwork for the song is Café Kiss by Ron Hicks.

== Live performances ==
On October 31, 2020, the band performed "Bad Decisions" on Saturday Night Live.

== Personnel ==
Adapted from the Strokes' official YouTube channel.

The Strokes

- Julian Casablancas – vocal, lyricist, composer
- Nikolai Fraiture – bass guitar, composer
- Albert Hammond Jr. – guitar, composer
- Nick Valensi – guitar, composer
- Fabrizio Moretti – drums, composer

Additional Personnel

- Billy Idol – composer
- Tony James – composer
- Jason Lader – engineer, mixing engineer
- Pete Min – engineer
- Rob Bisel – assistant engineer
- Dylan Neustadter – assistant engineer
- Kevin Smith – assistant engineer
- Stephen Marcussen – mastering engineer
- Stewart Whitmore – mastering engineer
- Rick Rubin – producer

== Charts ==
=== Weekly charts ===
Chart (2020)	Peak position
Belgium (Ultratip Bubbling Under Flanders)	23
Belgium (Ultratip Bubbling Under Wallonia)	30
Canada Rock (Billboard)	9
US Hot Rock & Alternative Songs (Billboard)	6
US Rock & Alternative Airplay (Billboard)	5

=== Year-end charts ===
Chart (2020)	Position
US Hot Rock & Alternative Songs (Billboard)	55
US Rock Airplay (Billboard)	16
