= Machinegum =

American rock band

- Origin: New York City, U.S.
- Genres: Indie rock
- Years active: 2018–present
- Labels: Frenchkiss
- Members: Erin Victoria Axtel; Martin Bonventre; Ian Devaney; Chris Egan; Steve Marion; Fabrizio Moretti
- Website: machinegummusic.com

Machinegum is an American indie rock supergroup based in New York City. The band is composed of Fabrizio Moretti (drummer of The Strokes), Ian Devaney (vocalist of Nation of Language), Steve Marion, Chris Egan, Martin Bonventre, and Erin Victoria Axtel. Formed in 2018, the band formed by performing and presenting art gallery installation, and collaborating with musicians and architects. The band released their debut studio album, Conduit in late 2019 through Frenchkiss Records.

== History ==
Formed in 2018, the band both performs and records music and presents gallery installations. The group has also collaborated with architect Joseph Vescio and actor/director Justin Bartha in the past.

The band members are known for being in several other New York-based bands. Moretti is best known as the drummer of The Strokes. Devaney is best known as the lead vocalist for Nation of Language. Marion is known for his stage name and associated music project, Delicate Steve. Egan, Bonventre, and Axtel all have independent self-titled projects in the New York metropolitan area.

Machinegum released their debut album Conduit on December 8, 2019. through Frenchkiss Records. Upon the release, the group later signed to the record label in February 2020, where the album was subsequently re-released on vinyl on July 17, 2020. The album was met with positive critic reviews.

== Discography ==
- Conduit (2019) album composed of 11 songs : Kubes, Atomized, Sugar and Vice, E.T.C, Walking Habits, 128, Deep Red, Act of Contrition, O Please, City Walls, Knots
- Kubes (2020) (single)
