= Bird on Money =

1981 painting by Jean-Michel Basquiat

Bird On Money
- Artist: Jean-Michel Basquiat
- Year: 1981
- Medium: Acrylic and oil on canvas
- Movement: Neo-expressionism
- Dimensions: 170 cm × 230 cm (66 in × 90 in)
- Owner: Rubell Family Collection

Bird on Money is a 1981 painting created by American artist Jean-Michel Basquiat. It is a tribute to jazz musician Charlie Parker, who was nicknamed "Bird." The painting was acquired in 1981 and is housed in the Rubell Family Collection. In 2020, American rock band the Strokes used the artwork as the cover for their studio album The New Abnormal.

== Analysis ==
Bird on Money was executed in 1981, the year in which he made the transition from a street artist to an established gallery artist. The painting is a tribute to jazz saxophonist Charlie Parker, a leading figure in the development of bebop. In 1985, Basquiat told The New York Times Magazine: "Since I was seventeen I thought I might be a star. I'd think about all my heroes, Charlie Parker, Jimi Hendrix… I had a romantic feeling about how these people became famous." Basquiat, like Parker, struggled with heroin addiction. He also paid homage to Parker in the paintings Charles the First (1982) and CPRKR (1982).

Jazz music was a common theme in Basquiat's art and he often painted to jazz music. Basquiat referenced jazz musicians and recordings in over thirty of his paintings, including Discography I (1983), Horn Players (1983), Arm and Hammer II (1984), and King Zulu (1986). Music journalist Tom Terrell wrote in the liner notes of the compilation album Basquiat Salutes Jazz (2005): "As Parker's bebop transcended jazz to influence musical and nonmusical pop culture worldwide, so did Basquiat's legacy impact on hip-hop and Euro-pop, Indie film and post-electric Miles jazz. Both men were absolute Zen masters of trans-cultural improvisation."

Bird on Money depicts a black and blue yardbird in reference to Parker's nickname. Parker acquired the nickname "Yardbird" early in his career, which was later shortened to "Bird." Awash in repeated symbols and arrows, the painting invokes death with the drawing of Brooklyn's Green-Wood Cemetery, where Basquiat would be laid to rest in 1988. Basquiat, whose mother was Puerto Rican, often incorporated Spanish words into his works such as "PARA MORIR" (in order to die) across from the drawing of Green-Wood Cemetery.

== See also ==
- List of paintings by Jean-Michel Basquiat
