= Charles the First (Basquiat) =

1982 painting by Jean-Michel Basquiat

- Artist: Jean-Michel Basquiat
- Year: 1982
- Medium: Acrylic and oilstick on canvas, triptych
- Movement: Neo-expressionism
- Dimensions: 198 cm × 158 cm (78 in × 62 in)
- Owner: Private collection

Charles the First is a painting created by American artist Jean-Michel Basquiat in 1982. The artwork is a tribute to jazz musician Charlie Parker, and it was the basis for rapper Jay-Z's 2010 song "Most Kingz."

== Analysis ==
Charles the First was executed in 1982, a breakout year in Basquiat's meteoric career. The painting pays homage to jazz saxophonist Charlie Parker, whose nickname was "Bird," a leading figure in the development of bebop. In 1985, Basquiat told The New York Times Magazine: "Since I was seventeen I thought I might be a star. I'd think about all my heroes, Charlie Parker, Jimi Hendrix… I had a romantic feeling about how these people became famous." Similarly, Basquiat struggled with heroin addiction like Parker and died at the age of 27 like Hendrix.

Basquiat's love of bebop fueled his art, said Eleanor Nairne, co-curator of Basquiat: Boom for Real at the Barbican Center in London. Basquiat referenced jazz musicians and recordings in over thirty of his paintings such as Bird on Money (1981), CPRKR (1982), Discography I (1983), Horn Players (1983), Arm and Hammer II (1984), and King Zulu (1986). In 2005, Prestige Records released the compilation Basquiat Salutes Jazz. Music journalist Tom Terrell wrote in the liner notes: "As Parker's bebop transcended jazz to influence musical and nonmusical pop culture worldwide, so did Basquiat's legacy impact on hip-hop and Euro-pop, Indie film and post-electric Miles jazz. Both men were absolute Zen masters of trans-cultural improvisation."

Author Jordana Moore Saggese states that "the crown motif that pervades Basquiat's work…is often interpreted as an assertion of the artist's power." In Charles the First, this crown sits in the upper left corner of the canvas, enclosed in a square above the name "THOR." Saggese also explains that the crown references hierarchies within New York's graffiti movement: "Graffiti writers who admired the work of others would express their respect for a piece by painting a simple, often three-pointed crown next to the work. Accordingly, certain artists were made "kings" (as in king of the whole subway car or king of the wall)." She provides historical context, suggesting that the crown could also refer to the notions of kingship in jazz culture and the crowning of talented performers such as Duke Ellington, Count Basie, and Nat King Cole. Basquiat's former girlfriend Suzanne Mallouk contends that the crown came from the end credits of Basquiat's favorite cartoon, The Little Rascals, which featured an etched crown above King World Productions. Saggese concluded that "Charles the First not only refers to Thor or King Charles of England, but also connects cartoons, graffiti, and jazz culture and becomes shorthand for a challenge to social, historical, and artistic hierarchies."

In conjunction with the crown, Basquiat wrote on the bottom left of the canvas "MOST YOUNG KINGS GET THEIR HEADS CUT OFF," with the word young crossed out. This phrase inspired rapper Jay-Z's song "Most Kingz." Rapper and Basquiat collector Jay-Z, who owns a print of the painting, interpreted that line in his memoir Decoded as a "statement about what happens when you achieve a certain position. You become a target. People want to take your head, your crown, your title. They want to emasculate you, make you compromise or sacrifice in a way that no man, or woman should."

== See also ==
- List of paintings by Jean-Michel Basquiat
- 1982 in art
