= The New Abnormal =

- Cover art featuring Bird on Money (1981) by Jean-Michel Basquiat.

Studio album by The Strokes
- Released: April 10, 2020
- Studios: Shangri-La (Malibu); Studio City Sound (Studio City); Mauka View (Princeville, Hawaii); Lucy's Meat Market (Eagle Rock); Groove Masters (Santa Monica); Joel and Zach's Studio (North Hollywood)
- Genres: Indie rock; new wave; post-punk revival; synth-pop; electronica
- Length: 45:07
- Labels: RCA; Cult
- Producer: Rick Rubin

The Strokes chronology
Future Present Past (2016)	The New Abnormal (2020)	Reality Awaits (2026)

Singles from The New Abnormal
- 1. "At the Door" Released: February 11, 2020; 2. "Bad Decisions" Released: February 18, 2020; 3. "Brooklyn Bridge to Chorus" Released: April 6, 2020; 4. "The Adults Are Talking" Released: November 3, 2020

The New Abnormal is the sixth studio album by American rock band the Strokes, released on April 10, 2020, through Cult and RCA Records. It was their first full-length album since Comedown Machine (2013), marking the longest gap between studio albums by the band. The album was produced by Rick Rubin and recorded at his Shangri-La studio in Malibu, California, with additional recording taking place at studios in Los Angeles County and Hawaii. The Strokes began performing songs from the album for the first time throughout 2019 before revealing the album's track list and cover art in early 2020. "At the Door", "Bad Decisions", and "Brooklyn Bridge to Chorus" were released as singles prior to the album's release, with "The Adults Are Talking" being released to radio months later.

The New Abnormal received highly positive reviews from critics, many of whom considered the album a return to form for the band. Praise was directed particularly towards the maturity of singer Julian Casablancas' lyrics, as well as the band's improved sense of musical cohesion. The album reached No. 1 in Scotland and the top ten in six other countries, including the United States and the United Kingdom. It won the Grammy Award for Best Rock Album at the 63rd Annual Grammy Awards in 2021, the band's first nomination and win.

== Background and recording ==
Writing sessions for The New Abnormal dated as far back as 2016, following the release of the band's Future Present Past EP from the same year. Guitarist Nick Valensi had told DIY that they were "slowly but surely" making progress on the album. The following year, Albert Hammond, father of guitarist Albert Hammond Jr., told The West Australian that the Strokes were working with Rick Rubin on an upcoming album. Hammond Jr. responded to this via Twitter, stating that they were only presenting musical ideas to him and were not in any recording sessions. The band would eventually begin recording sessions with Rubin at his Shangri-La studio in Malibu, California. Additional recording took place at Studio City Sound, Lucy's Meat Market, Groove Masters, and Joel and Zach's Studio, all in Los Angeles County, as well as Mauka View in Princeville, Hawaii.

On May 13, 2019, the band performed live for the first time in two years at the Wiltern Theatre in Los Angeles, premiering a new song entitled "The Adults Are Talking". The show was the first of what was dubbed a "global comeback tour". Early shows were plagued by technical difficulties ranging from sound issues to rain-outs to cancellations of entire festivals, partly due to COVID-19.

== Composition ==
Music critics have generally considered The New Abnormal to be an indie rock album. Matty Pywell of Gigwise wrote that it blended indie rock and "new wave mixed with electronica". Writing for Newsweek, James Crowley wrote that the album sonically leans more towards the "disco-tinged post-punk than the garage rock they made their name with," while Kitty Empire of The Observer labeled it as "all-out pop". Writers have also considered the album as having elements of 1980s pop music, glam rock, and dream pop. The album houses the same style of dueling guitar riffs heard on the Strokes' previous albums. Harrison Screen of Vinyl Chapters found that it also carries on the tradition of the band blending "a vintage feel into modern-day," adding that "these songs are straight from the seventies." Reviewers found that the second half of the album has a much slower pace and is more dedicated to ballads. The album also includes a series of outtakes of studio chatter interspersed throughout the album. Many lyrics on the album are thought to refer to Casablancas' divorce from his wife Juliet Joslin.

Two songs on the album incorporate vocal melodies from other songs, both of which include songwriting credits for the original performers. The chorus of "Bad Decisions" uses the vocal melody from "Dancing with Myself" (1980) by Generation X, and some of "Eternal Summer" uses the vocal melody from the chorus of "The Ghost in You" (1984) by the Psychedelic Furs.

== Packaging ==
The cover art for The New Abnormal features the 1981 painting Bird on Money by American artist Jean-Michel Basquiat. The album's title was inspired by a quote made by former California governor Jerry Brown in November 2018 in the midst of the California wildfires. Brown had responded to the emergency events being labeled "the new normal" by instead calling them "the new abnormal". The wildfires had especially impacted Malibu, the location of Rubin's Shangri-La studio at which the band were recording the album, though the studio itself was left unharmed. This chain of events influenced the band to use the quote as the title for their album. Despite the album title having been revealed in February 2020 and instead referencing Brown's quote, New York Times writer Jon Pareles noted in his review of the album that the title was a fitting description for public life during the COVID-19 pandemic. Strokes singer Julian Casablancas also noted during the pandemic that the title "feels so prescient because of the parallel between something like coronavirus".

== Promotion ==
To compensate for the cancellation of their performance at the Governors Ball Music Festival on June 2, 2019, the band played a special New Year's Eve show at Barclays Center in Brooklyn with Mac DeMarco, Kirin J Callinan and Hinds. During the show, Casablancas announced the release of a new album, stating, "We've got a new album coming out soon ... The 2010s, whatever the fuck they're called, we took 'em off. And now we've been unfrozen and we're back." The band also premiered another new song entitled "Ode to the Mets". Other notable performances included a rally for Bernie Sanders in Durham, New Hampshire on February 10, 2020, alongside Alexandria Ocasio-Cortez, Sunflower Bean, Cynthia Nixon, and Cornel West. There, Casablancas confirmed that the new album, titled The New Abnormal, would be released on April 10, while the band debuted one new song, "Bad Decisions", and screened a music video for another, "At the Door".

To further promote the record, the band released a series of self-produced videos titled and stylized as "5guys talking about things they know nothing about." The band explained that "...we wanted to see if we could connect with folks, and turned what was supposed to be a pirate radio thing for our album release (which we would make in-person) into a video chat instead..." The first episode premiered on April 8, 2020, and in the following episode, released April 9, 2020, the band previewed the entire record.

The Strokes performed "The Adults Are Talking" and "Bad Decisions" during the October 31, 2020, episode of Saturday Night Live's 46th season. "The Adults Are Talking" was released as a radio play single, impacting alternative radio stations, on November 3, 2020.

== Critical reception ==
Professional ratings
Aggregate scores
Source	Rating
AnyDecentMusic?	7.1/10
Metacritic	75/100
Review scores
Source	Rating
AllMusic	4.5/5 stars
The Daily Telegraph	3/5 stars
Entertainment Weekly	A−
Exclaim!	6/10
The Guardian	4/5 stars
The Independent	4/5 stars
NME	4/5 stars
Pitchfork	5.7/10
Rolling Stone	3.5/5 stars
The Times	5/5 stars

At Metacritic, which assigns a normalized rating out of 100 to reviews from mainstream publications, the album received a weighted average score of 75, based on 25 reviews, indicating "generally favorable reviews". Most critics praised the mature lyrics and highlighted the members' return to form after a period of tension and apathy from within the group.

Will Hodgkinson of The Times awarded the album five out of five stars, labeling it their "second masterpiece", following Is This It (2001). He praised Rick Rubin's production as well as the album's overall sound, saying that "the Strokes sound like a band again." Entertainment Weekly gave the album an A−, acknowledging that "twenty years on from the band's first flush of stardom, Abnormal offers something better than reckless youth: rock stars finally old enough to miss those good old days—and wise enough now, too, to give us the soundtrack these strange new times deserve." NME awarded the album four stars, with Ella Kemp remarking, "The Strokes have always kept their feelings at arm's length, but there are traces of deeper introspection on their sixth album, which—despite itself—is something of a crowd-pleaser."

In the review for AllMusic, Heather Phares praised the album, calling it "[f]ull of passion, commitment, and creativity" and proclaiming that "The New Abnormal marks the first time in a while that the Strokes have made truly exciting music." Giving the verdict for Consequence of Sound, Tyler Clark stated that "Even with its inevitable blemishes, The New Abnormal is easily the freshest, most interesting album that The Strokes have released in more than a decade. While the band haven't proven to be the single-handed savior that rock music always seems to be searching for, they have made the case for taking a slow-burn approach to collaboration and creativity. In that respect, this album might just be the first step along a new, more invigorated path." Rachel Aroesti also provided a positive assessment in the review for the Guardian, writing that "when they put their minds to it, that old magic is still well within the Strokes's grasp."

Some reviewers were more critical in their judgment of the album. In the review for Pitchfork, Sam Sodomsky mentioned that "the Strokes' sixth album and first in seven years, mostly just feels like a hangover. It's sluggish and slight, and the strongest hooks are so familiar that they require additional writing credits for the '80s hits they copy note-for-note". Neil McCormick of The Daily Telegraph gave the album three stars out of five, criticizing its "cheesy Eighties synths and dinky disco beats" as well as Julian Casablancas' lyrics, but praised its instrumentation and Casablancas's vocals, as well as Rick Rubin's production for making The Strokes sound "pretty damn fantastic again." Reviewing the album for Exclaim!, Kaelen Bell had mixed feelings, saying that it is "not a bad record, but it is a frustrating one, made by a band that feels pulled in a dozen different directions." Kitty Empire of the Observer also regarded the album as a "frustrating listen despite its gleam", adding that "faster tempos would have helped."

=== Commercial ===
On the US Billboard 200, The New Abnormal debuted at number 9 with 45,000 equivalent album units. Of that sum, 24,000 were in album sales, 11,000 in SEA units and less than 1,000 in TEA units. The album reached number 1 on the Top Album Sales chart, making it the highest-selling album in terms of pure sales for that week.

=== Accolades ===
Accolades for The New Abnormal
Publication	Accolade	Rank	Ref.
AllMusic	AllMusic Best of 2020	2	
Billboard	50 Best Albums of 2020 – Mid-Year	N/A	
Los Angeles Times	The 10 Best Albums of 2020	8	
NME	The 50 Best Albums of 2020	4	
Paste	25 Best Albums of 2020 – Mid-Year	25	
Uproxx	The Best Albums Of 2020	50	

Nominations and awards for The New Abnormal
Year	Ceremony	Nominated work	Recipient(s)	Category	Result
2021	Grammy Awards	The New Abnormal	The Strokes	Best Rock Album	Won

== Track listing ==
All lyrics are written by Julian Casablancas; all music is composed by the Strokes (Julian Casablancas, Nikolai Fraiture, Albert Hammond Jr., Fabrizio Moretti, Nick Valensi), with additional composers noted.

The New Abnormal track listing
No.	Title	Music	Length
1.	"The Adults Are Talking"		5:09
2.	"Selfless"		3:42
3.	"Brooklyn Bridge to Chorus"		3:55
4.	"Bad Decisions"	Billy Idol; Tony James	4:53
5.	"Eternal Summer"	Richard Lofthouse Butler; Timothy George Butler	6:15
6.	"At the Door"	Paul Vassallo	5:10
7.	"Why Are Sundays So Depressing"		4:35
8.	"Not the Same Anymore"		5:37
9.	"Ode to the Mets"		5:51
Total length:			45:07

Note

- "Bad Decisions" interpolates the melody of "Dancing with Myself", written by Billy Idol and Tony James.

== Personnel ==
Credits are adapted from the album's liner notes.

The Strokes

- Julian Casablancas – vocals
- Albert Hammond Jr. – guitars
- Nick Valensi – guitars, digital guitar on "At The Door"
- Nikolai Fraiture – bass guitar
- Fabrizio Moretti – drums, keyboards on "At The Door"

Artwork

- Jean-Michel Basquiat – cover painting (Bird on Money, 1981)
- Tina Ibañez – art direction, design
- Jason McDonald – photography

Technical personnel

- Rick Rubin – production
- Jason Lader – engineering, mixing (tracks 4–7, 9)
- Pete Min – additional engineering
- Rob Bisel – assistant engineering
- Dylan Neustadter – assistant engineering
- Kevin Smith – assistant engineering
- Gus Oberg – pre-production demo recordings and engineering
- Chris Tabron – additional pre-production recordings and engineering
- Ben Baptie – mixing (tracks 1–3, 8)
- Stephen Marcussen – mastering
- Stewart Whitmore – mastering

== Charts ==
=== Weekly charts ===
Weekly chart performance for The New Abnormal
Chart (2020)	Peak position
Australian Albums (ARIA)	21
Austrian Albums (Ö3 Austria)	8
Belgian Albums (Ultratop Flanders)	7
Belgian Albums (Ultratop Wallonia)	18
Canadian Albums (Billboard)	21
Dutch Albums (Album Top 100)	38
French Albums (SNEP)	20
German Albums (Offizielle Top 100)	12
Hungarian Albums (MAHASZ)	34
Irish Albums (Official Charts)	12
Italian Albums (FIMI)	26
Japanese Albums (Oricon)	16
New Zealand Albums (RMNZ)	15
Portuguese Albums (AFP)	2
Scottish Albums (Official Charts)	1
Swedish Albums (Sverigetopplistan)	31
Swiss Albums (Schweizer Hitparade)	5
UK Albums (Official Charts)	3
US Billboard 200	8
US Top Album Sales (Billboard)	1
US Top Alternative Albums (Billboard)	1
US Top Rock Albums (Billboard)	1

Chart (2026)	Peak position
Portuguese Streaming Albums (AFP)	169

=== Year-end charts ===
Year-end chart performance for The New Abnormal
Chart (2020)	Position
Belgian Albums (Ultratop Flanders)	167
US Top Rock Albums (Billboard)	73

== Certifications ==
Certifications for The New Abnormal
Region	Certification	Certified units/sales
France (SNEP)	Gold	50,000^{‡}
Italy (FIMI)	Gold	25,000^{‡}
Mexico (AMPROFON)	Platinum+Gold	90,000^{‡}
New Zealand (RMNZ)	Gold	7,500^{‡}
United Kingdom (BPI)	Gold	100,000^{‡}
^{‡} Sales+streaming figures based on certification alone.
