= The Strokes =

American indie rock band

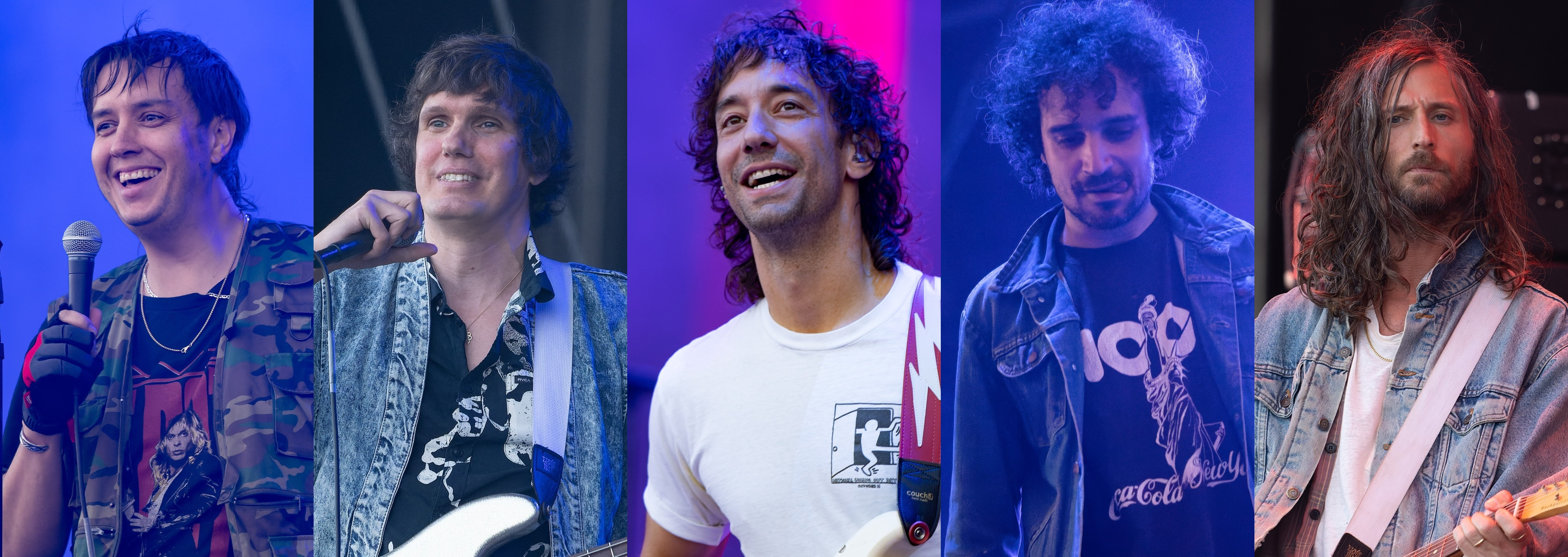
- The Strokes performing in Berlin in 2022. Left to right: Julian Casablancas, Nikolai Fraiture, Albert Hammond Jr., Fabrizio Moretti, and Nick Valensi.

Background information
- Origin: New York City, New York, U.S.
- Genres: Indie rock; garage rock revival; post-punk revival; new wave; synth-pop
- Works: Discography
- Years active: 1998–present
- Labels: Cult; RCA; Rough Trade
- Spinoffs: The Voidz
- Awards: Full list
- Members: Julian Casablancas; Nikolai Fraiture; Fabrizio Moretti; Nick Valensi; Albert Hammond Jr.
- Website: thestrokes.com

The Strokes is an American rock band from New York City that formed in 1998. It has maintained the same lineup since inception: lead vocalist and primary songwriter Julian Casablancas; guitarists Nick Valensi and Albert Hammond Jr.; bassist Nikolai Fraiture; and drummer Fabrizio Moretti. They were a leading group of the early-2000s garage rock revival and post-punk revival movements.

The release of their debut EP The Modern Age in early 2001 sparked a bidding war among major labels, with the band eventually signing to RCA Records. That summer, they released their debut album, Is This It, to widespread critical acclaim and strong sales. It has since appeared on numerous "greatest albums" lists. It was followed by Room on Fire (2003) and First Impressions of Earth (2005), both of which sold well but failed to match Is This It in immediate critical success, despite generally positive reviews.

Following a five-year hiatus, they released Angles (2011) and Comedown Machine (2013) to generally positive receptions but dwindling sales. Following the end of their initial contract with RCA, they released the Future Present Past EP (2016) through Casablancas' label Cult. The band were relatively inactive throughout the rest of the decade, making infrequent live appearances and directing most media attention to individual projects.

In 2020, they released their first studio album in seven years, The New Abnormal, produced by Rick Rubin and released through Cult and RCA. The album received highly positive reviews and was considered a return to form by critics. It went on to win Best Rock Album at the 63rd Annual Grammy Awards.

The band's seventh album, Reality Awaits, was released on July 24, 2026.

== History ==
=== 1998–2001: Formation and The Modern Age EP ===
Lead singer-songwriter Julian Casablancas, guitarist Nick Valensi, and drummer Fabrizio Moretti started playing together as teenagers while all of them were attending Dwight School in Manhattan, and formed an informal band in 1997. They later added bassist Nikolai Fraiture to their ranks, a close childhood friend of Casablancas who had attended the Lycée Français de New York with him. At the end of 1998, the group invited guitarist Albert Hammond, Jr. to play with them. He had just moved to New York City and reconnected with Casablancas, whom he knew from their brief stints at the private boarding school Institut Le Rosey, near Nyon, Switzerland. At this point, he was the last member to join the band. The two soon became roommates not long after reconnecting, with Hammond remarking that "two weeks later, we were sharing a flat."

In the following two years, the band practiced and performed tirelessly in New York City. Many of their contemporaries have credited the band's earliest successes to their dedication and hustle, as well as their engaging personalities. They practiced most nights, with many rehearsals taking place in The Music Building in Midtown Manhattan. They played their first show as the Strokes on September 14, 1999, at The Spiral. They soon frequented Manhattan's rock clubs including HiFi Bar and the Luna Lounge on the Lower East Side of New York, and later Manhattan's popular Mercury Lounge. A young booker for the Mercury Lounge, Ryan Gentles, eventually quit his job to become the band's manager.

The band began rehearsing a 14-song set (an early blueprint of the Strokes' 2001 debut, Is This It), including "Alone, Together", "Barely Legal", "Last Nite", "The Modern Age", "New York City Cops", "Soma", "Someday", "Take It or Leave It", and "This Life" (an early version of "Trying Your Luck"). Most of these songs now feature different lyrics. The band connected with producer Gordon Raphael in 2000 following a show at Luna Lounge and made a demo, The Modern Age EP, with him. The band sent the demo to the newly reformed Rough Trade Records in the UK, sparking interest there, and leading to their first release (via the website of the UK magazine, NME, who gave away a free MP3 download of "Last Nite" a week prior to the physical release as part of The Modern Age EP in 2001). The EP sparked a bidding war among record labels, the largest for a rock band in years. In August 2001, the Strokes made their first appearance on the cover of the publication The Fader in its ninth issue.

=== 2001–2002: Is This It ===
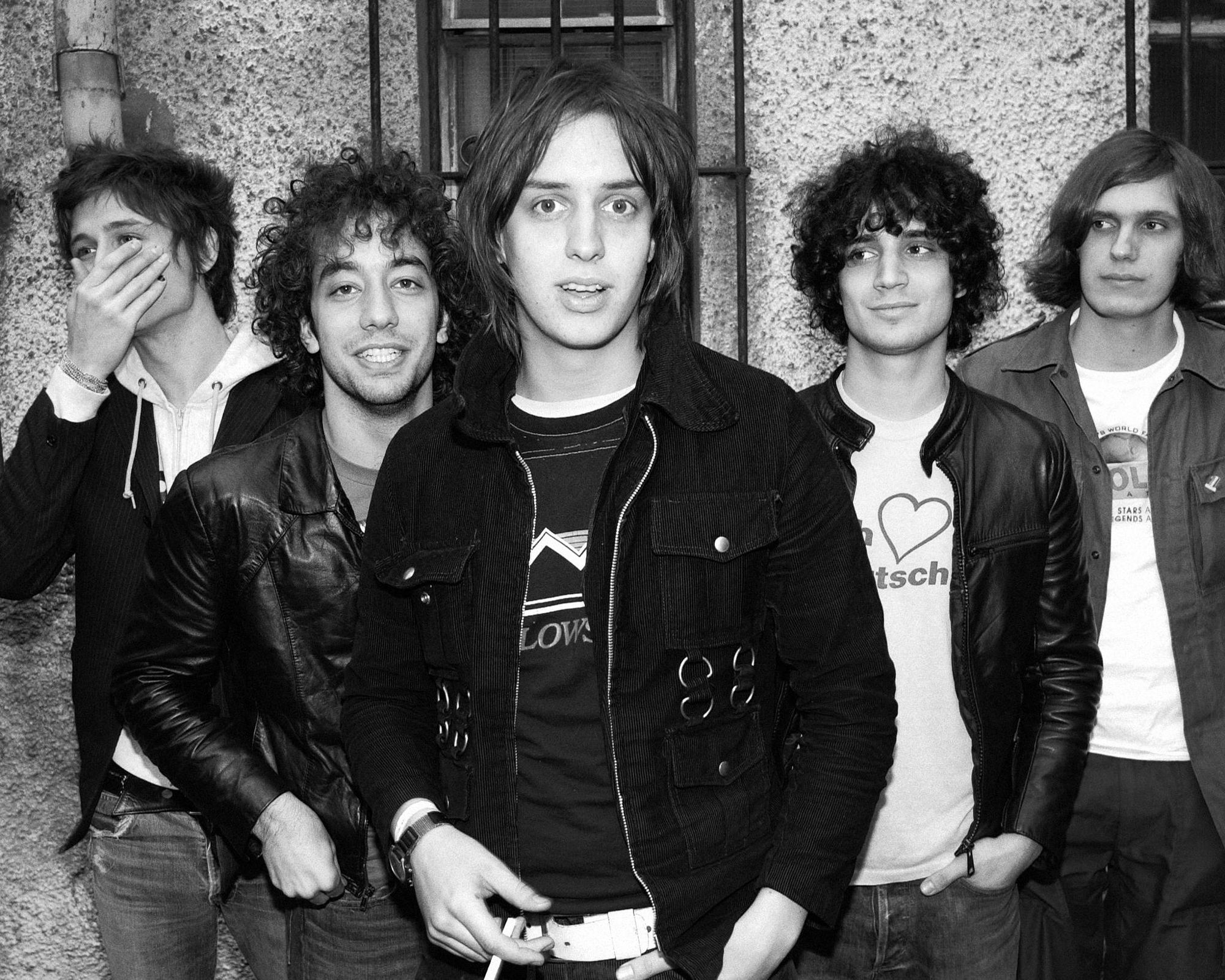
The Strokes in 2002

The Strokes released their debut album, Is This It, in Australia in July 2001, and in Japan and the UK in August 2001 before the release of a subsequent US version in October 2001. The Australia, Japan and UK dates coincided with promotional tours in the respective countries. These included the Reading and Leeds Festivals at which the band were moved up the billing twice due to rapidly growing interest, shifted from being due to play on a tented stage to a slot on the main stage, that attracted their largest audiences up to this point.

The album was produced by Gordon Raphael, as was their follow-up album Room On Fire. RCA Records delayed the North American (US) release over concerns with the album's cover and lyrics. The internationally released cover features a black-and-white photo of a gloved hand on a woman's naked backside, shown in semi-profile (photographer Colin Lane's then-girlfriend) while the North American version replaced it with a photo of particle collisions in the Big European Bubble Chamber. RCA replaced the track "New York City Cops" with "When It Started", as the former featured potentially inflammatory lyrics in the wake of the September 11 attacks. The track "New York City Cops"—featuring the refrain, "New York City Cops, they ain't too smart"—was listed as No. 12 on New York magazine's "Ultimate New York Playlist" on March 1, 2010. Despite its delayed release (and the potential controversy), Is This It received critical acclaim—among other accolades, four stars from Rolling Stone, and a 9.1 from Pitchfork Media. The album made many critics' top-ten lists, was named the best album of the year by Entertainment Weekly and Time, and (in an article previewing summer concerts) NME urged readers to attend The Strokes' shows—as they were touring some of the "best pop songs ever". While critics noted the influence of CBGB stalwarts Television, Casablancas and bandmates said they had never heard the band, instead citing the Velvet Underground and the Doors as reference points.

After the release of Is This It, the band toured around the world—including Japan, Australia, New Zealand, Europe, and North America (the band opened for the Rolling Stones on numerous occasions during the North American leg of their tour). The self-made mini-documentary "In Transit" was filmed during the summer tour of Europe. In August 2002, the band headlined the UK's Carling Weekend festivals for the second time, subsequently playing at New York's Radio City Music Hall on a bill with the White Stripes. Jack White joined The Strokes on stage to perform the guitar solo on "New York City Cops". During that period, the band also appeared as musical guests on numerous late-night talk shows. Is This It yielded several singles and music videos, all of which were directed by Roman Coppola.

Is This It has had an enduring impact on fans and critics alike. In 2009, NME named Is This It as the Greatest Album of the Decade (2000s). The album placed second on a similar list compiled by Rolling Stone (the same issue featured a list of the '100 Best Songs of the 00s', featuring "Hard to Explain" and "Last Nite" at Nos. 59 and 16, respectively). In January 2011, Rolling Stone surveyed their Facebook fans to determine the top ten debut albums of all time. Is This It came in at number ten and was also the most recent behind Pearl Jam's 1991 debut.

=== 2003–2004: Room on Fire ===
The group began recording their follow-up in 2002 with producer Nigel Godrich (best known for his work with Radiohead), but later split with him in favor of Gordon Raphael, the producer of Is This It. Recordings with Godrich were never revealed. In August 2003, the band toured Japan, playing a couple of the upcoming songs: "Reptilia", "Meet Me in the Bathroom", "The Way It Is", "Between Love & Hate" (formerly known as "Ze Newie") and "12:51" (formerly known as "Supernova"). The band also played Paul Anka's "My Way" with Japanese lyrics. The Strokes released their second album Room on Fire in October 2003. It received praise from critics but was less commercially successful, although it still went gold. The album's sound maintained The Strokes' familiar reference points, while also evoking groups such as the Cars, Bob Marley, and Blondie. In the process, they made the cover of Spin Magazine for the second time, with each member receiving his own cover. They also made the cover of Rolling Stone for the first time. Additional media coverage of the band came from the relationship between Moretti and actress Drew Barrymore, which ended in January 2007. The first single taken from Room on Fire was the song "12:51", which used distinct keyboard-like sounds produced by Valensi's guitar. The video was also directed by Roman Coppola, and was inspired by the futuristic look of the 1980s film Tron. This consisted of a mainly black scene, with instances of glowing picton blue and riptide.

In November 2003, The Strokes played on Late Night with Conan O'Brien, performing "Reptilia", "What Ever Happened", "Under Control" and "I Can't Win". During the 2003–2004 "Room on Fire Tour", the band were supported by Kings of Leon and Regina Spektor. While on tour, Spektor and The Strokes recorded the song "Modern Girls & Old Fashion Men", released as a B-side on the "Reptilia" single. Also during the tour, the band included the Clash's "Clampdown" as a cover, which was released as the B-side for "The End Has No End".

In late 2004, The Strokes revealed plans to release a live album. The Live in London LP was planned for release in October 2004, but was abandoned, reportedly due to recording quality problems. The chosen gig was one held at the legendary Alexandra Palace in North London.

=== 2005–2007: First Impressions of Earth and hiatus ===
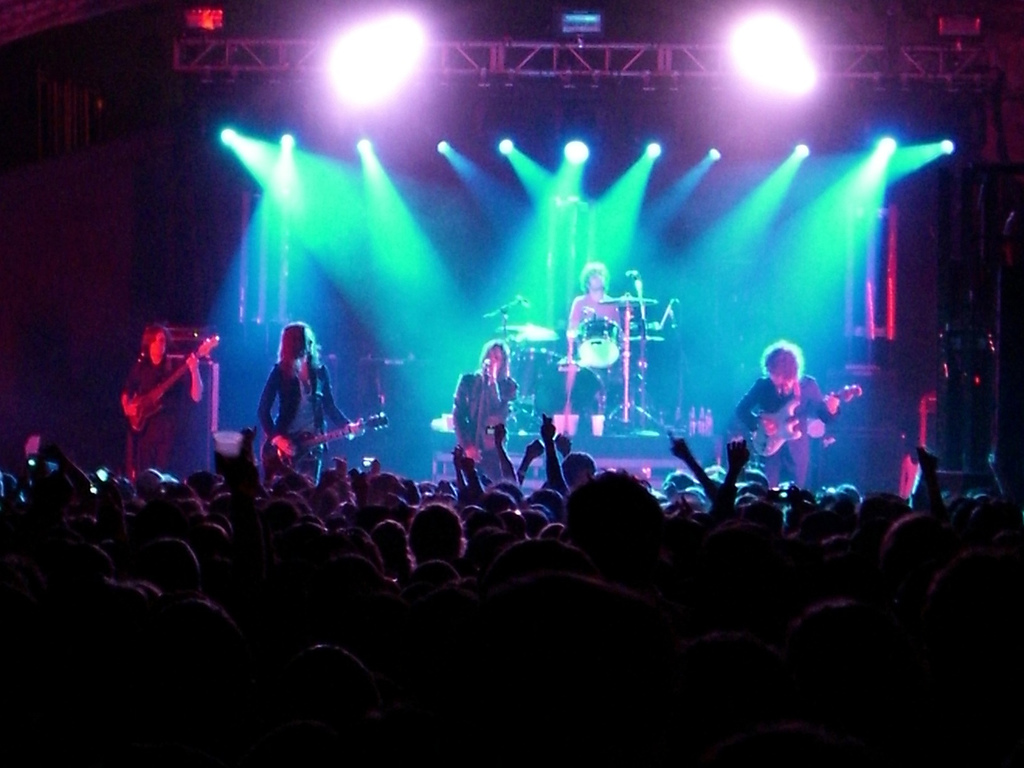
The Strokes in concert, 2006

In late September 2005, "Juicebox", the first single from The Strokes' then unreleased third album, was leaked online, forcing the single's release date to be advanced. The single was then released as an exclusive on online download services. "Juicebox" became The Strokes' second UK Top 10 hit, as well as their second US Modern Rock Top 10 success. During November and December 2005 The Strokes did a promotional tour for the still unreleased album, which involved doing one-off shows in major cities around the world. Their third album, First Impressions of Earth, was released on January 3, 2006. It received mixed reviews and debuted at number four in the U.S. and number one in the UK, the latter being a first for the band. In Japan, it went gold within the first week of release. It was also the most downloaded album for two weeks on iTunes. Fraiture claimed that the album was "like a scientific breakthrough". In January 2006, the band then made their second appearance on Saturday Night Live playing "Juicebox" and "You Only Live Once". The album was somewhat a departure from the band's two previous albums. One reason for this was a switch of producers from Gordon Raphael to David Kahne. Despite its initial strong sales, First Impressions of Earth received the worst reception, both commercially and critically, of all their albums.

In 2006, the band played eighteen sold-out shows during their UK tour. In February 2006, The Strokes won "Best International Band" at the NME Awards. In March, the band returned to the U.S. with their longest tour yet. The second single off First Impressions of Earth, "Heart in a Cage", was released in March 2006. During the summer of 2006, The Strokes played several festival dates in Europe, including the Hultsfred Festival in Sweden, Roskilde Festival in Denmark, the Oxegen Festival in Ireland, the Montreux Jazz Festival in Switzerland, the Festival Internacional de Benicàssim in Spain, the Fuji Rock Festival in Japan, and headlined the Pentaport Rock Festival in South Korea. They then toured Australia and Mexico in late August and early September, followed by the second leg of the United States tour. While in the U.S., The Strokes opened for Tom Petty & the Heartbreakers for five shows during their Highway Companion tour. The Strokes went on to complete another US tour. During this final tour, Casablancas stated to fans that the band would be taking an extensive break after it finished. An e-mail was sent out soon afterwards by Strokes manager Ryan Gentles, confirming that "much needed break". A new band website went online in May 2007 along with the release of an alternate video to their single "You Only Live Once" directed by Warren Fu. The video also featured a brief interlude with "Ize of the World", also from First Impressions of Earth. The song "You Talk Way Too Much" was used in a commercial for the Ford Sync. Aleksandra Cisneros became The Strokes' assistant manager in late 2007.

=== 2009–2011: Angles ===
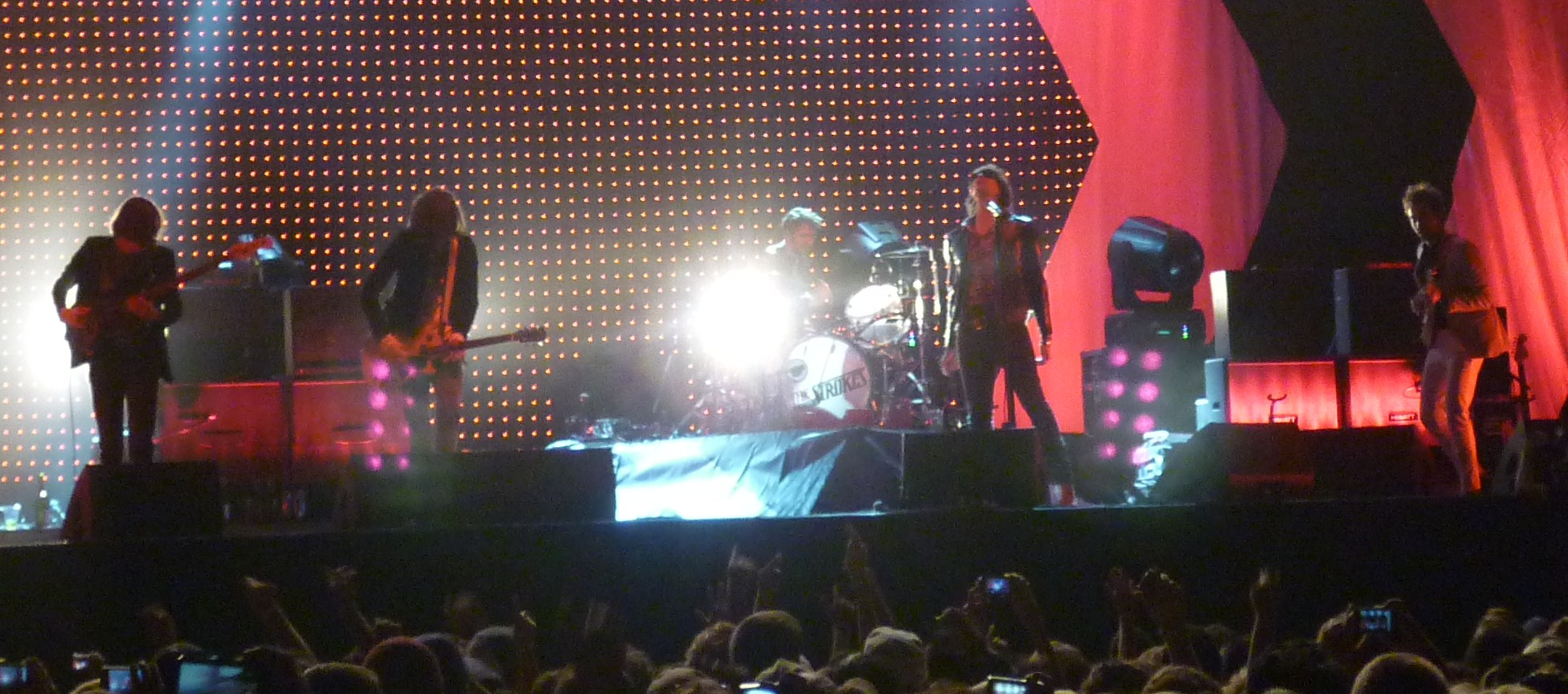
The Strokes at Austin City Limits Festival in 2010

The Strokes frontman Julian Casablancas and guitarist Nick Valensi started writing material for the album in January 2009, intent on entering the studio that February. Julian commented in Rolling Stone that they had completed about three songs that sounded like a mixture of 1970s rock and "music from the future". On March 31, 2009, the band made an announcement from their MySpace account that announced the end of their "much needed hibernation period" and the commencement of new writing and rehearsing for a fourth full-length album, entitled Angles. This album would be different from the first three due to the fact that the music for the album would also be written by the other four Strokes, rather than Casablancas writing a majority share of the material once again: "It's supercollaborative, and it sounds different," said Valensi, "but it has a Strokes vibe to it." In an NME article, Pharrell Williams expressed interest in producing this upcoming album. This followed the news that Casablancas had collaborated with both Williams and Santigold on "My Drive Thru", a track commemorating the 100th anniversary of Converse's Chuck Taylor All-Stars shoe. The song was available as a free download from the official Converse website. The album was due to be released in late 2009, but disagreements about just how ready the songs were to be released forced The Strokes to move the actual release date back. On February 1, 2010, The Strokes announced on their website that the recording of the fourth album was being helmed by producer Joe Chiccarelli. According to Chiccarelli in an interview with HitQuarters, the two parties first met in 2009 and, after finding they shared a similar mind space and similar thoughts on the potential direction of the new record, tried out some tracking. Not long after recording began, however, the band became frustrated with Chiccarelli's reserved production style. Only one song from these recording sessions, "Life Is Simple in the Moonlight", remained on the album's track listing. Inspired, in part, by other contemporary bands like MGMT, Arctic Monkeys, and Crystal Castles, The Strokes decided to experiment with various production techniques, and recorded the rest of the album's material at Albert Hammond Jr.'s home studio in upstate New York with engineer Gus Oberg.

The Strokes confirmed that they would be headlining the Isle of Wight Festival, Lollapalooza, Roskilde Festival, Hurricane Festival, Splendour in the Grass, Rockness, Outside Lands Music and Arts Festival, On The Bright Side, and Austin City Limits Music Festival in 2010. Additionally, The Strokes were announced as the 2011 headliner for the Coachella Valley Music and Arts Festival and the New Orleans Jazz & Heritage Festival in May, Festival Internacional de Benicàssim, Oxegen, Paléo, Peace & Love and Super Bock Super Rock in July, and Reading Festival and Summer Sonic in August. They were also sub-headliners to Pulp at Leeds Festival during the bank holiday weekend in August. On June 9, 2010, at Dingwalls London, England, the band played a secret show under the name 'Venison' to a crowd of just 487. This was their first live gig since October 2006. The band did not play any new material.

The lead single from the new album, "Under Cover of Darkness", was released on February 9, 2011. The 7" was officially released on March 1, 2011, and contained another track from Angles, "You're So Right", as the B-side, followed by the album on March 18, 2011. In mid-March 2011, an interview with ShortList magazine revealed that The Strokes had already begun working on their fifth studio album. However, sessions were delayed due to the mixing process of Angles. Julian Casablancas and Nick Valensi both confirmed that there was material in the works as well as plenty of leftover material. Frontman Julian Casablancas claimed that the band was eager to begin working on new material and were already supposed to, but it took longer than expected to master Angles. "Taken for a Fool" was confirmed as the second single, which was sent to U.S. radio on May 24, 2011. On June 9, The Strokes announced that a music video for "Taken For a Fool" was in the works, and that it would be directed by Laurent Briet. They revealed that the music video should be finished by the end of the month. The Strokes put out the music video for "Taken For a Fool" on July 8, 2011.

=== 2012−2015: Comedown Machine ===
In April 2012, bassist Nikolai Fraiture posted a tweet announcing that the band was heading into the studio to work on some new ideas. The Strokes later revealed that they were planning to record a new album as soon as possible. Fraiture added that the band would record their fifth album in the same manner as they put together Angles, with each member bringing in his own ideas and putting them together in the studio. On January 17, 2013, Seattle alternative radio station 107.7 The End posted on their Facebook page that they were previewing a new song by The Strokes entitled "All the Time". It was later confirmed that "All the Time" would be the lead single from the untitled fifth album. On January 25, 2013, the song "One Way Trigger" was published on their official website, and made available for free download. The song was initially met with a mixed reaction from fans of the band. On January 28, a Reddit user discovered what he correctly assumed to be the new album cover within the subpages of the band's official website, which led to a widespread rumor that the new album would be titled Comedown Machine. On January 30, the title for the fifth album was revealed to be Comedown Machine, set to be released on March 26 in the U.S. and March 25 in the UK. On February 13, 2013, the first single from the band's fifth album premiered on the radio, named "All the Time". The single was released for download on February 19, and was described as a return to the classic Strokes sound of first albums Is This It and Room on Fire. The album was released on March 25, 2013, in the UK and March 26 in the United States. The band decided to pull a media blackout with the album: no promotion in the form of TV appearances, interviews, photos, shows, or tours. On October 15, 2013, the band revealed that they were looking to "return to the scene" in 2014.

In May 2014, The Strokes performed their first U.S. show in three years at the Capitol Theatre in Port Chester, New York, performing songs from Comedown Machine for the first time. The band played at three other shows in 2014, including two headlining slots at Governors Ball Music Festival in New York City and FYF Fest in Los Angeles. On November 12, 2014, it was announced the band would headline Primavera Sound in 2015 for the festival's 15th anniversary. On March 2, 2015, the band announced their second 2015 European festival headline appearance would be at London's annual British Summer Time: Hyde Park festival on June 18, 2015, the band's first London show in five years. The announcement takes the band's number of appearances slated for 2015 up to six, with them also playing Big Guava Music Festival in Tampa, Florida, Shaky Knees Festival in Atlanta, Georgia, Landmark Festival in Washington, D.C., and Austin City Limits in Austin, Texas, as well as the previously announced Primavera Sound 15th Anniversary. During their performance at Landmark Music Festival lead singer Julian Casablancas stated that the band was back in the studio working on a follow-up to their 2013 album Comedown Machine. In late 2015, The Strokes announced another date; at Monterrey, Mexico, during the festivities of the newborn festival Live Out.

=== 2016–2018: Future Present Past EP ===
The Strokes played their first show of 2016 at Samsung's Galaxy Life Fest in Austin, Texas. On May 24, 2016, The Strokes announced another New York show on May 31 at the Capitol Theatre. On May 26, 2016, Julian Casablancas premiered "OBLIVIUS" on the debut of his monthly radio show Culture Void on Sirius XMU. Cult Records announced the release of Future Present Past, a four-song EP by The Strokes, in addition to the exclusive signing of the band to its roster. The EP includes three original songs ("Drag Queen", "OBLIVIUS", and "Threat of Joy"), along with an additional remix of "OBLIVIUS" by drummer, Fab Moretti. The EP was released on June 3, in both digital and physical formats to coincide with the band's headlining performance at Governors Ball Music Festival in New York City. "Future Present Past" was recorded over the past year in Austin and New York with the help of producer, Gus Oberg.

The band played at the Splendour in the Grass festival in Byron Bay, New South Wales, Australia on July 22, 2016. They followed this performance with the inaugural City of Angels Benefit concert in Los Angeles to support charities such as Waste Not Want Not Now, the Center in Hollywood, and the Downtown's Women's Center on July 25, 2016.

The band performed a series of festival dates taking place throughout early 2017. Festival dates include performances in Estéreo Picnic Festival as well as Lollapalooza Brasil, Lollapalooza Chile, and Lollapalooza Argentina. The band's first live performance of the year took place headlining the Estéreo Picnic Festival. The crowd in attendance of their Argentina show was reportedly 90,000 people. After the Lollapalooza Argentina show, it was revealed that their headlining slot at the festival was, to this day, their "biggest show ever" by Fraiture on social media.

=== 2019–2022: The New Abnormal ===
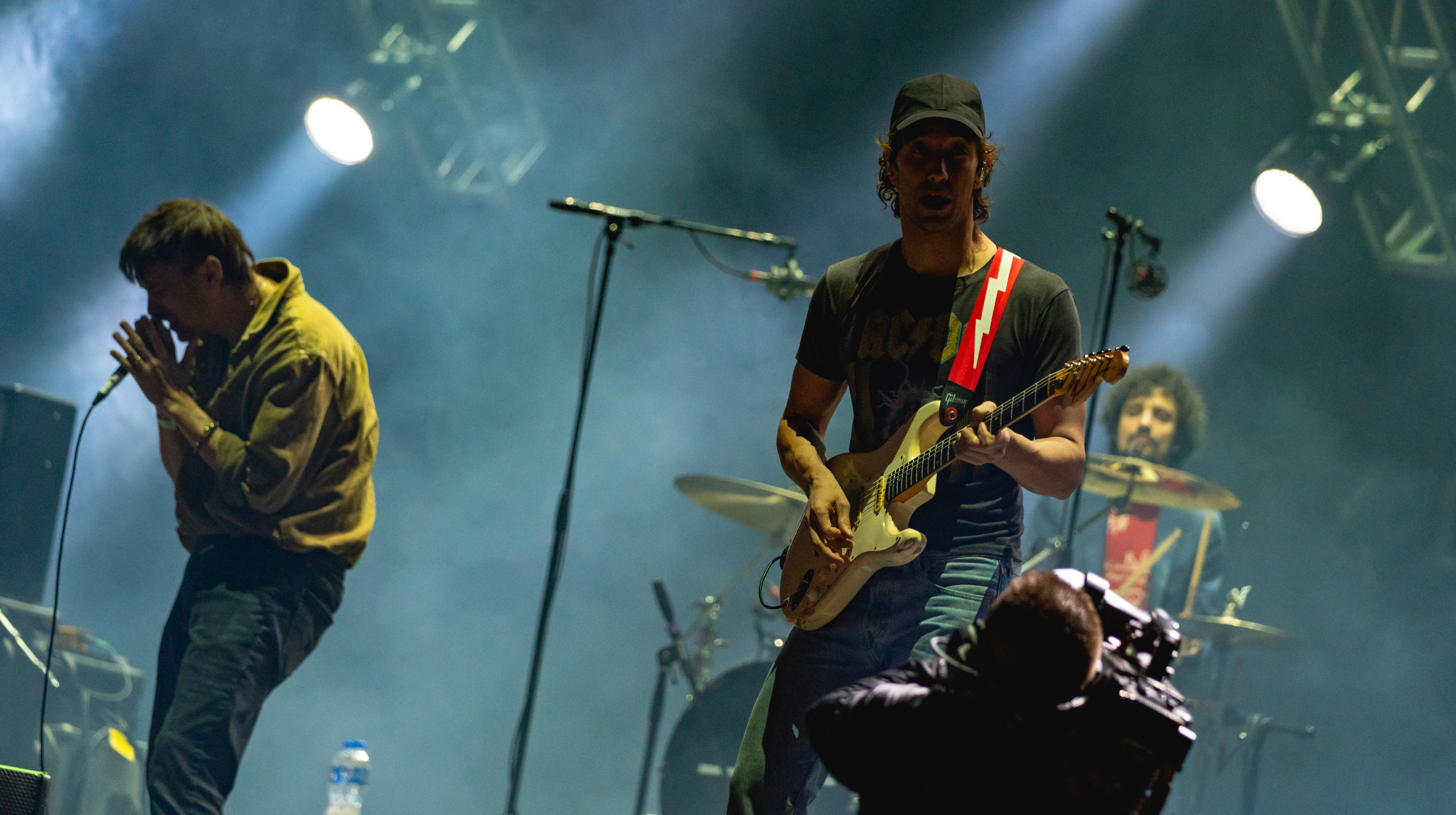
The Strokes performing at Corona Capital, 2019

In October 2016, guitarist Valensi indicated that the band were "slowly but surely working on an album, we're kind of just in writing sessions". In July 2017 Albert Hammond Sr. said The Strokes are working with Rick Rubin. Albert Hammond Jr. took to Twitter to clarify that "we met and played a few music ideas for Rick to feel out a vibe but even a theoretical album plan would be years away, if at all". He also tweeted, "Sorry everyone we are not in the studio recording" and that there were "a lot of unknowns and nothing worth speaking about at this time."

In May 2019, the band performed for the first time in over two years at a benefit show in Los Angeles. At this venue, the band debuted a new song entitled "The Adults Are Talking". The show kicked off the band's "global comeback" tour. However, this tour was met with many obstacles early on, from sound issues to rained-out shows to entire festivals being cancelled. During the band's 2019 New Year's Eve show in Brooklyn, Casablancas announced that the band's sixth studio album would be released sometime in 2020. At the show, they also debuted a new song, titled "Ode to the Mets".

On February 10, 2020, the band performed at a rally for presidential candidate Bernie Sanders at the University of New Hampshire. At this performance, Casablancas formally announced the band's sixth studio album and that the title would be The New Abnormal. He confirmed the release date of the album to be April 10 of that year. The band reportedly played two new songs at this show. On February 11, the band released a new song, "At the Door", the first single off of their sixth studio album. Two more singles followed, "Bad Decisions", and "Brooklyn Bridge to Chorus". Their sixth studio album, The New Abnormal, was released worldwide on April 10, 2020. On October 24, the band was confirmed for their fourth appearance as the musical guest for the October 31 episode of Saturday Night Live with John Mulaney hosting, where they performed "The Adults are Talking" and "Bad Decisions" from The New Abnormal.

On June 21, 2021, the band shared a video in support of New York City mayoral candidate Maya Wiley featuring a clip of a new song "Starting Again" co-written with Gregg Alexander, (which would later become "Going to Babble On", the fifth track on their next album Reality Awaits). Throughout 2022, the band were as present as ever in touring, including headlining at Lollapalooza dates in Brazil, Chile, and Argentina, as well as other high-profile music festivals in Europe. On June 17, 2022, the band performed a benefit concert in support of Chicago-based congressional candidate Kina Collins. That summer, they toured as an opening act on the Red Hot Chili Peppers 2022 Global Stadium Tour. The band continued touring in 2023 with the Red Hot Chili Peppers as well as headlining festivals in the United States, Europe, and Asia. One of those festivals was the first Indian edition of Lollapalooza in Mumbai.

=== 2022–present: Reality Awaits ===
In October 2022, Rick Rubin revealed he had been recording a new album with The Strokes in Costa Rica. On February 24, 2023, the band released The Singles – Volume 1, a vinyl box set containing 10 7" singles of material from the band's first three albums, as well as B-sides, demos, and rarities.

On March 8, 2024, the band performed their second benefit concert in support of Kina Collins' third congressional bid. In the fall of 2025, the band commenced a short tour, including headlining both weekends at the Austin City Limits Music Festival in Austin, Texas. The band also headlined the Harvest Rock Music Festival in Adelaide, South Australia that October, which marked their first Australian show in over three years as well as their first show in Adelaide specifically since 2006.

On April 6, 2026, it was announced that their seventh album, Reality Awaits, would be released on June 26, 2026. They released the lead single "Going Shopping" on the same day. Later that month, the band performed at the Coachella Music and Arts Festival, their first performance at the festival since last headlining in 2011. During their performance at the second weekend of the festival, they concluded their set with a performance of "Oblivius" accompanied by an onscreen montage that condemned US involvement in foreign affairs, particularly the CIA-led overthrows of foreign governments and the wars in Gaza and in Iran. On May 13, the second single, "Falling out of Love", was released. On May 15, the band announced that Nick Valensi would be absent from the upcoming tour; they simultaneously announced that Steve Schiltz, the frontman of Longwave and longtime friend of the band (having known each other since the early days of the New York music scene), would be serving as Valensi's substitute.

On June 12, 2026, the band commenced the Reality Awaits Tour with a headlining performance at the Bonnaroo Music and Arts Festival in Manchester, Tennessee. It was the band's first time headlining the festival since last performing in 2011. They also debuted the full length version of their new single 'Falling Out of Love.' Later that month, the band released a music video for "Going Shopping" that starred American actor Walton Goggins and paid homage to Paul Simon's music video for "You Can Call Me Al". Casablancas, Hammond and Fraiture all prominently featured in the video, while Moretti made a brief cameo; Valensi did not appear in the clip.

However, on June 11, 2026, the band announced that the Reality Awaits release date would be pushed back from June 26 to July 24, without providing further reasoning. On June 18, guitarist Albert Hammond Jr. explained the situation by responding to a fan on X, saying that the band wanted to align the digital streaming release date to match that of the vinyl release. The message was deleted promptly after sending, but not before being picked up by news outlets.

On July 24, 2026, the band released their anticipated seventh studio album, Reality Awaits. The album received generally positive reviews from fans and critics, but it also garnished some criticism due to Casablancas's heavy use of vocoder.

On the same day, they also released In Transit: Part II on YouTube, a 10-minute mini-documentary and behind-the-scenes of how the band and Rick Rubin recorded the album in Costa Rica. It serves as a follow-up to their original 2004 tour documentary, In Transit.

On August 8, 2026, the band performed at the Outside Lands Music Festival in San Francisco, California. It was the band's second time headlining the festival since their polarizing 2021 appearance. During their set, they brought out Charli XCX to perform their song "Take It or Leave It". Later that month, the band performed at the Summer Sonic Festival in Japan. During their performance, they live debuted their song "Lonely in the Future" from their new album Reality Awaits.

On October 2, 2026, the band performed a homecoming concert at Flushing Meadows–Corona Park in New York City. The event also brought Beach House, TV on the Radio, and Fcukers as opening acts.

The next month, the band made their fifth appearance as the musical guest for the November 7th episode of Saturday Night Live with Druski hosting, where they performed "Lonely in the Future" and "Going Shopping" from Reality Awaits. While performing "Going Shopping," Walton Goggins made a surprise cameo and played bongos on stage. A day after the show the band released the official music video for their song "Lonely in the Future." The music video featured puppets of the band as well as high profile billionaires and online music critics, including Anthony Fantano.

== Musical style ==
The band's sound has been described as indie rock, garage rock revival, and post-punk revival by media outlets. The band also incorporated new wave and synth-pop on later records like Angles and The New Abnormal. Casablancas has cited The Doors as an inspiration for him to start a music career, and Lou Reed of the Velvet Underground as a major influence on his lyrics and singing style: "The way Lou Reed wrote and sang about drugs and sex, about the people around him – it was so matter-of-fact," Casablancas stated in a Rolling Stone interview, "Reed could be romantic in the way he portrayed these crazy situations, but he was also intensely real. It was poetry and journalism." Additionally, he has stated that Bob Marley, Nirvana and Pearl Jam are major influences on his work, the latter being the reason that he started making music after hearing the song "Yellow Ledbetter".

== Legacy and influence ==
The Strokes' debut album Is This It was named the number-one album of the year by NME and number two by Rolling Stone in 2001. The album won Best International Album in 2002 at the NME Awards, as well as the ASCAP Vanguard Award. That same year, the band was named Band of the Year by Spin.

The Strokes have been said to be "as influential to their era as The Velvet Underground or the Ramones were to theirs" by Lizzy Goodman in her 2017 book on the New York City music scene in the 2000s, Meet Me in the Bathroom – so named for a Strokes song from Room on Fire. "Almost every artist I interviewed for this book – from all over the world – said it was The Strokes that opened the door for them," she said. James Murphy of LCD Soundsystem later referred to Is This It as his "record of the decade." The Strokes have heavily influenced bands like The Killers, Arctic Monkeys, and Franz Ferdinand. Brandon Flowers of The Killers told NME that he felt "depressed" after hearing Is This It: "That record just sounded so perfect", he said. "We threw away everything [we were working on], and the only song that made the cut and remained was "Mr. Brightside"'. Arctic Monkeys, in particular, have paid direct tribute to the band by covering "Take It or Leave It" and "Is This It" live, as well as referencing them in the lyrics of "Star Treatment", the opening song from their 2018 album Tranquility Base Hotel and Casino. Other bands that have cited the Strokes as an influence include Wet Leg and We Are Scientists.

== Band members ==
- Julian Casablancas – lead vocals (1998–present), occasional keyboards (2009–present), drums (2005; studio only)
- Nick Valensi – guitar, occasional backing vocals (1998–present), keyboards (2005–present) (touring hiatus since 2026)
- Fabrizio Moretti – drums, percussion (1998–present), keyboards, occasional backing vocals (2009–present)
- Nikolai Fraiture – bass (1998–present), occasional keyboards (2009–present)
- Albert Hammond Jr. – guitar, occasional backing vocals (1998–present), keyboards (2009–present)

Touring musicians

- Steve Schiltz – guitar (2026–present)

== Discography ==
Studio albums

- Is This It (2001)
- Room on Fire (2003)
- First Impressions of Earth (2005)
- Angles (2011)
- Comedown Machine (2013)
- The New Abnormal (2020)
- Reality Awaits (2026)
