= Nikolai Fraiture =

American bassist (born 1978)

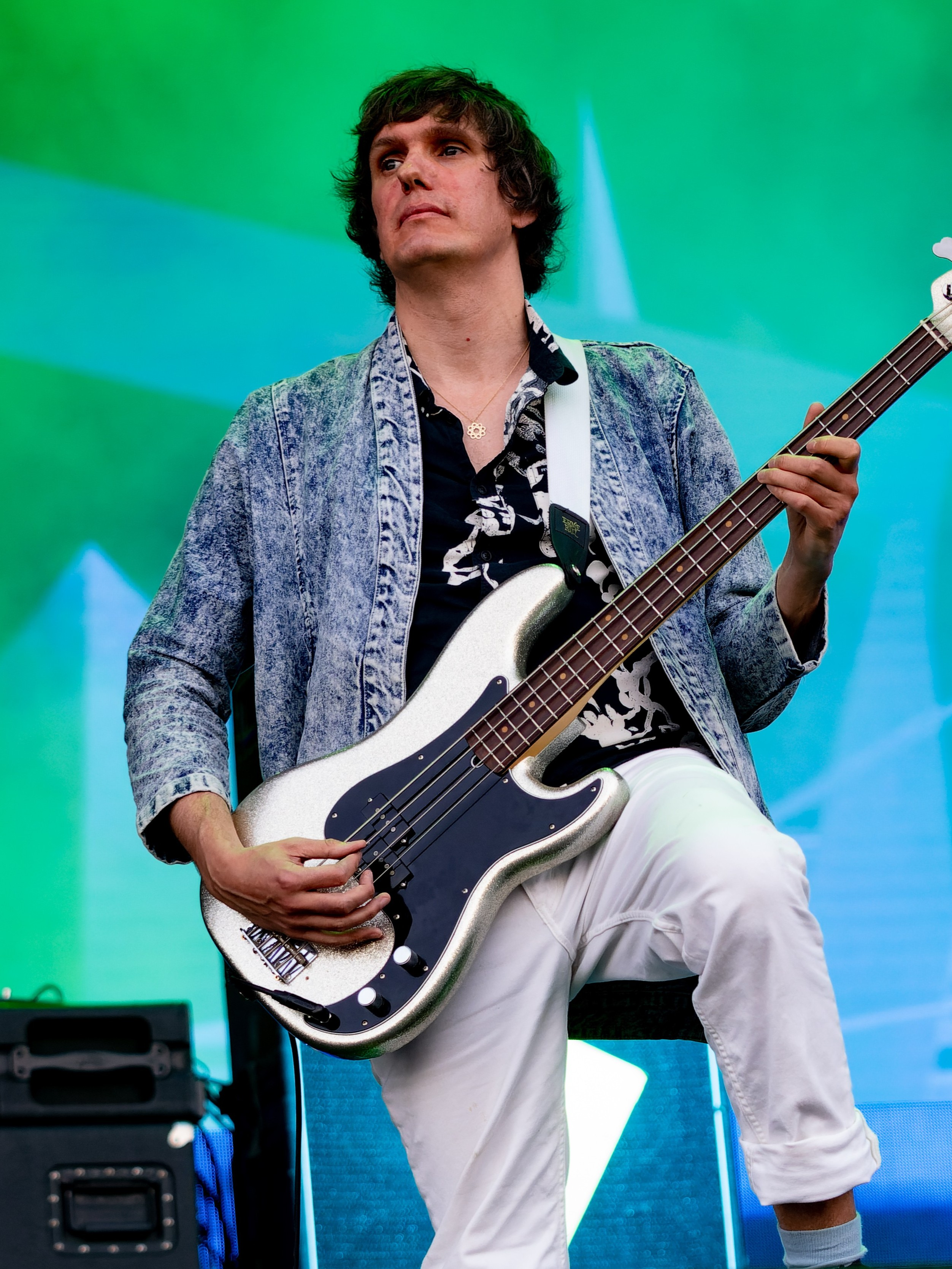
- Fraiture performing with the Strokes in 2022
- Born: Nikolai Philippe Fraiture; November 13, 1978 (age 48); New York City, U.S.
- Other name: Nickel Eye
- Occupation: Musician
- Spouse: Ilona Jankovich (m. 2004)
- Children: 2
- Musical career
- Genres: Indie rock; garage rock; post-punk revival; new wave
- Instruments: Bass guitar
- Years active: 1998–present
- Labels: Rough Trade; RCA; Cult Records
- Member of: The Strokes; Summer Moon
- Website: thestrokes.com

Nikolai Philippe Fraiture (French pronunciation: [fʁɛtyʁ]; born November 13, 1978) is an American musician best known as the bassist of the rock band the Strokes. Since co-founding the band in 1998, he has released seven studio albums with them. Among other creative projects, Fraiture released a solo record under the name Nickel Eye in 2009 and has been the frontman of the band Summer Moon since 2016.

== Early life ==
Fraiture was born in New York City to a French-Russian mother and French father. He was raised with his older brother Pierre and younger sister Elizabeth in the Yorkville neighborhood of the Upper East Side. Fraiture met future bandmate Julian Casablancas at the age of six while attending the Friends School and Lycée Français de New York, from which he graduated in 1997. Through Casablancas, Fraiture met future Strokes members Nick Valensi and Fabrizio Moretti while they were teenagers. Fraiture later attended Hunter College with Valensi.

Fraiture received his first bass at 16 when his grandfather gave it to him as a graduation present, but Fraiture gave it away to Casablancas and did not resume playing until two years later.

== Career ==
=== The Strokes ===
Fraiture took up bass when he was around 18 and started playing in a band with childhood friend Julian Casablancas, guitarist Nick Valensi, and drummer Fabrizio Moretti. The Strokes were formed in 1998 when guitarist Albert Hammond Jr. joined the group. After a year of rehearsing and playing at small venues, and several rejections from record companies, the group caught the interest of Ryan Gentles, then a booker at New York's Mercury Lounge. Gentles sent their three-track demo to Geoff Travis of Rough Trade Records and their first EP The Modern Age was released on the label, followed by a tour in England to promote the EP, with Gentles joining them as their manager. After a bidding war, the band signed with RCA in March 2001. Their first album, Is This It, was released in summer 2001. Following the completion of their five-album contract deal with RCA Records in 2013, the band has continued to release new music through Casablancas' Cult Records.

=== Nickel Eye ===
Fraiture started his side project, Nickel Eye, during the hiatus after First Impressions of Earth. He enlisted the help of South, a UK band introduced to him by a friend, as his backing band. Nickel Eye recorded some demos at South Studios in Hackney, London. With some guest appearances by Nick Zinner of the New York City-based band Yeah Yeah Yeahs and Regina Spektor, The Time of the Assassins was completed a few months later in New York. The album is musically inspired by some of Fraiture's favorite artists, such as Neil Young, Frank Black, Leonard Cohen, and The Kinks. The Time of the Assassins was released on January 27, 2009 on Rykodisc. Nickel Eye’s first performance was on October 15, 2008 at London’s Borderline venue.

As Nickel Eye, Fraiture released 2014 demo "Same Difference" digitally in 2020.

=== Summer Moon ===
In 2016, Fraiture started a new band, Summer Moon with Jane’s Addiction’s Stephen Perkins (drums), Uh Huh Her’s Camila Grey (keyboardist and vocalist), and The Airborne Toxic Event's Noah Harmon (guitar), with Fraiture providing vocals and bass for the group. The group's debut album With You Tonight was released in 2017. As of 2020, the band is working on an EP.

=== Other collaborations ===
In 2007, Fraiture composed the music and starred in the movie A Kind of Dream with wife Illy Fraiture. The movie was a 30-minute black and white silent film written and directed by Danny Velez.

On May 19, 2012, for the 37th season finale of Saturday Night Live, Fraiture played bass alongside Arcade Fire and guest/musical host Mick Jagger.

Fraiture is one-half of the performance art project Arts Elektra with his brother Pierre Fraiture, a New York-based mixed medium artist. The duo combines live performance of original rock music compositions with live painting. Beginning in 2019, Arts Elektra launched a twelve-act, site-specific piece entitled C'est Le Moment Ou Jamais (It's Now Or Never) at different locations globally. Their first act was performed in April 2019 at the World Trade Center in New York City and the second act was presented that December during Art Basel week at the Miami River Art Fair. The works created are auctioned off to benefit different charities.

== Personal life ==
Fraiture married artist Ilona "Illy" Jankovich in 2004. They have two children, Elysia and Phoenix.

The family lives in New York City and have lived in the West Village neighborhood for a number of years.

Fraiture and his wife practice Nichiren Buddhism in the Soka Gakkai Buddhist tradition.

== Discography ==
Solo discography (as Nickel Eye)

- The Time of the Assassins (2009)

Summer Moon discography

- With You Tonight (2017)
- Casino Days (2023)
- Dancing on a Moonbeam (2024)

The Strokes discography

- Is This It (2001)
- Room on Fire (2003)
- First Impressions of Earth (2005)
- Angles (2011)
- Comedown Machine (2013)
- The New Abnormal (2020)
- Reality Awaits (2026)
