= Nick Valensi =

American musician (born 1981)

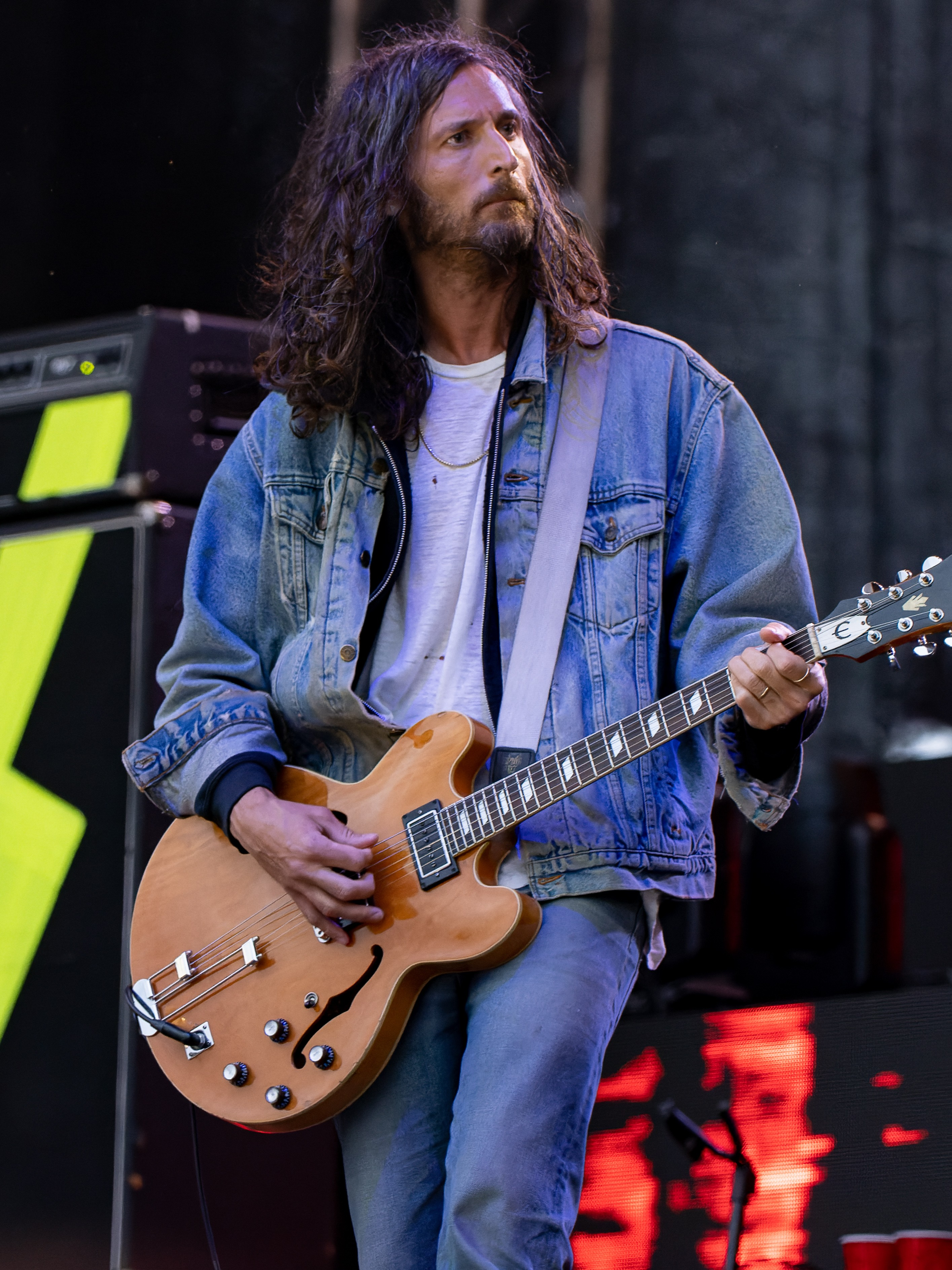
- Valensi performing with the Strokes in 2022
- Born: Nicholas Valensi; January 16, 1981 (age 45); New York City, U.S.
- Occupations: Musician; composer; songwriter; singer
- Spouse: Amanda de Cadenet (m. 2006)
- Children: 2
- Musical career
- Genres: Indie rock; garage rock revival; post-punk revival; new wave
- Instruments: Guitar; keyboards; vocals
- Years active: 1998–present
- Labels: Rough Trade; RCA; Cult Records
- Member of: The Strokes; CRX
- Website: thestrokes.com

Nicholas Valensi (born January 16, 1981) is an American musician, best known for his role as a guitarist in the American rock band The Strokes. Since 2001, the band has released seven studio albums, some of which Valensi has also contributed keyboards and backing vocals.

In 2013, Valensi founded the band CRX, for which he acts as singer, songwriter, and lead and rhythm guitarist. Their debut album, New Skin, was released in 2016, and was followed by the 2019 album Peek. Valensi has also worked as a songwriter and session guitarist with various artists, including Sia, Regina Spektor, Kate Pierson, Kesha and Ringo Starr.

== Early life ==
Valensi was born in New York City to a Tunisian Jewish father and a French Jewish-convert mother, Danielle. His mother was from a Catholic family in Southwestern France, near Bordeaux, and moved to Boston as a teenager, and met his father in New York; his mother converted to Judaism to marry his father. Valensi has described his father as an observant Jew.

Valensi was raised on the Upper East Side of Manhattan with two sisters, Céline and Alessandra. Until the age of 16, Valensi spent summers at his grandfather's home near Bordeaux. He began learning guitar at the age of five, following an impromptu strum on one of his father's guitars. His father described him as a natural guitarist, due to his quickness at picking up the ability to strum along with the rhythm of songs at a young age. Valensi's father died when Nick was nine. Valensi was arrested at age 11 and was assigned a probation officer for a year.

Valensi attended New York City public schools while growing up. He began attending The Dwight School at age 13, where he met Julian Casablancas on the first day of the school's orientation program. Soon after, he met classmate Fabrizio Moretti and the three formed a band. He was once quoted as saying, "I always thought I wanted to be able to play any song you could name. But once I started playing with Julian, that's when I really started to understand music." Through Casablancas, Valensi also met Nikolai Fraiture during this time. The two later attended Hunter College together.

== Career ==
=== The Strokes ===
In the late 1990s, Valensi was part of an informal band with vocalist Casablancas and drummer Moretti in high school, and continued after he and Casablancas left Dwight. Nikolai Fraiture started playing as the bassist, and the band was formed when guitarist Albert Hammond Jr. joined in the fall of 1998. Their first show as The Strokes was at the Spiral in New York City on September 14, 1999. The band released The Modern Age EP in 2001 under Rough Trade Records and was signed for a five-album record deal by RCA Records. The band released six LPs, including Is This It, Room on Fire, First Impressions of Earth, Angles, Comedown Machine, and The New Abnormal, with tours and festival sets in North America, Europe, South America, East Asia, and Australia. Following the completion of their album contract deal with RCA Records in 2013, the band has continued to release new music through Casablancas' Cult Records. On May 15, 2026, the band announced that Valensi would be absent from the upcoming tour because of personal reasons, the band chose Longwave frontman Steve Schiltz to replace him.

=== CRX ===
In 2013, Valensi co-founded the Los Angeles-based rock band CRX. He is the frontman of the group and is backed by drummer Ralph Alexander, multi-instrumentalist Brad Oberhofer, bassist Jon Safley, and guitarist Darian Zahedi. The band released their debut album, New Skin, on October 28, 2016. This was followed by the 2019 record Peek. Valensi has described the band's sound as a mix of power pop and heavy metal, and has named The Cars, Cheap Trick and Elvis Costello as influences.

=== Other projects ===
While much of his career has been focused on playing and writing for The Strokes and CRX, Valensi has also contributed as a session musician and songwriter to some of his contemporaries. One of his first notable credits was playing guitar for Regina Spektor's song "Better," which was released on her 2006 album Begin to Hope and also published as a single in a slightly different version on which the guitar parts are rearranged.

He has collaborated with artists Devendra Banhart, The Strokes' Moretti, and Sia on multiple occasions. Nick Valensi sang backing vocals and played guitar for Devendra Banhart's song "Shabop Shalom" on the 2007 album Smokey Rolls Down Thunder Canyon. Furthermore, he contributed backing vocals on the self-titled debut album of his bandmate Fab Moretti's band, Little Joy. He appears in the video for "No One's Better Sake" by Little Joy as drummer. He also appears in the video for "Adam & Steve," a song by Devendra Banhart and Moretti's side project Megapuss.

He plays guitar on Sia's album 2010 We Are Born and has also written several hooks and melodies on it. Sia has also stated that she and Valensi are planning to write songs together for other artists. He also co-wrote the track "Hostage" on Sia's 2014 album 1000 Forms of Fear. Other credits include co-writing with Brody Dalle in 2014, Kate Pierson for her 2015 album Guitars and Microphones, Kesha, and again with Sia for the 2017 Blondie track, "Best Day Ever." Nick also appeared in the 'GeorgeFest' concert in 2016 honoring the music of George Harrison. For his part he played a rousing rendition of "Wah-Wah".

== Instruments and influences ==
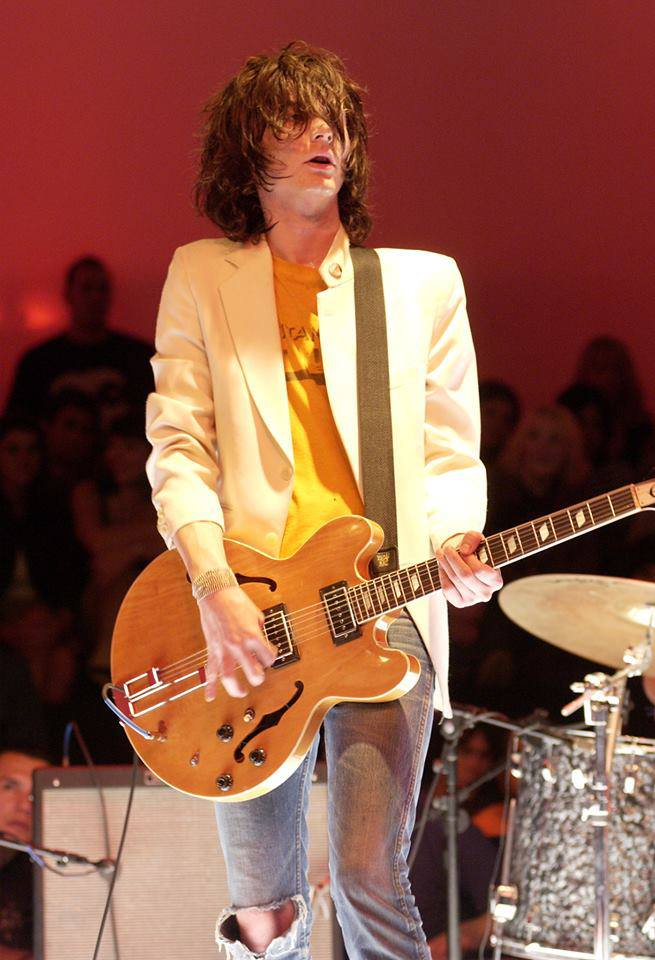
Valensi in 2002

Valensi's main guitar, which he uses for nearly every live show and recorded song, is a 1995 Epiphone Riviera with Gibson P-94 pick-ups, which was given to him by friend and fellow Strokes guitarist Albert Hammond Jr. In a 2004 interview with Epiphone, he called it "the greatest guitar never made" because Gibson had never produced a semi-hollow with humbucker-sized P-94 pickups. He has several models in different colours (all with P-94s), including multiple naturals, one in vintage sunburst, one in red, and a 12-string elite in red. In 2005, Epiphone released a signature model of his guitar, the Elitist Nick Valensi Riviera P-94, and followed it up with a standard model Nick Valensi Riviera P-94 in 2007. Back-up/warm-up guitars include an Epiphone Dot fitted with 2 P-94s, an Epiphone Casino, an Epiphone Sheraton, and a Gibson Faded Special Double Cutaway with 2 P-90s. Valensi often borrows fellow Strokes guitarist Albert Hammond, Jr.'s backup guitars, which include a Gibson Les Paul Jr. and a Les Paul Special. New guitars used for the First Impressions of Earth tour included a Les Paul Custom in black, a Fender Telecaster Custom (which he can be seen using in the music video for Under Cover of Darkness ), and a Duesenberg semi-hollow. Valensi's main amplifier is a 2x12" Fender Hot Rod DeVille, used with Fender 4x12" extension cabinets during live shows. He also recently purchased a Carr amplifier to use on the last few stops of the First Impressions tour.

His pedalboard has included the Visual Sound Jekyll & Hyde Ultimate overdrive pedal, Boss TR-2 Tremolo, Vox Cooltron Bulldog Distortion, MXR Micro Amp, Boss TU-2 Chromatic Tuner, Electro-Harmonix Memory Man, and Boss Blues Driver. He uses a Fender Super-Sonic 100-watt head into two Fender 2x12" cabinets.

He cites his influences as The Velvet Underground, The Cars, George Harrison, Slash, Bob Marley, and Blondie.

== Personal life ==
In summer 2006, Valensi married his girlfriend of four years, English photographer and television personality Amanda de Cadenet. With De Cadenet, Valensi has fraternal twins, Silvan and Ella. He has a step-daughter, Atlanta, through de Cadenet's first marriage. De Cadenet published a book of photographs entitled Rare Birds in 2005, which includes several pictures of Valensi, whom she refers to as her "muse" on her website. Valensi has lived with his family in Los Angeles since the mid-2000s. In the past, they have lived in the neighborhoods of Van Nuys and Studio City in Los Angeles and in Midtown Manhattan and Park Slope in New York City.

Valensi speaks French.

== Discography ==
CRX discography

- New Skin (2016)
- Peek (2019)
- Interiors (2024)

The Strokes discography

- Is This It (2001)
- Room on Fire (2003)
- First Impressions of Earth (2005)
- Angles (2011)
- Comedown Machine (2013)
- The New Abnormal (2020)
- Reality Awaits (2026)
