= Fabrizio Moretti =

Brazilian-American drummer

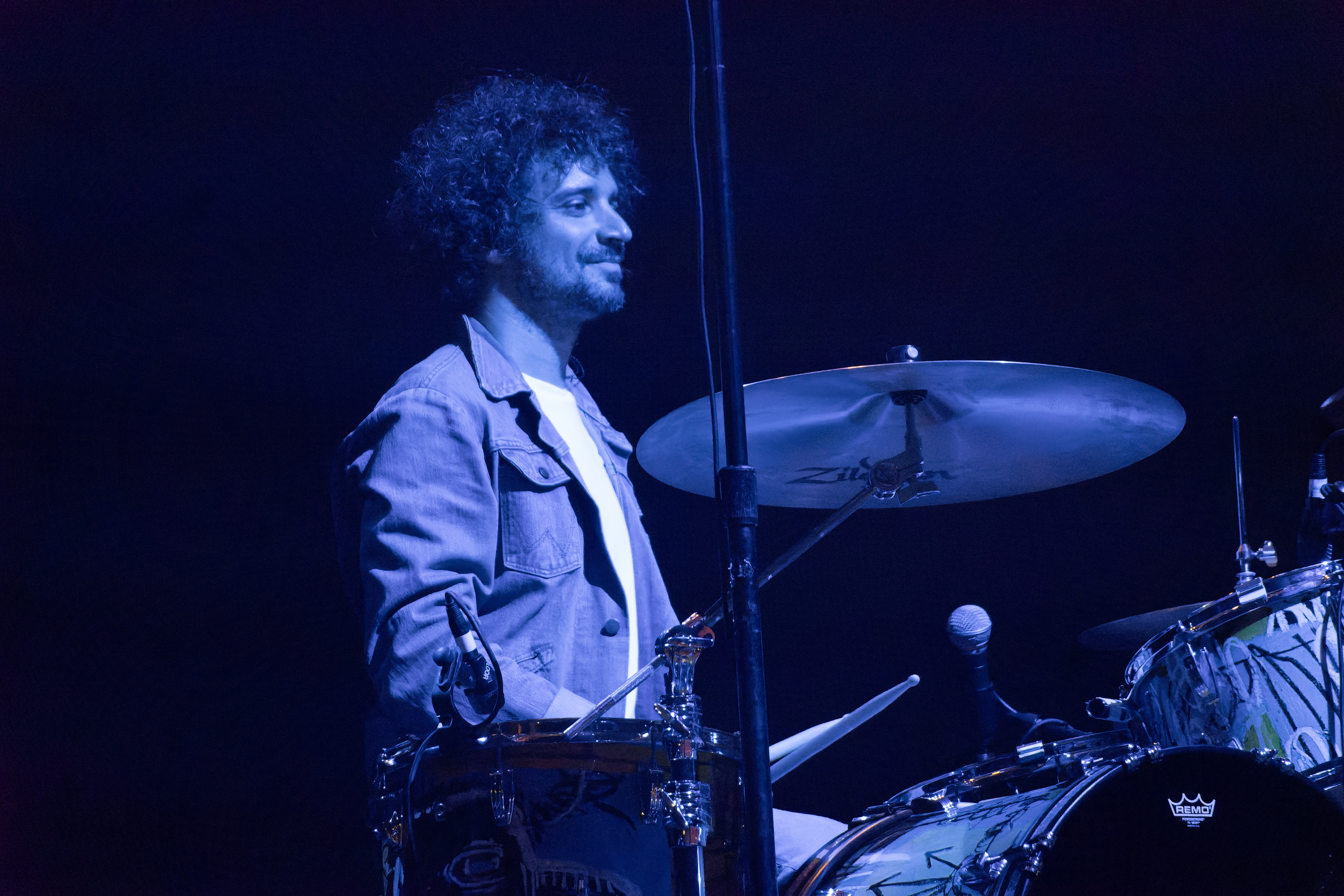
- Moretti performing with the Strokes in 2023
- Born: June 2, 1980 (age 46); Rio de Janeiro, Brazil
- Occupations: Musician; DJ; visual artist
- Spouse: Gabriella Corey (m. 2024)
- Musical career
- Genres: Indie rock; garage rock; post-punk revival; new wave
- Instruments: Drums; percussion; keyboards; guitar
- Years active: 1998–present
- Labels: RCA; Rough Trade; Cult
- Member of: The Strokes; machinegum
- Formerly of: Little Joy; Megapuss
- Website: thestrokes.com

Fabrizio "Fab" Moretti (born June 2, 1980) is an American musician and visual artist best known as the drummer for American rock band The Strokes, with whom he has released seven studio albums since 2001. A collaborative artist, he has been part of a series of groups since the mid-2000s, most notably the Brazilian-American band Little Joy, which released one album in 2008, and the experimental pop collective Machinegum, which he has led since 2018. Throughout his career, Moretti has worked on a variety of art projects which span the mediums of drawing, sculpture, and installation and performance art.

== Early life ==
Moretti was born in Rio de Janeiro, Brazil to Stefano, an Italian nuclear engineer, and Ana Moretti, a Brazilian. He was raised with his older brother, Leo Moretti. Moretti and his family moved to New York City when he was three years old for his father's career; they planned to live there for only three years, but ended up staying for seventeen before returning to Brazil. Speaking on identity during his young adulthood in New York, Moretti said, "I didn't feel like a Brazilian, I didn't feel like an Italian, and I certainly didn't feel like an American. So I was walking around trying to find my identity through New York City."

He began playing the drums at age five, playing in a soundproofed closet in his family's Midtown Manhattan apartment, and became more serious during high school. As an adolescent, Moretti attended the Anglo American International School, which later merged with the Dwight School and is where he met fellow band members Nick Valensi and Julian Casablancas. Upon graduating high school, Moretti studied sculpture at SUNY New Paltz before dropping out to focus on his music career with The Strokes.

== Career ==
=== The Strokes ===
Moretti began drumming in an informal band with vocalist Casablancas and guitarist Valensi in high school, and continued after the two left Dwight. Later, Nikolai Fraiture joined as the bassist and the band was formed when guitarist Albert Hammond Jr. joined in fall 1998. Their first show as The Strokes was at the Spiral in New York City on September 14, 1999. The band released The Modern Age EP in 2001 under Rough Trade Records and was signed for a five-album record deal by RCA Records. The band released six LPs including Is This It, Room on Fire, First Impressions of Earth, Angles, Comedown Machine and The New Abnormal with tours and festival sets in the North America, Europe, South America, East Asia and Australia. Following the completion of their album contract deal with RCA Records in 2013, the band has continued to release new music through Casablancas' Cult Records.

Moretti's drumming style has been called crisp and clean, and having a mature elegance. He has said that he wants to provide a steady, driving force with his playing which resulted in him simplifying his drum kit to a four-piece set up with a hi-hat and ride cymbals. He commonly uses a Ludwig Classic Maple drum kit with Zildjian cymbals and Ahead sticks. Early on, he was known for drumming very hard, often breaking his drumsticks. Early records convey a more simplistic and 'punk' style of playing and recording, while later records feature more compressed drums in the style of industrial and dance music.

=== Little Joy ===
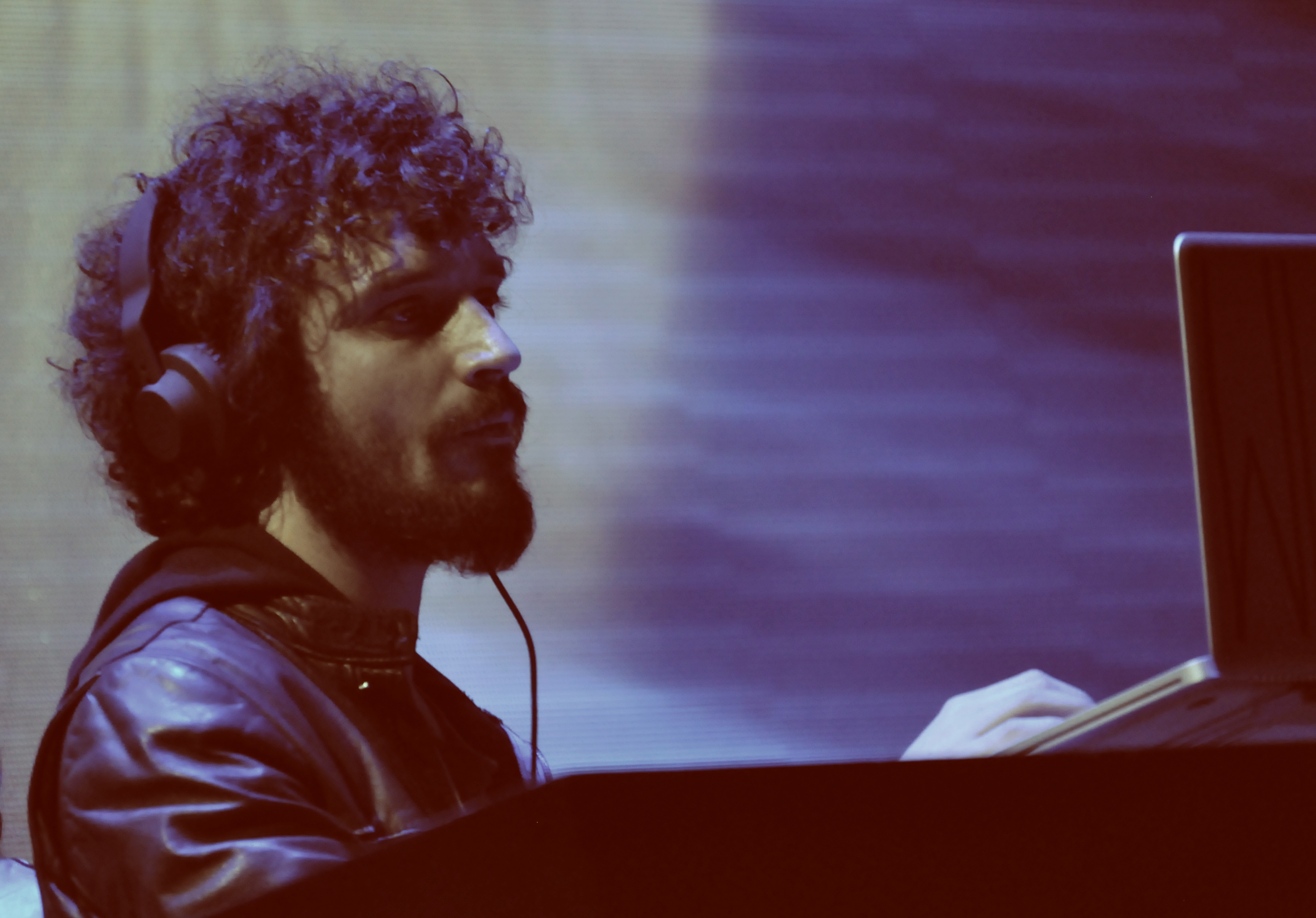
Moretti in 2013

In 2007, Moretti joined with Los Hermanos guitarist, singer, songwriter Rodrigo Amarante and Binki Shapiro to form the trio Little Joy, a Los Angeles-based Brazilian/American rock supergroup. Amarante and Moretti had met in 2006, at a festival in Lisbon where both their bands were performing, and the idea came up to start a new musical project unrelated to their respective bands. Little Joy was signed to Rough Trade Records label. Their debut album, produced by Noah Georgeson, was released in 2008.

=== Machinegum ===
Since 2018, Moretti has led the New York synth pop band and artist collective Machinegum (stylized machinegum) which both performs and records music and presents gallery installations. The group is composed of Moretti and Ian Devaney (vocalist of Nation of Language), Delicate Steve, Chris Egan, Martin Bonventre, and Erin Victoria Axtel. The group has also collaborated with architect Joseph Vescio and actor/director Justin Bartha in the past.

Machinegum released their debut album Conduit in December 2019. Released on Frenchkiss Records, the group later signed to the record label in February 2020.

=== Other projects ===
==== Music ====
Outside of his more traditional musical work, Moretti's output often blends musical, performance, and visual art. He has frequently collaborated with musicians Devendra Banhart, Rodrigo Amarante, and New York City contemporaries including his Strokes bandmates. He has contributed songwriting and remixes to other artists and, throughout his career, has deejayed events.

Moretti was part of a project, Megapuss, with Devendra Banhart, Gregory Rogove and Noah Georgeson in 2008. The group released one album, Surfing. The following year, Moretti and Banhart collaborated on a project called Permanent Adventure. Moretti played drums for Neon Neon, on their track "Dream Cars", from 2008's Stainless Style. Moretti also played on Kesha's 2012 song "Only Wanna Dance With You", together with bandmate Julian Casablancas. He co-wrote "Prisoner," from Har Mar Superstar's 2013 album Bye Bye 17, with Banhart and Amarante. Moretti and Amarante also were part of Banhart's backing band during his 2013 tour which had dates in the US and Europe. Moretti also contributed to Amarante's debut solo album in 2014.

In 2015, Moretti remixed Spoon's 2014 track "Inside Out" for the band's remix EP. In 2016, Moretti contributed an Eagles of Death Metal cover for the Play it Forward campaign, supporting aid for the victims of the 2015 Paris attacks; with Beck and Nick Valensi, he covered "I Love You All the Time." Moretti sat-in as drummer for The 8G Band, the house band for Late Night with Seth Meyers, during the second weeks of April 2016 and January 2023. Moretti played drums on the 2017 track "Indignities” by New York synth-pop band Nation Of Language; he also filled in as bassist on one of the band's tours. In 2018, Moretti contributed the original instrumental song "In Case of Separation" to French conceptual artist Sophie Calle's "tribute" album, Souris Calle.

In 2007, it was announced that Moretti was to executive produce a VH1 series called Clash of the Music Videos with then-girlfriend Drew Barrymore. However, the show was never produced.

==== Art ====
Moretti is an enthusiastic visual artist and enjoys sculpture and drawing. Since the mid-2000s, he has been contributing his work to various projects. This includes a 2013 art installation for Rag + Bone and showcasing his drawings in New York. He has also worked on artistic project FUZLAB with French cartoonist Luz in 2012; he continued to collaborate with Luz later in the decade, at one point sharing a studio with him in Paris. In 2017, a sculpture of his was included at a show in New York City's Elizabeth Street Garden.

In December 2019, Moretti collaborated with Italian art dealer Fabrizio Moretti to present the exhibit Fabrizio Moretti x Fabrizio Moretti In Passing at Sotheby's in New York City. The latter Moretti curated a collection of Old Master paintings and the former conceptualized the interactive exhibit.

In December 2021, Moretti designed and built, "Kube," a nine-foot tall installation made of one-way mirror, polished steel and fluorescent lights. Inspired by the work of Yayoi Kusama and Bruce Nauman, "Kube" was crafted by hand in Brooklyn with the help of welder Franco V. and artist girlfriend Gabriella Corey, and was designed to showcase the viewer and the object together as one being repeated ad infinitum. Anish Kapoor's "Mirror (Pagan Gold to Organic Green)", a disc of polished and highly reflective aluminium, is placed inside the Kube. In an interview with Flaunt Magazine, Moretti describes the experience from within the Kube, "[t]he crux of this is that you become part of the art work when you’re in it, as you just experienced. When you’re inside, you can’t see out. It’s almost like the viewer becomes this nebulous being—but outside the box, you can be seen very clearly.” Speaking to the LA Times on the concept of the work, Moretti describes, "[t]he mirror can be a source of vanity... But it can also be a point of self-reflection, you kind of see yourself outside yourself, one of many perhaps. And being able to see yourself and the relationship you have with the artwork kind of sanctifies that moment—I’m hoping."

== Personal life ==
He was born in Brazil and has lived in the United States from a young age, eventually becoming a citizen of the United States in addition to holding citizenship with his father's country of origin, Italy. Moretti speaks English, Portuguese, Italian and French.

From 2002 to 2007, Moretti was in a highly publicized relationship with actress Drew Barrymore. In 2007, he briefly dated actress Kirsten Dunst. He was later in a four-year relationship with Little Joy bandmate Binki Shapiro. From late 2011 to 2013, he dated actress Kristen Wiig. In August 2020, he started dating art historian Gabriella Corey. The two were engaged in 2023 and married in 2024.

Moretti resides in New York City, where he maintains an apartment near Union Square in the East Village, which he purchased in 2003. During the late 2010s, he lived in Paris for some time.

== Discography ==
Solo discography (as remix artist)

- "Inside Out" (2015) (originally by Spoon)
- "Oblivius" (2016) (originally by The Strokes)

The Strokes discography

- Is This It (2001)
- Room on Fire (2003)
- First Impressions of Earth (2005)
- Angles (2011)
- Comedown Machine (2013)
- The New Abnormal (2020)
- Reality Awaits (2026)

Little Joy discography

- Little Joy (2008)

Other studio albums

- Surfing (2008) (as part of Megapuss)
- Conduit (2019) (as part of machinegum)
