= Cult Records =

American independent record label

- Founded: 2009
- Founder: Julian Casablancas
- Distributors: Kobalt Label Services (UK and US); Sony Music Entertainment (International); ONErpm (digital)
- Genre: Various
- Country of origin: United States
- Location: New York, New York
- Official website: www.cultrecords.com

Cult Records is an independent record label founded by Julian Casablancas (of The Strokes) in 2009. Initially used as an imprint for Casablancas' solo releases, Cult later became a standalone label, and in June 2014 entered a label services agreement with Kobalt as well as a digital distribution agreement with ONErpm.

The label's first release (with RCA) was Casablancas' debut solo album Phrazes for the Young. Cult Records have since put out records for a number of major artists, mostly from the New York area including Casablancas' own bands The Strokes and The Voidz, as well acts like The Growlers, Karen O, Albert Hammond Jr and The Virgins. Casablancas lamented the label missing out on Phoenix's breakout album Wolfgang Amadeus Phoenix and said they were close to signing Haim.

== Artists signed to Cult ==
=== Current ===
- Promiseland
- The Strokes
- The Voidz

=== Catalog Cult artists ===
- Albert Hammond, Jr.
- Cerebral Ballzy
- C O L O R
- Everything Everything
- Exclamation Pony (Jen Turner of Here We Go Magic and Ryan Jarman of The Cribs)
- Exhibition
- The Growlers
- Har Mar Superstar
- INHEAVEN
- Julian Casablancas
- Jehnny Beth & Julian Casablancas
- Karen O
- Rey Pila
- Reputante
- Songhoy Blues
- Surfbort
- The Virgins
