= Gus Oberg =

Swedish music producer and recording engineer

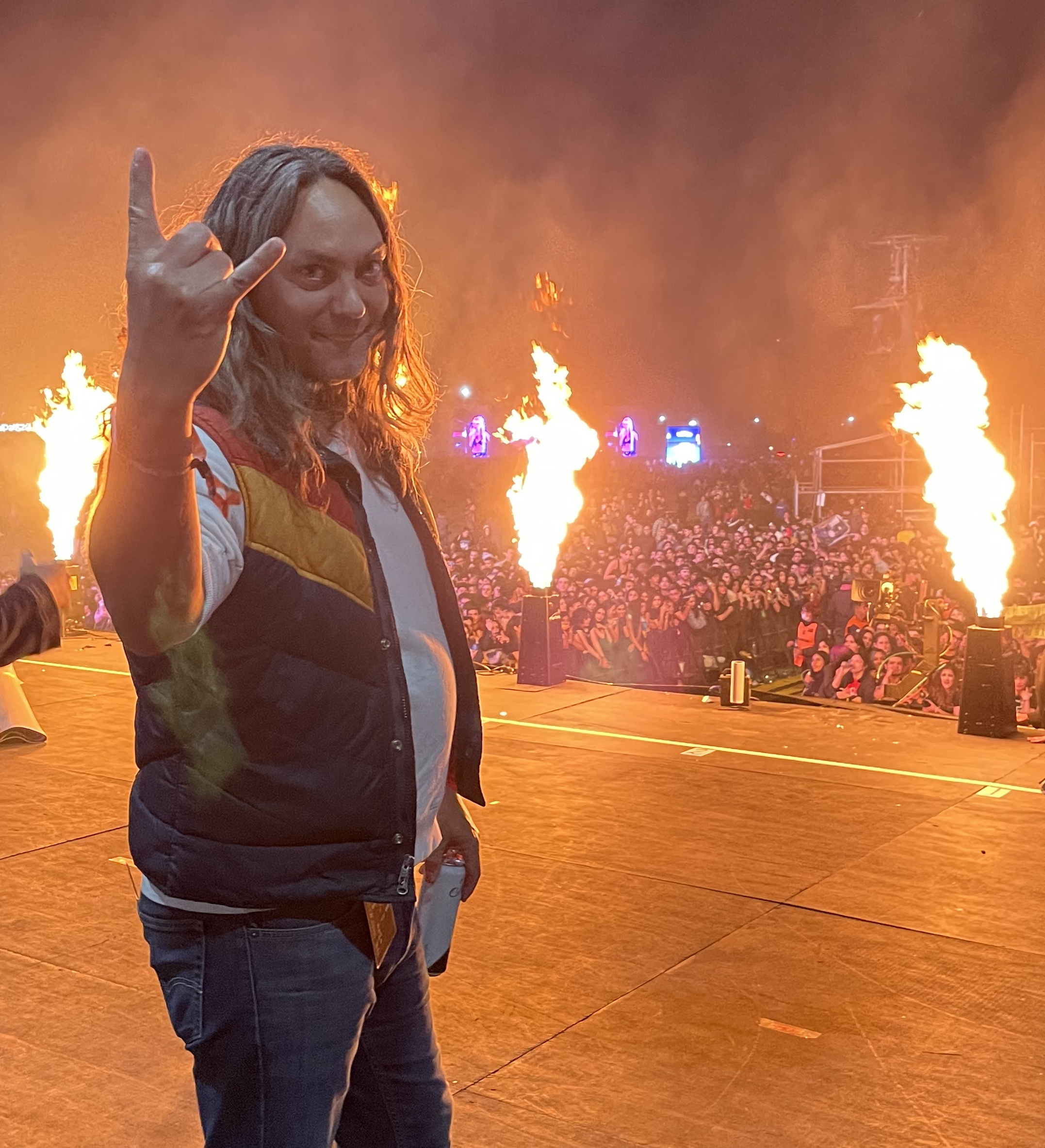
- Oberg in 2022

Background information
- Born: Erik Gustav Öberg; Sweden
- Origin: New York City, U.S.
- Genres: indie rock, post-punk revival
- Occupations: Music producer; audio engineer; mixing engineer
- Years active: 1997–present

Gus Oberg is a Swedish music producer and recording engineer. He is best known as the longtime engineer and producer of American rock band The Strokes, for whom he has worked since 2009. Oberg is also a close collaborator of Strokes guitarist Albert Hammond Jr. and has worked on every one of his solo records. Since the late 2000s, Oberg has produced numerous indie rock albums and has often worked with Hammond Jr. or Johnny T Yerington as a producing partner. Oberg won a Grammy Award in 2006 for his engineering work. Formerly based in New York City, Oberg now lives and works out of Austin, Texas.

== Career ==
Oberg moved from his native Sweden to New York City in 1997 to pursue audio engineering. His career took off in the early 2000s as an engineer at New York's Loho Studios. By the time the recording studio closed in 2007, Oberg had become chief engineer and studio manager, and had worked on records including Moby's Hotel (2005), Willie Nelson's Songbird (2006), and The Klezmatics' Wonder Wheel, for which he was awarded the 2006 Grammy Award for Best Contemporary World Music Album for his work as engineer. During this period, Oberg also met Strokes' guitarist Albert Hammond Jr. who, in 2005, was working on his debut solo record. The two quickly developed a strong creative relationship. Oberg engineered and produced Hammond Jr.'s records Yours To Keep and ¿Cómo Te Llama?, released in 2006 and 2008, respectively. The two later developed Hammond Jr.'s One Way Studios together, located in Upstate New York.

Following this early work with Hammond Jr., Oberg began recording sessions for The Strokes in January 2009 for what would become their 2011 album Angles. The Strokes had already written and demoed these songs, and Oberg recorded them at Avatar Studios with producer Joe Chiccarelli co-engineering. After a few months and eighteen songs, the band decided to rerecord a majority of the tracks exclusively with Oberg at Electric Lady and One Way studios. He ultimately co-produced and engineered most of the tracks on Angles. In mid-2012, he produced and recorded sessions at Electric Lady and One Way studios for their 2013 album Comedown Machine. Oberg also mixed the entire record. Following this album, Oberg produced and recorded Hammond Jr.'s EP AHJ, which was also released in 2013. In 2014, Oberg worked side by side with Hammond Jr. to produce his 2015 album Momentary Masters as well as other artists' albums. Also in 2015, Oberg went back into the studio with The Strokes to produce their EP Future Present Past. Released in 2016, Oberg produced and mixed the record in New York and Austin, Texas.

Following this, Oberg continued to work on Strokes-related projects. In 2016, Oberg mixed the debut album from Strokes bassist Nikolai Fraiture's project Summer Moon. He also engineered some of the tracks on the debut album New Skin by CRX, a group fronted by guitarist Nick Valensi. The following year, Oberg went to work producing Hammond Jr.'s 2018 follow-up record Francis Trouble, which he also mixed. During this period, Oberg recorded demos for what would be The Strokes' 2020 album The New Abnormal.

Throughout the 2010s, Oberg also produced a series of other albums by indie rock, punk rock, and post-punk revival bands. His earliest production credits outside of his work with Hammond Jr. include the 2011 albums Different Times by Five O'Clock Heroes and Mirrors by U.S. Royalty. He formed a creative partnership with musician Johnny T Yerington (Ryan Adams, Jesse Malin), producing the 2013 EP 7 Minutes In Heaven by Yerington's project Pornography with Adams. That year, Oberg and Yerington produced The Virgins' final album Strike Gently together and later produced songs for its spin-off band Public Access T.V. and the solo debut of lead singer Donald Cumming. They also produced Drowners' self-titled debut album and the 2017 album Primary Colors by singer-songwriter Kelsey Kerrigan. In 2014, Oberg produced albums for bands Walking Shapes, Loose Buttons, and Rathborne, the latter with Hammond Jr. Together, they also produced the 2015 album Ropewalk by The View and 2017's Say Goodbye to Memory by DYGL. In 2019, he was helping Hammond Jr. produce song for Natalie Imbruglia. As an engineer, he has also worked with artists like Har Mar Superstar and The Postelles (again, with Hammond Jr.).

== Selected discography ==
Studio albums

Year	Artist	Title	Producer	Audio Engineer	Mix Engineer	Notes
2006	The Klezmatics	Wonder Wheel		Yes		Won – Grammy Award for Best Contemporary World Music Album
2006	Willie Nelson	Songbird		Yes		Credited as second engineer
2006	Albert Hammond Jr.	Yours to Keep		Yes		Produced two bonus tracks
2008	Albert Hammond Jr.	¿Cómo Te Llama?	Yes	Yes	Yes	Produced and mixed with Matt Romano
2011	U.S. Royalty	Mirrors	Yes			Produced with the band
2011	The Strokes	Angles	Yes	Yes	Yes	Co-produced with the band and Joe Chiccarelli; mixed with Noah Georgeson
2011	Five O'Clock Heroes	Different Times	Yes		Yes	
2013	The Strokes	Comedown Machine	Yes	Yes	Yes	
2013	The Virgins	Strike Gently	Yes		Yes	Produced with Johnny T Yerington
2013	Pornography	7 Minutes In Heaven	Yes			Produced with Johnny T Yerington
2013	Albert Hammond Jr.	AHJ EP	Yes	Yes	Yes	
2014	Walking Shapes	Taka Come On	Yes			
2014	Rathborne	Soft	Yes			Co-produced with Albert Hammond Jr.
2014	Loose Buttons	Damage Gallery	Yes			
2014	Drowners	Drowners	Yes			Produced with Johnny T Yerington
2015	Albert Hammond Jr	Momentary Masters	Yes	Yes		
2015	Donald Cumming	Out Calls Only	Yes	Yes	Yes	Produced with Johnny T Yerington
2015	The View	Ropewalk	Yes			Produced with Albert Hammond Jr.
2016	Public Access T.V.	Never Enough	Yes			Executive produced with Johnny T Yerington; engineered two tracks
2016	The Strokes	Future Present Past EP	Yes	Yes	Yes	
2016	CRX	New Skin		Yes		Credited for additional engineering
2017	Kelsey Kerrigan	Primary Colors	Yes	Yes	Yes	Produced with Johnny T Yerington
2017	Summer Moon	With You Tonight			Yes	
2017	DYGL	Say Goodbye to Memory Den	Yes			Produced with Albert Hammond Jr.
2018	Albert Hammond Jr.	Francis Trouble	Yes	Yes	Yes	
2020	The Strokes	The New Abnormal		Yes		Credited for 'pre-production demos'
2020	Loose Buttons	Something Better	Yes			
