= Drowner =

Drowner, Drowners or The Drowners may refer to:

== Music ==
- The Drowners (Swedish band)
- Drowners, an American-Welsh indie rock band
  - Drowners (album), 2014
- "The Drowners", a 1992 single by Suede

== Other uses ==
- someone who dies by drowning, or one who drowns another
- Drowner, a maintainer of a water-meadow
- The Drowner, a 1996 novel by Robert Drewe
