= Ryan Gentles (music manager) =

American music manager

Ryan Michael Gentles
- Born: November 28, 1977 (age 48)
- Origin: New York City, New York
- Occupation: Music manager
- Years active: 1999–present

Ryan Michael Gentles (born November 28, 1977) is an American music manager and the CEO of Wiz Kid Management. He is best known as the longtime manager of the New York City-based band The Strokes, whom he managed from 2000 until 2020.

== Career ==
Gentles began his career in the music industry as a musician; he was the vocalist and guitarist in the band Timmsie's First Time which broke up in 1995 and then The Selzers, which broke up in 2000. Matthew Romano, The Strokes' drum technician and back-up drummer, was also in both bands, playing drums. While in school, Gentles interned for future Strokes publicist Jim Merlis at Geffen Records and New York music venue Mercury Lounge. After graduating in 1999, he was hired by Mercury Lounge and shortly became their booker. He soon came in contact with The Strokes who asked him "three or four times to manage them" despite the fact that professional managers were courting the band. He became their manager in 2000 and, at the insistence of frontman Julian Casablancas, had an equal share in the profits of the band, untypical of the music industry. Gentles was contracted to be The Strokes exclusive manager for five years and continued to manage them. He played a starring role in their 2003 music video "The End Has No End." He has been considered to be "the sixth Stroke." After twenty years of managing The Strokes, Gentles and the band parted ways in October 2020.

Gentles established his management firm, Wiz Kid Management, in 2003. In the early 2000s, he managed musicians Adam Green and Ryan Adams for a brief period. In January 2008, he merged his company with that of music business veteran's Danny Goldberg to form Gold Village/Wiz Kid Management. In June 2014, Wiz Kid joined the management division of production company C3 Presents.

Beginning in the mid-2000s, Gentles also managed other Strokes members' musical projects, including Albert Hammond, Jr.'s solo career, Nick Valensi's band CRX, and Fabrizio Moretti's project Machinegum. Gentles played guitar on one track of Strokes-guitarist Albert Hammond, Jr.'s 2006 album, titled Yours to Keep.

== Management roster ==
Current artists

- ROMES
- School of Seven Bells
- Streets of Laredo
- machinegum

Former artists

- The Strokes
- The Moldy Peaches
- Adam Green
- Ryan Adams
- Hinds
- Albert Hammond, Jr.
- CRX
- The Hunts
- Rathborne
- Nightbox
