= One Way Trigger =

Single by The Strokes

from the album Comedown Machine
- Released: January 25, 2013
- Recorded: 2011–2012
- Genre: New wave; synth-pop
- Length: 4:01
- Label: RCA
- Songwriters: Julian Casablancas; Nikolai Fraiture; Albert Hammond Jr.; Fabrizio Moretti; Nick Valensi
- Producer: Gus Oberg

The Strokes singles chronology
"Taken for a Fool" (2011)	"One Way Trigger" (2013)	"All the Time" (2013)

Alternative cover
- B movie-style lyrics sheet designed by Warren Fu.

"One Way Trigger" is a song by American rock band the Strokes. Written by the whole band, it was released as a free download ahead of their fifth studio album, Comedown Machine and was made available for streaming via YouTube and SoundCloud, and as a free download via the band's official website on January 25, 2013. Casablancas posted a stylized lyric sheet for the song, designed by long-time collaborator Warren Fu, on his official website on January 30, 2013. The song is one of the few from Comedown Machine to have been performed live, and is the only Strokes song to have ever been performed live by Hammond Jr. as a solo artist.

== Composition ==
The song was the first written by Hammond Jr. following rehabilitation for his drug addiction. It is synth-driven, similarly to several tracks on the band's previous album, Angles, and features unusual falsetto vocals from singer Julian Casablancas, as well as the first instance of an acoustic guitar on a Strokes recording.

== Track listing ==
No.	Title	Length
1.	"One Way Trigger"	4:01

== Charts ==
Chart (2013–2015)	Peak position
France (SNEP)	167
Japan Hot 100 (Billboard)	57
Mexico Ingles Airplay (Billboard)	32
