= AHJ =

AHJ may refer to:

- Authority having jurisdiction
- Hongyuan Airport, Sichuan, China, IATA code
- AHJ (EP), by Albert Hammond, Jr.
- American Headset Jack, an audio phone connector
