= Future Present Past =

EP by The Strokes

EP by the Strokes
- Released: June 3, 2016
- Recorded: 2015–2016
- Studio: The Music Building (New York City) Additional recording: Red Bull (New York City); Electric Lady (New York City); East Village Recording (New York City); Bronson Island (Los Angeles); One Way (Upstate New York); Magic Shop (New York City); Arlyn (Austin); The Cutting Room (New York City)
- Length: 19:27
- Label: Cult
- Producer: Gus Oberg

The Strokes chronology
Comedown Machine (2013)	Future Present Past (2016)	The New Abnormal (2020)

Future Present Past is the second EP by American band the Strokes, released on June 3, 2016 through Cult Records. The title represents each song: "Drag Queen" refers to the "future", "Oblivius"—the "present", and "Threat of Joy"—the "past".

== Promotion and release ==
The night before the announcement of Future Present Past, billboards in London and New York City began displaying promotional videos for the Strokes featuring a running figure and each word comprising the EP's title. Cult Records posted a video of one such billboard to its Instagram account. On May 26, 2016, the Strokes lead singer Julian Casablancas announced Future Present Past during the premiere of his SiriusXMU show Culture Void, and the album became available for pre-order. Three tracks from the EP were premiered that same day: "Oblivius" during the Culture Void broadcast, "Drag Queen" on Zane Lowe's Beats 1 show, and "Threat of Joy" on Annie Mac's BBC Radio 1 show. The Strokes performed each of the three songs on May 31 during a concert at the Capitol Theatre in Port Chester, New York. Beginning Memorial Day, the Strokes and Cult Records hosted a pop-up shop in New York City for a week.

The EP was released on June 3 via 10-inch vinyl and digital download, the same day as the Strokes' headline performance at the Governors Ball Music Festival. It was their first EP since The Observer in 2003 and their first record released under Casablancas' label Cult Records.

== Composition ==
The opening track "Drag Queen" features post-punk influences and pitch-shifted, compressed vocals, and its bassline drew comparisons to Joy Division and its successor New Order. Critics viewed its anti-capitalist, dystopia-focused lyrics as an exploration of themes that had influenced Casablancas' songwriting outside of the Strokes, including for The Voidz' 2014 album Tyranny. "Oblivius" features falsetto vocals Drowned in Sound's Derek Robertson described as maintaining the "very Occupy serious" tone of "Drag Queen"'s lyrics while introducing a more "joyous" sound. Critics found "Threat of Joy" to be reminiscent of the Strokes' musical style in their debut album Is This It. NME's Barry Nicolson noted the simplicity of the song's main riff and Casablancas' ad-libbing as influences from the Strokes' earlier work. The EP ends with a remix of "Oblivius" by the Strokes drummer Fabrizio Moretti. Slate's Darian Alexander described the remix as a "space-y, synth-y alternative version" of the original track.

== Packaging ==
The 10-inch vinyl release of Future Present Past features stickers featuring the Strokes' and Cult Records' logos, as well as digital download access for each track on the record. Cult Records sold limited edition red vinyl copies of the record on their website, in contrast with blue vinyl copies made available at retailers. The cover features the painting Low Go by Max Krance. Critics commented that the track listing corresponds sonically with the title—"Drag Queen" the future, "Oblivius" the present, and "Threat of Joy" the past.

== Music videos ==
On June 2, 2016, the band released a lyric video for "Drag Queen", featuring various vaporwave-themed GIF animations created by the artist KidMograph/Gustavo Torres, and edited and arranged by Liz Hirsch.

Initially "Oblivius" was to have a music video, but Casablancas later stated that it was "shut down" by the band's publishers as it became "too political". "Threat of Joy" was chosen instead, and was shot by the band's frequent collaborator Warren Fu. Fu stated that the plot had been written with two days' notice, and features a tongue-in-cheek look at the failed attempt to make an "Oblivius" video as its "MacGuffin". It was released via Noisey on June 28, 2016.

A lyric video for "Oblivius" was the EP's final, and was released on July 12, 2016. Like "Drag Queen", it features vaporwave-themed GIF animations created by KidMograph/Gustavo Torres, edited and arranged by Liz Hirsch.

== Reception ==
Professional ratings
Aggregate scores
Source	Rating
Metacritic	75/100
Review scores
Source	Rating
AllMusic	4/5 stars
The Boston Globe	8/10 stars
Consequence of Sound	B
DIY	4/5 stars
Drowned in Sound	4/10
NME	4/5
Pitchfork	6/10
Whiplash	8/10 stars

Future Present Past received positive reviews, and holds a score of 75/100 on Metacritic based on six reviews, indicating a "generally favorable" response. "Mystery has forever shaped the mythology behind the Strokes, and they're rarely so forthcoming. Which is why Casablancas' peculiar transparency is one of the more alluring accomplishments," said Michael Roffman of Consequence of Sound. Barry Nicolson of NME added that, "Perhaps the highest compliment you could pay this EP is that if you didn't know who it was and had no preconceived notions about what it should—or shouldn't—sound like, you'd think you had stumbled across something very special indeed."

== Track listing ==
Future Present Past track listing
No.	Title	Writer(s)	Length
1.	"Drag Queen"	Julian Casablancas, Fabrizio Moretti, Nick Valensi	4:33
2.	"Oblivius"	Casablancas, Albert Hammond Jr.	5:00
3.	"Threat of Joy"	Casablancas	4:24
4.	"Oblivius" (Moretti Remix)	Casablancas, Hammond Jr.	5:30
Total length:			19:27

== Personnel ==
Credits adapted from EP liner notes.

The Strokes

- Julian Casablancas – vocals
- Albert Hammond Jr. – guitar, keyboards
- Nick Valensi – guitar, keyboards
- Nikolai Fraiture – bass guitar
- Fabrizio Moretti – drums, percussion

Production

- Gus Oberg – production (1–3), mixing (1 and 3)
- Ben Baptie – mixing (2)
- Dave Kutch – mastering
- Phil Joly – engineering
- Chris Tabron – engineering, additional mixing
- Fabrizio Moretti – remix (4)

Design

- Max Krance – cover
- Liz Hirsch – layout and design

== Charts ==
Chart performance for Future Present Past
Chart (2016)	Peak position
France (SNEP)	144
France Top 100 (SNEP)	60
