= Walking Shapes =

US musical group

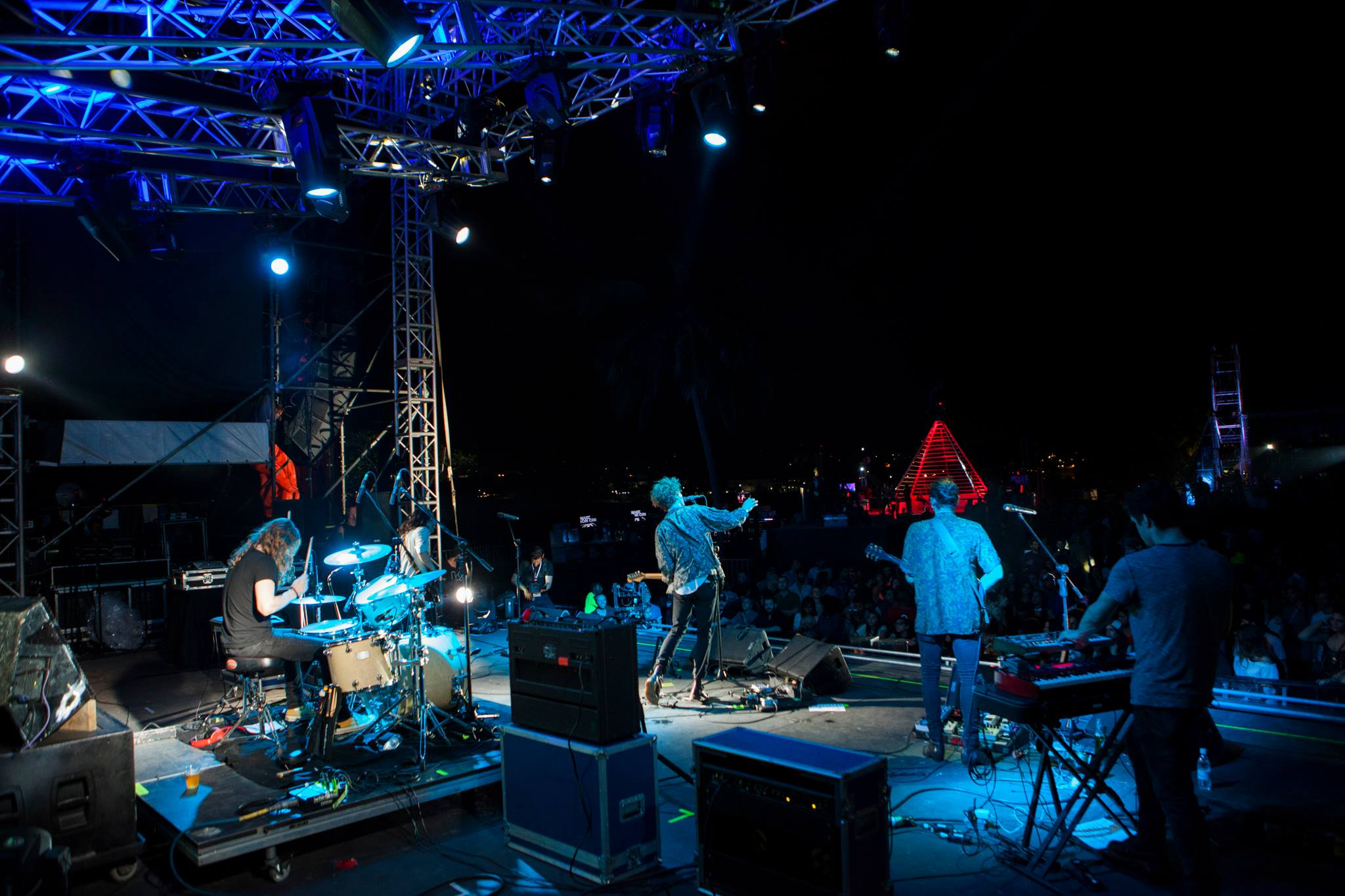

Background information
- Origin: New York City
- Genres: Rock, indie rock, indie pop
- Years active: 2012–present
- Label: No Shame/Mishu 2013–2015
- Members: Nathaniel Hoho; Jesse Kotansky; Dan Krysa; Christopher Heinz; Jake Generalli

Walking Shapes is a five-piece rock band from New York City.

== Background ==
The band formed in late 2012 by Nathaniel Hoho (lead vocals, guitar); Jesse Kotansky (guitar, violin, backup vocals); Dan Krysa (bass, backup vocals); Christopher Heinz (drummer); and Jake Generalli (Keyboardist). They released their first EP Mixtape Vol. 1 through record label No Shame in July 2013. The quintet then took up residence at NYC clubs Pianos and Baby's All Right. On April 8, 2014, the band released their debut EP Taka Come On, an album that was recorded in SoHo with producer Gus Oberg (The Strokes, Willie Nelson, and Ryan Adams). The band played 24 shows in 24 hours throughout New York City on April 24, 2014 to coincide with the official release of Taka Come On. The band has also received radio airplay on the BBC 6 with their song 'Feel Good' and 'Winter Fell.' In 2015, Walking Shapes' song "Feel Good" won the award for "Indie/Alt. Rock" category at The 14th Annual Independent Music Awards.

In 2015 The band has toured internationally, playing alongside artists such as The 1975, The Strokes’ Albert Hammond Jr., Chromeo, Run the Jewels, The Temper Trap, and Leon Bridges.

== Discography ==
=== LPs ===
- Taka Come On

=== EPs ===
- Mixtape (Vol. 1)

=== Singles ===
- "Pusher"
- "Keep"
- "Horse"
- "Woah Tiger"
- "Winter Fell"
- "Feel Good"

== Awards and nominations ==
=== The 14th Annual Independent Music Awards ===
The 14th Annual Independent Music Awards
Category	Genre	Artist	Title of Work
Song	Indie/Alt. Rock	Walking Shapes	"Feel Good"
