= Comedown Machine =

Studio album by the Strokes
- Released: March 26, 2013
- Recorded: October 2011 – January 2013
- Studios: Electric Lady (New York City); One Way (Upstate New York)
- Genres: Indie rock; new wave; post-punk revival; synth-pop
- Length: 39:55
- Label: RCA
- Producer: Gus Oberg

The Strokes chronology
Angles (2011)	Comedown Machine (2013)	Future Present Past (2016)

Singles from Comedown Machine
- 1. "One Way Trigger" Released: January 25, 2013; 2. "All the Time" Released: February 19, 2013

Comedown Machine is the fifth studio album by American rock band the Strokes. It was released on March 26, 2013, through RCA Records. The band decided to pull a media blackout for the album, with no television appearances, interviews, photoshoots, live shows, or tours. The cover artwork was designed to resemble an old RCA tape reel box.

Comedown Machine received mostly positive reviews from critics, and was placed at number 41 on the NME's list of the "50 Best Albums of 2013".

== Promotion and release ==
Before the release of the album the song "One Way Trigger" was released as a free download and was made available for streaming via YouTube and SoundCloud, and as a free download via the band's official website on January 25, 2013. Julian Casablancas posted a stylized lyric sheet for the song, designed by long-time collaborator Warren Fu, on his official website on January 30, 2013. "All the Time" was released as a digital download on February 19, 2013 and later released as a 7-inch single on April 20, 2013 and contained "Fast Animals" as the B-side.

== Reception ==
Professional ratings
Aggregate scores
Source	Rating
AnyDecentMusic?	6.2/10
Metacritic	68/100
Review scores
Source	Rating
AllMusic	4/5 stars
The A.V. Club	B
Consequence of Sound	C+
Entertainment Weekly	C−
The Guardian	3/5 stars
The Independent	3/5 stars
NME	8/10
Pitchfork	6.1/10
Rolling Stone	3/5 stars
Spin	6/10

=== Critical ===
Media response to Comedown Machine was generally favorable; the aggregating website Metacritic reports a weighted average rating of 68%, based on 44 reviews. "Whether you're in an Is This It vortex or not, this is The Strokes and they've returned with their most thought-provoking, strange and sexiest record yet," said Kieran Mayall of Clash magazine. James Skinner of BBC Music added, "Although plenty of the group’s signature sounds are present and correct, they form the backdrop to an unexpectedly wide range of styles and approaches." In contrast, Rob Sheffield of Rolling Stone questioned why Comedown Machine was "an official Strokes album instead of another Casablancas solo album." The record's sound drew comparisons to 1980s acts including OMD, New Order, Echo & the Bunnymen, The Police, and Devo.

=== Commercial ===
Without much promotional effort, Comedown Machine entered the UK Albums Chart at No. 10 but became the band's first album not to debut within the top three. The album did, however, give the band their fifth consecutive appearance in the top ten. Likewise, it reached No. 10 in the US with an entry sales week of 41,000 copies, the band's weakest performance since Is This It in 2001.

== Track listing ==
All tracks are written by the Strokes (Julian Casablancas, Nikolai Fraiture, Albert Hammond Jr., Fabrizio Moretti, Nick Valensi).

Comedown Machine track listing
No.	Title	Length
1.	"Tap Out"	3:42
2.	"All the Time"	3:01
3.	"One Way Trigger"	4:02
4.	"Welcome to Japan"	3:50
5.	"80's Comedown Machine"	4:58
6.	"50/50"	2:43
7.	"Slow Animals"	4:20
8.	"Partners in Crime"	3:21
9.	"Chances"	3:36
10.	"Happy Ending"	2:52
11.	"Call It Fate, Call It Karma"	3:24
Total length:		39:55

Japanese edition bonus track
No.	Title	Length
12.	"Fast Animals"	3:43
Total length:		43:38

== Personnel ==
The Strokes

- Julian Casablancas – vocals
- Albert Hammond Jr. – guitar, keyboards
- Nick Valensi – guitar, keyboards
- Nikolai Fraiture – bass guitar, double bass on "Call It Fate, Call It Karma"
- Fabrizio Moretti – drums, percussion

Production

- Gus Oberg – producer, audio mixer, engineer
- Phil Joly – engineer
- Dave Kutch – mastering

Design

- Brett Kilroe – art direction, design
- Fab Moretti – art direction
- Tina Ibañez – design
- Colin Lane – original band photography
- Jason McDonald – still life photography

== Charts ==
Chart performance for Comedown Machine
Chart (2013)	Peak position
Australian Albums (ARIA)	7
Austrian Albums (Ö3 Austria)	21
Belgian Albums (Ultratop Flanders)	31
Belgian Albums (Ultratop Wallonia)	49
Canadian Albums (Billboard)	17
Danish Albums (Hitlisten)	27
Dutch Albums (Album Top 100)	42
Finnish Albums (Suomen virallinen lista)	48
French Albums (SNEP)	17
German Albums (Offizielle Top 100)	50
Irish Albums (IRMA)	9
Italian Albums (FIMI)	31
Japanese Albums (Oricon)	9
Mexican Albums (AMPROFON)	10
New Zealand Albums (RMNZ)	18
Norwegian Albums (VG-lista)	10
Portuguese Albums (AFP)	18
Scottish Albums (Official Charts)	10
Spanish Albums (Promusicae)	16
Swedish Albums (Sverigetopplistan)	28
Swiss Albums (Schweizer Hitparade)	16
UK Albums (Official Charts)	10
US Billboard 200	10
US Top Alternative Albums (Billboard)	3
US Top Rock Albums (Billboard)	3
US Indie Store Album Sales (Billboard)	1

== Certifications ==
Region	Certification	Certified units/sales
United Kingdom (BPI)	Silver	60,000^{‡}
^{‡} Sales+streaming figures based on certification alone.
