= Melodies on Hiatus =

Studio album by Albert Hammond Jr.
- Released: June 23, 2023
- Genre: Rock
- Length: 67:33
- Label: Red Bull
- Producer: Gus Oberg

Albert Hammond Jr. chronology
Francis Trouble (2018)	Melodies on Hiatus (2023)

Melodies on Hiatus is the fifth solo album by American musician Albert Hammond Jr., released through Red Bull Records on June 23, 2023. The first nine tracks were released ahead of the full album on May 9, along with lead single "100–99" featuring rapper GoldLink.

== Background ==
Hammond Jr. worked on the album with Canadian songwriter Simon Wilcox, who wrote lyrics for the "folder of about 30 songs, fully fleshed out, except for the words" Hammond sent to her. Although they did not meet in person, they spoke at length on phone calls about their lives. Hammond Jr. said he felt the album "has a story, an arc" and called it "the best collection of music that [he] ha[s] made", stating that he was not "trying to make a double album; [he] wanted to make a deconstruction of a band". The album's cover features the 1926 painting Several Circles by Wassily Kandinsky.

== Critical reception ==
Professional ratings
Aggregate scores
Source	Rating
Metacritic	77/100
Review scores
Source	Rating
DIY	3/5 stars
Evening Standard	4/5 stars
NME	4/5 stars
Pitchfork	6.6/10

Melodies on Hiatus received a score of 77 out of 100 on review aggregator Metacritic based on four critics' reviews, indicating "generally favorable" reception. Erica Campbell of NME wrote that the tracks "showcase the wealth of the guitarist's talent and influence" and "having Wilcox transmute Hammond Jr's auditory ramblings into lyricism works well". Campbell concluded that while the album "may seem meandering at times", it "lands where it needs to be". David Smyth of the Evening Standard found there to be "plenty here to prove that Hammond can still fire out sharp, melodious guitar lines with ease" and "its breadth, compared to the 35 minutes of its punkier predecessor Francis Trouble, means that he can get away with experiments that would sound stranger on a tighter collection". Lisa Wright of DIY called Melodies on Hiatus "undoubtedly a mixed bag when it comes to the calibre of earworms contained within" and despite some highlights (like the "warmly infectious" track "818" and "the distinctly Strokes-y melancholy" of "Dead Air"), remarked that "there's an innate quality control filter missing here". Stephen Thomas Erlewine, reviewing the album for Pitchfork described it as a "cheerfully sprawling double album that feels less like a cohesive statement than a clearinghouse of ideas" as well as "essentially a pop album, a collection of brightly alluring confections that's full of gilded arena-rock guitars, retro synth sounds, and high-gloss effects".

== Track listing ==
Melodies on Hiatus track listing
No.	Title	Length
1.	"100–99" (featuring GoldLink)	3:36
2.	"Downtown Fred"	4:25
3.	"Old Man"	3:33
4.	"Darlin'"	3:52
5.	"Thoughtful Distress" (featuring Matt Helders and Steve Stevens)	3:40
6.	"Libertude"	3:55
7.	"Memo of Hate"	3:25
8.	"Home Again"	3:43
9.	"I Got You"	3:26
10.	"Caught by Night"	3:52
11.	"Dead Air"	3:15
12.	"One Chance"	3:47
13.	"Remember" (featuring Rainsford)	0:29
14.	"818"	3:56
15.	"Fast Kitten"	4:12
16.	"I'd Never Leave"	3:17
17.	"Never Stop"	3:16
18.	"False Alarm"	4:00
19.	"Alright Tomorrow" (featuring Rainsford)	3:54
Total length:		67:33
