= Thin Lizard Dawn =

American rock band

- Origin: New York City
- Genres: Alternative rock, Indie rock
- Years active: 1990s
- Label: RCA
- Past members: Greg Lattimer; Howie Statland; Ken Fermaglich; Mike Gagliardi; Dave Berk

Thin Lizard Dawn were a 1990s American rock group from New York City who released two major label albums on RCA Records in the late 1990s. They are probably most widely known for their first CD release, Thin Lizard Dawn, which was released in 1996, that featured the single "Sexual Dynamo", in addition to the song "Sucks" ridiculing Oasis. The band's label however, had difficulty marketing the band and dropped them after the release of their second album.

== History ==
Thin Lizard Dawn was formed in the early 1990s when all four members were students at Skidmore College in Saratoga Springs, New York, and they later relocated to Manhattan. Mike Gagliardi replaced original bassist Ken Fermaglich.

Cover of 1996 self-titled debut of Thin Lizard Dawn

The band was signed to RCA Records in late 1995, who released two albums. Thin Lizard Dawn was released in late 1996. It featured the single "Sexual Dynamo", as well as the song "Sucks" ridiculing Oasis. Babysue reviewed the album and called it "one of the strongest debut discs I have ever heard", and described its sound as "techno-bubblegum," meaning "extremely upbeat and catchy, but the lyrics have an obtuse quality that transcend mere pop." On the other hand, Stephen Thomas Erlewine of allmusic gave the album a negative review, that while sometimes the "group makes a hook hit home with their brute force," most of the album "is simply style over substance, and someone else's style, at that."

Their follow-up album, Go, was released in October 1999, with "Get It" designated as the first single. They disbanded in 2000.

Two of the band's songs, "Weed" and "Under the Wing", were used in the 2000 film Cruel Intentions 2.

== Afterwards ==
Howie Statland went on to form the band NYC Smoke. He is the current owner of Rivington Guitars in New York City.

Greg Lattimer formed HotSocky. He has also done producing, including the 2006 album Yours to Keep by Albert Hammond Jr.

Mike Gagliardi played bass for Davey La, and recorded albums as Mikki James. Mike died March 4, 2021, in Springfield, Massachusetts.

Dave Berk plays multiple instruments and is a music producer, and has led bands that have appeared at the Anguilla and Philippine Jazz Festivals. He also founded Brooklyn based property management company www.prorealtyusa.com in 2005 and his team manages over 800 units across the NYC Metro Region.

Original bassist Ken Fermaglich moved into the business side of music, working with The Agency Group in New York.

== Discography ==
- Thin Lizard Dawn (1996)

1. What Did I Do
2. Sexual Dynamo
3. Killing Charlie
4. Happy/Loonies
5. Anesthesia
6. Pop Life
7. Say What You Want
8. Weed
9. Space
10. Power Intro
11. Power Ballad
12. Sucks
13. Heavily Addicted

- Go (1999)

1. Get It
2. Summer Song
3. Gettin' a Piece
4. Soda Pop & Lemonade
5. Thrill Ride
6. Sleep
7. Ooh
8. New Kid
9. Kiddies & The Ravers
10. Messages
11. Turn Yourself In
12. Under Dina Vinga (Under the Wing)
13. Passengers on Planet Earth

- For Faces and Places (limited release)
