= Street Safari =

Studio album by Public Access T.V.
- Released: Feb 23, 2018
- Studio: The CRC, New York City
- Genre: Indie rock, post-punk, new wave
- Length: 42:02
- Label: Cinematic
- Producer: Patrick Wimberly

Public Access T.V. chronology
Never Enough (2016)	Street Safari (2018)

Professional ratings
Aggregate scores
Source	Rating
Metacritic	83/100 link
Review scores
Source	Rating
AllMusic	4/5 stars
NME	4/5 stars
DIY Magazine	4/5 stars
MOJO	8/10
Q Magazine	4/5 stars
The Guardian	3/5 stars
Line of Best Fit	8/10 stars
The Guardian	}
Record Collector	}
Clash	4/5 stars

Street Safari is the second studio album by American band Public Access T.V. The album was released on 23 February 2018 via Cinematic. Several singles and music videos were released prior the album, including "MetroTech" and "Lost in the Game". The album received critical acclaim. The band supported it by several tours of the United States and Europe.

== Track listing ==
No.	Title	Length
1.	"Safari (In My Head)"	3:11
2.	"Shell No. 2"	3:28
3.	"Your God and Mine"	3:33
4.	"Metrotech"	3:35
5.	"Told You Too Much"	4:30
6.	"Rough Boy"	3:22
7.	"Lost in the Game"	3:53
8.	"Wait It Out"	4:05
9.	"Meltdown"	3:44
10.	"Ain't No Friend of Mine"	3:37
11.	"The Quicksands"	4:59
Total length:		42:02
