= Saint Solitude =

American rock band

- Origin: Asheville, NC
- Years active: 2006–
- Labels: Alive & Well Records
- Members: Dup Crosson

Saint Solitude is an American rock band formed in 2006 in Asheville, NC. Songwriter and multi-instrumentalist Dup Crosson is the only consistent member, with lineups changing from year to year after the project toured as a one-man looping act from 2007 to 2009.

Saint Solitude has released two EPs and five studio albums. In 2010, the band's debut album Journal of Retreat was released via Alive & Well Records to modest media attention in the Southeast. By Some Great Storm followed in 2011, also released by Alive & Well Records. After becoming a free agent in 2012, Crosson moved back to his native Maine where he self-released A Crack in the Snow Mortar in 2013 and Flux Camoufleurs, Volume I, a collection of instrumentals, in 2015. In 2017 he released Soul Song Paralytic, the project's fifth album, as part of a multimedia collaboration with the Oakland, CA visual artist Dara Lorenzo.

Saint Solitude is now based in Berkeley, CA.

== Other work ==
Over the years, Crosson has played with numerous bands in Asheville, NC, Maine, and Oakland, CA, including The Late Greats, The Cardinal Heart, Noise in Print, To All Of My Dear Friends, Her Ruined Majesty, CHRY, Absentia, To The Wedding, and The Bribes.

In 2005, Crosson helped write and performed on several tracks from Luke Rathborne's debut album, After Dark. The two were introduced by a common friend years before and played together in the band Decker in high school.

In 2014, he played drums for Aly Spaltro's project Lady Lamb on a support tour for Typhoon (Spaltro and Crosson worked at the same DVD store in Brunswick, ME).

== Soul Song Paralytic ==
After the death of a close friend and fellow musician in 2015, Crosson began writing the project's first concept album specifically about grief. During the writing process he recruited the visual artist Dara Lorenzo to make a visual exhibit alongside the resulting album. The album and collaboration, Soul Song Paralytic, premiered in Oakland, CA in October 2017, with Saint Solitude playing its first live show in over 5 years. Crosson and Lorenzo opened the show again at the Lottie Rose House (part of Tom Franco's Firehouse Art Collective) in December 2017 and plan to do further phases of the show in 2018.
