= Nightbox =

- Origin: Wicklow, Ireland
- Genres: Dance-punk, Indietronica, Electropop
- Years active: 2009–2014
- Members: Jacob Alexander; Nicolas Amadeus; James Tebbitt; Andrew Keyes; James Shelly
- Website: nightbox.ca

Nightbox were a dance-punk band originally from Wicklow, Ireland. The five-piece consisted of Toronto-born brothers Jacob Alexander (vocals) and Nicolas Amadeus (drums), and Irishmen Andrew Keyes (bass), James Tebbitt (lead guitar), and James Shelly (synthesizers).

The band recorded their self-titled debut EP (released February 2011), produced by MSTRKRFT's Al-P and Death From Above 1979's Sebastien Grainger. Following the EP's success, they signed with Ryan Gentles of New York's Wiz Kid Management (The Strokes) and began touring in earnest.

== History ==
Nightbox formed in Wicklow, Ireland after meeting at St. Gerard's School in Bray. The group's brothers, Jacob and Nick formed their first band with classmates James Shelly and James Tebbitt, "The Trotskies"; a project that culminated in their first record of original songs. Upon graduating from St. Gerard's, Nick and James Shelly went to study at the University of North Carolina at Chapel Hill (UNC). During that time, Jacob and James Tebbitt enlisted Andrew Keyes, changed the band's name to Nightbox and continued playing music through secondary school, going through various drummers and arrangements. In July 2009, the band made their debut appearance at Ireland's largest music festival (60,000+ attendees), Oxegen, Ireland. The festival's sponsor, Heineken Music Ireland, ranked Nightbox's performance in the Top-3 of the entire festival, out of hundreds of acts, claiming Nightbox to be their new favourite Irish band. In January 2010, after Nick and James Shelly graduated from UNC and Jacob, James Tebbitt and Andrew graduated from St. Gerard's, the band relocated to Toronto, Canada to record for a year.

The five-piece released their debut EP in February 2011, produced by Sebastien Grainger (Death From Above 1979) and Al–P (MSTRKRFT). Critical and commercial reaction to the band's eponymous debut was noteworthy on a world scale. The music video for single "Pyramid" earned heavy rotation on Canadian music television stations, debuting on MuchMusic's The Wedge program. The track was also released as part of French label Kitsuné's Maison No. 11 Compilation. "Pyramid" was chosen by NME as a Top-10 download, who acclaimed it "takes on a fresh sound of its own". UK's Dazed & Confused Magazine said "(Pyramid) takes a hedonistic approach with high energy results on a new breed of dance." The EP was re-released in Japan in September 2011 on Rallye Label, selling out 1,000 copies on its initial offering.

Prominent Irish blogger, Nialler9, stated "All signs point to Nightbox as the most likely successors to Two Door Cinema Club's worldwide ubiquity". In August 2011, Nightbox made their debut appearance in the UK, with a headlining tour which included plays at Reading & Leeds Festivals. They also earned a slot at Ireland's Electric Picnic Festival where BBC exclaimed, "The glitchy synths and the guitars sound delightful... and by jove do they know how to write a hook", rating the performance an impressive 8/10.

Nightbox have directly supported acts including Death From Above 1979 at their reunion, homecoming Toronto show in October 2011; Ellie Goulding; North-by-Northeast Music and Film Festival (NXNE) headliners Devo (July 2011); The Jesus and Mary Chain; Cults and Diamond Rings. From November 2011 – March 2012, Nightbox toured across Canada, Ireland and the UK supporting fellow Canadian artist Lights. Nightbox remixed Lights' single "Toes", released as an official bonus track on the iTunes Deluxe Edition of her second album Siberia. In January 2013, Nightbox remixed Satellite Stories' "Helsinki Art Scene", released as part of the Finnish band's Singles Remixed EP.

A debut album slated for the spring of 2013 did not materialize. In February 2014, the group announced The Panic Sequence EP would be released on 22 April 2014 on Rare Beef Records. Following the release of this EP, the group disbanded to pursue new projects.

== Appearances ==
• "Relocate You" featured on MTV's Season One Premier of The Inbetweeners (USA). The track has also appeared on MTV's The Pauly D Project and in Season 4 of USA Network's In Plain Sight. The "Relocate You" music video, produced and directed by Kheaven Lewandowski earned heavy rotation on Much Music and MuchMore Music directly following its release in January 2012.

• "Pyramid" featured on French record label Kitsune's Maison Compilation #11 and Gildas Kitsune: Club Night Mix. The track also appeared on MTV's The Inbetweeners (USA), Season 1, Episode 2, and featured on the Official Urban Outfitters' "Music Mondays" playlist.

• "Bears" featured on the television series Degrassi Season 11, Episode 25.

== Releases ==
=== EPs ===
Year	Album	Track Listing
2011	Nightbox EP: Self-released	1. "Pyramid"; 2. "Fumes"; 3. "Relocate You"; 4. "Bears"
2011	Nightbox EP (Japan Edition): Released on Rallye Label (Japan)	1. "Pyramid"; 2. "Fumes"; 3. "Relocate You"; 4. "Bears; 5. "Sister"; 6. "Pyramid (Hidden Cat Remix)"; 7. "Pyramid (Total Warr Remix)"; 8. "Utopia (Live)"
2014	The Panic Sequence EP: Released on Atria Music/Rare Beef	1. "Burning"; 2. "The Panic Sequence"; 3. "In The Rural"; 4. "Wonderworlds"; 5. "Wash"

=== Singles ===
Year	Title	EP
2011	"Pyramid"	Nightbox EP; Nightbox EP (Japan Edition)
2012	"Relocate You"	Nightbox EP; Nightbox EP (Japan Edition)

=== Remixes ===
Year	Artist	Track	Album	EP
2011	Lights	"Toes"	Siberia (Deluxe Edition) – iTunes Pre-order	
2013	Satellite Stories	"Helsinki Art Scene"		Singles Remixed EP
