= Como Te Llama =

Como Te Llama (Spanish for "What Do They Call You") may refer to:

- ¿Cómo Te Llama?, a 2008 album by Albert Hammond Jr.
- "Como Te Llama", a song from the 2021 compilation Slime Language 2
