= Francis Trouble =

Studio album by Albert Hammond Jr.
- Released: March 9, 2018
- Genres: Indie rock, garage rock, post-punk revival
- Length: 35:42
- Label: Red Bull
- Producer: Gus Oberg

Albert Hammond Jr. chronology
Momentary Masters (2015)	Francis Trouble (2018)	Melodies on Hiatus (2023)

Singles from Francis Trouble
- 1. "Muted Beatings" Released: February 2, 2018; 2. "Far Away Truths" Released: February 16, 2018; 3. "Set to Attack" Released: March 2, 2018

Francis Trouble is the fourth solo album by Albert Hammond Jr. released on March 9, 2018, through Red Bull Records. The album is named after Hammond's twin brother Francis who his mother miscarried in 1980 and was described as "a homage to both the death of his twin and his own birth, as well as the complexities of identity that arise because of their intermingling."

It was announced alongside the release of the single "Muted Beatings", which was described by NME as "optimising Hammond’s knack for huge guitar-pop hooks but laden with intricacies aplenty."

== Critical reception ==
Professional ratings
Aggregate scores
Source	Rating
Metacritic	73/100
Review scores
Source	Rating
AllMusic	4/5 stars
Clash	6/10
DIY	4/5 stars
The Line of Best Fit	7.5/10
NME	4/5 stars
Pitchfork	7.2/10
PopMatters	8/10
Rolling Stone	2.5/5 stars

Francis Trouble received generally favorable reviews according to Metacritic who assigned the album an average score of 73, based on 11 critics. Critics praised the album's energy and its "emphasis on melody and propulsion above all else."

Many also praised the inspiration from a wide amount of different genres including on the song 'Screamer' described by NME as "frenetic surf-rock." However, others were critical towards the album with Rolling Stone criticizing its short length and describing it as forgettable.

== Track listing ==
Francis Trouble track listing
No.	Title	Writer(s)	Length
1.	"DvsL"		2:58
2.	"Far Away Truths"	Albert Hammond Jr. & Tyler Parkford	3:38
3.	"Muted Beatings"	Hammond Jr, Parkford & Jennifer Decilveo	3:17
4.	"Set to Attack"		3:28
5.	"Tea for Two"	Hammond Jr & Parkford	4:09
6.	"Stop and Go"		3:53
7.	"ScreaMER"		2:31
8.	"Rocky's Late Night"		4:17
9.	"Strangers"		3:44
10.	"Harder, Harder, Harder"		3:47
Total length:			35:42

== Personnel ==
Credits taken from AllMusic

Musicians

- Albert Hammond Jr. – vocals, guitar
- Hammarsing Kharhmar – guitar
- Colin Killalea – guitar, saxophone
- Jordan Brooks – bass guitar
- Jeremy Gustin – drums

Additional personnel

- Gus Oberg – producer, mixing
- Joe LaPorta – mastering engineer
- Liz Hirsch – design, illustrations
- Kenny "Tick" Salcido – A&R

== Charts ==
Chart performance for Francis Trouble
Chart (2018)	Peak position
US Heatseekers Albums (Billboard)	6
US Independent Albums (Billboard)	25
