= The Virgins =

American indie rock/punk band

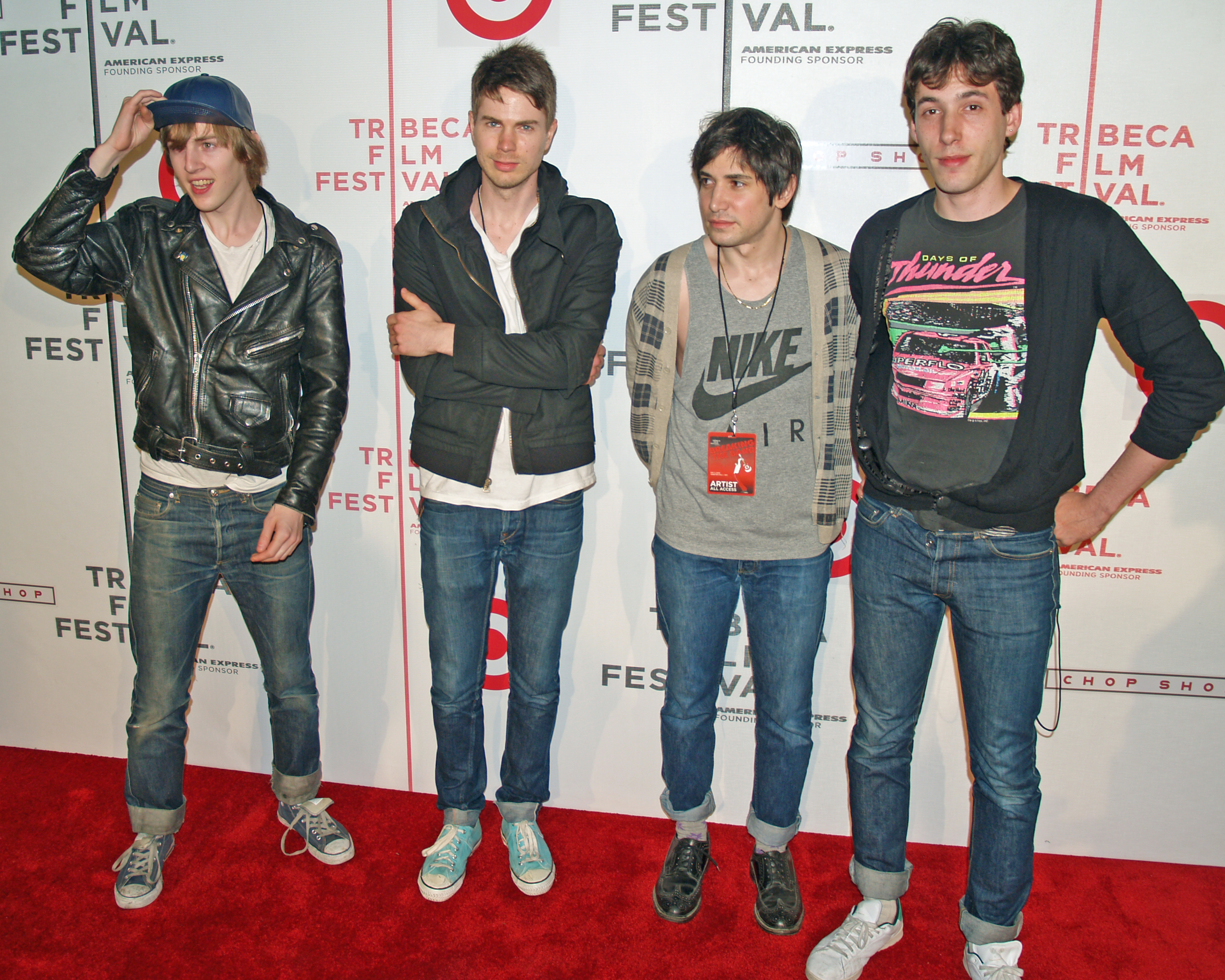
- The Virgins at the 2008 Tribeca Film Festival. From left to right: Wade Oates, Eric Ratensperger, Nick Ackerman, Donald Cumming

Background information
- Origin: New York City, New York, US
- Genres: Indie rock; post-punk revival; new wave; dance-punk
- Years active: 2007–2013
- Labels: aNYthing; Atlantic; Cult
- Past members: Donald Cumming; Wade Oates; Nick Ackerman; Eric Ratensperger; John Eatherly; Xan Aird; Max Kamins

The Virgins were an American indie rock band formed in 2006 in New York City. The band split up in November 2013.

== History ==
=== 2006–2007: Formation ===
Frontman Donald Cumming began writing music by himself in his New York apartment. He then recruited friends to fill out the band.

Almost immediately they made a five-song EP titled The Virgins '07, compiled of the band's early recordings, and songs Donald had already recorded himself. Upon completion, Cumming passed out the EP to friends and DJs causing the music to pervade the New York club scene. Soon after, the demo came across Atlantic Records who signed Cumming before the band was fully formed. The band's debut LP came out in 2008 and the band toured for several years following its release with their tour manager, former Fashion Director of Vice (magazine) Aviva Yael.

=== 2008–2011: The Virgins ===
Their first album titled The Virgins was met with mixed success critically. To promote the record they played at the All Points West Festival, SXSW festival, Lollapalooza, Glastonbury, Leeds, Reading, and T in the Park festivals, among other major French, German, Norwegian, Swedish, Dutch, Spanish, and Italian festivals in the summer of 2009. In the fall of 2009 they were invited to perform in Moscow.

The song "Rich Girls" was number 68 on Rolling Stone's list of the 100 Best Songs of 2008 (although no sequential order was intended).

=== 2012–2013: Strike Gently and break-up ===
In 2012, the band announced their return with an all new line-up backing leader Donald Cumming. The band also announced that it signed with the new record label Cult Records, founded by Julian Casablancas of The Strokes. In March 2013 The band released their new album Strike Gently worldwide.

The band supported the album with several US tours as well as touring South America and Europe.

Additionally, in support of the new album, the band made their second appearance on NBC’s Late Night with Jimmy Fallon, performing the track "Wheel of Fortune".

In April 2013, it was announced that The Virgins would be joining The Killers on tour in May for a series of special shows, including a date at NYC's Madison Square Garden on May 14.

On November 13, 2013, Cumming announced that the band had split. In an interview that day with Rolling Stone, Cumming said that he will now start working on a solo record. The band's planned Europe tour for 2014 was cancelled as well.

After the break up, John Eatherly and Xan Aird founded the NYC band Public Access T.V.

Bass guitarist Nick Zarin-Ackerman died on March 30, 2017.

== Discography ==
Studio albums

- The Virgins (June 3, 2008, Atlantic Records)
- Strike Gently (March 12, 2013, Cult Records)

Extended plays

- The Virgins '07 (2007)

Singles

- Venus in Chains w/ Slave to You (May 26, 2012, Glassine Box)

== Members ==
- Donald Cumming - lead vocals
- Wade Oates - lead guitar, backing vocals
- Nick Zarin-Ackerman - bass guitar, backing vocals
- Erik Ratensperger - drums
- Xan Aird - lead Guitar
- Max Kamins - bass guitar
- John Eatherly - drums

== Appearance ==
In the 2010 action comedy film Cop Out, the daughter of James "Jimmy" Monroe (Bruce Willis) was planning a wedding and wanted The Virgins to play at the wedding, saying they were a little bit edgy.
