= The Virgins '07 =

EP by The Virgins
- Released: October 9, 2007
- Genre: Indie rock; dance-punk
- Length: 17:42
- Label: aNYthing
- Producer: Jason Hill

The Virgins chronology
The Virgins '07 (2007)	The Virgins (2008)

The Virgins '07 is the debut extended play (EP) by American indie rock band The Virgins, released on October 9, 2007 by aNYthing. It was produced by Jason Hill. The entire EP was used as a soundtrack for the November 14, 2007 episode of the teen drama television series Gossip Girl, titled "Seventeen Candles".

AllMusic noted it as "well-received."

== Track listing ==
1. "Rich Girls" – 3:44
2. "Love Is Colder than Death" – 3:24
3. "Fernando Pando" – 4:13
4. "Radio Christiane" (demo) – 2:42
5. "One Week of Danger" (demo) – 3:39
