= On Desire =

Studio album by Drowners
- Released: June 24, 2016
- Recorded: Spring 2016
- Genre: Indie rock
- Length: 37:26
- Label: Frenchkiss
- Producer: Claudius Mittendorfer

Drowners chronology
Drowners (2014)	On Desire (2016)

Professional ratings
Aggregate scores
Source	Rating
Metacritic	59/100
Review scores
Source	Rating
Allmusic	3/5 stars
Clash	6/10 stars
DIY	2/5 stars
Q	3/5 stars

On Desire is the second studio album by the indie rock band Drowners, released on June 24, 2016.

== Track listing ==
All tracks are written by Matthew Hitt

No.	Title	Length
1.	"Troublemaker"	2:41
2.	"Cruel Ways"	3:24
3.	"Human Remains"	3:51
4.	"Someone Else Is Getting In"	3:58
5.	"Dreams Don't Count"	3:34
6.	"Conversations With Myself"	4:42
7.	"Trust The Tension"	4:00
8.	"Another Go"	3:13
9.	"Pick Up The Pace"	4:19
10.	"Don't Be Like That"	3:44

== Personnel ==
The following individuals were credited for mastering and producing the album.

- Steve Fallone — Mastering
- Claudius Mittendorfer — Engineer, Mixing, Producer
- Erik Lee Snyder — Artwork
