= New Skin (CRX album) =

Studio album by CRX
- Released: October 28, 2016
- Genres: Hard rock; stoner rock; industrial rock; power pop; pop rock; garage rock; desert rock; new wave
- Length: 30:32
- Label: Columbia
- Producer: Josh Homme

CRX chronology
New Skin (2016)	Peek (2019)

Singles from New Skin
- 1. "Ways to Fake It" Released: September 7, 2016; 2. "Broken Bones" Released: October 20, 2016

New Skin is the debut studio album by American rock band CRX. It was released on October 28, 2016. Lead singer, Nick Valensi has described the album's sound as a mix of power pop and heavy metal, and has named The Cars, Cheap Trick and Elvis Costello as influences.

== Reception ==
Professional ratings
Aggregate scores
Source	Rating
Metacritic	69/100
Review scores
Source	Rating
Consequence of Sound	(C+)
NME	4/5 stars
DIY	4/5 stars
The Observer	2/5 stars

New Skin received positive reviews, and currently holds a score of 69/100 on Metacritic based on nine reviews, indicating a "generally favourable" response.

== Track listing ==
All tracks are written by Nick Valensi, except where noted.

No.	Title	Lyrics	Music	Length
1.	"Ways to Fake It"	Valensi, Richie Follin		2:59
2.	"Broken Bones"			3:31
3.	"Give It Up"			3:52
4.	"Anything"			3:27
5.	"Walls"	Valensi, Daniel Davies		2:38
6.	"Slow Down"	Valensi, Darian Zahedi		4:06
7.	"On Edge"	Valensi, Jon Safley, Zahedi	Valensi, Safley, Zahedi	1:53
8.	"Unnatural"			2:27
9.	"One Track Mind"			2:51
10.	"Monkey Machine"			2:48
Total length:				30:32

== Personnel ==
Credits adapted from LP liner notes.

CRX

- Nick Valensi – vocals & guitar
- Jon Safley – bass
- Darian Zahedi – guitar
- Richie Follin – keyboard
- Ralph Alexander – drums

Additional personnel

- Joshua Homme – production
- Andrew Scheps – mixing
- Jon Theodore – drums (tracks 1 & 4)
- Justin Hergett – mixing assistant
- Mark Rankin – engineering
- Gus Oberg – additional engineering
- Dan Dixon – additional engineering
- Andrew Chavez – additional engineering
- Gavin Lurssen – mastering
- Boneface – cover art
- Warren Fu – art design and direction
- Gerard Uht – Special thanks, editing/packaging
