= Satellite Stories =

Finnish indie pop band

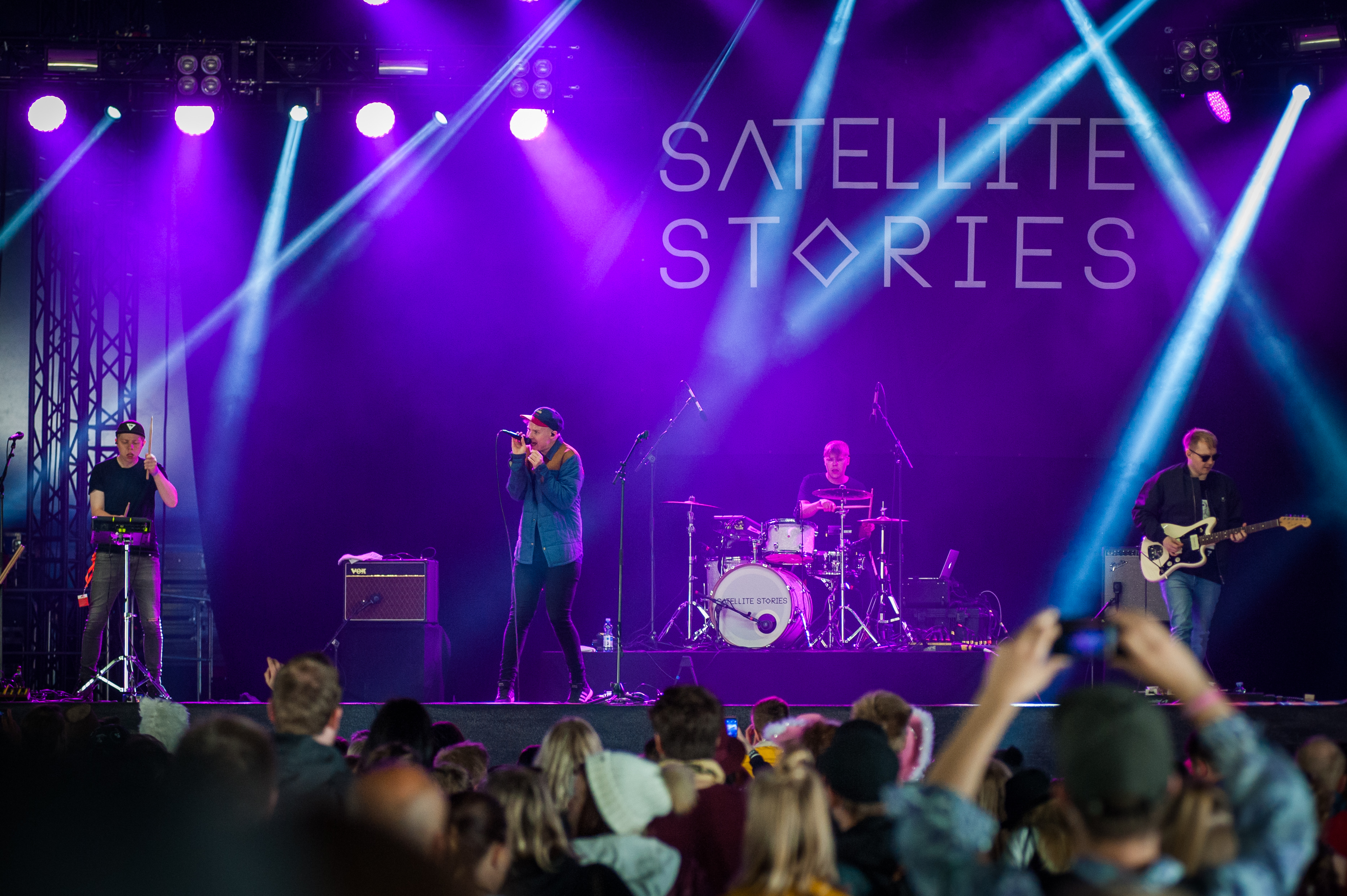
- Satellite Stories at the 2017 Ilosaarirock festival.

Background information
- Origin: Oulu, Finland
- Years active: 2008–2018
- Labels: Universal; XYZ Berlin Soliti
- Members: Esa Mankinen; Marko Heikkinen; Jyri Pesonen; Olli-Pekka Ervasti
- Website: satellitestories.com

Satellite Stories was a Finnish indie pop band from Oulu, formed in 2008. Satellite Stories is the most well known Finnish indie band in Europe. The band consists of Esa Mankinen (vocals, rhythm guitar), Marko Heikkinen (lead guitar), Jyri Pesonen (bass guitar) and Olli-Pekka Ervasti (drums). The band's debut album, Phrases to Break the Ice, was released on 21 September 2012 by independent record label XYZ Berlin and licensed throughout the world. In late 2012, the band made a publishing deal with major publishing company BMG. In the beginning of 2013 they were signed to X-ray Touring for bookings.

The band's music and live performance have been praised by British music magazines and medias NME, Q, Clash, MTV UK and The Fly. In August 2012, they were the 2nd most blogged artist in the world according to the Hype Machine. In September 2013, their single "Campfire" made no.1 of Hype Machine's most blogged chart.

The band released their second studio album, Pine Trails, in late 2013. In August 2014, the band started to record their third album in the UK with producer Barny Barnicott. Barnicott has previously worked with Arctic Monkeys, The Temper Trap and Editors. Their third album "Vagabonds" was released in March 2015, and received a five-star review from the largest newspaper in Finland.

== Tours ==
The band has toured Europe and Japan extensively since 2012, and has appeared at 18 festivals over the summer of 2013. These include Lowlands Festival (Netherlands), Flow Festival (Finland), Hultsfred Festival (Sweden), Arenal Sound Festival (Spain) and Dot to Dot Festival (England).

In Spring 2014, the band sold out their shows in London (Old Blue Last) and in Berlin (Kantine am Berghain). The band also performed at Club NME in London. In the summer of 2014, the band played their first festival headline slots in Spain (Arenal Sound Festival) and in Germany. The festival shows also included shows at Zürich Open Air Festival in Switzerland and FM4 Frequency Festival in Austria.

In Spring 2015, the band sold out their London show a month in advance of the Vagabonds album release tour.

The band has also played live in BBC London, Dutch 3FM and Spanish Radio 3.

== Band members ==
- Esa Mankinen – vocals, rhythm guitar
- Marko Heikkinen – lead guitar
- Jyri Pesonen – bass guitar
- Olli-Pekka Ervasti – drums

== Discography ==
=== Albums ===
Year	Album	Peak positions
Year	Album	FIN
2012	Phrases to Break the Ice	40
2013	Pine Trails	–
2015	Vagabonds	34
2017	Young Detectives	–
2018	Cut Out the Lights	43

=== EPs ===
- Promo EP (2010)
- Scandinavia EP (2012)
- Singles Remixed EP (2013)

=== Singles ===
- Arrest me- (Demo)
- Family (2011)
- Blame the Fireworks (2011)
- Anti-lover (2012)
- Sirens (2012)
- Kids Aren't Safe in the Metro (2013)
- Scandinavian Girls (2013)
- Campfire (2013)
- Australia/Lights Go Low (2014)
- Season of B-Sides (2014)
- The Trap (2014)
- Heartbeat (2015)
- Campus (2015)
- Miracle (2016)
- Confetti (2017)
- Chameleon (2017)
