= Strike Gently =

Studio album by The Virgins
- Released: 12 March 2013
- Genre: Indie rock
- Length: 43:56
- Label: Cult Records
- Producer: Gus Oberg & Johnny T Yerington

The Virgins chronology
The Virgins (2008)	Strike Gently (2013)

Professional ratings
Aggregate scores
Source	Rating
Metacritic	70/100
Review scores
Source	Rating
NME	8/10 stars
Entertainment Weekly	B+
Music OMH	(3.5/5)

Strike Gently is the second and final studio album by New York City band The Virgins. The album was released on 12 March 2013 on Cult Records.

== Track listing ==
No.	Title	Length
1.	"Prima Materia"	4:00
2.	"Wheel of Fortune"	3:42
3.	"Flashbacks, Memories, and Dreams"	4:14
4.	"Figure on the Ice"	4:56
5.	"Impressions of You"	3:58
6.	"What Good is Moonlight"	3:16
7.	"Travel Express (From Me)"	4:50
8.	"The Beggar"	4:35
9.	"Amelia"	4:54
10.	"Blue Rose Tattoo"	5:35
Total length:		43:56

== Recording ==
"The 10 track album was recorded at the East Village Recording Center by Johnny T Yerington and Gus Oberg as Unicorn Parade. All art direction by Warren Fu and cover photo by Frank Fu."

== Personnel ==
- Donald Cumming – lead vocals
- Xan Aird – lead guitar, backing vocals
- Max Kamins – bass, backing vocals
- John Eatherly – drums, percussion
