= The Virgins (album) =

Studio album by The Virgins
- Released: June 3, 2008
- Recorded: 2008
- Studios: Fresh Kills, NYC
- Genre: Dance-punk
- Length: 34:11
- Label: Atlantic
- Producers: S*A*M, Sluggo

The Virgins chronology
The Virgins '07 (2006)	The Virgins (2008)	Strike Gently (2013)

Singles from The Virgins
- 1. "Private Affair" Released: February 14, 2008; 2. "Teen Lovers" Released: February 16, 2009; 3. "Rich Girls" Released: May 13, 2009

Professional ratings
Aggregate scores
Source	Rating
Metacritic	67/100
Review scores
Source	Rating
AllMusic	3.5/5 stars
Blender	2.5/5 stars
Entertainment Weekly	B+
NME	7/10
Rolling Stone	4/5 stars
Slant	3.5/5 stars
Spin	3.5/5 stars

The Virgins is the first full-length album by The Virgins. It was released June 3, 2008. Many songs on the album firsg appeared on their first EP, The Virgins '07. "Private Affair" was chosen as the first single for the album. The song "Hey Hey Girl" was used in the trailer for the movie Miss March, while the song "Rich Girls" was used in the movie 17 Again, in the trailer for She's Out of My League, an episode of Castle (Ghosts) and in a Rugby Ralph Lauren fall 2010 promotional lifestyle film. The songs "One Week of Danger", "Rich Girls", "Fernando Pando", "Radio Christiane", and "Love is Colder Than Death" were also used in the TV show Gossip Girl in the episode "Seventeen Candles". The song "Hey Hey Girl" also appears in The Vampire Diaries in season one episode eighteen.

== Track listing ==
All tracks are written by The Virgins.

No.	Title	Length
1.	"She's Expensive"	2:51
2.	"One Week of Danger"	2:45
3.	"Rich Girls"	3:02
4.	"Teen Lovers"	2:12
5.	"Fernando Pando"	4:17
6.	"Murder"	3:09
7.	"Hey Hey Girl"	3:12
8.	"Private Affair"	2:49
9.	"Radio Christiane"	2:42
10.	"Love is Colder Than Death"	7:12
Total length:		34:11

iTunes Version
No.	Title	Length
11.	"Fast Times"	2:01

== Charts ==
The album was listed for 14 weeks on the France Albums Top 150. It entered the chart on position 102 on week 40/2008, and its last appearance was on week 14/2009. It peaked on number 71, where it stayed for one week.

Chart (2008)	Peak position
France (French Albums Chart)	71
