= Momentary Masters =

Studio Album by Albert Hammond Jr. in July 13, 2015

Studio album by Albert Hammond Jr.
- Released: July 31, 2015
- Genre: Indie rock, post-punk revival, garage rock, new wave
- Length: 35:43
- Label: Vagrant, Infectious
- Producer: Gus Oberg

Albert Hammond Jr. chronology
AHJ (2013)	Momentary Masters (2015)	Francis Trouble (2018)

Singles from Momentary Masters
- 1. "Born Slippy" Released: July 8, 2015; 2. "Losing Touch" Released: July 14, 2015

Professional ratings
Review scores
Source	Rating
AllMusic	4/5 stars
Consequence of Sound	C
The Guardian	3/5 stars
NME	7/12
Pitchfork Media	7.3/10
Rolling Stone	3/5 stars
Under the Radar	7.5/10 stars

Momentary Masters is the third solo studio album by American musician Albert Hammond Jr. released on July 31, 2015.

== Track listing ==
All songs written by Albert Hammond Jr. except "Don't Think Twice", by Bob Dylan.

No.	Title	Length
1.	"Born Slippy"	4:04
2.	"Power Hungry"	3:47
3.	"Caught By My Shadow"	3:03
4.	"Coming to Getcha"	3:26
5.	"Losing Touch"	3:55
6.	"Don't Think Twice (Bob Dylan cover)"	4:36
7.	"Razors Edge"	3:05
8.	"Touché"	3:04
9.	"Drunched in Crumbs"	2:56
10.	"Side Boob"	3:47
Total length:		35:43

== Personnel ==
Personnel taken from Momentary Masters liner notes.

- Albert Hammond Jr. – guitar, vocals
- Mikey Freedom Hart – lead & rhythm guitars
- Hammar Sing – lead & rhythm guitar
- Jordan Brooks – bass
- Jeremy Gustin – drums

Production

- Gus Oberg – producer, engineer
- Gosha Usov – 2nd engineer
- Ben Baptie – mixing engineer
- Dave Kutch – mastering
- Lizzie Nanut – art direction
- Jason McDonald – photography
