= AHJ (EP) =

2013 extended play by Albert Hammond Jr.

EP by Albert Hammond Jr.
- Released: October 8, 2013
- Recorded: Albert's studio, Broome St., Manhattan; One Way Studios, upstate New York
- Genre: Indie rock, post-punk revival, garage rock
- Length: 14:53
- Label: Cult Records
- Producer: Gus Oberg

Albert Hammond Jr. chronology
¿Cómo Te Llama? (2008)	AHJ (2013)	Momentary Masters (2015)

Singles from AHJ
- 1. "St.Justice" Released: October 2, 2013; 2. "Carnal Cruise" Released: November 1, 2013; 3. "Strange Tidings" Released: January 26, 2014

Professional ratings
Review scores
Source	Rating
Consequence of Sound	C+
NME	6/10
Pitchfork Media	6.8/10
PopMatters	7/10 stars
AllMusic	link

AHJ is an extended play by American singer-songwriter, Albert Hammond Jr. The EP is produced by frequent The Strokes collaborator, Gus Oberg, and was recorded in Hammond's Broome St., Manhattan studio, as well as One Way Studios in upstate New York. It was released on October 8, 2013, and comprises five songs (though non-Cult Web Store digital versions omit "Carnal Cruise"). Hammond Jr. toured in support of the EP from October 2013 to 2014.

== Track listing ==
No.	Title	Length
1.	"St. Justice"	3:03
2.	"Strange Tidings"	3:39
3.	"Carnal Cruise" (*only available on Cult Records store)	2:43
4.	"Rude Customer"	2:23
5.	"Cooker Ship"	2:55
