= Drowners (album) =

Studio album by Drowners
- Released: January 28, 2014
- Genre: Indie rock
- Length: 28:32
- Label: Frenchkiss Records
- Producer: Gus Oberg and Johnny T. Yerington

Drowners chronology
Between Us Girls EP (2013)	Drowners (2014)	On Desire (2016)

Professional ratings
Aggregate scores
Source	Rating
Metacritic	58/100
Review scores
Source	Rating
AllMusic	2.5/5 stars
CMJ	(favourable)
The Independent	3/5 stars
musicOMH	1.5/5 stars
NME	(7/10)
Pitchfork Media	5.8/10

Drowners is the debut album by the indie rock band Drowners, released on January 28, 2014.

== Track listing ==
All tracks are written by Matthew Hitt

No.	Title	Length
1.	"Ways to Phrase a Rejection"	1:46
2.	"Long Hair"	1:48
3.	"Luv, Hold Me Down"	2:50
4.	"Watch You Change"	2:42
5.	"You've Got It All Wrong"	1:50
6.	"Unzip Your Harrington"	2:31
7.	"Pure Pleasure"	2:42
8.	"Bar Chat"	2:12
9.	"A Button on Your Blouse"	3:13
10.	"Let Me Finish"	2:31
11.	"Well, People Will Talk"	2:27
12.	"A Shell Across the Tongue"	2:00

== Personnel ==
- The Drowners - Arranger, Primary Artist
- Matthew Hitt - Composer, Guitar, Lyricist, Vocals
- Eli Janney - Mixing
- Joe Lambert - Mastering
- Gus Oberg - Producer
- Lakis E. Pavlou - Drums
- Jack Ridley III - Guitar, Vocals
- Erik Lee Snyder - Bass
- Peter Zachary Voelker - Photography
- Johnny T. Yerington - Producer

Credits adapted from AllMusic.
