= Loose Buttons =

American indie rock band

Loose Buttons are a New York City-based indie rock band. Its members include Eric Nizgretsky (singer), Zack Kantor (lead guitar), Manny Silverstein (bass), and Adam Holtzberg (drums). They have released three albums: Something Better (2020), What's On Outside (2021), and You Came To See Magic (2026) as well as two EPs: Sundays (2017) and Damage Gallery (2014) and multiple singles. Their 2024 single "I Saw Jon Hamm At The Beach" was discussed in an interview with Jon Hamm on The Kelly Clarkson Show.
