= Drowners =

American-Welsh indie rock band

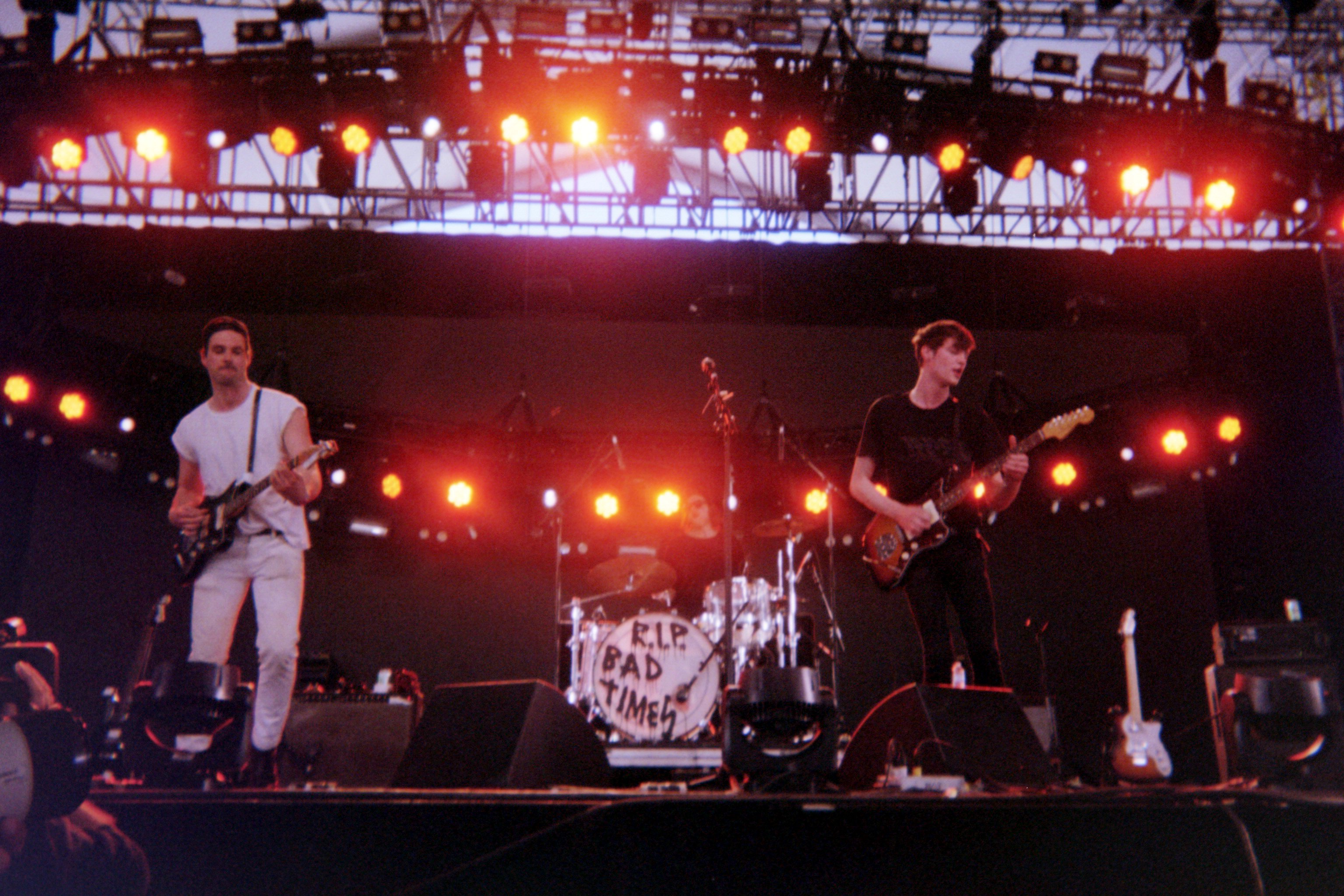
- Drowners performing at Coachella in 2014

Background information
- Origin: New York City, New York, U.S.
- Genres: Alternative rock, indie rock, post-punk revival
- Years active: 2011–2016, 2019
- Label: Frenchkiss Records
- Members: Matthew Hitt; Jack Ridley; Erik Lee Snyder; Daniel Jacobs
- Past members: Joe Brodie

Drowners were an American-Welsh indie rock band formed in New York City in 2011 by Matthew Hitt (lead vocals, guitar), Jack Ridley III (lead guitar), Erik Lee Snyder (bass) and Daniel Jacobs (drums). Their first release was the EP Between Us Girls which appeared in early 2013. In January 2014 their debut album, Drowners, was released worldwide preceded by the single "Luv, Hold Me Down". In 2016, the band released their second album, On Desire. The band has toured both North America and Europe.

== History ==
The band was formed when Welsh-born Matthew Hitt moved to New York City in 2011 to pursue a career in modelling. With a degree in English Literature, he found time to "write and jam on [his] guitar every day". He recruited three musicians and began rehearsing and recording the songs. Guitarist Jack Ridley is originally from the North West of the US while bass player Erik Snyder grew up outside Philadelphia. On February 4, 2013, Drowners released their first EP, Between Us Girls, on the English label Birthday Records. The EP contains three short songs, including "Long Hair", oft cited as the lead track.

The band signed with a Frenchkiss Records, and began to record their first studio album in May 2013. The album was produced by Gus Oberg and Johnny T, while recording took place over a three-week period. It received mixed reviews.

The band headed to Europe for the first time in February 2014 in support of their album, to perform a small number of London shows (including an in-store performance at Rough Trade East), and supported Cage The Elephant on their European tour and SKATERS on their UK tour. The band enlisted several drummers, including Joe Brodie, before settling on Daniel Jacobs.

The band opened shows for Arctic Monkeys, The Vaccines and Foals while undertaking their first headlining tour of North America and Europe in February/March 2014. They later performed at the Coachella festival and supported Temples. After two months of recording, the band had finalised their second album by Christmas 2015.

In June 2016, the band released the album On Desire to mixed reviews. It was produced by Claudius Mitterndorfer and preceded by the single "Cruel Ways".

In October 2019, Drowners returned to perform as part of FKR20, a musical event celebrating the 20th anniversary of Frenchkiss Records. The band have since not reunited as of December 2024.

== Discography ==
=== Studio albums ===
Title	Album details
Drowners	Released: January 28, 2014; Label: Frenchkiss Records; Formats: CD, digital download, vinyl
On Desire	Released: June 24, 2016; Label: Frenchkiss Records; Formats: CD, digital download

=== EP ===
- Between Us Girls (February 4, 2013, Birthday Records)
