= Soliti =

Finnish independent record label

- Founded: 2011
- Founder: Nick Triani
- Distributor: Playground Music Finland
- Genre: Alternative rock, indie rock, indie pop, shoegaze, dreampop, singer/songwriter, electronica
- Country of origin: Finland
- Location: Helsinki

Soliti is a Finnish indie record label based in Helsinki. The label was founded in 2011 by Nick Triani. Soliti is the Italian word for usual. The first artists to join the label were Astrid Swan, Big Wave Riders, Black Twig, Cats On Fire and The New Tigers.

== History ==
Triani founded Soliti in 2011 and the first record ever released through Soliti was Hits - Pavement for Girls - a collection of Pavement covers by Astrid Swan in 2011. Soliti now works with the following artists: Astrid Swan, Black Twig, Cats of Transnistria, LOVE SPORT, Oceans, The New Tigers, Puunhalaaja, olli, Verandan, Color Dolor, New Silver Girl, Ocelot, Swan/Koistinen, Pink Chameleons, Local Al Past Artists on the label include Cats on fire, Sister Flo, Satellite Stories, Manna, Prince Of Assyria, The Holy, Black Lizard and many others.

In 2016 Soliti was recognised as one of Europe's most inspiring young labels and was selected by IMPALA and The Independent Echo for the FIVEUNDERFIFTEEN campaign. In 2018 Astrid Swan won the Teosto Prize for her SOLITI released album From the Bed and Beyond which was followed up in 2019 by Color Dolor, who in turn won the prize for their album Love.

== Discography ==
- Astrid Swan, Hits (Pavement For Girls) (Soliti 001)
- Big Wave Riders, s/t EP (Soliti 002)
- The New Tigers, s/t (Soliti 003)
- Black Twig, Paper Trees (Soliti 004)
- The New Tigers, Toffee / Chocolate (Soliti 005)
- Soliti Zip (Soliti 006)
- Cats On Fire, All Blackshirts To Me (Soliti 007)
- Black Twig, The Paper Aeroplane / Kouvola (Fast) (Soliti 008)
- The New Tigers / Top Sound, Top Tigers Play New Sound (Soliti 009)
- Big Wave Riders, Life Less Ordinary (Soliti 010)
- Delay Trees, Doze (Soliti 011)
- Soliti Zip Volume 2 (Soliti 012)
- Paperfangs, Past Perfect (Soliti 013)
- Black Lizard, s/t (Soliti 014)
- Astrid Swan, In My Own House (Soliti 015)
- Soliti Turns Two, Odds, Sods & Found Sounds (Soliti 016)
- The New Tigers, The Badger (Soliti 017)
- Astrid Swan, Astrid4 (Soliti 018)
- Delay Trees, Readymade (Soliti 019)
- Prince Of Assyria, Annika (Soliti 020)
- Black Twig, Heliogram (Soliti 021)
- Soliti Zip Volume 3 (Soliti 022)
- Prince Of Assyria, Changing Places (Soliti 023)
- Gim Kordon, Ei Ole Helppoo (Soliti 024)
- Manna, Troublebirds (Soliti 025)
- Soliti Turns Three, Congratulations & Commiserations (Soliti 026)
- Black Lizard, Burning EP (Soliti 027)
- Sister Flo, Tragician's Hat Anniversary Edition (Soliti Retro 001)
- Manna, Blackbird (Soliti 030)
- Oceans, Oceans EP (Soliti 031)
- Ghost Of Jack Nance, My Heart Sings EP (Soliti 032)
- Love Sport, GOL!! EP (Soliti 033)
- Cats Of Transnistria, Away EP (Soliti 034)
- Satellite Stories, Vagabonds (Soliti 035)
- Black Lizard, Solarize (Soliti 036)
- 23:23, The Softest Wave etc. (Soliti 037)
- 23:23, Torero (Soliti 038)
- 23:23, Drifter (Soliti 039)
- Mumrunner, Full Blossom EP (Soliti 040)
- Black Twig, In League With Satan / She’s Still My Friend (Redux) (Soliti 041)
- Various Artists, Cover Me: Soliti Turns 4 (Soliti 042)
- Cats Of Transnistria, Thunder Comes b/w Ishtar/Astaroth (Soliti 043)
- Love Sport, Almost Doesn’t Mean You Made It (Soliti 044)
- 23:23, To Die On A Far Away Island (Soliti 045)
- Oceans, Thrill EP (Soliti 046)
- Puunhalaaja, Puunhalaaja (Soliti 047)
- Cats Of Transnistria, Divine (Soliti 048)
- Black Twig, Blaze On A Plain (Soliti 049)
- The New Tigers, Vindication EP (Soliti 050)
- The Duplo!, Full Speed, No Brain – The 7″ Singles Compilation (Soliti Retro 004)
- The Holy, MORE ESCHER AND RANDOM NOTES EP (Soliti 051)
- Big Wave Riders, Endless Summer (Soliti 052)
- Mumrunner, Gentle Slopes EP (Soliti 053)
- Paltsa-Kai Salama, Night At The Beach (Soliti 055)
- Love Sport, ‘Meat Moon’ b/w ‘Mary, Gary, warehouse’ (Soliti 057)
- Sonic Visions, Lost In Between EP (Soliti 058)
- Astrid Swan, From The Bed And Beyond (Soliti 059)
- Delay Trees, Let Go (Soliti 061)
- Love Sport, Dull Tracks (Soliti 062)
- olli, bye EP (Soliti 063)
- Verandan, Verandan EP (Soliti 064)
- Cats Of Transnistria, Opium (Soliti 065)
- olli, Little Death EP (Soliti 067)
- Puunhalaaja, Kari (Soliti 066)
- The New Tigers, Do Xao (Soliti 068)
- Color Dolor, Love (Soliti 069)
- The Duplo!, The Duplo! Is Rock n Roll (Soliti 070)
- New Silver Girl, New Silver Girl (Soliti 071)
- Ocelot, Mä voin ottaa sun ikävän pois (Soliti 072)
- Swan/Koistinen, Swan/Koistinen EP (Soliti 073)
