= Never Enough (Public Access T.V. album) =

Studio album by Public Access T.V.
- Released: September 30, 2016
- Studio: 2015-2016, New York City
- Genre: Indie rock, post-punk, new wave
- Length: 38:53
- Label: Cinematic
- Producer: Gus ObergJohnny T. YeringtonChili Jesson; Jeremy Ferguson; Milo Ross; Matthew Maroulakos; Vlad Holiday

Public Access T.V. chronology
Never Enough (2016)	Street Safari (2018)

Professional ratings
Aggregate scores
Source	Rating
Metacritic	84/100 link
Review scores
Source	Rating
AllMusic	4/5 stars
Classic Rock	4/5 stars
DIY	4/5 stars
The Guardian	4/5 stars
NME	8/10
Q	4/5 stars

Never Enough is the debut studio album by New York City-based band Public Access T.V. The album was released on September 30, 2016 via Cinematic. Several singles were released prior the album, including "In Love and Alone" / "Patti Peru", "On Location", "Sudden Emotion", and "End of an Era". The album has received critical acclaim, garnering four-star reviews from NME, The Guardian, Q Magazine, DIY, Classic Rock, and Dork.

Never Enough was included on both Rough Trade's and NME's lists of top albums of the year, and was also declared one of NME's 10 best debut albums of the year for 2016.

== Track listing ==
Never Enough track listing
No.	Title	Length
1.	"In Our Blood"	3:13
2.	"Evil Disco"	3:08
3.	"Summertime"	3:17
4.	"I Don't Wanna Live in California"	3:37
5.	"End of an Era"	2:47
6.	"Patti Peru"	3:29
7.	"Careful"	3:48
8.	"In Love and Alone"	2:34
9.	"Remember"	3:23
10.	"Sudden Emotion"	2:39
11.	"On Location"	3:38
12.	"Sell You on a Lie"	3:20
Total length:		38:58
