= Donald Cumming =

American singer-songwriter

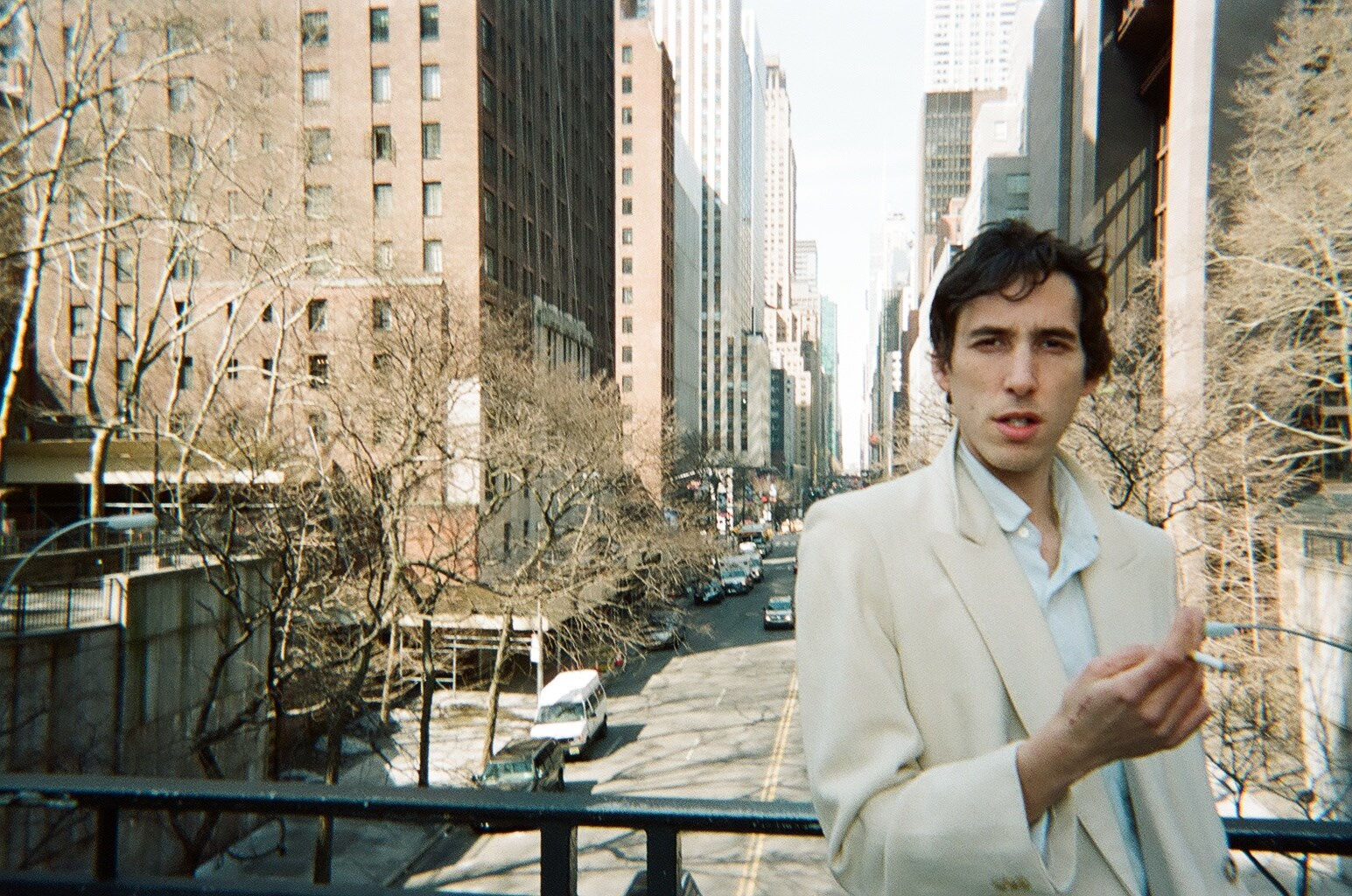

Background information
- Born: July 31, 1981 (age 45)
- Origin: New York City, United States
- Genres: Rock, post-punk, new wave
- Years active: 2007–Present
- Label: Washington Square Music

Donald Cumming (born July 31, 1981) is an American actor, musician, singer and songwriter. He is best known as the lead singer of the New York City band The Virgins. After two albums, the band announced their split in 2013.

Cumming's first solo album Out Calls Only was released on June 16, 2015. His solo career has been acclaimed by Rolling Stone, The Wall Street Journal, NME, The Guardian, Rolling Stone Germany, Paste and Entertainment Weekly.

== Musical career ==
=== The Virgins ===
The Virgins were a rock band formed in New York City by Donald from 2006 to 2013. Original band members included Nick Zarin-Ackerman, Wade Oates and Erik Ratensperger. They signed to Atlantic Records to release their first full-length, self-titled album The Virgins. The song “Rich Girls” was on Rolling Stone’s list of 100 Best Songs of 2008. In 2012, the band returned, signing with Julian Casablancas’, of The Strokes, label Cult Records. In March 2013, they released their album Strike Gently.

The Virgins made multiple national and international tours, opened for The Killers, Iggy Pop and The Stooges, Lou Reed, Sonic Youth, Patti Smith, Kenneth Anger, and more. Their early tours were documented by tour manager Aviva Yael, who used some of the images for a book entitled "No Regrets" published by Hachette Books in 2008. They have also made television appearances on the Late Show with David Letterman, Late Night with Conan O’Brien, Late Night with Jimmy Fallon, and Last Call with Carson Daly.

=== Solo career ===
His first major performance as a solo artist was at the 2014 Bonnaroo Music Festival.

Cumming was later featured in Richard Hell's artist series "Night Out with Richard Hell. The event was held at the New York City Symphony Space, and was a two hour conversation between Hell and Cumming that touched upon; music, art, and film."

Cumming released his debut solo album Out Calls Only on June 16, 2015 with the single, "Game of the Heart" on Washington Square Music. British newspaper The Guardian described it as a carefully constructed period piece, and rated it three stars. NME listed it under 8 Great Albums That May Have Passed You By This Week and was rated eight stars by the music magazine. Since his album release, Donald has opened for both Brandon Flowers and The Killers.

== Acting career ==
In 2006, Cumming starred in the short film "Bug Crush". The film went on to win the Short Filmmaking Award at the Sundance Film Festival. He also appeared in Fall Out Boy's "Sugar We're Going Down" music video
