= ¿Cómo Te Llama? =

Studio album by Albert Hammond Jr.
- Released: Digital: June 17, 2008
- Recorded: October 25–November 30, 2007
- Studio: Electric Lady Studios
- Genres: Indie rock, post-punk revival, garage rock, baroque pop, folk rock, folk pop
- Length: 46:30
- Labels: Black Seal (US); Rough Trade (UK)
- Producer: Albert Hammond Jr.

Albert Hammond Jr. chronology
Yours to Keep (2006)	¿Cómo Te Llama? (2008)	AHJ (2013)

Professional ratings
Review scores
Source	Rating
AbsolutePunk.net	(83%) link
Allmusic	link
NME	(8/10) link
Pitchfork	(6.7/10) link
Rolling Stone	link
Spin	link
Uncut	link

¿Cómo Te Llama? is the second solo album by Albert Hammond Jr. The album has 13 tracks and was released on July 7, 2008 in the UK and on July 8, 2008 in the US. "GfC" is the first single from the album, and it premiered on iLike on May 22, 2008.

On 27 May 2008, Hammond released "GfC" on iTunes in the US. The song had already been played extensively live on his 2007 tour, along with "In My Room". A non-album B-side "& So it Goes" was released along with the single.

The title ¿Cómo Te Llama? is Spanish for "How does [he/she/it] call you?" rather than "What is your name?" (¿Cómo te llamas?).

== Production ==
On August 29, 2007, Albert Hammond Jr. announced on his MySpace blog he was recording his second album. He recorded for five weeks in Electric Lady Studios in New York City with his band of Josh Lattanzi on bass (of Ben Kweller and The Lemonheads), and Matt Romano (The Strokes' drum technician) on drums. Marc Philippe Eskenazi (guitar, Medium Cool, The Mooney Suzuki), who toured with Hammond, played on the album according to an interview with Pitchfork. Steve Schlitz, from the band Longwave also plays on the album and Sean Lennon plays the piano on the song, "Spooky Couch". The album is produced by Hammond himself along with engineer Gus Oberg and drummer Matt Romano. String personnel are Earl Maneein (of Resolution15), Matt Szemela, Jon Weber and Jessie Reagen.

== Track listing ==
All tracks are written by Albert Hammond Jr.

No.	Title	Length
1.	"Bargain of a Century"	3:10
2.	"In My Room"	3:18
3.	"Lisa"	3:46
4.	"GfC"	3:09
5.	"The Boss Americana"	2:57
6.	"Rocket"	3:35
7.	"Victory at Monterey"	3:58
8.	"You Won't Be Fooled By This"	3:01
9.	"Spooky Couch"	7:18
10.	"Borrowed Time"	3:11
11.	"G Up"	2:40
12.	"Miss Myrtle"	3:06
13.	"Feed Me Jack Or: How I Learned to Stop Worrying and Love Peter Sellers"	2:52

Japanese bonus tracks
No.	Title	Length
14.	"And So We Go"	2:42
15.	"C of Stoney"	4:16
16.	"Bathroom Time"	3:20

=== Special Edition with Live DVD ===
1. In My Room (Live)
2. Everyone Gets A Star (Live)
3. Bright Young Thing (Live)
4. Call An Ambulance (Live)
5. In Transit (Live)
6. Holiday (Live)
7. Blue Skies (Live)
8. 101 (Live)
9. Scared (Live)
10. Hard To Live In The City (Live)
11. Outro (Live)

recorded @ Bowery Ballroom || running time: 36 minutes

== Personnel ==
Personnel taken from ¿Cómo Te Llama? liner notes.

- Albert Hammond Jr. – vocals, guitar
- Marc Philippe Eskenazi – guitar, keyboards, vocals
- Josh Latanzi – bass, vocals
- Matt Romano – drums, percussion

Additional musicians

- Sean Lennon – piano
- Earl Maneein – violin
- Matt Szemela – violin
- Jon Weber – viola
- Jessie Reagan – cello

Production

- Albert Hammond Jr. – production, mixing
- Gus Oberg – co-production, engineering, mixing
- Matt Romano – co-production, mixing
- Greg Calbi – mastering
- Charlie Stavish – assistant engineering
- Brett Kilroe – art direction
- Valérie Jodoin-Keaton – photography

== Chart performance ==
Chart (2008)	Peak position
French Albums Chart	168
UK Albums Chart	183
US Billboard 200	145
US Billboard Top Heatseekers	5
US Billboard Independent Albums	20
