= Luke Rathborne =

American musician from Maine (born 2011)

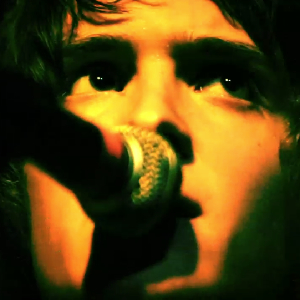
Photo of Luke Rathborne

Luke Rathborne is an American musician from Maine who currently lives in New York City. He was featured on BBC 6 Music as a discovery of BBC 6 Music D.J. Lauren Laverne.

In November 2008, Rathborne was featured in Interview magazine under their 'Discovery Artists' of the year.

== Biography ==
Rathborne got his start by moving to New York City when he was 18 years old. His debut album, After Dark recorded when he was 17 years old started gaining the attention of figures in the music business, the first individual to discover Rathborne was Joey Levine, a songwriter of tin-pan alley fame who penned "Yummy Yummy Yummy" among others. He decided to produce several songs for Rathborne and brought him to music industry figures eventually attracting management to Rathborne's Career.

In 2011, Rathborne was signed to Los Angeles independent label, Dilettante and Australian label, Speak N' Spell Records and released a double EP, Dog Years/I Can Be One. The record was self-released by Rathborne in the U.K. on his own label, True Believer. It gained much attention in the U.K. and prompted an appearance on Lauren Laverne's programme on BBC Radio 6 Music and appearances in the NME, leading to a slot playing before 30,000 at SXSW and embarking on several US tours. The record featured two separate sides of different music representing two sides of the artist.

== After Dark ==
Rathborne's first album, After Dark was recorded when he was 17 years old. Rathborne has stated in interviews in order to record the album he would have to sneak into a recording studio at night at a local college in his town, pretending to be doing a radio show at the college radio station, WBOR, and going in to record through the night. The record was completed without the knowledge of the local college, and was engineered and produced by Rathborne himself, who learned to use the studio without assistance.

== England ==
Upon visiting the U.K. Rathborne caught the attention of BBC 6 Music DJ Lauren Laverne, who personally offered to bring Rathborne on her show, after another guest, ironically Noah and the Whale singer had called out sick. Rathborne was on tour in England and showed up to BBC Studios in London performing live on-air with his band.

In February 2011, Rathborne organized a tour through London playing a different venue in London each night for seven nights. The tour was well received and documented by The Fly magazine,

It's a day that usually fills most workers with dread, but Sunday in Stoke Newington is an altogether different affair thanks to this night that helps to segue the excesses of the weekend into the calm predictability of the working week. This week, American troubadour Luke Rathborne is the special guest at The Drop – just one of numerous performances over town. He comes bearing no gifts though and the evening kicks off an hour later than expected while the organisers struggle to find a backline and drum kit. It tends to be a simpler affair round here, you see. On record, his songs twist an engaging tale of gritty melancholy, but one that feels relatively restrained so it is a surprise when the guitars kick in and the world-weary, haunting tracks explode with such powerful force. Rathborne's voice has an old, worn quality that speaks of long roads travelled and of knowledge not expected from a 22-year-old. The comparisons to Bob Dylan and Elliott Smith are easily understood – it's raw, simple, aching – but his sparsely arranged confessionals are darkly captivating in their own right. Up above, the bar is packed with punters, all going about their evenings while down in this tiny little room, it feels like we're being let in on a secret that the rest of the world should not miss.

== Releases ==
After Dark – 2007 – Rathborne's first album, After Dark was produced and engineered by Rathborne himself at the age of 17 and recorded in hometown of Brunswick, Maine. The album features a handful of different styles and a small pressing was done on Rathborne's own label, "True Believer". This record went on to capture the attention of different individuals in New York City, prompting Rathborne's move.

I Can Be One/Dog Years EP – 2011 – In 2011 Rathborne was signed to Los Angeles independent label, 'Dilettante' and Australian label, 'Speak N' Spell Records' and released a Double E.P. Record entitled, "Dog Years/I Can Be One E.P.". The Record was self-released by Rathborne in the U.K. on his own label, 'True Believer'. It gained much attention in the U.K. and prompted an appearance on, 6 Music for the BBC and appearances in the NME, leading to an opening slot for the Strokes at SXSW. The record featured two separate sides of different music representing two sides of the artist.

SOFT - 2013 – In 2013, Rathborne launched his own new label, True Believer and started a four-piece band. In October, SOFT was released as a new sound, eventually garnering over nine million Spotify streams as an independent release and touring the US extensively with Travis and Albert Hammond Jr. in 2013. SPIN reviewed the album in 2013, "'SOFT' segues back and forth through the American underground, channeling the garage-rock sludge of Ty Segall in places (see the title track) and resurrecting the melodic charms of R.E.M. in others ('Wanna Be You')" – SPIN Magazine

== Discography ==
- After Dark (2007) self-released
- I Can Be One/Dog Years EP (2011) – Dilettante Records
- SOFT (2013) – True Believer/Dilettante
