= Yours to Keep (Albert Hammond Jr. album) =

Studio album by Albert Hammond Jr.
- Released: October 9, 2006
- Recorded: 2006
- Genre: Indie rock, post-punk revival, garage rock, folk rock, baroque pop
- Length: 34:52
- Label: Rough Trade Records(UK release); New Line Records/Scratchie Records (US Release)
- Producer: Greg Lattimer

Albert Hammond Jr. chronology
Yours to Keep (2006)	¿Cómo Te Llama? (2008)

Professional ratings
Review scores
Source	Rating
AbsolutePunk.net	(84%)
AllMusic	4/5 stars
The A.V. Club	B+
Blender	3.5/5 stars
Entertainment Weekly	B+
The Guardian	3/5 stars
NME	(8/10)
Pitchfork Media	(6.9/10)
Rolling Stone	3.5/5 stars

Yours to Keep, the debut solo album by The Strokes guitarist Albert Hammond Jr., was released October 9, 2006, in the UK through Rough Trade Records and was released in North America on March 6, 2007, through New Line Records/Scratchie Records. The first single taken from it, "Everyone Gets a Star", was released as download only, and the first full single is "Back to the 101". The album also featured help from Sean Lennon, with whom Albert had attended school at Institut Le Rosey. The album title references the eponymous track from the Guided by Voices album Bee Thousand, with the album also including a cover of their song Postal Blowfish as a bonus track.

== Track listing ==
All tracks are written by Albert Hammond Jr., except where noted; Additional lyrics by Jon Larue.

No.	Title	Writer(s)	Length
1.	"Cartoon Music for Superheroes"		2:04
2.	"In Transit"		3:33
3.	"Everyone Gets a Star"		3:05
4.	"Bright Young Thing"		3:13
5.	"Blue Skies"		3:17
6.	"Back to the 101" ("101" on the U.S. release)	Hammond Jr.; Catherine Pierce	3:27
7.	"Call an Ambulance"		3:11
8.	"Scared"	Hammond Jr.; Greg Lattimer	4:42
9.	"Holiday"		3:08
10.	"Hard to Live (In the City)"" ("Hard to Live in the City" in the U.S.)		5:23

U.S. and Canada bonus tracks
No.	Title	Length
11.	"Postal Blowfish"	2:20
12.	"Well...All Right"	2:27
13.	"101" (Enhanced CD Music Video)

== Personnel ==
- Albert Hammond Jr. – vocals, guitar; toy piano (1), drums (5)
- Matt Romano – drums (2–4, 6–10)
- Mikki James – bass (1, 3, 4), melodica (1)
- Greg Lattimer – Akai MPC (1, 4), bass (3, 4), bells (5), guitar and background vocals (8)
- Sean Lennon – piano and background vocals (6, 8), bass (2)
- Josh Lattanzi – bass (6, 7, 9, 10), guitar (2)
- Julian Casablancas – bass and background vocals (8)
- Chris Feinstein – bass (8)
- Roger Greenawalt – ukulele on "Call an Ambulance"
- Greg Glassman – trumpet (10)
- Evan Robinson – trombone (10)
- Alex Levy – shakers (10)

=== Production ===
- Greg Lattimer – producer
- Gus Oberg – engineer

== Chart performance ==
Chart (2006)	Peak position
French Albums Chart	186
Swedish Albums Chart	48
UK Albums Chart	74
US Billboard 200	117
US Billboard Top Heatseekers	2
US Billboard Independent Albums	11
