= Public Access T.V. (band) =

American band

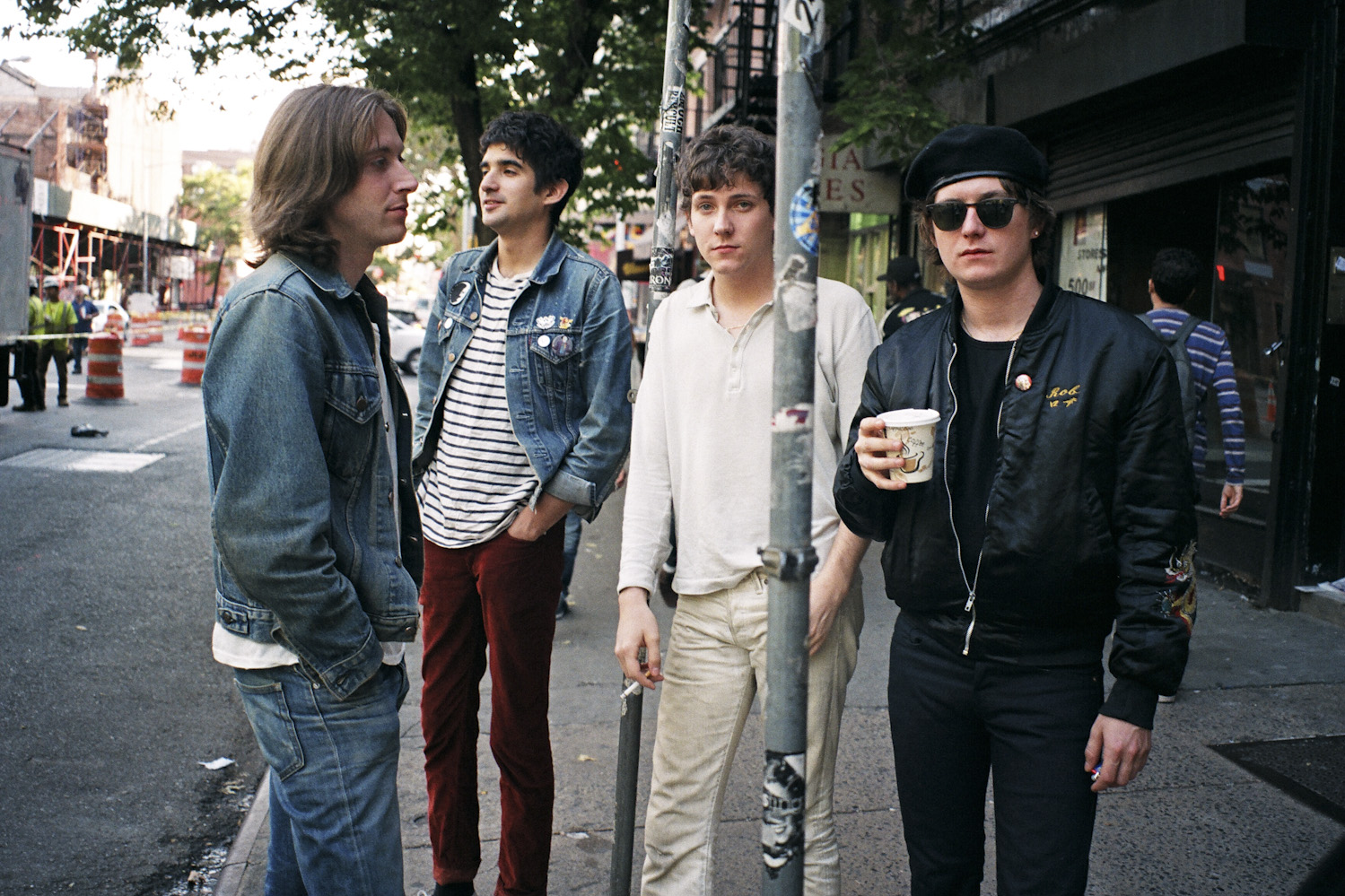

Background information
- Origin: New York City, United States
- Genres: Rock, post-punk, new wave
- Years active: 2014–2019
- Label: Cinematic / Sony Records
- Members: John Eatherly; Xan Aird; Max Peebles; Peter Sustarsic
- Website: www.PATVMusic.com

Public Access T.V. were an American band formed in New York City in 2014.

The group has supported notable acts such as The Pixies, Weezer, The Killers, Kings of Leon, and others. They have also received critical acclaim from Rolling Stone, The New York Times, Fader, Zane Lowe, The Guardian, USA Today, NME, BBC, and other outlets.

The band's East Village loft exploded in the 2015 East Village gas explosion.

== History ==
Frontman John Eatherly dropped out of high school at the age of 16 to pursue music full-time. For the next several years he played in various projects as a hired musician (most notably as one of the drummers of Nashville garage punk band, be your own PET) and wound up in New York City. He eventually began working on his own songs and formed "Public Access TV".

When the group put their first ever track "Monaco" online in January 2014, the song immediately received praise from various music publications including NME, who called the group 'New York's Hottest New Band'. The group gave their first ever live performance later that month, it was held in New York and was sold-out.

That spring, the band headed to the UK where they performed a series of secret warm-up concerts under fake names in preparation for their appearance at various music festivals. The band performed at the Great Escape and London Calling festivals. These performances led The Guardian to run a feature on Public Access TV and their potential to ignite a revival for New Wave music.

In November 2014, Public Access TV released their debut single "In The Mirror" in the UK to critical acclaim. To promote the song, the band returned to the UK where they did a support tour and also played their first headlining London concert.

In Spring 2015, a few days after performing at the SXSW music festival in Austin Texas, the band made worldwide news when their Manhattan apartment was completely destroyed in a gas explosion. In May 2015 the band released their 5-song EP titled "Public Access". The EP was the first release for the band available in the United States and was put out by Terrible Records. To promote the release, the band embarked on two U.S. tours, one supporting Gang of Four and the other supporting Palma Violets.

In the summer of 2015 the band announced they would be relocating for a few months to London to record their debut album and sort out their living situation after losing their loft. Frontman, John Eatherly, announced an open call for house shows while the band was in the UK. While in Europe the band also supported The Strokes at Hyde Park as well as performed at the Festival Internacional de Benicàssim in Spain and the Positivus Festival in Latvia.

In Fall of 2015 the band supported Hinds on a full US support tour and released the AA-sided single "In Love and Alone" / "Patti Peru". "In Love and Alone" was premiered by Zane Lowe on Beats 1 Radio who gave the band his stamp of approval by playing the track twice in a row. Both tracks have gone on to receive wide critical acclaim. The track was chosen by Rolling Stone magazine as one of the top 5 songs of the month.

From the winter to summer of 2016 the band finished recording their debut album as well as completed several more European tours. The band also performed at several music festivals including Governors Ball Music Festival, Bonnaroo Music Festival, and the Milan-based i-Days Festival. Public Access TV announced their debut album, Never Enough, would be released on September 30, 2016.

=== Never Enough (2016) ===
The band's debut album, Never Enough was released through Cinematic on September 30, 2016. The album was released to critical acclaim, garnering four-star reviews from NME, The Guardian and more.

Never Enough was included in both Rough Trade's and NME's lists of top albums of 2016, as well as being declared one of the top 10 debut albums of the year by NME.

To promote the album the band completed several headline North American and European tours. In March 2017, the band supported Dinosaur Jr their Canadian tour. Public Access TV also supported The Pixies on their spring 2017 American tour. In the summer and fall of 2017 the band performed at various US and EU festivals including The Meadows, Made in America, BST Hyde Park, and others.

Public Access TV supported The Killers in June 2017

=== Street Safari (2018) ===
The band's sophomore album Street Safari was released through Cinematic on February 23, 2018. The album was released to critical acclaim, garnering positive reviews from MOJO, Q, NME, The Guardian, Line of Best Fit, and others. The album was recorded with Patrick Wimberly at CRC Studios in New York.

PATV supported the album with a headline US and European tour in the winter and spring of 2018. In June 2018 they supported Julian Casablancas's band The Voidz. In August 2018 the band opened for Kings of Leon at a string of NYC shows.

The band made their TV debut performing on Action Bronson's show on VICELAND TV. The band made their international TV debut by performing live on the French TV show "Quotidien".

== Discography ==
Studio albums

- Never Enough (September 30, 2016, Cinematic/Sony)
- Street Safari (February 23, 2018, Cinematic/Sony)

EPs

- Rebounder (August 2014, Gudrun/Polydor; limited vinyl-only EP)
- Public Access EP (May 2015, Terrible/Polydor)

Singles

- "In the Mirror" (November 2014, Gudrun/Polydor)
- "In Love and Alone" w/ "Patti Peru" (November 2015, Terrible)
