= CRX (band) =

American rock band

- Origin: Los Angeles
- Genres: stoner rock; indie rock; industrial rock; power pop; Alternative Rock; garage rock; desert rock; new wave
- Years active: 2013–present
- Label: Columbia
- Spinoff of: Guards; People On People; The Rondelles; The Strokes; The Willowz
- Members: Ralph Alexander; Brad Oberhofer; Jon Safley; Nick Valensi; Darian Zahedi
- Past members: Richie Follin
- Website: www.crxmusic.com

CRX is an American rock band formed in Los Angeles in 2013, consisting of Nick Valensi (lead vocals, guitar), Ralph Alexander (drums), Brad Oberhofer (keyboard, backing vocals), Jon Safley (bass, backing vocals) and Darian Zahedi (guitar, backing vocals). The band released their debut album, New Skin, on October 28, 2016. The album's first single, "Ways to Fake It", was released on September 7, 2016 through Vevo and Spotify. Valensi has described the band's sound as a mix of power pop and heavy metal, and has named The Cars, Cheap Trick and Elvis Costello as influences.

== Band members ==
Current members

- Nick Valensi – lead vocals, lead guitar (2013–present)
- Darian Zahedi – rhythm guitar (2015–present)
- Brad Oberhofer – keyboard, backing vocals (2018–present)
- Jon Safley – bass guitar, synth/synth bass, percussion, backing vocals (2014–present)
- Ralph Alexander – drums, percussion (2015–present)

Former members

- Richie Follin – keyboard, guitar, backing vocals (2013–2018)

== Discography ==
=== Albums ===
- New Skin (2016)
- Peek (2019)

=== EPs ===
- Interiors (2024)

=== Singles ===
- "Ways to Fake It" (2016)
- "Broken Bones" (2016)
- "Love Me Again" (2018)
- "We’re All Alone" (2019)
- "Falling" (2019)
- "Get Close" (2019)
