= Albert Hammond Jr. =

American musician (born 1980)

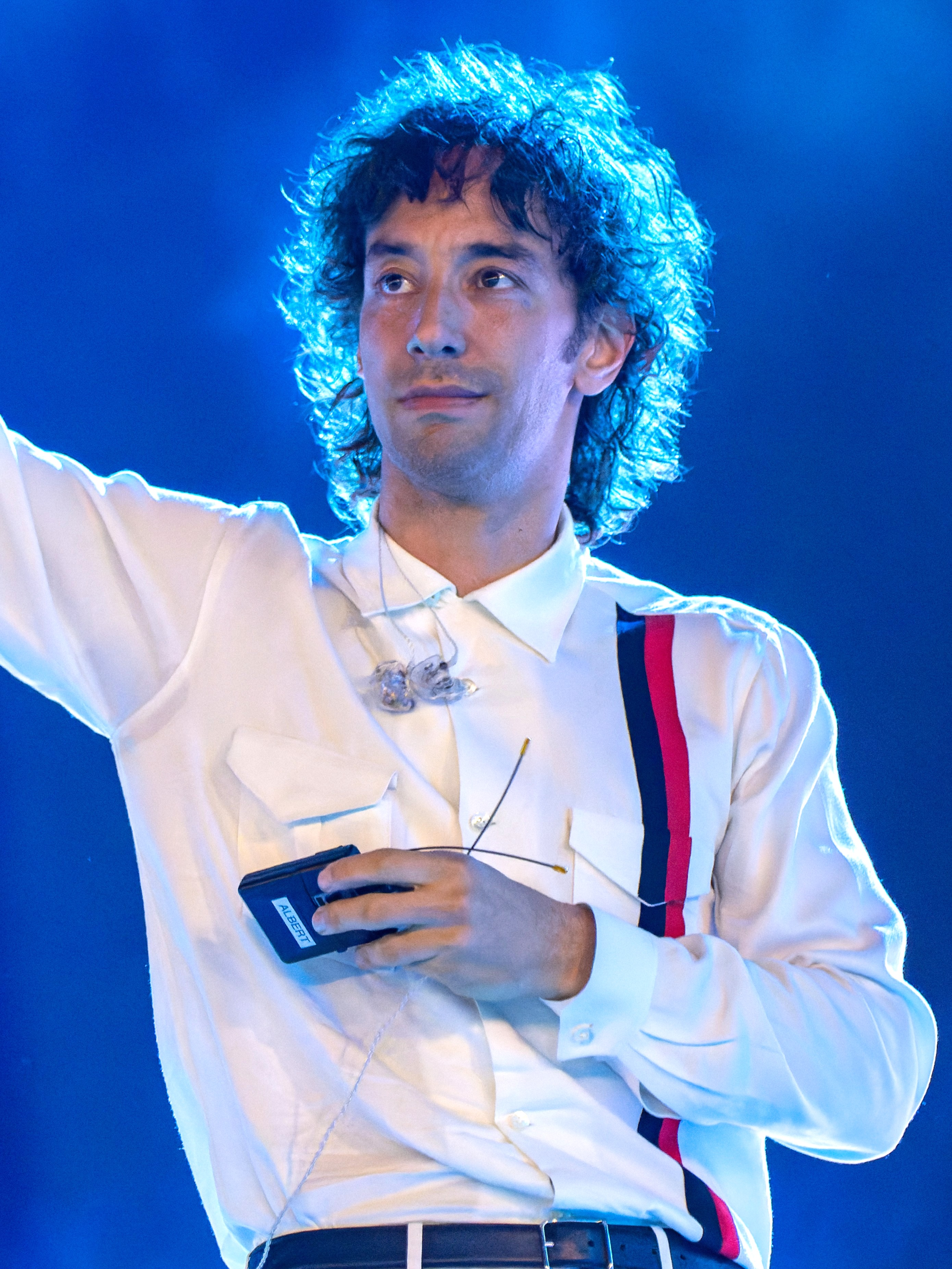
- Hammond in 2022
- Born: April 9, 1980 (age 46); Los Angeles, California, U.S.
- Occupations: Musician; singer; songwriter
- Spouse: Justyna Sroka (m. 2013; div. 2023)
- Children: 2
- Family: Albert Hammond (father)
- Musical career
- Genres: Indie rock; garage rock; post-punk revival; new wave; baroque pop; folk rock
- Instruments: Guitar; vocals; keyboards
- Years active: 1999–present
- Labels: Vagrant; Infectious; Cult; Red Bull Records; RCA; BMG Gold; Rough Trade; New Line; Scratchie; Black Seal
- Member of: The Strokes
- Website: alberthammondjr.com

Albert Hammond Jr. (born April 9, 1980) is an American musician who is a member of the rock band the Strokes. He is best known for his role as the guitarist and occasional keyboard player and backing vocalist for the band. Hammond has released extensive solo work, including five solo albums.

Born in Los Angeles, Hammond is a first-generation American, his father the songwriter Albert Hammond being of British-Gibraltarian descent, and his mother being of Argentine descent. He attended the same Swiss boarding school as his bandmate Julian Casablancas, where the two became friends. He moved to New York City in 1998 and attended New York University for a year and a half.

Casablancas invited Hammond to join the Strokes in 1999, being the last member to join the band. He plays rhythm guitar on most songs, and has some songwriting credits on the more instrumental pieces. Hammond is passionate about fashion and is known for wearing a three-piece suit on tour. Casablancas credits him for influencing the band's style. In 2009, he released a line of men's suits.

In 2006, Hammond released his debut solo album Yours to Keep, and followed up with ¿Cómo Te Llama? in 2008. Since then, he has released the 2013 EP AHJ, and the albums Momentary Masters, Francis Trouble, and Melodies on Hiatus in 2015, 2018, and 2023 respectively.

== Early life ==
Hammond was born on April 9, 1980 in Los Angeles, California. He is the son of British-Gibraltarian singer-songwriter Albert Hammond, a prolific songwriter best known for his 1972 hit single "It Never Rains in Southern California", and Argentine Claudia Fernández, a former model and beauty pageant winner. He has two older half-sisters. A first generation American, Hammond is of mixed Gibraltarian, Argentine, Austrian, and Peruvian descent; his first language was Spanish. Hammond began playing the guitar at age nine. He was a championship-winning roller skater as a child.

At the age of 12, Hammond was sent to boarding school Institut Le Rosey in Switzerland. While there, he became friends with future Strokes bandmate Julian Casablancas, a grade above him, whom he connected with as a fellow American. Hammond moved back to Los Angeles where he completed his high school education at the Buckley School. Following graduation in 1998, Hammond moved from Los Angeles to New York City and, having deferred admittance to New York University, took a short-term filmmaking course at the New York Film Academy. He later attended NYU's Tisch School of the Arts, but left after a year and a half.

== Career ==
=== The Strokes ===
After moving to New York City in September 1998, Hammond reconnected with his former school friend Casablancas, who later invited him to join the Strokes. Made up of Casablancas' other schoolmates Nikolai Fraiture, Nick Valensi, and Fabrizio Moretti, Hammond was the last person to join the band in 1999. In the following two years, the band practiced and performed tirelessly, all while Hammond was also attending NYU and working at Kim's Video. The Strokes released their first demo in January 2001, beginning a record label bidding war and years of critical acclaim. Since 2001, Hammond, as part of the Strokes, has released two EPs and seven full-length albums, most recently Reality Awaits in 2026. Hammond converted to Judaism shortly after the release of the Album "Is This It." Hammond has said that he converted so that fellow bandmate Nick Valensi would not be the only Jew in the band.

Hammond is usually seen playing a 1985 '70s reissue Olympic White Fender Stratocaster or a Gibson Les Paul Jr. that is sometimes used by bandmate Nick Valensi. On the majority of the Strokes' songs, he plays rhythm guitar, and solos are played by Valensi. The songs in which Hammond does play solos are "Last Nite", "Trying Your Luck", "Take It or Leave It", "Under Control", "The End Has No End", "Ize of the World", "Threat of Joy", "Vision of Division", and "Drag Queen". His solos tend to focus largely on more emotional, "bluesy"-type melodic work, and the guitar tends to have a cleaner, softer tone in comparison to Valensi's (with a notable exception found in "Vision of Division"). He often holds his guitar in a high horizontal position, similar to Buddy Holly, which he says is so that he can dance better.

Although vocalist Casablancas is the primary songwriter in the Strokes, Hammond co-wrote the track "Automatic Stop" with Casablancas for the group's second album, Room on Fire. He has been credited with writing three mostly instrumental songs ("Swiss Beats", "Holland", and "By the Way") for the band's 2001 tour video titled In Transit. These songs were reworked for his later solo album and have different titles ("Everyone Gets a Star", "Bright Young Thing", "In Transit"). He wrote "Elephant Song" when he was required to record a song for his Sound 101 class during his freshman year and used the school's recording equipment. The song was played at a few shows before the release of the Strokes' debut album. They later re-recorded the song as a special giveaway for fan club members.

=== Solo career ===
==== Yours to Keep and ¿Cómo Te Llama? (2006–2013) ====
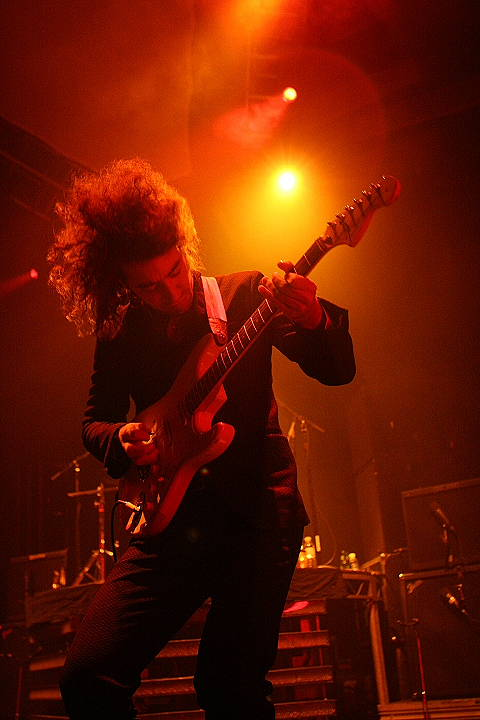
Hammond in 2007

In October 2005, Hammond and Ben Kweller released a version of "Wait" on This Bird Has Flown – A 40th Anniversary Tribute to the Beatles' Rubber Soul.

Hammond released a solo album titled Yours to Keep in the U.K. through Rough Trade Records on October 9, 2006 and in North America through New Line Records/Scratchie Records on March 6, 2007. Produced by Thin Lizard Dawn vocalist Lattimer and recorded at the Electric Lady Studios in New York City, the album features several musical guests, such as Sean Lennon, Ben Kweller, the Strokes' manager Ryan Gentles, Jody Porter of Fountains of Wayne, Chris Feinstein, Mikki James, Sammy James Jr. (The Mooney Suzuki), and the Strokes' lead singer, Casablancas. Bassist Josh Lattanzi and drummer Matt Romano serve as the backing band, with Hammond on guitar and vocals. The first single taken from the album, "101", was released exclusively through iTunes on September 4, 2006. "101" was the follow-up single to "Everyone Gets a Star". The music video debuted online in March 2007. It was going to be available in general music stores, unlike "Everyone Gets A Star," which was only available through the UK iTunes Music Store. It was released on November 27, 2006. The music video for "In Transit" was directed by Joaquin Phoenix.

Hammond has said to have been "waiting to make a record like this for years". Early support from his bandmates in the Strokes was only evident after Casablancas' role playing bass and back-up vocals on the track "Scared", though all of the members (with the exclusion of Nick Valensi, who was busy taking care of his newborn children) attended his shows in and around New York.

On March 16, 2007, at the South by Southwest festival, Hammond performed a 12-song set including covers of Frank Black's "Old Black Dawning" and Guided by Voices' "Postal Blowfish". Hammond also regularly covered the Cars' "Don't Cha Stop" in live performances. He supported Bloc Party on their world tour before making stops at Montreal's Metropolis and Toronto's Kool Haus. After this, Hammond headlined two North American tours along with a European tour. The North American tour featured his friends, the Mooney Suzuki. In November 2006, Hammond was announced to be joining Incubus on tour during their North American tour for their new album Light Grenades. On August 29, 2007, Hammond announced on MySpace that he was going back into the studio to record his second album in October 2007 for five weeks.

On March 20, 2008, Hammond posted a blog entry on MySpace in which he revealed the title of his second album: ¿Cómo Te Llama? He wrote that it contained 13 songs with a total length of 46 minutes and 30 seconds. He stated he hoped to be touring with the new album until the end of 2008. On May 27, 2008, Hammond released "GfC", the first single off ¿Cómo Te Llama?, on iTunes in the U.S. The song was played extensively live on his 2007 tour. A non-album song titled "& So It Goes" was released as a B-side along with the single. The album was released on July 7, 2008.

On May 29, 2008, Hammond was Myspace's featured artist and exclusively premiered his new album ¿Cómo Te Llama? uploading all the tracks of the album on his official Myspace page. He celebrated the release of his album with a July 8 small show at the Virgin Megastore, Union Square, in New York City. A noted absence from Hammond's band was recording bassist Josh Latzanni. Steve Schiltz of the band Longwave, who toured with Hammond on his first album also was missing. Although Hammond was supposed to play only two or three songs, he ended up playing almost 10, with a selection that included both new and old tracks. This show kicked off his worldwide tour in support of ¿Cómo Te Llama? with the next show being sold-out at the landmark venue Spaceland in the Silver Lake neighborhood of Los Angeles. This was his only appearance on the West Coast. The following month, Hammond's website officially announced that Hammond would be the support act of the British band Coldplay during their European Tour, which kicked off on September 1 in Strasbourg, France.

==== AHJ EP and Momentary Masters (2013–2017) ====
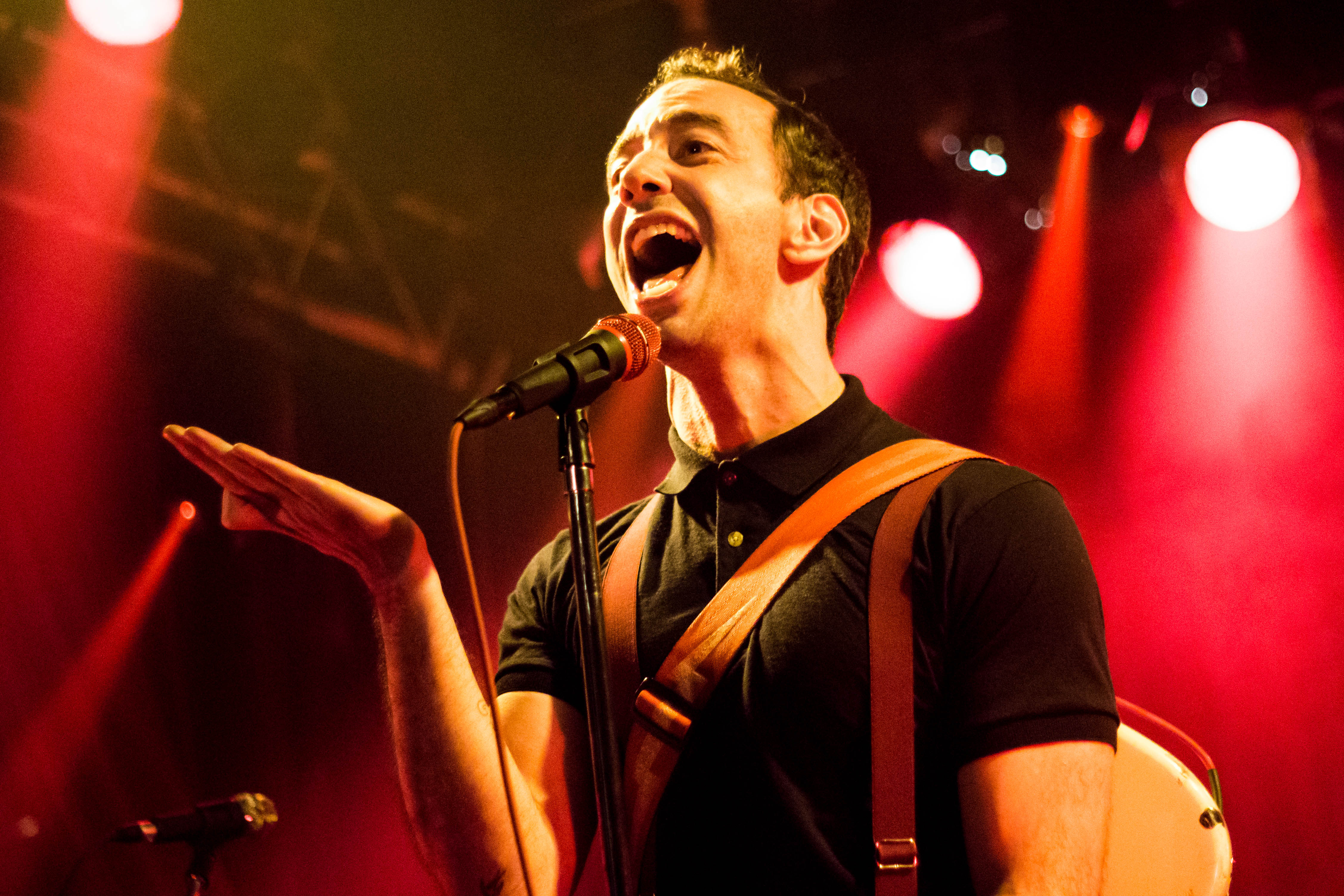
Hammond in 2013

In an interview with Har Mar Superstar in July 2013, Hammond revealed that he had recorded a five-song EP to be released via Julian Casablancas' Cult Records. Titled AHJ, it was released on October 8, 2013. Hammond stated in an interview promoting the EP on December 5, 2013, that he would be interested in playing solo as an opening act if the Strokes announced another tour: "I would definitely ask the guys if I could open for them. That'd be amazing."

On June 22, 2014, a photo was posted to Hammond's official Facebook page of himself in a room with other musicians and the caption "the start of something new; LP 3", suggesting that he is working on a third full-length album. Hammond released his third LP Momentary Masters on July 31, 2015 in the U.S. via Vagrant Records. The first single, "Born Slippy", was made instantly available for streaming and download via YouTube and iTunes respectively. Both AHJ and Momentary Masters were produced with Hammond's close collaborator Gus Oberg.

Hammond covered "The Little Boy that Santa Claus Forgot" by Vera Lynn mixed with the chorus from George Harrison's "My Sweet Lord" as part of Amazon's annual music series titled Indie for the Holidays. The song was released on December 1, 2017.

==== Francis Trouble (2018–present) ====
Hammond's fourth solo album Francis Trouble was released via Red Bull Records on March 9, 2018 and signed by A&R Kenny "Tick" Salcido. The first single "Muted Beatings" was released on February 2, 2018. In 2019, he released a new single, "Fast Times", preceding a brief Western USA tour. That May, he released the single "More to Life". The following year Albert was featured on the 2020 song "Another Hit of Showmanship" by the rock band the Struts.

== Artistry ==
=== Music ===
Guided by Voices, The Beach Boys, Buddy Holly, Frank Black, John Lennon, Matthew Sweet and The Velvet Underground are cited as Hammond's musical influences.

Albert's main guitar is a Fender Stratocaster Arctic White 1985 Reissue of a 1972. He owns three white Stratocasters, a Gibson Les Paul special single cutaway, a Rickenbacker 325, and a Gretsch hollowbody. His amplifier is a Fender Hot Rod DeVille 2x12. His pedal board is made up of an old version of the MXR Micro Amp, a V1 Jekyll and Hyde Ultimate Overdrive and Distortion, and a BOSS TU-2 tuner. In later shows, he adds another Micro Amp, and Jekyll and Hyde, and a Boss Digital Delay. He now uses a Mad Professor Deep Blue Delay pedal instead of the Boss Digital Delay.

=== Fashion ===
Hammond's sartorial trademark is wearing formal three-piece suits, and has been said by bandmate Julian Casablancas to be the most influential on the band's style. Hammond most recently collaborated with designer Amber Doyle for the Strokes' 2019 European tour. In a 2018 interview he stated that he'd had a passion for style from an early age, and has always combined his own designs with retail favorites. While Hammond has been best known for his formal wear, he launched his own range of Francis Trouble t-shirts and sports incorporated classic vintage tees.

In 2009, Hammond released his own line of men's suits which he co-designed with stylist Ilaria Urbinati. The suits were at first only available at Urbinati's soon-to-open Confederacy boutique in Los Angeles. Speaking about the designing endeavor, Hammond told New York magazine, "I want to make suits that I'm going to have for myself. They're for the person who needs his one suit for a wedding. He'd rather get something like this than go to Men's Wearhouse, pay the same amount, and look like an out-of-date parent." Hammond also collaborated with Elliot Aronow of Jacques-Elliott for a collection of ties in 2015.

== Personal life ==
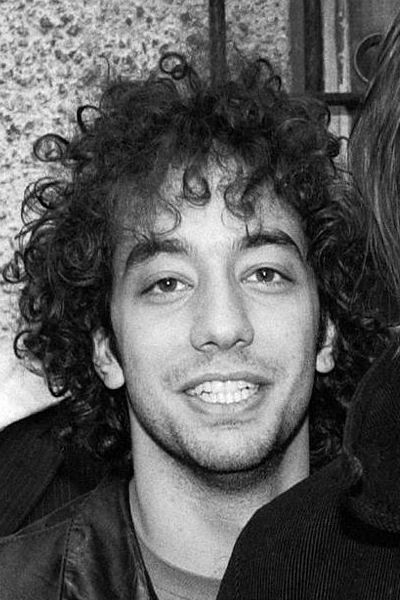
Hammond in 2002

Hammond married Polish restaurateur Justyna Sroka on December 23, 2013, with whom he has a daughter, Holiday, born in 2021. Hammond and Sroka divorced in 2023.

In October 2025, Hammond welcomed a baby with model Sarah Holt.

Hammond previously owned homes in the Nolita neighborhood of Manhattan and in New York's Catskill Mountains; in the late 2000s, he built his recording studio, One Way Studios, near his home in Port Jervis and later moved to the nearby community of Eldred. In the 2000s, he had relationships with British supermodel Agyness Deyn, as well as American musician Catherine Pierce of The Pierces.

In the 2000s, Hammond suffered from a serious drug addiction that involved cocaine, heroin and ketamine, among other drugs. He entered rehab in 2009 and has been sober since.

== Discography ==
=== Studio albums ===
Title	Album details	Peak chart positions							
Title	Album details	US	US Indie	AUS Hit.	BEL (WA)	FRA	SCO	SWE	UK
Yours to Keep	Release date: October 6, 2006; Label: Rough Trade; Formats: CD, digital download, LP	117	11	—	—	186	60	48	74
¿Cómo Te Llama?	Release date: July 7, 2008; Label: Rough Trade; Formats: CD, LP, digital download	145	20	—	—	168	—	—	183
Momentary Masters	Release date: July 31, 2015; Label: Vagrant, Infectious; Formats: CD, LP, digital download	— (Note: Momentary Masters did not enter the US Billboard 200, but peaked at number 3 on the US Heatseekers Albums Chart.)	20	20	160	—	—	—	115
Francis Trouble	Release date: March 9, 2018; Label: Red Bull Records; Formats: CD, LP, digital download	— (Note: Francis Trouble did not enter the US Billboard 200, but peaked at number 6 on the US Heatseekers Albums Chart.)	25	—	—	—	—	—	—
Melodies on Hiatus	Release date: June 23, 2023; Label: Red Bull Records; Formats: CD, LP, digital download	—	—	—	—	—	—	—	—
"—" denotes either release did not chart or correct figures unknown

=== EPs ===
Title	EP details
AHJ	Label: Cult Records; Release: October 8, 2013; Formats: LP, digital download

=== Singles ===
Single	Year	Peak positions					Album/EP
Single	Year	US Alt	MEX Air.	SCO	UK	UK Indie	Album/EP
"Everyone Gets a Star"	2006	—	—	—	—	—	Yours to Keep
"Back to the 101"	2006	—	—	41	76	2	Yours to Keep
"In Transit"	2007	—	—	—	—	—	Yours to Keep
"GfC"	2008	—	—	67	— (Note: "GfC" did not enter the UK Singles Chart, but peaked at number 66 on the UK Physical Singles Chart Top 100.)	4	¿Cómo Te Llama?
"St. Justice"	2013	—	—	—	—	—	AHJ
"Carnal Cruise"	2013	—	—	—	—	—	AHJ
"Strange Tidings"	2014	—	—	—	—	—	AHJ
"Born Slippy"	2015	—	—	—	—	—	Momentary Masters
"Losing Touch"	2015	—	—	—	—	—	Momentary Masters
"Muted Beatings"	2018	—	37	—	—	—	Francis Trouble
"Far Away Truths"	2018	24	—	—	—	—	Francis Trouble
"Set to Attack"	2018	—	—	—	—	—	Francis Trouble
"Fast Times"	2019	—	—	—	—	—	Non-album singles
"More to Life"	2019	—	—	—	—	—	Non-album singles
"Another Hit of Showmanship" (with The Struts)	2020	40	—	—	—	—	Strange Days
"—" denotes releases that did not chart

== See also ==
- List of Gibraltarians
- Music of Gibraltar
- Argentine American
