= The Voidz discography =

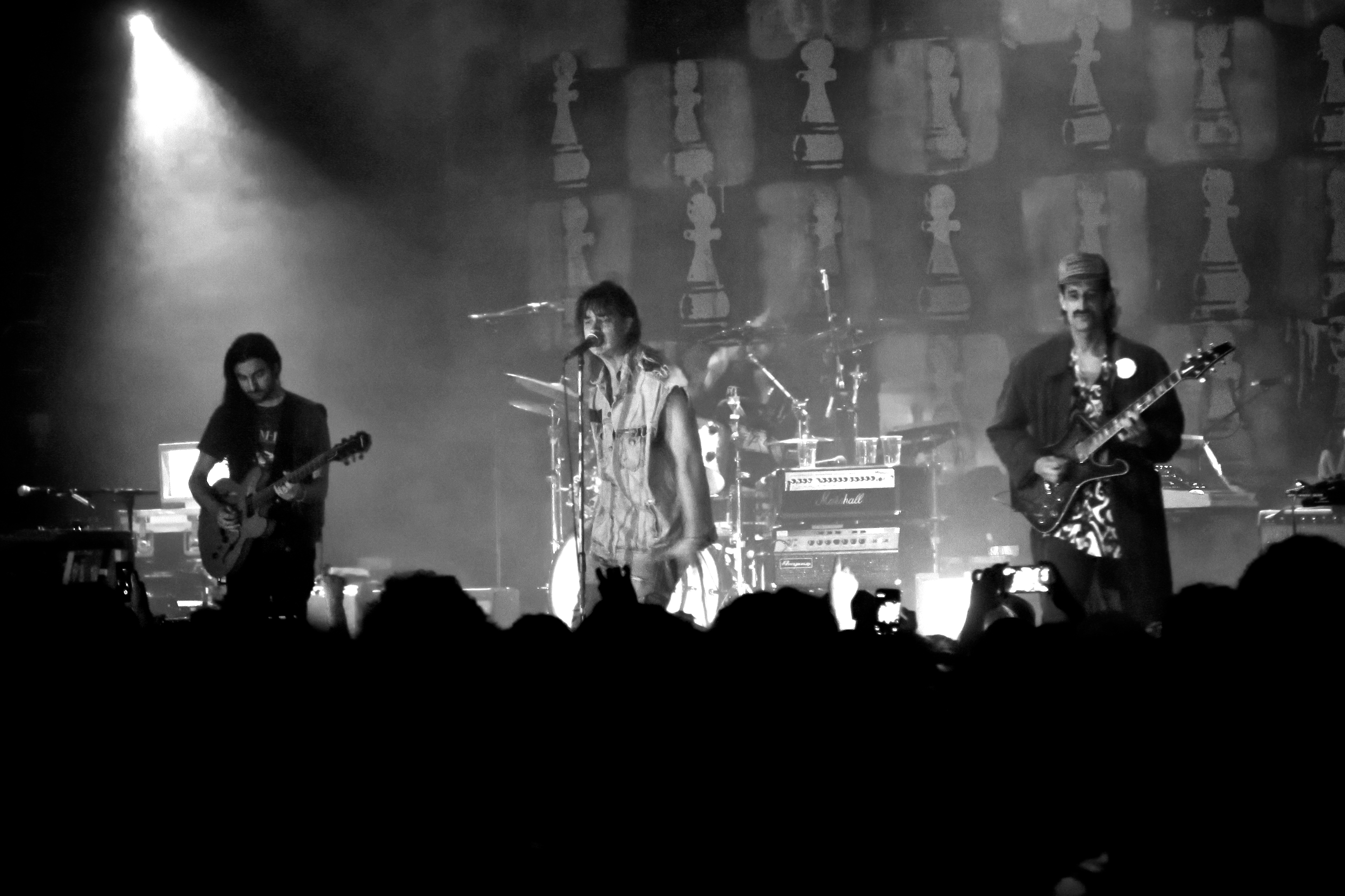
- Julian Casablancas + The Voidz performing at The Coronet, 7th December 2014.
- Studio albums: 3
- Singles: 11
- Music videos: 9

This article presents the complete discography of The Voidz.

== Studio albums ==
List of studio albums, with selected chart positions, sales figures and certifications
Title	Details	Peak chart positions							
Title	Details	US	US Alt	US Rock	BEL (FL)	BEL (WA)	FRA	NZ Heat.	UK
Tyranny	Release date: September 23, 2014; Label: Cult; Formats: Download, CD, vinyl; (As Julian Casablancas+The Voidz)	39	2	10	176	128	90	—	111
Virtue	Release date: March 30, 2018; Label: Cult, RCA; Formats: Download, CD, vinyl	151	8	23	—	—	—	9	—
Like All Before You	Release date: September 20, 2024; Label: Cult, RCA; Formats: Download, CD, vinyl	—	—	—	—	—	—	—	—
"—" denotes releases that did not chart

== EPs ==
Title	Album details
Męğż Øf Råm	Released: July 30, 2025; Label: Cult; Formats: Download, CD, Vinyl

== Singles ==
List of singles
Title	Year	Album
"Human Sadness"	2014	Tyranny
"Where No Eagles Fly"	2014	Tyranny
"Leave It in My Dreams"	2018	Virtue
"Qyurryus"	2018	Virtue
"Pointlessness"	2018	Virtue
"All Wordz Are Made Up"	2018	Virtue
"ALieNNatioN"	2018	Virtue
"Pyramid of Bones"	2018	Virtue
"Coul as a Ghoul"	2018	Non-album singles
"The Eternal Tao"	2019	Non-album singles
"Did My Best"	2019	Non-album singles
"Alien Crime Lord"	2020	Non-album singles
"The Eternal Tao 2.0"	2021	Non-album singles
"Infinity Repeating (2013 Demo)" (Daft Punk featuring Julian Casablancas and the Voidz)	2023	Random Access Memories (10th Anniversary Edition)
"Prophecy of the Dragon" / "American Way" (B-side)	2023	Like All Before You
"Flexorcist"	2023	Like All Before You
"All The Same"	2024	Like All Before You
"Overture"	2024	Like All Before You
"7 Horses"	2024	Like All Before You
"Blue Demon"	2025	Męğż Øf Råm

== Music videos ==
List of music videos
Title	Year	Director(s)	Ref.
"Where No Eagles Fly"	2014	Jeramy "Beardo" Gritter	
"Human Sadness"	2015	Warren Fu and Nicholaus Goossen	
"Father Electricity"	2017	Jorge M. Fontana	
"Qyurryus"	2018	Julian Casablancas	
"All Wordz Are Made Up"	2018	Jeramy 'Beardo' Gritter	
"Pyramid of Bones"	2018	Nicholaus Goossen	
"Pink Ocean"	2018		
"Permanent High School"	2019	Hala Matar	
"Did My Best" & "The Eternal Tao 2.0"	2019	Johann Rashid AKA Promiseland	
"Infinity Repeating"	2023	Warren Fu	
"Flexorcist" and "Prophecy of the Dragon"	2023	Johann Rashid AKA Promiseland	
