= Human Sadness =

2014 single by Julian Casablancas + The Voidz

- Cover art featuring Out of the Black and into the White (2012) by Kon Trubkovich.

Single by Julian Casablancas+The Voidz

from the album Tyranny
- Released: September 2, 2014
- Recorded: 2014
- Genre: Experimental rock; indie rock; noise rock; progressive rock
- Length: 10:57
- Label: Cult Records
- Songwriters: Julian Casablancas; Alex Carapetis
- Producer: Shawn Everett

Julian Casablancas+The Voidz singles chronology
"Human Sadness" (2014)	"Where No Eagles Fly" (2014)

"Human Sadness" is the debut single by American rock band Julian Casablancas + The Voidz. It was released on September 2, 2014, via Casablancas' indie record label Cult Records and is from their debut album Tyranny. The song is nearly eleven minutes long.

== Origin and composition ==
Drummer Alex Carapetis brought a sample of Mozart's Requiem in D Minor to lead singer Julian Casablancas attention, which was then used as a starting point. The lyrics of the song, "Put money in my hand and I will do the things you want me to," allude to their album's themes of greed and corruption, while the rest of the song examines the lead singer's relationship with his estranged father, John Casablancas, who died in 2013 from cancer.

== Reception ==
"Human Sadness" has been described very positively by critics, some describing it as "a structure-less beast that features everything from jarring noise and warped, processed vocals to bombastic stadium rock solos and a hint of the gritty NYC punk Casablancas is best known for." It has also been compared to the Sufjan Stevens album The Age of Adz.

== Music video ==
The music video for "Human Sadness" was released on May 27, 2015. The video was co-directed by Warren Fu, Nicholaus Goossen, and Wiissa. The story of the video was conceived by Casablancas, Fu, and bassist Jake Bercovici and explores several storylines of human sorrow and anguish, portrayed by each member of the band juxtaposed against footage of the band playing as the apocalypse occurs on Earth. The video was inspired by the story of "the band that played on" on the Titanic as the ship sank. The end credits feature the demo of "Human Sadness" that Casablancas composed for the 2012 short film The Unseen Beauty, a profile on Casablancas' step-father and artistic mentor Sam Adoquei. The music video took over a year to complete.
