= Rey Pila =

Mexican rock band

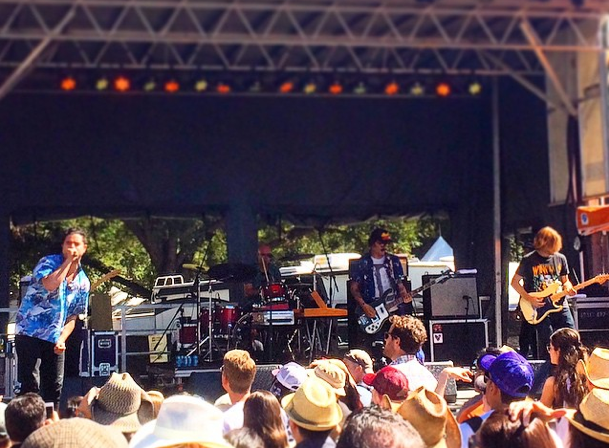
- Rey Pila performing at the 2014 Austin City Limits Music Festival

Background information
- Origin: Mexico City, Mexico
- Genres: Indie rock; synth-rock; new wave; synth-pop
- Years active: 2010–present
- Labels: Arts & Crafts México, Cult Records
- Members: Diego Solórzano; Andrés Velasco; Rodrigo Blanco
- Past members: Miguel Hernández
- Website: reypila.com

Rey Pila is a Mexican rock band formed in Mexico City in 2010. The band consists of Diego Solórzano, Andrés Velasco and Rodrigo Blanco, though it started as Solórzano's solo project. The name "Rey Pila" is Spanish for "King Battery", a phrase Diego saw in a painting by the late graffiti artist Jean-Michel Basquiat.

== History ==
=== Formation and debut album ===
Rey Pila was created as the solo project of Diego Solórzano, former frontman for Los Dynamite. After splitting from Los Dynamite in 2008, Diego immediately began work on material for his solo project. Rey Pila released their first self-titled album in 2010, which was recorded in New York and co-produced by Diego and Paul Mahajan. The album contains songs in both English and Spanish. Vice magazine said, "The record belongs in the long and storied lineage of Mexican garage bands, from the garden path acid rock of Los Ovnis to the Beatles-esque jams of Los Locos." Solórzano enlisted long-time friends Andrés Velasco, Rodrigo Blanco and Miguel Hernández to play the first album live, and they ended up as full-time members of the band. By the end of 2011, Rey Pila had formally become a quartet.

=== The Future Sugar ===
In 2012, the band entered DFA Studios in New York City to begin work on their second album with producer Chris Coady. With this new material, Rey Pila caught the attention of Julian Casablancas. Casablancas described how he first came across Rey Pila's music in an interview with NME:

"I was in our office in New York – the Cult Records office when it was above the famous Strand book store – and I heard this song blasting out of a car radio from the street below, and I thought, ‘Wow what a cool sound, this sounds like some modern hit, but if pop music was actually cool.’ I was actually genuinely distraught and bummed that I might never know what this magical song was… So as I walk out of Cult a minute later, in tears probably, I realized to my amazement that the song was actually playing across the hall. It was a different office than ours and when I went to ask what the song was, it turns out it was an unsigned band looking for a label. Song was ‘Alexander’, band was Rey Pila.”

Rey Pila signed to Julian Casablancas's label Cult Records, which released double-sided single "Alexander/Lady in Red" in October 2013. The band embarked on their first European tour at the end of 2013, opening for labelmate Albert Hammond Jr., and then supported Interpol on their 2014 North American tour.

In March 2015, Rey Pila announced their second studio album, The Future Sugar, which was originally set to be released on May 5 of that same year. Soon after, they released a new single "What a Nice Surprise", which Spin magazine described as "a glittering build-up of reverberating synths and ’80s-inspired guitar licks". The band then embarked on a US tour with The Rentals.

After hearing some new demos Rey Pila was working on, Julian Casablancas urged the band to add three of these new songs to the album, which he co-produced himself. The lengthy process delayed the record's release. "Fire Away", one of the new Julian Casablancas produced tracks, was released as a single on July 16, 2015, and the new release date for The Future Sugar was finally announced for September 25, 2015. Rey Pila then embarked on a tour with Brandon Flowers to support the release of the new album.

According to the band, the album title was inspired by a phrase from David Lynch's movie Wild at Heart. Noisey called Rey Pila's "most excellent new album's" sound as "a little new wave, a little Cars, a little bit of a Bowie quaver, a pinch of Q Lazzarus, a lot of switchblade cool".

On May 31, 2016, Rey Pila premiered a new Warren Fu directed video for "Surveillance Camera", and that same night opened for their new labelmates The Strokes at the Capitol Theatre in Port Chester, NY.

=== Wall of Goth EP ===
At the end of 2016, Rey Pila entered Red Bull Studios in New York City to record new songs with Julian Casablancas and producer Shawn Everett. Those recordings made up Wall of Goth, a four-song EP that was released on April 28, 2017.

In October 2017, the band embarked on the Hollywood Bolívar Tour, their first South American tour, with labelmates the Voidz and Promiseland. Rey Pila closed out the year with a sold-out headline show in one of Mexico City's most prestigious venues, El Plaza Condesa.

Some months later, in March 2018, Rey Pila released a cover of the Siouxsie and the Banshees song "Israel", and opened the Mexico City shows of Depeche Mode's Global Spirit Tour.

=== Lucky No. 7 EP ===
Lucky No. 7 EP was released on September 26, 2019 through Arts & Crafts México. The five-track EP was recorded at Sonic Ranch Studios in Tornillo, Texas, produced by frontman Diego Solórzano, with additional production and mixing by Ricardo Acasuso, and mastering by Brian Lucey at Magic Garden Mastering.

Following the release, Rey Pila opened for the French band Phoenix during their Ti Amo residency at El Plaza Condesa in Mexico City, and were later selected by The Cure to support their October 2019 concert at Foro Sol.

The EP's lead single, "Disciples IV", was included in Reactor 105.7 FM’s year-end list of the best songs of 2019.

=== Velox Veritas ===
Velox Veritas, their third studio album, was released on August 21, 2020 through Arts & Crafts México. Produced by Diego Solórzano and Dave Sitek of TV on the Radio and recorded at Sonic Ranch Studios in Texas, the album was praised for its blend of electronic and guitar-driven rock.

UK’s Clash Magazine described Rey Pila as having “a unique sound, a cultural cross-exchange that matches stellar songwriting to a diverse palette of influences.”, while Rolling Stone México named it one of the best albums of 2020. and the single "Let It Burn" was also included in Reactor 105.7 FM’s year-end list of best songs. The album’s cover artwork was created by Mexican artist Dr. Lakra, known for his tattoo-inspired and subcultural visual art.

Due to the COVID-19 pandemic, the band was unable to tour or present the album live following its release and took a short hiatus.

=== E.P. ===
During their short hiatus, on September 9, 2022 Rey Pila quietly released a six-track E.P. without a formal tour or promotional campaign. The record includes the singles "Amygdalae" and "IQ Test," produced in collaboration with German electronic DJ and producer Boys Noize.

Mexican outlets such as Revista Marvin and IndieRocks! praised the darker, more guitar-driven sound of the release, highlighting the contrast between the frenetic energy of "Amygdalae" and the slower, synth-heavy atmosphere of "IQ Test." The EP was noted as a creative comeback for the band following the COVID-19 pandemic.

Rey Pila returned to the stage in January 2023 with a special comeback show at the Multiforo Alicia in Mexico City, where they debuted material from the EP and Velox Veritas alongside earlier fan favorites.

=== ESTAN STRANGE I ===
After their comeback show, Rey Pila returned to the studio to record ESTAN STRANGE I, their fourth studio album, released on November 28, 2024 through Arts & Crafts México. The band worked closely with producer and DJ Paul Salva. He co-produced several tracks upon which the band began shaping the album’s sound. Solórzano described the collaboration as “like going to music school,” noting that Salva helped push Rey Pila’s sound further into electronic territory and accelerated their artistic growth. The album features tracks in both English and Spanish, marking a stylistic evolution that blends darkwave, dance rock, and electronic influences.

UK outlet FAULT Magazine highlighted the band’s adaptive creativity and DIY production approach, while SonOfMarketing praised the single "One of Us" for its hook-laden mix of synth-pop and rock. Mexican media including Sopitas and Revista Marvin lauded the album’s maturity and experimentation, and SopitasFM listed "Fantasma" among the best songs of 2024.

To celebrate the release, Rey Pila performed a sold-out show at Mexico City’s Auditorio BB, where they presented the album live for the first time. The band also supported Justice in their Mexico shows and later issued a deluxe edition in 2025 with additional tracks.

== Discography ==
=== Studio albums ===
- Rey Pila (2010)
- The Future Sugar (2015)
- Velox Veritas (2020)
- ESTAN STRANGE I (2024)

=== Singles & EPs ===
- "Alexander" (2013)
- "What a Nice Surprise" (2015)
- "Apex" (2015)
- "Fire Away" (2015)
- "Blast" (2016)
- "Ninjas" (2017)
- "How Do You Know?" (2017)
- Wall of Goth EP (2017)
- "Fangs" (2017)
- "Israel" (2018)
- Lucky No. 7 EP (2019)
- E.P. (2022)

== Videography ==
- "No. 114" (April 2010, directed by Bang Buro)
- "No Longer Fun" (July 2010, directed by Ariel Danziger and Alan Whitcher)
- "Alexander" (April 2014, directed by Sammy Rawal)
- "Fire Away" (December 2015, directed by Derrick Acosta & Dusty Peterman)
- "Surveillance Camera" (May 2016, directed by Warren Fu)
- "Ninjas" (May 2017, directed by Nina Ljeti)
