= Estan Strange I =

ESTAN STRANGE I

Studio album by Rey Pila
- Released: 28 November 2024
- Recorded: 2021–2024
- Studios: Sonic Ranch Studios, various studios in Mexico City
- Genres: Indie rock, electronic rock, dark wave, synth-pop
- Length: 36:22
- Label: Arts & Crafts México
- Producers: Diego Solórzano, Paul Salva

Rey Pila chronology
E.P. (2022)	ESTAN STRANGE I (2024)

Singles from ESTAN STRANGE I
- 1. "Ani Oni / Fantasma" Released: mid-2024 2. "Friend Request / Online Soul" Released: 8 August 2024; 3. "Ojos De Terror" Released: 26 September 2024; 4. "No Me Arrastres" Released: 18 October 2024; 5. "One of Us" Released: 30 October 2024

ESTAN STRANGE I is the fourth studio album by Mexican rock band Rey Pila, released on 28 November 2024, through Arts & Crafts México. The record marked the group’s first full-length release since 2020’s Velox Veritas. Produced primarily by Diego Solórzano with contributions from American producer Paul Salva, Nathan Phillips, Lee Smith, and Charlie Hugall, the album incorporates tracks sung in both English and Spanish, expanding the band’s retro-futurist sound into darker electronic and dance rock territory.

== Background and production ==
Much of the album’s early writing and production took place during 2022 and 2023, with the band collaborating closely with DJ and producer Paul Salva. Solórzano described the experience as “like going to music school,” noting that Salva pushed the group further into electronic territory and accelerated their artistic growth. Salva had previously remixed “Alexander” from the band’s debut album. Some tracks were mixed UK-based Charlie Hugall (known for his work with Florence + The Machine), Nathan Phillips and Lee Smith.

== Critical reception ==
ESTAN STRANGE I was well received internationally and in Latin America. UK’s FAULT Magazine praised its adaptive creativity and DIY production ethos, while Italian outlet SonOfMarketing singled out the single "One of Us" for its hook-laden blend of synth-pop and rock. In Mexico, Sopitas and Revista Marvin lauded the album’s maturity and experimentation, and Rokkers called it “a bold new phase” in the band’s career. SopitasFM listed the track "Fantasma" among the best songs of 2024.

== Live performances ==
To celebrate the release of ESTAN STRANGE I, Rey Pila performed a sold-out show at Auditorio BB in Mexico City, presenting the album live for the first time. Shortly afterward, the band supported French electronic duo Justice at their Mexico City concert. A deluxe edition of the album, featuring additional tracks, was released in 2025.

== Track listing ==
All tracks are written by Diego Solórzano, Andrés Velasco and Rodrigo Blanco.

No.	Title	Length
1.	"Fidelo"	1:16
2.	"Ani Oni"	3:00
3.	"Drop Out"	3:34
4.	"One of Us"	3:12
5.	"Fantasma"	3:23
6.	"Ojos De Terror"	2:36
7.	"Dreaming of Dreaming"	1:56
8.	"Friend Request"	2:48
9.	"Running Blood"	3:13
10.	"Online Soul"	3:09
11.	"No Me Arrastres"	3:01
12.	"Fantasma II"	3:40
13.	"(music fades)"	1:30
Total length:		36:22

== Credits ==
- Diego Solórzano – producer
- Paul Salva - producer, mixing
- Charlie Hugall, Nathan Phillips, Lee Smith – mixing
- Pepe G- mastering
