= Fernando Casablancas =

Spanish inventor and entrepreneur

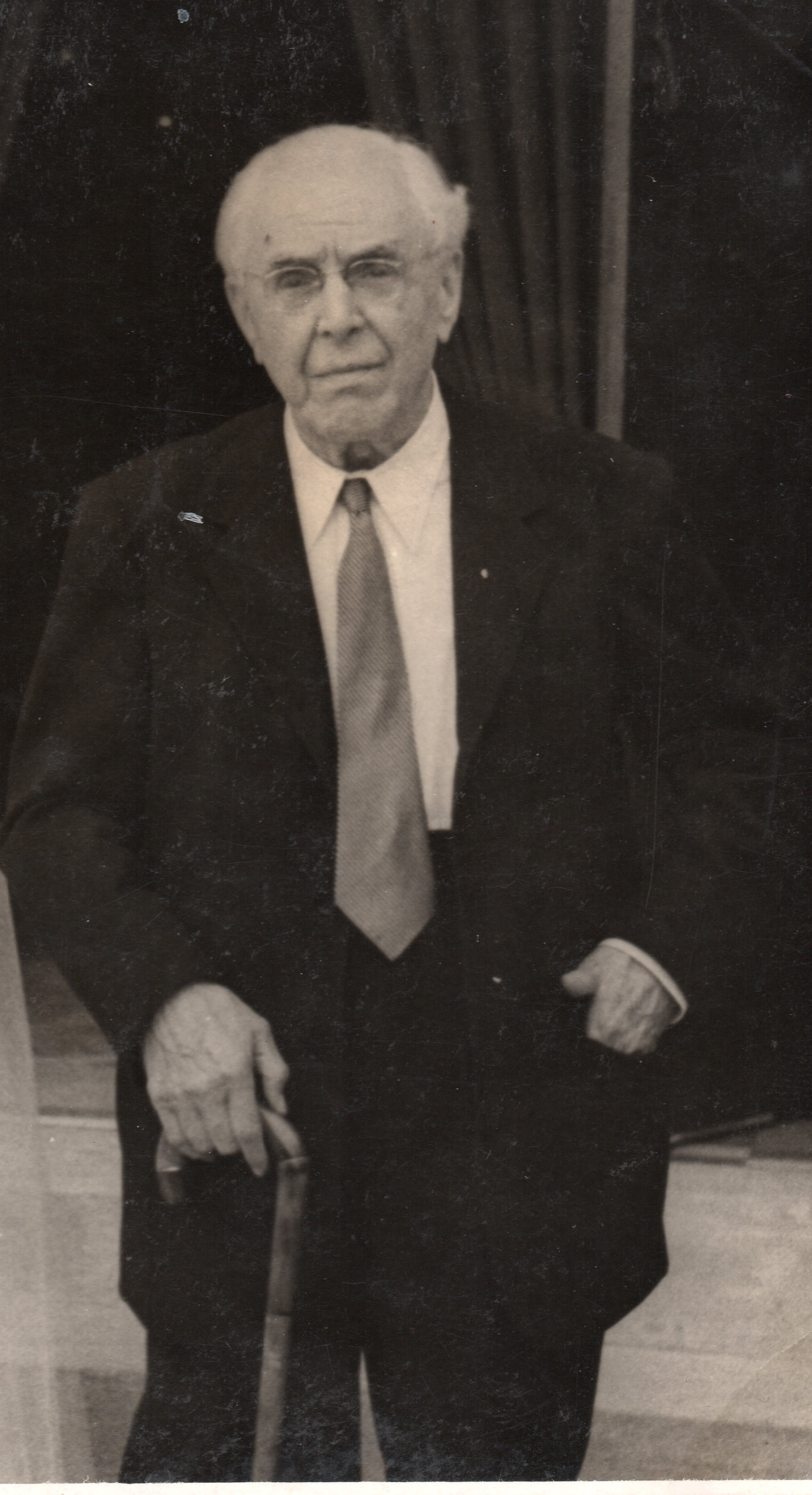
- Born: October 28, 1874; Sabadell, Spain
- Died: October 21, 1960 (aged 85); Barcelona, Spain
- Occupations: Inventor; businessman; banker; politician
- Political party: Regionalist League
- Spouse: Josefa Bertrán (m. 1901)
- Children: 4, including Juan
- Relatives: John Casablancas (grandson) Julian Casablancas (great-grandson)

Fernando Casablancas Planell (Catalan: Ferran Casablancas i Planell; October 28, 1874 – October 21, 1960) was a Spanish inventor, businessman, banker and politician.

== Biography ==
=== Early life ===
Fernando Casablancas Planell was born in Sabadell, Spain, on October 28, 1874. He was the youngest of three children born to Ferran Casablancas i Peig (1835 – 1893) and Dolors Planell i Torrella (died 1928). His father moved to Sabadell from the neighboring town of Sant Quirze del Vallès (formerly Sant Quirze de Terrassa) after leaving his family's farmhouse, as he had not inherited it. Once he had settled in Sabadell, Casablancas i Peig set up a small woolen mill, which in turn supplied another woolen industry. Casablancas Planell had two older sisters, Dolors and Engràcia.

After turning 14, he began working at his father's factory. In 1893, his father died as a result of a workplace accident that left him with severe burns, which forced him to take over management of the factory.

=== Invention and business career ===
He investigated the problems of spinning textile fibers and in 1913 invented a device for spinning cotton using large draws, a system that revolutionized the cotton industry by greatly reducing the time and cost of spinning. On September 30 of that same year, he presented his invention to the Sabadell Industrial School, and it was patented shortly thereafter. He later refined the mechanism by creating new models that were also universally adopted. To exploit his inventions, he created several companies, some abroad. In 1915, he founded the Casablancas Spinning Mills Company (Catalan: Filatures Casablancas), which, after the forced interruption caused by World War I and the post-war period, became the parent company of a multinational corporation. By 1925, his mechanism was adopted by major textile mills around the world.

By 1936, Casablancas patents had been introduced in France and Belgium (Louis Motte), England (through Casablancas High Draft Co. Ltd. in Manchester, led by Francesc Permanyer), the USSR and China (Claudi Portella), the United States (through American Casablancas Co.), Mexico (Martirià Mirabet and Eudald Franquesa), Brazil (Salvador Inglada), Japan, Turkey, and Greece.

=== Banking career ===
Casablancas served as president of Banco Sabadell (Catalan: Banc Sabadell), which remains in operation to this day, from 1926 to 1936 and from 1946 to 1960.

=== Role in politics ===
Casablancas was a member of the Regionalist League (Catalan: Lliga Regionalista), a conservative political party with a Catalanist and monarchist platform, whom he represented at the municipal level for the districts of Barcelona in the 1933 general election. He also maintained a close friendship with the party's founder and leader, Francesc Cambó, who served as Minister of Finance and Public Works in several cabinets during the reign of Alfonso XIII.

== Personal life and death ==
Casablancas married Josefa Bertrán Oliu (Catalan: Josepa Bertran i Oliu), the daughter of one of the managers at his father's factory, in 1901. The couple had four children: Fernando (Ferran), Antonia (Antònia), Juan (Joan), and María (Maria) Casablancas Bertrán. His sons ran the business group he had founded from New York and Geneva. In addition, his son Juan, like him, became involved in the banking sector, serving as president of the Banco Mercantil de Manresa and, later, as a member of the board of directors of Banca Catalana. Both banks are now defunct. His daughter María married the journalist and politician Carlos Sentís, who was elected as a Member of Parliament for Barcelona in 1977, and with whom she had three children. Casablancas died on October 21, 1960, in Barcelona, at the age of 85.

Through his son Fernando, he is the grandfather of John Casablancas, a modeling agent and founder of the modeling agency Elite Model Management. Through John, he is the great-grandfather of Julian Casablancas, lead singer of the bands The Strokes and The Voidz.

== Philanthropy ==
Casablancas spearheaded the founding of the Spinners' Association (Catalan: Associació de Filadors) and the Sabadell Mutual Work Accident Insurance (Catalan: Mútua Sabadellenca d'Accidents de Treball), motivated by the workplace accident that claimed his father's life. He contributed to Sabadell's water supply between the 1920s and 1950s, eventually serving as vice president of the Sabadell Water Company.

As part of his efforts to promote culture, he supported the creation and preservation of the Sabadell Museum, and later became an honorary member of the Bosch and Cardellach Foundation (Catalan: Fundació Bosch i Cardellach), designed to promote historical and cultural research of Sabadell.

== Awards and honors ==
He was inducted as an honorary member of the Textile Institute of Manchester in 1941 for his contributions to the industry, becoming the first foreigner and the first Spaniard to receive this honor.

In 1945, the Savings Bank of Sabadell awarded him the Citizenship Prize.

He was decorated with the Grand Cross of the Civil Merit and, in 1954, received the Gold Medal of the Deputation of Barcelona.

In 1955, the Sabadell City Council named him an Honorary Citizen of the city.
