= Virtue (The Voidz album) =

Studio album by the Voidz
- Released: March 30, 2018
- Recorded: Los Angeles
- Genre: New wave; neo-psychedelia; garage rock; psychedelic pop
- Length: 58:09
- Label: Cult; RCA
- Producer: Shawn Everett; Chris Tabron

The Voidz chronology
Tyranny (2014)	Virtue (2018)	Like All Before You (2024)

Singles from Virtue
- 1. "Leave It in My Dreams" Released: January 23, 2018; 2. "Qyurryus" Released: January 24, 2018; 3. "Pointlessness" Released: February 13, 2018; 4. "All Wordz Are Made Up" Released: March 2, 2018; 5. "ALieNNatioN" Released: March 15, 2018

Professional ratings
Aggregate scores
Source	Rating
Metacritic	68/100
Review scores
Source	Rating
DIY	4/5 stars
NME	4/5 stars
Pitchfork	6.9/10
Rolling Stone	3.5/5 stars

Virtue is the second studio album by American band the Voidz, released on March 30, 2018, through Cult and RCA. It is the band's first album after shortening their name from "Julian Casablancas + The Voidz" to "The Voidz".

== Production, promotion and release ==
On October 7, 2017, The Voidz played songs from Virtue for the first time during a secret show (billed as "YouTube Comments", a supposed Voidz tribute band) in Los Angeles, including "Wink", "Alienation", "We're Where We Were", "My Friend the Walls" and "Lazy Boy". The band also played "Wink" on the Brazilian talk show The Noite while on a tour of South America during the same month.

On December 8, 2017, the band released a teaser video directed by Warren Fu, announcing the album, the simplification of their name to The Voidz and also their signing to RCA. The video features snippets of the songs "Pointlessness" and "Pyramid of Bones", as well as the Les Paul and Mary Ford song "The World Is Waiting for the Sunrise".

The album's first single, "Leave It in My Dreams", was released on January 23, 2018, followed by a second single, "Qyurryus", the next day. "Pointlessness", "All Wordz Are Made Up", and "ALieNNatioN" were then released respectively as the following singles, while a music video for "Pyramid of Bones" was released on March 29, 2018.

The album artwork features a 2015 painting by Argentinian-Spanish artist Felipe Pantone.

The track "Think Before You Drink" is an acoustic cover and rearrangement of a 1978 disco song by the musician Michael Cassidy. The band was inspired by a cover of the song performed by Hansadutta Swami.

== Reception ==
The album received mostly positive reviews from critics. The NME were largely positive about the record, awarding it four stars out of five. They also described it as an easier listen than the band's debut record, Tyranny. DIY called Virtue a "mad experiment of throwing a thousand things at the wall," but also gave the record four stars, calling it "truly a mercurial beast". Pitchfork were less effusive. They criticised Casablancas' "commitment to obfuscation". Awarding the album a score of 6.9, Virtue is framed as a "a record where inspired ideas are constantly battling for oxygen with dubious ones".

== Track listing ==
All tracks are written by the Voidz, except where noted.

Virtue track listing
No.	Title	Length
1.	"Leave It in My Dreams"	3:59
2.	"Qyurryus"	2:52
3.	"Pyramid of Bones"	4:28
4.	"Permanent High School"	4:13
5.	"ALieNNatioN"	4:39
6.	"One of the Ones"	2:38
7.	"All Wordz Are Made Up" (outro-bridge co-written by Jon Pancoast)	3:19
8.	"Think Before You Drink" (Jeffrey Armstrong, Michael Cassidy)	2:46
9.	"Wink"	4:00
10.	"My Friend the Walls"	4:03
11.	"Pink Ocean"	5:26
12.	"Black Hole"	3:15
13.	"Lazy Boy"	3:30
14.	"We're Where We Were"	3:46
15.	"Pointlessness"	5:15
Total length:		58:09

Japanese bonus track
No.	Title	Length
16.	"Coul as a Ghoul"	2:41
Total length:		60:57

== Personnel ==
The Voidz

- Jacob Bercovici – bass guitar, synthesizer
- Alex Carapetis – drums
- Julian Casablancas – vocals
- Jeramy "Beardo" Gritter – guitar
- Jeff Kite – keyboards
- Amir Yaghmai – guitar

Technical

- Shawn Everett – production (tracks 1–7, 9–15), mixing (all tracks)
- Chris Tabron – production (track 8), additional production (5, 13)
- Ben Baptie – mastering
- Andy Wallace – mixing
- Alana da Fonseca – additional production (tracks 1–7, 9–15)

Visuals

- Felipe Pantone – cover art
- Michael Molfetas – design
- Sarah Schmitt – design
- Cheryl Georgette – photography
- Frank Fu – photography

== Charts ==
Chart performance for Virtue
Chart (2018)	Peak position
New Zealand Heatseeker Albums (RMNZ)	9
US Billboard 200	151
US Billboard Alternative Albums (Billboard)	8
US Billboard Rock Albums (Billboard)	23
