= The Future Sugar =

Studio album by Rey Pila
- Released: July 17, 2015
- Recorded: 2012; 2015
- Genre: Indie rock, electronic rock, new wave
- Length: 33:01
- Label: Cult Records
- Producer: Chris Coady, Julian Casablancas, Diego Solórzano

Rey Pila chronology
Rey Pila (2010)	The Future Sugar (2015)	Wall of Goth (2017)

Singles from The Future Sugar
- 1. "Alexander" Released: 17 October 2013; 2. "What a Nice Surprise" Released: 14 April 2015; 3. "Fire Away" Released: 16 July 2015

Professional ratings
Review scores
Source	Rating
AllMusic	3.5/5 stars

The Future Sugar is the second full-length album by Mexican rock band Rey Pila, released on July 17, 2015 via Cult Records.

== Track listing ==
All tracks are written by Diego Solórzano, Andrés Velasco and Rodrigo Blanco.

No.	Title	Length
1.	"Fire Away"	3:09
2.	"White Night"	4:37
3.	"Surveillance Camera"	3:54
4.	"Alexander"	3:30
5.	"False Self System"	3:26
6.	"The Future Sugar"	3:14
7.	"Nerds"	3:29
8.	"Order Police"	3:39
9.	"What a Nice Surprise"	4:03
Total length:		33:01

Mexican edition bonus tracks
No.	Title	Length
10.	"Blast"	3:46
11.	"Apex"	4:22

== Credits ==
- Chris Coady – producer
- Julian Casablancas – producer
- Diego Solórzano – producer
- Shawn Everett – mixer
- Joe LaPorta – mastering
- Liz Hirsch – artwork
