= Like All Before You =

Studio album by The Voidz
- Released: September 20, 2024
- Studios: The Voidz' home studio; Vox Studios
- Length: 42:51
- Label: Cult
- Producers: Ivan Wayman; Justin Raisen; Sadpony

The Voidz chronology
Virtue (2018)	Like All Before You (2024)

Singles from Like All Before You
- 1. "Prophecy of the Dragon" Released: May 26, 2023; 2. "Flexorcist" Released: October 27, 2023; 3. "All the Same" Released: February 21, 2024; 4. "Overture" Released: July 5, 2024; 5. "7 Horses" Released: September 16, 2024

Like All Before You is the third studio album by the American band the Voidz, which was released on September 20, 2024. It was the band's first album in six years following 2018's Virtue.

== Background ==
This album is the band's first in six years and third overall, with their last being Virtue. It is also notably frontman Julian Casablancas's first project following his Grammy Award win for Best Rock Album with his other group, the Strokes, for their 2020 album The New Abnormal.

The title of the album was inspired by a conversation between Casablancas and the band's bassist and synth player, Jake Bercovici, where the latter said: "Soon we’ll all be crusted and dusted like all before us.”

== Recording ==
The album was recorded at the band's home studio in Venice, California, as well as at Vox Studios in Los Angeles. The band collaborated with producers Ivan Wayman, Justin Raisen, and Sadpony on several tracks.

== Release ==
The album's first single, "Prophecy of the Dragon" was released on May 26, 2023. On October 27, 2023, "Flexorcist" was released, along with an accompanying 14-minute-long music video that also served as the music video for "Prophecy of the Dragon". In the following year, on February 21, 2024, "All the Same" was released.

On July 4, 2024, a teaser was uploaded to the band's YouTube channel that announced the album and revealed its digital release date to be in September 2024, with further announcements detailing the album's physical vinyl release date and two live dates in Los Angeles and Harlem for October of that year. With this announcement, the band also quietly put out the instrumental single "Overture" on digital platforms. The album's final single, "7 Horses", was released on September 16, 2024.

Like All Before You was released on September 20, 2024.

== Reception ==
Professional ratings
Aggregate scores
Source	Rating
AnyDecentMusic?	5.6/10
Metacritic	59/100
Review scores
Source	Rating
AllMusic	2.5/5 stars
Clash	8/10
DIY	3/5 stars
Pitchfork	5.5/10
Rolling Stone	2.5/5 stars

The album was met with a mixed reception. According to the review aggregator Metacritic, Like All Before You received "mixed or average reviews" based on a weighted average score of 59 out of 100 from 10 critic scores. Clash gave the album an 8/10 score, describing the album as falling into the category of "unforced invention delivered with chilled ease", praising the tracklist's variety and mentioning that "while heaps of experimenting is on display, [...] the song is always at the centre". Rolling Stone rated the album two and a half stars, writing that "the record is the most unpredictable that the group [...] has recorded since it formed more than a decade ago", adding that it is "difficult to listen to the album as a whole". DIY gave the album a three star review but highlighted centrepiece 'Spectral Analysis', calling it "a total red herring (albeit a rather lovely one) amongst an album that sounds like an ‘80s video game version of the future." 'Flexorcist' also garnered praise as the catchiest track on the record.

=== AI artwork controversy ===
The band faced backlash with their use of AI artwork for the album's cover art, which was revealed via a post on Casablancas's Instagram page in July 2024. Later, under the post itself, the singer issued a statement defending the choice, which included the following excerpts:

"We [definitely] didn't go out of our way to use AI art. I just objectively– in the wilderness of the art out there– liked the image and we were working with several ideas and just all objectively collectively liked it best. [...] Sorry to the 'Scared of [New] Tools' tribe, truly sorry. But art plops up, best idea/image/noise in the end should win... and I'm not 'endorsing' AI, I don't dwell on it, but it's part of culture now. Relax, it's iPhone."

== Track listing ==
All tracks are written by Alex Carapetis, Amir Yaghmai, Jake Bercovici, Jeff Kite, Jeramy "Beardo" Gritter, and Julian Casablancas. All tracks produced by Ivan Wayman and Justin Raisen, except where noted.

Like All Before You track listing
No.	Title	Producers	Length
1.	"Overture"		1:10
2.	"Square Wave"		5:26
3.	"Prophecy of the Dragon"	Wayman; Raisen; Sadpony	4:53
4.	"7 Horses"		4:22
5.	"Spectral Analysis"	Wayman; Raisen; Sadpony	3:46
6.	"Flexorcist"	Wayman; Raisen; Sadpony	5:57
7.	"Perseverance–1C2S"		3:52
8.	"All the Same"	Wayman; Raisen; Sadpony	5:36
9.	"When Will the Time of These Bastards End"		5:51
10.	"Walk Off (Outro)"		1:04
Total length:			42:55

== Personnel ==
The Voidz

- The Voidz – words, music
- Julian Casablancas – vocals
- Amir Yaghmai – guitar
- Jeramy "Beardo" Gritter – guitar
- Jeff Kite – keyboards
- Jake Bercovici – bass, synthesizer
- Alex Carapetis – drums

Production staff

- Ivan Wayman – engineer, producer
- Justin Raisen – producer
- Ben Baptie – mixing, mastering
- Alana Da Fonseca – additional production
- Ethan Schneiderman – additional production
- Jason Lader – additional production
- Ray Aldoco – additional production
- Sadpony – additional production
- Sophie Ellis – additional production

Additional

- Dolorsilentium – cover artwork (AI)
- Day Stay Hay – additional artwork
- Kit Valo – additional artwork
- Pete Lacey – additional artwork
- Philippe Henssens – additional artwork
- Ric Evans – additional artwork
- Sudarshan Suwal – additional artwork
- Tobias Raschbacher – additional artwork
- Sarah Schmidt – design
- Cheryl Georgette – photography
