= Lucky No. 7 =

EP by Rey Pila
- Released: 26 September 2019
- Recorded: 2018–2019
- Studios: Sonic Ranch Studios (Tornillo, Texas)
- Genres: Indie rock, electronic rock, synthwave
- Length: 21:34
- Label: Arts & Crafts México
- Producers: Diego Solórzano, Ricardo Acasuso

Rey Pila chronology
Wall of Goth (2017)	Lucky No. 7 (2019)	Velox Veritas (2020)

Lucky No. 7 is an extended play (EP) by Mexican rock band Rey Pila, released on 26 September 2019, through Arts & Crafts México. The five-track EP was recorded at Sonic Ranch Studios in Tornillo, Texas, produced by Diego Solórzano with additional production and mixing by Ricardo Acasuso, and mastered by Brian Lucey at Magic Garden Mastering.

== Background and release ==
The EP followed a two-year gap after the band's 2017 release Wall of Goth. Its release coincided with high-profile live performances: Rey Pila were invited by French band Phoenix to support their *Ti Amo* residency at El Plaza Condesa in Mexico City, and were later chosen by The Cure to open their October 2019 concert at Foro Sol in Mexico City.

== Critical reception ==
Lucky No. 7 received favorable coverage from both Mexican and international outlets. UK's Clash described the EP as part of the band's return to form, highlighting its blend of synth-pop and rock textures. In Mexico, Me Hace Ruido praised its “eclectic energy” and “dark yet danceable soundscapes,” while IndieRocks! called it “a bridge between the past and future of Rey Pila’s sound, equally cinematic and raw.” Revista Marvin highlighted its nostalgic and retro-futurist qualities.

The single "Disciples IV" was listed in Mexico City's **Reactor 105.7 FM** annual countdown of the best songs of 2019, appearing at number 66.

== Track listing ==
All tracks are written by Diego Solórzano, Andrés Velasco and Rodrigo Blanco.

No.	Title	Length
1.	"Disciples IV"	3:35
2.	"Flames"	2:45
3.	"Anxious"	3:36
4.	"Come Over"	4:01
5.	"Lucky No. 7"	3:04
Total length:		17:02

== Credits ==
- Diego Solórzano – producer
- Ricardo Acasuso – additional production, mixing
- Brian Lucey – mastering
