= John Casablancas =

American modeling agent and scout (1942–2013)

- Born: December 12, 1942; New York City, New York, U.S.
- Died: July 20, 2013 (aged 70); Rio de Janeiro, Brazil
- Occupations: Model agent; entrepreneur
- Spouses: Marie Christine (m. 1965; div. 1970); Jeanette Christiansen (m. 1979; div. 1983); Aline Wermelinger (m. 1993)
- Children: 5, including Julian

John Casablancas (December 12, 1942 – July 20, 2013) was an American modeling agent and scout who founded Elite Model Management. He is credited with "inventing the supermodel". He was also the father of the Strokes frontman Julian Casablancas.

At age 42, while married to model Jeanette Christiansen, Casablancas was in a relationship with a 16-year-old girl, Stephanie Seymour. At age 50, Casablancas married his third wife, 17-year-old Aline Mendonça de Carvalho Wermelinger. In 2002, Casablancas was accused of sexual assault of a minor in a lawsuit by a former model.

Casablancas was friends with future U.S. president Donald Trump, representing Trump's daughter Ivanka when she became a fashion model at age 15. After he died in Rio De Janeiro, Brazil in 2013 at age 70, The Guardian published an obituary stating, "Casablancas was frank about his personal preference for girls of only just legal age – 'child women'." In 2020, The Guardian reported that he was connected to Jeffrey Epstein. According to a 2019 lawsuit, Casablancas sent a 15-year-old female model to meet a photographer later identified as Epstein, who sexually assaulted her.

== Early life ==
John Casablancas was born in Manhattan, New York City, on December 12, 1942. He was the youngest of three children of Fernando and Antonia Casablancas, a banker and former model, respectively, and grandson of Spanish textile machinery inventor Fernando Casablancas Planell. His parents had left Spain during the 1930s to escape the Spanish Civil War, and the family subsequently lived in the United States, Argentina, Mexico, and France, among other countries. At the age of 8, he began attending Le Rosey boarding school in Switzerland. He continued his education at several universities in Europe without graduating.

== Career ==
After pursuing several career options, Casablancas was offered a job in Brazil by a family friend to work as a marketing manager for a Coca-Cola factory. After several years he returned to Europe and worked at an architecture company. In collaboration with a fellow Le Rosey alumnus, Casablancas founded Elite Model Management, a modeling agency, in Paris in 1972. He had previously run the Paris-based agency Model Agency Elysée 3, which he founded in 1969. Clients of Elite included Cindy Crawford, Naomi Campbell, Linda Evangelista, Andie MacDowell and Claudia Schiffer. Casablancas is credited with "inventing the supermodel." He was also criticized for his habit of engaging in sexual activity with young and underage clients.

Grace Jones, in her autobiography, quotes Casablancas telling her "Trying to sell a black model in Paris, is like trying to sell an old car no one wants to buy." which she describes as industry discrimination.

During the years that Casablancas ran the operations, Elite grossed over $100 million in annual model bookings. It also generated controversy, with investigative reporter Donal MacIntyre making a BBC television exposé which resulted in the resignation of two Elite executives. Casablancas gave an "unconditional apology" for their behaviour. A sales director sued for unfair dismissal and was awarded $4.3 million. The annual Look of the Year events (later Elite Model Look), at which young women could win a $150,000 modeling contract with Elite, were later criticized by The Guardian newspaper for providing an opportunity for Casablancas and other judges such as David Copperfield and Donald Trump to proposition contestants. In 2003, the Los Angeles County Superior Court dismissed a case of sexual abuse brought against Casablancas by a former Look of the Year contestant because he was not a resident of California.

Having sold his shares in Elite in 2000, Casablancas set up the Star System management agency and Illusion 2K, a cyber model agency.

== Sexual misconduct ==
According to British newspaper The Guardian, "Casablancas was frank about his personal preference for girls of only just legal age – 'child women'. His relationships were far beyond complicated, though he denied the rumours that he had charmed entire portfolios of Elite employees into bed."

At the age of 42, Casablancas was in a relationship with 16-year-old Stephanie Seymour while he was married to model Jeanette Christiansen. In 1993, the 50-year-old Casablancas married his third wife, 17-year-old Aline Mendonça de Carvalho Wermelinger, winner of Elite Model Look 1992 in Brazil, who he had met as a schoolgirl. Wermelinger was close in age to Casablancas's children, who were 22 and 14 at the time. The couple had three children: John Jr., Fernando Augusto, and Nina.

In 2002, Casablancas was accused of sexual assault of a minor in a lawsuit by a former model.

There are allegations that financier and convicted sex offender Jeffrey Epstein had a connection to Casablancas during the 1990s. According to The Guardian, a lawsuit filed in the United States in 2019, alleged that in 1990 Casablancas sent a teenage model to what was described as her first casting call at a private residence on New York City's Upper East Side, where she was instructed to meet a photographer who was later identified as Epstein. According to the lawsuit, the model, who was 15 years old at the time, was ordered by Epstein to undress while he took photographs of her, pushed her against a wall and sexually assaulted her.

== Personal life and death ==
At age 22, Casablancas married Marie-Christine from France. The two lived in Rio de Janeiro for much of their marriage. Casablancas had one child with Marie-Christine, Cécile, who was born in 1969 in France. The two split soon after her birth.

In 1967, he met Jeanette Christiansen, a Danish model and the 1965 Miss Denmark, as well as the first model Casablancas ever represented. They married in 1979, the year after the birth of their son Julian, who would become lead vocalist of the American bands the Strokes and the Voidz. They divorced in 1983.

Casablancas was friends with Donald Trump, and Elite Model Management represented his daughter Ivanka when she became a fashion model at age 15.

A resident of Miami, Florida, Casablancas died on July 20, 2013, in Rio de Janeiro, where he had been receiving treatment for cancer. He was 70 years old.

== Media ==
- Casablancas: The Man Who Loved Women. 2016 documentary (81 minutes long) by Hubert Woroniecki.
