= Rey Pila (album) =

Studio album by Rey Pila
- Released: July 13, 2010
- Recorded: 2009–2010
- Genre: Indie rock, electronic rock
- Length: 37:59
- Label: OCESA Seitrack
- Producer: Paul Mahajan, Diego Solórzano

Rey Pila chronology
| Rey Pila (2010) | The Future Sugar (2015) |

Professional ratings
Review scores
| Source | Rating |
|---|---|
| Spin | (7/10) |
| Club Fonograma | 4/5 stars |

Rey Pila is the 2010 self-titled debut album by the Mexican rock band, Rey Pila. The album was recorded in New York City and co-produced by Diego Solórzano and Paul Mahajan at Hole in the Sky Studios. The album contains tracks in both English and Spanish, and featured singles "No Longer Fun" and "No. 114".

The Mexican edition of Rolling Stone magazine included the album in its Best Latin Albums of 2010 list.

== Track listing ==
1. "Sordo" – 3:32
2. "No Longer Fun" – 3:25
3. "Grenades" – 5:16
4. "Pictures of the Sun" – 3:33
5. "Gift" – 3:46
6. "The Lost Art of Crashing Cars" – 4:05
7. "No. 114" – 3:14
8. "Suspiria" – 3:50
9. "Apollo" – 3:34
10. "Our Project" – 3:44

== Personnel ==
- Diego Solórzano – vocals, guitars, bass, synths, loops, drums, percussion
- Paul Mahajan – additional synths, guitars and vocals
- Mateo González Bufi – additional guitar and chorus vocals on "Suspiria"
- Alejandra Moreno Dulche – chorus vocals on "No Longer Fun"
- Karla Sariñana – chorus vocals on "No Longer Fun"
- Daniela Sánchez – chorus vocals on "No Longer Fun"
- Sophia Jurewicz – chorus vocals on "Pictures of the Sun"
- Isabella Bower – chorus vocals on "Pictures of the Sun"
- Geezer – percussion on "Grenades"
