= Velox Veritas =

Studio album by Rey Pila
- Released: 21 August 2020
- Recorded: 2019–2020
- Studios: Sonic Ranch Studios (Tornillo, Texas)
- Genres: Indie rock, electronic rock, synthwave, synth-pop
- Length: 40:35
- Label: Arts & Crafts México
- Producers: Diego Solórzano, Dave Sitek

Rey Pila chronology
| Lucky No. 7 (2019) | Velox Veritas (2020) | E.P. (2022) |

Singles from Velox Veritas
- 1. "Let It Burn" Released: 7 May 2020; 2. "Casting a Shadow" Released: 18 June 2020; 3. "Drooling" Released: 15 July 2020

Professional ratings
Review scores
| Source | Rating |
|---|---|
| AllMusic | 3.5/5 stars |
| Clash | Positive |

Velox Veritas is the third full-length studio album by Mexican rock band Rey Pila, released on 21 August 2020 via Arts & Crafts México. The album was recorded at Sonic Ranch Studios in Texas, produced by Diego Solórzano with contributions from Dave Sitek of TV on the Radio, and features cover artwork by Mexican artist Dr. Lakra. The band was unable to tour or promote the record live due to the COVID-19 pandemic.

== Critical reception ==
International reception was generally positive. UK outlet Clash described Rey Pila as having “a unique sound, a cultural cross-exchange that matches stellar songwriting to a diverse palette of influences.” Ghettoblaster Magazine praised the record as “refreshing,” citing its electro-guitar hybrid sound. On release day, Talkhouse spotlighted the album in a feature on Mexican indie music.

Canadian magazine Exclaim! described it as "moderately catchy yet extremely busy," while praising the synth-driven production and the closing track "Steps (Pt. I)". In Mexico, Me Hace Ruido called it "a journey full of psychedelia, electricity, tropical touches and evocative nostalgia," IndieRocks! hailed it as "the most sincere and honest work" of the band, and Revista Marvin praised its circular narrative and cinematic qualities. At the end of 2020, Rolling Stone México listed it among the best albums of the year. The single "Let It Burn" was also included in Reactor 105.7 FM’s year-end list of best songs, appearing at number 85.

== Track listing ==
All tracks are written by Diego Solórzano, Andrés Velasco and Rodrigo Blanco.

| No. | Title | Length |
|---|---|---|
| 1. | "Let It Burn" | 3:08 |
| 2. | "Dark Paradise" | 4:03 |
| 3. | "My Friends Are Going Crazy" | 3:37 |
| 4. | "Drooling" | 3:39 |
| 5. | "Casting a Shadow" | 3:35 |
| 6. | "Steps, Pt. 2" | 4:01 |
| 7. | "Lash Out" | 3:13 |
| 8. | "Josephine" | 3:14 |
| 9. | "Over the Edge" | 3:52 |
| 10. | "Danger" | 3:36 |
| 11. | "Steps, Pt. 1" | 4:31 |
| Total length: | | 40:35 |

== Credits ==
- Diego Solórzano – producer
- Dave Sitek – producer, mixing
- Ricardo Acasuso – engineering, mixing
- Brian Lucey – mastering
- John Greenham - mastering
- Dr. Lakra – artwork
