= Wall of Goth =

EP by Rey Pila
- Released: 28 April 2017
- Recorded: 2016
- Genre: Indie rock; synth-pop; synthwave; new wave
- Length: 14:59
- Label: Cult
- Producer: Julian Casablancas; Shawn Everett; Diego Solórzano

Rey Pila chronology
The Future Sugar (2015)	Wall of Goth (2017)	Lucky No. 7 (2019)

Singles from Wall of Goth
- 1. "Ninjas" Released: 10 March 2017; 2. "How Do You Know?" Released: 12 April 2017

Wall of Goth is an EP by Mexican rock band Rey Pila, released on April 28, 2017 via Cult Records.

== Track listing ==
All tracks are written by Diego Solórzano, Andrés Velasco, Rodrigo Blanco and Miguel Hernández.

No.	Title	Length
1.	"How Do You Know?"	3:26
2.	"Ninjas"	3:05
3.	"Sunday Games"	4:04
4.	"No Man's Land"	4:24
Total length:		14:59

== Credits ==
- Julian Casablancas – producer
- Diego Solórzano – producer
- Shawn Everett – producer
- Chris Tabron – mixer
- Dave Kutch – mastering
- Liz Hirsch – artwork
