= Alexander (song) =

Single by Rey Pila
- Released: October 15, 2013
- Genre: Indie rock, electronic rock
- Label: Cult Records
- Songwriter: Diego Solórzano / Andrés Velasco / Rodrigo Blanco
- Producer: Chris Coady

"Alexander" is the debut single by Mexican rock band Rey Pila, released in 2013 on 7-inch vinyl and digital formats by Cult Records. It was produced by Chris Coady at DFA Studios in New York City.

The single's B-side is a cover version of Chris de Burgh's "Lady in Red". It was recorded in Topetitud Studios in Mexico City, and produced by Rey Pila and mixed by Shawn Everett in New York City.

== Track listing ==
No.	Title	Length
1.	"Alexander"	3:30
2.	"Lady in Red"	4:12
