= Jeff Kite =

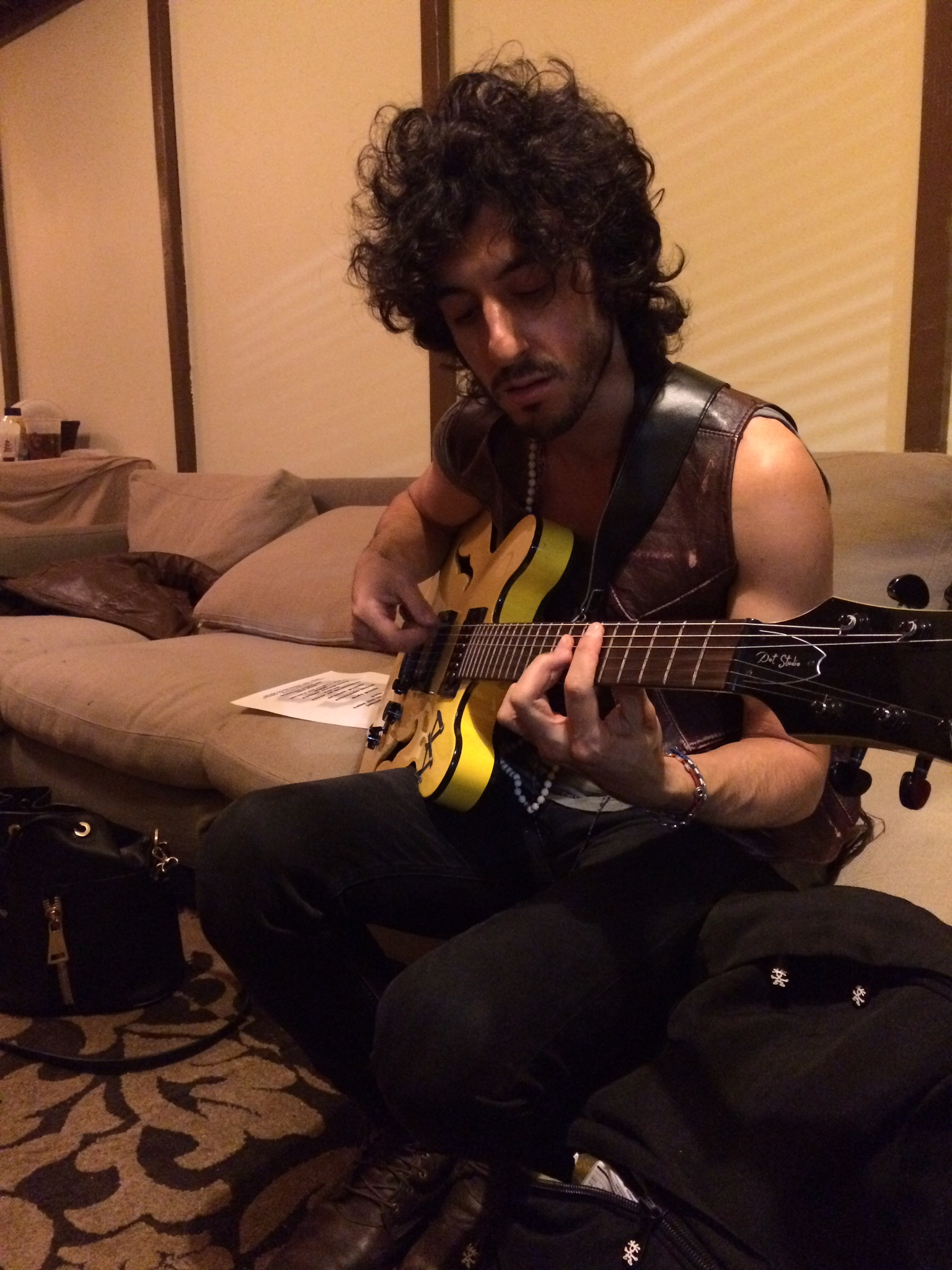
- Jeff Kite backstage in Philadelphia.

Background information
- Born: Jeffrey Alan Kite; March 19, 1979 (age 47)
- Origin: Chicago, Illinois
- Genres: Rock; indie rock; new wave; punk rock; film score
- Occupations: Keyboardist; songwriter; composer
- Instruments: Keyboards; synthesizers; guitar; drums
- Labels: Cult Records, RCA Records, Mom + Pop Music, Terrible Records, Mr. Bongo Records
- Member of: The Voidz; Beat Club; Vicky Cryer; Coastal Kites

Jeff Kite (born March 19, 1979) is an American musician, composer, producer and member of the band, The Voidz.

== Career ==
=== Julian Casablancas (Phrazes for the Young) ===
In 2009, Julian Casablancas released his debut solo record, Phrazes for the Young. Kite joined Casablancas’ touring band, The Sick Six, as a keyboard and guitar player. Between tours, he began writing new songs with Casablancas and drummer, Alex Carapetis, in a studio in New York City. Many of their demos eventually became songs on the debut Voidz album, Tyranny.

=== The Voidz ===
After touring extensively with Julian Casablancas in 2009, Jeff once again joined forces with The Strokes frontman on his new project, The Voidz. They began recording their debut album, Tyranny, in 2013 in New York City. The album was released on September 23, 2014. The first single to be released was the 11 minute song, “Human Sadness”. Included with the song’s release was a music video co-directed by Warren Fu and Nicholuas Goossen. The second single that the band released was, “Where No Eagles Fly”. They performed the song on The Tonight Show and Le Gran Journal. Tyranny peaked inside the US Top 40 albums chart at No. 39.

In December 2017, the band announced a name change from "Julian Casablancas + The Voidz" to "The Voidz".

Virtue is the second studio album by The Voidz. This time the band recorded in Los Angeles. It was released on March 30, 2018, through Cult Records and RCA. “Leave It In My Dreams,” was the first single to be released and they performed the song on The Tonight Show Starring Jimmy Fallon. The band toured extensively and appeared on several late night shows to promote the album.

In 2019, The Voidz collaborated with Mac DeMarco who produced two songs, “Did My Best” and “T.E.T” that were released on Terrible Records. T.E.T was used as the theme song for The Mets 2021 MLB season.

In late 2020, The Voidz premiered a new song "Alien Crime Lord" in the video game Grand Theft Auto V.

Their new album "Like All Before You" will be released in September 2024.

=== Cigarettes After Sex ===
In 2020, Jeff began performing periodically with Cigarettes After Sex. In 2021, he joined them in the studio to record keyboards for the songs that comprise their 2024 album, X’s. He also appears on their 2023 single, “Pistol” and their 2024 single “Tejano Blue”.

=== Studio Work ===
In 2013, Jeff worked in the studio on Vicky Cryer's debut release, The Synthetic Love of Emotional Engineering. Vicky Cryer is helmed by Jason Hill (of Louis XIV). Also recruited for the project was current drummer for The Voidz, Alex Carapetis, along with Dominic Howard (of Muse), Mark Stoermer (of The Killers), Nick Fyffe (of Jamiroquai) and Dave Elitch (of Mars Volta).

He is currently the producer and keyboardist in the instrumental trio, Coastal Kites.

=== Beat Club ===
Jeff was the lead vocalist and keyboardist in Beat Club. Their first single, 'Something Better,' was released in February 2013 on Boombox Recordings (PCM/Mom+Pop). In Fall 2013, Beat Club toured the US with Fitz and the Tantrums and Capital Cities. In February 2016, Noisey released the band's the single, 'New Age Kid,' citing the tracks 'psych-pop swagger' and the 'Lennon-lean of his [Kite's] voice.'

=== Film Work ===
In 2008, Jeff Kite composed the score for No Subtitles Necessary, a film that follows the lives of renowned cinematographers László Kovacs and Vilmos Zsigmond as they escape from the 1956 Soviet invasion of Hungary to present day. It premiered at the 2008 Cannes International Film Festival and was a part of the Independent Lens series on PBS. He also composed music for the documentary, Rio Breaks; a film that explores surfing and slum-life in Rio de Janeiro. The soundtrack was released on Mr. Bongo Records.
