= Tyranny (The Voidz album) =

Studio album by Julian Casablancas + The Voidz
- Released: September 23, 2014
- Recorded: 2013–2014
- Studios: Labyrinth, NYC
- Genres: Electronica; progressive rock
- Length: 63:09
- Label: Cult
- Producer: Shawn Everett

The Voidz chronology
Tyranny (2014)	Virtue (2018)

Alternate album cover

Singles from Tyranny
- 1. "Human Sadness" Released: September 2, 2014; 2. "Where No Eagles Fly" Released: September 9, 2014; 3. "M.utually A.ssured D.estruction" Released: 2014 (Promo)

Tyranny is the debut studio album by the American rock band the Voidz (marketed as Julian Casablancas + The Voidz), released on September 23, 2014, through the Cult label. The album was recorded at Labyrinth, NYC, and produced by Shawn Everett.

The first single from the album, the 11-minute track "Human Sadness", was released on September 2, 2014. The second single "Where No Eagles Fly" was released on September 9, 2014, with its music video being directed by guitarist Jeramy "Beardo" Gritter. After the album's release, the track "M.utually A.ssured D.estruction" was released as a promotional single. The album was placed 50th in NME's "Top 50 Albums of 2014" list.

== Reception ==
Professional ratings
Aggregate scores
Source	Rating
Metacritic	66/100
Review scores
Source	Rating
AllMusic	3/5 stars
Clash	(7/10)
Consequence	Favorable
Drowned in Sound	(9.75/10)
Exclaim!	(8/10)
The Line of Best Fit	(6.5/10)
NME	(6/10)
Paste	(6/10)
Pitchfork	(4.9/10)
Rolling Stone	3.5/5 stars

The album received generally positive reviews, though outlets often expressed mixed opinions. Rolling Stone gave the album 3.5 stars, calling it "the sound of a man shedding his skin. Not pretty, but more compelling for it." Paste gave it 6.0, while Exclaim! gave it 8 out of 10, calling it "a seriously sad album...compelling." Lucas Villa of AXS awarded four out of five stars, writing, "Casablancas continues to exercise his experimental muscle in the most raucous ways with The Voidz in tow." Benji Taylor of Clash gave the album 7/10, calling it "a weirdly wonderful mesh of awkward time signatures, unconventional song structures and, in general, unbridled madness". Pitchfork was among the most negative of the reviewers, giving the album a 4.9 and calling it unlistenable and a failure.

GQ printed in a 2014 interview with Casablancas entitled, "Julian Casablancas Is Done Trying to Save You",

The record's called Tyranny, and that's sort of what it's about, Casablancas says: rapacious oil companies and a not-so-free press and environmental depredation. Money. Health care. Nightmares. The moon. "It's not very sexy to talk about these things, especially in a place like America, where things are, like, the best. But it just feels like we’re inside that Versailles bubble, you know?"

== Track listing ==
All tracks are written by Julian Casablancas, with additional writers noted. All music arranged by the Voidz.

Tyranny track listing
No.	Title	Writer(s)	Length
1.	"Take Me in Your Army"	Jake Bercovici	4:21
2.	"Crunch Punch"		4:51
3.	"M.utually A.ssured D.estruction"		2:33
4.	"Human Sadness"	Alex Carapetis	10:57
5.	"Where No Eagles Fly"	Bercovici	3:44
6.	"Father Electricity"		7:24
7.	"Johan Von Bronx"		6:01
8.	"Business Dog"	Jeramy Gritter	2:35
9.	"Xerox"		5:05
10.	"Dare I Care"		6:25
11.	"Nintendo Blood"	Jason Lader	5:55
12.	"Off to War..."		3:18
Total length:			63:09

== Personnel ==
Credits are adapted from the album's liner notes.

The Voidz

- Julian Casablancas – vocals
- Jeramy "Beardo" Gritter – guitar
- Amir Yaghmai – guitar
- Jacob "Jake" Bercovici – bass guitar, synthesizers
- Alex Carapetis – drums, percussion
- Jeff Kite – keyboards

Technical personnel

- Shawn Everett – production, mixing, recording
- Alana Da Fonseca – additional engineering
- Ryan Fagman – additional engineering on "Dare I Care", "Xerox", "Nintendo Blood" and "Crunch Punch"
- Brian Gardner – mastering at Bernie Grundman Mastering, LA
- Dave Kutch – additional mastering at The Mastering Palace, NYC
- Emily Lazar – additional mastering at The Lodge, NYC

Additional musicians

- J. P. Bowersock – guru for "Crunch Punch", "Human Sadness" and "Take Me in Your Army"
- Mike Bloom – additional guitar on "Dare I Care"
- Jason Lader – co-writer on "Nintendo Blood"

Artwork and photography

- Warren Fu – artwork
- Liz Hirsch – artwork
- Sam Adoquei – "The Visit of Govindu" artwork
- El Teneen – "Chessboard" artwork
- Colin Lane – photography

Management

- Richard Priest – management crew
- Lysee Webb – management crew
- Jack Rovner – management crew
- Julie Bernouis – assistant manager

== Charts ==
Chart (2014)	Peak position
Belgian Albums (Ultratop Flanders)	176
Belgian Albums (Ultratop Wallonia)	128
French Albums (SNEP)	90
US Billboard 200	39
US Billboard Alternative Albums	2
US Billboard Rock Albums	10
