= Julian Casablancas =

American singer (born 1978)

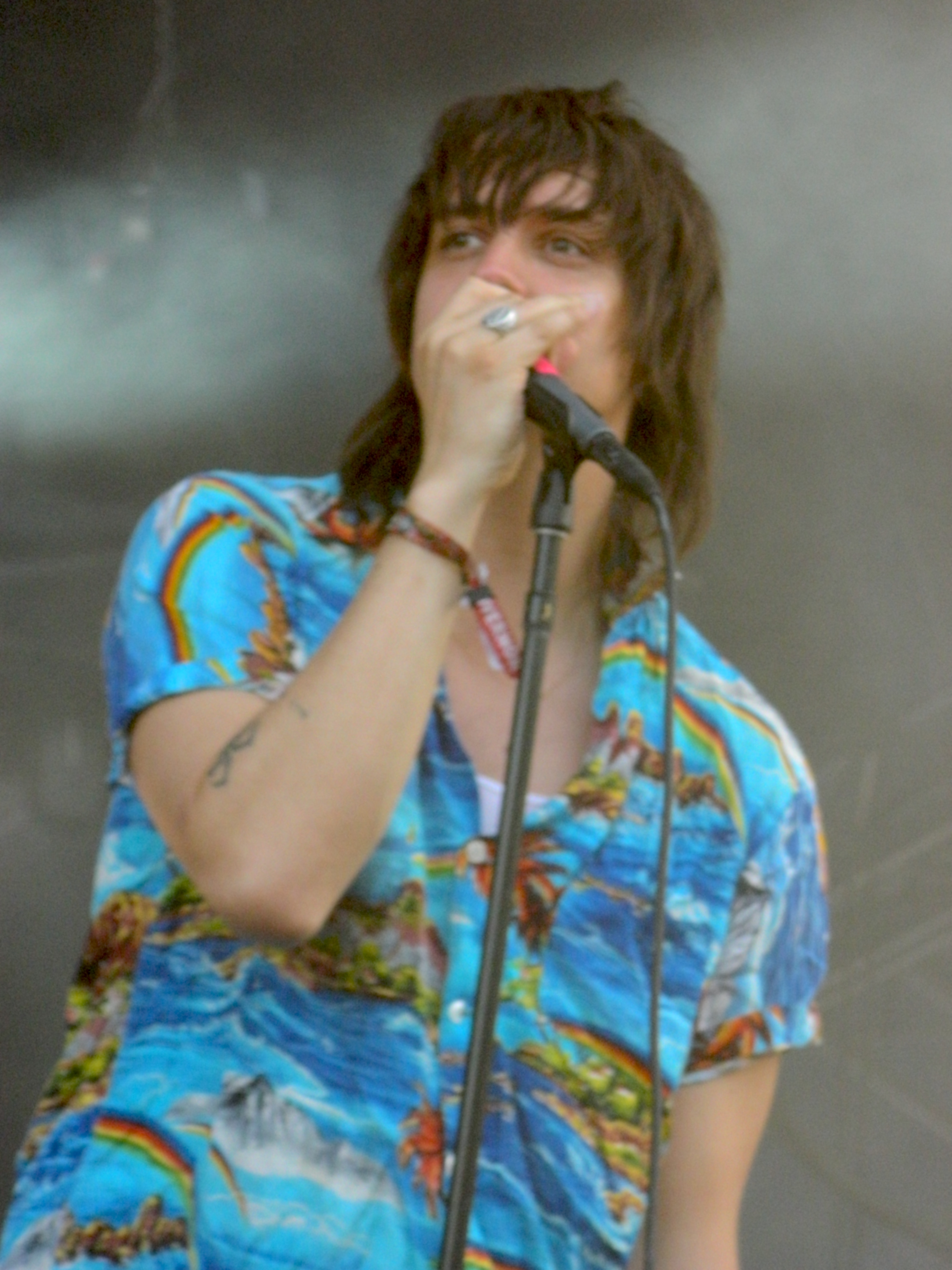
- Casablancas in 2014
- Born: Julian Fernando Casablancas; August 23, 1978 (age 48); Upper East Side, Manhattan New York City, New York, U.S.
- Occupations: Singer; songwriter; musician
- Years active: 1998–present
- Spouse: Juliet Joslin (m. 2005; div. 2019)
- Children: 2
- Father: John Casablancas
- Musical career
- Genres: Indie rock; post-punk revival; garage rock revival; new wave; experimental rock; neo-psychedelia
- Instrument: Vocals
- Labels: Rough Trade; RCA; Cult Records
- Member of: The Strokes; The Voidz
- Website: juliancasablancas.com

Julian Fernando Casablancas (born August 23, 1978) is an American musician. He is the lead vocalist and primary songwriter of the rock band The Strokes, with which he has released seven studio albums since its founding in 1998. Casablancas released a solo studio album, Phrazes for the Young, in 2009, and has released three albums with the experimental rock band the Voidz.

The Strokes' debut album Is This It was critically acclaimed, and launched Casablancas and the band to rock stardom. Casablancas was the primary songwriter and creative voice behind the band's early albums, including 2003's Room on Fire and 2006's First Impressions of Earth. After a six-year hiatus, the Strokes released Angles in 2011 and Comedown Machine in 2013 with the band taking a more collaborative approach to these projects. Casablancas would not record another record with the band until 2020's Grammy-winning The New Abnormal, the first such nomination or win for the band.

In 2009, during a hiatus from the Strokes, Casablancas released his debut solo album, Phrazes for the Young. In the same year he founded the independent record label Cult Records, which has represented artists the Growlers, Rey Pila and Karen O.

Since 2014 he has been the frontman of experimental rock band The Voidz, endeavoring to make less commercial music and explore new themes. The Voidz have released three studio albums.

== Early life ==
Julian Fernando Casablancas was born in Upper East Side, Manhattan in New York City on August 23, 1978, where he was raised, the son of American-Spanish businessman John Casablancas, the founder of Elite Model Management, and Jeanette Christiansen (née Christjansen), a Danish model and the 1965 Miss Denmark who later became an artist. When Casablancas was eight, his parents divorced. He said that he wanted to be closer to his father, which "translated into teenage rebelliousness". His mother later married Ghanaian painter Sam Adoquei, who helped shape Casablancas musically by exposing him to music like the Doors, which was markedly different from the mostly Phil Collins-influenced music he listened to as a child. Prior to becoming a musician, he aspired to play professional basketball.

Casablancas has several half-siblings, including an elder from his father's first marriage and three younger half-siblings from his father's fourth marriage. Casablancas met future Strokes bassist Nikolai Fraiture when they were six years old, while they both attended the bilingual French school Lycée Français de New York. When he was 13, his father sent him to the Institut Le Rosey boarding school in Switzerland, to improve his grades. Casablancas later returned to New York City and attended Dwight School with two other future Strokes bandmates: guitarist Nick Valensi and drummer Fabrizio Moretti. Casablancas never finished high school, but took the GED and enrolled in music classes at Five Towns College, which he later said was the first time that he enjoyed himself in class. He later attended Adelphi University, which he graduated from in 2001, studying with Pulitzer Prize-winning composer Paul Moravec.

== Career ==
=== The Strokes (1998–present) ===
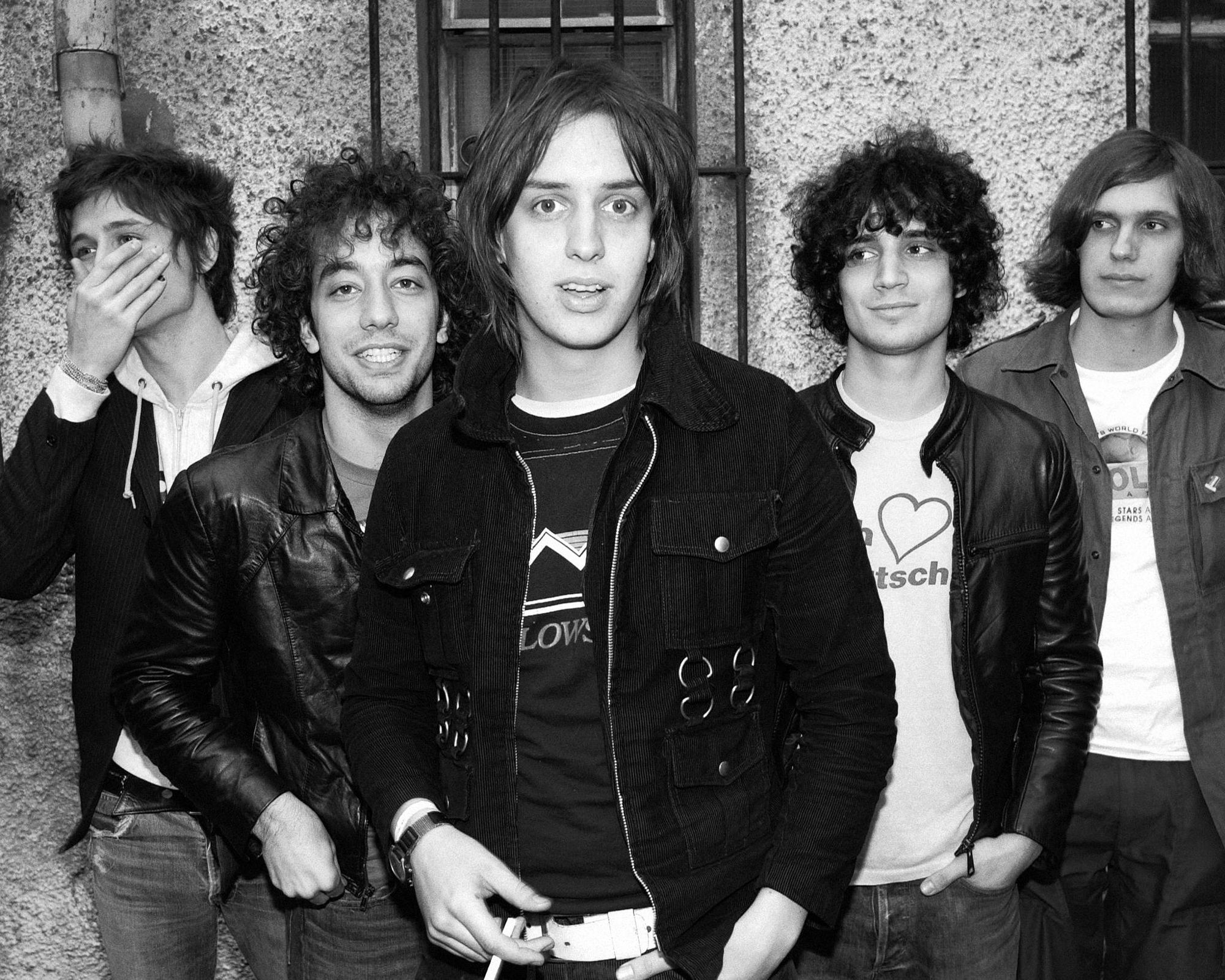
Casablancas with the Strokes in 2002

After meeting future guitarist Nick Valensi and drummer Fab Moretti at Dwight School in Manhattan, Casablancas began to play music with them. He reconnected with guitarist Albert Hammond Jr. when the latter moved to New York. The band was formed in 1998 when Hammond was accepted into the band, with Casablancas as the lead vocalist and main songwriter and Nikolai Fraiture on bass.

The band began rehearsing a fourteen-song set which included "Alone, Together", "Barely Legal", "Last Nite", "The Modern Age", "New York City Cops", "Soma", "Someday", "Take It or Leave It" and "This Life" (an early version of "Trying Your Luck"). Most of these songs now feature different lyrics. A demo sent to the newly reformed Rough Trade Records in the UK sparked interest there, leading to their first release via the website of the UK magazine NME, who gave away a free mp3 download of "Last Nite" a week prior to the physical release as part of The Modern Age EP in 2001. The EP sparked a bidding war among record labels, the largest for a rock and roll band in years. Shortly after, the Strokes' critically acclaimed debut album Is This It was released.

The band received high praise for Is This It, setting the stage for what people expected would "save rock" in the new millennium. Though some would argue that such statements left unreasonably sized shoes to fill, the Strokes are still highly recognized as one of the most influential garage rock bands of the early 2000s, paving the way for many alternative bands to come.

However, the group found it difficult to replicate their early critical success. In an excerpt from Lizzie Goodman's Meet Me in the Bathroom: Rebirth and Rock and Roll in New York City, 2001–2011 – named after the Strokes' track – Strokes guitarist Albert Hammond Jr. comments, "With Room on Fire [2003], people were giving us sh_ because they said we were sounding too much the same. With the third album [First Impressions of Earth], we were getting sh_ that we don't sound like Room on Fire. We got __ by the same thing twice!"

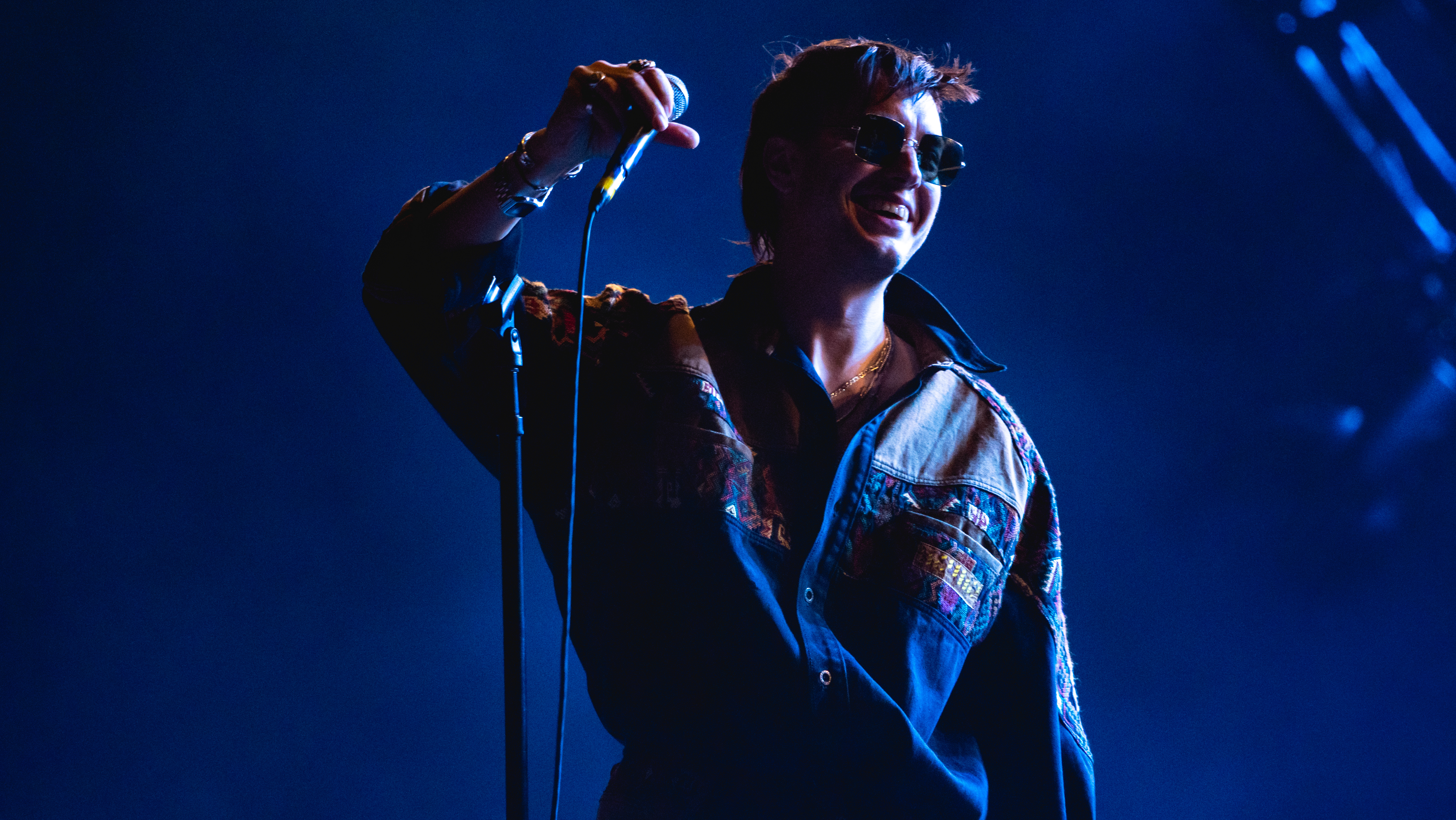
Casablancas performing with the Strokes on New Year's Eve 2019

After the release of the two other albums and several major tours, the band took a five-year break, returning with their fourth album, Angles, in 2011. The five-year hiatus was said to be the result of conflicting solo projects, sobriety issues, and unspoken emotions. The Strokes' drummer Fab Moretti said the band struggled to process such "subconscious volcanic emotions", partly because they were still "children" at the time.

Although their creative processes have been critiqued by outside observers as "a democracy under a dictator", Casablancas said in 2010 that the band was moving "more in the direction of everyone being equal." Commenting on Casablancas' creative process, guitarist Nick Valensi has said, "his ear is so sharp. He's the one with the ear for detail in this band. Creatively, he is a force to be reckoned with." The 2011 release, Angles, is said to reflect the beginning of the more collaborative nature of the band's creative process.

The album release was followed by several headlining appearances at musical festivals, including Reading, Coachella, Lollapalooza and Austin City Limits. The band released Comedown Machine in 2013, as their last album under the contract with long-time label RCA, for which they did no promotion. The band released an EP, Future Present Past, on Casablancas' own label Cult Records in 2016.

In December 2018, it was announced that the band would headline at Bilbao BBK Live in 2019, kicking off their global comeback. Numerous dates for festivals and shows were subsequently announced, including a show at the Governors Ball Music Festival, marking the band's return to New York City.

Starting May 14, 2019, the Strokes teased some new songs, starting with "The Adults are Talking", live at The Wiltern in Los Angeles, suggesting that the Strokes might release a new album. On December 31, 2019, at Brooklyn NYE, they performed "Ode to the Mets" as an offer from Casablancas to sing live instead of singing songs from Angles as requested by fans. "I don't remember Angles. What's Angles?" Casablancas responded before suggesting that the band play the new song and later confirming the release of a new project.

The band released the album The New Abnormal in April 2020, though writing sessions for songs on the album started as early as 2016. The following year, there was rumors that they were working with Rick Rubin for a new album, however Albert Hammond Jr. said they were only presenting ideas to him. However, he would eventually end up producing the album. It was their first full-length album since Comedown Machine. The album won the band their first Grammy Award, receiving the award for Best Rock Album. The album received positive reviews from critics, suggesting that the band came back with more maturity and better cohesion among the bandmates. On July 24th, 2026, The Strokes released their 7th LP "Reality Awaits"

=== Cult Records ===
In 2009, Casablancas founded Cult Records, the creative imprint for his solo album Phrazes for the Young. The label signed a partnership agreement with Kobalt Label Services in 2014, which includes representation and product management, physical distribution across multiple territories, digital distribution through AWAL, marketing and sync licensing services. As of 2026, Cult Records currently represents the Growlers, Har Mar Superstar, Songhoy Blues, Rey Pila, Karen O, Promiseland, the Strokes, the Voidz, Exhibition and Cerebral Ballzy. The label has also released works of Albert Hammond Jr., the Virgins, Reputante, INHEAVEN, Exclamation Pony and Nelson London (C O L O R).

Casablancas served as a co-producer on Rey Pila's album released on Cult, The Future Sugar. In August 2016, Cult Records announced a new album with the Growlers, a Southern California-based band. It was also announced that Casablancas himself was producing the album, later known as City Club.

=== Solo projects (2009–present) ===
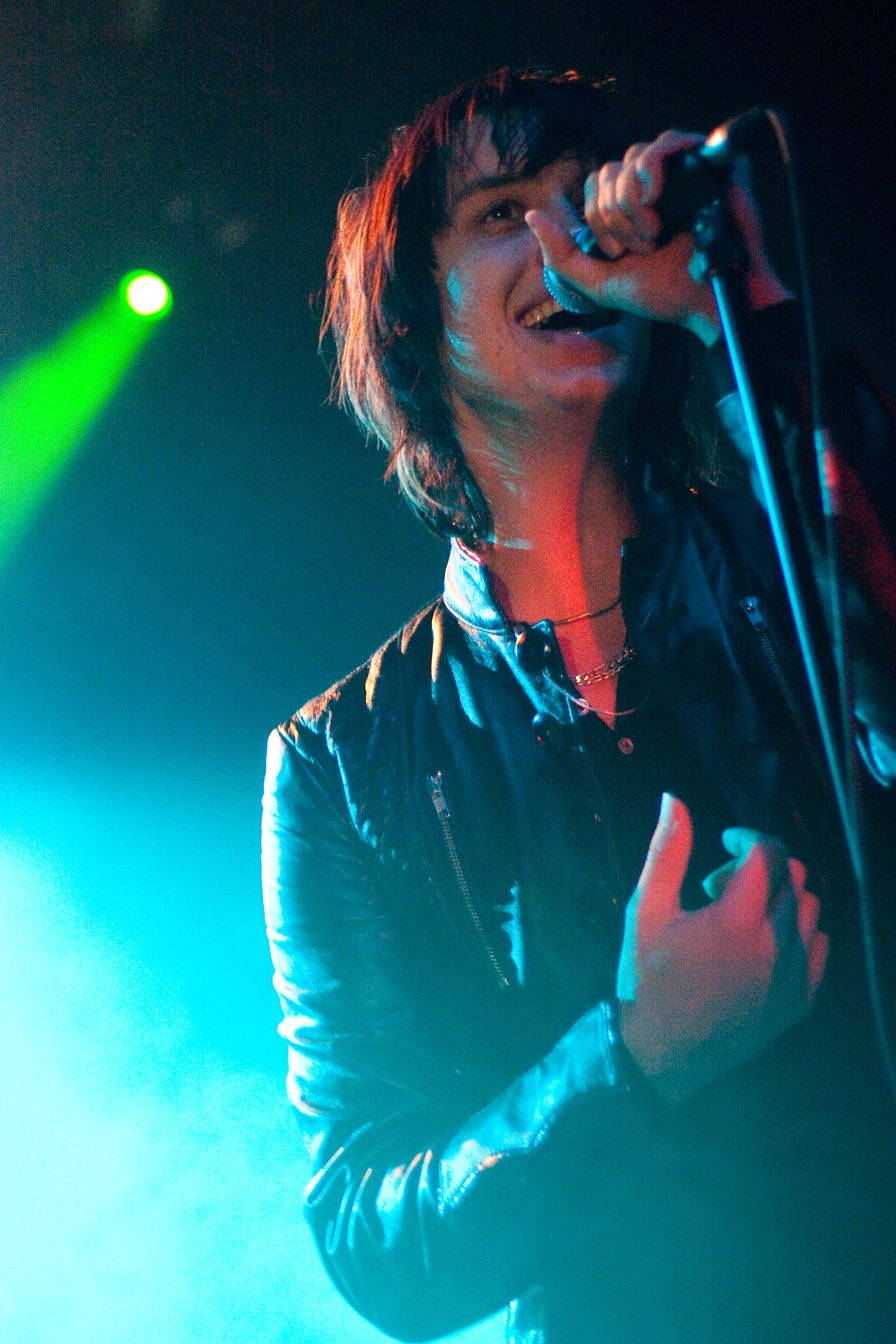
Casablancas performing in November 2009

As a solo artist, Casablancas set out with an intention to say what was on his mind, both musically and lyrically. Speaking on his experience as a solo artist versus releasing music with the Strokes, the singer has put it simply, "it's like touring with me or with five of me," meaning that each member has their own opinionated state of mind. While such statements raised much concern for the relations between the band members, Casablancas says that in pursuit of a solo career, he is protecting the integrity of the [Strokes] vibe. In having a musical project separate from the Strokes, he is able to "chase down any idea [he] wants", which he would refrain from doing with the band.

His first solo album, Phrazes for the Young (inspired by the Oscar Wilde book "Phrases and Philosophies for the Use of the Young"), was released on November 2 in the UK and November 3, 2009, in the United States. Recorded in Omaha, Nebraska, and New York, the album was produced by Jason Lader, with additional production from Bright Eyes' Mike Mogis. The album was strongly influenced by new wave and electronica, with Casablancas utilizing synthesizers for many songs. He discussed his new styling by saying "I would've gone weirder with the music, but I wanted to be smart. I didn't want people to say, 'Okay, this is his weird abstract thing,' and dismiss the album. I worked too hard on it for that to happen... I wanted to be crazy original and bridge the gap between traditional music and modern music."

Julian Casablancas made his live solo debut for a private party for the introduction of a fashion brand in Tokyo. To celebrate the release of the EP, he performed a series of shows in October 2009 at The Downtown Palace Theatre in Los Angeles with his live show band, the Sick Six. Members of the band included Jeff Kite (keyboard), Nelson London (synthesizer), JP Bowersock (guitar), Danielle Haim (percussion) and Alex Carapetis (drums). Casablancas then toured with the Sick Six in Europe, United States, Australia, and Japan from November 2009 until July 2010.

Casablancas composed the original song "I Like the Night" as part of his endorsement deal to represent Azzaro's new men's fragrance Decibel, dB. The Azzaro Decibel television commercial featuring Julian aired in France on September 1, 2011. He hosted a monthly music show Culture Void on Sirius XMU between May 2016 and February 2017, where he curated and shared some music across genres.

=== The Voidz (2013–present) ===
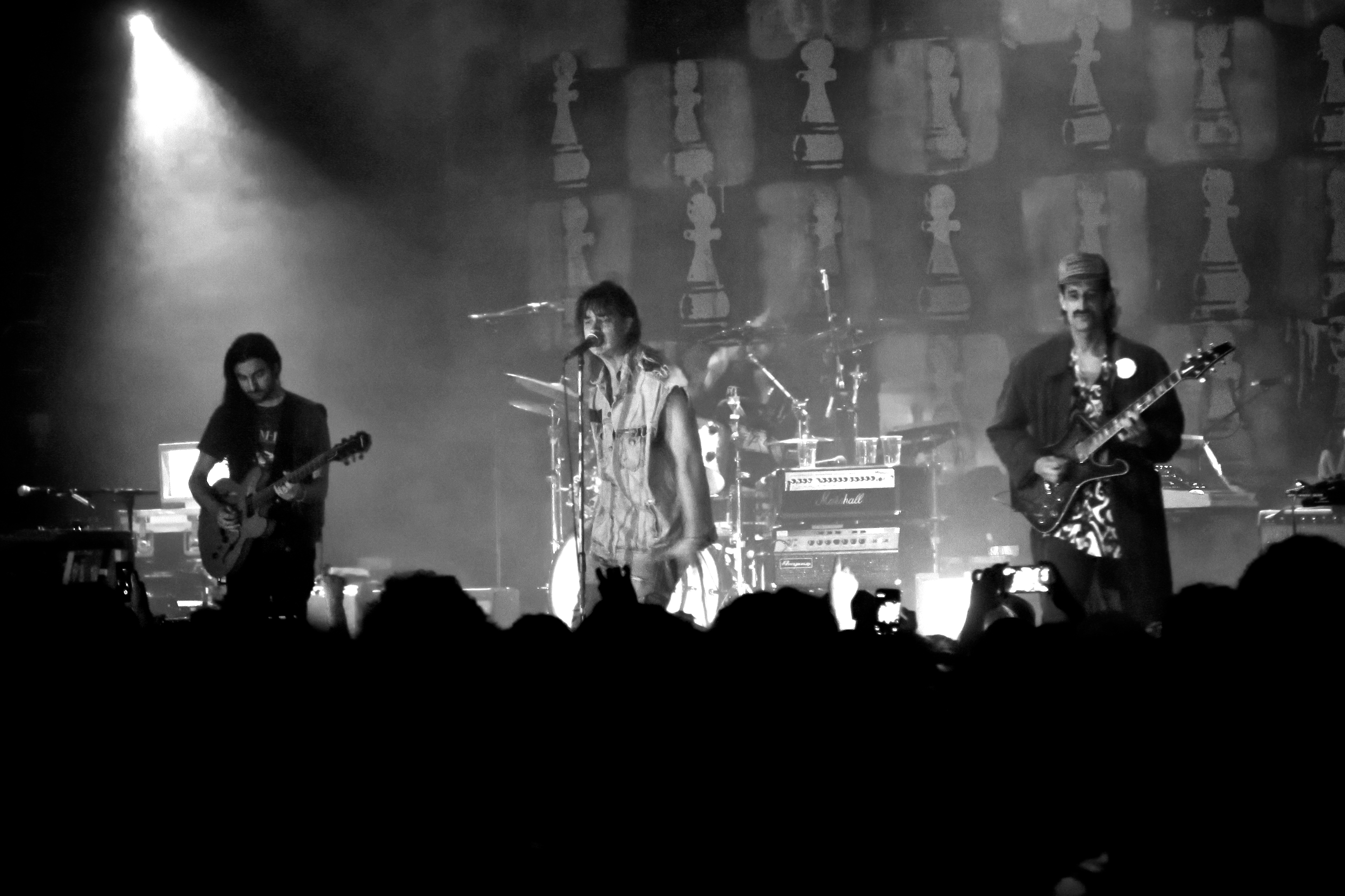
Julian Casablancas + the Voidz performing at The Coronet in London, December 2014

The Voidz, formerly known as Julian Casablancas + the Voidz, was formed in 2013. Along with Casablancas as lead vocalist, the band consists of Jeramy "Beardo" Gritter and Amir Yaghmai on guitar, Jacob "Jake" Bercovici on bass (as well as synthesizer), Alex Carapetis on drums and percussion, and Jeff Kite on keyboard. Wanting to earn a greater sense of respect as a band, rather than be perceived as a "side-project" of Julian's, the band officially changed their name from "Julian Casablancas + the Voidz" to simply "the Voidz" during an 'initiation' video on the band's YouTube page on December 8, 2017. Julian performed with Carapetis and Kite throughout the tour for his solo album, Phrazes for the Young. Through Carapetis, Casablancas met Gritter and Bercovici. Bercovici, having played music with Yaghmai for several of years, then connected him to Casablancas, forming what is now known as the Voidz.

Though the band's sound has not always been well received, the Voidz aim to "bridge the gap" between music that is both aggressive and complex. They share the goal of "representing things unseen" and "exploring [music] from the margins", as Jake [Bercovici] has said. Inspired by the complex nature of Middle Eastern music scales, Casablancas says he is more interested in "the in between notes" than the traditional seven note scale of Western music. The band is bound by a mutual love for powerful music that does not gain much attention in mainstream media, which is embodied in Julian's record company, Cult Records, as well. Casablancas says his work with the Voidz is simply an "evolution of the same mission" [as with the Strokes], but the Voidz are more aligned with the type of music with which he would like to experiment, moving forward. Though the Voidz remain a more active musical entity, both bands are still currently represented under Cult Records.

In June 2014, Casablancas announced he would be releasing the debut album Tyranny. The album was released on his own label Cult Records and coincided with his move to Upstate New York. On September 23, 2014, the album was released, followed by a tour in the United States and United Kingdom. The album features the 11-minute single "Human Sadness", a song whose demo was originally composed for the soundtrack of The Unseen Beauty, a short documentary film which profiled Casablancas' stepfather, artist Sam Adoquei. The group revealed dates for a South American tour in August 2017.

On March 30, 2018, the Voidz released their second album, titled Virtue. The album takes on a more political stance, dissecting universal concepts such as the paradox between what is perceived as "truth" and "lies", when taking multiple perceptual view points into consideration. The album features track, "Pyramid of Bones", which was featured on Adult Swim in April 2018, along with their single "Coul as a Ghoul" on the Adult Swim's Singles Program.

The Voidz released their third album Like All Before You on September 20, 2024. The album's themes were once again political in nature with Casablancas seeking to fuse experimental sounds and ideas with pop hooks. On July 31, 2025, they released a new four-track EP 'Megz of Ram'. The EP was recorded in the same East Village basement where Is This It first took shape.

=== Collaborations ===
Casablancas, along with the Strokes, provided vocals on a cover of Marvin Gaye's "Mercy Mercy Me (The Ecology)" with Joshua Homme on drums and Eddie Vedder on backup vocals. The cover was released in 2006 as the B-side to "You Only Live Once". Casablancas also provided bass guitar and backing vocals on Albert Hammond, Jr.'s "Scared" on his solo album Yours to Keep. He subsequently played a Casio guitar and provided backing vocals on "Sick, Sick, Sick" by Queens of the Stone Age.

In 2008, he recorded a song with Santigold (then known as Santogold) and Pharrell of N*E*R*D titled "My Drive Thru" for a Converse advertising campaign. During his solo phase, he recorded "Boombox" with Andy Samberg, Jorma Taccone, and Akiva Schaffer of the Lonely Island for their 2009 debut album Incredibad, and was featured in an SNL Digital Short for the same song. In addition, he also recorded "I Wish It Was Christmas Today", a festive song based on a Saturday Night Live skit made popular by Jimmy Fallon, Horatio Sanz, Chris Kattan and Tracy Morgan. Casablancas performed the song live on Late Night with Jimmy Fallon on December 21, 2009, together with the Roots, Horatio Sanz and Jimmy Fallon. He also appeared in the 100th Digital Short, which aired on May 12, 2012.

Casablancas also collaborated with Danger Mouse and Sparklehorse on the song "Little Girl" on the 2010 album, Dark Night of the Soul, contributing the lyrics, lead and backing vocals, and guitar solo. Aside from vocal collaborations, he also contributed to the song "Forrest Gump" on Digitalism's sophomore album I Love You, Dude in 2011. The electronica duo initiated a collaboration with Casablancas through his manager, and Casablancas contributed 'a 30-second recording with him on guitar' via email.

Casablancas also lent his vocals to the title track, "Rave On", on a 2011 tribute album to Buddy Holly, Rave On Buddy Holly. In 2016, Casablancas contributed three specially recorded the Velvet Underground covers – Venus in Furs, Run Run Run and White Light/White Heat, under the title White Light White Heat (rock n roll animal live era version) – to the HBO television series, Vinyl. The songs were subsequently released on various soundtracks to the series by Atlantic Records.

Casablancas worked with Daft Punk on their 2013 album Random Access Memories by contributing lyrics, vocals, and a guitar solo to their song "Instant Crush". The album won the 2013 Grammy Award for Album of the Year, with Casablancas as one of the co-recipients of the award. Another collaboration between Casablancas and Daft Punk written during the recording sessions of Random Access Memories was spoken about by Casablancas in several interviews following the album's release. This song "Infinity Repeating (2013 Demo)", also featuring the Voidz, would eventually release on the 10th anniversary edition of the album.

In April 2015, it was revealed that Casablancas had worked on a song with Savages' Jehnny Beth. The collaboration was later announced to be a cover of "Boy/Girl," a 1983 duet by Danish punk band Sort Sol and Lydia Lunch. The music video, directed by Warren Fu, was released on December 4, 2015. The 7" was released through both Cult Records and Pop Noire Records on December 18, 2015. Casablancas also wrote the song "Youth Without Love" for Har Mar Superstar's 2016 album Best Summer Ever, and is featured on "No One There", a song by Indian-born musician, Hammarsing Kharhmar (Exhibition).

In 2015, Julian also made an appearance on Leftöver Crack's album, Constructs of the State. His vocals can be heard on the song Vicious Constructs. The song is sung by both Casablancas and Leftöver Crack lead singer Stza Crack(Scott Sturgeon).

Casablancas also co-produced Rey Pila's 2015 album The Future Sugar and later their 2017 EP Wall of Goth.

On October 4, 2024, Charli XCX announced the collaborators for her remix album Brat and It's Completely Different but Also Still Brat, Julian being featured amongst them. On October 5, the track list was revealed and showed he would be featured on the remix of "Mean girls". In the buildup to the release of the album, she remarked that when it comes to his style, she thinks "he of all people understands how to capture that kind of an energy in a room and on the songs. It was definitely crazy pulling that all together." The album eventually released through Atlantic Records on October 11, 2024. The musical styling of the song ended up being closer to his recent work with the Voidz, having an electronic style reminiscent of his solo work.

== Musical influences and legacy ==
Casablancas cites the Doors as one of his earliest musical influences, though he specifies that he was influenced by their musical style rather than the public image of their vocalist and frontman Jim Morrison. He has also cited Lou Reed of the Velvet Underground as a major influence on his lyrics and singing style. He stated in a Rolling Stone interview, "The way Lou Reed wrote and sang about drugs and sex, about the people around him — it was so matter-of-fact. He could be romantic in the way he portrayed these crazy situations, but he was also intensely real. It was poetry and journalism." Additionally, he has stated that Bob Marley, Nirvana, and Pearl Jam are major influences on his work, even referring to the Pearl Jam song "Yellow Ledbetter" as the reason he started making music. He also, in agreement with several of his Voidz bandmates, named Stevie Wonder as a composer with a "next level mind".

Casablancas has served as inspiration for several other musicians including Alex Turner of the Arctic Monkeys and the painter Elizabeth Peyton. Courtney Love's song "But Julian, I'm a Little Bit Older Than You" from her debut solo album America's Sweetheart (2004) was written about Casablancas.

== Personal life ==
In 2005, Casablancas married Juliet Joslin, who was the assistant manager of the Strokes at the time. Their son, Cal, was born in January 2010. In the early 2010s, Casablancas and his family moved to Upstate New York from Greenwich Village in Manhattan and split their time between upstate New York and Long Beach, California. Their second son, Zephyr, was born on March 27, 2015. The couple divorced in 2019. By 2020, Casablancas had moved to Los Angeles, although in 2024 he confirmed he had since moved back to New York, having concluded that “[the] quality of life is higher in LA, and the quality of art is higher in New York, with respect to both."

Casablancas has been sober since 2009, stating that he was once "[hung over] for five years" during his drinking days.

Casablancas is a lifelong fan of the New York Mets, once even composing new theme music for SNY, who owns the Mets' local broadcasting rights, and offering it to the network for free. He has named Darryl Strawberry and Mike Piazza among his favorite players in franchise history. He has also expressed admiration for Buffalo Bills quarterback Josh Allen, going so far as to "quit [watching] sports" following the New York Jets' selection of Sam Darnold over Allen in the 2018 NFL draft.

== Politics ==
Although he has named the 2004 re-election of George W. Bush as what first motivated his interest in politics, it was only throughout the 2010s that Casablancas became increasingly vocal about his political concerns. He has expressed a belief that "whoever's propaganda's the loudest" determines popularity within politics and music alike. He is an ardent supporter of independent media and has also shown support for the Boycott Divestment and Sanctions (BDS) movement. Casablancas has cited Oliver Stone, Chris Hedges, Noam Chomsky, Jesse Ventura, and Howard Zinn as political influences, Martin Luther King Jr. as his favorite philosopher, and Paul Robeson as a role model for politically engaged musicians.

In 2016, Casablancas interviewed Henry Giroux for Rolling Stone. In 2019, he appeared in conversation with Giroux at McMaster University and authored the foreword to Giroux's The Terror of the Unforeseen.

In September 2018, Casablancas appeared on Lee Camp's show Redacted Tonight on RT America. The following month, Camp opened for the Voidz at a show in Houston, Texas.

Casablancas endorsed Vermont Senator Bernie Sanders for the 2020 Democratic Party presidential primaries, and on the eve of the 2020 New Hampshire primary, the Strokes performed in support of Sanders at the University of New Hampshire. That October, shortly before the 2020 United States elections, Rolling Stone released the first episode of Casablancas' interview series S.O.S. – Earth is a Mess, which premiered periodically through 2021. Guests included Amy Goodman, Andrew Yang, Richard D. Wolff, and Noam Chomsky, while much of Casablancas' questioning centered on democratic reform and the influence of special interest groups on politics and the media. Casablancas was one of more than 600 musicians who signed an open letter calling for a boycott of Israel.

Casablancas refused to vote in the 2024 US presidential election, saying "The two parties are a joke – a horrible lie" and that he "[saw] little point in choosing between these puppets...".

During a performance of "Oblivius" at the 2026 Coachella Music Festival, The Strokes displayed messages condemning foreign interference by the United States government, as well as Israeli violence in Gaza. Earlier in the performance, Casablancas criticized the United States’ involvement in the ongoing Iran war. Casablancas has also been critical of the company Amazon and its CEO Jeff Bezos, wearing a shirt with the word "crime" (a play on Amazon's service "prime") over Amazon's arrow label at the band's Coachella performance.

In an appearance in an April 2026 episode of the online series SubwayTakes with Kareem Rahma's long-form spinoff SubwayTakes Uncut, Casablancas criticized "American Zionists" for benefiting from "white privilege" and then "talk[ing] like they are Black people during slavery." Casablancas also compared the October 7 attacks to Native American uprisings and revolts during slavery as a response to a theoretical counter.

== Discography ==
Solo discography

- Phrazes for the Young (2009)

With the Voidz

- Tyranny (2014)
- Virtue (2018)
- Like All Before You (2024)

With the Strokes

- Is This It (2001)
- Room on Fire (2003)
- First Impressions of Earth (2005)
- Angles (2011)
- Comedown Machine (2013)
- The New Abnormal (2020)
- Reality Awaits (2026)
