= Alex Carapetis =

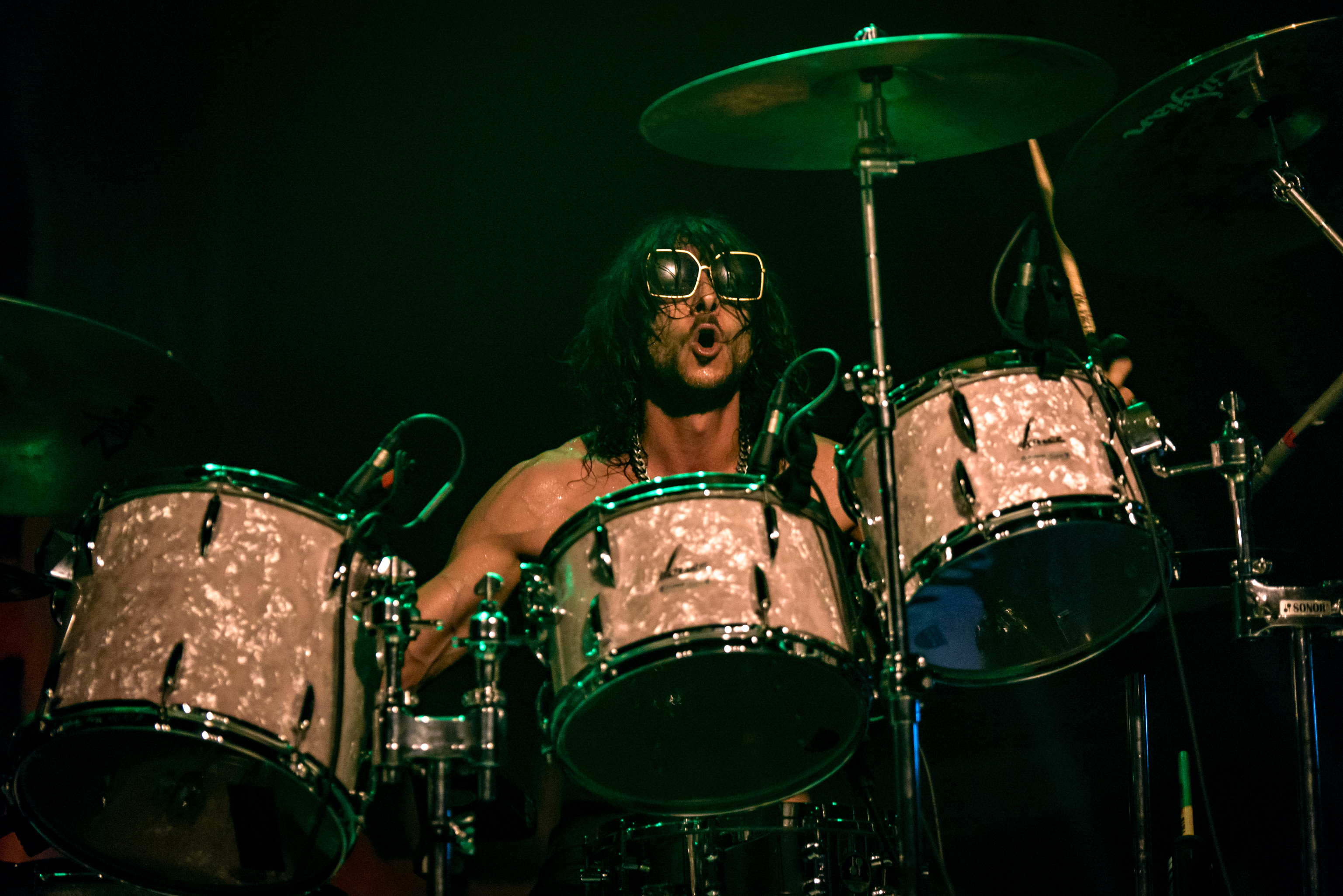
- Carapetis performing with Wolfmother in 2016

Background information
- Also known as: Young Pirate
- Born: Alex Carapetis; 27 April 1982 (age 43)
- Origin: Adelaide, Australia
- Genres: Rock
- Occupations: Drummer; Songwriter
- Instruments: Drums, bass guitar
- Years active: 2004 – present
- Label: Cult Records

Alex Carapetis (born 27 April 1982) is an Australian drummer and member of The Voidz. He was formerly a member of Wolfmother, and has toured with Nine Inch Nails, and Julian Casablancas among others. Alex currently resides in Los Angeles.

== Early life ==
Born in Adelaide, Australia, Alex studied jazz at the Elder Conservatorium in 2000 before moving to Sydney to further his music career. He finally relocated to the US in 2005 at the age of 23.

== Career ==
=== Touring ===
In October 2005, Trent Reznor hired Carapetis to be the touring drummer for Nine Inch Nails on their With Teeth World Tour, following the departure of long-time drummer Jerome Dillon, due to health issues. Carapetis was later replaced by Josh Freese, who had previously played with the band after Dillon's initial hospitalisation. In 2006, Alex toured as a drummer with Phoenix on their 'It's Never Been Like That' tour through the US and Europe and finished the year touring with Juliette and the Licks.

Year	Artist	Region
2002	Emmanuel Carella as support for Christina Aguilera	AUS
2002–2004	Jimmy Barnes	AUS, NZ, ASIA
2003	Jade MacRae	AUS
2004–2005	Delta Goodrem	AUS
2005	Amel Larrieux	US
2005	Nine Inch Nails	US, Canada, Brazil, Argentina
2005	Saul Williams	US
2006	Phoenix	US, Europe
2006	Juliette and the Licks	US, Europe
2007	J*Davey as support for Prince	US
2007	Elliott Yamin	US
2007	Admiral Freebee	US
2008	Mica Paris	Europe
2008	Kelis	Europe
2009	Perry Farrell	US, Live at Lollapalooza
2009	Julian Casablancas	World
2010	LP	US
2010	Kesha	Europe
2010–2011	Alex Boyd	US
2011	Beardo	US
2011–2012	Vicky Cryer	US
2012	Mr. Little Jeans	US
2013	The Dead Daisies	US, AUS
2014	Andy Rourke (of The Smiths)	US
2014	Julian Casablancas+The Voidz	World
2016	Wolfmother	US, Europe
2018	The Voidz	World

=== Studio Work ===
Alex has worked on various studio recordings with notable artists such as Sky Ferreira, Noah and the Whale, Passion Pit, Robbie Williams and Lenny Kravitz.

=== Julian Casablancas+The Voidz ===
After touring extensively with Julian Casablancas in 2009, Alex once again joined forces with The Strokes frontman on his new project, Julian Casablancas+The Voidz. The band, also composed of Jeramy "Beardo" Gritter (guitar), Amir Yaghmai (guitar), Jacob "Jake" Bercovici (bass guitar, synthesizers) and Jeff Kite (keys), began recording in 2013 in New York City in a DIY studio above Strand Book Store. They completed their first record, Tyranny, in 2014 and released it worldwide on September 23, 2014, to favorable reviews and press, including a covers of NME Magazine, Plugged and Alt-Citizen and TV appearances on Late Night with Jimmy Fallon and Le Grand Journal. Carapetis is credited as a songwriter on 'Human Sadness,' the second single off of Tyranny. The band toured extensively throughout late 2014, including stops in the US, South America and Europe. In 2015, the band continued to work on new music and tour, with appearances in Barcelona and Paris, among others.

=== Solo ===
In 2015, Alex began further work on an as-yet-to-be-titled solo project, performing under the name Young Pirate. He is currently working on his first solo EP which will feature original compositions and key guest vocalists and rappers.

== Endorsements ==
Carapetis is currently endorsed by US brands SUPRA shoes, KR3W Denim, Wildfox and SONOR Drums. He has previously worked with Vans and Diesel.
