= Arts & Crafts México =

Arts & Crafts Mexico
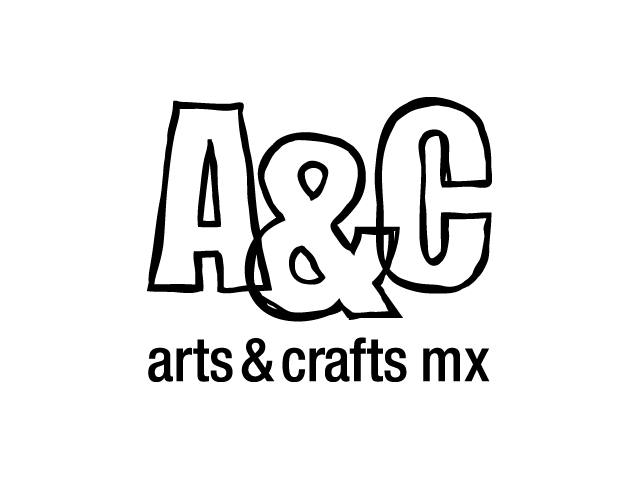
- Parent company: Arts & Crafts Productions
- Founded: 2008
- Founder: Jeffrey Remedios; Kevin Drew; Andrés Velasco; Armando David; Humberto Carmona
- Distributor: Universal Music Mexico
- Genre: Indie
- Country of origin: Mexico
- Location: Mexico City
- Official website: www.arts-crafts.com.mx

Arts & Crafts Mexico is an independent record label based in Mexico City. It is a branch of the Toronto-based company Arts & Crafts Productions. It started business in 2008, when Jeffrey Remedios and Kevin Drew decided to open an office abroad, in order to promote the independent music scene in Mexico. They produce records, as well as license material from other international labels.

== History ==
Jeffery Remedios and Kevin Drew founded the label in 2002. One goal was to create a family relationship between the artists and the label. They concentrate on creating an environment that is not only composed of high quality bands, but that is also familiar and welcoming. Arts & Crafts opened a satellite office in Mexico City in 2008.

Arts & Crafts México focuses on supporting national and international talent, as well as the local independent music community. During the past years, they have released records of local bands such as Rey Pila, Torreblanca, Los Odio!, Chikita Violenta, Bam Bam, I Can Chase Dragons! and Movus.

== Awards ==
=== Broken Social Scene ===
==== Polaris Music Prizes ====
| Year | Nominee / work | Award | Result |
|---|---|---|---|
| 2006 | Broken Social Scene | Polaris Music Prize | Nominated |
| 2010 | Forgiveness Rock Record | Polaris Music Prize | Nominated |

==== Juno Awards ====
| Year | Nominee / work | Award | Result |
|---|---|---|---|
| 2003 | Broken Social Scene You Forgot It in People | Alternative Album of the Year | Won |
| 2004 | Broken Social Scene "Stars and Sons" | Video of the Year | Nominated |

=== Stars ===
==== Polaris Music Prize ====
| Year | Nominee / work | Award | Result |
|---|---|---|---|
| 2008 | Stars In Our Bedroom After The War | Polaris Music Prize | Nominated |

=== Timber Timbre ===
==== Polaris Music Prize ====
| Year | Nominee / work | Award | Result |
|---|---|---|---|
| 2011 | Timber Timbre Creep on Creepin' On | Polaris Music Prize | Nominated |

=== The Stills ===
==== Juno Awards ====
| Year | Nominee / work | Award | Result |
|---|---|---|---|
| 2009 | The Stills Oceans Will Rise | Alternative Album of the Year | Won |
| 2009 | The Stills | New Group Of The Year | Won |

=== Bell Orchestre ===
==== Juno Awards ====
| Year | Nominee / work | Award | Result |
|---|---|---|---|
| 2010 | Bell Orchestre As Seen Through Windows | Instrumental Album Of The Year | Won |
