= The Voidz =

American rock band

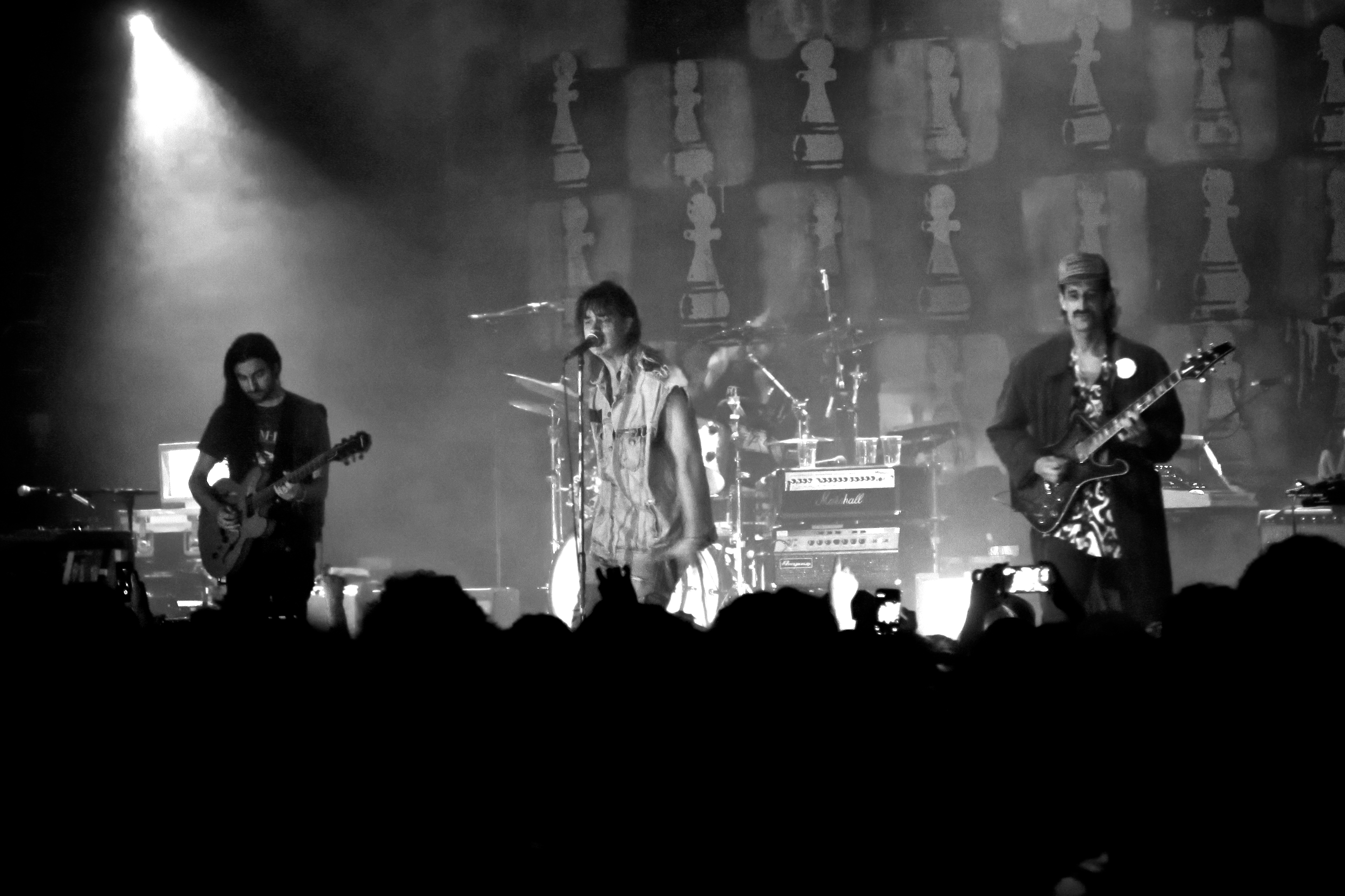
- The Voidz performing in 2014

Background information
- Also known as: Julian Casablancas + The Voidz (2013–2017)
- Genres: Experimental rock; new wave; neo-psychedelia; garage rock; electronica
- Years active: 2013–present
- Labels: Cult; RCA; Terrible
- Spinoff of: The Strokes
- Members: Julian Casablancas; Jeramy Gritter; Amir Yaghmai; Jacob Bercovici; Alex Carapetis; Jeff Kite
- Website: thevoidz.com

The Voidz (formerly Julian Casablancas + The Voidz) are an experimental rock band. They consist of Julian Casablancas (vocals), Jeramy "Beardo" Gritter (guitar), Amir Yaghmai (guitar), Jacob "Jake" Bercovici (bass, synthesizers), Alex Carapetis (drums), and Jeff Kite (keyboards).

Tyranny, their debut album, reached 50th in NME's Top 50 Albums of 2014 list.

== History ==
=== Formation, Tyranny (2013–2016) ===
Jeff Kite, Alex Carapetis and Jake Bercovici had all worked with Casablancas previously. Kite and Carapetis appeared as part of the Sick Six live band (which also featured Danielle Haim), that backed Casablancas when touring his first solo album, Phrazes for the Young. Kite and Carapetis, along with Bercovici, also worked on "I Like the Night", a song Casablancas recorded as part of an advertising campaign he fronted for the French fashion label, Azzaro.

Casablancas enjoyed working with the band and chose to collaborate with other musicians, in a similar format to the Sick Six, when recording his next album. Casablancas, Carapetis, Bercovici, and Kite, along with mutual friends Jeramy Gritter and Amir Yaghmai formed The Voidz and began writing music together.

Then known as Julian Casablancas + The Voidz, the band signed with Casablancas' record label Cult and, following an appearance at SXSW Festival, undertook an international tour between 2014 and 2015, including U.S. Lollapallooza and festivals in Chile, Brazil, and Argentina. The band's debut album, Tyranny, was released on September 23, 2014. The band's live sets generally consist of a mix between Casablancas' earlier solo songs, covers of Strokes songs written solely by Casablancas, collaborations with artists (such as Daft Punk's "Instant Crush" and Sparklehorse & Danger Mouse's "Little Girl") as well as their own original material from Tyranny, Virtue and Like All Before You.

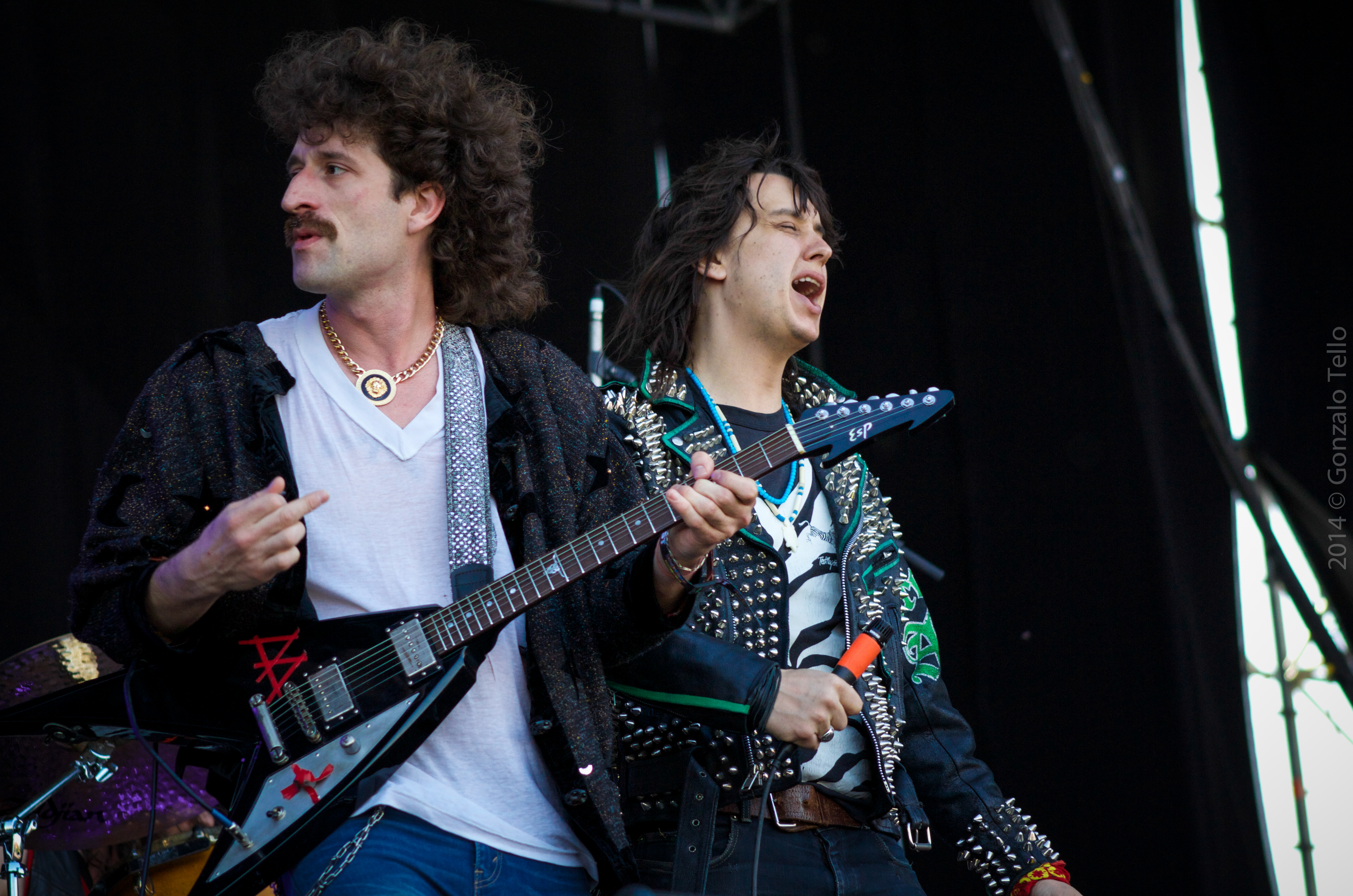
Julian Casablancas With The Voidz' Jeramy "Beardo" Gritter (formerly of Whitestarr) at Lollapalooza Chile, 2014

=== Virtue (2017–2019) ===
The band’s album Virtue was released in 2018, on Cult Records via RCA.

=== Singles and Like All Before You (2019–present) ===
In 2019, The Voidz collaborated with Mac DeMarco who produced two songs, “Did My Best” and “The Eternal Tao” later released as a single on Terrible Records. In December 2020, they released the single "Alien Crime Lord" to promote the Cayo Perico Heist update of Grand Theft Auto Online. In 2021, a reworked version of "The Eternal Tao" called "The Eternal Tao 2.0" was released, with an extended outro containing lyrics similar to the Strokes song "The Adults Are Talking".

On May 12, 2023, The Voidz featured in Daft Punk's song "Infinity Repeating (2013 Demo)," which was included in their 10th anniversary edition of Random Access Memories. Two weeks later, on May 26, they released the single "Prophecy of the Dragon." The following single "Flexorcist" was released in October that year. They released the single "All The Same" on February 21, 2024, which was previously a demo that they had performed live since 2020. In 2024, the band appeared in a special episode of filmmaker Rebekah Sherman-Myntti's music doc series TOMORROW!, featuring live performance footage and interviews filmed during the final night of The Voidz's residency at the Murmrr Theatre in November 2023.

On July 4, 2024, the Voidz revealed the title of their third album Like All Before You, to be released in September 2024. A trailer for the album was released on YouTube, alongside "Overture", an instrumental single from the album.

In the summer of 2024, a 4th album's tracklist was teased in a promotional photo for a collaboration between clothing brand Seekings, including song 'Russian Coney Island' which had previously been played live in 2020. The first track of the teased list, 'Blue Demon', was released as a single on March 2, 2025. The band later released the full EP titled Megz of Ram (MęĞż øF rÅm) on July 29, 2025.

== Band members ==
- Julian Casablancas – vocals, vocoder, sampler, guitar
- Jeramy "Beardo" Gritter – guitar, keyboards
- Amir Yaghmai – guitar, keyboards
- Jacob "Jake" Bercovici – bass, keyboards
- Alex Carapetis – drums, percussion, bass
- Jeff Kite – keyboards

== Discography ==
=== Studio albums ===
- Tyranny (2014)
- Virtue (2018)
- Like All Before You (2024)

=== EPs ===
- Męğż Øf Råm (2025)
