= Ray LaMontagne discography =

This is a listing of material released by Ray LaMontagne, a singer-songwriter from New Hampshire, United States. LaMontagne was working at a shoe factory in Lewiston, Maine, when he heard the song "Treetop Flyer" from Stephen Stills' Stills Alone album. The song inspired him to quit his job and become a musician. A ten-song demo from LaMontagne circulated amongst record executives, eventually prompting Chrysalis Music Publishing to help him record an album. LaMontagne's debut album, Trouble, was distributed by RCA Records and Echo Records. The album was a success; despite a low peak on the Billboard Hot 100. It has sold over 529,000 copies in the US to date. In the UK, however, the album reached the top 5 and the title track became a top 40 hit. LaMontagne has released eight other studio albums, 16 singles and 3 officially released extended plays after his debut.

== Discography ==
=== Studio albums ===
Title	Album details	Peak										Sales	Certifications
Title	Album details	US	AUS	BEL (Fl)	CAN	FRA	IRL	NL	NZ	SWI	UK	Sales	Certifications
Trouble	Release: September 14, 2004; Label: RCA; Format: CD, digital download, LP	189	—	—	—	164	4	—	—	—	5	US: 529,000	RIAA: Platinum; BPI: Platinum
Till the Sun Turns Black	Release: August 29, 2006; Label: RCA; Format: CD, digital download, LP	28	—	—	—	—	20	—	—	—	35	US: 296,000	BPI: Gold; RIAA: Gold
Gossip in the Grain	Release: October 14, 2008; Label: RCA; Format: CD, digital download, LP	3	73	25	13	107	14	48	32	—	23	US: 345,000	BPI: Silver; RIAA: Gold
God Willin' & the Creek Don't Rise	Release: August 17, 2010; Label: RCA; Format: CD, digital download, LP	3	41	34	4	69	13	16	24	43	17	US: 243,000	RIAA: Gold
Supernova	Release: April 29, 2014; Label: RCA; Format: CD, digital download, LP	3	49	46	4	139	8	24	—	—	18		
Ouroboros	Release: March 4, 2016; Label: RCA; Format: CD, digital download, LP	13	44	42	13	138	54	22	—	—	49		
Part of the Light	Release: May 18, 2018; Label: RCA; Format: CD, digital download, LP	40	—	52	44	—	40	60	—	40	28		
Monovision	Release: June 26, 2020; Label: RCA; Format: Digital download	163	—	—	—	—	—	—	—	—	—		
Long Way Home	Release: August 16, 2024; Label: Liula, Thirty Tigers; Format: Cd, Digital download, LP	—	—	—	—	—	—	—	—	—	—		
"—" denotes the album didn't chart.

== Extended plays ==
Title	EP details
Live from Bonnaroo 2005	Release: June 12, 2005; Label: RCA; Format: CD, digital download
Live – Fall 2010	Release: December 20, 2010; Label: RCA; Format: CD, digital download, LP
Live – Spring 2010	Release: February 15, 2011; Label: RCA; Format: CD, digital download, LP

== Singles ==
Year	Song	Peak chart positions						Certifications	Album
Year	Song	US	US Rock	US AAA	CAN	IRL	UK	Certifications	Album
2005	"Trouble"	—	—	5	—	44	25	RIAA: Platinum	Trouble
2006	"How Come"	—	—	—	—	—	110		Trouble
2006	"Forever My Friend"	—	—	—	—	—	—		Trouble
2007	"Jolene"	—	—	—	—	—	99	RIAA: Platinum	Trouble
2007	"Be Here Now"	—	—	—	—	—	—		Till the Sun Turns Black
2007	"Three More Days"	—	—	5	—	—	—		Till the Sun Turns Black
2008	"You Are the Best Thing"	90	—	5	89	47	169	RIAA: 2× Platinum	Gossip in the Grain
2008	"Meg White"	—	—	—	—	—	—		Gossip in the Grain
2008	"Let It Be Me"	—	—	—	—	—	—	RIAA: Platinum	Gossip in the Grain
2010	"Beg, Steal, or Borrow"	—	34	1	—	—	—		God Willin' and the Creek Don't Rise
2010	"For the Summer"	—	46	5	—	—	—		God Willin' and the Creek Don't Rise
2011	"Repo Man"	—	—	11	—	—	—		God Willin' and the Creek Don't Rise
2014	"Supernova"	—	42	3	—	—	—		Supernova
2014	"Drive-In Movies"	—	—	9	—	—	—		Supernova
2014	"She's the One"	—	—	—	—	—	—		Supernova
2016	"Hey, No Pressure"	—	— (Note: "Hey, No Pressure" did not enter the Billboard Hot Rock Songs chart, but peaked at number 49 on the Billboard Rock Airplay chart.)	2	—	—	—		Ouroboros
2016	"The Changing Man/While It Still Beats"	—	—	30	—	—	—		Ouroboros
2018	"Such a Simple Thing"	—	32	3	—	—	—	RIAA: Gold	Part of the Light
2020	"Strong Enough"	—	— (Note: "Strong Enough" did not enter the Billboard Hot Rock Songs chart, but peaked at number 32 on the Billboard Rock Airplay chart.)	1	—	—	—		Monovision
2020	"Roll Me Mama, Roll Me"	—	—	21	—	—	—		Monovision
2023	"It Takes Me Back"	—	—	—	—	—	—		Non-album single
2024	"Step Into Your Power"	—	—	1	—	—	—		Long Way Home
2024	"And They Called Her California"	—	—	31	—	—	—		Long Way Home

=== Other contributions ===
- Prime Soundtrack (2005, Varèse Sarabande) - "Shelter"
- Acoustic 05 (2005, Echo) - "Forever My Friend"
- A Lot Like Love Soundtrack (2005, Columbia Records) - "Trouble"
- The Last Kiss Soundtrack (2006, Lakeshore Records) - "Hold You In My Arms"
- The Devil Wears Prada Soundtrack (2006, Warner Bros./Wea) - "How Come"
- The Saturday Sessions: The Dermot O'Leary Show (2007, EMI) - "Trouble"
- The Fault in Our Stars Soundtrack (2014, Atlantic/Fox Music) - "Without Words"

=== Videography ===
- "Supernova" (2014)
