= List of awards and nominations received by Ray LaMontagne =

Ray LaMontagne awards and nominations
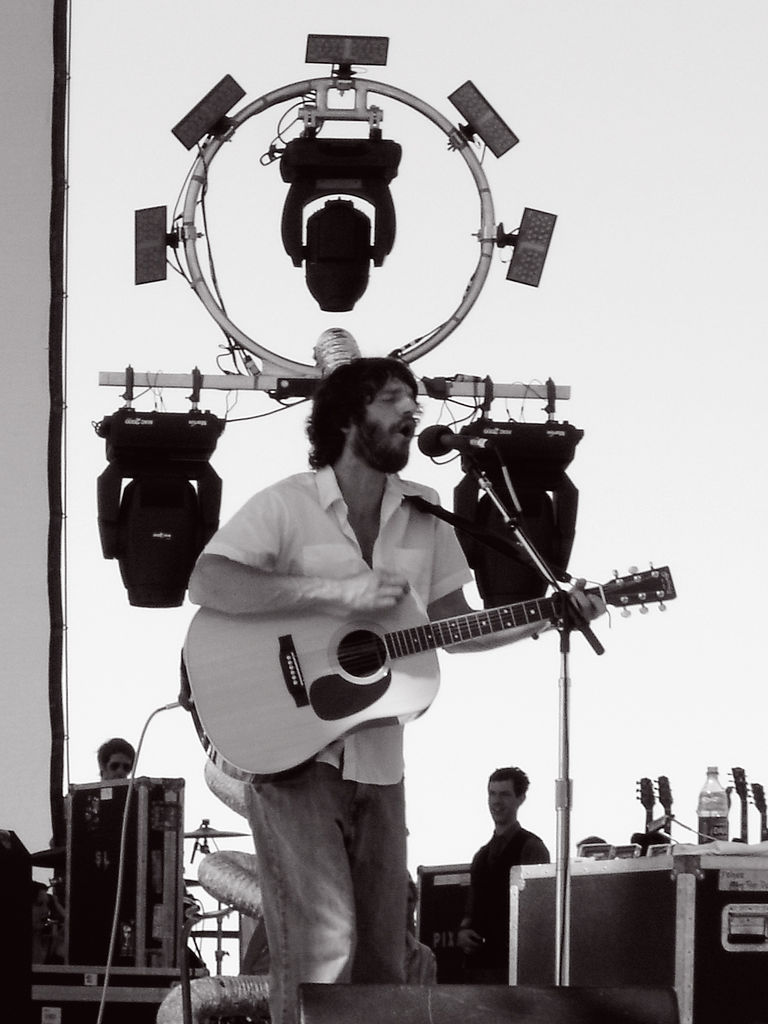
- LaMontagne in 2005 concert
Award	Wins	Nominations
Boston Music Awards	3	8
BRIT Awards	0	1
Esky Music Awards	1	1
Grammy Awards	1	2
MOJO Awards	0	1
New Pantheon Music Award	0	1
Pollstar Awards	0	1
XM Nation Awards	1	1
- Totals
Awards won	6
Nominations	16

Ray LaMontagne is an American singer-songwriter. He has released four studio albums: Trouble (2004), Till the Sun Turns Black (2006), Gossip in the Grain (2008), and God Willin' and the Creek Don't Rise (2010). LaMontagne's debut album was released through RCA Records in September 2004 in the United States and the United Kingdom, peaking at No. 189 on the Billboard 200 and No. 5 on the UK Albums Chart. Till the Sun Turns Black was released through RCA in August 2006 in the US and through 14th Floor Records in June 2007 in the UK. The album peaked at No. 35 in the UK, and reached a top position of No. 28 in the US. Gossip in the Grain was released through the same labels in October 2008, peaking at No. 3 on the Billboard 200 and No. 23 on the UK Albums Chart. LaMontagne has also released two EPs: Live from Bonnaroo 2005 was released through RCA in 2005 and Live Sessions was distributed via iTunes in 2009, reaching a peak position at No. 119 on the Billboard 200. Singles that have charted include "Trouble" (#25 on the UK Singles Chart) and "You Are the Best Thing" (#90 on the Billboard Hot 100 and No. 42 on the Hot Canadian Digital Singles chart).

For his debut album, LaMontagne won four awards, including three Boston Music Awards (Best Male Singer-Songwriter, Album of the Year, and Song of the Year) and an XM Nation Music Award for Acoustic Rock Artist of the Year. LaMontagne has received a nomination from the Pollstar Concert Industry Awards for Best New Touring Artist, the BRIT Awards for International Breakthrough Act, the MOJO Awards for Best New Act, and was given the title of Best Voice in 2006 by Esquire. Overall, LaMontagne has received 6 awards from 16 nominations.

== Boston Music Awards ==
The Boston Music Awards (formerly called the Kahlua Boston Music Awards) showcases talent and honors top musicians from a variety of genres in the greater Boston, Massachusetts area. LaMontagne has received three awards from eight nominations.

Year	Nominee / work	Award	Result
2005	Ray LaMontagne	Act of the Year	Nominated
2005	Ray LaMontagne	Male Vocalist of the Year	Nominated
2005	Ray LaMontagne	Best Male Singer-Songwriter	Won
2005	Trouble	Album of the Year	Won
2005	"Trouble"	Song of the Year	Won
2008	Ray LaMontagne	Act of the Year	Nominated
2008	Ray LaMontagne	Male Vocalist of the Year	Nominated
2008	Gossip in the Grain	Album of the Year	Nominated

== BRIT Awards ==
The BRIT Awards are the British Phonographic Industry's (BPI) annual pop music awards. LaMontagne has been nominated once.

Year	Nominee / work	Award	Result
2007	Ray LaMontagne	International Breakthrough Act	Nominated

== Esky Music Awards ==
The Esky Music Awards are awarded annually by Esquire, a men's magazine by the Hearst Corporation, to honor the best in music. LaMontagne has received one award from one nomination.

Year	Nominee / work	Award	Result
2006	Ray LaMontagne	Best Voice	Won

== Grammy Awards ==
The Grammy Awards are awarded annually by the National Academy of Recording Arts and Sciences of the United States. LaMontagne has received one award from two nominations.

Year	Nominee / work	Award	Result
2011	"Beg, Steal or Borrow"	Song of the Year	Nominated
2011	God Willin' and the Creek Don't Rise	Best Contemporary Folk Album	Won

== MOJO Awards ==
MOJO Awards are awarded by readers of the popular British music magazine, Mojo, published monthly by Bauer Media Group. LaMontagne has been nominated once.

Year	Nominee / work	Award	Result
2005	Ray LaMontagne	Best New Act	Nominated

== New Pantheon Music Prize ==
The New Pantheon Music Prize is a music award given annually to an album released in the United States. The Shortlist Music Prize was first given in 2001. In 2005, the Shortlist Prize was given under another name, the New Pantheon Prize. In September 2006, Shortlist co-founder Greg Spotts purchased complete ownership of the Shortlist and the New Pantheon, uniting the two prizes. A panel of music industry figures chooses the nominees and winners. Records are eligible if they are released between July two years previously and October of the previous year, and if they have not been certified gold (or sold 500,000 copies) by time of nomination. LaMontagne has been nominated once.

Year	Nominee / work	Award	Result
2005	Trouble	Shortlist Music Prize	Nominated

== Pollstar Concert Industry Awards ==
Established in 1984 and with ceremonies starting in 1990, the Pollstar Concert Industry Awards "honor artists, management, talent buyers, venues, support services and more for their professionalism, achievements and abilities." LaMontagne has been nominated once.

Year	Nominee / work	Award	Result
2005	Ray LaMontagne	Best New Touring Artist	Nominated

== XM Nation Music Awards ==
Awarded annually by XM Satellite Radio, the XM Nation Music Awards "honor some of the most talented and interesting musicians today". LaMontagne has received one award from one nomination.

Year	Nominee / work	Award	Result
2005	Ray LaMontagne	Acoustic Rock Artist of the Year	Won
