= Floating Action =

American band

Floating Action is a band from Black Mountain, North Carolina, founded by Seth Kauffman. Kauffman is the band's sole lyricist, songwriter, recorder and producer, in addition to playing almost all the music. Kauffman has been called "the underappreciated genius of the Asheville music scene", and has been compared to Harry Nilsson. Jim James of My Morning Jacket, Kauffman's frequent collaborator, called him "the most underrated person in music". He has also been praised by the Black Keys, Zach Miller of Dr. Dog, and Jonah Hill.

== History ==
Floating Action was formed by Kauffman after his previous musical project, the Motown sound group The Choosy Beggars, broke up in 2005. The project was named after an out-of-date Gretsch kick-drum pedal. Kauffman is also a member of the reggae- and dub-influenced duo Lord King, along with Evan Martin. Kauffman wrote and recorded an album with Michael Nau of Cotton Jones and Mighty Thread while quarantined under the project name Dream Sitch. He has also released a solo album called Ting.

Floating Action performed at South by Southwest in 2009 and at the Hangout Music Festival in 2017.

Kauffman is notable for his contributions to other musicians' albums. He played guitar on Lana Del Rey's Ultraviolence and Angel Olsen's My Woman, bass on Jim James' Uniform Distortion, and drums on Tyler Ramsey's The Valley Wind. James and Olsen appeared on Floating Action's 2016 album, Hold Your Fire. Other albums Kauffman has played on include three Ray LaMontagne releases (Supernova, Ouroboros, and Part of the Light) and Good Advice by Basia Bulat. He has produced music for Georgia Fair, Courtney Jaye, Lissie, and Daniel Martin Moore.

Floating Action has released 11 full-length albums. His most recent album, Outsider Art, received a digital release before its expected vinyl release due to the COVID-19 pandemic.

== Musical style ==
Floating Action's music blends multiple styles, including indie rock, folk, dub, and blues. Seth Kauffman has described Floating Action's sound as "lo-fi Carolina funk." Floating Action's music has been compared to the Beatles, the Black Keys, James Brown, Casiotone for the Painfully Alone, Ray Davies, Dr. Dog, the Flaming Lips, John Mayer, Menomena, My Morning Jacket, Okkervil River, Bill Withers, and the xx.

== Full-Length Releases ==
- Research (2008, Park the Van, as Seth Kauffman)
- Floating Action (2009, Park the Van)
- Desert Etiquette (2011, Park the Van)
- Fake Blood (2012, Removador)
- Body Action (2014, New West)
- Hold Your Fire (2016, PIAPTK)
- Is It Exquisite? (2017, PIAPTK)
- Heartache Essentials (2018, PIAPTK)
- Old World Camels (2019, PIAPTK)
- Outsider Art (2020, PIAPTK)
- Jinx Protecting (2022, PIAPTK)
