= List of Billboard number-one adult alternative singles of the 2020s =

Adult Alternative Songs, also known as Triple A, is a record chart that ranks the most-played songs on American adult album alternative radio stations. Currently published by the music industry magazine Billboard, the chart is formulated based on electronically monitored airplay data compiled by Nielsen Broadcast Data Systems. from a panel of 32 stations. It was introduced in January 1996 as a feature in Radio & Records magazine, which was later purchased by Billboard parent company Nielsen. Billboard appropriated the Radio & Records adult alternative chart in July 2008 and became its sole publisher after Radio & Records ceased publication in June 2009. The first number-one single of the 2020s on the Adult Alternative Songs chart was "Orphans" by British rock band Coldplay.

== Number-one singles ==
Key
† – Billboard year-end number-one single
↑ – Return of a single to number one

Single	Artist	Reached number one	Weeks at number one
"Orphans"	Coldplay	January 4, 2020	1
"Uneventful Days"	Beck	January 11, 2020	3
"Love You for a Long Time"	Maggie Rogers	February 1, 2020	1
"Orphans" ↑	Coldplay	February 8, 2020	1
"Colors"	Black Pumas	February 15, 2020	1
"And It's Still Alright"	Nathaniel Rateliff	February 22, 2020	8
"Black Madonna"	Cage the Elephant	April 18, 2020	2
"Bad Decisions"	The Strokes	May 2, 2020	4
"Lost in Yesterday"	Tame Impala	May 30, 2020	1
"Lay Your Head on Me"	Major Lazer featuring Marcus Mumford	June 6, 2020	4
"Hell N Back" †	Bakar	July 4, 2020	2
"Don't Let Me Down"	Milky Chance and Jack Johnson	July 18, 2020	1
"Strong Enough"	Ray LaMontagne	July 25, 2020	7
"I Got You"	Michael Franti and Spearhead	September 12, 2020	1
"Feel You"	My Morning Jacket	September 19, 2020	5
"Is It True"	Tame Impala	October 24, 2020	3
"Letter to You"	Bruce Springsteen	November 14, 2020	2
"Identical"	Phoenix	November 28, 2020	2
"Visitor"	Of Monsters and Men	December 12, 2020	1
"Officer of Love"	Caamp	December 19, 2020	6
"1st Time"	Bakar	January 30, 2021	3
"The Bandit" †	Kings Of Leon	February 20, 2021	6
"All My Favorite Songs"	Weezer	April 3, 2021	3
"Not Dead Yet"	Lord Huron	April 24, 2021	5
"Crawling Kingsnake"	The Black Keys	May 29, 2021	3
"We Are Between"	Modest Mouse	June 19, 2021	7
"Solar Power"	Lorde	August 7, 2021	2
"Last Train Home"	John Mayer	August 21, 2021	2
"Missing Piece"	Vance Joy	September 4, 2021	2
"Hush"	The Marías	September 18, 2021	1
"Survivor"	Nathaniel Rateliff and the Night Sweats	September 25, 2021	6
"I Don't Live Here Anymore"	The War on Drugs	November 6, 2021	1
"Brightside"	The Lumineers	November 13, 2021	2
"I Don't Live Here Anymore" ↑	The War on Drugs	November 27, 2021	6
"Crutch"	Band of Horses	January 8, 2022	2
"The Hardest Cut"	Spoon	January 22, 2022	3
"Wild Blue"	John Mayer	February 12, 2022	1
"Oh My God"	Adele	February 19, 2022	1
"Chapstick"	Coin	February 26, 2022	1
"U&Me"	Alt-J	March 5, 2022	1
"The Only Heartbreaker"	Mitski	March 12, 2022	1
"What, Me Worry?"	Portugal. The Man	March 19, 2022	3
"Virginia (Wind in the Night)"	The Head and the Heart	April 9, 2022	1
"Wild Child" †	The Black Keys	April 16, 2022	3
"My Love"	Florence and the Machine	May 7, 2022	2
"Wild Child" ↑†	The Black Keys	May 21, 2022	1
"My Love" ↑	Florence and the Machine	May 28, 2022	2
"Believe"	Caamp	June 11, 2022	2
"That's Where I Am"	Maggie Rogers	June 25, 2022	1
"Unconditional I (Lookout Kid)"	Arcade Fire	July 2, 2022	3
"One Step Ahead"	Jack Johnson	July 23, 2022	1
"Unconditional I (Lookout Kid)" ↑	Arcade Fire	July 30, 2022	1
"Alpha Zulu"	Phoenix	August 6, 2022	2
"Here to Forever"	Death Cab for Cutie	August 20, 2022	8
"Boy"	The Killers	October 15, 2022	1
"Snap"	Rosa Linn	October 22, 2022	7
"Tonight"	Phoenix featuring Ezra Koenig	December 10, 2022	7
"Run Away to Mars"	Talk	January 28, 2023	2
"Pages"	White Reaper	February 11, 2023	4
"Pepper"	Death Cab for Cutie	March 11, 2023	1
"Tropic Morning News"	The National	March 18, 2023	5
"Kid"	The Revivalists	April 22, 2023	4
"Eat Your Young"	Hozier	May 20, 2023	2
"Not Strong Enough" †	Boygenius	June 3, 2023	7
"Psychos"	Jenny Lewis	July 22, 2023	2
"Odyssey"	Beck and Phoenix	August 5, 2023	5
"Dial Drunk"	Noah Kahan	September 9, 2023	2
"Francesca"	Hozier	September 23, 2023	1
"More Than a Love Song"	Black Pumas	September 30, 2023	4
"Good Old Days"	The Revivalists	October 28, 2023	1
"More Than a Love Song" ↑	Black Pumas	November 4, 2023	1
"Good Old Days" ↑	The Revivalists	November 11, 2023	1
"Atomic City"	U2	November 18, 2023	1
"More Than a Love Song" ↑	Black Pumas	November 25, 2023	1
"Atomic City" ↑	U2	December 2, 2023	1
"Now and Then"	The Beatles	December 9, 2023	2
"What Now"	Brittany Howard	December 23, 2023	2
"Northern Attitude"	Noah Kahan and Hozier	January 6, 2024	1
"What Now" ↑	Brittany Howard	January 13, 2024	1
"Northern Attitude" ↑	Noah Kahan and Hozier	January 20, 2024	4
"Beautiful People (Stay High)"	The Black Keys	February 17, 2024	5
"Neon Pill"	Cage the Elephant	March 23, 2024	4
"Good People"	Mumford & Sons and Pharrell Williams	April 20, 2024	1
"Don't Forget Me"	Maggie Rogers	April 27, 2024	2
"Too Sweet" †	Hozier	May 11, 2024	10
"Heartless"	Nathaniel Rateliff & the Night Sweats	July 20, 2024	3
"Wreckage"	Pearl Jam	August 10, 2024	1
"Step Into Your Power"	Ray LaMontagne	August 17, 2024	3
"Rainbow"	Cage the Elephant	September 7, 2024	3
"Floating Parade"	Michael Kiwanuka	September 28, 2024	2
"Up All Night"	James Bay with The Lumineers and Noah Kahan	October 12, 2024	1
"Peaceful Place"	Leon Bridges	October 19, 2024	2
"Nobody's Soldier"	Hozier	November 2, 2024	5
"Call Me (Whatever You Like)"	Nathaniel Rateliff & the Night Sweats	December 7, 2024	2
"Arrow" †	The Head and the Heart	December 21, 2024	9
"Same Old Song"	The Lumineers	February 22, 2025	7
"The Night Before"	The Black Keys	April 12, 2025	3
"Time Waited"	My Morning Jacket	May 3, 2025	1
"Let Things Go"	Caamp	May 10, 2025	3
"Nothing I Need"	Lord Huron	May 31, 2025	6
"Moody"	Royel Otis	July 12, 2025	6
"Everyday Magic"	My Morning Jacket	August 23, 2025	3
"Sally, When the Wine Runs Out"	Role Model	September 13, 2025	1
"Mistakes"	Caamp	September 20, 2025	4
"Sushi and Coca Cola"	St. Paul and The Broken Bones	October 18, 2025	1
"Another Life"	Alabama Shakes	October 25, 2025	4
"Ordinary Creature"	Of Monsters and Men	November 22, 2025	1
"Rubber Band Man"	Mumford & Sons and Hozier	November 29, 2025	1
"Tanana"	Portugal. The Man	December 6, 2025	1
"Rubber Band Man" ↑	Mumford & Sons and Hozier	December 13, 2025	9
"To Space"	Kings of Leon	February 14, 2026	2
"The Great Divide"	Noah Kahan	February 28, 2026	11
"Riptides"	Death Cab for Cutie	May 16, 2026	5
"Going Shopping"	The Strokes	June 20, 2026	2
"Here"	Mumford & Sons and Chris Stapleton	July 4, 2026	2
"Doors"	Noah Kahan	July 18, 2026	4
"Heart Stop"	The Revivalists	August 15, 2026	2
"Lost Boys"	Phoebe Bridgers	August 29, 2026	3
"Beaches in Tennessee"	Cage the Elephant	September 19, 2026	5
"Stone Over Water"	Death Cab for Cutie	October 24, 2026	2
"Marianne"	Fontaines D.C.	November 7, 2026	2
"Talk It Over"	Leon Bridges	November 21, 2026	1
