= You Are the Best Thing =

- Cover of the promo single

Single by Ray LaMontagne

from the album Gossip in the Grain
- Released: August 26, 2008
- Recorded: 2008
- Length: 3:51
- Label: Stone Dwarf Music, LLC; RCA; Jive
- Songwriters: Ray LaMontagne, Danny Holland
- Producer: Ethan Johns

Ray LaMontagne singles chronology
"Three More Days" (2007)	"You Are the Best Thing" (2008)	"Meg White" (2008)

"You Are the Best Thing" is the lead single of the album Gossip in the Grain by American folk singer-songwriter Ray LaMontagne released on August 26, 2008, by Stone Dwarf Music, LLC, under license to RCA/JIVE Label Group, a unit of Sony Music Entertainment.

The song hit number five on Billboard's Adult Alternative Songs chart, and is currently his only single to chart on the Billboard Hot 100, reaching number 90.

== In popular culture ==
"You Are the Best Thing" was featured in the film I Love You, Man, and in an episode of the Australian TV show Packed to the Rafters. It was also featured in the film Bad Moms, released in 2016.

Singer Jovin Webb sang the song on American Idol season 18 during the Showcase Round at Aulani Resort in Kapolei, Hawaii which aired on March 29, 2020.

The song plays over the credits of Hacks season 5, episode 5, which aired on April 30, 2026.

Reference to the first song on a LaMontagne album can be found at the end of in chapter 15 in Tessa Bailey’s Hook, Line, and Sinker (2022).

== Charts ==
Chart (2008–09)	Peak position
Canada Hot 100 (Billboard)	89
Ireland (IRMA)	47
UK Singles (Official Charts Company)	169
US Adult Alternative Airplay (Billboard)	5
US Billboard Hot 100	90

== Certifications ==
Region	Certification	Certified units/sales
New Zealand (RMNZ)	Platinum	30,000^{‡}
United States (RIAA)	2× Platinum	2,000,000^{‡}
^{‡} Sales+streaming figures based on certification alone.
