= Live from Bonnaroo 2005 (EP) =

EP by Ray LaMontagne
- Released: December 2005
- Recorded: 2005
- Genre: Folk, singer-songwriter
- Label: RCA Records

Live from Bonnaroo 2005 is a live EP by Ray LaMontagne, released in December 2005. It contains five live versions of tracks from Lamontagne's debut album, Trouble, and one previously unreleased track. The EP is based on a small set that the singer played at the Bonnaroo Music Festival.

== Track listing ==
1. "Burn"
2. "Trouble"
3. "Shelter"
4. "Empty" (previously unreleased)
5. "Jolene"
6. "Forever My Friend"

== Personnel ==
- Larry Ciancia – drums
- Ray LaMontagne – acoustic guitar, lead vocals
- Chris Thomas – upright bass
