= Reality Awaits =

Studio album by the Strokes
- Released: July 24, 2026
- Studios: Villa Nimbú (Guanacaste, Costa Rica); Shangri-La (Malibu); The Mansion (Los Angeles)
- Genre: Art rock
- Length: 42:39
- Labels: RCA; Cult
- Producer: Rick Rubin

The Strokes chronology
The New Abnormal (2020)	Reality Awaits (2026)

Singles from Reality Awaits
- 1. "Going Shopping" Released: April 7, 2026; 2. "Falling Out of Love" Released: May 13, 2026

Reality Awaits is the seventh studio album by the American rock band the Strokes, released on July 24, 2026, on RCA and Cult Records. Produced by Rick Rubin, who had worked with the band on their previous album, The New Abnormal (2020), the album was preceded by the singles "Going Shopping" and "Falling Out of Love".

Recording for the album began in 2022, with the band and Rubin working in the province of Guanacaste in Costa Rica. Further recording sessions took place at Rubin's California-based studios, Shangri-La and The Mansion.

Released to mostly positive reviews, the album reached number thirteen on the Billboard 200, number eight on the UK Albums Chart and charted highly in several countries. For the album's accompanying tour, guitarist Nick Valensi took a leave of absence from the band and was replaced by Steve Schiltz of the band Longwave.

== Background and recording ==
After working with producer Rick Rubin on their sixth studio album, The New Abnormal (2020), the band began recording with him again two years later in Guanacaste, Costa Rica. Rubin confirmed his involvement in a 2022 interview, stating: "It's like [the Strokes are] doing a concert for the ocean, on the top of a mountain […] And we did that every day, playing out in the [open], and they didn’t want to leave. It was, like, the best experience."

Guitarist Albert Hammond Jr. elaborated, noting: "It was really cool to go back to the studio with [Rubin] after The New Abnormal. There’s no like hidden agenda or secret – we were recording in Costa Rica. [...] There is stuff that we’re working on that we are excited about. We are continually working, and that brings us joy. In my own words: we got to record in the most fantastical environment I have ever been able to record in. It was very exciting for me, and for all of us." Hammond Jr. went on to describe the sessions as: "a little looser in a sense of our style."

Prior to the album's release, Hammond Jr. noted: "It’s my favourite album we’ve ever done. I can’t express how beautiful it is. I listen to the whole thing and wanna start from the beginning again. It grows and grows and becomes intoxicatingly good."

== Packaging ==
The cover art for Reality Awaits, created by Johann Rashid, is based on the 1989 photograph Untitled (Cowboy) by Richard Prince.

== Release and marketing ==
On April 6, 2026, the Strokes announced Reality Awaits via Instagram, with a teaser video displaying a 1980s Nissan 300ZX with text reading "In the flesh, it's even sexier", followed by the album's title and release date announced for June 26. On the same day, the band distributed cassette tapes containing the new song "Going Shopping" to 100 fans who had provided their mailing address to their promotional SMS service the previous week. They also debuted the song live at the Bill Graham Civic Auditorium. The following day, they revealed the album's cover art and released the track onto streaming platforms as the album's lead single. On May 13, the band released the second single "Falling Out of Love" on streaming platforms. On June 11, the band announced that the release date had been delayed to July 24.

Concurrently with the album, the band released In Transit: Part II, a 10-minute documentary directed by Johann Rashid following the recording of Reality Awaits with Rick Rubin in Costa Rica. The title is a reference to the short film In Transit, which documented the band 25 years prior, during its 2001 European tour in support of The Modern Age EP.

On November 8, the band released a music video for the track "Lonely in the Future". Directed by Warren Fu, the video features handcrafted caricature puppets created by the team behind the British television show Spitting Image. The visual presents a series of vignettes addressing corporate power and media manipulation. Puppets of prominent billionaires and media executives, such as Elon Musk, Jeff Bezos, Mark Zuckerberg and Rupert Murdoch are depicted in newsrooms manipulating global events. Other vignettes involve activists Chris Smalls and Greta Thunberg, journalists Lee Camp and Chris Hedges, and artists Lou Reed, Johann Sebastian Bach, and Stanley Kubrick. A segment involving a puppet of music critic Anthony Fantano criticizing Bach's arrangement "Aria Suite No. 3" with the lyrics "Fantano, word for word when I was a kid / Stick to the technical, 'cause that's great / But you would not recognize art in any age" gained notoriety online.

== Critical reception ==
Professional ratings
Aggregate scores
Source	Rating
Any Decent Music	6.5/10
Metacritic	70/100
Review scores
Source	Rating
AllMusic	3.5/5 stars
The Arts Desk	2/5 stars
Clash	7/10
Consequence	B+
The Guardian	4/5 stars
NME	4/5 stars
Paste	B
Pitchfork	6.5/10
Rolling Stone	3/5 stars
Slant	2.5/5 stars

Any Decent Music gave the album a weighted average score of 6.5 out of 10 from twenty-one critic scores. According to Metacritic, it received "generally favorable" reviews based on a weighted average score of 70 out of 100 from seventeen critic scores.

Rolling Stone writer Jon Dolan, gave a weighted score of 3/5 stars. In the article, he wrote, "The veteran band’s latest album is an at times thrilling, often inscrutable, sometimes straight-up bizarre addition to their story." John Wohlmacher of Beats Per Minute described the album as a "bold art-rock statement" and said that it was "potentially even the most consciously artistic recording of their career".

== Commercial performance ==
According to data reported by Hits, the album earned 29,991 album-equivalent units in its first week in the United States, comprising 17,934 album sales, 11,983 streaming-equivalent albums, and 74 track-equivalent albums.

== Track listing ==
Reality Awaits track listing
No.	Title	Length
1.	"Psycho Shit"	5:23
2.	"Dine N'Dash"	5:03
3.	"Lonely in the Future"	3:20
4.	"Falling Out of Love"	6:21
5.	"Going to Babble On"	4:06
6.	"Going Shopping"	4:18
7.	"Liar's Remorse"	4:50
8.	"The Fruits of Conquest"	5:08
9.	"Tyrants of the Mellow Moon"	4:10
Total length:		42:39

== Personnel ==
Personnel taken from the album's liner notes.

=== The Strokes ===
- Julian Casablancas – vocals, keyboards (Note: Although he is not directly credited in the album liner notes, he can be seen recording keyboard parts in the documentary "In Transit: Part II".)
- Albert Hammond Jr. – guitars
- Nick Valensi – guitars, keyboards (Note: Although he is not directly credited in the album liner notes, he can be seen recording keyboard parts in the photos on the gatefold sleeve.)
- Nikolai Fraiture – bass guitar
- Fabrizio Moretti – drums

=== Technical personnel ===
- Rick Rubin – production
- Jason Lader – recording and mixing
- Stephen Marcussen – mastering
- Ray Aldaco – additional engineering
- Gus Oberg – additional engineering
- Ethan Schneiderman – additional engineering
- Dylan Neustadter – additional engineering
- Fresco Beccafichi – additional engineering
- Bobby Mota – assistant engineering
- Tyler Beans – assistant engineering
- Jonathan Pfarr – assistant engineering
- Liam Keim – assistant engineering
- Sam Roberts – assistant engineering
- Sofia Staedler – assistant engineering
- Jack Ross – assistant engineering
- Michael Fierro – production assistance
- Andre Harsvik – production assistance
- Dutch Lennon – production assistance
- Coleman Reichenbach – production assistance
- Ryan Rapp – studio backline technician
- Richard Prince – cover artwork (Untitled (Cowboy), 1989)
- Johann Rashid – art direction, design, and photography
- Sarah Schmitt – design

== Charts ==
Chart performance for Reality Awaits
Chart (2026)	Peak position
Australian Albums (ARIA)	10
Austrian Albums (Ö3 Austria)	8
Belgian Albums (Ultratop Flanders)	12
Belgian Albums (Ultratop Wallonia)	3
Canadian Albums (Billboard)	60
Croatian International Albums (HDU)	23
Dutch Albums (Album Top 100)	18
Finnish Physical Albums (Suomen virallinen lista)	8
French Albums (SNEP)	12
French Rock & Metal Albums (SNEP)	2
German Albums (Offizielle Top 100)	11
German Rock & Metal Albums (Offizielle Top 100)	4
Irish Albums (Official Charts)	10
Italian Albums (FIMI)	13
Japanese Albums (Oricon)	23
Japanese Download Albums (Billboard Japan)	8
Japanese Rock Albums (Oricon)	1
Japanese Top Albums Sales (Billboard Japan)	22
Lithuanian Albums (AGATA)	79
New Zealand Albums (RMNZ)	11
Norwegian Albums (IFPI Norge)	65
Portuguese Albums (AFP)	6
Scottish Albums (Official Charts)	4
Spanish Albums (Promusicae)	11
Swedish Albums (Sverigetopplistan)	32
Swiss Albums (Schweizer Hitparade)	7
UK Albums (Official Charts)	8
US Billboard 200	13
US Top Rock & Alternative Albums (Billboard)	5
