= Going Shopping (song) =

Single by The Strokes

from the album Reality Awaits
- Released: April 7, 2026
- Genre: Indie rock
- Length: 4:23
- Label: RCA; Cult
- Producer: Rick Rubin

The Strokes singles chronology
"The Adults Are Talking" (2020)	"Going Shopping" (2026)	"Falling Out of Love" (2026)

Music video
- "Going Shopping" on YouTube

"Going Shopping" is a 2026 single by the American indie rock band, the Strokes, and the lead single off their seventh studio album, Reality Awaits. The single was released on April 7, 2026.

It spent two weeks at number-one on the Billboard Adult Alternative Airplay chart.

== Composition and lyrics ==
"Going Shopping" has been described an indie rock song with elements of art punk, surf rock and synth-pop. The song has been described by music critics as a song that reminsicent of lead singer Julian Casablancas' work with The Voidz, as well as past Strokes songs on Angles and The New Abnormal.

The song is played in standard guitar tuning, composed in the E major key, utilizing the E Mixolydian mode. "Going Shopping" is written and composed in a standard 4/4 time signature. Both guitarist Albert Hammond Jr. and Nick Valensi utilize standard guitar tuning for the track. The arrangement features the band's signature interlocking guitar parts, pairing clean rhythmic downstrokes with melodic, syncopated lead lines.

Lyrically, "Going Shopping" is a satirical track critiquing both modern consumerism, capitalism, and digital overstimulation. The core of the song, about "shopping", frames the act of retail therapy as an act of self-soothing and escape from the anxieties of reality.

== Release ==
The song was released to radio airplay, streaming services, and digital download on April 7, 2026. The day before the release, on April 6, 2026, the band played "Going Shopping" in its current form a show at the Bill Graham Civic Auditorium in San Francisco, California in between weekends of the 2026 Coachella Music and Arts Festival. Additionally, the first 100 fans who responded to the band's marketing texts received a physical cassette single of the song. The following week, the single made its radio debut on KROQ's Locals Only evening program for new and emerging songs.

=== Music video ===
On June 28, 2026, the band released a music video for "Going Shopping" directed by Johann Rashid. The video features Walton Goggins and references the video for Paul Simon's 1986 song "You Can Call Me Al" featuring Chevy Chase.

== Critical reception ==
Writing for Louder Than War, Martin Gray concluded that "the vocal gimmickry on this new single of theirs is a bit of an acquired taste and requires some perseverance", but ultimately gave positive feedback on the track, comparing the autotune use heavily to bands like The High Llamas and Casablancas' side project, The Voidz.

== Personnel ==
Personnel taken from Reality Awaits' liner notes.

The Strokes

- Julian Casablancas – vocals
- Albert Hammond Jr. – guitars
- Nick Valensi – guitars, keyboards (Note: Although he is not directly credited in the album liner notes, he can be seen recording keyboard parts in the photos on the gatefold sleeve.)
- Nikolai Fraiture – bass guitar
- Fabrizio Moretti – drums

Technical personnel

- Rick Rubin – production
- Jason Lader – recording and mixing
- Stephen Marcussen – mastering

== Charts ==
"Going Shopping" received heavy airplay on Triple-A, alternative rock, active rock, and independent radio stations. The song became the band's second single of the 2020s to reach number-one on the Billboard Adult Alternative Airplay chart (after "Bad Decisions" topped the chart in 2020). The song held the pole position in the chart for two weeks beginning June 20, 2026.

=== Weekly charts ===
Chart (2026)	Peak position
Colombia Anglo Airplay (Monitor Latino)	13
Japan Hot Overseas (Billboard)	10
New Zealand (Recorded Music NZ)	40
US Adult Alternative Airplay (Billboard)	1
US Hot Rock & Alternative Songs (Billboard)	30
US Rock & Alternative Airplay (Billboard)	6
