= Falling Out of Love =

Single by the Strokes

from the album Reality Awaits
- Released: May 13, 2026
- Length: 6:21
- Label: RCA
- Producer: Rick Rubin

The Strokes singles chronology
"Going Shopping" (2026)	"Falling Out of Love" (2026)

"Falling Out of Love" is a song by the American rock band the Strokes, released as the second single from their seventh studio album Reality Awaits (2026) on May 13, 2026 by RCA Records.

== Release and reception ==
DIY magazine's writers wrote that is a "vocoder-laden offering, but this time Julian Casablancas and co. have traded peppy percussion and propulsive guitar lines for something altogether more balladic, drawing on gentle progressions and swelling atmospherics to evoke an uncanny sense of emotional stakes." NME writer Liberty Dunworth wrote that it "sees the band lean into gentle, swirling guitar riffs and heartfelt vocals.", noting the band's use of vocoders on it are reminiscent of Daft Punk's music specifically highlighting their song "Instant Crush" from Random Access Memories and also likening it to their more recent music, highlighting "At the Door" from The New Abnormal. Bill Pearis of BrooklynVegan calls it a "dreamy ballad made more surreal with the heavy autotune on Julian Casablancas' vocals." Tom Breihan of Stereogum wrote that the band "finds a loping midtempo groove, and Julian Casablancas lets loose with the vocal theatrics. But he sings through so many digital filters that his voice occasionally ceases to sound recognizably human", adding that "The song goes on for a long time, over six minutes, and the effects just get harder and harder to ignore. I think this is a pretty funny bit. You may well disagree."

== Personnel ==
Personnel taken from Reality Awaits' liner notes.

- Julian Casablancas – vocals
- Albert Hammond Jr. – guitar
- Nick Valensi – guitar, keyboards (Note: Although he is not directly credited in the album liner notes, he can be seen recording keyboard parts in the photos on the gatefold sleeve.)
- Nikolai Fraiture – bass
- Fabrizio Moretti – drums

== Charts ==
Chart (2026)	Peak position
New Zealand (Recorded Music NZ)	40
