= Long Way Home (Ray LaMontagne album) =

Studio album by Ray LaMontagne
- Released: August 16, 2024
- Length: 31:32
- Labels: Liula; Thirty Tigers
- Producers: Ray LaMontagne; Seth Kauffman

Ray LaMontagne chronology
Monovision (2020)	Long Way Home (2024)

Long Way Home is the ninth studio album by American singer-songwriter Ray LaMontagne. It was released on August 16, 2024, by LaMontagne's own record label Liula Records with distribution by Thirty Tigers. The album was co-produced by LaMontagne and Seth Kauffman.

== Background ==
Long Way Home was announced on May 30, 2024, alongside its release date of August 16, 2024. The album is LaMontagne's first to be released independently after his previous albums were released by RCA Records in the United States.

== Promotion ==
The album was preceded by the release of three singles. The lead single, "Step Into Your Power", was released on June 5, 2024. It topped Billboard's Adult Alternative Airplay chart in August 2024, becoming LaMontagne's third single to top the chart. The album's title track was released as the second single on June 28, 2024. The third and final single, "I Wouldn't Change a Thing", was released on July 26, 2024.

== Critical reception ==
No Depression wrote in their review of Long Way Home: "When Ray LaMontagne debuted two decades ago, his weathered tenor sounded otherworldly. Its power seemed unlikely from such a shy, subdued performer. Now entrenched in middle age, the New England singer-songwriter’s instrument is no less sonorous or wondrous. He has just grown into it. LaMontagne sounds more comfortable, and contented, than ever on his ninth studio album, Long Way Home." When The Horn Blows deemed the album LaMontagne's "most reflective, and honest work to date." RIFF Magazine praised the album for its versatility, highlighting tracks such as "Yearning", which it said recalls Bob Dylan's albums Nashville Skyline and Blood on the Tracks, and "And They Called Her California" and "The Way Things Are", which it compared to the works of Joni Mitchell.

== Track listing ==
All tracks are written by Ray LaMontagne.

Long Way Home track listing
No.	Title	Length
1.	"Step Into Your Power"	3:28
2.	"I Wouldn't Change a Thing"	3:51
3.	"Yearning"	4:03
4.	"And They Called Her California"	3:57
5.	"La De Dum, La De Da"	2:43
6.	"My Lady Fair"	3:40
7.	"The Way Things Are"	4:03
8.	"So, Damned, Blue" (Instrumental)	1:46
9.	"Long Way Home"	4:01
Total length:		31:32

== Personnel ==
- Ray LaMontagne – acoustic guitars, production, engineering, mixing (all tracks); vocals (tracks 1–7, 9); harmony vocals (1–4); bass (2–4, 6, 7); percussion (2); organ (3, 5, 6); drums, harmonica (4); mbira (7)
- Seth Kauffman – production, engineering, mixing (all tracks); drums (1); Mellotron (tracks 1, 3, 6); electric guitar (1, 4); bass, percussion (1, 5, 8, 9); conga (3); strings (3, 6, 9); backing vocals (4); textures (5, 6, 8); tambourine (6)
- Ariel Bernstein – engineering, mixing (all tracks); drums (tracks 1–3, 6)
- Laura Rogers – backing vocals (tracks 1–3)
- Lydia Slagle – backing vocals (tracks 1–3)
- Carl Broemel – pedal steel (track 2)
- Michael Nau – backing vocals (track 4)
- Jacob Rodriguez – horns (track 6)
- Brian Lee – mastering
- Bob Jackson – mastering
- Barbara S. Beck – cover illustration
- Meghan Foley – art direction & design
