= Beg, Steal or Borrow (Ray LaMontagne song) =

Single by Ray LaMontagne & the Pariah Dogs

from the album God Willin' and the Creek Don't Rise
- Released: July 2, 2010
- Recorded: 2010
- Genre: Folk rock
- Length: 4:32
- Label: RCA
- Songwriter(s): Ray LaMontagne
- Producer(s): Ray LaMontagne

Ray LaMontagne & the Pariah Dogs singles chronology
"You Are the Best Thing" (2008)	"Beg, Steal or Borrow" (2010)

"Beg, Steal or Borrow" is the lead single of the album God Willin' and the Creek Don't Rise by American folk singer-songwriter Ray LaMontagne and his backing band The Pariah Dogs released on July 2, 2010.

The song received a Grammy Award nomination for Song of the Year on December 1, 2010.

== Critical reception ==
"Beg, Steal or Borrow" has received positive reviews from music critics. The song received a "thumbs up" review from the American Noise website. Merchants of Rock described it as "very promising" written in the same vein of his then-latest single "You Are the Best Thing".

== Chart performance ==
The song debuted on the Billboard Rock Songs chart at number 42 on September 11, 2010. The following week it reached its peak position at number 34, remaining in the chart for the following 14 weeks. On January 8, 2011, the single re-entered the Rock Songs chart at number 50.
