= Trouble (Ray LaMontagne song) =

- Cover of "Trouble" (New Radio Mix)

Single by Ray LaMontagne

from the album Trouble
- Released: 2005
- Length: 4:03
- Label: RCA Records
- Songwriter: Ray LaMontagne
- Producer: Ethan Johns

Ray LaMontagne singles chronology
"Trouble" (2005)	"How Come" (2007)

Music video
- "Trouble" on YouTube

"Trouble" is the first track on the debut album of the same name by American folk singer Ray LaMontagne. The album was released by RCA on September 14, 2004. The single also appeared on LaMontagne's Live from Bonnaroo EP, released in 2005, as well as the 2007 compilation album, The Saturday Sessions: The Dermot O'Leary Show.

The single charted at number 25 on the UK Singles Chart in March 2005, staying on the chart for a ten-week run.

== In popular media ==
This song appeared in a Travelers Insurance campaign featuring a dog concerned over the security of his bone. It was also in "Out of Time", an episode of Torchwood, an episode of "The Office", an episode of Rescue Me, an episode of "Alias", the film A Lot like Love, and the finale of the first season of True Blood.

== Certifications ==
Region	Certification	Certified units/sales
United States (RIAA)	Platinum	1,000,000^{‡}
^{‡} Sales+streaming figures based on certification alone.
