= Monovision (album) =

MONOVISION

Studio album by Ray LaMontagne
- Released: June 26, 2020
- Studio: The Big Room
- Genre: Folk rock
- Length: 45:04
- Label: RCA
- Producer: Ray LaMontagne

Ray LaMontagne chronology
Part of the Light (2018)	MONOVISION (2020)	Long Way Home (2024)

Monovision (stylized MONOVISION) is the eighth studio album by Ray LaMontagne, released on June 26, 2020, via RCA Records. "Strong Enough" was released as the lead single.

== Reception ==
Professional ratings
Aggregate scores
Source	Rating
Metacritic	80/100
Review scores
Source	Rating
AllMusic	4/5 stars
American Songwriter	4/5 stars
Exclaim!	7/10

The album received generally favorable reviews from critics. On Metacritic, which assigns a normalized rating out of 100 to reviews from mainstream publications, it has an average score of 80 based on six reviews.

== Track listing ==
All tracks are written by Ray LaMontagne.

No.	Title	Length
1.	"Roll Me Mama, Roll Me"	4:05
2.	"I Was Born to Love You"	4:12
3.	"Strong Enough"	3:35
4.	"Summer Clouds"	4:25
5.	"We’ll Make It Through"	6:01
6.	"Misty Morning Rain"	5:40
7.	"Rocky Mountain Healin’"	4:16
8.	"Weeping Willow"	3:23
9.	"Morning Comes Wearing Diamonds"	3:58
10.	"Highway to the Sun"	5:31

== Personnel ==
- Ray LaMontagne – vocals, acoustic & electric guitars, harmonica, bass, drums, percussion, keyboards, engineering, production.

== Charts ==
Chart performance for Monovision
Chart (2020)	Peak position
Scottish Albums (OCC)	21
Swiss Albums (Schweizer Hitparade)	50
US Billboard 200	163
