= God Willin' & the Creek Don't Rise =

Studio album by Ray LaMontagne
- Released: August 17, 2010 (US)
- Recorded: March 15–28, 2010
- Studios: The Big Room, Apple Hill, (Massachusetts)
- Genre: Country
- Length: 44:27
- Label: RCA/Stone Dwarf/RED (US)
- Producer: Ray LaMontagne

Ray LaMontagne chronology
Gossip in the Grain (2008)	God Willin' & the Creek Don't Rise (2010)	Supernova (2014)

Professional ratings
Review scores
Source	Rating
AllMusic	3/5 stars
Rolling Stone	3/5 stars
Spin	7/10 stars
PopMatters	7/10 stars

God Willin' & the Creek Don't Rise is singer-songwriter Ray LaMontagne's fourth full-length release, which was released on August 17, 2010.

The record is credited to "Ray LaMontagne and the Pariah Dogs". This is the first time that LaMontagne has released music in collaboration with other artists, within the context of a band.

It is the first album that was completely produced by LaMontagne. The music was recorded in a period of two weeks at LaMontagne's home in Massachusetts.

On December 1, 2010, the album was nominated for two Grammy Awards, including Best Contemporary Folk Album, which it won. The song "Beg Steal or Borrow" was nominated for Song of the Year.

== Track listing ==
All tracks are written by Ray LaMontagne.

God Willin' & The Creek Don't Rise
No.	Title	Length
1.	"Repo Man"	6:08
2.	"New York City's Killing Me"	4:13
3.	"God Willin' & the Creek Don't Rise"	3:10
4.	"Beg Steal or Borrow"	4:32
5.	"Are We Really Through"	4:59
6.	"This Love is Over"	3:30
7.	"Old Before Your Time"	4:04
8.	"For the Summer"	3:52
9.	"Like Rock & Roll and Radio"	6:05
10.	"Devil's in the Jukebox"	3:54

== Personnel ==
Ray LaMontagne collaborated with the following musicians on this album:

- Ray LaMontagne – vocals and acoustic guitar on all tracks, harmonica on tracks 8, 9 and 10
- Jennifer Condos – bass on all tracks except track 9
- Jay Bellerose – drums on all tracks except tracks 5 and 9
- Eric Heywood – pedal steel guitar on tracks 2, 3, 4 and 5, acoustic guitar on tracks 6, 7 and 8, electric guitar on tracks 1 and 10
- Greg Leisz – electric guitar on tracks 1 and 4, pedal steel guitar on tracks 3 and 6, acoustic guitar on track 5, lap steel guitar on track 8, electric baritone guitar on track 2, banjo on track 7, acoustic resonator steel guitar and mandola on track 10
- Patrick Warren – keyboards on track 6
- Ryan Freeland – accordion on track 8

Technical

- Ray LaMontagne – producer
- Ryan Freeland – recorder and mixer
- Michael McDonald – management
- Megahn Foley – art direction and design
- Mark Seliger – portrait photography
- Tobias LaMontagne – still photography
- Jay Bellerose – additional photography
- Sarah Sousa – additional photography

== Charts ==
=== Weekly charts ===
Chart (2010)	Peak position
Australian Albums (ARIA)	41
Belgian Albums (Ultratop Flanders)	34
Belgian Albums (Ultratop Wallonia)	89
Canadian Albums (Billboard)	4
Dutch Albums (Album Top 100)	16
French Albums (SNEP)	69
Irish Albums (IRMA)	13
New Zealand Albums (RMNZ)	24
Scottish Albums (Official Charts)	17
Swedish Albums (Sverigetopplistan)	44
Swiss Albums (Schweizer Hitparade)	43
UK Albums (Official Charts)	17
US Billboard 200	3
US Top Rock Albums (Billboard)	1

=== Year-end charts ===
Chart (2010)	Position
US Billboard 200	177
US Top Rock Albums (Billboard)	45

== Certifications ==
Region	Certification	Certified units/sales
United States (RIAA)	Gold	500,000^{‡}
^{‡} Sales+streaming figures based on certification alone.
