= Supernova (Ray LaMontagne album) =

Studio album by Ray LaMontagne
- Released: April 29, 2014
- Genres: Psychedelic rock; folk rock
- Length: 42:39
- Labels: Stone Dwarf Records, RCA
- Producer: Dan Auerbach

Ray LaMontagne chronology
God Willin' & the Creek Don't Rise (2010)	Supernova (2014)	Ouroboros (2016)

Supernova is the fifth studio album by Ray LaMontagne, released by RCA Records on April 29, 2014. The title track serves as the album's lead single.

== Critical reception ==
Professional ratings
Aggregate scores
Source	Rating
Metacritic	78/100
Review scores
Source	Rating
The A.V. Club	B+
AllMusic	3.5/5 stars
New York Daily News	3/5 stars
The Guardian	4/5 stars
Knoxville News Sentinel	3.5/5 stars
Newsday	B+
Paste	7.5/10
PopMatters	7/10 discs
Rolling Stone	3.5/5 stars
USA Today	3/4 stars

Supernova garnered generally positive reception from music critics. At Metacritic, they assign a "weighted average" score to selected independent ratings and reviews. Based upon eight reviews, the album has a Metascore of 78; this means that it received "generally favorable" reviews. At Rolling Stone, Will Hermes rated the album three-and-a-half stars out of five, stating that "Predictably, [Dan] Auerbach [as producer] helps the singer pull bright colors from the Sixties' crayon box; less predictably, he makes it seem a perfectly logical progression of LaMontagne's 10-plus years of cozy vibes." Thom Jurek of AllMusic rated the album three-and-a-half stars out of five, writing that "Supernova is unapologetically and indulgently retro; a casual listen might dismiss it as mere nostalgia", however the "pairing [of]Auerbach's detailed, careful production with LaMontagne's open, expertly crafted songwriting and breezy, sensual, emotionally unburdened signing, that boundary is shattered." At The Guardian, Dave Simpson rated the album four stars out of five, remarking how "There's nothing here that's exactly new, but by assembling an array of unexpected influences in one blissful place, Lamontagne has crafted an unlikely perfect summer soundtrack."

At The A.V. Club, Chris Mincher graded the album a B+, saying that "Supernova is a surprisingly bold, enterprising follow-up from an artist who could have easily ridden out the rest of his career on adult-alternative autopilot." In addition, Mincher remarking that "Supernova's experiments aren’t all triumphs by any means, but, given how painless it would have been to stay the course, LaMontagne is to be commended for taking on a challenge at all." At Paste, Hilary Saunders rated the album a 7.5 out of 10, stating how "Supernova sounds like a foray into the exploratory sonic terrains created by those who simply can." Saunders closing with saying that "Supernova represents the idealistic (and exospheric) possibilities for LaMontagne after 10 years in the industry, what gets lost in the experimentation is the emotional connection previously forged though clear playing and exposed lyricism." At Knoxville News Sentinel, Chuck Campbell rated the album three-and-a-half stars out of five, observing that "change is constant" with the release that "results in a chameleonic" and this "will attract some and repel others."

At PopMatters, Will Layman rated the album seven out of ten discs, writing that "The result might just lull you into tomorrow" because "LaMontagne thread his needle through many styles, mostly good ones." Elysa Gardner of USA Today rated the album three out of four stars, stating that "LaMontagne's folky sound takes on a psychedelic edge, with tracks that present delicate tunes in spacious, trippy arrangements", so "If his grainy vocals can seem a little less grounded, his nods to the past are canny and passionate, so the mix rises above nostalgia." At Newsday, Glenn Gamboa graded the album a B+, writing that " LaMontagne succeeds in ripping down everything from his" past. However, Jim Farber of New York Daily News rated the album three stars out of five, saying that "Auerbach's sound proves too defining, making the star seem like he’s trying to squeeze into another man’s clothes", yet "Due to the depth of LaMontagne’s talent, any recording by him has automatic conviction and appeal."

== Track listing ==
All tracks are written by Ray LaMontagne.

Track list
No.	Title	Length
1.	"Lavender"	4:25
2.	"Airwaves"	4:41
3.	"She's the One"	3:17
4.	"Pick Up a Gun"	5:05
5.	"Julia"	3:21
6.	"No Other Way"	3:37
7.	"Supernova"	3:55
8.	"Ojai"	4:35
9.	"Smashing"	4:40
10.	"Drive-In Movies"	5:03
Total length:		42:39

== Personnel ==
- Ray LaMontagne – vocal, acoustic guitar
- Dan Auerbach – electric guitar, background vocals, acoustic guitar, electric bass, claves, claps, Mellotron
- Richard Swift – drums, background vocals, percussion, claps, electronic drums
- Dave Roe – electric bass, upright bass
- Leon Michels – tambourine, Mellotron, piano, Hammond organ, electric harpsichord, Wurlitzer, electric piano, percussion, acetone, cabasa, glockenspiel, claps
- Kenny Vaughan – electric guitar, acoustic guitar, tambourine
- Russ Pahl – pedal steel, baritone electric guitar, acoustic guitar, 12-string acoustic guitar, electric guitar, tick tack bass
- Seth Kaufman – electronic percussion, snaps, electric guitar, percussion, background vocals, claps, conga, drums, baritone electric guitar
- Collin Dupuis – drum programming

== Charts ==
Chart (2014)	Peak position
Canadian Albums (Billboard)	4
US Billboard 200	3
US Top Rock Albums (Billboard)	1
US Americana/Folk Albums (Billboard)	1

=== Year-end charts ===
Chart (2014)	Position
US Folk Albums (Billboard)	6
US Top Rock Albums (Billboard)	49
