= Gossip in the Grain =

2008 studio album by Ray LaMontagne

Studio album by Ray LaMontagne
- Released: October 14, 2008
- Recorded: Box, England
- Genres: Folk, soul
- Labels: RCA/BMG/Stone Dwarf/RED (US); 14th Floor (UK)
- Producer: Ethan Johns

Ray LaMontagne chronology
Till the Sun Turns Black (2006)	Gossip in the Grain (2008)	God Willin' & the Creek Don't Rise (2010)

Professional ratings
Review scores
Source	Rating
AllMusic	4/5 stars
PopMatters	8/10 stars
Rolling Stone	3/5 stars
Spin	3/5 stars
Stereokill	4/5 stars
This Is Fake DIY	5/10 stars
Uncut	4/5 stars

Gossip in the Grain is the third studio album by American singer-songwriter Ray LaMontagne, released on October 14, 2008. It was produced by Ethan Johns and recorded in Box, England. Along with his band members, LaMontagne is also joined by the singer-songwriter Leona Naess on "A Falling Through" and "I Still Care for You". As commented on LaMontagne's website, the new album "proves to be his most creative and emotionally expansive collection to date".

== Track listing ==
All tracks are written by Ray LaMontagne.

Gossip in the Grain track listing
No.	Title	Length
1.	"You Are the Best Thing"	3:53
2.	"Let It Be Me"	4:41
3.	"Sarah"	4:31
4.	"I Still Care for You"	4:07
5.	"Winter Birds"	6:20
6.	"Meg White"	4:16
7.	"Hey Me, Hey Mama"	4:27
8.	"Henry Nearly Killed Me (It's a Shame)"	4:25
9.	"A Falling Through"	4:28
10.	"Gossip in the Grain"	3:59

iTunes bonus tracks
No.	Title	Length
11.	"Empty" (live)	5:50
12.	"Be Here Now" (live)	6:16
13.	"Roses and Cigarettes"	4:18
14.	"Achin' All the Time"	2:39
15.	"Trouble"	4:01

== Personnel ==
- Ray LaMontagne – songwriting, vocals, acoustic guitar, electric guitar (6), harmonica (8)
- Ethan Johns – producer, drums (1, 2, 4, 6, 8, 9), bass (1, 3, 6), electric guitar (1), piano (2), B-3 (2), string arrangement (2, 3, 10), ukulele (3), percussion (3), Wurlitzer (6), Mellotron (6, 10), backing vocals (6, 7), banjo (7)
- Jennifer Condos – bass guitar (2, 4, 7, 8, 9), drums (7), backing vocals (7)
- Eric Heywood – guitar (2, 8), pedal steel (4, 9), acoustic guitar (7), backing vocals (7)
- Leona Naess – backing vocals (4, 9, 10)
- Dominic Monks – synthesizer (4)

== Charts ==
Chart performance for Gossip in the Grain
Chart (2008)	Peak position
Australian Albums (ARIA)	73
Belgian Albums (Ultratop Flanders)	25
Dutch Albums (Album Top 100)	48
French Albums (SNEP)	107
Irish Albums (IRMA)	14
New Zealand Albums (RMNZ)	32
UK Albums (Official Charts)	23
US Billboard 200	3
US Independent Albums (Billboard)	1
US Top Rock Albums (Billboard)	1

== Certifications ==
Region	Certification	Certified units/sales
United States (RIAA)	Gold	500,000^{‡}
^{‡} Sales+streaming figures based on certification alone.
