= Till the Sun Turns Black =

Studio album by Ray LaMontagne
- Released: August 29, 2006
- Studios: Allaire, Shokan, New York; Three Crows, North Hollywood, Los Angeles, California
- Genre: Folk rock
- Length: 48:13
- Labels: RCA (US); 14th Floor Records (UK)
- Producer: Ethan Johns

Ray LaMontagne chronology
Trouble (2004)	Till the Sun Turns Black (2006)	Gossip in the Grain (2008)

Singles from Till the Sun Turns Black
- 1. "Be Here Now" Released: June 18, 2007; 2. "Three More Days" Released: August 20, 2007

Professional ratings
Review scores
Source	Rating
AllMusic	4/5 stars
Artistdirect	3/5 stars
Being There Magazine	3/5 stars
Claus	8/10
Modern Guitars	positive
Rolling Stone	2.5/5 stars

Till the Sun Turns Black is singer-songwriter Ray LaMontagne's second full-length album, which was released in the US on August 29, 2006. The album was produced by Ethan Johns and recorded at Allaire Studios in Shokan, New York. The album was a commercial success, becoming a Top 40 album, selling 28,000 copies in its first week of release. The album was released in the UK on June 18, 2007, where it peaked at No. 35 on the UK Albums Chart.

== Track listing ==
All songs written by Ray LaMontagne.

1. "Be Here Now" – 6:23
2. "Empty" – 5:17
3. "Barfly" – 3:55
4. "Three More Days" – 3:36
5. "Can I Stay" – 3:41
6. "You Can Bring Me Flowers" – 4:12
7. "Gone Away from Me" – 4:27
8. "Lesson Learned" – 4:39
9. "Truly, Madly, Deeply" – 1:52
10. "Till The Sun Turns Black" – 4:28
11. "Within You" – 5:43

== Singles ==
- "Can I Stay" (promo only) (August 29, 2006)
- "Be Here Now" (June 18, 2007)
- "Three More Days" (August 20, 2007)

"Be Here Now" was the first British single from the album. It was released on limited edition 7-inch vinyl (limited to 500 copies only) on June 18, 2007, to coincide with the release of the album there. The B-side is a previously unreleased live version of "Be Here Now." It is also featured in the trailer for the 2006 motion picture Away from Her and in season 1 finale of Covert Affairs.

== Personnel ==
- Ray LaMontagne – vocals, acoustic guitar, electric guitar (6), Spanish guitar (8, 9), Rhodes piano (9)
- Ethan Johns – drums (3, 4, 6, 11), percussion (2, 10), bass guitar (2, 3, 4, 6, 11), electric guitar (3, 4), ukulele (7, 11), dobro (6), acoustic bass (7), B3 (3), programming (6), piano/synthesizer (1), acoustic guitar/reed organ/harmony vocal (11)
- John Medeski – Wurlitzer electric piano on "Three More Days"
- Rachael Yamagata – background vocals on "Barfly"
- Antoine Silverman – violin
- Lorenza Ponce – violin
- Chris Cardona – violin
- David Gold – violin, viola
- Jane Scarpantoni – cello
- Dave Eggar – cello
- Brad Jones – bowed bass (1, 10, 11)
- Peck Allmond – trumpet (4, 6), euphonium/mellophone (7, 11), flute (6)
- Michael Blake – tenor saxophone (4, 6)
- Jack Schatz – euphonium (10)
- Vincent Chancey – French horn (10)

== Charts ==
=== Album ===
Year	Chart	Position
2007	UK Albums Chart	35
2006	The Billboard 200	28

== Certifications ==
Region	Certification	Certified units/sales
United States (RIAA)	Gold	500,000^{‡}
^{‡} Sales+streaming figures based on certification alone.
