= Part of the Light =

Studio album by Ray LaMontagne
- Released: May 18, 2018
- Studio: The Big Room
- Genres: Folk rock, soul
- Length: 46:04
- Label: RCA
- Producer: Ray LaMontagne

Ray LaMontagne chronology
Ouroboros (2016)	Part of the Light (2018)	Monovision (2020)

Part of the Light is the seventh studio album by Ray LaMontagne, released on May 18, 2018, via RCA Records. "Such a Simple Thing" was released as the lead single.

== Reception ==
Professional ratings
Aggregate scores
Source	Rating
Metacritic	74/100
Review scores
Source	Rating
AllMusic	3.5/5 stars
Exclaim!	7/10
The Independent	3/5 stars
NME	3/5 stars

Part of the Light received generally favorable reviews from critics. On Metacritic, which assigns a normalized rating out of 100 to reviews from mainstream publications, the album received an average score of 74 based on 7 reviews.

== Track listing ==
All songs written by Ray LaMontagne.

1. "To the Sea"
2. "Paper Man"
3. "Part of the Light"
4. "It's Always Been You"
5. "Let's Make It Last"
6. "As Black as Blood Is Blue"
7. "Such a Simple Thing"
8. "No Answer Arrives"
9. "Goodbye Blue Sky"

== Charts ==
Chart (2018)	Peak position
Belgian Albums (Ultratop Flanders)	52
Belgian Albums (Ultratop Wallonia)	100
Canadian Albums (Billboard)	44
Dutch Albums (Album Top 100)	60
Irish Albums (IRMA)	40
UK Albums (Official Charts)	28
UK Americana Albums (Official Charts)	1
New Zealand Heatseeker Albums (RMNZ)	6
Scottish Albums (Official Charts)	9
US Billboard 200	40
US Americana/Folk Albums (Billboard)	2
US Top Album Sales (Billboard)	10
US Top Alternative Albums (Billboard)	5
US Top Rock Albums (Billboard)	6
US Vinyl Albums (Billboard)	8
