= Ouroboros (Ray LaMontagne album) =

Studio album by Ray LaMontagne
- Released: March 4, 2016
- Recorded: February 2015
- Studio: La La Land, Louisville, Kentucky, United States
- Genre: Psychedelic rock, folk rock
- Length: 39:37
- Label: RCA
- Producer: Jim James

Ray LaMontagne chronology
Supernova (2014)	Ouroboros (2016)	Part of the Light (2018)

Singles from Ouroboros
- 1. "Hey, No Pressure" Released: January 20, 2016; 2. "The Changing Man" / "While It Sill Beats" Released: July 1, 2016

Ouroboros is the sixth studio album by Ray LaMontagne, released on March 4, 2016. It features My Morning Jacket's frontman Jim James, who also produced the record. Lead single "Hey, No Pressure" debuted online on January 20, 2016. The rest of My Morning Jacket, minus James, joined LaMontagne on the road for the album's release tour.

== Critical reception ==
Professional ratings
Aggregate scores
Source	Rating
Metacritic	80/100 (10 reviews)
Review scores
Source	Rating
AllMusic	3.5/5 stars
American Songwriter	4/5 stars
Drowned in Sound	8/10

According to the review aggregator Metacritic, Ouroboros received "generally favorable reviews" based on a weighted average score of 80 out of 100 from 10 critic scores. Editors at AllMusic rated this album 3.5 out of 5 stars, with critic Marcy Donelson writing that this "is a deliberate work of album rock". Writing for American Songwriter, Lee Zimmerman scored this release 4 out of 5, calling it "one of the more challenging major label efforts released this year". At Drowned in Sound, Haydon Spenceley gave this album an 8 out of 10, cautioning listeners that "it's so different from the majority of [LaMontagne's] previous output that it might take some time to truly get to grips with".

== Track listing ==
All songs written by Ray LaMontagne.

Part One

1. "Homecoming" – 8:28
2. "Hey, No Pressure" – 6:34
3. "The Changing Man" – 4:13
4. "While It Still Beats" – 4:10

Part Two

5. "In My Own Way" – 6:36
6. "Another Day" – 3:05
7. "A Murmuration of Starlings" – 2:33
8. "Wouldn't It Make a Lovely Photograph" – 3:58

== Personnel ==
- Ray LaMontagne – vocals (1–6, 8), electric guitar (2, 3, 4, 5, 7), acoustic guitar (1, 2, 5, 6, 8)
- Dan Dorff – CP70 (1, 3–8), RMI (1, 3, 4, 5, 7), piano (1, 3, 4), vibes (1, 7), Mellotron (3, 4), Trident synthesizer (3, 7), Multivox piano (2), Juno (2), pump organ (5), pocket piano (7)
- Meghan Foley – art direction, design
- Anne Gauthier – assistant
- Dave Givan – drums, percussion (1–5, 7, 8)
- Jim James – electric guitar (2, 3, 4, 5, 7), background vocals (2, 3, 4, 5), saxophone (2), Juno (2), Trident synthesizer (7)
- Seth Kaufman – bass (1–5, 7, 8), meditation box (1, 5, 6, 7), electric guitar textures (1, 2), slide guitar (2)
- Bob Ludwig – mastering
- Alexis Marsh – background vocals (3, 4)
- Kevin Ratterman – Moog bass (5, 7), piano strings (1), pocket piano (2), Moog F/X (6)
- Brian Stowell – photography

== Charts ==
Sales chart performance of Ouroboros
Chart (2016)	Peak position
Australian Albums (ARIA)	44
Belgian Albums (Ultratop Flanders)	44
Belgian Albums (Ultratop Wallonia)	130
Canadian Albums (Billboard)	13
Dutch Albums (Album Top 100)	22
Irish Albums (IRMA)	54
UK Albums (OCC)	49
US Billboard 200	13
