= Trouble (Ray LaMontagne album) =

Studio album by Ray LaMontagne
- Released: September 14, 2004
- Recorded: 2004
- Studio: Sunset Sound (Hollywood, California)
- Genre: Folk rock
- Length: 41:24
- Label: RCA/BMG/Stone Dwarf
- Producer: Ethan Johns

Ray LaMontagne chronology
Trouble (2004)	Till the Sun Turns Black (2006)

Singles from Trouble
- 1. "Trouble" Released: February 21, 2005; 2. "Trouble (New Radio Mix)" Released: July 24, 2006; 3. "How Come" Released: October 30, 2006; 4. "Jolene" Released: April 2, 2007

Professional ratings
Review scores
Source	Rating
AllMusic	3.5/5 stars
Drowned in Sound	9/10
Mojo	3/5 stars
MusicOMH	4/5 stars
PopMatters	7/10
Rolling Stone	3/5 stars
Uncut	4/5 stars
The Village Voice	C+

Trouble is the debut studio album by singer-songwriter Ray LaMontagne. It was released on September 14, 2004, in the United States, and on September 20, 2004, in the United Kingdom. Although the album was released in 2004, the song didn't enter the top five of the UK charts until August 2006. The album was produced by Ethan Johns, released on RCA Records, marketed by BMG and distributed by Stone Dwarf Records. The album has sold 239,000 copies in the United States, according to Nielsen SoundScan. Jennifer Stills and Sara Watkins are featured on several tracks. The album cover was designed by Jason Holley, and was chosen by LaMontagne as a "powerful and poetic piece of art".

== Track listing ==
All lyrics are written by Ray LaMontagne, except "Hold You in My Arms", written with Ethan Johns.

No.	Title	Length
1.	"Trouble"	4:01
2.	"Shelter"	4:36
3.	"Hold You in My Arms"	5:06
4.	"Narrow Escape"	4:39
5.	"Burn"	2:54
6.	"Forever My Friend"	5:44
7.	"Hannah"	5:42
8.	"How Come"	4:32
9.	"Jolene"	4:10
10.	"All the Wild Horses"	3:16

== Personnel ==
- Ray LaMontagne – vocals, acoustic guitar, harmonica
- Ethan Johns – producer, engineer, mixing, string arrangements, additional guitar, drums, percussion, piano, bass guitar, harmonium
- David Low – cello, contractor
- Julie Gigante – violin
- Phillipe Levy – violin
- Mark Robertson – violin
- Roger Wilkie – violin
- Sara Watkins – fiddle on "Hannah" and "Jolene"; backing vocals on "Hannah"
- Jen Stills – backing vocals on "Narrow Escape"

Technical

- Chris Reynolds – engineer
- Ashley Newton, Steve Ralbovsky, James Cerreta – A&R
- Robin C. Hendrickson, Brett Kilroe – art direction

== Charts ==
=== Weekly charts ===
Chart (2004)	Peak position
French Albums (SNEP)	164

Chart (2006)	Peak position
Irish Albums (IRMA)	4
Scottish Albums (OCC)	61
UK Albums (OCC)	5

Chart (2015)	Peak position
US Billboard 200	164
US Top Catalog Albums (Billboard)	13

=== Year-end charts ===
Chart (2006)	Position
UK Albums (OCC)	74
Chart (2007)	Position
UK Albums (OCC)	153

== Certifications ==
Region	Certification	Certified units/sales
United Kingdom (BPI)	Platinum	484,929
United States (RIAA)	Platinum	1,000,000^{‡}
^{‡} Sales+streaming figures based on certification alone.

== Covers ==
Popular Australian singer-songwriter Missy Higgins did a cover for the song "Burn" on January 20, 2005, at the Cairns Convention Centre in Australia. "Jolene," was also covered by the Zac Brown Band, a country music band.

== Usage in media ==
"Burn", "Trouble", and "All the Wild Horses" were all featured in the second season of the American television show Rescue Me.

The song "Shelter" was featured in the film Prime (2005).

The song "How Come" was featured in the film The Devil Wears Prada (2006).

"Hold You In My Arms" was featured in the 2007 season finale of the television show Grey's Anatomy.

The song "Jolene" plays during the ending credits of the film The Town (2010).
