= Ray LaMontagne =

American singer-songwriter

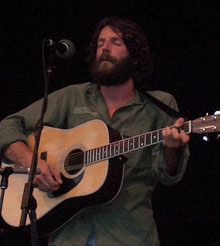
- LaMontagne at Prospect Park, Jul 12, 2006

Background information
- Born: Raymond Charles Jack LaMontagne; June 18, 1973 (age 53); Nashua, New Hampshire, U.S.
- Origin: Lewiston, Maine
- Genres: Folk; rock; folk rock; folk blues; soul
- Instruments: Vocals; guitar; piano; harmonica
- Label: RCA
- Website: raylamontagne.com

Raymond Charles Jack LaMontagne (/ˌlɑːmɒnˈteɪn/; born June 18, 1973) is an American singer-songwriter and musician. He was born in New Hampshire and was inspired to create music after hearing an album by Stephen Stills. Critics have compared LaMontagne's music to that of Otis Redding, Ryan Adams, Beck, Pink Floyd, The Band, Van Morrison, Nick Drake and Tim Buckley.

== Early life, family and education ==
LaMontagne was born in Nashua, New Hampshire, in 1973, one of six children raised by his single mother. In his early teens he lived in Morgan, Utah, and was more interested in drawing images of Dungeons & Dragons than in his school work.

After graduating from high school, LaMontagne moved to Lewiston, Maine, and worked at a shoe factory. LaMontagne also spent a significant amount of time in Wilton, Maine. Other sources state that by his teen years he was living in Maine, spending time in Turner and Buckfield.

== Career ==
=== 1999–2005: Trouble ===
LaMontagne was inspired to quit his job and begin a career as a singer-songwriter after waking up one morning to the radio on his alarm clock playing the Stephen Stills' song "Treetop Flyer". LaMontagne began performing in 1999 while maintaining a part-time job as a tutor. In the summer of 1999 he recorded 10 songs for a demo album that was sent to various local music venues including Maine's Oddfellow Theater, where he was hired as an opening act for John Gorka and Jonathan Edwards.

Ron Clayton, a business executive, discovered LaMontagne at a musical festival in Maine and introduced him to Chrysalis Music Publishing and in 2004 LaMontagne recorded the album Trouble with producer Ethan Johns and sold it to RCA Records in the US and Echo Records in the UK. The album featured performances by Sara Watkins and Jennifer Stills, daughter of Stephen Stills. The album sold over 250,000 copies in the US and 500,000 worldwide. During a 2005 tour, LaMontagne appeared on the PBS music program Austin City Limits (season 31, episode 4).

An EP of LaMontagne's performance at the Bonnaroo Music Festival was released in 2005 and his song "All the Wild Horses" was part of the soundtrack for the TV series Rescue Me and the 2009 film The Boys Are Back. His song "Trouble" appears in the TV series Alias as well as in a national television commercial for Travelers Insurance, and his song "Jolene" was heard in the credits of the 2010 film The Town. His song "Hold You in My Arms" was featured in the 2006 movie She's The Man.

In 2005, he performed at two charity events, a New York City fundraiser for the victims of Hurricane Katrina and the Warren Haynes Christmas Jam.

=== 2006: Till The Sun Turns Black ===
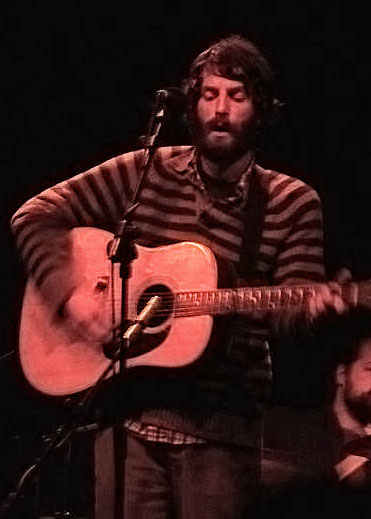
LaMontagne performing in Dublin, January 2007

LaMontagne's second album, Till the Sun Turns Black, was released in August 2006 and featured horn and string sections on several of the songs with Rachael Yamagata providing additional vocals on the song "Barfly". The album peaked at No. 28 on the Billboard 200 album chart, selling 28,000 copies in its first week of release. The album spawned the single "Three More Days". In 2006 LaMontagne performed on The Tonight Show.

The song "Till the Sun Turns Black" was featured on the television show ER, and the songs "Lesson Learned" and "Within You" appeared on the CW drama One Tree Hill. His song "Be Here Now" was heard on the trailer for the movie Away From Her, in the film 27 Dresses, on the TV shows Bones, Covert Affairs, New Amsterdam, and Brothers & Sisters. LaMontagne performed at KYSR's Lounge for Life charity concert on October 5, 2006, at the House of Blues in West Hollywood, California. He also auctioned off one of his guitars on eBay for its charity auction. Funds raised from the concert and auction went to breast cancer research.

=== 2008–2009: Gossip in The Grain ===
LaMontagne released his third studio album, Gossip in the Grain, on RCA Records in 2008. It debuted at No. 3 on the Billboard charts with 60,000 units sold. Working again with producer Ethan Johns, the album featured LaMontagne's touring band of Jennifer Condos on bass, Eric Heywood on guitar, and Ethan Johns on drums and guest vocals from singer-songwriter Leona Naess.

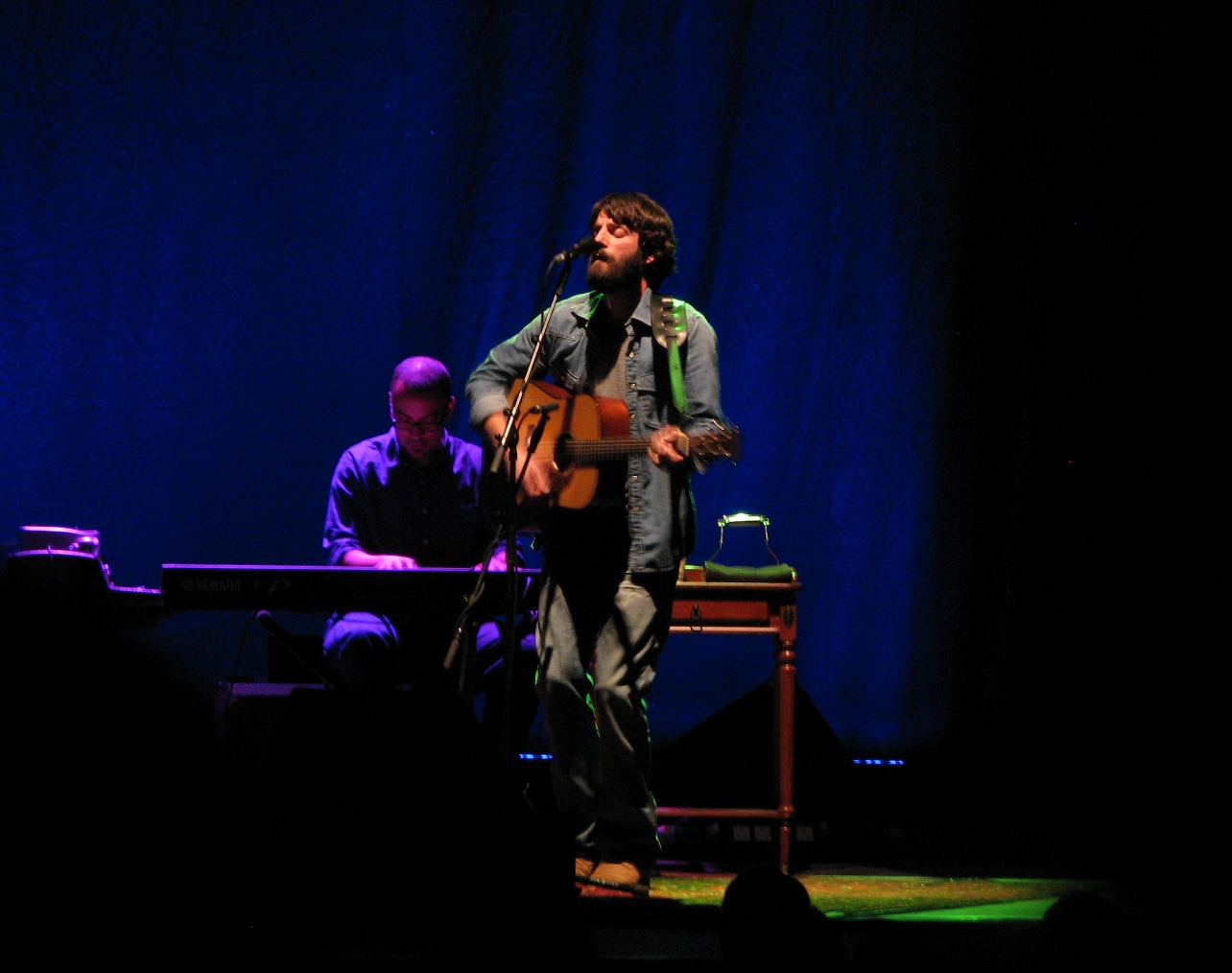
LaMontagne at The Sage Gateshead in 2009

The song "You Are the Best Thing" was featured in the movie I Love You, Man and in the television series One Tree Hill. LaMontagne performed on Saturday Night Live in March 2009. The songs "Sarah" and "I Still Care For You" appeared on the television series House. His song "Let It Be Me" was featured on the television series Parenthood and was included on the Parenthood soundtrack in 2010. It was also used in an episode titled "JJ" from the sixth season of Criminal Minds and in the seventh episode from season one of Fringe titled In Which We Meet Mr. Jones.

=== 2010–2011: God Willin' and the Creek Don't Rise ===
LaMontagne's self-produced studio album, God Willin' & the Creek Don't Rise, was released in August 2010. In December 2010, LaMontagne received Grammy nominations and won the award for Best Contemporary Folk Album.

In August 2010, he performed at a Nashville, Tennessee, charity event to raise money for victims of a local flood. The song, "Empty", appeared on an episode of Law & Order: Criminal Intent in 2010 and was heard during the film credits for the movie The Conspirator. It also appeared in Tony Kaye's film Detachment in 2011, released in the US in 2012. LaMontagne performed on the program Live from Abbey Road in October 2006. The New England native was featured on VH1 Storytellers in 2011.

In 2011 LaMontagne sang a duet with Irish singer Lisa Hannigan, "O Sleep", which was featured on her Choice Music Award-nominated album Passenger.

=== 2014–2015: Supernova ===
In April 2014 LaMontagne released his fifth album, Supernova. The album reached No. 2 on iTunes in the first several hours of its release. The album then went to number one on the Billboard Top Rock Albums chart. It was produced by Dan Auerbach of the Black Keys and recorded at his Nashville studio. The title track was made available for download on ITunes and Google Play Music on February 25, 2014. On October 9, 2014, LaMontagne spoke and performed at the Grammy Museum

Supernova garnered generally positive reception from music critics. At Rolling Stone, Will Hermes rated the album three and a half stars out of five, stating, "Predictably, [Dan] Auerbach [as producer] helps the singer pull bright colors from the Sixties' crayon box; less predictably, he makes it seem a perfectly logical progression of LaMontagne's 10-plus years of cozy vibes." Thom Jurek of AllMusic rated the album three and a half stars out of five, writing that "Supernova is unapologetically and indulgently retro; a casual listen might dismiss it as mere nostalgia"; however, the "pairing [of] Auerbach's detailed, careful production with LaMontagne's open, expertly crafted songwriting and breezy, sensual, emotionally unburdened singing, that boundary is shattered." At The Guardian, Dave Simpson rated the album four stars out of five, remarking, "There's nothing here that's exactly new, but by assembling an array of unexpected influences in one blissful place, LaMontagne has crafted an unlikely perfect summer soundtrack."

On July 23, 2014, during a show at the Meijer Gardens in Grand Rapids, Michigan, LaMontagne interrupted a song and walked off stage as a result of two fans talking during his concert, after having previously asked the audience to quiet down. The incident included yelling profanity at the couple before walking off stage. Once the couple was escorted away, LaMontagne continued the concert.

At The A.V. Club, Chris Mincher graded the album a B+, saying, "Supernova is a surprisingly bold, enterprising follow-up from an artist who could have easily ridden out the rest of his career on adult-alternative autopilot."

In May 2015, NBC's The Voice contestant Sawyer Fredericks performed "Please", a song written by LaMontagne early in his career and included on his self-released album Introducing Ray Lamontagne. The song immediately became the number two single on the iTunes chart, and Fredericks was declared the winner of the competition that same month.

=== 2016–2018: Ouroboros ===
LaMontagne released his sixth studio album, Ouroboros, in March 2016. The album was produced by Jim James of My Morning Jacket. LaMontagne stated that Ouroboros was written as a single arc, rather than a "batch of songs" and that it was intended for vinyl. He cited the Talk Talk album Spirit of Eden as stylistically similar to his vision of an unstructured, free-flowing album.

Ouroboros received positive reviews from critics. Critics noted the album's psychedelic qualities, comparing it to Pink Floyd's The Dark Side of the Moon.

On September 20, 2016, LaMontagne announced that he was canceling a September 22 show at the Bass Concert Hall at the University of Texas at Austin, due to Texas's recently implemented campus carry law.

=== 2018: Part of the Light ===
LaMontagne released his seventh studio album, Part of the Light, on May 18, 2018. The album is produced solely by LaMontagne. The first single released from the LP was "Such a Simple Thing', where those who purchased the album on LaMontagne's website received a stream of the live version of the track. LaMontagne commenced his "Part of the Light Tour" which kicked off May 27 at the Pacific Northwest Sasquatch Music Festival.

=== 2020: Monovision ===
LaMontagne released his eighth studio album, Monovision, on RCA Records in 2020.

=== 2024: Long Way Home ===
LaMontagne released his ninth studio album, Long Way Home, on August 16, 2024.

== Style ==
LaMontagne has a unique vocal style which he says is created by singing through his gut instead of through his nose. He cites Stephen Stills, Richard Manuel, and Rick Danko as strong musical influences, while critics have compared LaMontagne's music to that of The Band, Van Morrison, Nick Drake, and Tim Buckley. A Rolling Stone review of his album Supernova referred to his voice as an "impeccably weathered tenor croon" and his phrasing as "marble-mouthed."

== Awards ==
For his debut album, LaMontagne won four awards, including three Boston Music Awards (Best Male Singer-Songwriter, Album of the Year, and Song of the Year) and an XM Nation Music Award for Acoustic Rock Artist of the Year. LaMontagne has received a nomination from the Pollstar Concert Industry Awards for Best New Touring Artist, the BRIT Awards for International Breakthrough Act, the MOJO Awards for Best New Act, and was given the title of Best Voice in 2006 by Esquire.

In 2011, Ray LaMontagne and the Pariah Dogs received two Grammy Award nominations, and they were awarded the Grammy for the Best Contemporary Folk Album for God Willin' & the Creek Don't Rise.

== Personal life ==
In 2009, LaMontagne paid $1.05 million for a 103-acre farm in Ashfield, Massachusetts, the former residence of U.S. Ambassador William C. Bullitt, where he lives with his wife, Sarah Sousa, and their two children in the farmhouse built in 1830. Sousa is a published poet via Red Mountain Press, and their sons are budding artists. LaMontagne refers to himself as a "very private person" and rarely gives interviews.

== Discography ==
Studio albums

- Trouble (2004)
- Till the Sun Turns Black (2006)
- Gossip in the Grain (2008)
- God Willin' & the Creek Don't Rise (2010)
- Supernova (2014)
- Ouroboros (2016)
- Part of the Light (2018)
- Monovision (2020)
- Long Way Home (2024)
