= Robert Morton Organ Company =

American pipe organ manufacturer

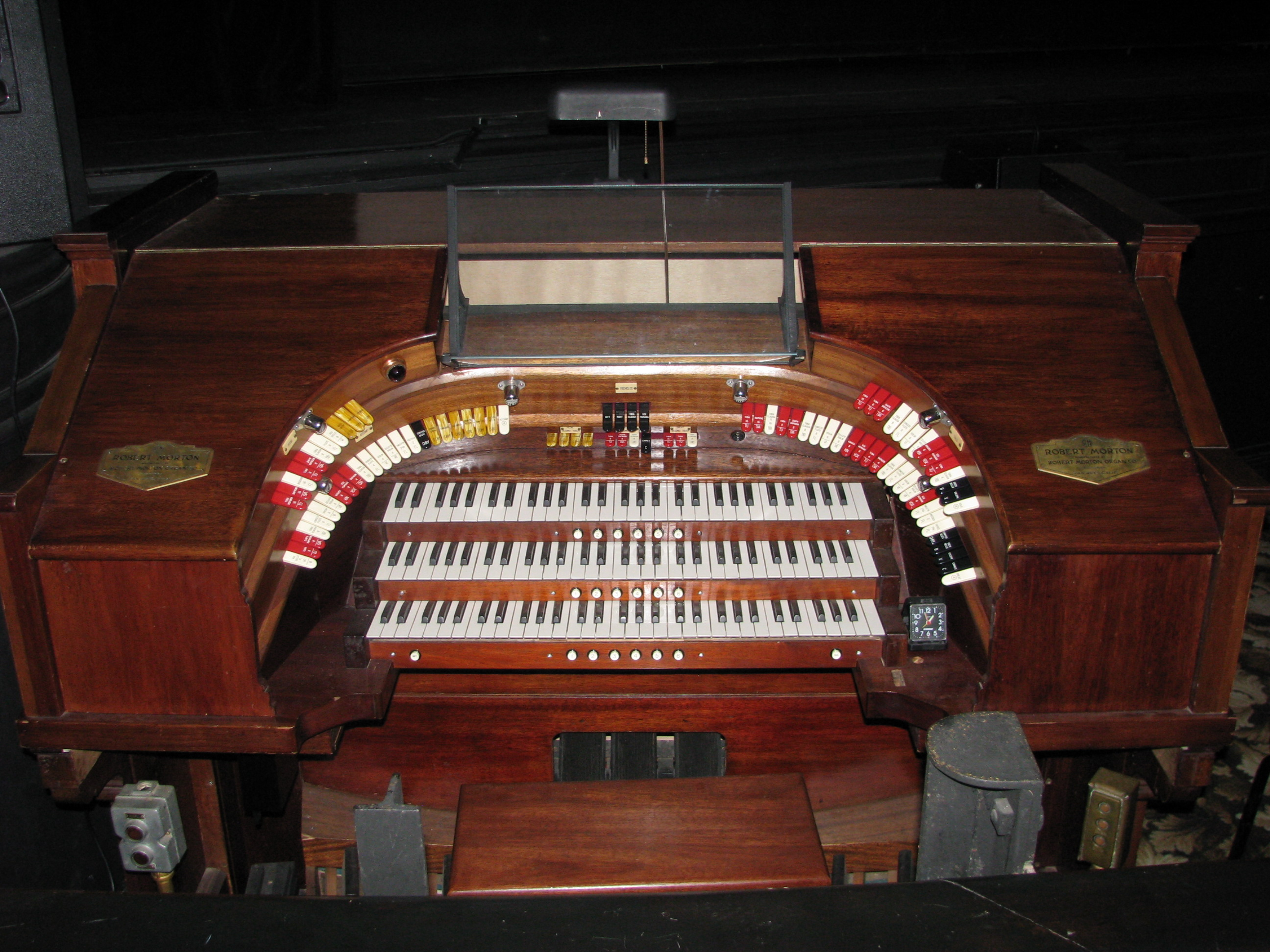
Console of Robert Morton Organ at the Jefferson Theatre

The Robert Morton Organ Company was an American producer of theater pipe organs and church organs, located in Van Nuys, California. Robert Morton was the number two volume producer of theatre organs, building approximately half as many organs as the industry leader Wurlitzer. The name Robert Morton was derived not from any person in the company, but rather from the name of company president Harold J. Werner's son, Robert Morton Werner.

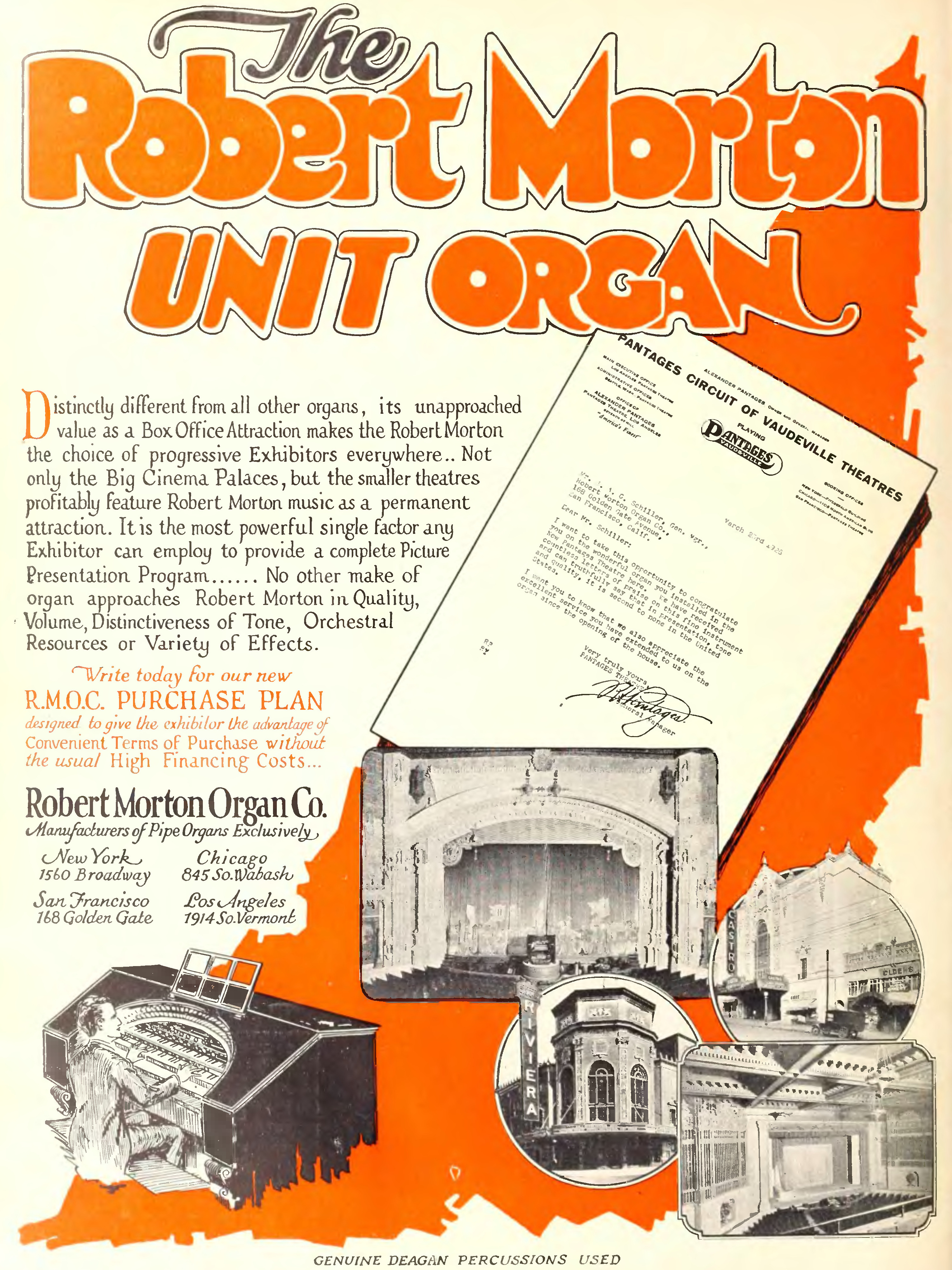
Robert Morton Unit Organ ad in Motion Picture News, 1926

The Robert Morton company had its origins in the second iteration of the Murray Harris Organ Company of Los Angeles. The company passed through various owners, business names and locations between Murray Harris and Robert Morton, including the Johnston Organ Company and the California Organ Company. [The short-lived Los Angeles Art Organ Co./Electrolian Organ Co. evolved from the first Murray M. Harris company.] Despite all the corporate change and upheaval, the output in terms of high quality and tonal character was remarkably consistent. Several Robert Morton key personnel were veteran organbuilders who had served as apprentices with major English organbuilding firms. Tonally, Robert Morton organs had a reputation for being powerful, while at the same time refined and "symphonic" in character.

The company's heyday was in the late 1920s, the era of the lavish movie palace theaters exhibiting silent films. The rise of the Great Depression and the advent of sound films eliminated the demand for theater organs and the company closed in 1931. In addition to their uses in theaters and music halls, Robert Morton organs have been featured in the music for the Haunted Mansion attractions at various Disney theme parks.

== Currently installed organs ==
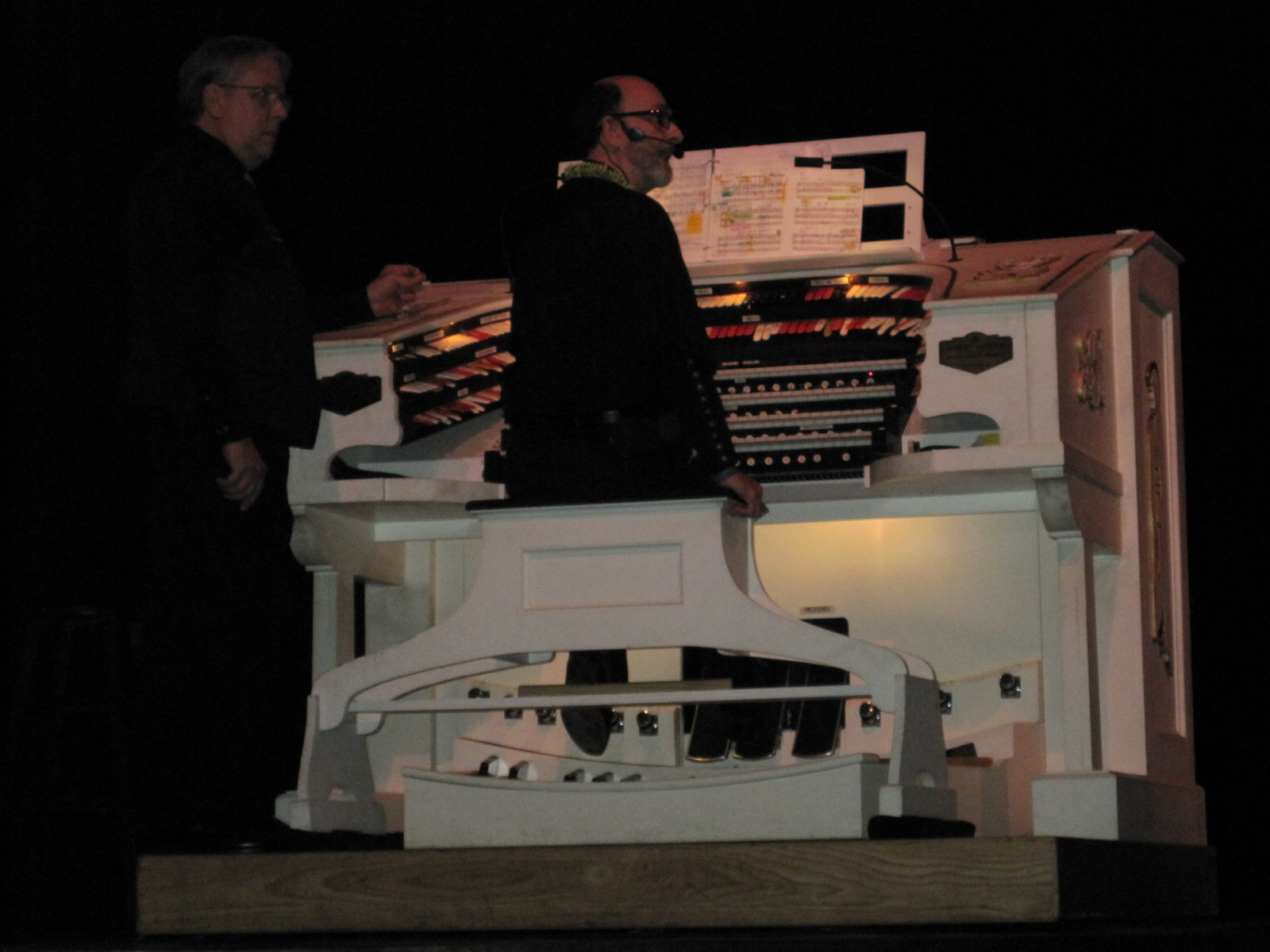
Robert Morton Organ, Hawaii Theatre

- Arlington Theatre, Santa Barbara, California (1928)
- Egyptian Theatre, Boise, Idaho (1927)
- Fox Theatre, Redwood City, California (1929)
- W. N. Shoberg & Company Pipe Organ Builders shop. Originally installed in Fox Theatre, Banning, California.
- Hawaii Theatre, Honolulu, Hawaii, originally installed Princess Theatre, Honolulu, Hawaii (1922), moved June 1969 to Hawaii Theatre, reinstalled by July 1971
- Ironstone Vineyards, Murphys, California. Originally installed in the Alhambra Theater, Sacramento, California (1927)
- Jefferson Theatre, Beaumont, Texas. (1927, restored in 2003. Damaged by Hurricane Rita in 2005. Restored again in 2022.)
- Loew's Jersey Theatre, Jersey City, New Jersey. Originally installed in Loew's Paradise Theatre, Bronx, New York (1929, reinstalled and restored by the Garden State Theatre Organ Society)
- McMenamins Chapel Pub, Portland, Oregon. 1925 organ installed in Chapel Pub 1933, moved from Strand Theater in Seaside, Oregon.
- Music Hall, Municipal Auditorium, Kansas City Missouri, (1928, formerly installed in the Midland Theatre)
- O'Brien Theatre, Renfrew, Ontario, Canada (ca. 1924, formerly installed in The Majestic Theatre, Santa Monica, California).
- Ohio Theatre, Columbus, Ohio (1928)
- Palace Theatre, Hilo, Hawaii (1929, 3 manuals, 7 ranks) Moved from Palace to Hilo Theatre in 1940; to a private residence in Honolulu in 1964; back to the Palace 1991, where it was reinstalled around 2000.
- Polk Theatre, Lakeland, Florida. 3 manuals, originally 11, now 12, ranks. Originally installed in Loews Theater in Canton, Ohio, this organ was subsequently moved to a private residence in Solon, Ohio and then to Scampi's Pizza Restaurant in Austin, Texas. As of April, 2016 it has been presenting pre-show programs at the Polk Theatre for approximately 15 years.
- Palace Theatre, Hilo Hawaii (2005, 4 manuals, 19 ranks) Originally installed at Hawaii Theatre, Honolulu, Hawaii (1922 as a 4/16); removed in 1937 and reinstalled in Waikiki Theatre, Honolulu, Hawaii in late June, 1938; removed 2004, 9 of its ranks merged with the 7 rank organ listed above and reinstalled by October, 2005
- Saenger Theatre, Hattiesburg, Mississippi (1929)
- Saenger Theatre, Mobile, Alabama (1927)
- Saenger Theatre, New Orleans, Louisiana (1927)
- Saenger Theatre, Pensacola, Florida (1927); currently undergoing restoration and enlargement by Thomas Helms, organ builder. Projected completed size is 52 ranks.
- Sinai Temple, Los Angeles, California
- Temple Theater, Meridian, Mississippi (1928)
- United Palace, formerly Loew's 175th St. Theatre, New York City (1930). Currently in restoration. The last remaining "Wonder Morton" in its original theatre, unaltered.
- Warnors Center for Performing Arts, Fresno, California (1928)
- Wilma Theatre, Missoula, Montana (1920)
- Jacobs Music Center, formerly Fox Theatre, San Diego California (1923). Organ was originally installed in the Balboa Theatre in San Diego, and moved to the new Fox Theatre in 1929 by Robert Morton. The organ is in regular use and currently being renovated by the San Diego Symphony.
- Balboa Theatre, San Diego, California (1929) Wonder Morton organ. Relocated from Loew's Valencia Theatre. Restored and installed by Wendell Shoberg in 2008-9. Replaces Balboa's original Robert Morton organ which was removed to the Fox theatre in 1929. Believed to be the first Wonder Morton built due to the more ornate console carvings and unique details the other Wonder Mortons lack.
- Carolina Theatre, Greensboro, North Carolina (1927)
- Bob Hope Theatre in Stockton, California
- Forum Theatre, Binghamton New York. 1922 Robert Morton 4/24 originally installed in the American Theatre in Denver Colorado
- Grace Baptist Church, San Jose, California, Robert Morton 3 manual, 20 ranks; originally in Liberty Theatre in San Jose, CA; 1940s youth project bought the organ and installed in the church, and it has been playing since; maintained by Bill Brooks; Church is closed; message (408) 295-2035 <Paul Wesley Bowen, Organist, several concerts in past few years>
- Speyer (Germany), Technik-Museum. 3 ranks, ~1927, imported from the US via Switzerland

== Defunct organs ==
- Avalon Theater, Brooklyn, New York (1927)
- Blue Mouse Theater, Tacoma, Washington (1923)
- Colonial Theater, Beach Haven, New Jersey (1940s, closed around 2000—now a private residence)
- Loew's Kings Theatre, Brooklyn, New York (1929). "Wonder Morton". Removed to van der Molen home in 1974; now dismantled in storage, as of 2017.
- Peninsula Theatre, Burlingame, California
- Plymouth Theatre, Worcester, Mass. (1928). Installed in private residence.
- Waikiki Theatre/Waikiki 3, Honolulu, Hawaii (1936, closed 2002)
