= Waikiki (disambiguation) =

Waikīkī is a neighborhood and beach in Honolulu, Oʻahu, Hawaii.

Waikiki may also refer to:

- Waikiki, Western Australia, a suburb of Perth
- Waikiki (band), a rock group from Sydney, Australia
- Waikiki (1980 film), an American television film
- Waikīkī (2020 film), a Hawaiian independent film
- The Waikikis, a Belgian studio band
- Waikiki Beach (Cape Disappointment), a beach in Cape Disappointment, Washington
- Waikiki Beech, a single-engine aircraft
- Waikiki Theatre, a now demolished theatre in Honolulu, Hawaii

== See also ==
- Welcome to Waikiki, a 2018 youth South Korean television series
- Welcome to Waikiki 2, a 2019 youth South Korean television series
