= Saenger Theatre =

Saenger Theatre (or Theater) may refer to any of the movie theatres in the defunct Saenger Theatre chain, including:

- Saenger Theatre (Mobile, Alabama)
- Saenger Theatre (Pine Bluff, Arkansas), listed on the US National Register of Historic Places
- Saenger Theatre (Pensacola, Florida), NRHP-listed
- Saenger Theatre (New Orleans), Louisiana, NRHP-listed
- Saenger Theater (Biloxi, Mississippi), NRHP-listed in Harrison County
- Saenger Theatre (Hattiesburg, Mississippi), NRHP-listed in Forrest County
- Saenger Theater (Texarkana, Texas), NRHP-listed in Bowie County
- The Strand Theatre of Shreveport, (Shreveport, Louisiana), NRHP-Listed the state theater of Louisiana and the flagship Saenger Theater

== See also ==
- Saengerfest Halle, or the Col Ballroom, Davenport, Iowa, NRHP-listed
