= Emile Weil =

American architect (1878–1945)

- Born: January 20, 1878; New Orleans, Louisiana, United States
- Died: January 19, 1945 (aged 66); New Orleans, Louisiana
- Resting place: Metairie Cemetery, New Orleans
- Education: Tulane University
- Occupation: Architect
- Years active: 1899–c. 1930

Emile Weil (January 20, 1878 – January 19, 1945) was an American architect. He studied with New Orleans' artist William Woodward. He is known best for his buildings in the Neo-Classical, Beaux-Arts and Spanish Revival styles. A number of his works are listed on the U.S. National Register of Historic Places.

== Notable works ==
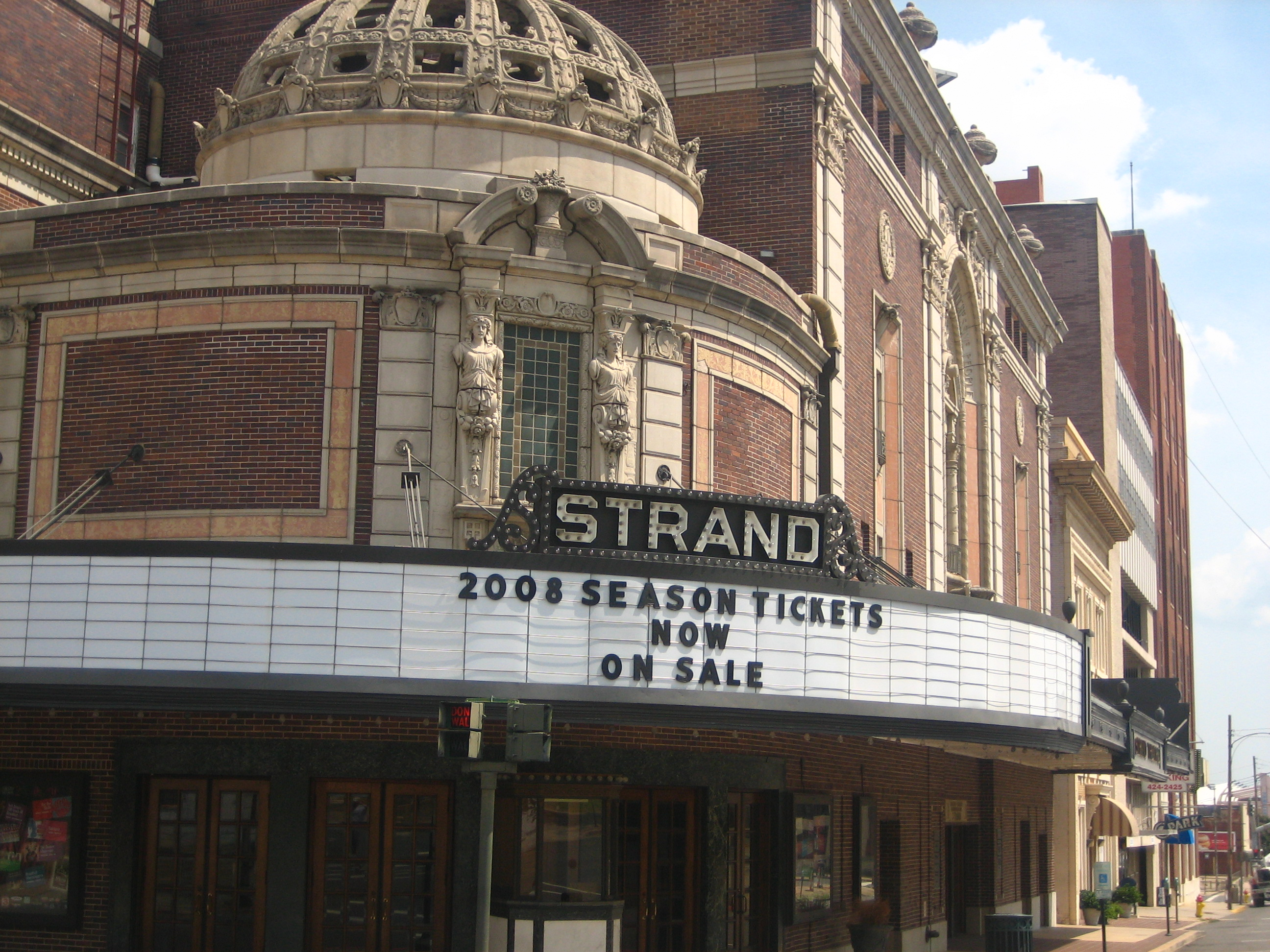
Strand Theatre in Shreveport, LA, completed in 1929

Years known

- Tuoro Synagogue (built 1909), New Orleans, LA
- S. H. Kress Department Store (built 1913), 923 Canal St, New Orleans, LA
- Pelican Stadium (built 1915), Tulane Ave., New Orleans, LA
- Jerusalem Temple of the Shriners of New Orleans (built 1916), (with Stone Bros., architects, now Church of the King), 1137 St. Charles Ave., New Orleans, LA
- Benjamin-Moore-Christovitch Residence (built 1916), 5531 St. Charles Ave., New Orleans, LA
- Union Bethel A.M.E. Church (built 1921), 2321 Thalia, New Orleans, LA, NRHP-listed, Gothic Revival style
- Hennen Building (1922 additions), 800 Common St., New Orleans, LA
- Maginnis Cotton Mill (1922 additions), 1054 Constance St., New Orleans, LA
- Crane Co. Building (built 1922), 1148 S. Peters St. New Orleans, LA, Mill Construction style
- Temple Theater (built c. 1923), 2318 8th St. Meridian, MS, NRHP-listed, Moorish Revival style
- Beth Israel synagogue (built 1924), 1610 Carondelet St., New Orleans, LA
- B. Lowenstein & Brothers Building (built 1924), 27 S. Main St. Memphis, TN, NRHP-listed, Beaux-Arts style
- Saenger Theatre (built 1924), in Pine Bluff, Arkansas, NRHP-listed
- Saenger Theatre (built 1924), renamed the Perot Theatre, 221 Main St, Texarkana, Texas, NRHP-listed
- Saenger Theatre (built 1925), 118 S. Palafox St. Pensacola, FL, NRHP-listed
- Strand Theater, (built 1925), 630 Crockett Shreveport, LA, NRHP-listed
- Bohn Motor Company Automotive Dealership (built 1926), South Broad St., New Orleans, LA
- Arabian Theatre (built 1927), in Laurel, Mississippi
- Four Winds (built 1927), 210 Baronne St., New Orleans, LA
- Jefferson Theatre (built 1927), 345 Fannin St. Beaumont, Texas, NRHP-listed
- Saenger Theatre (built 1927), in Mobile, Alabama
- Saenger Theatre (built 1927), 1111 Canal St. New Orleans, LA, NRHP-listed, Atmospheric theatre style
- Tivoli Theatre (built 1927), now Rhodes Pavilion, 3933 Washington Ave., New Orleans, LA
- Saenger Theatre (built 1929), in Hattiesburg, Mississippi, NRHP-listed, Art Deco style
- Paramount Theater (built 1930), 314 N. Washington Ave., Marshall, Texas

Years unknown

- Church of St. John the Evangelist, Plaquemine, LA
- Canal Bank & Trust Company, New Orleans, LA
- Dixie Brewery, New Orleans, LA
- Leon Fellman Building, 810 Canal St., New Orleans, LA
- Newberger House, 1640 Palmer Ave. New Orleans, LA, NRHP-listed
- Salomon Residence, 5428 St. Charles Ave., New Orleans, LA
- Whitney National Bank, St. Charles Ave., New Orleans, LA
