= Strand Theatre (Shreveport, Louisiana) =

- U.S. National Register of Historic Places
- U.S. Historic district – Contributing property
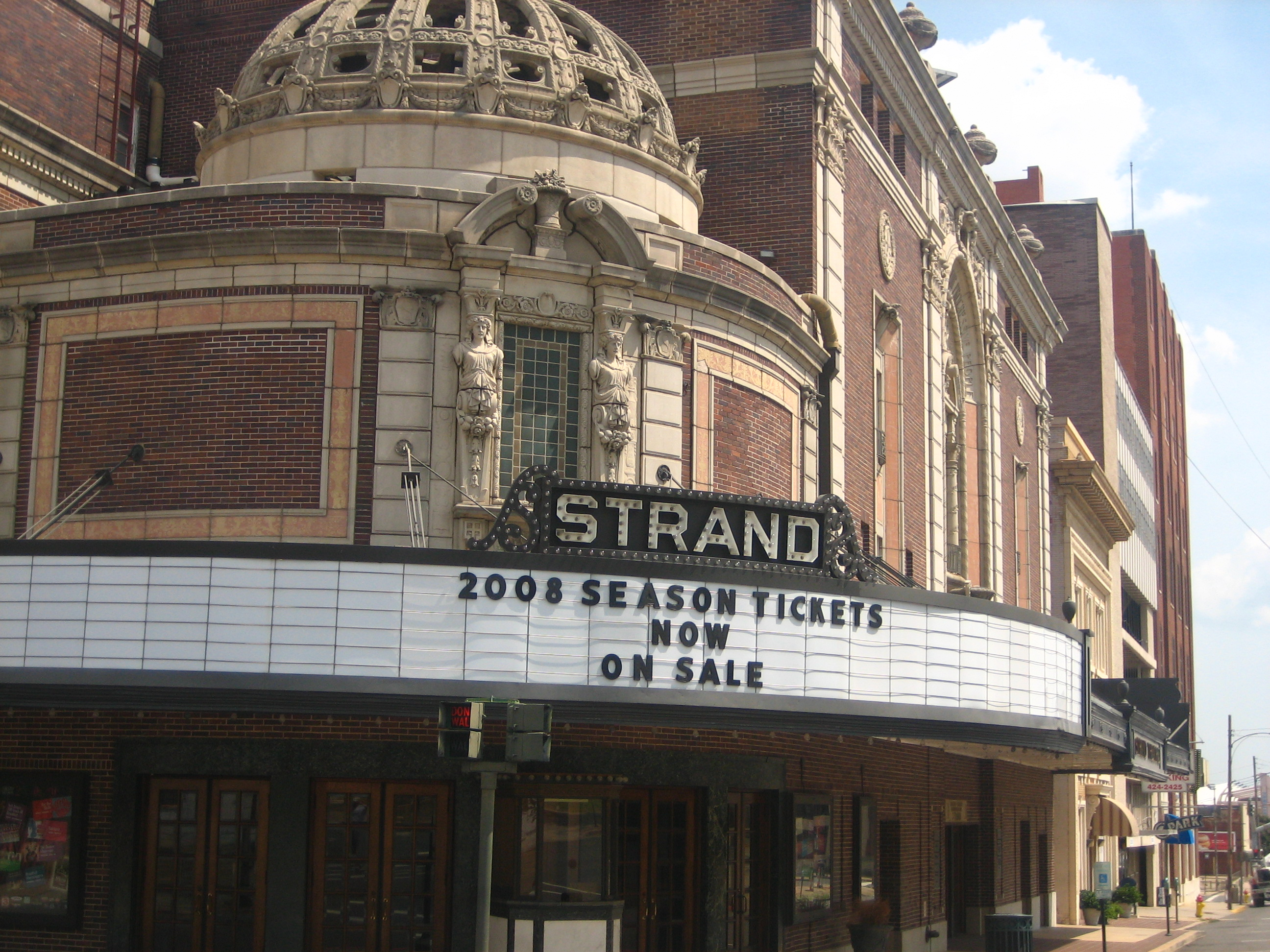
- Strand Theatre

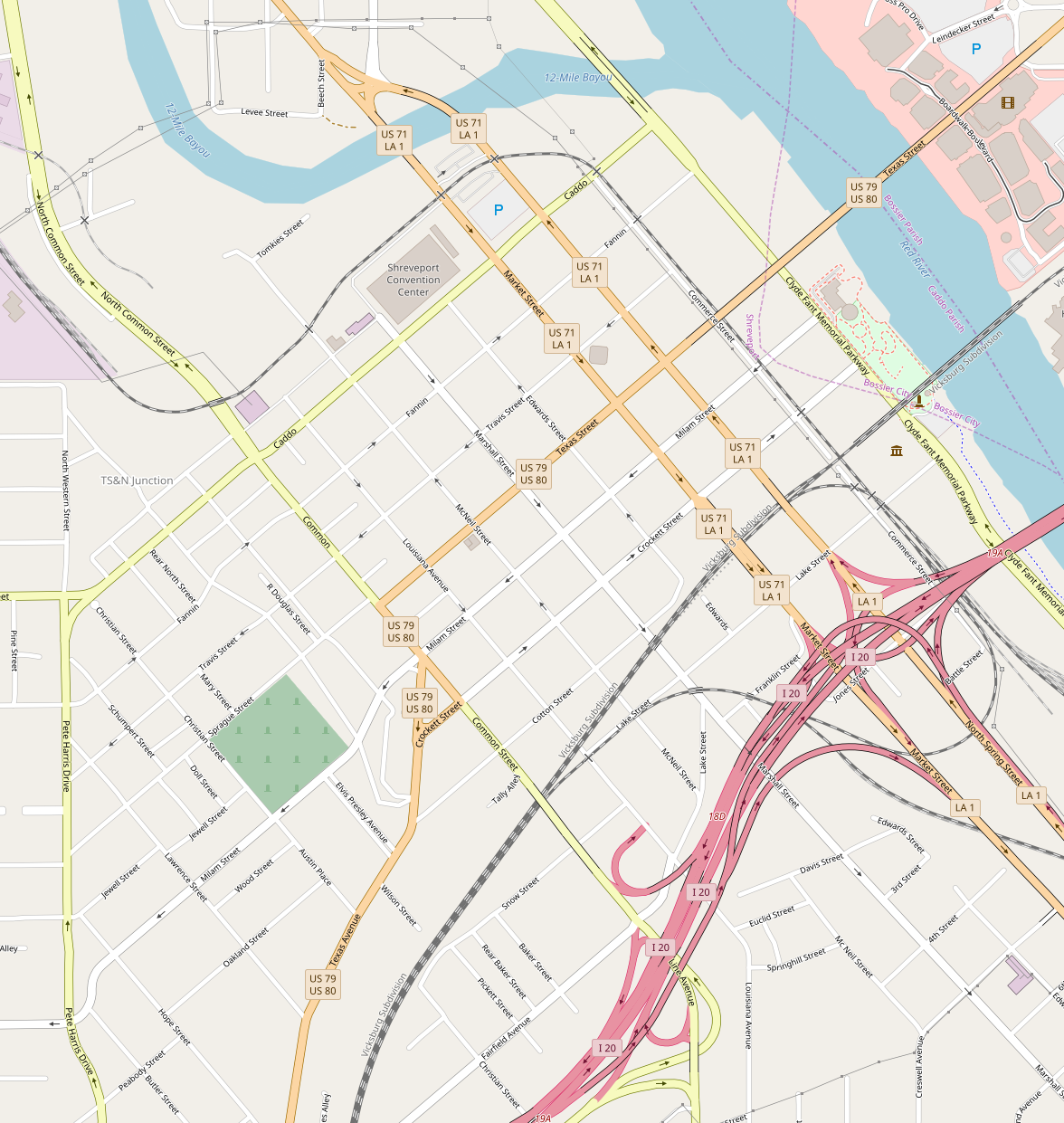
- Location within Shreveport Downtown
- Location: 630 Crockett Street, Shreveport, Louisiana
- Coordinates: 32°30′37″N 93°45′00″W
- Area: less than one acre
- Built: 1925
- Built by: Stewart-McGehee
- Architect: Emile Weil
- Architectural style: Eclectic
- Part of: Shreveport Commercial Historic District (ID82002760)
- NRHP reference No.: 77000668

Significant dates
- Added to NRHP: May 26, 1977
- Designated CP: May 16, 1997

The Strand Theatre in Shreveport, Louisiana, United States, opened in 1925 as a Vaudeville venue and was nicknamed "The greatest theatre of the South" and the "Million Dollar Theatre" by its builders, Julian and Abraham Saenger of Shreveport, owners of the Saenger Amusements Company, which operated theaters throughout the American South and in Central America. By the 1940s it had evolved into a movie cinema, which it remained until its closure in 1977. Threatened with demolition, it was saved by a coalition of concerned citizens who restored it to its original grandeur over a nearly seven-year period. It is the "Official State Theatre of Louisiana". Since its re-opening in 1984 following restoration it has served as a performing arts venue, featuring the Shreveport Broadway Series and other traveling Off-Broadway shows.

In 1977, the theatre was placed on the National Register of Historic Places. It also became a contributing property of Shreveport Commercial Historic District when its boundaries were increased on May 16, 1997.

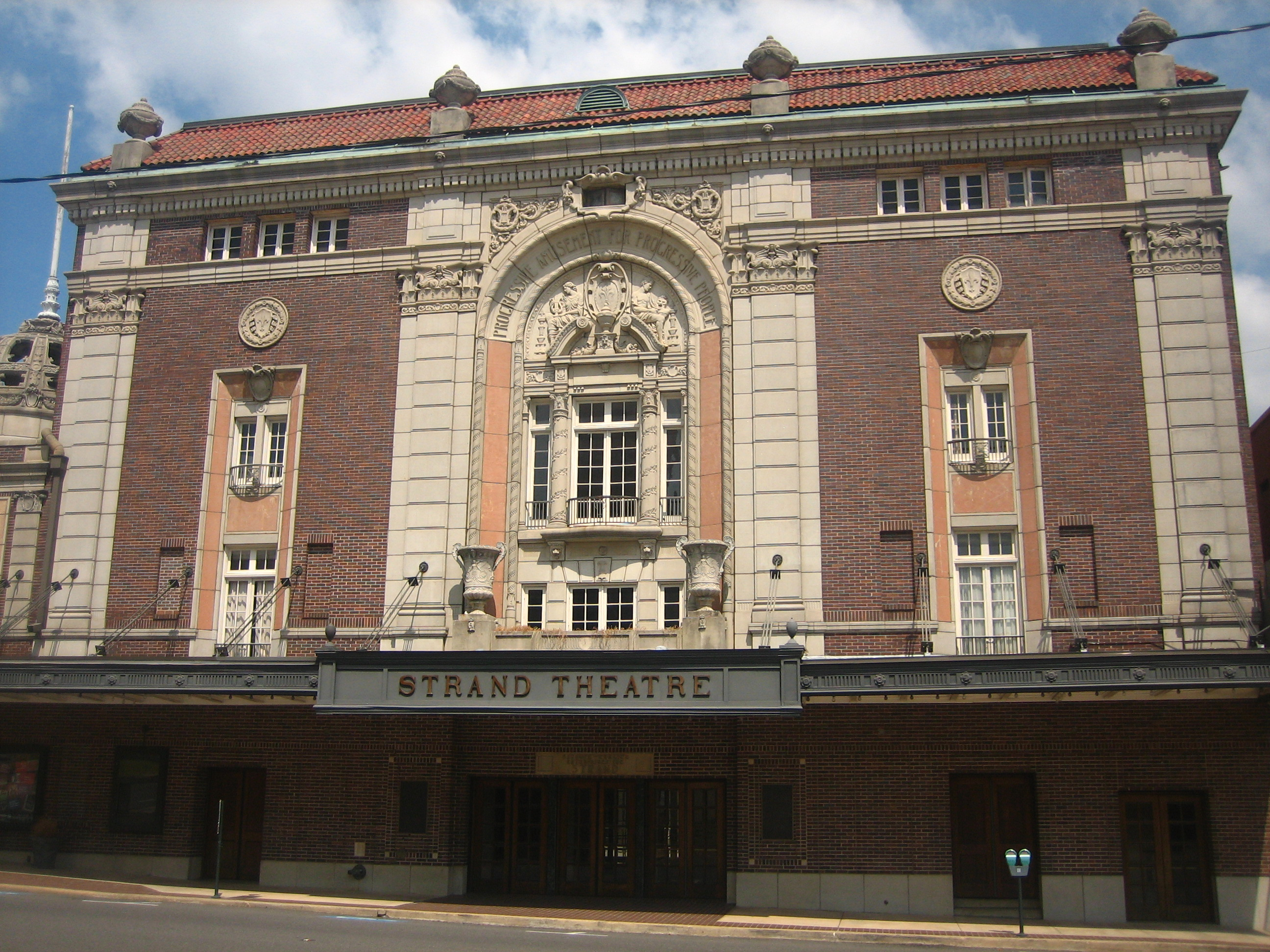
The Strand from the Crockett Street side showing the full size of the building

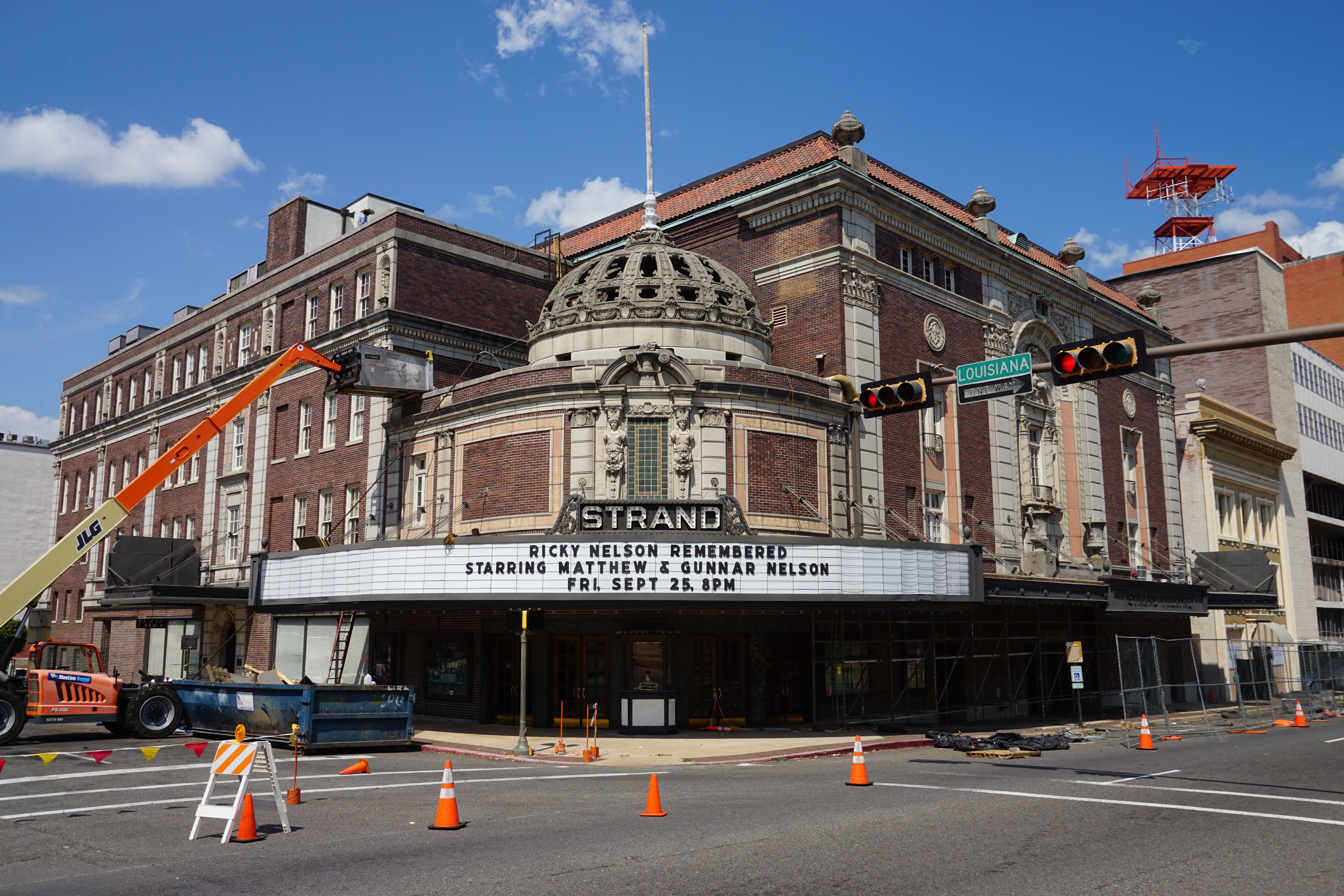
The Strand under renovation in 2015

== See also ==
- National Register of Historic Places listings in Caddo Parish, Louisiana
