= Saenger Theatre (Mobile, Alabama) =

Theater in Mobile, Alabama, United States

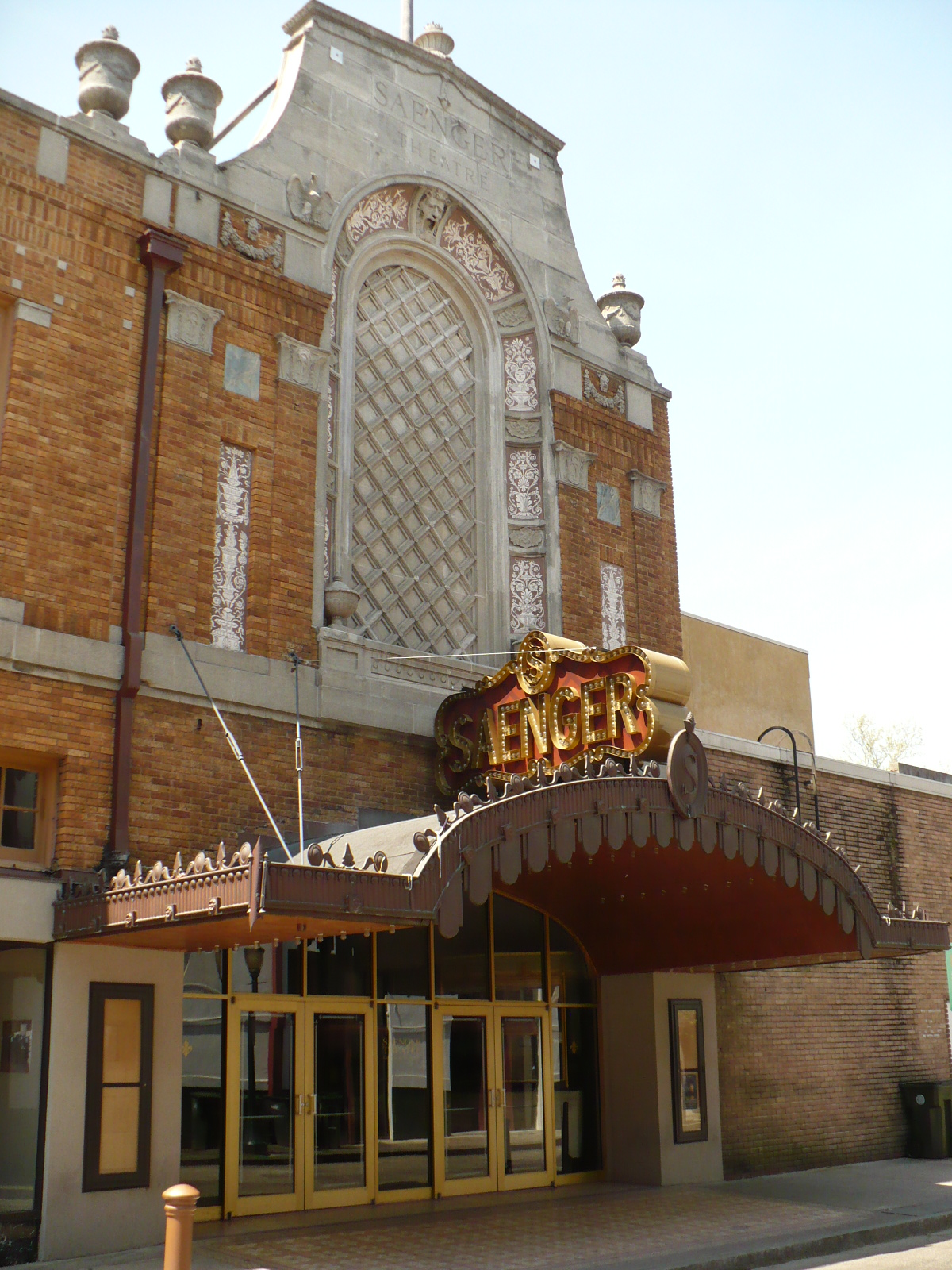
- Entrance of the Saenger Theatre.
- Interactive map of Saenger Theatre
- Address: 6 South Joachim Street; Mobile, Alabama; United States
- Coordinates: 30.690631°N 88.044044°W
- Owner: Center for the Living Arts, Inc.
- Capacity: 1,921
- Type: Indoor Theatre
- Current use: Performing arts center

Construction
- Opened: 19 January 1927
- Architect: Emile Weil

Website
- www.asmglobalmobile.com
- Saenger Theatre
- U.S. Historic district – Contributing property
- Architectural style: 20th Century Revival
- Part of: Lower Dauphin Street Historic District (ID79000392)
- Designated CP: 19 February 1979

The Saenger Theatre is a historic theater and contributing building to the Lower Dauphin Street Historic District in Mobile, Alabama. It was dedicated in January 1927. The Saenger Theatre is a Mobile landmark, known for its architecture and ties to local cultural history. The theater has been completely renovated in recent years with an upgraded electrical system, VIP facilities, new stage rigging and sound system. It is the official home of the Mobile Symphony Orchestra and also serves as the venue for movie festivals, concerts, lectures and special events.

== History ==
When The Saenger opened on January 19, 1927, it was the sixty-first Saenger theatre of a chain founded by the Saenger brothers, Julian and Abe of Shreveport. The Saengers were pharmacists when they purchased their first theater in Shreveport in 1911. They eventually owned 320 theaters located throughout the South, Costa Rica, Cuba, Jamaica, Mexico, Panama and Puerto Rico.

The Saenger Theatre in Mobile took a year to construct at a cost of about 500,000 dollars. Designed by renowned architect, Emile Weil, the Saenger featured three-color auditorium lighting, a two-manual, ten-rank Robert Morton theater organ, full stage facilities to accommodate large road shows including stage and wardrobe traps, four floors of dressing rooms, musicians' and chorus rooms and 2,615 seats. Around 1950, the seats on the floor were replaced and respaced, reducing the seating capacity to about 2,200. Seating capacity today is 1,921.

The Saenger Theatre's decoration was described as, "the motif of a French palace of the Renaissance." It was inspired by classical Greek mythology and Mobile's coastal location. Poseidon is cast above the front entrance and the interior plaster ornamentation includes: Dionysus above the proscenium, Maenads encircling the chandelier in the lounge, Pan beneath the organ grilles and various stylized seahorses, shells and fish throughout the theater. The color scheme of the interior was primarily sea-green with maroon and gold trim. The ceilings featured a variety of trompe-l'œil decoration.

The building was designed in a continental style, intended to resemble European opera houses. The theater's opera boxes that were located beneath the organ grilles were later removed to improve sight-lines when the larger Cinemascope movie screen was installed. Other outstanding architectural features of the original building included: the tilted arcade, grand marble staircase, ornate lamps, chandeliers, statuary and door frames, a mezzanine and promenade. There were lavish furnishings in the men's "Stage Room" and the ladies' "At the Sign of the Lipstick" lounge, which included draperies and carpets with the name of the theater woven into the fabric.

At the dedication ceremonies, then Mayor Harry T. Hartwell and State Senator John Craft were joined by J.L. Bedsole, then President of the Mobile Chamber of Commerce, in addressing the large crowd gathered for the occasion. Mrs. W.G. Ward, a representative of the United Daughters of the Confederacy, presented a portrait of General Robert E. Lee for the theater's foyer, as the dedication date was the General's 119th birthday.

Through the years, the Saenger provided Mobilians with outstanding theatrical entertainment on the live stage and motion picture screen. The Saenger hosted silent movies, vaudeville shows, movies, dramatic and musical productions and was the setting for the first America's Junior Miss pageant. However—as was the case with many of these grand movie palaces—ownership changes, high maintenance costs and various other issues rendered many of these beautiful buildings nationwide, "white elephants". In fact, many were demolished to make way for parking lots and general urban development.

== Restoration ==
In early 1970, owners ABC/Paramount closed the Mobile Saenger and removed the projection equipment and prepared to demolish the site. On the eve of demolition, the University of South Alabama bought the Saenger and saved it from destruction. It was partially renovated and reopened as a performing arts center called the USA Saenger Theatre.

On October 1, 1999, the City of Mobile purchased the Saenger from the University of South Alabama. A new non-profit organization, called the Center for the Living Arts, Inc., was formed early in the year 2000 to operate the Saenger. The Center for the Living Arts, with donations from the community, restored the historic Mobile Saenger at a cost of about six million dollars. Active in the renovation was businessman Massey Palmer Bedsole Jr., and his wife, former State Senator Ann Bedsole of Mobile.

The Saenger Theatre of Mobile now functions as downtown Mobile's premiere live music concert venue and performing arts center and is the official home of the Mobile Symphony Orchestra. The Saenger features the annual "Summer Movie Series" and presents numerous concerts, lectures and special events.

Oak View Group oversees operations of the historic Saenger Theatre on behalf of the City of Mobile.

== See also ==
- Saenger Theatre – some that survive
