= Temple Theater (Meridian, Mississippi) =

- U.S. National Register of Historic Places
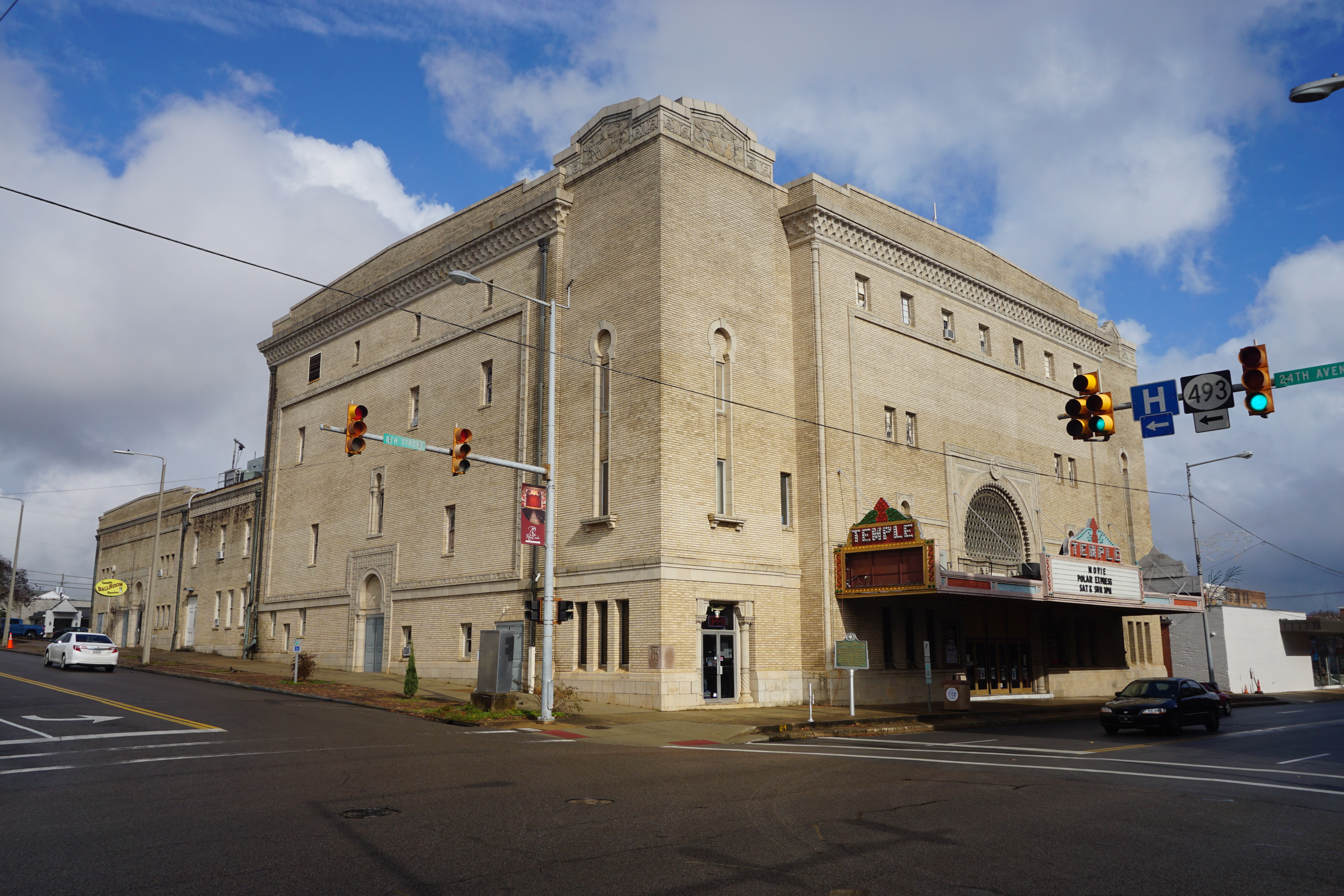

- Location within Mississippi Location within the United States
- Location: Meridian, Mississippi
- Coordinates: 32°21′55″N 88°42′7.67″W
- Built: 1924
- Architect: Emile Weil
- Architectural style: Late 19th And 20th Century Revivals
- MPS: Meridian MRA
- NRHP reference No.: 79003407
- Added to NRHP: December 18, 1979

The Hamasa Shrine Temple Theater, added to the National Register of Historic Places in 1979, is a historic theater located at 2320 8th Street in Meridian, Mississippi. The Temple Theater was constructed in the Moorish Revival style and began screening silent films in 1928. The theater features a Byzantine motif, a swirl of marble fountains, and large bronze chandeliers. At the time of its construction, the theater contained one of the largest stages in the United States, second only to the Roxy Theater in New York City. The theater houses one of only two Robert Morton theatre organs still installed in their original locations in the State of Mississippi – the other being installed at the Saenger Theater in Hattiesburg, Mississippi. Both organs are under the care and restoration efforts of the Magnolia Chapter of the American Theatre Organ Society (ATOS).

The Temple, originally used for vaudeville and movies, is now used year-round for area events, live stage shows, plays, and concerts.

== History ==
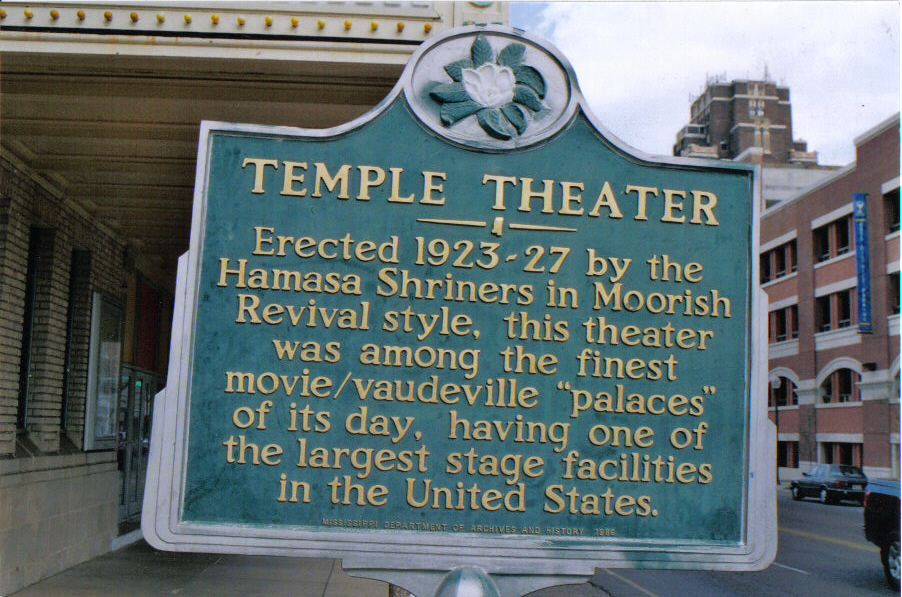
Historic sign in front of theater

The Hamasa Shrine organization in Meridian had outgrown their building across town by the early 1920s and sought to relocate. The Shriners hired architect Emile Weil to design the building and construction began in 1923. After the Grand Ballroom was completed in 1924, the Shriners moved in and began holding meetings while the rest of the building was being built around them. The theater part of the building was completed a few months later, but for the first few months of operation only occasional travelling shows performed at the Temple. It wasn't until 1927 when the Shriners leased the Temple Theater to the Saenger corporation in New Orleans that the Temple was modified into a movie house that the venue became very popular.

After several modifications – including the addition of a 3 manual 8 rank Robert Morton theatre organ – the Temple Theater was finally completed in 1928. At the time of its construction, the theater contained one of the largest stages in the United States, second only to the Roxy Theater in New York City. Saenger's lease was renewed in 1952 for an additional 20 years, ending in 1972. With seating for 1800 persons, the silent movie era was a prosperous time for the Temple. Even after the silent movie era ended, the Temple provided entertainment to guests. Some of the artists that have performed at the Temple include George Strait, Alabama, Ronnie Milsap, Bill Monroe, Willie Nelson, The Oak Ridge Boys, Randy Travis, Roy Clark, Waylon Jennings, Elvis Presley, and many other big names.

In 1973, after the Saenger's lease had expired, the Hamasa Shrine began restoration efforts ranging from repairing plaster damage and repainting walls to reupholstering seats and replacing carpets. The Temple remained true to its original design with one exception: the lobby's terrazzo floor, inlaid with small brass stars, swastikas, and crescents, was edited during World War II. The swastikas, simply design elements when the theater was constructed, were removed.

In February 2009, a businessman from Dallas, Texas, named Roger Smith bought the Temple and promised to restore the Temple and continue year-round programming. Though many movie houses across the nation have been demolished, the Temple has remained in constant use. Today the Temple is used year-round for area events, live stage shows, plays, concerts. Hamasa Shrine is no longer is affiliated with the Temple Theater as they sold the building to Roger Smith and constructed a new Temple in Marion, Mississippi also located in Lauderdale County around 2010.

== Acoustics ==
The design of the auditorium embodies curved and unbroken surfaces to insure quality acoustics, and a resonance chamber was built as a floor to the orchestra pit, increasing and enriching the tone of the instruments. In spite of the size of the room and relatively large number of the audience, some shows, such as both of Tony Bennett's appearances at the theatre, are able to be performed entirely without microphones.

The theater contains a Robert Morton theatre organ – one of only two of the same type still installed in its original location in the state. A white and gold console provides three 61 note manuals and 32 pedals to play 608 pipes arranged in eight ranks. The pipes are contained in two chambers – one located either side of the stage. Each chamber contains four ranks of pipes and various percussion instruments ranging from bass and snare drums to xylophone, orchestral bells, and 12 special effects, known collectively as the "toy counter". These are special sound effects such as train whistle, car horn, and duck calls, which were meant to accompany silent films. This Robert Morton Console provides 120 stops to select the various voices and blends available, with 48 "pistons" allowing a pre-defined selection of stops to be instantly recalled. The organ sustained damage during rain leakage, but is now fully restored due to the efforts of the Magnolia Chapter of the American Theatre Organ Society.
