= Jefferson Theatre =

- Jefferson Theater
- U.S. National Register of Historic Places
- U.S. Historic district – Contributing property
- Recorded Texas Historic Landmark
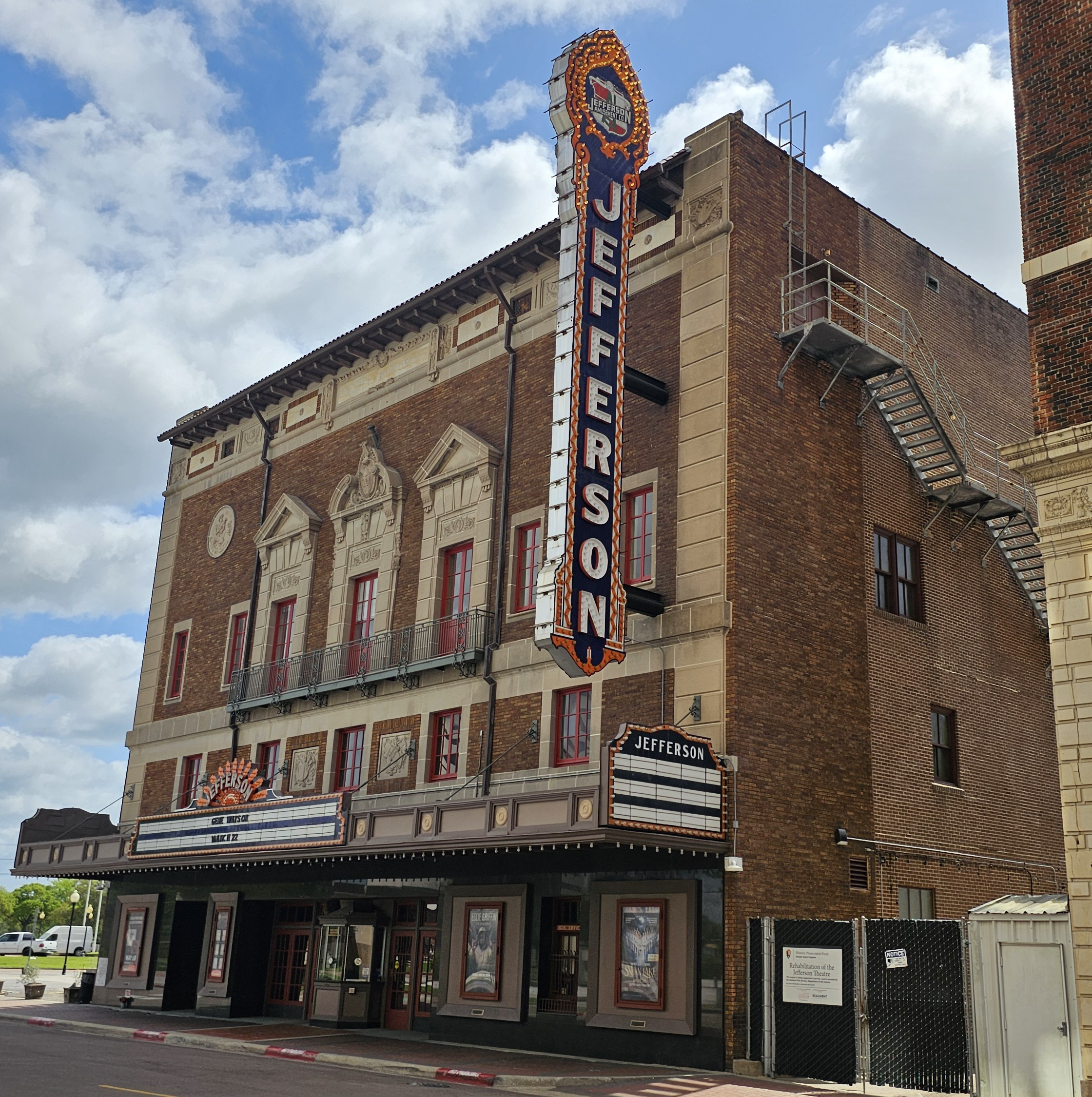
- The theater in 2024

- Location within Texas Location within the United States
- Location: 345 Fannin St., Beaumont, Texas
- Coordinates: 30°4′54″N 94°5′52″W
- Area: 0.5 acres (0.20 ha)
- Built: 1927
- Architect: Emile Weil, Inc.
- Website: Jefferson Theatre
- Part of: Beaumont Commercial District (ID78002959)
- NRHP reference No.: 78002962
- RTHL No.: 10537

Significant dates
- Added to NRHP: January 30, 1978
- Designated CP: April 14, 1978
- Designated RTHL: 1978

The Jefferson Theatre is a historic performing arts theatre on Fannin Street in downtown Beaumont, Texas. Designed by Emile Weil and built in 1927, it is an example of Old Spanish architecture and seats over 1400. The Jefferson Amusement Company built the theatre, which Saenger Amusements owned. The theatre is featured on the National Register of Historic Places and recognized as a Recorded Texas Historic Landmark. The theatre recently underwent a comprehensive multimillion-dollar renovation. It is also one of the few theatres in the country containing its original Morton organ, produced by the Robert Morton Organ Company.

== History ==
Designed by the renowned architect Emile Weil, the Jefferson Theatre opened on November 14, 1927, at a cost of nearly $1 million. The theater, originally designed for the Jefferson Amusement Company, boasts a 3-manual, 8-rank Robert Morton organ. A five-day premiere of the recently released "It's A Wonderful Life" (1946) was held at the Jefferson Theatre from March 4-8, 1947, with star James Stewart and director Frank Capra in attendance on March 4, 1947. The theatre closed in 1972 due to a loss of interest in downtown.

By 1997, the theatre was operational again, but was closed in September 2000 for a complete restoration and renovation. The 6.5 million dollar restoration was completed in 2003. As of 2010, the City of Beaumont operates the theatre while the Jefferson Theatre Preservation Society oversees the preservation, promotion, and use of the theatre.

== Performances ==
Since the renovation, several high-profile artists have performed at the theatre, including Joan Rivers, The Temptations, Lou Rawls, George Carlin, the Doobie Brothers, and Lyle Lovett. The theatre also hosts various local acts and events and is home to an annual film festival.

== Hurricane Rita ==
In September 2005, the Vince Vaughn Wild West Comedy Show performance was canceled due to Hurricane Rita (which damaged the theatre and prompted a temporary closure for maintenance and repairs). The theatre reopened for business in December 2005.

== Photo gallery ==
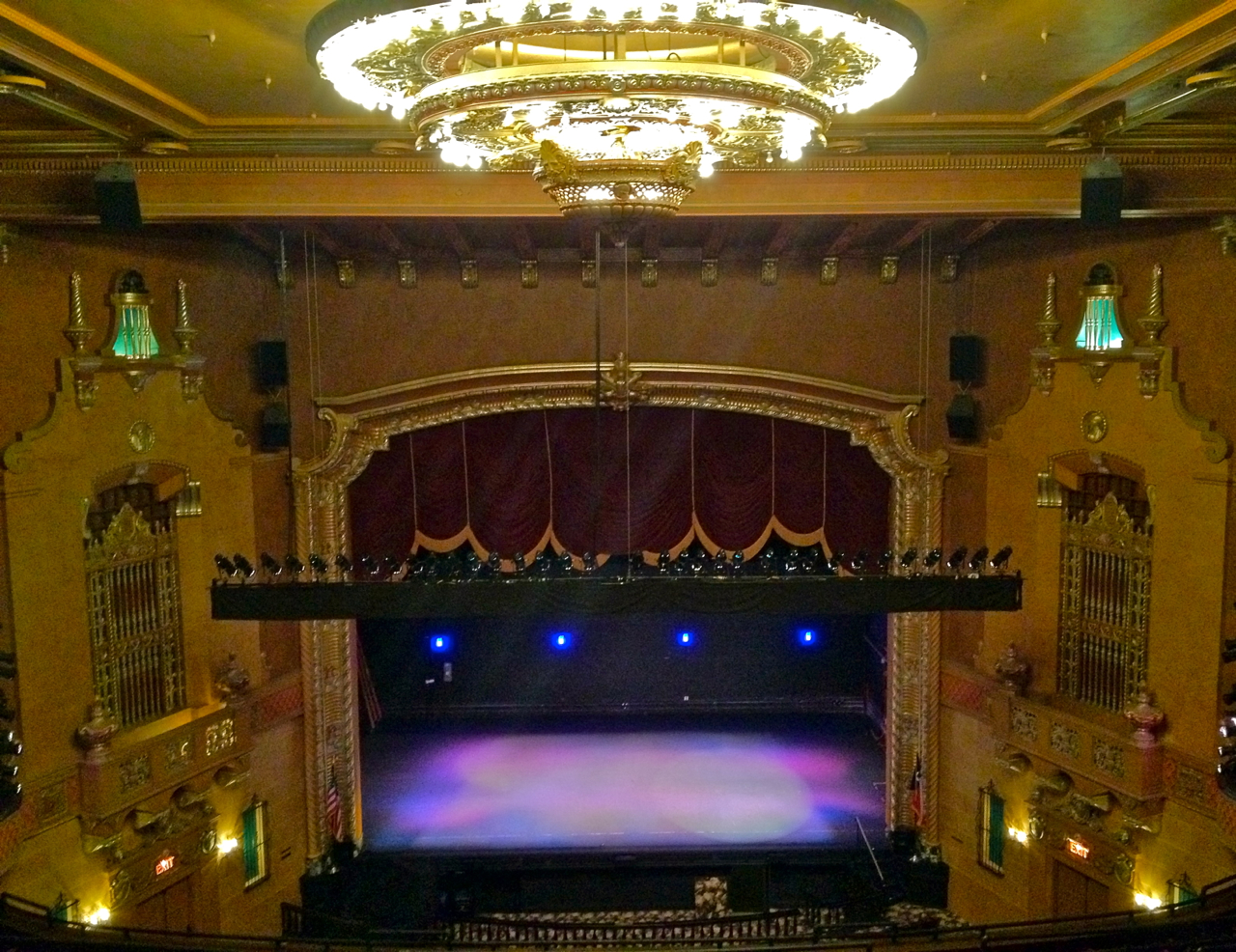
The auditorium.

Seating

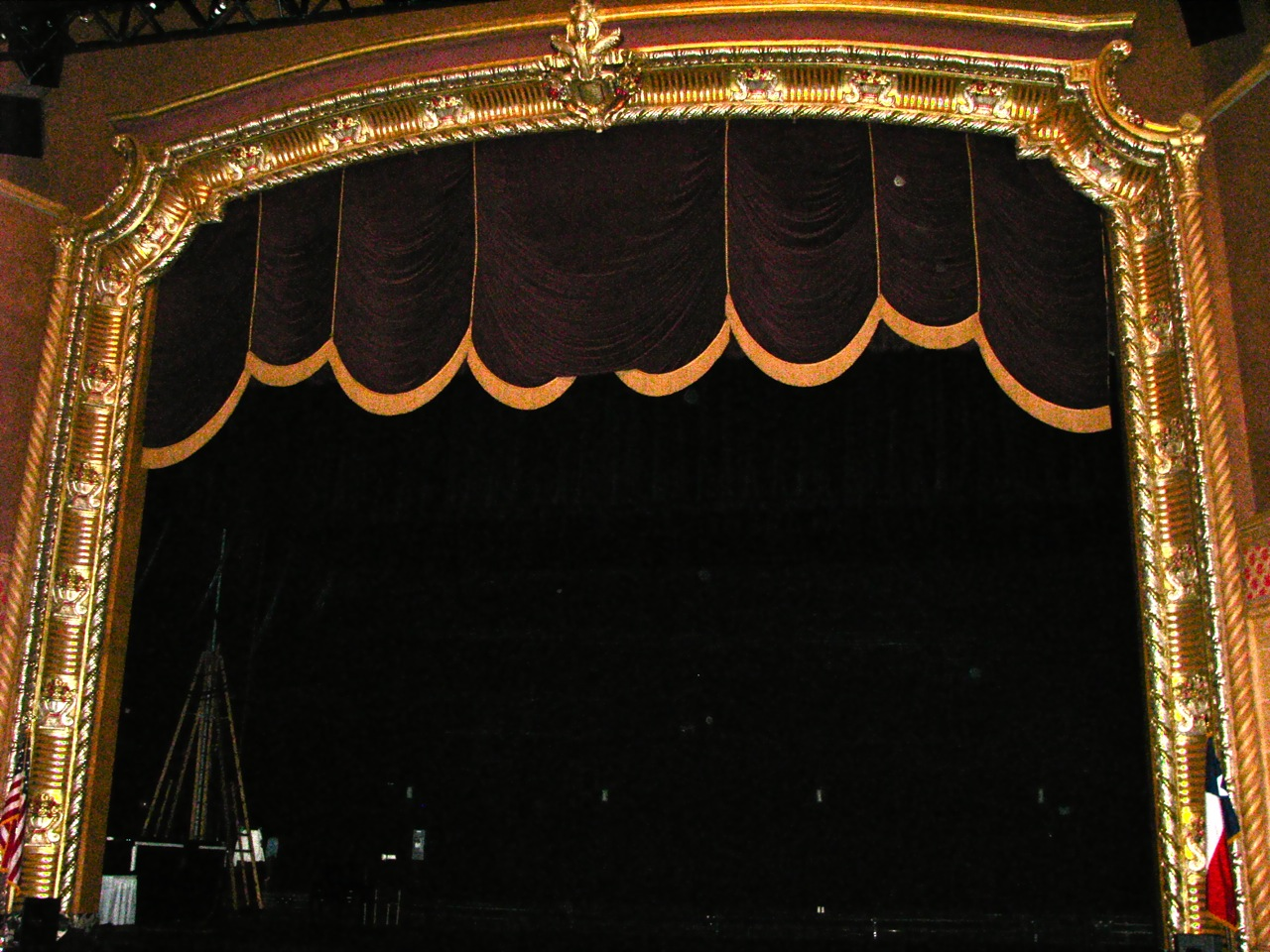
Proscenium arch.

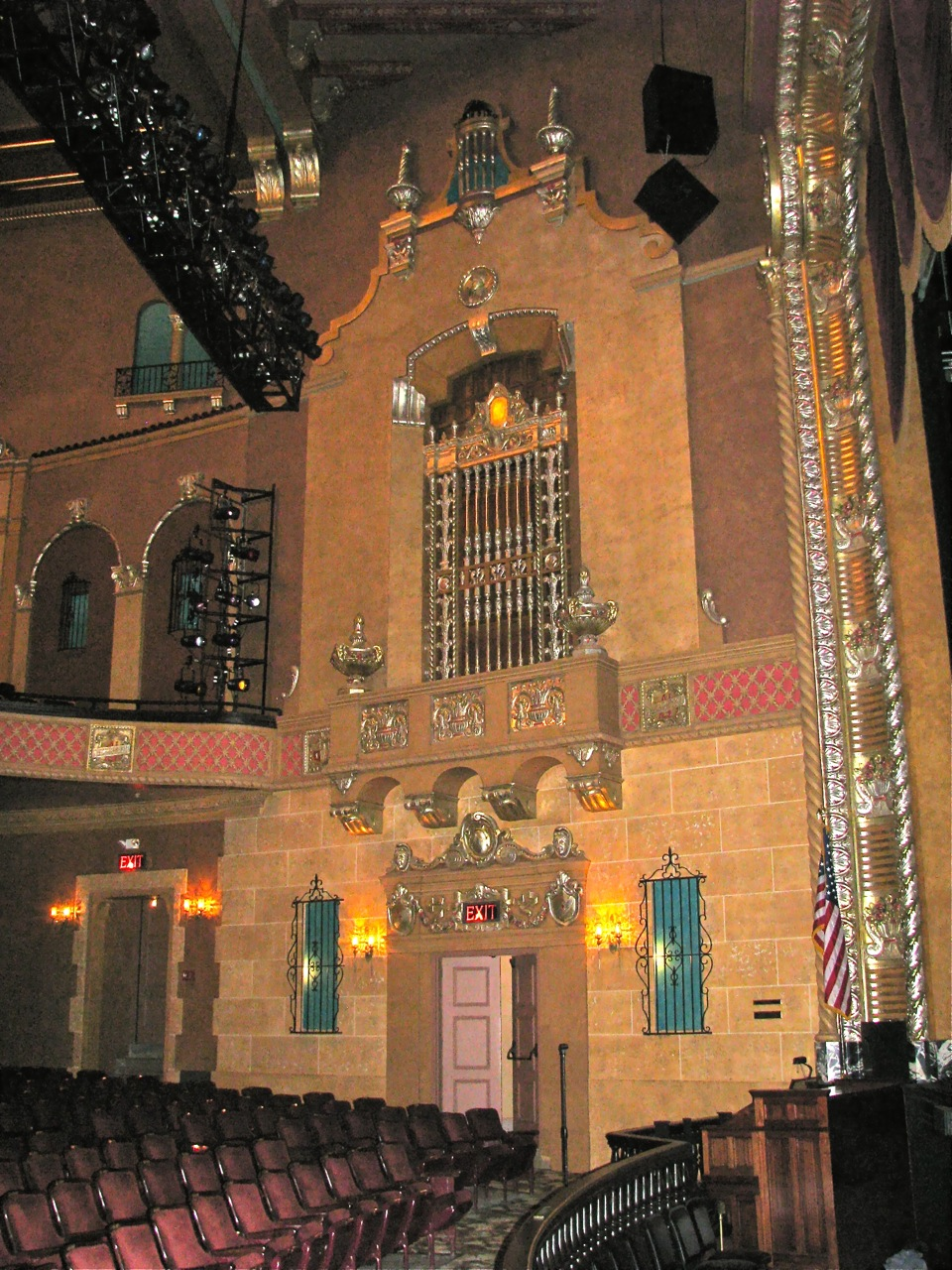
The detail from the stage.

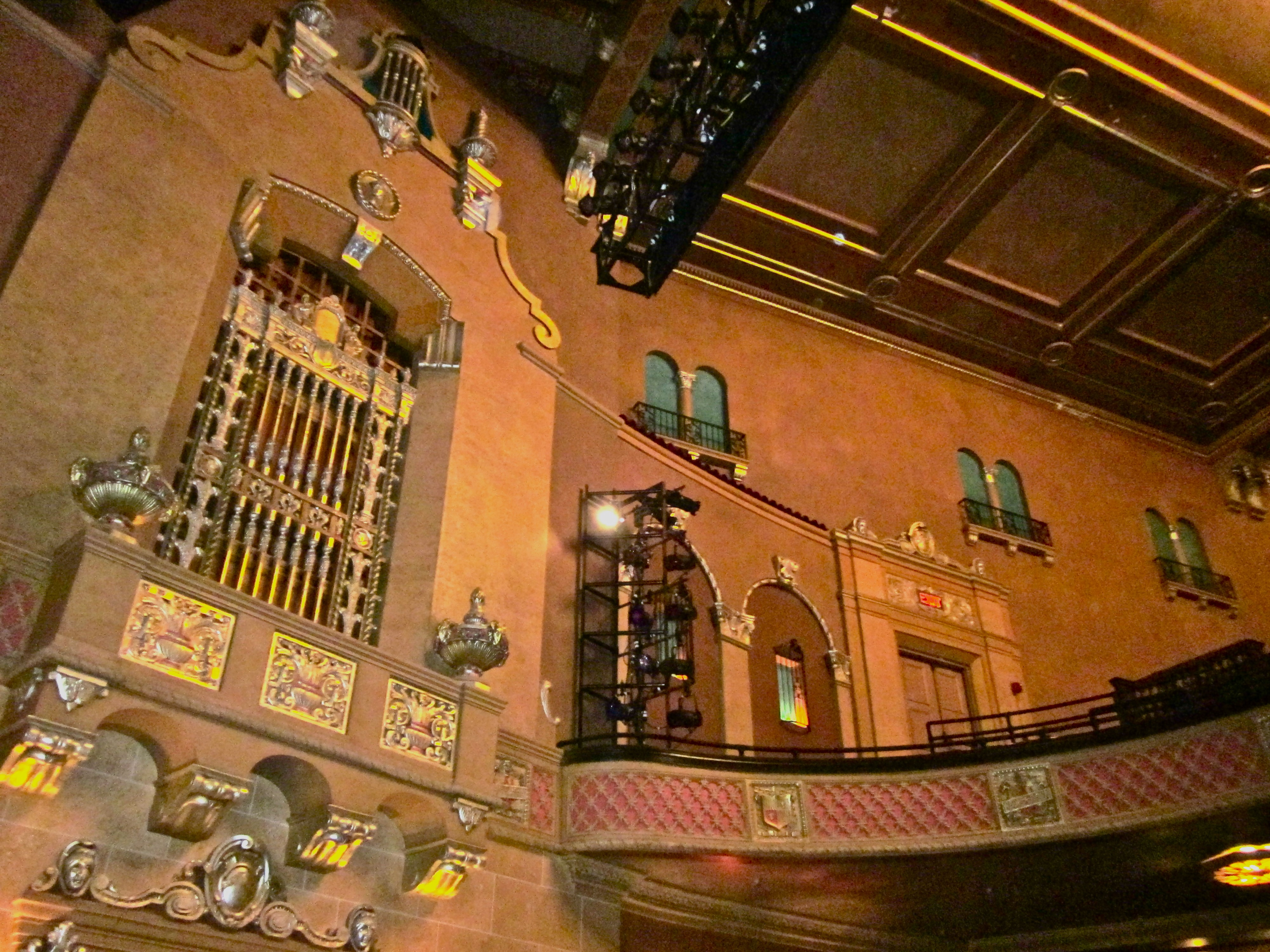
Looking up.

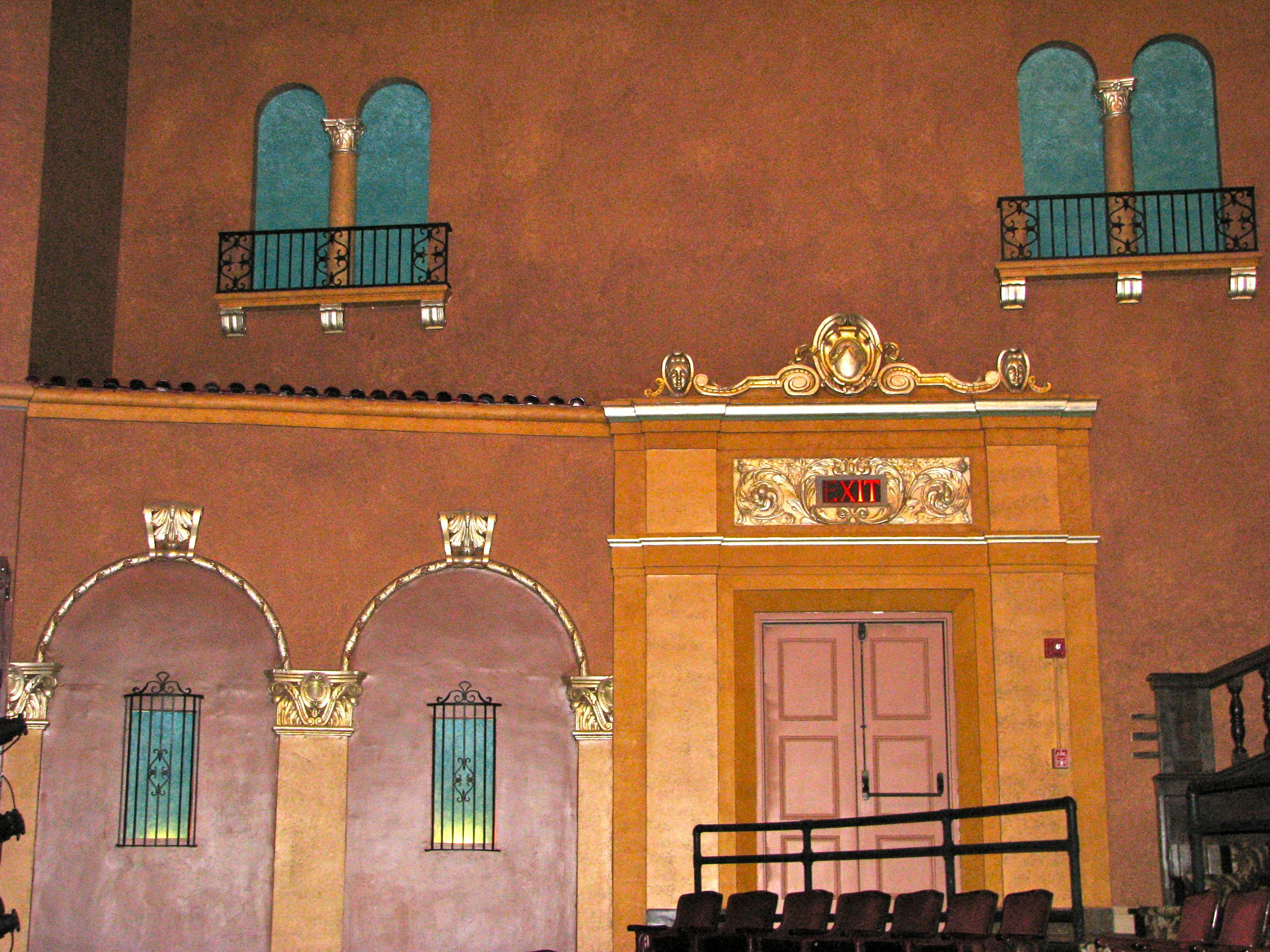
Mezzanine decoration detail.

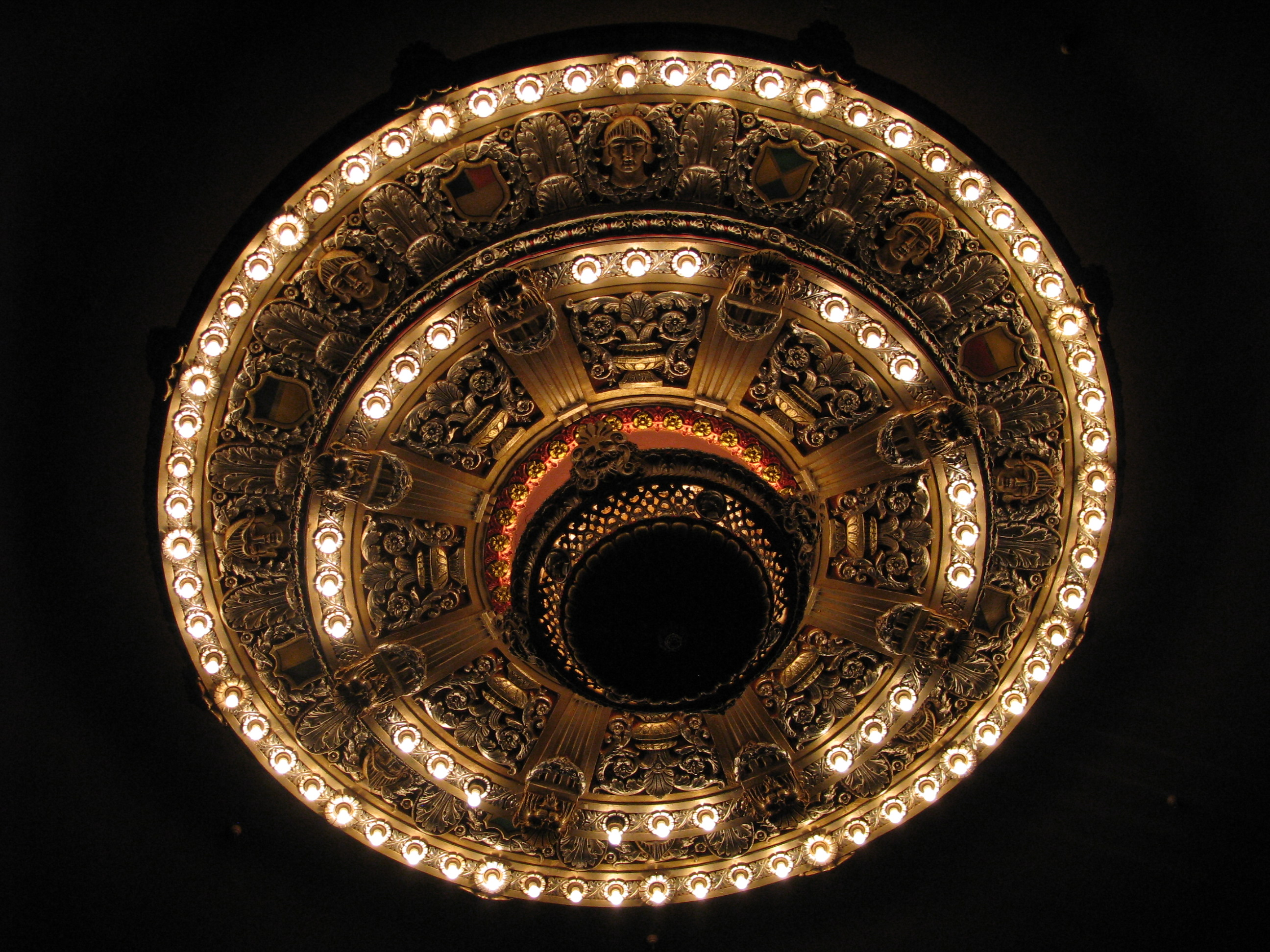
The Grand Chandelier

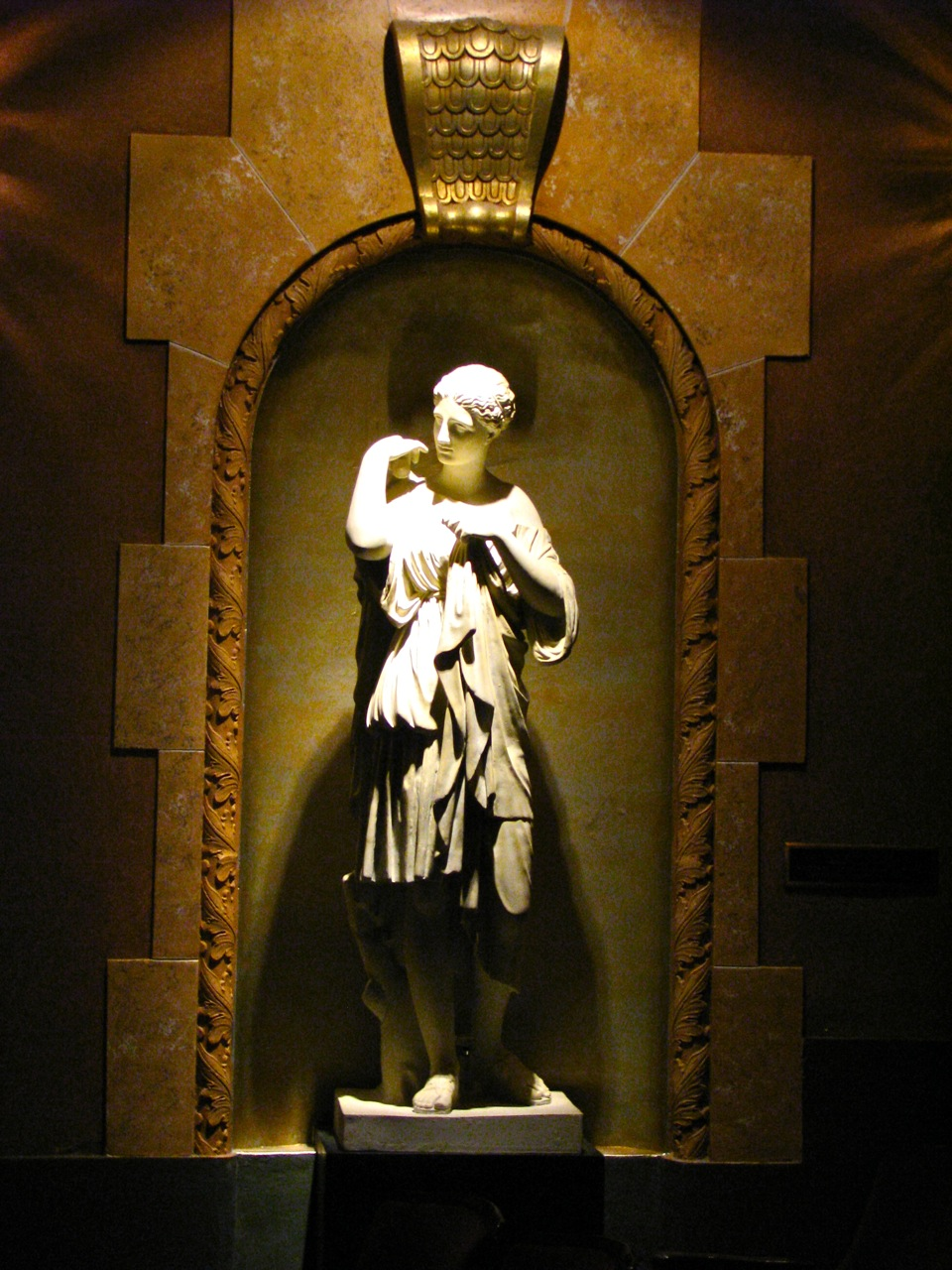
Auditorium Statuary

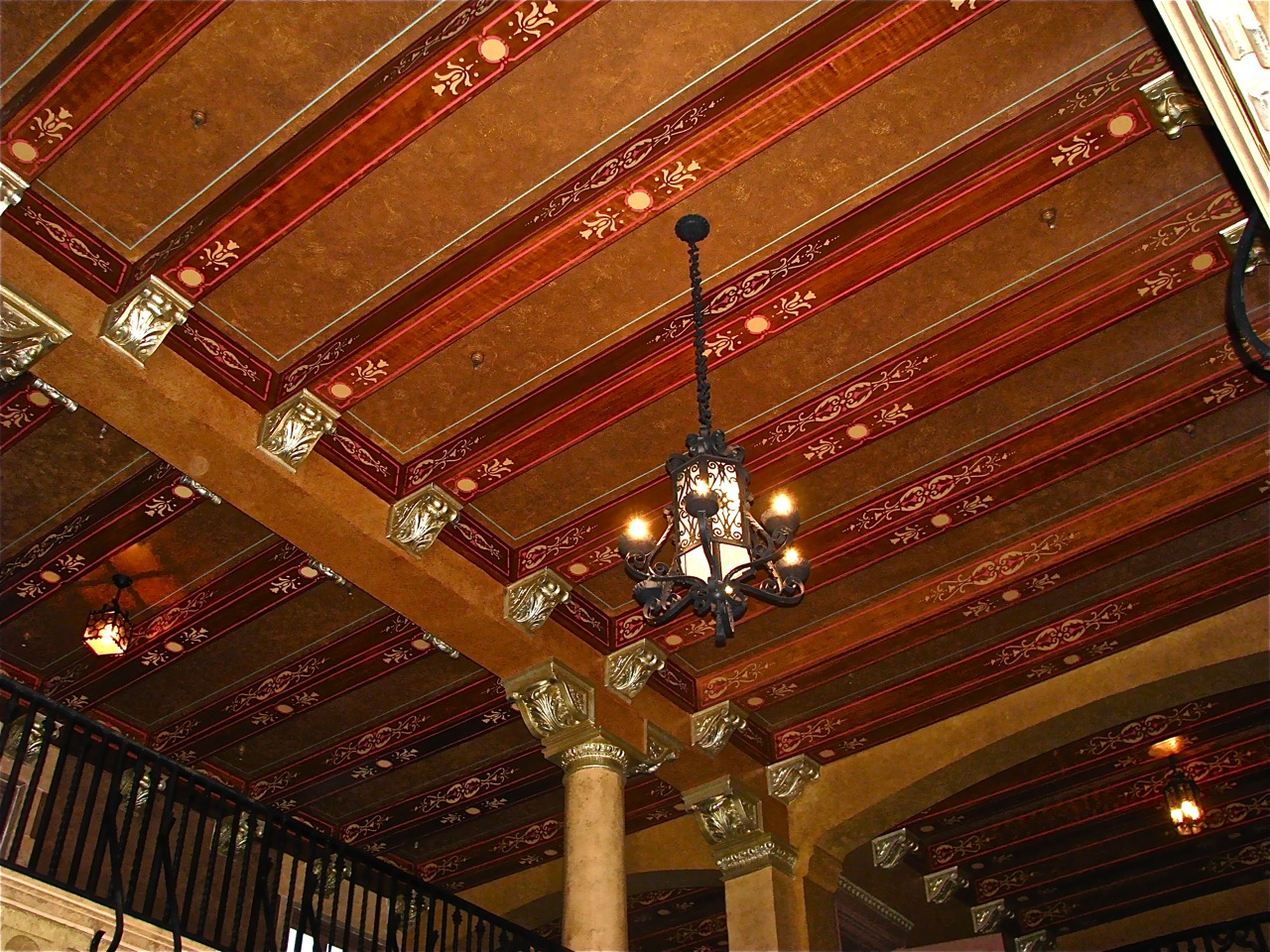
The lobby ceiling.

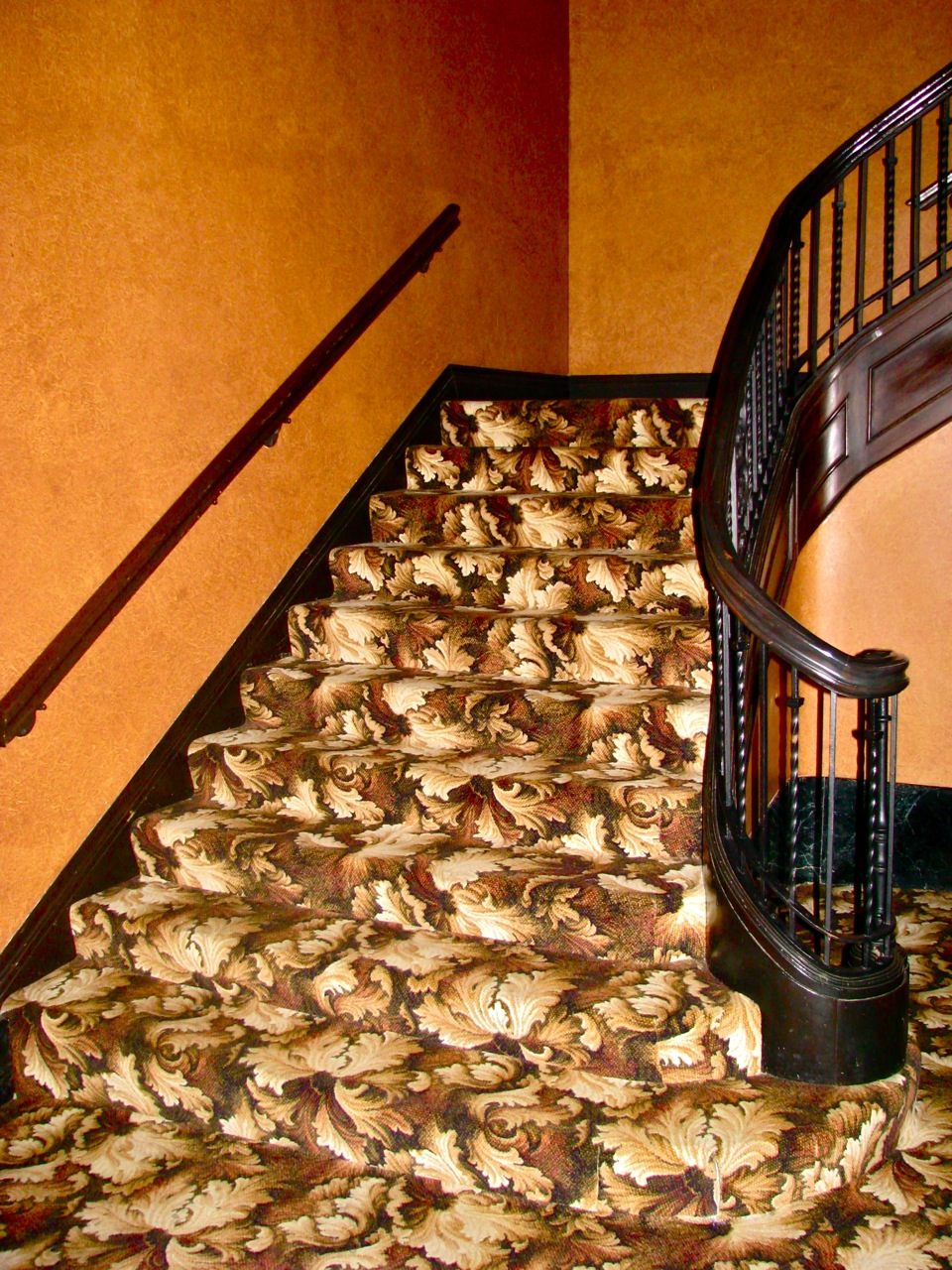
Grand Staircase

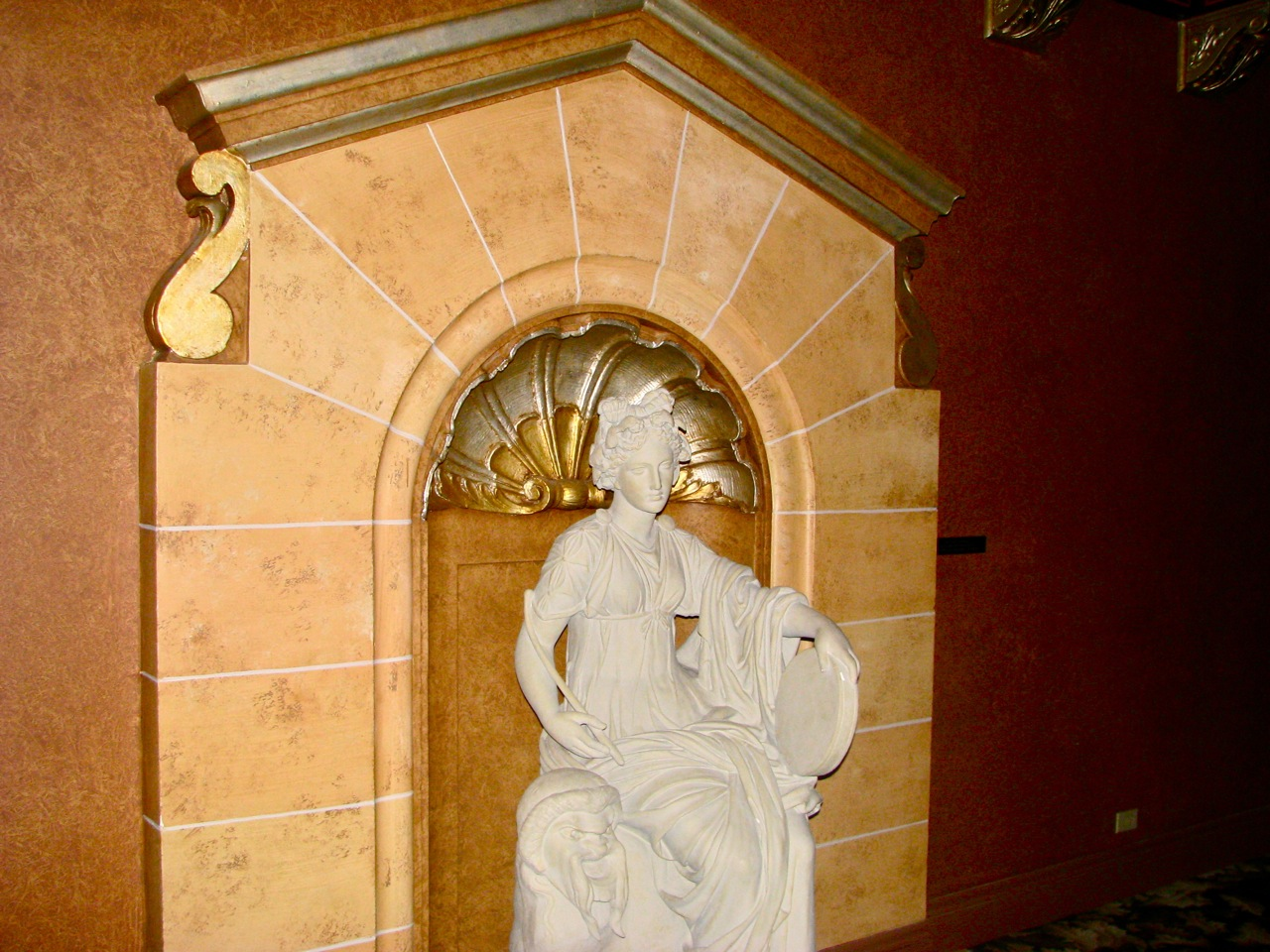
Lobby Statuary

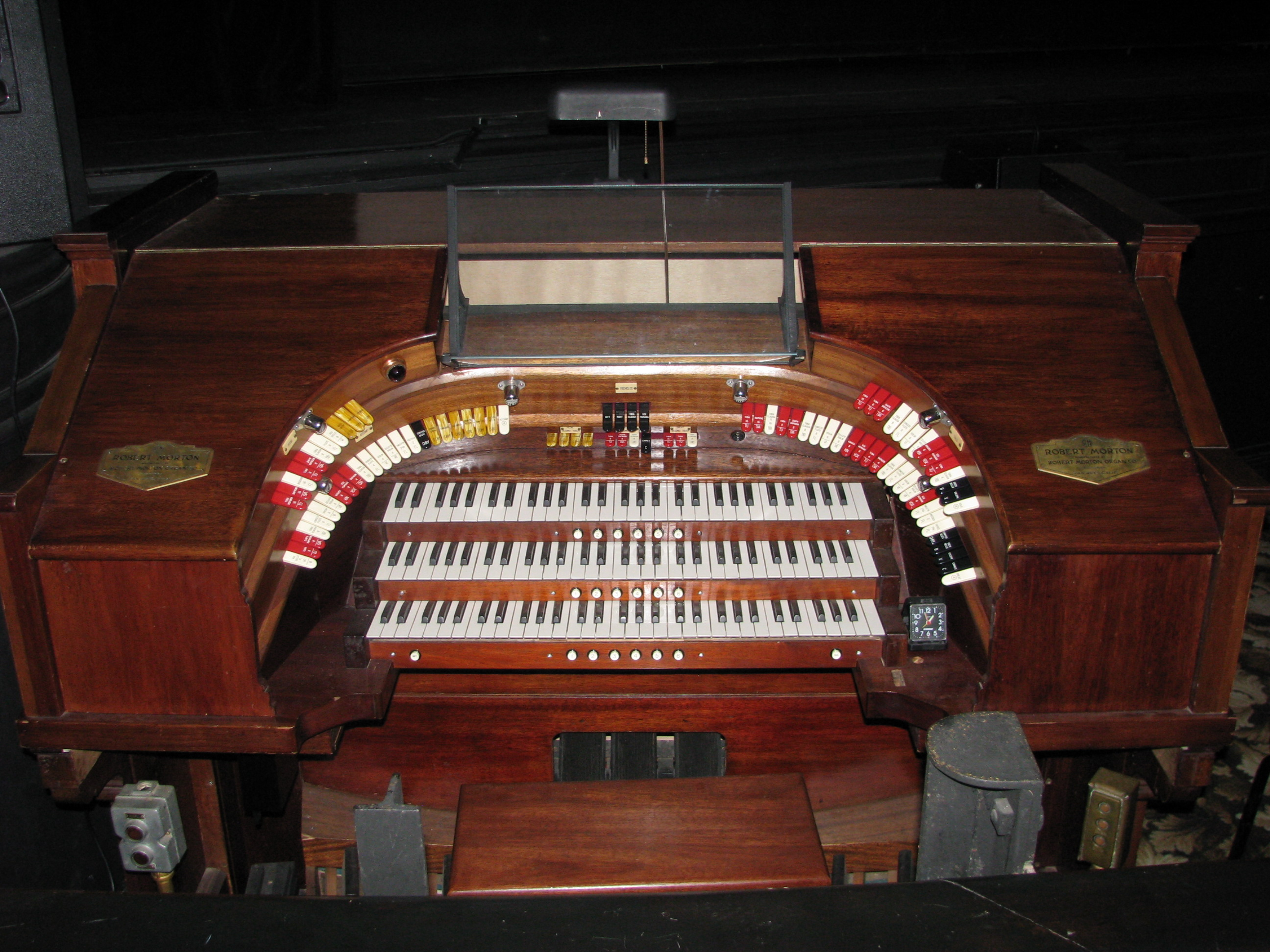
Robert Morton Organ

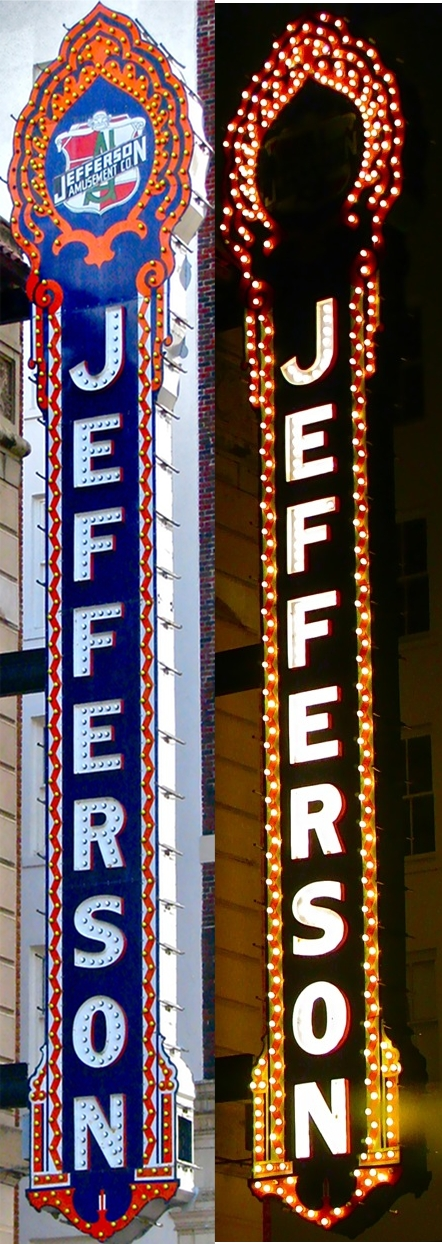
Jefferson

== See also ==
- National Register of Historic Places listings in Jefferson County, Texas
- Recorded Texas Historic Landmarks in Jefferson County
- Julie Rogers Theater, Beaumont, Texas
