= Saenger Theatre (Pine Bluff, Arkansas) =

Building in Pine Bluff, Arkansas, United States

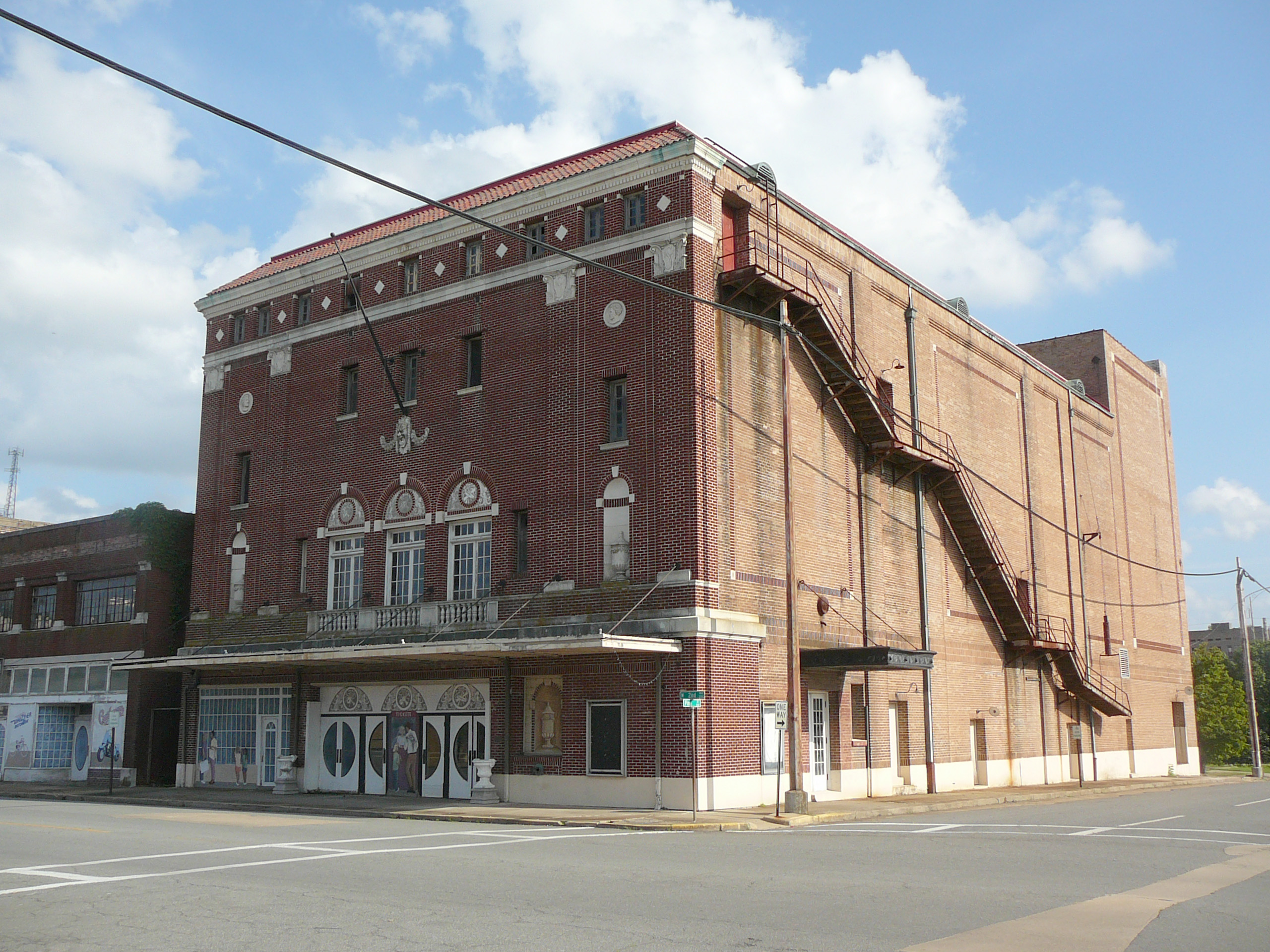
- View from South Pine Street in 2014
- Interactive map of the Saenger Theatre area

General information
- Type: Theater
- Architectural style: Classical Revival
- Location: 120 W. 2nd Ave., Pine Bluff, Arkansas, United States
- Coordinates: 34°13′41.90″N 92°0′15.29″W
- Completed: 1924 (102 years ago)

Technical details
- Material: Brick
- Floor count: 4

Design and construction
- Architect: Emile Weil
- Saenger Theatre
- U.S. National Register of Historic Places
- NRHP reference No.: 95000348
- Added to NRHP: March 23, 1995

The Saenger Theatre is a historic theatre building at 120 West 2nd Avenue in Pine Bluff, Arkansas. Built in 1924 to a design by Emile Weil, it is a Classical Revival brick building with an ornate interior that was last restyled in 1937. It is one of only a handful of Saenger movie palaces that remain.

The building was listed on the National Register of Historic Places in 1995.

== See also ==
- Saenger Theatre – some that survive
