= Palace Theater (Hilo, Hawaii) =

Historic Theater in Hawaii County, Hawaii

Coordinates: 19.724423°N 155.0865°W

- U.S. National Register of Historic Places
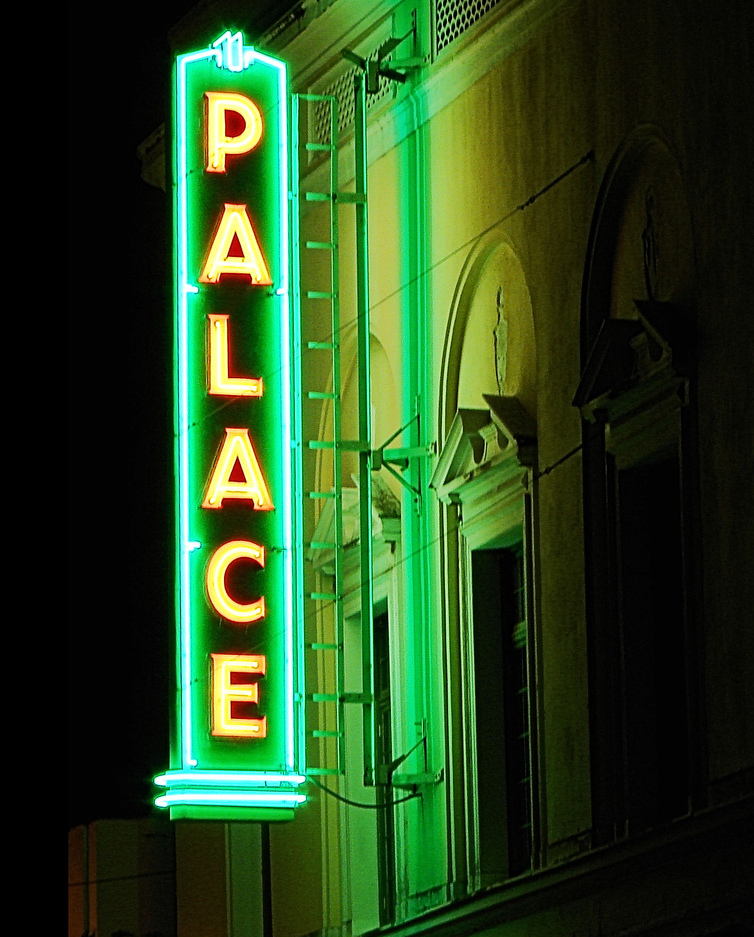
- The theater's neon sign
- Location: 38 Haili St., Hilo, Hawaii
- Built: 1925
- Architect: Davis & Fishbourne
- Website: https://hilopalace.com/
- NRHP reference No.: 93000376
- Added to NRHP: May 11, 1993

The Palace Theater is a historic movie theater in downtown Hilo, Hawaiʻi. Built in 1925, the Beaux-Arts–style building was added to the National Register of Historic Places on May 11, 1993. After closing as a commercial cinema, the theatre reopened in 1998 as an arthouse venue and performance space, hosting films, concerts, and live theatrical productions.

== Architecture ==
Architects Davis & Fishbourne designed the building in the Beaux-Arts style, and it was constructed in 1925.

The two-story building has five bays on its front facade, with a metal marquee dividing the two stories. The three central bays feature broken pediments and decorative urns above the second-floor windows. A parapet with a balustrade runs along the top of the building.

The theatre includes a restored lobby with a cafe. The theatre itself features steeply banked amphitheater seating in three tiers, and a decorative proscenium frames the stage.

A large Robert Morton pipe organ is in the auditorium. Much of the organ is original to the Palace in 1925. The organ was moved in 1940 to the Hilo Theater, which was destroyed by the 1960 tsunami. The surviving pipework was then purchased by Roger Angell and installed in his family home in Honolulu. He eventually donated the organ back to the Palace Theater, and it has been expanded with portions of the pipe organ from the demolished Waikiki Theatre in Honolulu.

== Events ==
The Palace Theater has regular concerts. Every spring, a variety show fundraiser is held featuring local talent. Each autumn, a theatrical musical production is staged for performances over the course of a month. Independent films are played throughout the year.

During the COVID-19 pandemic, the Palace Theater produced the Live From the Empty Palace web series, which featured local Hawaiian artists performing for an empty audience. The series produced a Nā Hōkū Hanohano finalist compilation album, and a 12-episode broadcast television series shown on PBS. The series included performances by Hawaiian artists including Kolea, El Sancho, Larry Dupio, Kainani Kahaunaele, Lopaka Rootz, Ka'ahele.

== See also ==
- Hawaii International Film Festival
