= Waikīkī (2020 film) =

2020 film

- Original title: Waikīkī
- Directed by: Christopher Kahunahana
- Screenplay by: Christopher Kahunahana
- Produced by: Gregory Doi et al.
- Starring: Danielle Zalopany; Peter Shinkoda; Jason Quinn; Kealohi Kalahiki; Nahinu Kalahiki; Claire Johnson; Kimo Kahoano
- Cinematography: Ryan Miyamoto
- Edited by: Robert Bates et al.
- Music by: Woody Pak
- Release date: 2020
- Country: United States
- Language: English

Waikīkī is a 2020 film by Hawaiian director Christopher Kahunahana.

== Plot ==
Kea is first introduced in a short scene as a dancer performing the hula to the well-known romantic song “Waikīkī” (1938) by Andy Cummings. She is then shown as a bar hostess who is verbally abused and mistreated by her partner Branden because of this job. She flees into the night in her van and hits Wo, a homeless man who is crossing the street. He becomes her silent companion for the next few days as she unsuccessfully tries to find a new apartment and eventually loses the van.

The day after the mysterious Wo enters her life, Kea is late for school, where she teaches Hawaiian. She explains to the class the Hawaiian proverb “He aliʻi ka ʻāina; he kauwā ke kanaka” (The land is the Aliʻi, man is its servant) and its deeper meaning that humans are dependent on the life-giving land.

The plot is interrupted several times by shots of mountains, waterfalls, and waterways on the one hand, and flashbacks showing Kea as a child with her grandmother on the other. She teaches her the children's song “Ke Ao Nani” (this wonderful world) by Mary Kawena Pukui and how it is danced as Hula noho (seated hula). Also when Kea, living as a homeless person, desperately wonders “if everything will turn out okay,” her grandmother appears to her. Further flashbacks interrupting the plot, in which she is seen as a child with Uncle Bully, hint at abuse and violence.

Finally, Kea kneels on the ground in a park on Sand Island, looking out over Honolulu Harbor toward the Kakaʻako skyline, and dances and sings the entire song “Ke Ao Nani” as a hula noho. The end of the song “He inoa no nā kamaliʻi” (in honor of the children) leads into the final flashback, which shows Kea as a child with her grandmother. At the end, she is seen again, as in the first scene, dancing hula on a small stage to “Waikīkī,” while in the background, Lēʻahi, located southeast of Waikīkī, can be seen through a large window.

During the credits, the protest song “Look what they've done” plays, among others, with clear criticism of touristy Waikīkī.

== Cast ==
- Danielle Zalopany as Kea
- Peter Shinkoda as Wo
- Jason Quinn as Branden
- Kealohi Kalahiki as Little Kea
- Nahinu Kalahiki as Littlest Kea
- Claire Johnson as Gramma
- Kimo Kahoano as Uncle Bully

== Reception ==
In a detailed review, Jeff Chang describes the film's origins and discusses its numerous references to the culture of the Kanaka Maoli.

The German premiere took place on August 7, 2025, at the Babylon cinema in the presence of Danielle Zalopany and Christopher Kahunahana as part of the opening of the Aloha Hawaiʻi film festival.

== Accolades ==
- Los Angeles Asian Pacific Film Festival: Grand Jury Award for Best North American Narrative Feature
- Hawaii Film Critics Society (HFCS) Winner 2020: Best Hawaii Film
