= Saenger Theatre (Pensacola, Florida) =

Historic performing arts theater in Pensacola, Florida

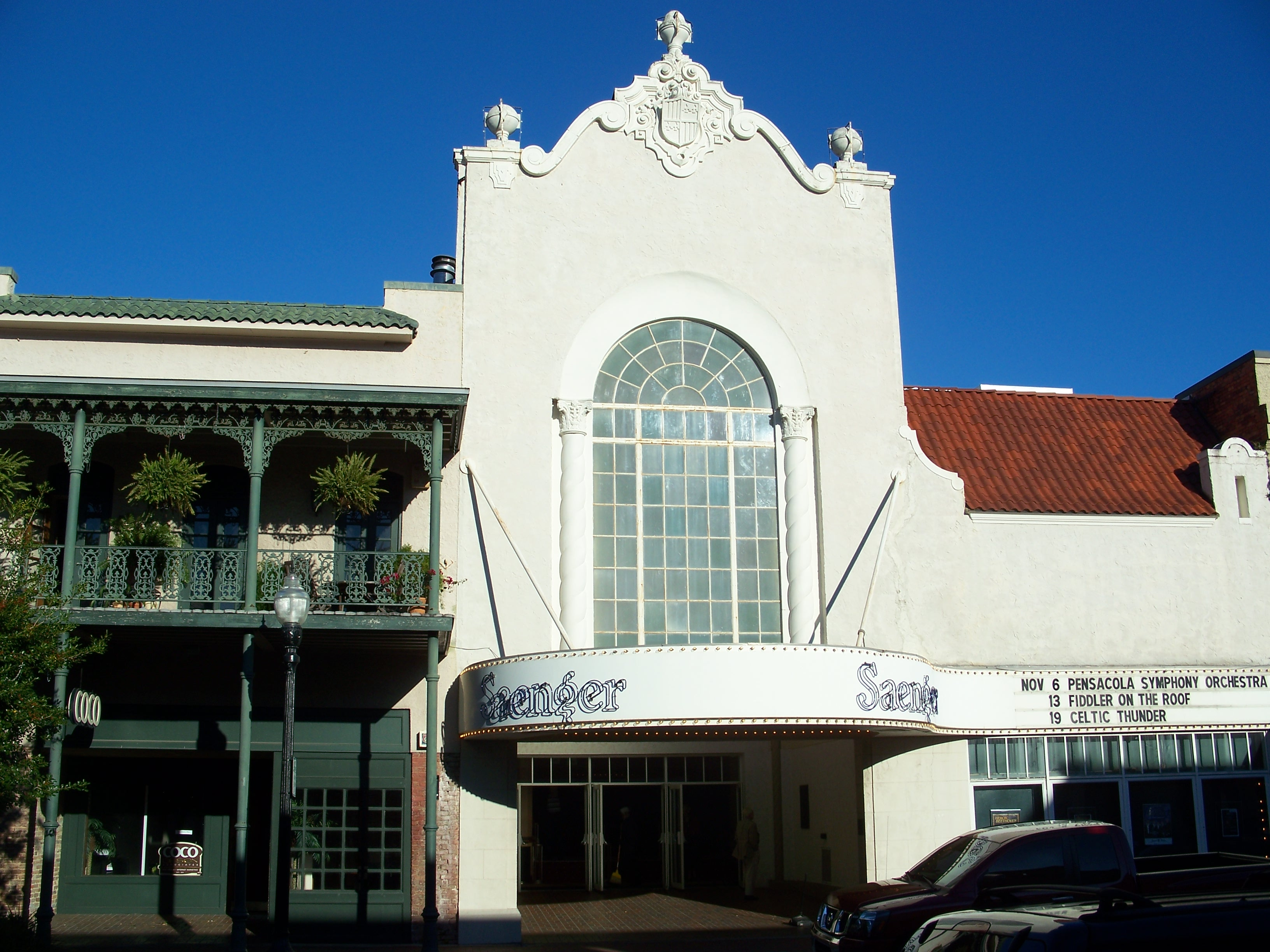
- The Saenger Theatre in downtown Pensacola
- Interactive map of Saenger Theatre
- Address: 118 South Palafox Place; Pensacola, Florida; United States
- Owner: City of Pensacola
- Operator: Legends Global
- Capacity: 1,641
- Type: Performing arts center; former movie palace

Construction
- Opened: April 2, 1925
- Renovated: 1981; 1995; 2007–2009
- Closed: 1975
- Reopened: 1981
- Architect: Emile Weil

Website
- www.pensacolasaenger.com
- Saenger Theatre
- U.S. National Register of Historic Places
- Location within Florida Location within the United States
- Coordinates: 30°24′37″N 87°12′53″W
- Area: less than one acre
- Architect: Emile Weil
- Architectural style: Spanish Baroque
- NRHP reference No.: 76000596
- Added to NRHP: July 19, 1976

The Saenger Theatre is a historic performing arts center and former movie palace in downtown Pensacola, Florida, United States. Designed by New Orleans architect Emile Weil in the Spanish Baroque style, the theater opened on April 2, 1925, with an original seating capacity of 2,250.

The theater is owned by the City of Pensacola and has a seating capacity of 1,641. It is managed by Legends Global, the company formed from the combination of Legends and ASM Global.

The Saenger was added to the National Register of Historic Places on July 19, 1976. Its nomination cited both its Spanish Baroque architecture and its association with the elaborate theater-going experience of the early 20th century.

== History ==
=== Construction and opening ===
Construction of the Saenger began in 1924 under the C. H. Turner Construction Company of Pensacola. Emile Weil, who also designed Saenger theaters in Mobile, Alabama, New Orleans, and Shreveport, Louisiana, designed the building in the Spanish Baroque style. Construction cost approximately $500,000.

The theater incorporated materials salvaged from the earlier Pensacola Opera House, which had stood near Government and Jefferson streets and was damaged during the 1916 Gulf Coast hurricane. Bricks from the Opera House were reused along the lower exterior of the Saenger, while ornamental iron railing from the Opera House's dress circle was installed around the Saenger's lower balcony. According to the National Register nomination, the bricks had originally been imported from England for construction of the Opera House in 1882.

A 1925 advertisement for Cecil B. DeMille's The Ten Commandments, the feature film presented on the Saenger's opening night

The Saenger formally opened on April 2, 1925. Opening-night tickets ranged from 50 cents for balcony seating to $1.50 for the best seats. The principal motion picture attraction was Cecil B. DeMille's silent epic The Ten Commandments.

The building had an original capacity of 2,250, divided between the main floor and a balcony. It was designed from the beginning to accommodate both motion pictures and live performances. Early programs combined films with vaudeville acts, musical revues, plays, a house orchestra and a theater organist.

=== Early years and movie palace era ===
Opening and operating a major movie palace required a substantial staff. Employees included cashiers, doormen, porters, projectionists, carpenters, electricians, housekeepers, musicians and an organist. About six uniformed female ushers distributed programs, wearing costumes inspired by Pensacola's naval heritage. The theater manager's dog, Big Boy, also served as the Saenger's mascot.

The theater's location near Pensacola's railroad facilities was particularly useful during the vaudeville era. Saenger porters helped performers and travelers move luggage between the railroad station and theater, and at least one touring production arrived with a company of more than 100 performers.

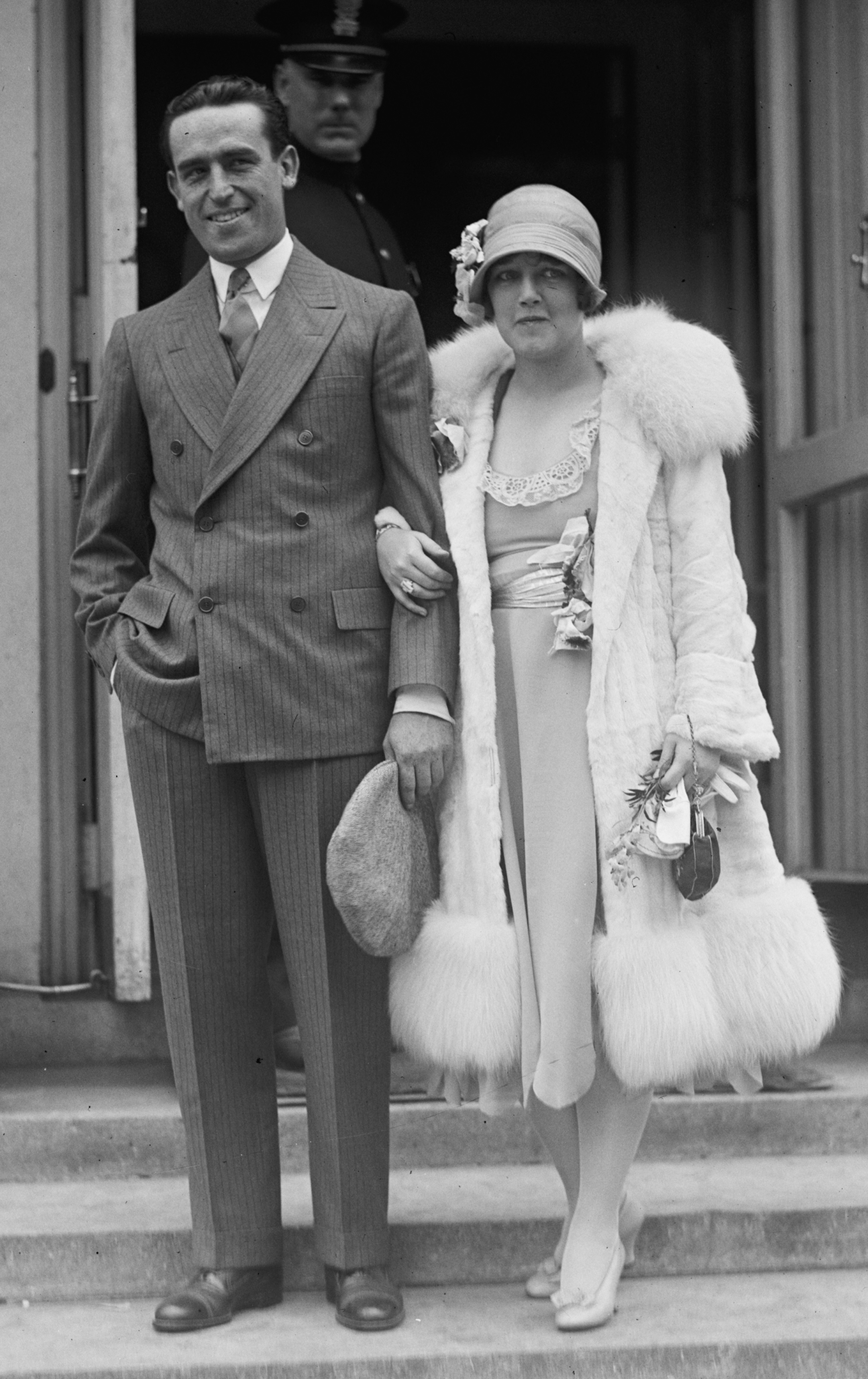
Silent-film star Harold Lloyd and his wife Mildred Davis in May 1925. The couple visited Pensacola shortly after the Saenger opened.

Silent-film star Harold Lloyd and his wife, actress Mildred Davis, visited Pensacola in May 1925, only weeks after the Saenger's opening. A May 19 photograph preserved by the University of West Florida Historic Trust shows the couple with Pensacola civic officials and representatives of the Saenger organization.

In April 1930, the Saenger installed an air-conditioning system, then still a significant luxury for a public entertainment venue. The theater subsequently advertised the cooled auditorium using snow and icicle imagery during Pensacola's hot summer months.

The same year, the theater was the site of an unusual box-office robbery. Burglars broke into a safe but escaped with only about $40 after failing to open a second compartment containing approximately $2,400 in weekend receipts. The suspects were later captured but escaped from the county jail by descending from the building on ropes made from knotted bedsheets.

During World War II, the theater showed newsreels around the clock in addition to its regular movie schedule, a service particularly relevant to the area's large military population associated with nearby Naval Air Station Pensacola.

As motion-picture exhibition changed, the theater was altered to accommodate wider screens. The original boxes flanking the proscenium were removed during the early 1950s, while the main Palafox Street entrance was altered in 1959.

=== Segregation ===
The Saenger operated under the system of racial segregation then prevalent throughout the Southern United States. Its original design incorporated a separate entrance from Intendencia Street for Black patrons. That entrance was physically independent from the theater's other entrances and led by a separate broad staircase to segregated balcony seating.

The surviving documentation of the theater therefore reflects both the architectural grandeur of 1920s movie palaces and the racial segregation that shaped public entertainment in Pensacola during the Jim Crow era.

=== Decline and preservation ===
By the 1960s and 1970s, suburban development, shopping centers, drive-in theaters and changes in movie exhibition contributed to declining attendance at many downtown movie palaces. The Saenger eventually closed in 1975 in deteriorated condition.

In 1976, ABC Southeastern Theatres donated the building to the City of Pensacola. With insufficient public funding immediately available for restoration, demolition of the theater and use of the site for parking were considered.

Local preservation supporters organized to save the building. The campaign brought together citizens, businesses, the City of Pensacola and the University of West Florida. The Friends of the Saenger was formally established on March 17, 1980, to raise money for restoration and continuing improvements.

A restoration project costing approximately $1.6 million returned the building to use as a performing arts center. The Saenger reopened in 1981, with the Duke Ellington Orchestra taking part in the reopening celebration.

In October 1987, the City contracted with Ogden Facility Management to manage the theater, replacing the Saenger Management Board that had overseen its operations after restoration.

=== Restorations and reopening ===
During the 1990s, Friends of the Saenger raised funds for another improvement campaign. In 1992, the organization contributed $50,000 in seed money toward expansion of the lobby. The resulting project, completed in 1995, approximately doubled the size of the Palafox Place lobby and improved accessibility for patrons with disabilities.

Planning for a larger renovation began in 2004, with particular attention to the small stage and inadequate backstage and dressing-room areas inherited from the theater's original vaudeville configuration. Friends of the Saenger pledged $1 million toward the project, while the City of Pensacola provided the remaining funding.

The Saenger during the 2007–2009 renovation and expansion

The theater closed in June 2007 for the project. The approximately $15 million renovation expanded and modernized the stage and backstage facilities, enlarged the orchestra pit, added meeting space and approximately 20,000 square feet of dressing-room and support areas, installed larger seats and restored historically appropriate interior colors and decorative finishes.

The renovated theater reopened in March 2009. Its present auditorium seats 1,641 people, substantially fewer than the original 2,250 because of the larger modern seating and other alterations.

== Architecture ==
The Saenger Theatre exterior and marquee in 2021

The Saenger is an example of the elaborate movie-palace architecture developed during the 1920s. Weil used a Spanish Baroque vocabulary reflecting Pensacola's Spanish colonial history.

The original Palafox Street lobby was approximately 24 feet wide and 90 feet long, with a central entrance space rising nearly 40 feet. Contemporary descriptions cited in the National Register nomination described Spanish tile floors, marble wainscoting, beamed ceilings, ornamental plasterwork and extensive decorative lighting.

The auditorium originally had twelve boxes arranged in two tiers on either side of the proscenium. Decorative elements included crystal and bronze lighting fixtures, green velvet draperies with gold fringe, a green plush-velvet main curtain and elaborate carpeting.

A notable structural component is the steel girder supporting the balcony. Measuring approximately 70 feet long, 8 feet high and 1.5 feet wide, it was described in the National Register documentation as the largest steel girder used in a Florida construction project up to 1925.

The original design also emphasized rapid evacuation. Nineteen exits were provided, with contemporary promotional material asserting that the theater could be emptied in approximately three minutes.

Much of the building's architectural importance derives from the survival and restoration of its original decorative fabric. When the Saenger was nominated to the National Register, evaluators emphasized both its architecture and its ability to convey the experience of the large, highly decorated movie palaces that flourished during the 1920s.

== Pipe organ ==
The Saenger retains its original Robert Morton theater pipe organ, installed when the building opened in 1925.

The instrument was designed to accompany silent films while also providing orchestral effects for live performances. Its components include conventional organ pipe ranks as well as theater effects such as xylophone, marimba, bells, piano, bass and snare drums, tambourine, castanets, cymbals, bird whistle and sleigh bells.

Friends of the Saenger sponsored a major restoration and expansion of the instrument, completed in 2014. The restoration campaign expanded the organ beyond its original configuration, and Friends of the Saenger has continued to raise funds for maintenance and additional enhancements.

== Centennial ==
The Saenger marked its 100th anniversary in 2025. Centennial research by Dean DeBolt, head of the University of West Florida Archives and West Florida History Center, brought renewed attention to details of the theater's early operation, including its large staff, railroad connections, mascot and early advertising.

On the theater's centennial date, April 2, 2025, anniversary programming included a presentation of DeMille's 1923 The Ten Commandments, recreating the principal film attraction from the Saenger's opening night. Other anniversary events included a screening of the 1925 silent film The Phantom of the Opera accompanied by the theater's pipe organ, public activities and performances by local arts organizations.

The theater promoted special programming throughout 2025 under its "100 Years of Stories" anniversary campaign.

== Present-day use ==
The United States Navy Band performing inside the Saenger in March 2025

The Saenger operates as a multipurpose performing arts venue presenting touring concerts, theatrical productions, Broadway shows, films and community events. It also serves as a home venue for local performing arts organizations including the Pensacola Symphony Orchestra, Pensacola Opera, Ballet Pensacola and the Pensacola Children's Chorus.

The present facility contains a 71-by-38-foot stage with a 43-foot proscenium, ten dressing rooms, a 3,000-square-foot meeting room and 1,641 upholstered seats.

Sound mixing position inside the Saenger during a 2018 U.S. Navy Band performance

The theater continues to host both touring and locally produced programming. Its ownership remains with the City of Pensacola, while day-to-day venue management is provided by Legends Global.

== See also ==
- National Register of Historic Places listings in Escambia County, Florida
- Palafox Street
