= Waikiki Theatre =

The Waikiki Theatre, also known as Waikiki Theatre 3 from 1969 and on, was a single-screen movie theater located in Waikīkī, Honolulu, Hawaiʻi. Designed by architect Charles William Dickey, it opened August 20, 1936 and was located at 2284 Kalakaua Avenue until its closure in November 2002. It was demolished in April 2005.

== Organs ==
The Waikiki originally had a Hammond model A organ installed. This was replaced in the first year of operation by a Robert Morton 4-manual 16-rank organ constructed in 1921, taken from the Hawaii Theatre. This organ remained in use at the Waikiki until 1997. When the Waikiki Theatre was torn down, the organ was moved to the Palace Theater in Hilo in 2005.
