= Loew's Jersey Theatre =

Theater in Jersey City, New Jersey

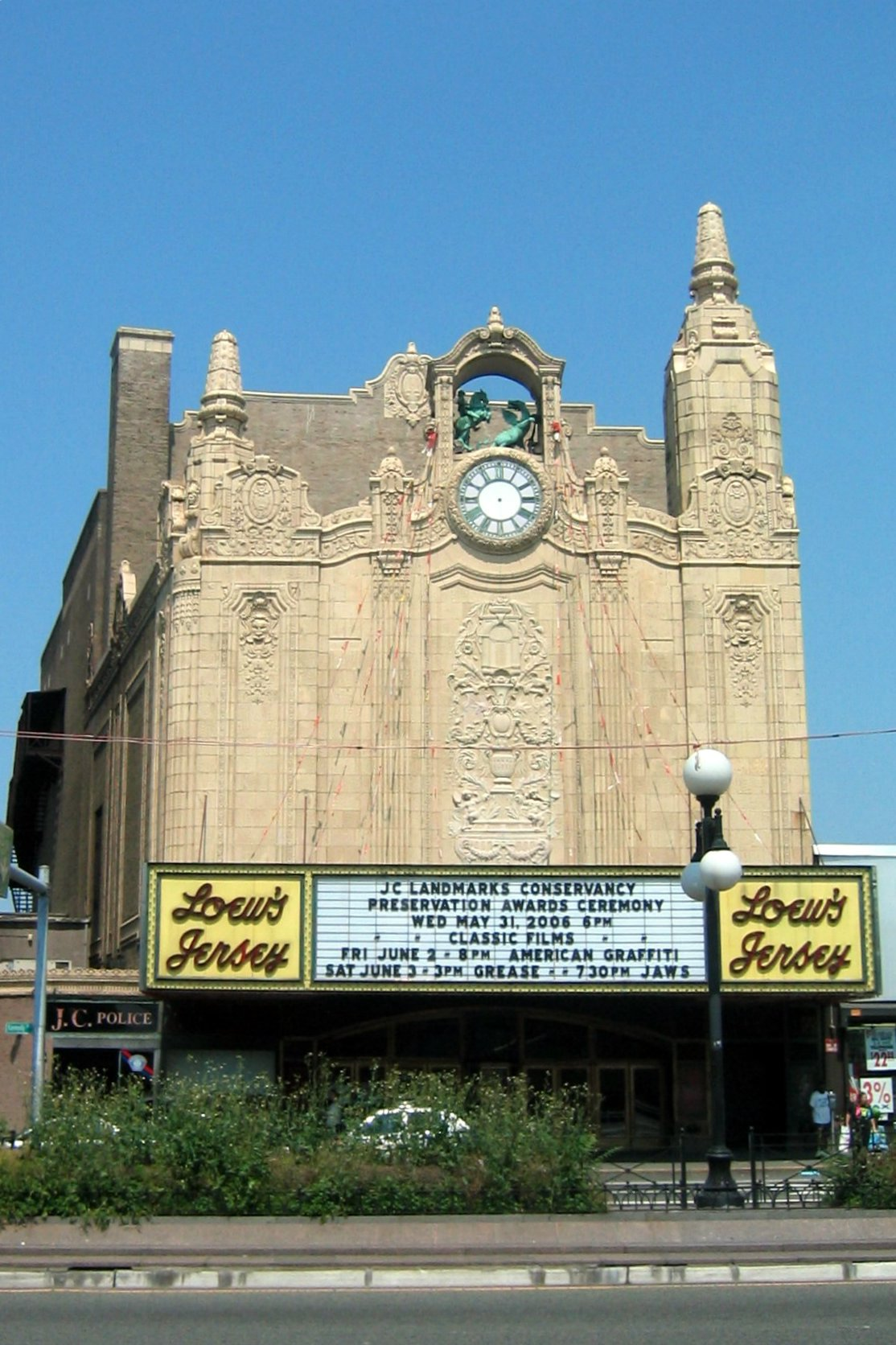
- The facade as seen in 2006
- Interactive map of Loew's Jersey Theatre
- Address: 54 Journal Square; Jersey City, New Jersey; United States
- Coordinates: 40°43′56″N 74°03′52″W
- Owner: Government of Jersey City
- Operator: Harris Blitzer Sports & Entertainment (HBSE)
- Capacity: At least 4,000
- Type: Movie palace
- Current use: Entertainment venue
- Public transit: Journal Square Transportation Center

Construction
- Opened: September 28, 1929 (reopened November 13, 2026)
- Closed: August 21, 1986 (as movie palace)
- Rebuilt: 1986–2001, 2021–present
- Years active: 1929–1986 (as movie palace), 2001–present (as event venue)
- Architect: Rapp and Rapp

Website
- loewsjersey.org
- Loew's Jersey Theatre
- U.S. National Register of Historic Places
- New Jersey Register of Historic Places
- Location: 54 Journal Square, Jersey City, New Jersey, U.S.
- Architectural style: Late 19th & 20th Century Revivals; Baroque Revival
- NRHP reference No.: 100007648
- NJRHP No.: 1518

Significant dates
- Added to NRHP: April 25, 2022
- Designated NJRHP: March 10, 2022 (original date August 15, 1985)

The Loew's Jersey Theatre is a cinema and performance venue at 54 Journal Square in Jersey City, New Jersey, United States. Designed by Rapp and Rapp as a movie palace, it opened on September 28, 1929, as one of five Loew's Wonder Theatres in the New York City area. Owned by the government of Jersey City, the Loew's Jersey has been managed by Harris Blitzer Sports & Entertainment (HBSE) since 2021. That year it was closed for an extensive renovation and reopened in November 2026. It is listed on the New Jersey Register of Historic Places and the National Register of Historic Places.

The Loew's Jersey occupies an irregular site and is divided into two sections: the lobby and the auditorium. The lobby section has an elaborate terracotta facade with a marquee, a mechanical Seth Thomas clock, and a sculpture of Saint George fighting a fire-breathing dragon. The entrance leads to a vestibule and a lobby with high ceilings, in addition to several foyers and lounges. The auditorium has at least 3,021 seats on two levels, with an elaborately decorated proscenium arch, walls, and ceilings. Like the other Wonder Theaters, the Loew's Jersey featured a theater pipe organ manufactured by the Robert Morton Organ Company; the current organ was taken from the Paradise Theater in the Bronx, New York.

Loew's Theatres began developing a theater in Journal Square in 1927. The Loew's Jersey originally presented films and live shows, although the live shows were discontinued in 1935. The theater slowly declined after World War II, screening films almost exclusively, and was split into a triplex cinema in 1974. The theatre closed in August 1986 after Hartz Mountain Industries acquired the theater with the intent of demolishing it and redeveloping the site. Supporters of the theater's preservation formed Friends of the Loew's (FOL), which began restoring the theater after Jersey City's government bought it in 1993. The theater partially reopened for performances in 2001. After several unsuccessful attempts to lease the theater to a third party, Jersey City officials leased the theater to HBSE in early 2021. HBSE closed the theater later that year for an extensive renovation, completed in 2026.

== Site ==
The Loew's Jersey is located at 54 Journal Square in the Journal Square neighborhood of Jersey City, New Jersey, United States. The theater is on an irregular site on the western sidewalk of Kennedy Boulevard, just west of the Journal Square Transportation Center. It is divided into two sections: the lobby section to the east and the auditorium to the west. The PATH railroad tracks run slightly north of the theater. Directly to the south is an alley known as Journal Square Concourse West or Gloria Esposito Way, which links Kennedy Boulevard and Magnolia Avenue. The theater is surrounded by commercial and office structures, including Journal Squared to the east and One Journal Square and 26 Journal Square to the south.

== Architecture ==
The Loew's Jersey was designed by the firm of Rapp and Rapp. The theater is variously described as being in the Spanish Baroque or Italian rococo styles. The theater was one of five Loew's Wonder Theatres in the New York City area and the only one outside New York City proper. The other Wonder Theatres were the Paradise Theatre in the Bronx, the 175th Street Theatre in Manhattan, the Valencia Theatre in Queens, and the Kings Theatre in Brooklyn. The Loew's Jersey was also one of three large movie theaters on Journal Square, along with the State Theatre and the Stanley Theatre.

=== Facade ===
==== Journal Square elevation ====
The primary elevation of the facade faces east toward Journal Square. The facade is clad in cream-colored terracotta and is split vertically into a heavily ornamented central bay and two outer bays. On Journal Square, the lobby section is accessed by a wide doorway. The doors are recessed slightly from the facade, and there is a bronze ticket booth protruding from the middle of the storefront, separating the doors into two sets of four. Bronze columns divide the front of the ticket booth into several sections with bronze panels and glass panes. Above the doorway is an arched transom window. The original marquee above the doorway was curved, but it was replaced in 1949 with a rectangular sign flanked by two rectangular light boxes. In 2024, the marquee was again replaced with an LED sign.

To the north (or right) of the main entrance, under the marquee, is a black-marble exit doorway with sign boxes and a recessed double door. To the south (or left) of the main entrance is a single-story storefront with a glass frieze above it. Approximately half of the storefront is covered by the marquee, while the remainder is topped by a terracotta cornice.

Above the marquee, the central bay is surrounded by a curved frame and includes motifs such as an urn, flowers, a fruit bowl, and cherubs. Atop the frame is a clock manufactured by the Seth Thomas Clock Company, measuring approximately 10 by 12 feet (3.0 by 3.7 m) across. There is also an arched niche with animated figures of Saint George slaying a dragon, designed by an unknown artist. The Saint George and dragon figures are made of bronze and are each 6 feet (1.8 m) tall. The dragon figure could move its jaws, and it also had a red light bulb behind its mouth. Every fifteen minutes, a 550-pound (250 kg) bell rang once, and the dragon's mouth moved to reveal the lightbulb while Saint George raised his sword. A separate 250-pound (110 kg) bell rang every hour, except after 10:00 p.m.

The central and outer bays are separated by pilasters with fluting. The outer bays each contain terracotta frames, and there is a face with a mask at the top of each frame. A frieze runs atop the eastern elevation of the facade. Both outer bays are topped by elaborate parapets with urns and asymmetrical pinnacles; the northern pinnacle, on the right, is taller. Behind the main entrance's facade is the auditorium's facade, which is made of buff-colored brick. The top of the auditorium's facade has a terracotta parapet that steps up toward a medallion at its center. There is also a chimney at the southern end of the auditorium's eastern facade.

==== Other elevations ====
The north elevation, facing a neighboring department store, is made of buff brick with terracotta decorations. Within the theater's eastern (lobby) section, the north elevation consists of three arched panels made of terracotta. Above the lobby's north elevation is a terracotta frieze with a medallion at its center. The theater's western (auditorium) section is also divided into three arched terracotta panels, which are each topped by shields with leaves. There are pilasters between each of the auditorium's panels, in addition to pilasters at the extreme western end of the facade. Above the auditorium's north elevation is another terracotta frieze with shields above each of the three panels, as well as a stepped parapet, similar to the one atop the Journal Square elevation.

The south and west elevations curve into each other and are both plain in design. The south elevation is made of buff brick and faces the adjacent alley, while the west elevation is made of red brick and faces the cul-de-sac at Magnolia Avenue. On the south elevation, the eastern section of the ground story is clad in stucco, and there is a terracotta cornice and a setback above the ground-story storefront. Behind the setback, the easternmost section of the south elevation's upper stories is decorated with a terracotta panel, while the rest of the upper-story facade is clad in plain brick. The west elevation, and the westernmost section of the south elevation, are similar in style except for the brick color. There are several doorways at ground level, a belt course above these doorways, and a fire escape with a canopy.

=== Interior ===
When the theater opened, the interior was described as being decorated in the Italian baroque style. It included a collection of expensive and rare art from Europe. These included furnishings, bronzes, canvases, and clocks from England, France, Germany, and Italy. There was also an air-conditioning system that distributed cooled air throughout the building. At the time of the theater's opening, Loew's characterized the theater as "equal to a trip to the mountains, sea or country". Battisti Studios was responsible for much of the interior design.

==== Vestibule ====
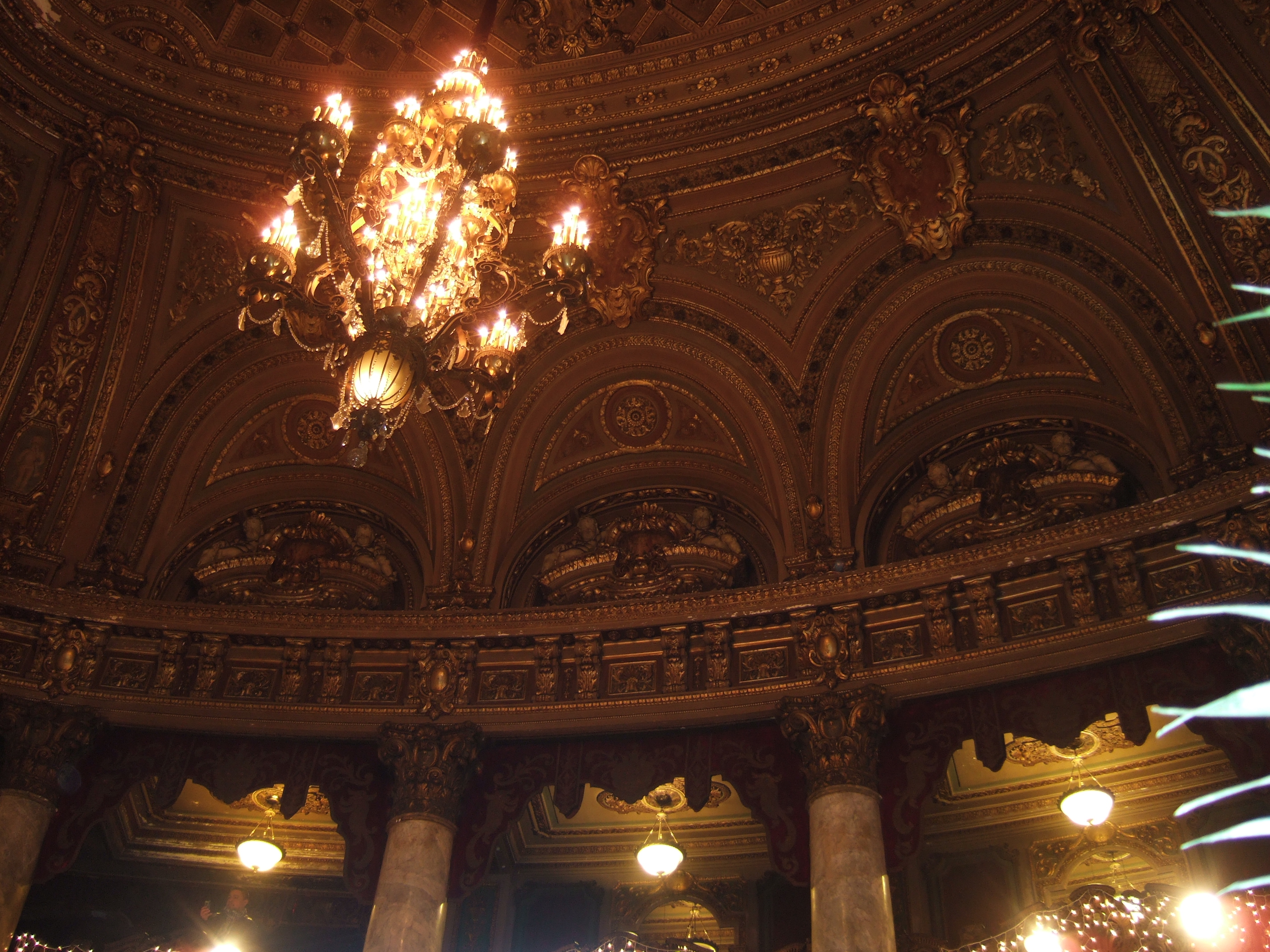
The ceiling of the lobby

The main entrance leads to a vestibule with white and black marble finishes on the walls. The vestibule has a plaster crown molding with leaves and flowers, in addition to a plaster ceiling with medallions and a chandelier. The vestibule's eastern wall has bronze-and-glass doors leading from the entrance, and the western wall has a nearly identical set of doors leading to the lobby. There were originally black-and-white marble ticket booths on the north and south walls of the vestibule, though only the south ticket booth is still extant. There is also a doorway on the north wall, leading to a passage to the theater's northern exit, and a doorway on the south wall, leading to the theater's offices. The office of the theater's assistant manager, to the south, was converted to a restroom in the 2000s.

==== Lobby ====
The lobby is elliptical and has a gold and gray color scheme with blue and red accents. It is elaborately decorated with such motifs as medallions, cherubs, cartouches, faces, floral patterns, fleurs-de-lis, gold ropes, putti, and urns. The terrazzo floor is covered with carpets. The center of the lobby is surrounded by columns in the Corinthian order; the bottoms of the marble columns are clad in copper and rest on marble pedestals. The lower portions of the walls have marble wainscoting, and the lobby's rear wall had mirrors with gilded frames, There are also niches with gold mosaic tiles. The ceiling rises three stories above the ground story and is domed. A six-tiered bronze-and-crystal chandelier is suspended from the center of the ceiling, which cost $60,000 to install.

A pair of curving stairs leads from the lobby to a mezzanine. The staircase on the southern wall has a white-marble newel post with an elaborate lamp, in addition to a bronze balustrade, and fabric panels along the wall. The south staircase's intermediate landing has a gold-tiled niche. The staircase on the northern wall has a bronze balustrade, similar to the one on the south staircase.

The mezzanine, along the main lobby's perimeter, is placed behind the Corinthian columns and has a bronze railing. The mezzanine's outer walls have brocade panels and mirrors, while the coffered ceiling has gold-colored medallions. There were originally velvet furniture along the mezzanine. The northern and southern portions of the mezzanine both have two niches, one each to the west and east, which have turquoise walls and gold-colored plaster decorations. At the eastern end of the mezzanine is the music gallery, which has a domed ceiling, plaster decorations, and walls with brocade panels and mirrors. It originally had a piano, a china collection, paintings, and bronze and silver figures; some of the items were salvaged from one of the Vanderbilt residences in New York City.

==== Foyers and galleries ====
The lobby's ground level connects with the orchestra-level foyer to the west. That space had a red-carpeted floor; a wall with marble wainscoting, gilded pilasters, and red fabric panels; freestanding square piers; and a ceiling with medallions and gold leaf. The orchestra foyer also had an antique French clock. Fireproof kalamein doors on the south wall lead to the basement, while those to the west lead to the auditorium.

The mezzanine foyer, directly above the orchestra foyer, has a red carpet, in addition to blue walls with red brocade panels and golden pilasters. The mezzanine had a pool with live goldfish, which was removed in 1974. This pool is flanked by niches with gold and green tiles. Fireproof kalamein doors lead off the mezzanine foyer to the theater's lounges and restrooms. The ceiling has plaster medallions and gold-and-green decorations.

Next to the mezzanine foyer are separate sets of rooms for men, to the north, and women, to the south. Both sets of rooms include a restroom, a separate washroom, and a lounge. In addition, the women's area includes an octagonal room for cosmetics. The men's lounge is designed in the Elizabethan style and includes a wood-grained fireplace mantel and plaster decorations. The men's restrooms and washrooms have tile floors and walls, in addition to marble partitions. The women's lounge has a marble fireplace mantel with a mirror; plasterwork pilasters, cornices, and ceilings; wooden wainscoting; and a carpeted floor. The women's restroom and washroom have similar floors, walls, and partitions to the corresponding men's room, though the women's restroom was built with only seven stalls. The cosmetic room has marble wainscoting, a carpeted floor, and plaster decorations.

Staircases from the mezzanine's north and south walls ascend to a balcony-level foyer, which leads to the upper section of the auditorium's balcony. The staircases have bronze railings, walls with fabric panels, and plaster ceilings with moldings. On the balcony foyer itself, the walls are divided into panels with gold borders, and there are velvet curtains flanking the panels.

==== Auditorium ====
The auditorium is variously cited as originally having had 3,021, 3,300, or 3,600 seats. Following the 2026 reopening, the theater seats about 2,600–2,700 and holds about 4,000 with the orchestra-level seats removed. (Note: Figures of 2,600 or 2,700 seats have been given.) The seats are spread across a parterre-level orchestra and a balcony level. On both levels, the seats face the stage to the west. The balcony is on the auditorium's eastern end and is divided into rear (upper) and front (lower) sections. The lower balcony's south and north walls include hallways to the lobby mezzanine, while the upper balcony is accessed via the balcony foyer. There are two projection booths behind the orchestra-level seats, next to the foyer, which were built in the 1970s when the orchestra level was divided into two screening rooms. Behind the balcony was a room for members of the press.

===== Design features =====
There are plaster decorations covered with gold leaf. The auditorium is decorated with murals, Greek cross patterns, medallions, gold panels, painted niches, and plaster medallions. The decorations themselves were designed to distribute sound across the auditorium, and a custom chemical mixture was applied to the walls and ceiling to ensure that sound was distributed evenly throughout the theater. At the balcony level, the north and south walls each have three large arches, which each contain red-velvet draperies with gold fringes, in addition to canopies with walnut and gold-colored decorations. Behind these draperies are multicolored lights. In addition, there is a gold-colored balustrade with plaster decorations at the front of the lower balcony. The ceiling was painted blue, with ivory and gold leaf decoration. The auditorium was illuminated by a ten-tiered chandelier with bronze and crystals. The lights within the chandelier could change color to accompany the sound films that were being screened.

On the auditorium's western wall is a proscenium arch. This arch is decorated with panels made of veined marble, in addition to various cartouches. On either side of the proscenium arch is an organ loft with four elaborately decorated columns, topped by a cornice and a domed canopy. Velvet draperies are hung from the organ lofts' cornices. The current movie screen, within the proscenium arch, measures 25 by 50 feet (7.6 by 15.2 m) across and was installed in 2002. The stage is variously cited as measuring 33 by 72 feet (10 by 22 m), or 35 by 75 feet (11 by 23 m), across. The orchestra pit in front of the stage could fit 45 musicians. There is a fly system about 80 feet (24 m) above the stage, in addition to multiple lifts beneath the stage and orchestra pit. In the orchestra pit, there are separate lifts for the piano, organ, and orchestra; the lift below the organ is capable of revolving.

Backstage, workers could prepare sets for as many as ten live acts in advance. The basement was originally divided into rehearsal and storage space, in addition to 50 dressing rooms. The former dressing rooms are placed along the basement's perimeter, measuring about 12 feet (3.7 m) wide and about 12 to 20 feet (3.7 to 6.1 m) long. The center of the basement had a trap room (located directly under the stage) and property rooms. There was a corridor where performers could enter the orchestra lift. Underneath the seating areas was a plenum space, which was part of the ventilation system. The basement's eastern end was originally divided into ushers' rooms.

===== Organ =====
Like the other Wonder Theatres, the Loew's Jersey Theatre has a "Wonder Morton" theater pipe organ manufactured by the Robert Morton Organ Company. The organ features a console with 4 manuals and 23 ranks of pipes. The Jersey's original organ was removed from the theater in 1949. It was moved to the Arlington Theatre in Santa Barbara, California, in 1986, and the organ was rededicated there in 1988.

The current organ console, which had always been intended for installation at the Jersey, was initially installed in the Paradise Theatre by accident. After being removed from the Paradise Theatre, the organ was sold several times before it ended up in Kansas City, Missouri. The organ was moved in 1997 to the Jersey Theatre, where it was rededicated in 2007. The current organ is formally known as the Bob Balfour Memorial Wonder Morton and is the only Wonder Morton still being used at a Wonder Theatre. It is variously cited as having 1,678 or 1,799 pipes. Like the original organ, it has 4 manuals and 23 ranks of pipes and can play sound effects such as thunder and car horns. The pipes are located in the organ lofts and each measure between 5 inches (0.42 ft; 0.13 m) and 16 feet (4.9 m) tall. Pressurized air flows into the pipes from ducts measuring 18 inches (460 mm) wide and over 50 feet (15 m) long. To operate the organ, the operator presses one of several foot pedals at the organ console, which control the amount of air flowing through each air pipe.

== Use as movie palace ==
Movie palaces became common in the 1920s between the end of World War I and the beginning of the Great Depression. In the New York City area, only a small number of operators were involved in the construction of movie palaces. These theaters' designers included the legitimate-theater architects Thomas W. Lamb, C. Howard Crane, and John Eberson. By the late 1920s, numerous movie palaces were being developed in outlying neighborhoods in New York City; previously, the city's movie palaces had been concentrated in Midtown Manhattan. The five Wonder Theatres were developed by Loew's Inc., which at the time was competing with Paramount-Publix. In 1927, Loew's president Nicholas Schenck agreed to take over five sites from Paramount-Publix, in exchange for agreeing not to build competing theaters in Chicago; these five sites became the Wonder Theatres.

=== Development and opening ===
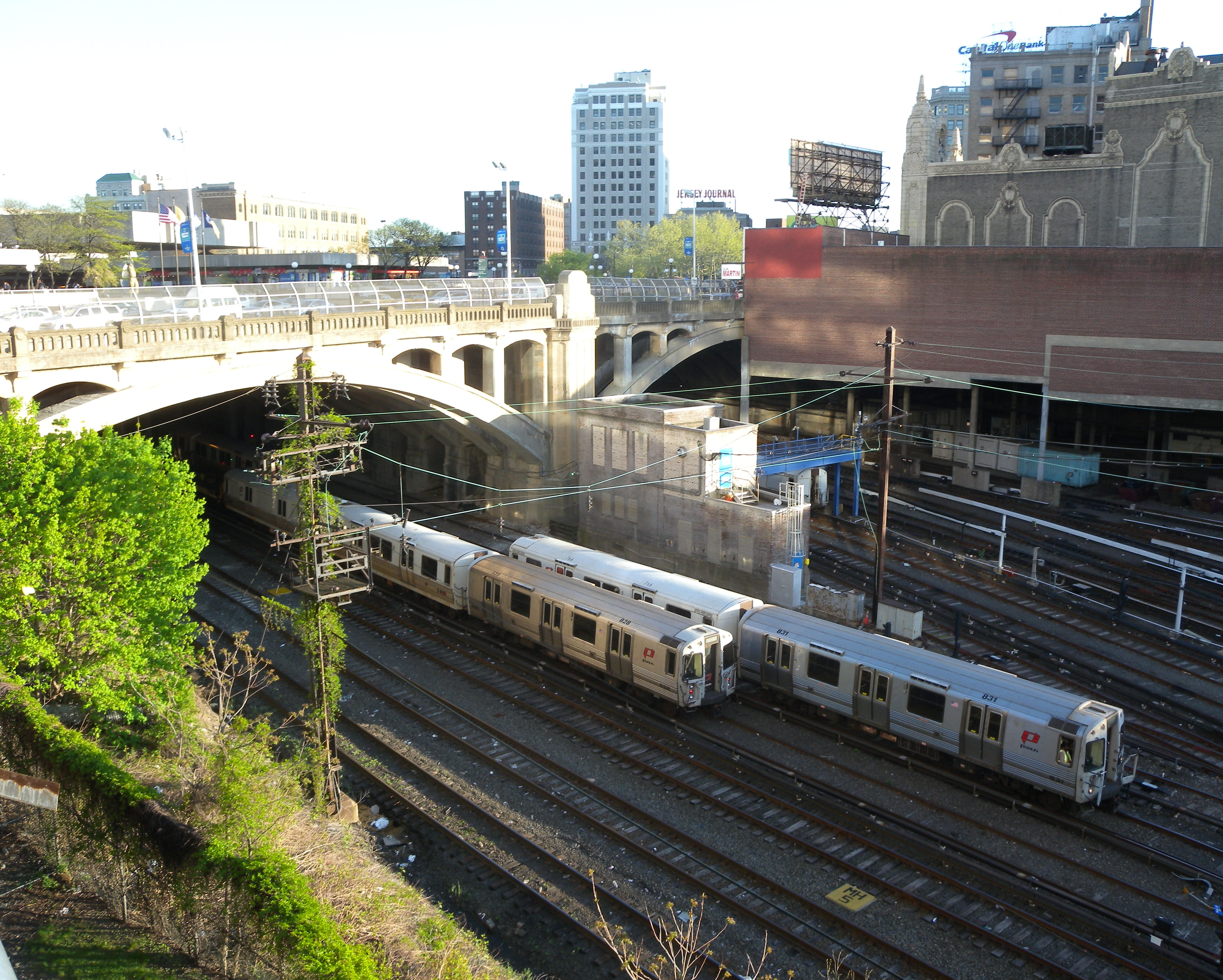
Loew's Jersey Theatre (right) is adjacent to tracks to PATH's Journal Square station.

In 1922, the Pennsylvania Railroad sold a tract of vacant land next to the Hudson & Manhattan Railroad's (H&M) Summit Avenue station (now the PATH's Journal Square station), known as the bowl, for $218,000. New York City businessman Henry S. Kerbaugh was recorded as the owner of the bowl. The Bergen Square Realty Company, also operated by Kerbaugh, acquired the land in January 1923 for $2.46 million. Kerbaugh announced plans in 1925 for a garage and showroom on the bowl site. The bowl plan evolved into a $3 million project for a theater and 16-story office building. The project was contingent on the Jersey City government's approval of a roadway connecting Journal Square with Pavonia Avenue to the north. However, this roadway was not approved, and the project languished.

By 1927, Loew's was planning a theater near the Journal Square bowl, one of several development projects in the neighborhood. The site was chosen because it was easily visible from Journal Square and was close to the H&M station there. The theater, which had originally been intended to be constructed in Staten Island, New York, was planned in conjunction with a 17-story hotel in Journal Square, developed by Bowman-Biltmore Hotels. In mid-1927, Loew's received permission to remove part of the adjoining Plaza Bridge's balustrade to make way for the theater, provided that plans for the theater were finished in six months. However, Rapp and Rapp were unable to finish their plans on time. Due to the growing popularity of talking films, the theater was redesigned partway through the development process to accommodate these types of movies. The modifications included acoustic improvements to distribute sound evenly through the auditorium. J. J. Schneberger obtained a construction permit for a 4,000-seat Loew's theater in early 1928. That July, Loew's awarded a $3 million construction contract for a new theater to the Masem Construction Company. The theater was nearly complete by April 1929.

Despite an ongoing advertiser boycott of The Jersey Journal, Loew's ran large numbers of advertisements in that newspaper prior to the theater's opening. When the theater opened on September 28, 1929, its first film was Madame X. The Jersey Theatre was the third Wonder Theatre to open that month, after the Paradise and Kings theaters, which had opened on September 7. The Loew's Jersey had cost $2 million and was the first movie theater in New Jersey to be developed specifically for sound films. The theater's opening featured performances from local musicians, directed by Don Albert; in addition, the actor George K. Arthur greeted visitors at the opening. Ben Black was the original master of ceremonies, Leo Weber was its original organist, and George Dumond was its first managing director.

=== Operation ===
When it opened, the Loew's Jersey presented first runs of films produced by United Artists and Metro-Goldwyn-Mayer, along with newsreels, short films, and stage shows that had already been performed at the Capitol Theatre in Manhattan. First-run films were screened at the Loew's Jersey before they appeared in any other movie theater in the state. Stage shows from the Capitol Theatre were successively sent to the Loew's Paradise, Kings, Valencia, and Jersey theaters. In its early years, the Jersey City Theater hosted first runs of films, interspersed with dance revues, vaudeville, graduation ceremonies, and contests. Patrons originally paid 25 cents for front-row seats and 20 cents for all other seats, and a new show was hosted every week. The theater screened a wide variety of films throughout its history, ranging from the 1939 film Gone with the Wind to the 1986 film Howard the Duck. The Loew's Jersey was a frequent hangout for North Jersey couples.

==== 1920s to 1940s ====
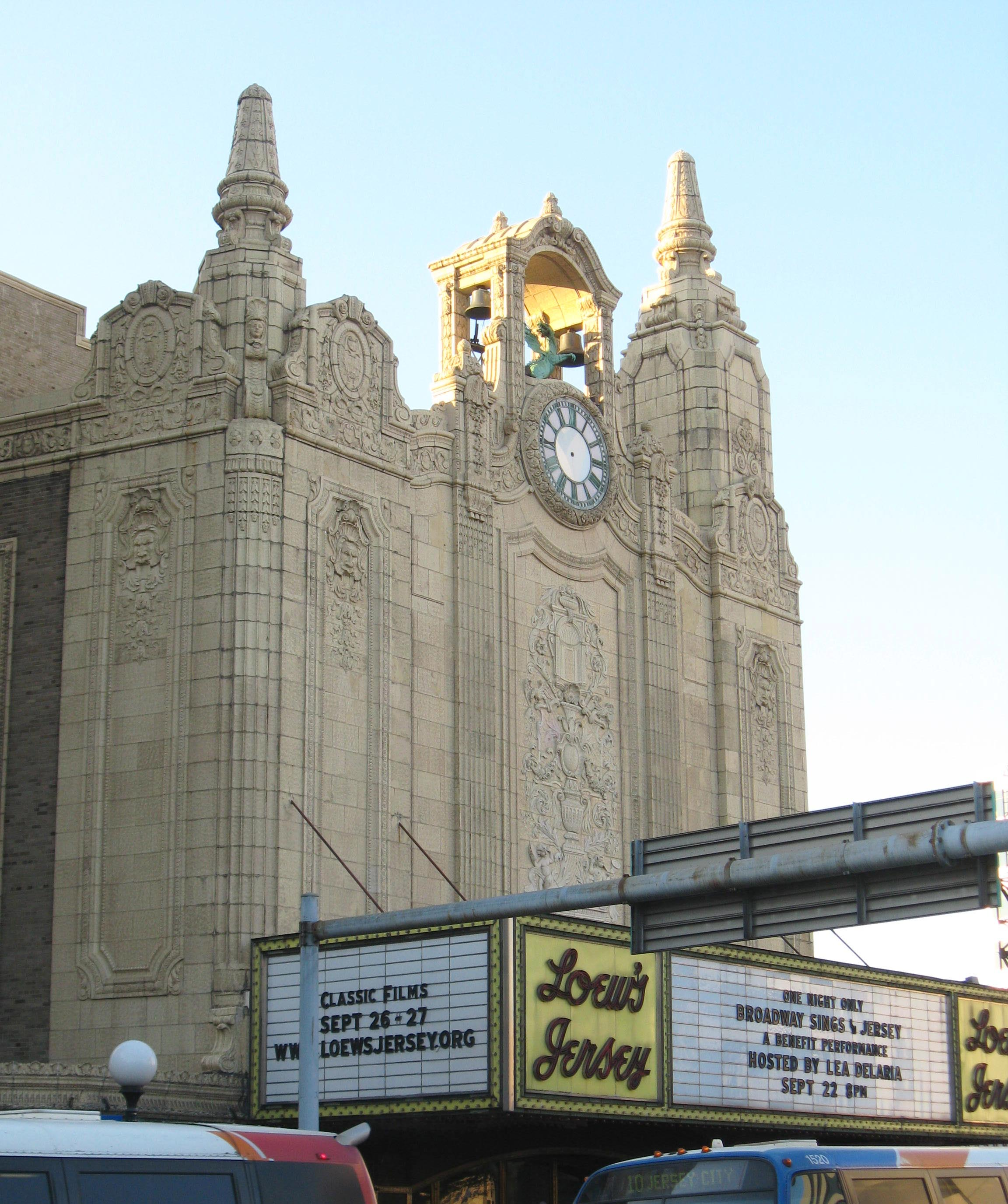
Seen at dusk

The orchestras at the Jersey City theatre and Loew's other theaters began performing at alternating Loew's theaters in late 1929. Loew's also hosted competitions on the Jersey City Theatre's stage, and the theater broadcast weekly music performances over the radio. In 1930, Loew's installed a Trans-tone wide screen at the Jersey City Theatre. Jersey City mayor Frank Hague arranged a major celebration for the theater's first anniversary, which was celebrated by the cutting of a massive cake. The Bayonne Times reported that the theater was often filled to capacity. The theater's stage shows were rescheduled in 1931 so that they opened on Fridays, rather than on Saturdays as they previously had. By then, the Jersey City Theatre was one of the few Loew's theaters that still hosted vaudeville. A concession stand was also added to the theater in approximately the early 1930s. The theater recorded more than a million annual patrons in the 1930s, maintaining its popularity despite the onset of the Great Depression.

Loew's began hosting five-act vaudeville shows at the Jersey in 1932. The 1933 season, which included performances by Bob Hope, Bing Crosby, Bojangles Robinson, and Milton Berle, was typical of the theater's offerings. According to some accounts, Frank Sinatra decided to become a singer after seeing one of Crosby's shows at the Loew's Jersey. (Note: Sources disagree on whether Sinatra visited the theater in 1933 or 1935.) The theater hosted an even more elaborate stage show, featuring the actors George Jessel and Jackie Cooper, to celebrate its fifth anniversary in 1934. Loew's decided to stop hosting live shows at the Jersey City Theatre in August 1935, switching to an all-film program. At the time, the company was eliminating vaudeville shows from most of its theaters. The screening of China Seas the same month marked the first time that a film had been screened at the Loew's Jersey Theatre for more than a week. Film screenings at the theater continued to attract large crowds into the late 1930s.

The Loew's Jersey sold war bonds for the United States military during World War II. The theater may also briefly have presented live shows during the war. It hosted symphony concerts each Sunday through 1945, and it also hosted an annual beauty contest. After Dumond retired as the theater's manager in 1945, James Kolbeck (Note: Though contemporary sources spell the manager's name as "Kolbeck", it has also been spelled "Kolpeck".) took over. Under Kolbeck's leadership, the theater was renovated. For instance, the orchestra pit and the original organ were covered in 1949, as the theater no longer hosted live shows at that point. In addition, a "Glascreen" movie screen was installed the same year. A new marquee was added in 1949, and a new air-conditioning system was added as well. One of the theater's later managers recalled that the air-conditioning system had helped increase attendance during the summertime.

==== 1950s to early 1980s ====
Following the U.S. Supreme Court's 1948 ruling in United States v. Paramount Pictures, Inc., Loew's Theaters was forced to split up its film-production and film-exhibition divisions. As part of the split, William Analante took over as the theater's manager. Additionally, a 1,000-square-foot (93 m^{2}) panoramic screen was installed at the theater in 1953, and lenses and projectors were added. Patronage declined by 50% in the decades after World War II. By the 1960s, Loew's Theaters Inc. had begun to struggle financially, and the chain closed some of its larger theaters due to high expenses. In addition, urban residents had begun to move to the suburbs, and neighborhood movie houses had to compete with shopping-mall multiplexes and household televisions. As such, visitor numbers decreased in the 1960s, although the Jersey Theatre avoided closing completely.

Amid concerns over vandalism, in the mid-1960s, Loew's invited antiques dealers to remove the theater's art for safekeeping. The Loew's Jersey began hosting events such as a televised boxing match in 1964, and it started screening multiple first-run films the same year as part of the Showcase program. During the same decade, the vertical sign on the theater's facade was removed, and the auditorium's sound equipment was upgraded. The lobby was renovated in 1965 with new tiles, lighting, and carpeting. The theater hosted its last stage concert of the 20th century in 1968, and the theater celebrated its 40th anniversary the next year with a reenactment of the original dedication ceremonies. Additionally, the Loew's Jersey began hosting Greek-language films once a week in 1970.

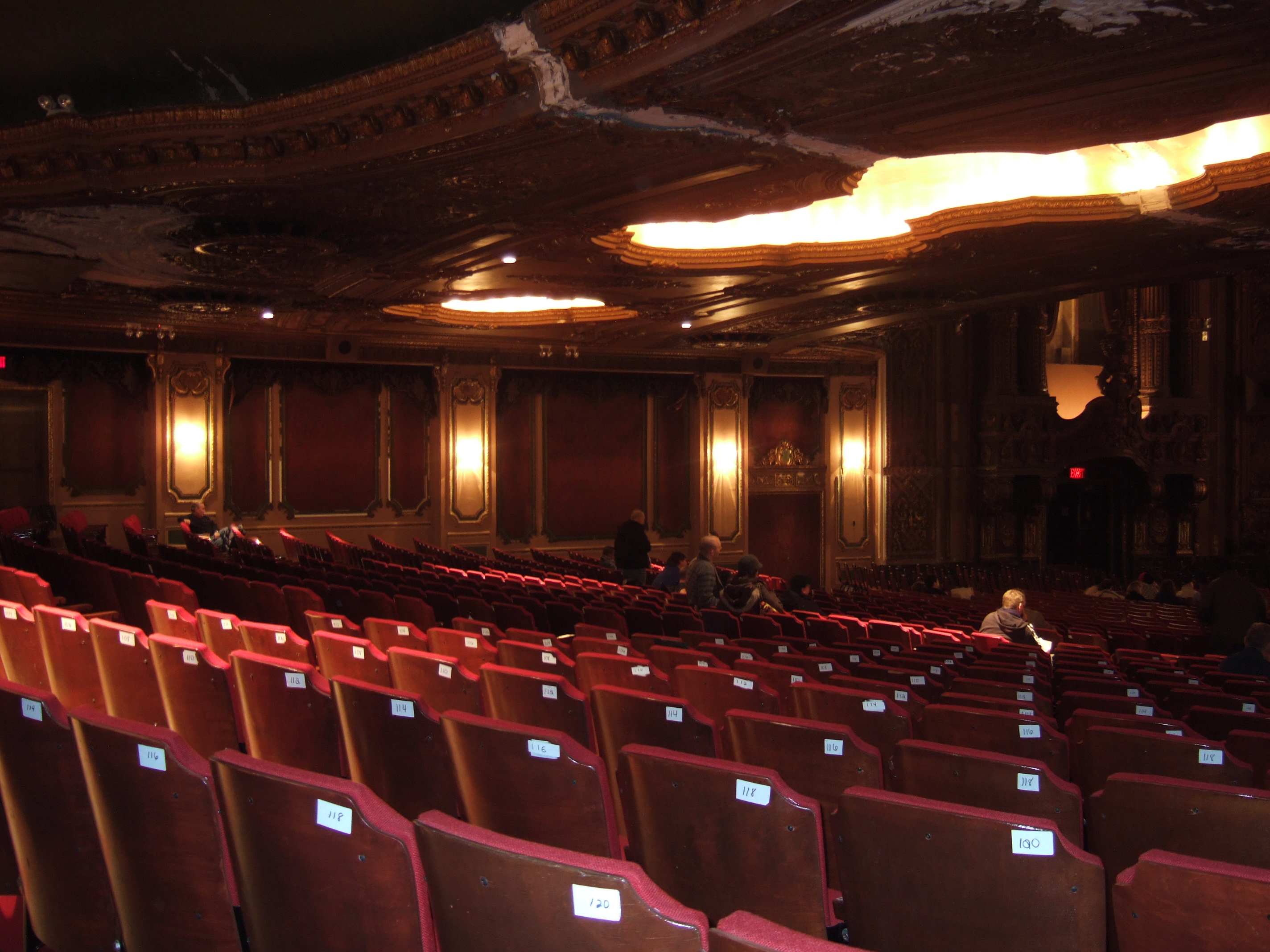
The auditorium was split into three screening rooms in 1974.

The theater was split into three screening rooms in 1974. The project, which was carried out by the Woodbay Construction Corporation of Cedarhurst, New York, required closing the theater for four months. Two 524-seat screening rooms were created on the orchestra level, and the balcony was converted into a third, larger screening room with 1,078 seats. Though many seats were removed, most of the decorations remained intact. The original organ, which at the time was the only Wonder Theatre organ still in place, was removed as well. The stage was sealed off, and air vents were added to replace the original air vents. When the theater reopened in December 1974, it was the first triplex theater in North Jersey. After its conversion, the Loew's Jersey initially saw increased patronage. There was increasing petty crime in Journal Square by the early 1980s, prompting police officers to patrol the Jersey Theatre daily. In addition, there was increasing competition from other multiplex cinemas being developed in North Jersey. Before long, unruly groups of teenagers made up much of the theater's remaining clientele.

=== Closure ===
In early 1984, Jersey City's City Council approved a study to determine whether the area around the Loew's Jersey Theatre should be designated as a blighted area, permitting the city government to acquire property via eminent domain. Loew's and local developer Hartz Mountain Industries formed a partnership to replace the Loew's Jersey and an adjacent parking garage and store with two office towers. The plans included retail, parking garages, a connection to the Journal Square PATH station, and 1.6 million square feet (150,000 m^{2}) of offices. Loew's also canceled the lease of a card shop in the theater. Before the development could proceed, the Jersey City government held public meetings on whether to declare the site as blighted. Preservationists asked the Jersey City Historic District Commission to designate the building as a city landmark. The city's planning board recommended that the site be designated as blighted, and the City Council implemented the board's recommendation in September 1984.

The theater was added to the New Jersey Register of Historic Places on August 15, 1985, though the owners objected to the listing. Although it was also eligible for addition to the National Register of Historic Places (NRHP), the theater was not listed at the time because of an objection from the owners. Hartz Mountain bought the theater for about $1.5 million in early 1986; the agreement was finalized that October. By that time, the Saint George and dragon figures on the facade had been broken for several years. The theater closed on August 21, 1986. The final films shown were Friday the 13th Part VI: Jason Lives and One Crazy Summer. After the Jersey Theatre closed, the city government contemplated requiring Hartz to preserve the theater's facade and lobby, and Hartz initially agreed to preserve these parts of the theater. Although the theater was designated as a Jersey City landmark, the City Council had to pass a resolution for the landmark designation to have any legal effect.

== Abandonment and redevelopment ==
=== 1980s and 1990s ===
==== Proposed demolition ====
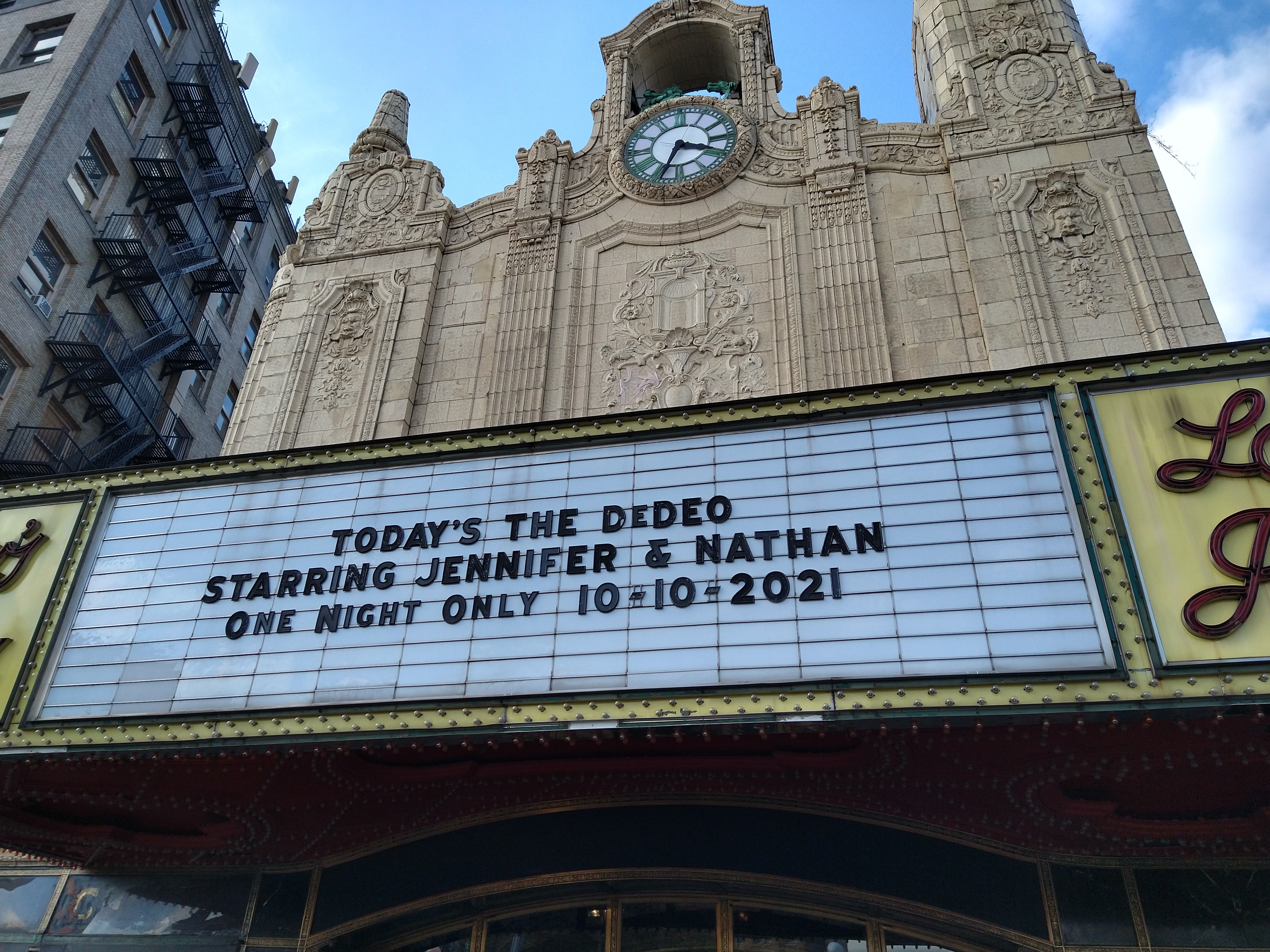
The theater's marquee

The week after the theater closed, the National Endowment for the Arts provided a $10,000 matching funds grant for the theater's preservation, provided that the local community raise a corresponding amount. By January 1987, Hartz was no longer interested in preserving the theater and instead requested a demolition permit. A state judge denied Hartz's request, prompting Hartz to sue the Jersey City government. Two local groups established the Friends of the Loew's (FOL) to save the theater. Colin Egan, who later led FOL, recalled that he had become involved in the theater's preservation after noticing the theater's dilapidated condition while stopped at a traffic light. Thousands of people signed petitions supporting the theater's preservation, and the actors Tony Randall and Phyllis Newman protested outside the theater in April 1987 to oppose its demolition. The same month, the City Council approved a redevelopment plan for Journal Square, which was revised later that month. Hartz was also not allowed to do anything to the theater for 135 days. Egan claimed that the site would have been vacant if the theater had been razed, as Journal Square was in the midst of an economic downturn.

Meanwhile, Jersey City mayor Anthony R. Cucci criticized the City Council's vote, saying it made the city government vulnerable to a lawsuit from Hartz. At the time, the United States Supreme Court had recently ruled that private property owners, such as Hartz, could sue municipalities for failing to allow a "reasonable use" of their land. Cucci vetoed the Journal Square redevelopment, but the City Council overturned the veto. The City Council commissioned a study on the theater's preservation, hiring two New Jersey firms to conduct the study. However, Hartz refused to let the consultants enter the theater, so the study results were not published until September 1987. The study found that it was feasible to restore the structure, but Hartz and Cucci claimed that it would be too expensive for the city government to take over the theater. State judge Burrell Ives Humphreys ruled in July 1987 that the city was not required to issue Hartz a demolition permit. After a property appraiser valued the theater site at $3.4 million, Hartz asked the city government to either buy back the theater or allow Hartz to redevelop the site and demolish the auditorium. In November 1987, the Jersey City planning board voted to recommend that Hartz be allowed to redevelop the site.

==== Performing-arts center plans ====
Cucci vetoed a proposal to save the theater in January 1988, but the City Council once again overruled him. Hartz offered to establish a performing arts center at the theater, donate the building to the city for $1, and drop its lawsuit, in exchange for receiving tax abatements and being designated as Journal Square's developer. The alternate plan was proposed in part due to growing grassroots efforts to preserve the theater. That July, Hartz and the Jersey City government finalized their agreement. Preservationists, Hartz employees, and representatives of the Jersey City and Hudson County governments were appointed to the performing arts center's board. Hartz agreed to sell the theater to the performing arts center if $4 million was raised by the end of 1992; otherwise, Hartz would take back the theater. The performing arts center was intended to help revive Journal Square's economy. One study estimated that the city government would spend $1 million annually operating the Loew's Jersey Theatre.

Local volunteers began cleaning and repairing the theater, working beneath temporary floodlights. The seats were overgrown and moldy, the stage was flooded, paint was peeling off, and the lights were broken. Hartz agreed to maintain the facade, illuminate the theater, and build a new roof. The Jersey City Historical and Preservation Association (JCHPA), one of the two groups that made up FOL, also planned to remove the interior partitions and replace the boiler and plumbing system. The theater needed additional repairs, including upgrades to mechanical systems, electric wiring, fire-safety equipment, and dressing rooms. Egan planned to obtain a new theater organ as well. During the renovations, local students' artwork was displayed on the theater's facade. Although the city government estimated that the theater would cost $12 million to renovate, the JCHPA estimated that the work would cost half that. In 1990, a judge ruled that the city government had to refund Hartz $84,000 in property taxes that had been paid for the theater.

The Jersey City Economic Development Corporation (JCEDC) provided a $1 million grant for the theater's restoration in 1991, and the state government allocated another $1 million. By then, the auditorium still needed extensive renovations. By 1992, cost estimates for the project ranged from $4.2 million for a basic restoration to $8.5 million for extensive equipment upgrades. During this time, the theater's lobby held weekly events, and it was also used for receptions and other gatherings. Jersey City's City Council was scheduled to vote to allocate $2 million in bonds for the theater's renovation in August 1992. However, the vote was postponed after objections to the performing arts center arose. By December 1992, the city government was negotiating to buy the theater from Hartz, avoiding the need to raise $4 million before the end of that year.

==== City takeover and restoration ====
The Jersey City government voted on February 10, 1993, to buy the theater, paying Hartz $325,000. Preservationists had to devise restoration plans and raise sufficient funds within a year, or else the theater would be resold. The city leased it to the JCEDC, while FOL was selected to restore the theater. Volunteers subsequently began renovating the theater with assistance from professional contractors. Egan, whom the JCEDC employed as a consultant, was the only worker who received a salary; he recalled that he sometimes spent 16 hours a day on the renovation. By mid-1994, work on the lobby, was about to begin. Various parts of the renovation were funded by grants, including $1 million each from the New Jersey Historic Trust and the Jersey City government. FOL still needed up to $3 million for a full restoration.

FOL volunteers met every weekend, leaving the theater's front doors open to attract more volunteers. The volunteers repaired the facade and interior, replaced the mechanical systems, removed the interior partitions, and cleaned out garbage and debris. Employees of nearby companies helped restore the theater, including Goldman Sachs investment bankers and Fleet Bank employees. In 1996, the city government and JCEDC requested that the City Council ask the state for $500,000 in Urban Enterprise Zone (UEZ) funds to install new seats. The UEZ funds were ultimately approved in May 1997. That year, the Garden State Theatre Organ Society (GSTOS) acquired an organ that had originally been installed at the Loew's Paradise Theatre. The GSTOS loaned the Paradise's organ permanently to the Jersey Theatre, and the organ was shipped from Kansas City to Jersey City. In addition, the sidewalk outside the theater had to be rebuilt before workers could refurbish the dressing rooms in the theater's basement.

Many of the volunteers were not particularly skilled in construction, and some aspects of the renovation took several years. By the late 1990s, there were 150 dedicated volunteers who met at the theater regularly, in addition to 1,000 people who volunteered occasionally. In several cases, the volunteers conducted repairs for a fraction of the official cost estimates. For example, the restoration of the orchestra pit cost $37–39, rather than the official estimate of $200–250 thousand. (Note: Sources disagree on whether the repairs cost $37 or $39. In addition, the official estimate for the repairs has been cited as either $200,000 or $250,000.) Volunteers spent $3,000 re-illuminating the marquee in 1997, far below the official cost estimate of up to $75,000. The sound technician Robert Eberenz helped restore the projection equipment, which included a mid-20th-century Perspecta sound system and three projectors. FOL also cleaned and reupholstered the theater's seats, which were reinstalled starting in May 1999. The theater's clock was removed for restoration that July. FOL also began raising $50,000 for other upgrades. Egan estimated that volunteers had donated $1 million in labor.

=== 2000s and early 2010s ===
==== Auditorium reopening and continued repairs ====
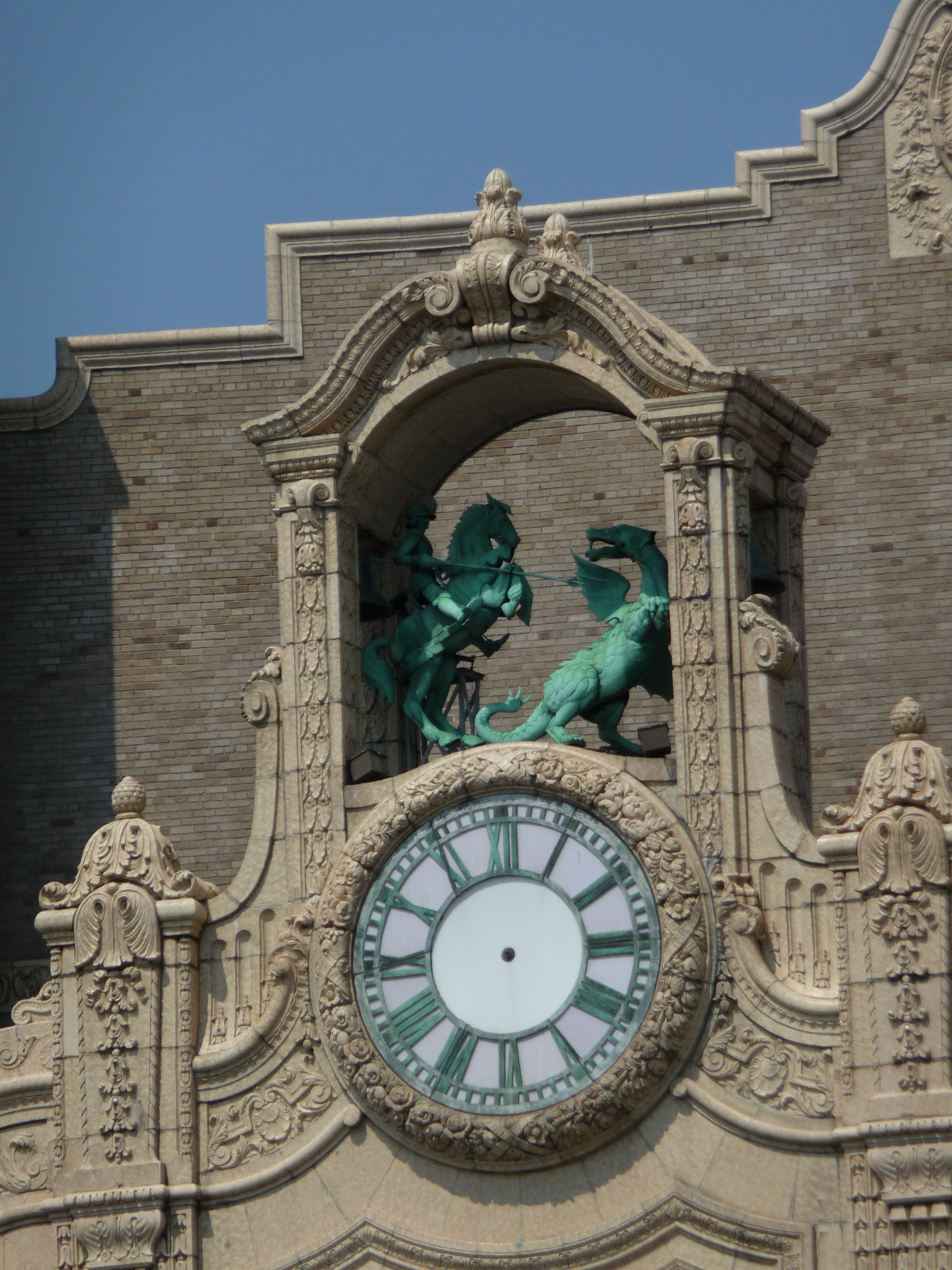
The theater's clock and the Saint George and dragon figures were rededicated in May 2001.

The clock and the Saint George and dragon figures were rededicated in May 2001, and the organ was rededicated the next month after it had been partly restored. The Jersey Journal reported that only the balcony and dressing rooms remained unfinished, although The Record cited a FOL spokesman as saying that the restoration was only half complete. The auditorium partially opened in 2001, and Comcast donated funds for a new screen the next year. Initially, the Loew's Jersey hosted events such as rock-and-roll concerts, weekend film screenings, and film festivals. FOL volunteers staffed these events, working as janitors and concessionaires. Because there was no functioning sprinkler system, the city government had to issue temporary certificates of occupancy for each event, and fire marshals had to attend each performance. Meanwhile, FOL continued to restore the theater. Egan said in 2002 that up to $1 million was still needed for fire-safety upgrades and a restoration of the balcony, while other estimates ranged up to $5 million.

After FOL's lease expired in June 2003, Jersey City's mayor Glenn D. Cunningham wanted to lease the theater to a third party. FOL signed an agreement with the City Council in early 2004, but Cunningham did not ratify the agreement, affecting FOL's ability to raise funds and schedule events. Because of the uncertainty over the lease, the city government could evict FOL at any time, and donors were unwilling to make large donations. The City Council and Cunningham continued to argue over the lease until Cunningham died in May 2004. Acting mayor L. Harvey Smith proposed giving FOL a five-year lease but subsequently suggested conveying the theater to a city agency. FOL signed a five-year lease in October 2004, paying a nominal fee of $1 annually, with two renewal options, and the City Council also approved the lease. The next year, the Hudson County government gave FOL $600,000, which would have been used for air conditioning, and the Jersey City government received additional donations from building owners.

When Jerramiah Healy became mayor in 2004, his administration and FOL began involved in disputes over the theater's management. City government officials gave conflicting messages as to the lease's validity, and Healy's administration claimed that the lease was invalid. The city government also withheld up to $2.5 million that had been earmarked for the Loew's Jersey. The disagreements over the lease went unresolved until 2009, when Jersey City's City Council approved a memorandum of understanding, which allowed the mayor to appoint more people to FOL's board. Meanwhile, the theater's organ was rededicated in October 2008 following repairs, and work on the balcony's restoration began the next year after the Provident Bank Foundation donated $5,000. By the late 2000s, the Loew's Jersey City had become a popular venue for alternative rock concerts and vintage film screenings. The Journal Square Restoration Corporation and FOL also collaborated to host events on Friday nights.

In 2010, newly-elected governor Chris Christie took back $11 million in unspent UEZ funds from the Jersey City government, including some funding allocated for the Loew's Jersey. Some of the doors were replaced in the early 2010s, and workers also repaired the storefronts. Healy announced in 2013 that he would stop allocating city funds for the Loew's Jersey's restoration. The theater was temporarily closed the same year after a passerby discovered a crack in the theater's facade. Meanwhile, FOL volunteers continued to repair the balcony and lounges gradually. Although the city had withheld significant financial support from the Loew's Jersey, the theater still received funding from various donations, charitable grants, and ticket revenue. The theater still had no functioning air conditioning and was operating at a net loss by 2013, at which point it hosted 50 events annually. City officials claimed that FOL had failed to raise sufficient funds for the theater, while Egan countered that the city had withheld some of these funds. KRE Developers, which was constructing a building nearby, offered $2.5 million for the theater's restoration.

==== AEG lease and legal dispute ====
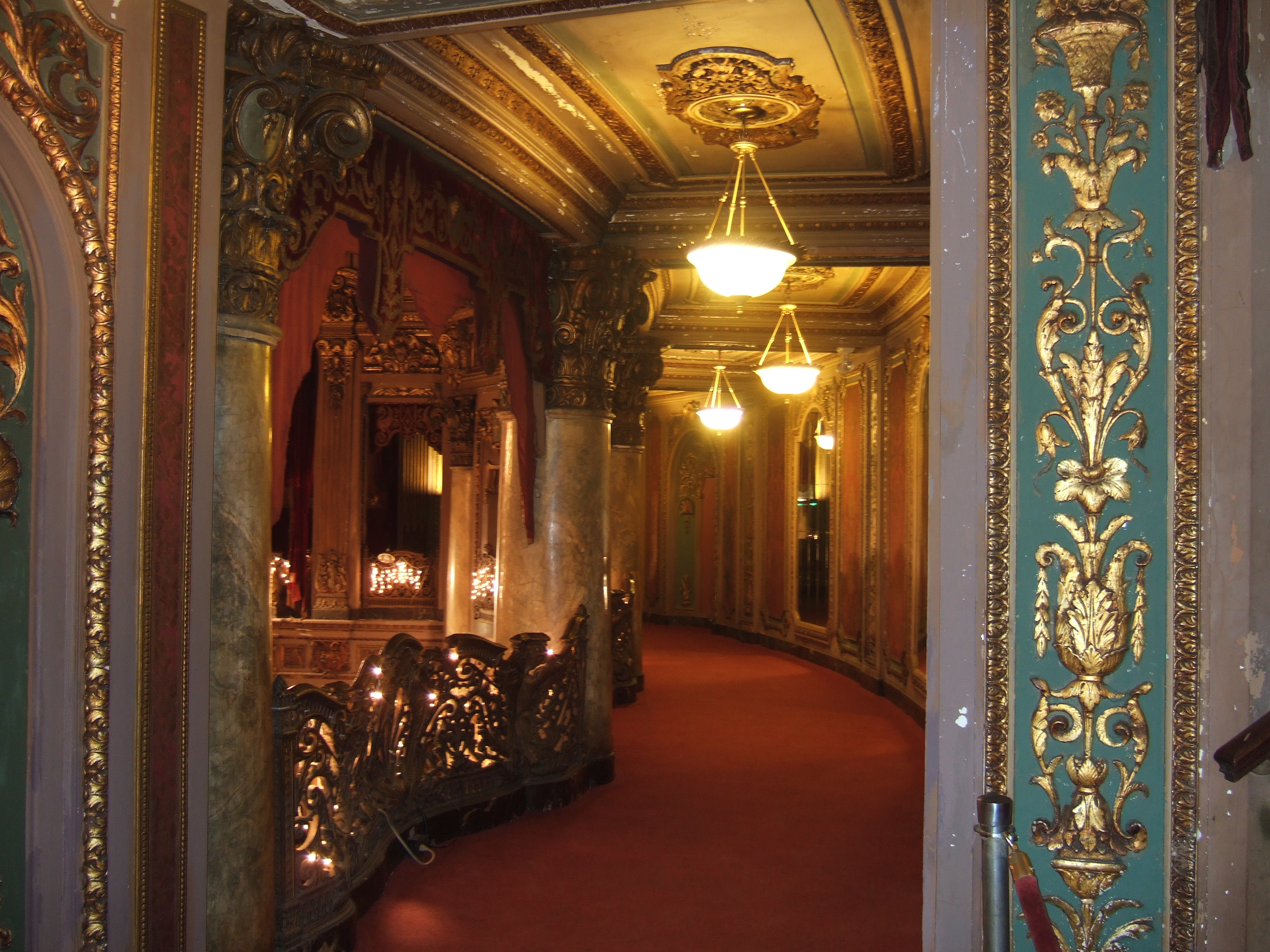
A corridor in the theater

Jersey City officials again wanted a third party to take over the theater by November 2013. City officials claimed that a professional management team would help the theater compete with North Jersey concert venues such as the Wellmont Theater and New Jersey Performing Arts Center. In addition, city officials wanted the Loew's Jersey Theatre to be the centerpiece of a redeveloped Journal Square, which had seen less new development than eastern Jersey City. Jersey City mayor Steven Fulop opened a request for proposal for the theater's management in February 2014. Fulop ordered that all work related to the Jersey Theatre's development be paused. FOL sued the city government that March, claiming that its lease was still in effect, but Hudson County judge Hector Velazquez initially ruled that the lease extension was not valid. Four large concert promoters, each of whom partnered with local community groups, submitted bids to restore the theater.

In June 2014, Jersey City officials awarded the contract for the theater's management to AEG Live. AEG was to provide $3.5 million toward a restoration, and it would rent the theater for 30 years at an annual cost of $350,000. The roof, seats, carpets, and bathrooms would be repaired for $30–40 million. FOL opposed the AEG's selection, and Egan claimed that the theater's conversion to a commercial venue would not benefit the local community. Velazquez overturned his own decision on the lease in July 2014, and he ruled in May 2015 that the city government could not evict FOL until 2020. The agreement with AEG was rescinded, and the lease by Friends of the Loews remained in effect.

Jersey City's freeholder board voted in August 2015 to rescind a $300,000 grant, which would have funded mechanical upgrades to the theater. FOL, which contended that the grant's revocation was a retaliatory measure, successfully asked a judge to reverse the grant's rescission. The New Jersey Superior Court reversed Velazquez's ruling in April 2017, saying that the lower court had not adequately addressed the city's claim that FOL had breached the terms of the lease. The Jersey City government withdrew its lawsuit against FOL that June. In addition, the city government announced that it would begin installing fire-safety equipment at the theater, funded by $2.5 million each from the developers of the nearby Journal Squared and One Journal Square skyscrapers. FOL's lease continued to run until February 2020.

=== 2020s to present ===
==== Renovation ====
In 2020, the Jersey City government and FOL decided to proceed with a $40 million renovation of the Loew's Jersey. During the COVID-19 pandemic, the theater's marquee displayed messages for the local community, and the auditorium hosted events like graduations that required social distancing. Devils Arena Entertainment, a subsidiary of Harris Blitzer Sports & Entertainment (HBSE), was selected to renovate the theater in February 2021, at which point the renovation was slated to cost $72 million. As part of HBSE's agreement, the company had to stage 20 music, 10 theatrical, and 10 comedy shows each year, in addition to performances sponsored by FOL. The theater's balcony level remained closed, and the theater lacked sprinklers, a functioning air-conditioning system, and wheelchair accessibility. The renovation was to include upgraded mechanical systems, upgraded exits, and new concession and ticket areas. LED screens would also be installed throughout the theater. Removable seats would be installed on the orchestra level to allow the theater to host both concerts and conventions.

The redesigned theater needed to meet the United States Department of the Interior's design standards because it was a New Jersey state landmark. The Jersey City Historic Preservation Commission tentatively approved HBSE's proposal for the theater's renovation in July 2021. The Loew's Jersey hosted an open house in September 2021 for its 92nd anniversary, and it closed for renovations following a wedding the next month. The renovation was initially scheduled to take four years. The Phelps Construction Group was hired to conduct the renovation. The Jersey Theatre was listed on the NRHP in 2022, and the New Jersey Economic Development Authority (NJEDA) issued a $42.27 million tax credit for the theater's renovation that year. FOL expressed concerns that the city government was planning to sell the theater, but city officials denied these rumors. At the end of 2022, the Jersey City Municipal Council voted to transfer ownership of the theater to the Jersey City Redevelopment Authority (JCRA), which would allow the NJEDA to issue tax credits to the theater.

By mid-2023, the renovation cost had increased to $105 million; the reason for the increased cost was not fully explained, as construction had not even started. Former governor Jim McGreevey, who was campaigning to become the mayor of Jersey City, requested that the JCRA explain the cost increases. To facilitate the renovations, Phelps proposed temporarily closing a heavily-used alley next to the theater, but residents opposed the closure. The towers on the facade were disassembled for restoration; replica carpets and seats were installed; the ceiling murals were repainted; an elevator was built to the balcony; and workers updated the plumbing, electrical, and HVAC systems. In late 2024, a floodlight on the roof was reactivated, illuminating the dueling Saint George and dragon figures, and workers removed the original marquee to replace it with a digital sign. That year, the city designated the JCRA as the operator of the theater's community programs, replacing FOL. The project ultimately cost $130 million.

==== Reopening ====
A general manager for the theater was hired in early 2026, and the manager announced in September that the theater would reopen in November. The theater was formally rededicated on November 9, 2026. The lobby chandelier, the organ, and new movie screens were not ready at the reopening and were due back in 2027. HBSE's agreement required the theater to host 55 community days a year.

== The Friends of the Loew's community organization ==
Friends of the Loew's (FOL), a volunteer community organization formed in 1987 to oppose the theater's demolition, helped secure its preservation and Jersey City's acquisition of the building in 1993. The organization subsequently undertook extensive restoration work using volunteer labor and operated the theater for approximately 20 years following its reopening in 2001, presenting concerts, film screenings, author appearances, and community arts programming.

Following the theater's reopening in November 2026 after a $130 million renovation, Friends of the Loew's expressed concern about its future role in the venue's operations and community programming. Although Mayor James Solomon voiced support for the organization's continued involvement, negotiations over a formal relationship remained ongoing. Discussions included the composition of the Friends' board and potential representation by city officials. The group's director, Colin Egan, expressed cautious optimism that it would retain a role in guiding community programming, but concern that no agreement had yet been reached despite its decades of preservation work and operation of the theater.

== Notable people and events ==
In the 1920s and 1930s, the Loew's Jersey hosted performers such as Gracie Allen, George Burns, Cab Calloway, and Duke Ellington. Other celebrities that appeared there included Jack Benny, Lauren Bacall, Mickey Rooney, Robert Montgomery, and the Ritz Brothers. In addition, actors like Jean Harlow, Judy Garland, and Humphrey Bogart visited the theater to promote their films. After it reopened, the Loew's Jersey hosted performances by musicians including Patti LaBelle, Vina Morales, Paul Sorvino, Beck, Courtney Barnett, Sufjan Stevens, and Kurt Vile. It has also hosted bands such as The Decemberists, The Duprees, Neutral Milk Hotel, and Yo La Tengo. In addition, the annual Golden Door Film Festival was hosted at the Loew's Jersey Theatre in the 2010s.

The Loew's Jersey was used for film, video, and photography shoots starting with the 1990s renovation. For example, the theater was used as a filming location for the movies Illuminata, The Last Days of Disco, Cradle Will Rock, and Joker, in addition to the TV special TSO: The Ghosts of Christmas Eve. and an episode of Next Great Baker season 2. It was also featured in music videos for Elton John's song "Recover Your Soul", as well as for music videos by the singer D'Angelo, the band Alice in Chains, and the band Veruca Salt. The theater was used as a filming location for Queen Latifah's film A Perfect Christmas in 2006, and one of the Loew's events inspired the 2010 documentary film Saturday Nightmares, which was shot at the theater. The band The Strokes shot a music video for the single "Under Cover of Darkness" from their 2011 album Angles at the Loew's Jersey.

== Reception ==
=== 20th century ===
When the theater opened, the Bayonne Evening News wrote that the facade was imposing and that the interior "reflects the utmost in magnificence and structural skill". The New York Herald Tribune described the theater as "magnificently constructed and sumptuously decorated", while the Jersey Journal praised the "grandeur of the interior". Another source described the theater as New Jersey's "most lavish temple of music and entertainment". Boxoffice magazine wrote in 1969 that the Jersey Theatre had "embodied virtually every new feature in theatrical elegance, convenience and mechanical equipment" when it opened. The Record of Bergen County, New Jersey, wrote that the theater had been "New Jersey's answer to Radio City Music Hall".

When the Jersey Theatre stopped operating as a movie palace in 1986, the Jersey Journal said: "For many, a chapter of history has ended." The New York Times wrote in 1992, "The cavernous auditorium sits neglected, suspended in time like a cathedral in a war zone." Another writer for the same newspaper, in 1997, compared the theater's interior to those of Vatican City's buildings. The next year, a critic for Film Journal International wrote that, despite its dilapidated condition, the theater still resembled a grand European opera house.

=== 21st century ===
After the theater partly reopened in the 2000s, a writer for The Clifton Journal wrote that the interiors were comparable to those of St. Patrick's Cathedral or Buckingham Palace, while Egan likened the building to a Venetian or Parisian building. The Record described the theater as "one of [Marcus Loew's] last and grandest movie cathedrals". A Times writer said in 2004 that the theater's design evoked nostalgia in longtime Jersey City residents, while newcomers would be "blown away by the over-the-top rococo lobby". In 2013, The Wall Street Journal described the Loew's Jersey as one of several New York City–area movie theaters with "exteriors that loom large", describing the Jersey in particular as "outlandishly Rococo". The Daily Beast wrote in 2014 that "glimpses of its former glory are visible once the eyes adjust to the darkness". A reviewer for The Star-Ledger in 2017 compared the theater to a palace, although he said that the film quality suffered slightly because of the auditorium's large size and the use of physical 35 mm film.

Following the reopening in November 2026, the restored theater drew praise from critics and officials for its ornate interiors. Writing for NJ.com, Bobby Olivier called it the most breathtaking place to experience live entertainment in New Jersey and described the building as "an overwhelmingly ornate, four-story cathedral of sculpture and tapestry". Wrote Olivier:

It's a rare feeling to experience pure, dumbstruck wonder, to exist in a space so magnificent, so committed to craft, that it affirms the soul and stretches the limits of stupefying human capability.

New Jersey Monthly wrote that the restored space comes alive again "in all its beautiful, ornate glory", and 6sqft said the theater "gleams once again in all its Roaring 20s glory". Jersey City mayor James Solomon described the venue as "this extraordinary palace".

== See also ==
- National Register of Historic Places listings in Hudson County, New Jersey
- New Jersey music venues by capacity
