= You Only Live Once (song) =

2006 single by The Strokes

Single by The Strokes

from the album First Impressions of Earth
- B-side: "Mercy Mercy Me (The Ecology)"
- Released: 2006
- Genre: Garage rock
- Length: 3:09
- Label: RCA, Rough Trade
- Songwriter: Julian Casablancas
- Producer: David Kahne

The Strokes singles chronology
"Heart in a Cage" (2006)	"You Only Live Once" (2006)	"Under Cover of Darkness" (2011)

Music video
- "You Only Live Once" on YouTube

"You Only Live Once" is song by American rock band the Strokes. It is the opening track on their third studio album, First Impressions of Earth. The song was written by Julian Casablancas with production from David Kahne and Gordon Raphael. It was released as the third and final single from the album in 2006 by RCA and Rough Trade Records. They have performed this song on several programs, including The Tonight Show with Jay Leno and Late Night with Conan O'Brien.

A cover of Marvin Gaye's "Mercy Mercy Me" was recorded as a B-side and features Eddie Vedder of Pearl Jam sharing vocals with Casablancas, while Josh Homme (of Queens of the Stone Age, Them Crooked Vultures and Eagles of Death Metal) plays drums alongside Fabrizio Moretti.

When the song was released as a single, the Strokes launched Operation You Only Live Once prompting all of their fans to call and request the single on radio stations. Their goal was to try to get out the word of the new single as fast as possible, by spreading the song by word of mouth. The Strokes' Myspace page asked all users to put the song in their profile in an attempt to spread the single among the online community.

== "I'll Try Anything Once" ==
An alternate version of the song, entitled "I'll Try Anything Once", is included as one of the B-sides on the "Heart in a Cage" single. It features Nick Valensi playing electric piano while Casablancas sings. Some of these lyrics were also present when the Strokes played the song for the BBC's Radio 1 Session, which aired on March 8, 2006.

Though this version is officially claimed to be the original demo track, it was actually recorded after "You Only Live Once". This was done as the band needed an additional B-side, and Casablancas wanted to use lyrics from an earlier draft of the song, prior to it being edited and shortened to be more pop.

Casablancas played the song live on the tour for his solo album, Phrazes for the Young. He also performs the song on his live album, Live from Electric Lady Studios, WRXP New York. Artists who have covered the song include Haim and Clairo.

The soundtrack to Sofia Coppola's 2010 film Somewhere included "I'll Try Anything Once". The song also featured prominently in the film's trailer. This version of the song also featured at the end of the 4th episode in series 4 of ITV's Secret Diary Of A Call Girl.

== Reception ==
Released on July 24, 2006, the single hit No. 35 on the Billboard Alternative Songs chart. It was listed at No. 16 on Rolling Stone's list of the 100 Best Songs of 2006. In 2020, The Independent and Paste ranked the song number eight and number seven, respectively, on their lists of the 20 greatest Strokes songs.

== Music video ==
The initial music video for the single was directed by Samuel Bayer, who had previously helmed the "Heart in a Cage" video, and features the band performing in an enclosed room that slowly fills with brown water. Julian Casablancas commented on the video saying, "People tell us all the time we're gonna die from smoking, but you only live once," implying that the room is the band members' lungs and the water is tobacco tar. The video can be seen as a reference to the Rolling Stones' video of It's Only Rock 'n Roll (But I Like It), in which the band can be seen playing in a tent that eventually fills with bubbles. The video was set to premiere in the UK on May 24, 2006, but was delayed due to last-minute edits until June 21, 2006. Yahoo! premiered the video in the U.S. on June 27.

An alternate music video for the song, which was the first directed by Warren Fu, premiered on the social media site imeem on May 29, 2007. It contains the very end of "Ize of the World" and it works as an homage to 2001: A Space Odyssey and as a video protest against war, hunger, and consumerism.

== Track listing ==
UK, EU 7"
No.	Title	Writer(s)	Length
1.	"You Only Live Once"	Julian Casablancas	3:06
2.	"Mercy Mercy Me (The Ecology)" (feat. Eddie Vedder & Josh Homme)	Marvin Gaye	2:38

== Personnel ==
The Strokes

- Julian Casablancas – vocals
- Nick Valensi – guitar
- Albert Hammond Jr. – guitar
- Nikolai Fraiture – bass guitar
- Fab Moretti – drums

Additional musicians

- Eddie Vedder – vocals on "Mercy Mercy Me (The Ecology)"
- Joshua Homme – additional drums on "Mercy Mercy Me (The Ecology)"

Production

- David Kahne – producer, engineer
- Andy Wallace – mixing
- Steve Sisco – assistant mixing engineer
- Howie Weinberg – mastering

== Charts ==
Chart (2006)	Peak position
Australia (ARIA)	52
CIS Airplay (TopHit)	200
US Alternative Airplay (Billboard)	35

== Certifications ==
Region	Certification	Certified units/sales
Australia (ARIA)	Gold	35,000^{‡}
New Zealand (RMNZ)	Gold	15,000^{‡}
Portugal (AFP)	Gold	10,000^{‡}
Spain (Promusicae)	Gold	30,000^{‡}
United Kingdom (BPI)	Silver	200,000^{‡}
United States (RIAA)	Gold	500,000^{‡}
^{‡} Sales+streaming figures based on certification alone.
