= Under Cover of Darkness =

2011 single by The Strokes

Single by the Strokes

from the album Angles
- B-side: "You're So Right"
- Released: February 9, 2011
- Recorded: 2007–2010
- Studio: Avatar (New York City); One Way (Upstate New York); Electric Lady (New York City)
- Genre: Garage rock revival; alternative rock; post-punk revival
- Length: 3:56
- Label: RCA; Rough Trade
- Songwriter: The Strokes
- Producers: Gus Oberg; The Strokes

The Strokes singles chronology
| "You Only Live Once" (2006) | "Under Cover of Darkness" (2011) | "Taken for a Fool" (2011) |

Music video
- "Under Cover of Darkness" on YouTube

"Under Cover of Darkness" is a song by the American rock band the Strokes. The single served as the lead single for their fourth studio album, Angles, and was released online on February 9, 2011, as a free download for 48 hours exclusively. It was the first single release from the band in five years, following "You Only Live Once" in 2006. "Under Cover of Darkness" received positive reviews, reaching BBC Radio 1's A Playlist before debuting at number 47 on the respective chart. In October 2011, NME placed it at number 133 on its list "150 Best Tracks of the Past 15 Years".

== Music video ==
The music video for the song was released on March 2, 2011. The video was directed and produced by Warren Fu at Loew's Jersey Theatre in Jersey City, New Jersey, on February 17, 2011. The video begins with a clip of the music video for "You Only Live Once", and contains a reference to the song "Last Nite".

== Commercial performance ==
"Under Cover of Darkness" is the third most successful single in the band's discography. It peaked at number 12 on Billboard's Alternative Songs chart and charted a total of 17 weeks.

== In popular culture ==
"Under Cover Of Darkness" was made available for download on July 24, 2012, to play in Rock Band 3 Basic and PRO mode utilizing real guitar / bass guitar, and MIDI compatible electronic drum kits / keyboards. It appears on the setlist for Rocksmith which was released in October, 2011 in North America.

== Track listing ==
All tracks are written by The Strokes.

Digital download
| No. | Title | Length |
|---|---|---|
| 1. | "Under Cover of Darkness" | 3:55 |

Vinyl
| No. | Title | Length |
|---|---|---|
| 1. | "Under Cover of Darkness" | 3:55 |
| 2. | "You're So Right" | 2:34 |

== Personnel ==
Credits adapted from Angles liner notes, and per Gus Oberg.

The Strokes

- Julian Casablancas – vocals
- Nick Valensi – lead guitar, backing vocals
- Albert Hammond Jr. – rhythm guitar
- Nikolai Fraiture – bass guitar
- Fab Moretti – drums, shaker, backing vocals

Production

- Gus Oberg – production, engineering, recording, mixing
- The Strokes – production
- Joe Chiccarelli – additional production
- Noah Georgeson – mixing
- George Marino – mastering

== Charts ==
=== Weekly charts ===
| Chart (2011) | Peak position |
|---|---|
| Belgium (Ultratip Bubbling Under Flanders) | 18 |
| Belgium (Ultratip Bubbling Under Wallonia) | 24 |
| Canada Hot 100 (Billboard) | 88 |
| Canada Rock (Billboard) | 13 |
| France (SNEP) | 75 |
| Ireland (IRMA) | 46 |
| Japan Hot 100 (Billboard) | 9 |
| Scotland Singles (OCC) | 41 |
| Switzerland Airplay (Schweizer Hitparade) | 71 |
| UK Singles (OCC) | 47 |
| US Bubbling Under Hot 100 (Billboard) | 16 |
| US Hot Rock & Alternative Songs (Billboard) | 23 |
| US Rock & Alternative Airplay (Billboard) | 23 |

=== Year-end charts ===
| Chart (2011) | Position |
|---|---|
| US Alternative Songs (Billboard) | 46 |

== Certifications ==
| Region | Certification | Certified units/sales |
|---|---|---|
| Australia (ARIA) | Gold | 35,000^{‡} |
| United Kingdom (BPI) | Silver | 200,000^{‡} |
| United States (RIAA) | Gold | 500,000^{‡} |
^{‡} Sales+streaming figures based on certification alone.

== Release history ==
| Region | Date | Format |
|---|---|---|
| Worldwide | 09 February 2011 | Digital Download |
| United Kingdom | 1 March 2011 | Vinyl |
