= First Impressions of Earth =

Studio album by The Strokes
- Released: December 30, 2005
- Recorded: January – October 2005
- Studios: Red Carpet (New York City); Allaire (Catskills)
- Genres: Indie rock; post-punk revival; new wave
- Length: 52:19
- Labels: RCA (US); Rough Trade (UK)
- Producers: David Kahne; Gordon Raphael

The Strokes chronology
Room on Fire (2003)	First Impressions of Earth (2005)	Angles (2011)

Singles from First Impressions of Earth
- 1. "Juicebox" Released: October 4, 2005; 2. "Heart in a Cage" Released: March 20, 2006; 3. "You Only Live Once" Released: September 6, 2006

First Impressions of Earth is the third studio album by American rock band The Strokes. It was released through RCA Records first on December 30, 2005, in Germany, on January 2, 2006 in the UK and on January 3, 2006, elsewhere. Three singles were released from the album: "Juicebox", "Heart in a Cage", and "You Only Live Once".

== Recording ==
The album was recorded over a ten-month period. The Strokes initially set out to record it with Gordon Raphael, the producer of their first two albums. However, guitarist Albert Hammond, Jr. later introduced them to Grammy Award-winning producer David Kahne (Paul McCartney, Tony Bennett, Sublime), and they brought him in to collaborate with Raphael. The collaboration did not end up working out, leading Gordon Raphael to step down. As a result, Kahne produced the majority of the album.

== Reception ==
=== Critical ===
Professional ratings
Aggregate scores
Source	Rating
Metacritic	69/100
Review scores
Source	Rating
AllMusic	3/5 stars
The Austin Chronicle	3/5 stars
The A.V. Club	B+
Entertainment Weekly	B+
The Guardian	3/5 stars
NME	8/10
Pitchfork	5.9/10
Rolling Stone	3.5/5 stars
Spin	5/10
Yahoo! Music UK	6/10 stars

The album has a score of 69 out of 100 from Metacritic based on 38 reviews indicating "generally favorable reviews". Some of the reviews were among the harshest the Strokes had received up to this point in the band's recording career. For instance, Heather Phares of AllMusic called the release The Strokes' "weakest album yet,". At the same time, positive reviews were also received from the likes of Will Hermes of Entertainment Weekly who praised the album and thought it was a marked improvement over the Strokes' previous record Room on Fire. In his "Consumer Guide", Robert Christgau gave the album a three-star honorable mention while picking out two songs from the album ("You Only Live Once" and "Ask Me Anything") and stating, "You know how it is--the gym does more for your wind than for your jump shot."

Other reviews were positive. Playlouder gave it four-and-a-half stars out of five and said, "Turns out what the world was waiting for really was those that saved guitars finally making a record that truly reaped the rewards of their efforts." Punknews.org gave it a score of three-and-a-half stars out of five and said, "What exactly it is the Strokes ultimately hope to achieve with their music remains to be seen. However, so long as they continue to put out quality discs with high replay value, they will remain that rare breed of band where hype did not spoil the goods." MusicOMH gave it a score of three-and-a-half stars out of five and stated, "For the first six songs, the whole thing is as exhilarating as Is This It, it's in a different way, undoubtedly, but there's the same giddy rush of excitement." Stylus Magazine gave it a B− and called it "the first pretty good album of the year." Tiny Mix Tapes also gave the album a score of three-and-a-half stars out of five and said, "There is indeed more good than bad. Unfortunately, there is also more bad than there should be."

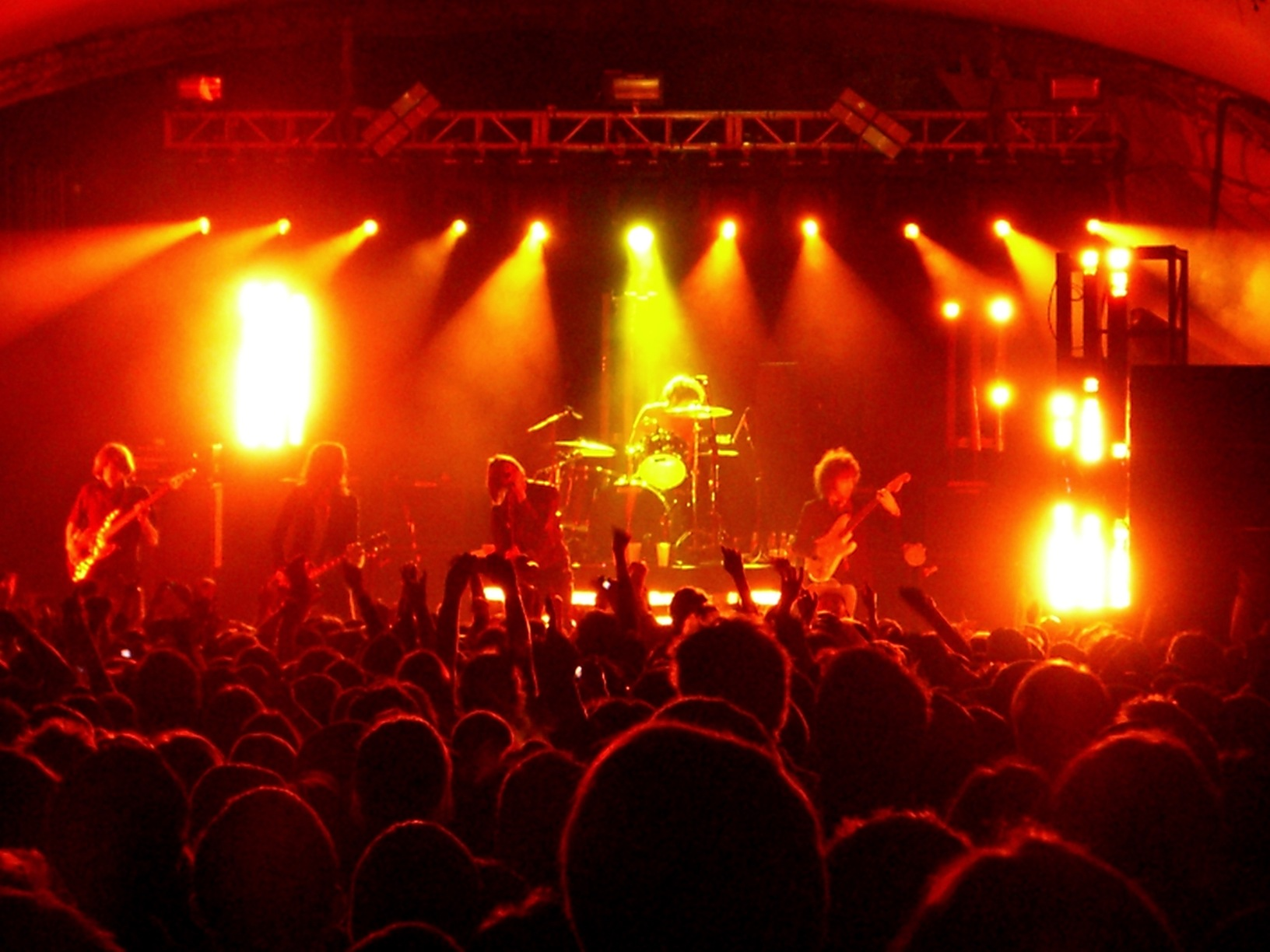
The Strokes live at Stubb's March 14th night before SXSW

Some of the reviews are mixed or negative. Drowned in Sound gave it a score of six out of ten and stated, "Cast away the politics and the last twenty minutes and you'll still be left with two or three top tunes to add to your daily playlists, but it was never going to be ground-breaking or innovative." Uncut gave it three stars out of five and said, "The ambition's hampered by Julian Casablancas' sad-sack singing." Paste also gave it a score of six out of ten and stated, "By the time they're through brandishing quotations, The Strokes don't have much of their own to say here." Slant Magazine gave it two-and-a-half stars out of five and said it "introduces some subtle new colors to the band's musical palette... but the pervasive sense of inert boredom, which has been noted as a strength in the past, is difficult to shake." PopMatters gave it a score of five stars out of ten and said, "While it might be easy to point to the industry guy behind the boards, the album speaks for itself, and the Strokes managed to write a flop all by themselves."

"Heart in a Cage" was the album's second single, followed by "You Only Live Once". NME rated First Impressions of Earth at #8 in its Albums of the Year 2006 list.

=== Commercial ===
First Impressions of Earth entered the UK Albums Chart at number one, the Strokes' first album at the top spot. The album peaked at #4 in the US, with an entry sales week of 88,000 units, somewhat below the performance of its predecessors. In Canada, the album debuted at #3, selling just under 10,000 copies. As of October 2006, the album had sold 271,000 units in the US, and has received gold certification for sold over 500.000 units by RIAA in June 2021. Although the album was the band's first release to reach #1 on any chart worldwide, it is also the first not to reach UK platinum status, and spent much less time on the charts than the previous albums. However, it has still achieved gold sales in Australia. and UK.

== Track listing ==
All lyrics are written by Julian Casablancas; all music is composed by Casablancas, except where noted.

First Impressions of Earth track listing
No.	Title	Music	Length
1.	"You Only Live Once"		3:09
2.	"Juicebox"		3:17
3.	"Heart in a Cage"		3:27
4.	"Razorblade"		3:29
5.	"On the Other Side"		4:38
6.	"Vision of Division"	Casablancas; Nikolai Fraiture; Albert Hammond Jr.; Fabrizio Moretti; Nick Valensi	4:20
7.	"Ask Me Anything"	Casablancas; Valensi	3:12
8.	"Electricityscape"	Casablancas; Hammond Jr.	3:33
9.	"Killing Lies"	Casablancas; Fraiture	3:50
10.	"Fear of Sleep"		4:00
11.	"15 Minutes"		4:34
12.	"Ize of the World"		4:29
13.	"Evening Sun"	Casablancas; Moretti	3:06
14.	"Red Light"		3:11
Total length:			52:19

== Personnel ==
Personnel taken from First Impressions of Earth CD booklet, except where noted.

The Strokes

- Julian Casablancas – vocals, drums on "Evening Sun"
- Nick Valensi – guitar, Mellotron on "Ask Me Anything
- Albert Hammond, Jr. – guitar
- Nikolai Fraiture – bass guitar
- Fab Moretti – drums

Production

- David Kahne – producer (all tracks), engineer
- Gordon Raphael – producer ("Razorblade", "Electricityscape", and "Killing Lies")
- Andy Wallace – mixing
- Steve Sisco – assistant mixing engineer
- John O'Mahony – mix engineer ("15 Minutes")
- Howie Weinberg – mastering
- Bob Ludwig – mastering ("Killing Lies" and "Fear of Sleep")

Design

- Piero Fornasetti – disc artwork ("Strumenti Musicali", 1952)
- Lothar Quinte – cover art ("Ohne Titel", 1968)
- Günter Fruhtrunk – rear cover art ("Mathematik der Intuition", 1962)
- James Bellesini – album design for Love Police
- Dan Winters – photography

=== Artwork ===
The following artworks appear in the 32-page booklet included with the album:

"You Only Live Once"

- picture of lathanum aluminate by Professor Michael Davidson

"Juicebox"

- "Rocketship" (from cover of Fantastic Story Magazine's Summer 1952 issue) by Alex Schomburg

"Heart in a Cage"

- "The Brain" by Henry Groskinsky

"Razorblade"

- "Scout" by Richard Phillips

"On the Other Side"

- "Nativity", 13th CE by Guido da Siena
- "The Flayed Ox", 1655 by Rembrandt Harmensz van Rijn
- "Les Pantoufles, The Slippers" by Samuel van Hoogstraten
- "The Pieta of Saint-Germain-des-Prés", ca. 1500 by The Master of Saint-Germain-des-Prés

"Vision of Division"

- "The Continuous Monument", 1969 by Superstudio

"Ask Me Anything"

- music notes and "Yellow Room" courtesy of Milton Glaser

"Electricityscape"

- Image #BB1863 by John Foxx

"Killing Lies"

- Etoffe & Tapis Etrangers. Plate 19. by Benigno Crespi

"Fear of Sleep"

- West 83rd St., New York City, 1996 photo by Jeff Prant

"15 Minutes"

- "Lowe's Paradise Theater" by Henry Groskinsky

"Ize of the World"

- Gun Barrel Eyes image by Milton Glaser

"Red Light"

- "Leopard", 1967 by Mel Ramos

== Singles ==
Singles from First Impressions of Earth
Title	Information
"Juicebox"	Released: October 2005 (US), December 5, 2005 (UK); Chart positions: No. 5 (UK Singles Chart) No. 9 (US Modern Rock)
"Heart in a Cage"	Released: March 20, 2006 (UK), April 18, 2006 (Worldwide); Chart positions: No. 21 (US Modern Rock) No. 25 (UK Singles Chart)
"You Only Live Once"	Released: July 24, 2006 (Worldwide), September 26, 2006 (US); Chart positions: No. 35 (US Modern Rock)

== Charts ==
=== Weekly charts ===
Weekly chart performance for First Impressions of Earth
Chart (2006)	Peak position
Australian Albums (ARIA)	4
Austrian Albums (Ö3 Austria)	9
Belgian Albums (Ultratop Flanders)	21
Belgian Albums (Ultratop Wallonia)	26
Canadian Albums (Billboard)	3
Danish Albums (Hitlisten)	10
Dutch Albums (Album Top 100)	23
European Albums (Billboard)	4
Finnish Albums (Suomen virallinen lista)	10
French Albums (SNEP)	9
German Albums (Offizielle Top 100)	11
Irish Albums (IRMA)	3
Italian Albums (FIMI)	25
Mexican Albums (Top 100 Mexico)	8
New Zealand Albums (RMNZ)	10
Norwegian Albums (VG-lista)	22
Portuguese Albums (AFP)	22
Scottish Albums (Official Charts)	1
Spanish Albums (Promusicae)	30
Swedish Albums (Sverigetopplistan)	9
Swiss Albums (Schweizer Hitparade)	11
UK Albums (Official Charts)	1
UK Independent Albums (Official Charts)	1
US Billboard 200	4

=== Year-end charts ===
Year-end chart performance for First Impressions of Earth
Chart (2006)	Position
European Albums (Billboard)	73
French Albums (SNEP)	96
Mexican Albums (Top 100 Mexico)	66
UK Albums (OCC)	99

== Certifications ==
Certifications for First Impressions of Earth
Region	Certification	Certified units/sales
Australia (ARIA)	Gold	35,000^{^}
France (SNEP)	Gold	75,000^{*}
Japan (RIAJ)	Gold	100,000^{^}
New Zealand (RMNZ)	Gold	7,500^{‡}
United Kingdom (BPI)	Gold	100,000^{^}
United States (RIAA)	Gold	500,000^{‡}
^{*} Sales figures based on certification alone.^{^} Shipments figures based on certification alone.^{‡} Sales+streaming figures based on certification alone.
