= Taken for a Fool =

Single by the Strokes

from the album Angles
- Released: 1 July 2011
- Recorded: 2007–2010
- Length: 3:25
- Label: RCA; Rough Trade
- Songwriter: The Strokes
- Producers: Gus Oberg; The Strokes

The Strokes singles chronology
"Under Cover of Darkness" (2011)	"Taken for a Fool" (2011)	"One Way Trigger" (2013)

Music video
- "Taken for a Fool" on YouTube

"Taken for a Fool" is a song by American rock band the Strokes, and was written by the whole band. It is the second single for their fourth album, Angles, and was released as a 7" vinyl and digital download on July 1, 2011.

== Track listing ==
No.	Title	Length
1.	"Taken for a Fool"	3:25
2.	"Taken for a Fool (Live From Madison Square Garden) (feat. Elvis Costello)"	3:37

== Personnel ==
Credits taken from Angles liner notes.

The Strokes

- Julian Casablancas – vocals
- Nick Valensi – lead guitar
- Albert Hammond Jr. – rhythm guitar
- Nikolai Fraiture – bass guitar
- Fab Moretti – drums

Production

- Gus Oberg – production, engineering, recording
- The Strokes – production
- Joe Chiccarelli – additional production
- Noah Georgeson – mixing
- George Marino – mastering

== Music video ==
The music video for the song was released worldwide on July 8, 2011. The video was directed by Laurent Briet.

== Charts ==
Chart (2011)	Peak Position
Canada: Alternative Rock	47
