= Juicebox (song) =

2005 single by the Strokes

Single by the Strokes

from the album First Impressions of Earth
- B-side: "Hawaii"
- Released: October 3, 2005
- Studio: Red Carpet, New York City
- Genre: Punk rock
- Length: 3:17
- Label: RCA, Rough Trade
- Songwriter: Julian Casablancas
- Producer: David Kahne

The Strokes singles chronology
"The End Has No End" (2004)	"Juicebox" (2005)	"Heart in a Cage" (2006)

Music video
- "Juicebox" on YouTube

"Juicebox" is a song by American rock band the Strokes, released on October 3, 2005 as the lead single from the band's third studio album, First Impressions of Earth. It was written by singer Julian Casablancas, produced by David Kahne and released by RCA Records. In the United Kingdom and Australia, it was released in December.

The song reached No. 5 on the UK singles chart and No. 98 on the Billboard Hot 100 in the United States, making it the band's highest-charting song in both countries. It is also the only Strokes song to chart on the Hot 100.

== Background ==
In Spin, Casablancas said, "I remember people saying this track's ugly, I think it's got a great personality." The track was leaked long before its scheduled single release, forcing the band and managers to release it as a single in iTunes format earlier than planned. The B-side to the single is the song "Hawaii".

== Reception ==
Their first single in over a year, "Juicebox" marked the Strokes' second single to reach the Top 10 in the UK and also their highest charting single to date. The song also became their first and only single to chart the US Billboard Hot 100, at number 98. Although barely entering the main chart, it debuted at the top spot on the component chart for sales, staying within the top five for another week.

== Music video ==
The video for "Juicebox", directed by Michael Palmieri with cinematography by Christopher Doyle, features comedian David Cross as a DJ in a radio station in New York City. The video caused some controversy because it contained graphic sexual content, which caused Palmieri to heavily edit it so it would be less explicit.

== Track listings ==
All tracks are written by Julian Casablancas.

CD
No.	Title	Length
1.	"Juicebox"	3:17
2.	"Hawaii"	3:52
3.	"Juicebox (Live in Rio de Janeiro, Brazil)"	3:39
4.	"Juicebox (Uncut video)"	5:01

US 7-inch vinyl
No.	Title	Length
1.	"Juicebox"	3:17
2.	"Hawaii"	3:52
3.	"Juicebox (Live in Rio de Janeiro, Brazil)"	3:39

UK 7-inch vinyl
No.	Title	Length
1.	"Juicebox"	3:17
2.	"Hawaii"	3:52

== Personnel ==
Personnel taken from First Impressions of Earth CD booklet.

The Strokes

- Julian Casablancas – vocals
- Nick Valensi – guitar
- Albert Hammond Jr. – guitar
- Nikolai Fraiture – bass guitar
- Fab Moretti – drums

Production

- David Kahne – producer, engineer
- Andy Wallace – mixing
- Steve Sisco – assistant mixing engineer
- Howie Weinberg – mastering

== Charts ==
=== Weekly charts ===
Weekly chart performance for "Juicebox"
Chart (2005–2006)	Peak position
Australia (ARIA)	44
Canada (Nielsen SoundScan)	4
Canada Rock Top 30 (Radio & Records)	27
Europe (Eurochart Hot 100)	20
Germany (GfK)	100
Greece (IFPI Greece)	45
Ireland (IRMA)	18
Netherlands (Single Top 100)	98
Scottish Singles Sales (Official Charts)	7
Spain (Promusicae)	14
Sweden (Sverigetopplistan)	50
UK Singles (Official Charts)	5
UK Indie (Official Charts)	1
US Billboard Hot 100	98
US Alternative Airplay (Billboard)	9
US Pop 100 (Billboard)	65

=== Year-end charts ===
Year-end chart performance for "Juicebox"
Chart (2005)	Position
US Modern Rock Tracks (Billboard)	92

== Release history ==
Release dates and formats for "Juicebox"
Region	Date	Format(s)	Label(s)	Ref.
United States	October 3, 2005	Alternative radio	RCA	
United Kingdom	December 5, 2005	CD	Rough Trade	
Australia	December 12, 2005	CD	BMG	
