= Heart in a Cage =

2006 single by the Strokes

Single by The Strokes

from the album First Impressions of Earth
- B-side: "Life's a Gas"; "I'll Try Anything Once ("You Only Live Once" Demo)"
- Released: March 20, 2006
- Genre: Garage rock
- Length: 3:26
- Label: RCA
- Songwriter: Julian Casablancas
- Producer: David Kahne

The Strokes singles chronology
"Juicebox" (2005)	"Heart in a Cage" (2006)	"You Only Live Once" (2006)

"Heart in a Cage" is a song by American rock band the Strokes. Written by lead singer Julian Casablancas, the song was released as the second single from the band's third studio album, First Impressions of Earth (2006). It was released in the United Kingdom on March 20, 2006.

The CD1 version of the single featured their cover of Ramones' "Life's a Gas" (and contains parts of two other Ramones songs; "The KKK Took My Baby Away" and "Don't Go") as a B-side, while the CD2 version featured an early version of the song "You Only Live Once" (previously named "I'll Try Anything Once"), along with the single's music video. The 7" vinyl includes "I'll Try Anything Once", performed by Nick Valensi on the keyboard.

== Music video ==
The music video for "Heart in a Cage" was directed by Samuel Bayer, and was shot in New York City. It was shot in black and white and featured the band members playing in various locations in the city, such as on tall skyscrapers, or, in singer Julian Casablancas's case, lying down on the pavement.

== Track listings ==
CD1

1. "Heart in a Cage (Album Version)" - 3:26
2. "Life's a Gas (Ramones Cover)" - 3:07

CD2

1. "Heart in a Cage (Album Version)" - 3:26
2. "I'll Try Anything Once ("You Only Live Once" Demo)" - 3:15
3. "Heart in a Cage (Video)" - 3:26

7-inch vinyl

1. "Heart in a Cage" - 3:14
2. "I'll Try Anything Once ("You Only Live Once" Demo)" - 3:15

Japanese CD

1. "Heart in a Cage (Album Version)" - 3:26
2. "I'll Try Anything Once ("You Only Live Once" Demo)" - 3:15
3. "Life's a Gas (Ramones Cover)"
4. "Heart in a Cage (Video)" - 3:26

== Personnel ==
Personnel taken from First Impressions of Earth CD booklet.

The Strokes

- Julian Casablancas – vocals
- Nick Valensi – guitar
- Albert Hammond Jr. – guitar
- Nikolai Fraiture – bass guitar
- Fab Moretti – drums

Production

- David Kahne – producer, engineer
- Andy Wallace – mixing
- Steve Sisco – assistant mixing engineer
- Howie Weinberg – mastering

== Charts ==
Chart (2006)	Peak position
UK Singles (Official Charts)	25
UK Indie (Official Charts)	2
US Alternative Airplay (Billboard)	21
