= Angles (The Strokes album) =

2011 studio album by the Strokes

Studio album by The Strokes
- Released: March 22, 2011
- Recorded: July 2009 – December 2010
- Studios: Electric Lady, New York City; Avatar, New York City; One Way, Upstate New York
- Genres: Indie rock; post-punk revival; new wave; power pop; synth-pop
- Length: 34:27
- Label: RCA
- Producers: Joe Chiccarelli; Gus Oberg; The Strokes

The Strokes chronology
First Impressions of Earth (2005)	Angles (2011)	Comedown Machine (2013)

Singles from Angles
- 1. "Under Cover of Darkness" Released: February 9, 2011; 2. "Taken for a Fool" Released: July 1, 2011

Angles is the fourth studio album by American rock band The Strokes. It was released on March 22, 2011, through RCA Records, and the group's first album in over five years, following First Impressions of Earth (2005).

== Recording ==
After touring in support of First Impressions of Earth, the Strokes went on an extended hiatus in 2007 and then regrouped two years later to begin writing new material for a fourth album. The album took more than two years to materialize, with the band recording live demos of 18 songs before heading into Avatar Studios in New York with producer Joe Chiccarelli, but without frontman Julian Casablancas. Not long after recording began, however, the band became frustrated with both Chiccarelli's reserved production style and Casablancas' absence. Only one song from these recording sessions, "Life Is Simple in the Moonlight", remained in its original form on the album's track listing. The rest of the songs were either scrapped or reworked by the band with engineer Gus Oberg at guitarist Albert Hammond Jr.'s home studio in Port Jervis, Upstate New York.

While Casablancas’ disengagement may have been by design, guitarist Nick Valensi found the whole experience deeply dissatisfying. "I won’t do the next album if we make it like this. No way. It was awful– just awful. Working in a fractured way, not having a singer there. I’d show up certain days and do guitar takes by myself, just me and the engineer." He added that most of Casablancas' ideas and suggestions were written "in really vague terms" and then sent to the band by email, leaving the others without much to go on. In an interview with Pitchfork, Casablancas stated: "When I'm there, people might wait for me to say something. I think it took me being a little mute to force the initiative".

These stories and reports stating the album was written separately by the band from Casablancas however, were untrue. The vocals were indeed recorded separately by Casablancas, but they were written together, in session, with the rest of the band present. Casablancas later said, "The funny thing about Angles is there was all that weird talk about recording it separately. We just had dinner in L.A. and we were all talking about it. And they forget that we sat in a room in a studio and were writing songs forever. That's where we did the whole record. All the parts, the songs, in a room, together. We recorded them with two mics, and that was the foundation, and then we were going to go track the official recording. That's when they went and recorded stuff, and when the 'Julian wasn't there,' BS or whatever [started]. That was just because logistically, we'd never done a record like that".

Hammond's drug abuse and resulting rehab — stemming from his breakup with model Agyness Deyn — was another hurdle the band faced during the album's production, as he missed early recording sessions.

== Musical style ==
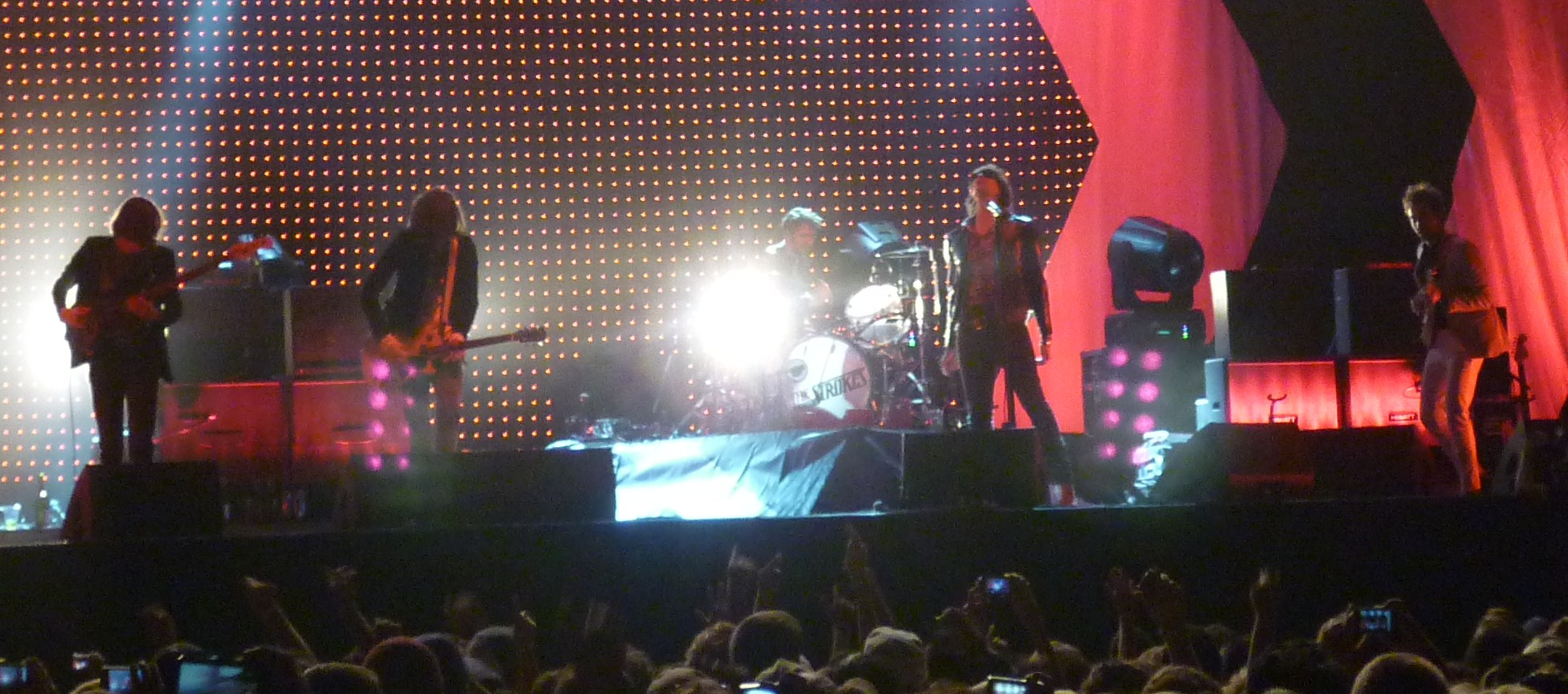
The Strokes at Austin City Limits Festival in 2010

Speaking to Zane Lowe, bassist Nikolai Fraiture stated that he felt Angles would be "a return to the basics", suggesting the songs would be of similar style to their acclaimed 2001 debut record, Is This It. He added, "Sonically, I feel it's the album which should have been made between Room on Fire and First Impressions of Earth". However, the band decided to experiment with various production techniques, including MIDI electronic samples. Producer Gus Oberg claimed that despite wanting to use MIDI, neither he nor the band were satisfied with the results, and instead used a number of keyboards, with every member of the band playing the same parts manually instead for at least one song each. These included mainly the Roland Juno-106, as well as the MicroKORG XL, a Wurlitzer electric piano, and a Farfisa organ. The band also utilised a number of guitar pedals, more so than previously, including the Maxon AD999 delay, the Electro‑Harmonix Memory Man, and various Green Rhino distortion pedals. Oberg would record the digital guitar tracks onto tape, using a TEAC quarter‑inch tape machine during tracking sessions, before re-recording them back to digital for mixing, in order to gain a more analogue sound. He also used the machine to achieve a slap‑back echo on the drum track for 'Gratisfaction'. The band also made extensive use of overdubbed guitars, and various vocal techniques, such as backing vocals for the first time, vocal harmonies, and vocal layering techniques, including double tracking, all of which are most notable on "Under Cover of Darkness".

== Singles ==
The first single to promote Angles, "Under Cover of Darkness", was released on February 9, 2011. The 7" was officially released on March 1, 2011 and contained "You're So Right" as the B-side. The second single, "Taken for a Fool", was released on July 1, 2011. A live version of the track, recorded during an April 1, 2011 concert at Madison Square Garden and featuring Elvis Costello, was made available as the single's accompanying B-side. The song "Machu Picchu" appears on the soundtrack for EA Sports video game, FIFA 12. and was released as the third single on August 8, 2011.

== Reception ==
Professional ratings
Aggregate scores
Source	Rating
AnyDecentMusic?	6.5/10
Metacritic	71/100
Review scores
Source	Rating
AllMusic	3.5/5 stars
The A.V. Club	B+
Entertainment Weekly	B−
The Guardian	2/5 stars
The Independent	3/5 stars
NME	3.5/5 stars
Pitchfork	5.9/10
PopMatters	6/10
Rolling Stone	4/5 stars
Spin	8/10

=== Critical ===
Media response to Angles was generally favorable; aggregating website Metacritic reports a normalized rating of 71, based on 41 reviews. In his four-star review, David Fricke of Rolling Stone explained that the record was "worth the wait", and summed it up as "the first step away from the sound of their instant-classic debut. Instead of the rigid purity of 'Is This It,' the new album nods to the more expansive sound of the Velvet Underground's 1970 record, Loaded." Other critics praised Angles as a welcome reinvention for the band, with NME noting that it "lives up to its name by coming at you from some very obtuse places." Claire Suddath of Time called the album "a 10 song exercise in rock precision," and Mikael Wood of Spin proclaimed that it "reminds you why they were so irresistible in the first place". Amanda Petrusich of Entertainment Weekly gave the album a B−, describing it as "accordingly fractured and often inscrutable, but (with) returns to form."

=== Commercial ===
Angles entered the Australian albums chart at number one, the Strokes' first time at the top spot within the country and the second time such a feat has occurred thus far in the band's career. Meanwhile, it reached number four in the US with an entry sales week of 89,000 units, 1,000 more than that of its predecessor, First Impressions of Earth. As of 2012 it has sold 213,000 copies in the United States.

== Track listing ==
All tracks are written by the Strokes.

Angles track listing
No.	Title	Length
1.	"Machu Picchu"	3:32
2.	"Under Cover of Darkness"	3:57
3.	"Two Kinds of Happiness"	3:44
4.	"You're So Right"	2:34
5.	"Taken for a Fool"	3:25
6.	"Games"	3:52
7.	"Call Me Back"	3:03
8.	"Gratisfaction"	2:59
9.	"Metabolism"	3:05
10.	"Life Is Simple in the Moonlight"	4:15
Total length:		34:27

== Personnel ==
Credits taken from Angles liner notes, and per Gus Oberg.

The Strokes

- Julian Casablancas – vocals, keyboards
- Nick Valensi – lead guitar, keyboards, backing vocals
- Albert Hammond Jr. – rhythm guitar, keyboards
- Nikolai Fraiture – bass guitar, keyboards
- Fab Moretti – drums, percussion, keyboards, backing vocals

Design

- Album cover painting by Guy Pouppez, courtesy of his daughter
- Album design by Lizzie Nanut

Production

- Published by The Strokes Band Music (ASCAP)
- Produced by Gus Oberg and The Strokes
- Additional production by Joe Chiccarelli
  - "Under Cover of Darkness", "Gratisfaction" and "Two Kinds of Happiness" produced by Gus Oberg, The Strokes and Joe Chiccarelli
  - "Life Is Simple in the Moonlight" produced by Joe Chiccarelli and The Strokes
- Mixed by Noah Georgeson
  - "Under Cover of Darkness" and "Gratisfaction" mixed by Noah Georgeson and Gus Oberg
- Engineered and recorded by Gus Oberg at One Way Studios and Electric Lady Studios
- Assistant engineered by Justin Gerrish
  - "Under Cover of Darkness" and "Gratisfaction" recorded at Avatar Studios, One Way Studios and Electric Lady Studios
  - "Life Is Simple in the Moonlight" and "Two Kinds of Happiness" recorded by Gus Oberg and Joe Chiccarelli at Avatar Studios, One Way Studios and Electric Lady Studios
- Mastered by George Marino at Sterling Sound, New York City

== Charts ==
=== Weekly charts ===
Weekly chart performance for Angles
Chart (2011)	Peak position
Australian Albums (ARIA)	1
Austrian Albums (Ö3 Austria)	9
Belgian Albums (Ultratop Flanders)	18
Belgian Albums (Ultratop Wallonia)	17
Canadian Albums (Billboard)	4
Danish Albums (Hitlisten)	18
Dutch Albums (Album Top 100)	23
Finnish Albums (Suomen virallinen lista)	31
French Albums (SNEP)	6
German Albums (Offizielle Top 100)	15
Irish Albums (IRMA)	3
Italian Albums (FIMI)	20
Mexican Albums (AMPROFON)	5
New Zealand Albums (RMNZ)	6
Norwegian Albums (VG-lista)	15
Portuguese Albums (AFP)	3
Scottish Albums (Official Charts)	3
Spanish Albums (Promusicae)	4
Swedish Albums (Sverigetopplistan)	21
Swiss Albums (Schweizer Hitparade)	6
UK Albums (Official Charts)	3
US Billboard 200	4
US Top Alternative Albums (Billboard)	1
US Top Rock Albums (Billboard)	1
US Indie Store Album Sales (Billboard)	6

=== Year-end charts ===
Year-end chart performance for Angles
Chart (2011)	Position
Australian Albums (ARIA)	93
Mexican Albums (Top 100 Mexico)	100
UK Albums (OCC)	129
US Billboard 200	192
US Top Rock Albums (Billboard)	36

== Certifications and sales ==
Certifications for Angles
Region	Certification	Certified units/sales
Australia (ARIA)	Platinum	70,000^{‡}
United Kingdom (BPI)	Gold	170,000
^{‡} Sales+streaming figures based on certification alone.
