= Paradise Theater (Bronx) =

Theater in the Bronx, New York

Loew's Paradise Theatre
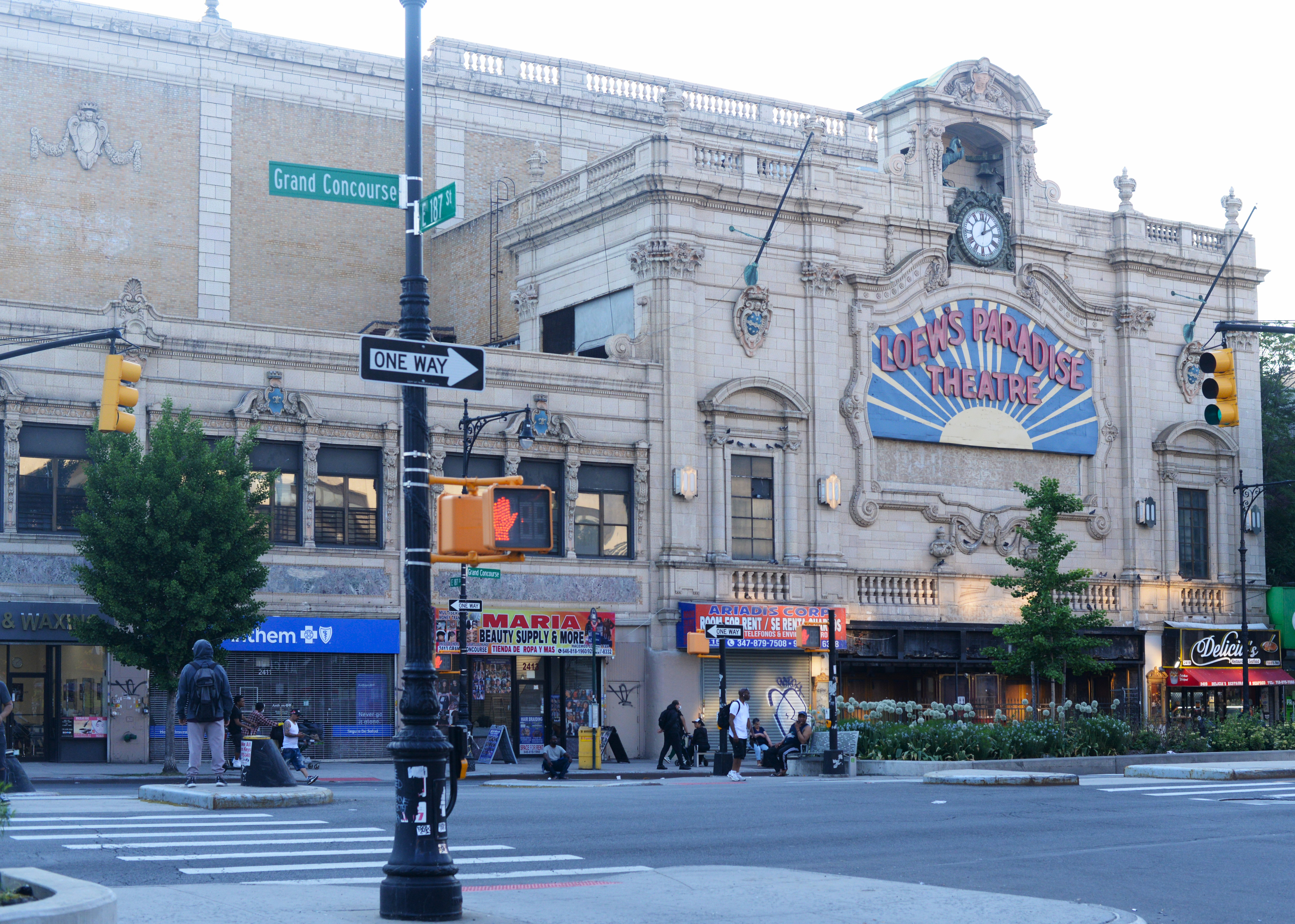
- The theater viewed from across the Grand Concourse
- Interactive map of Loew's Paradise Theatre
- Address: 2403 Grand Concourse; Bronx, New York; United States
- Coordinates: 40°51′38″N 73°53′56″W
- Owner: The First Paradise Theaters Corp.
- Capacity: 3,885
- Type: Atmospheric theatre
- Current use: Church

Construction
- Opened: September 7, 1929
- Rebuilt: 1970s, 1981, 2000s
- Years active: 1929–1994, 2005–2020
- Architect: John Eberson

New York City Landmark
- Designated: April 15, 1997
- Reference no.: 1891
- Designated entity: Exterior

New York City Landmark
- Designated: May 16, 2006
- Reference no.: 2193
- Designated entity: Lobbies and auditorium interior

The Paradise Theater (formerly the Loew's Paradise Theatre) is a theater at 2403 Grand Concourse in the Fordham neighborhood of the Bronx in New York City, New York, US. Designed by John Eberson as a movie palace, it opened on September 7, 1929, as one of five Loew's Wonder Theatres in the New York City area. Although the building is no longer in use as a movie theater, its facade and interior are preserved as New York City designated landmarks.

The Paradise Theater is composed of a lobby wing and a retail wing facing the Grand Concourse to the east, as well as an auditorium wing facing Creston Avenue to the west. The theater has an ornate terracotta facade on the Grand Concourse, with a multicolored Baroque–style frontispiece. The main facade originally also included a mechanical Seth Thomas clock and a sculpture of Saint George fighting a fire-breathing dragon. The other facades are simpler and made of brick. There are an outer lobby, foyer, and main lobby on the ground level, which are decorated with murals and sculptures. On the second story are a promenade, lounges, and balcony lobbies. The auditorium has 3,855 seats on two levels, with an elaborately decorated proscenium arch, walls, and ceilings. Like the other Wonder Theatres, the Paradise Theater featured a "Wonder Morton" theater pipe organ manufactured by the Robert Morton Organ Company, though the organ has since been removed.

A subsidiary of Paramount-Publix first acquired land for the theater in 1925, and Loew's Theatres took over the site in 1927. The Paradise Theater originally presented films and live shows. but the live shows were discontinued within five years of the theater's opening. The theater slowly declined after World War II, and the auditorium was subdivided three times in the 1970s and 1980s, becoming a multiplex with four screening rooms. The Paradise Theater closed in 1994 and was shuttered for over a decade. Following an unsuccessful renovation attempt led by Richard P. DeCesare, the theater was sold in 2003 to Gerald Lieblich, who completed the renovation. The theater reopened in 2005 as an event venue, and it was sold twice in the next four years. The Paradise was then leased in 2012 to the World Changers Church International New York, a local congregation, which vacated it in 2020. Plans to convert it to an arts center were announced in 2026.

== Description ==
The Paradise Theater is located at 2403 Grand Concourse in the Fordham neighborhood of the Bronx in New York City, New York, US. The theater was one of five Loew's Wonder Theatres in the New York City area, along with the Jersey Theatre in Jersey City, the 175th Street Theatre in Manhattan, the Valencia Theatre in Queens, and the Kings Theatre in Brooklyn. The Paradise and Valencia, along with the Lane Theater on Staten Island, are the only atmospheric theaters in New York City designed by John Eberson. Similarly to the Valencia Theatre, the Paradise is decorated in a Spanish style. The Paradise was also one of the last atmospheric theaters to be built.

The site covers about 39,000 square feet (3,600 m^{2}). It measures 225 feet (69 m) along the Grand Concourse to the east, 215 feet (66 m) along Creston Avenue to the west. The depth between the Grand Concourse and Creston Avenue facades is variously cited as 174 feet (53 m) or 175 feet (53 m). The structure is divided into a three-story lobby section at the northeast corner of the site; a two-story retail section on the eastern edge of the site, south of the lobby section; and a three-story auditorium section on the western half of the site. The site is close to the Fordham Road station of the New York City Subway's Concourse Line (served by the B and D trains).

=== Facade ===
==== Grand Concourse ====
On the Grand Concourse, the lobby section is accessed by a wide doorway, and there are storefronts on either side of the doorway. The doors are recessed from the street, and there is an open-air vestibule in front of the doors. The vestibule has marble walls with sign boards, in addition to a coffered ceiling. Above the wide doorway, a marquee formerly showed the names of films that were being screened at the Paradise. At the time of the theater's construction, zoning restrictions prohibited Loew's from adding a vertical sign there.

Above the doorway is a two-story-high Baroque–style frontispiece. The frontispiece is made of architectural terracotta, which is mostly cream-colored with blue and salmon-pink accents, and is topped by a curved pediment. The frontispiece includes a blue-and-cream panel with a sunburst motif and the words "Loew's Paradise Theater" in all-capital neon letters. On either side of the frontispiece are engaged pilasters in the Corinthian order, which separate the frontispiece from the side bays. Each of the side bays has a window with a balustrade, engaged columns, and a segmentally-arched pediment; there is also a cartouche with a flagpole above the pediment. Above the third story, there is a cornice, which consists of a parapet above the frontispiece and balustrades above the outer bays. The parapet has pedestals with urns, as well as a niche above the center bay. The niche includes a mechanical Seth Thomas clock. There was originally also a sculpture of Saint George on horseback, fighting a fire-breathing dragon; the Saint George sculpture moved every hour, slashing the dragon's neck. The sculptures of the dragon and Saint George have since been stolen, but Saint George's horse remains intact. There is air-conditioning equipment on the lobby section's roof.

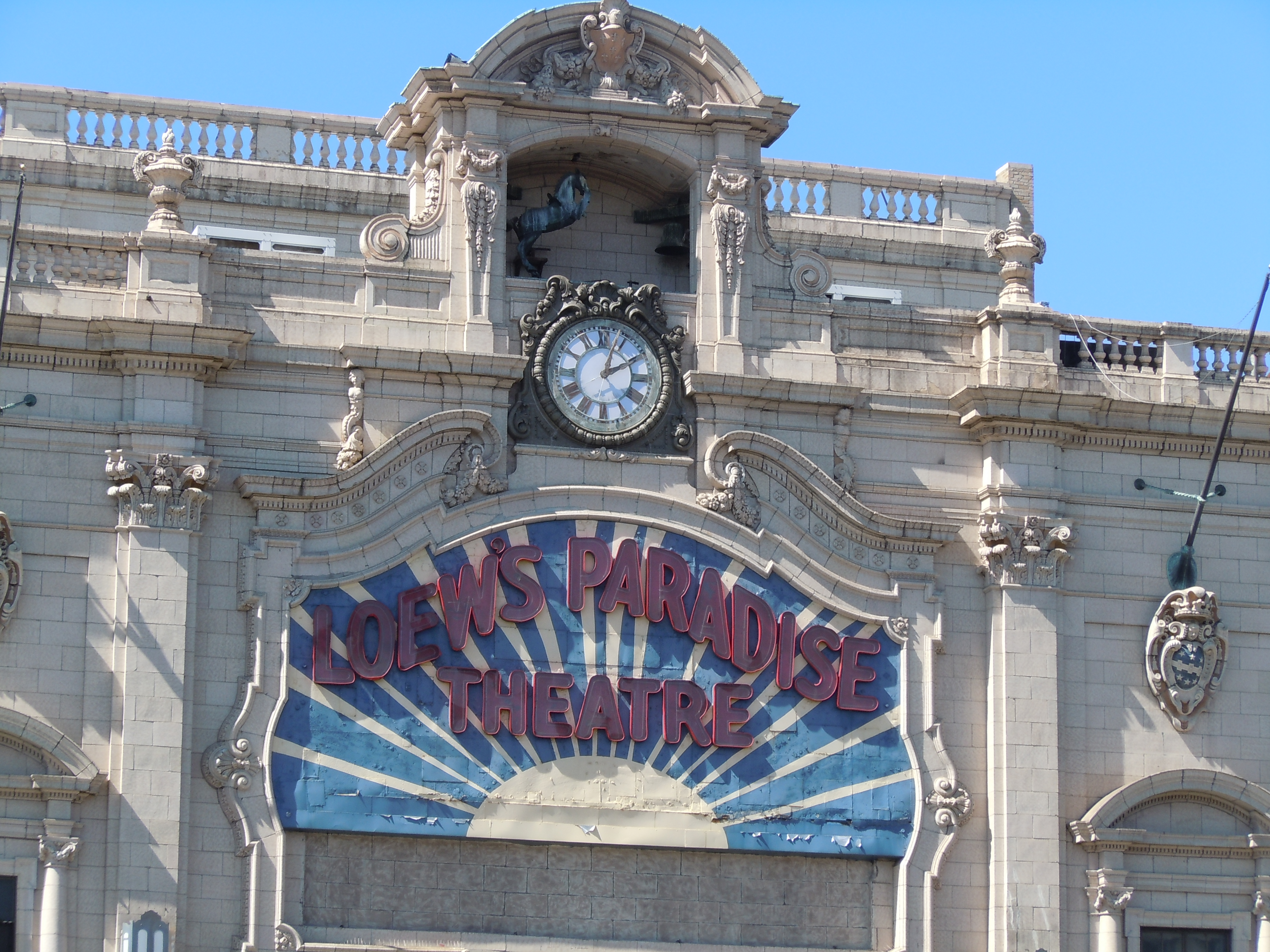
Frontispiece

To the south (left) of the lobby section is the two-story retail section, which is divided vertically into six bays and has a terracotta facade. The first-floor opening of the southernmost bay leads to an emergency stairway; there are corbels at both of the top corners of that opening. The rest of the first-floor openings have storefronts. In addition, there are ornamental marble panels above the first-story bays. On the second story of the retail section, each bay has a triple window, which is surrounded by a cream-colored terracotta frame with blue and salmon-pink accents. There are brackets flanking each window opening, which are decorated with bellflowers, jesters' heads, and swags. These brackets support cornices above each triple window, and there is a broken pediment above the central pane of each triple window. In addition, the bays are separated by pilasters, and there are cartouches with protruding shells and swags at the top of each pilaster. A cornice with dentils, as well as a parapet, run horizontally above the second story.

==== Other elevations ====
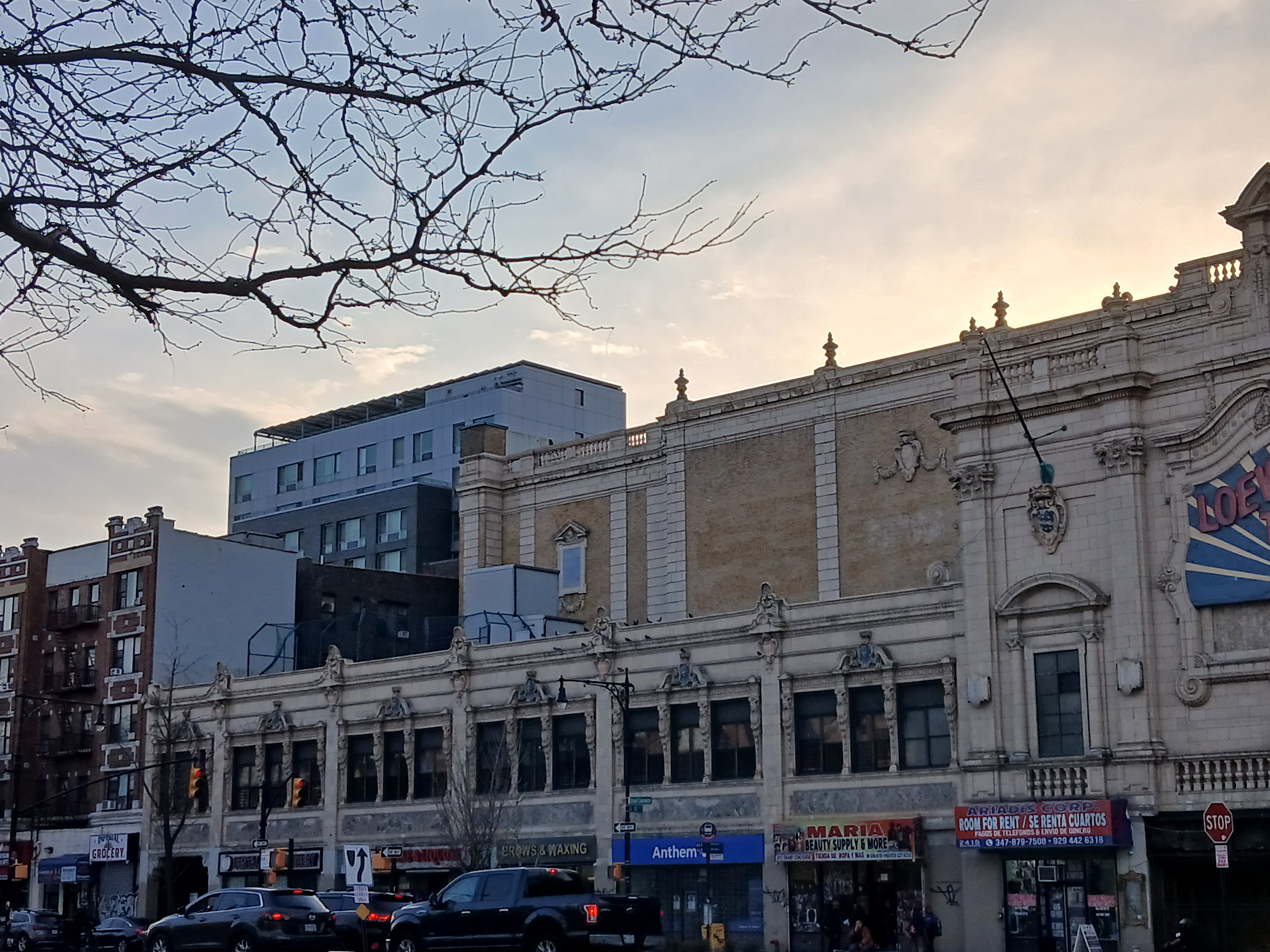
Retail wing

Behind the retail wing, the third story of the auditorium's eastern elevation is visible. The facade is clad with ocher and buff brick laid in Flemish bond, and there are quoins made of terracotta. There is a blind opening with a terracotta frame on the wall, in addition to a cartouche with swags, a cornice made of terracotta, and a parapet with urns and balustrades. The southern wall of the lobby section has a cream-colored terracotta facade, while the northern wall of the lobby section has a red-and-ocher brick wall.

On Creston Avenue, the first floor of the auditorium has an ocher-and-buff-brick facade laid in Flemish bond; the bricks are laid in a pattern resembling a rusticated stonework facade. Above the first story is a horizontal band course made of terracotta. The upper stories are also made of ocher-and-buff brick and are divided into five bays. Three of the bays have blind arches with terracotta frames; the bricks in these archways are laid in a diaper pattern, with protruding bricks that form diagonal lines. The spandrels, above the corners of each arch, have roundels made of marble. The other two bays each consist of three rectangular panels, the perimeters of which contain protruding bricks. The center panels of either bay have terracotta cartouches with swags and jesters' heads, as well as acroteria above the roofline. Atop the Creston Avenue facade is a terracotta band course with dentils, as well as a brick parapet.

=== Interior ===
The Paradise Theater's interior spaces cover roughly 45,000 square feet (4,200 m^{2}) and have an L-shaped layout. (Note: For detailed diagrams of the interiors, refer to Landmarks Preservation Commission 1997, pp. 16–18.) There are four levels; the ground story, the second story (at the bottom of the auditorium's balcony), the third-story mezzanine, and the top of the balcony. The interiors are designed in an Italian Baroque style, although Eberson was not inspired by any specific building. In general, the interior spaces are decorated in a red color palette, and they use woodwork extensively. Eberson had decided to use the Baroque style because, when the theater was being developed, it was supposed to be known as the Venetian.

The auditorium proper is accessed by three separate spaces: the outer lobby, foyer, and main lobby. The lobbies are oriented east to west, with the entrance to the east, and the main lobby to the west and perpendicular to the auditorium. Because the auditorium was located at the western or rear end of the site, on Creston Avenue, this freed up space for storefronts to the east, along the Grand Concourse. Each of the spaces uses different materials and decorations. Proceeding from east to west, the lobby spaces progressively become narrower. Exit-only stairs and passageways lead from the auditorium to either Creston Avenue or the Grand Concourse.

==== Ground-story spaces ====
The entrance on the Grand Concourse leads directly to a rectangular, double-height outer lobby. The outer lobby's floor is made of rubber and is covered with mats, while the plaster walls are painted orange. The east wall has six pairs of doors leading to the Grand Concourse, above which is a loggia with five arches supported by intertwined pilasters and columns. The outer lobby's north and south walls are each three bays wide, and there is a railing on the north wall. The center bay on either wall has a display case made of brass, above which is a balcony and a portico, while the outer bays have stone decorations. The west wall has five pairs of doors leading to the foyer, above which is a portico with shells and twisted columns. The coffered ceiling is made of plaster and is painted in a green and brown-red color scheme; a chandelier hangs from the ceiling. There are three statues on the east, south, and west walls, and a bust of Benjamin Franklin on the south wall. The statue in the entrance lobby are likely inspired by a niche in Rome's Santa Maria della Vittoria.

The lower foyer is located between the outer lobby on the east and the main lobby on the west. The space is rectangular, with painted-plaster walls, in addition to doorways with wood moldings. The south wall includes a door to the easternmost aisle of the auditorium's orchestra level, which is topped by statues of a man and woman. The north wall has an elevator and staircase ascending to the promenade and upper foyer on the second story. The lower foyer has a low wooden ceiling decorated with moldings, as well as an oval mural at its center, which was painted by David Jermann in 1999. The lower foyer leads to the main lobby, another double-height space, to its west. A pair of pillars separate the lower foyer and main lobby.

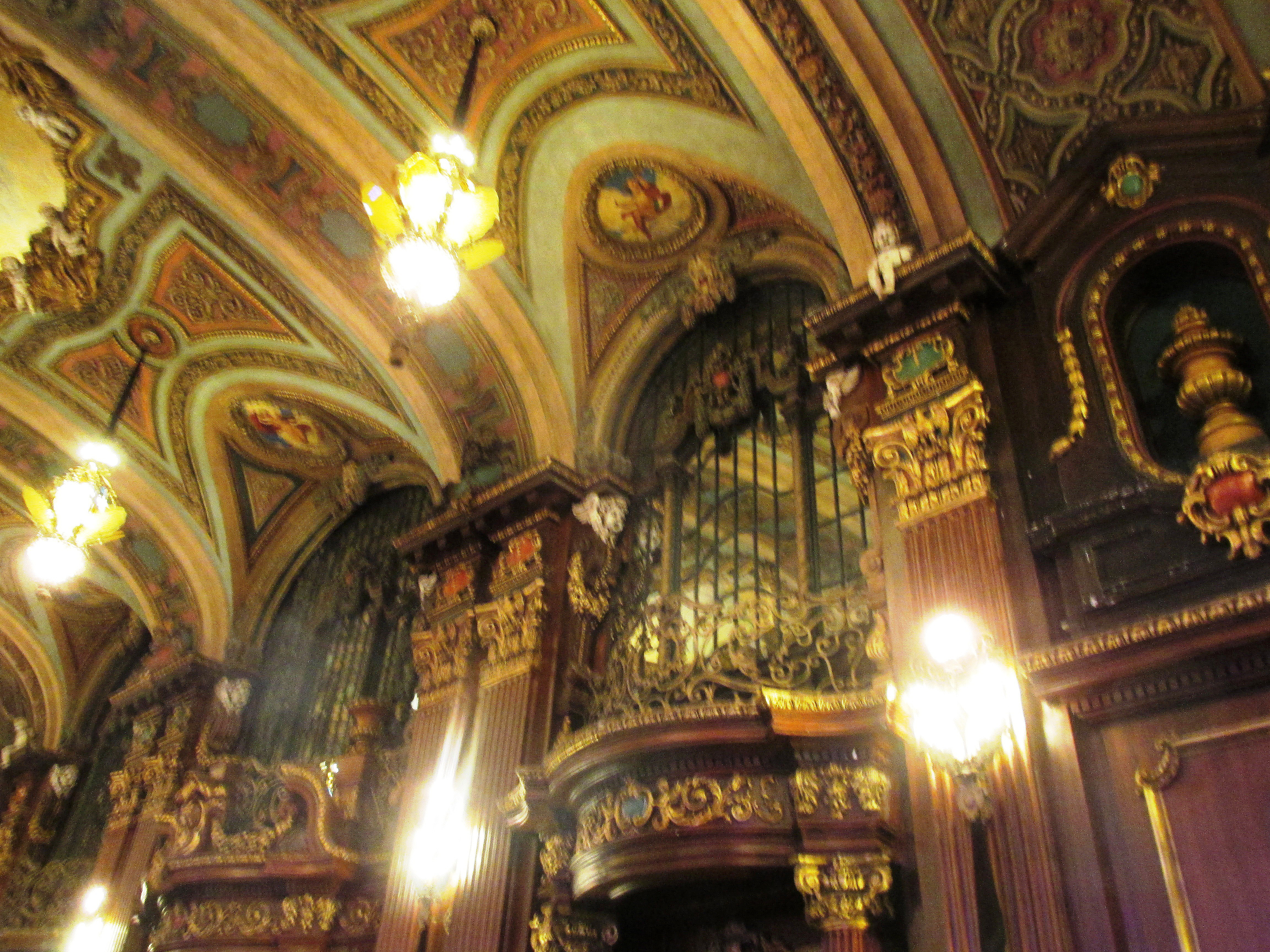
North wall and ceiling of the main lobby

The main lobby is at the western end of the site and is decorated with wood paneling. Its south wall is divided into five bays, of which three contain doorways to the auditorium's orchestra level. The north wall has three bays, and there is a pedestal with putti and fish in the center bay. On the second story, there are iron balconettes in the north-wall bays and the three middle bays of the south wall. The west wall is three bays wide and has a stair ascending to the promenade. The landing at the bottom of the stairs (in the northernmost bay of the west wall) has an emergency exit, while a wide passage under the stairs (in the southernmost bay) leads to the auditorium's westernmost aisle and an emergency-exit stairway. The north and south walls and the vaulted ceiling feature murals by the Hungarian artists Lajos Szanto and Andrew Karoly. There are nine murals in total—six on the walls and three on the ceiling—which are framed by scallops and cherubs. The murals depict personifications of sound, story, and film, floating in clouds. Light fixtures are mounted on the north and south walls and on the ceiling. There was a goldfish pool on the north wall, which was removed and replaced in 2006 with a concession stand.

==== Promenade, parlors, and balcony lobbies ====
The promenade, on the second story, runs west–east along the rear of the auditorium, just south of the main lobby. The eastern end of the promenade connects with an upper foyer, which is immediately above the lower foyer and functions as a bar. The north walls of the promenade and upper foyer are accessed, respectively, by the stairways from the lobby and the lower foyer. The south wall of the promenade leads to the women's lounge (on the west) and the men's lounge (on the east). Both the promenade and upper foyer have plaster walls with black-marble wainscoting, wood trim, and gilded friezes and moldings. Both spaces have a shallow vaulted ceilings with scrollwork, cartouches, and coffers. There are lamps on the wall and ceiling, as well as illuminated signs above the doorways to the lounges.

The ladies' and men's parlors both consist of a foyer and a washroom. The ladies' lounge was designed in a French style, which Eberson said was intended to be "dainty and graceful", while the men's parlor was fitted in a "heavier, sturdier" English style. The foyer and washroom in the ladies' lounge have a marble floor, as well as painted-plaster walls and ceilings, which are decorated with moldings. An arch separates the ladies' foyer and washroom, and there are also wall sconces and a ceiling cartouche in the ladies' foyer. The men's foyer has wooden walls and ceiling, a tile floor, and a ceiling chandelier.

Staircases on the promenade's and upper foyer's south walls ascend to two small lobbies on the third story, one each to the west and east, which are connected to each other. These lobbies, in turn, have further stairways ascending to the auditorium's upper balcony level. Both lobbies have plaster walls with moldings and elaborate arches, in addition to decorative ceilings with moldings, rosette motifs, and light bulbs. The hallway between the lobbies has walls with wooden pilasters, as well as a vaulted ceiling with moldings and overhanging light bulbs. Additionally, the foyer elevator ascends to an escalator lobby on the fourth floor, at the auditorium's northeastern corner and above the upper foyer. Three glass-paneled doors lead from the upper elevator lobby to the auditorium's upper balcony.

==== Auditorium ====
The auditorium has 3,855 seats as of 2012, though older sources cite the theater as having had about 3,885 or 3,953 seats. The seats are spread across a parterre-level orchestra and a balcony level. The balcony is cantilevered over the orchestra to improve sightlines from the orchestra seats. The side walls, on the west and east, narrow toward the front (south) end of the auditorium, giving the space a wedge shape.

Both the orchestra level and the balcony are raked, sloping down toward the front of the stage, though the balcony has a steeper slope than the orchestra level. Two aisles on the east and west sides of the orchestra level extend from the rear to the front; they are not connected by any cross-aisles. The orchestra-level aisles lead to five doors on the north wall, which lead from the main lobby and lower foyer. The balcony level has three cross-aisles—one at the rear and two in the middle—which divide the balcony seats into rear (upper), center, and front (lower) sections. A projection room is located behind the rear cross-aisle. In addition to two pairs of stairs leading from the balcony to the promenade, there is a door leading to the upper elevator lobby.

===== Design features =====
The design of the auditorium was intended to give the impression of an Italian courtyard or piazza. Many of the decorations are made of plaster, including the arches, columns, caryatids, facades, statues, and urns. These decorations, along with plaster foliage and birds, were intended to contribute to the outdoor courtyard–like ambience. The dark-blue coved ceiling is made of painted plaster and extends from the rear to the front. The ceiling also depicts constellations as they appeared when Loew's founder Marcus Loew was born. These constellations are composed of tiny lights in the ceiling, which are designed to give the appearance of stars. The design of the coved ceiling, combined with the auditorium's wedge shape, was intended to disperse sound throughout the auditorium. There was also a cloud machine, which generated cloud-like mists that moved across the ceiling.

On the auditorium's southern wall is a proscenium arch. There is a curved sounding board along the proscenium arch, which has decorative moldings and a Baroque–style oval mural at its center. The side walls of the proscenium arch include niches with caryatids and twisted columns on either side. There is a statue and coffered ceilings within each of the side niches, as well as frames with broken pediments beneath each niche. A balustrade runs above the arch, stepping up toward the center; the balustrade is divided into sections by pillars with urns. Above the center of the proscenium arch is a niche flanked by urns and reclining statues. The auditorium originally was a single-screen theater, with a wide screen similar to those in the other Wonder Theatres.

The southernmost portions of both side walls are divided vertically into three bays. The center bays on both walls have the most decoration and include arches, columns, reliefs, and moldings. In addition, there is an exit in the center bay of the western wall, to the right of the seating area. There are Corinthian pilasters and broken pediments in the outer bays of the eastern (left) wall, above which are circular windows with garlands. Below the balcony, both of the orchestra level's side walls have arches with columns, and there are groin-vaulted ceilings above each aisle. The west wall also has two statues, as well as putti and busts above the arches on the orchestra level. Each wall had unique decorative details, and there were trees, vines, and stuffed pigeons on the walls. The balcony's underside consists of a coved ceiling with moldings; in turn, these moldings divide the ceiling into rectangular panels with reliefs. The auditorium is mostly illuminated by recessed and indirect lights. The spaces are illuminated by lamps on the walls, in the side aisles, and above the stage.

===== Organ =====
Like the other Wonder Theatres, the Loew's Paradise Theatre featured a "Wonder Morton" theater pipe organ manufactured by the Robert Morton Organ Company. The organ featured a console with 4 manuals and 23 ranks of pipes; the organ console had originally been intended for the Loew's Jersey Theatre but was accidentally installed in the Paradise instead. The Paradise's organ was moved in 1997 to the Loew's Jersey Theatre, where it was rededicated in 2007. Though no longer in its original location, the Paradise's organ is the only Wonder Morton still being used at a Wonder Theatre.

== History ==
Movie palaces became common in the 1920s between the end of World War I and the beginning of the Great Depression. In the New York City area, only a small number of operators were involved in the construction of movie palaces. These theaters' designers included the legitimate-theater architects Thomas W. Lamb, C. Howard Crane, and John Eberson. By the late 1920s, numerous movie palaces were being developed in outlying neighborhoods in New York City; previously, the city's movie palaces had been concentrated in Midtown Manhattan. The five Wonder Theatres were developed by Loew's Inc., which at the time was competing with Paramount-Publix. In 1927, Loew's president Nicholas Schenck agreed to take over five sites from Paramount-Publix, in exchange for agreeing not to build competing theaters in Chicago; these five sites became the Wonder Theatres.

=== Development ===
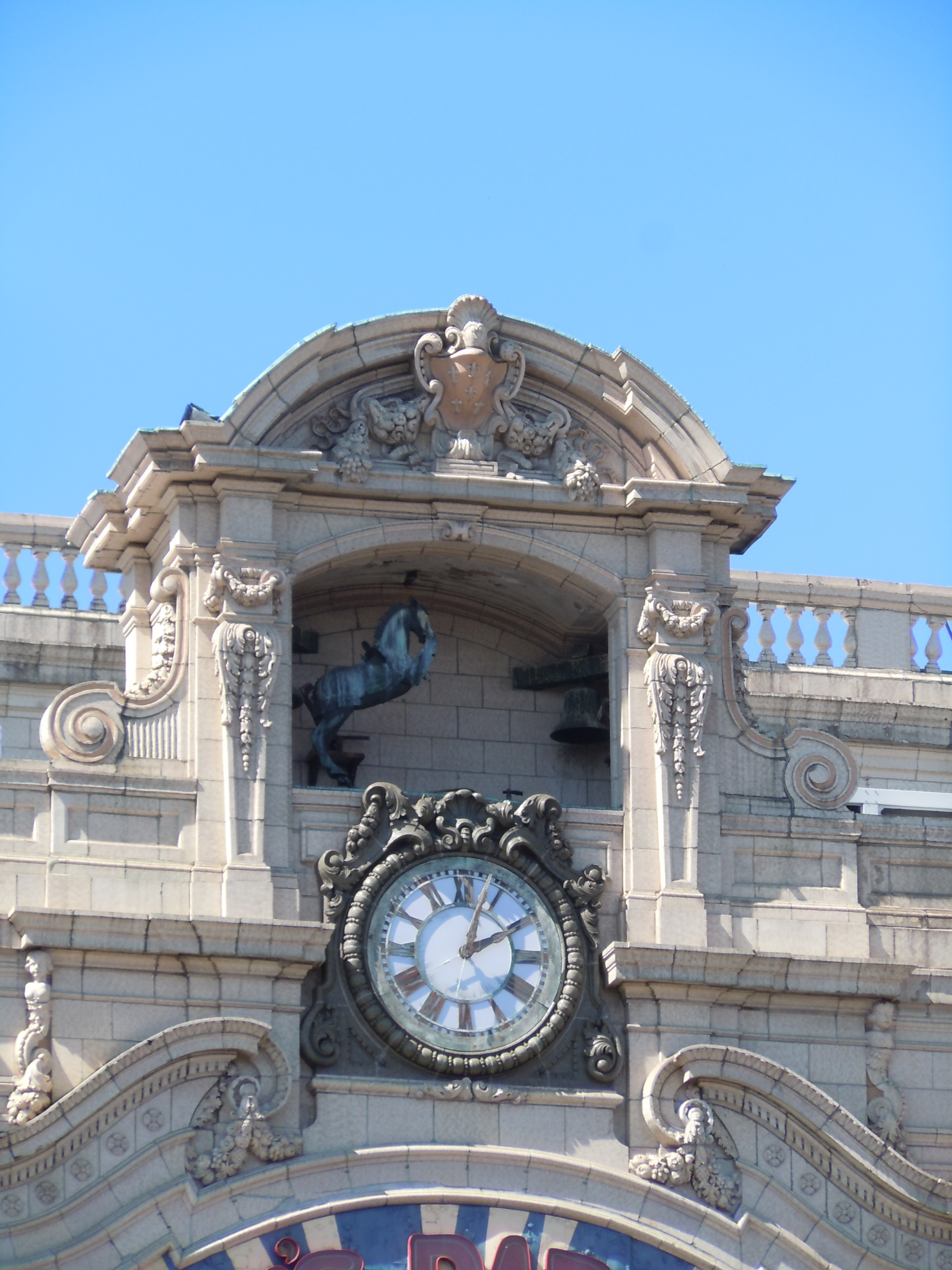
Clock atop the theater

The Hewitt Place Corporation, a subsidiary of Paramount-Publix, first acquired land on the Grand Concourse in late 1925 with the intention of developing a theater there. At the time, there were several other theaters nearby. The corporation claimed that the new theater would bring a piece of "Broadway to the Bronx". Hewitt bought several two-story houses at 2398–2406 Creston Avenue, immediately to the west, in February 1926. The company initially intended to erect a nine-story apartment building there. In March 1927, Paramount-Publix announced that it would build a theater near Fordham Road and the Grand Concourse. The theater was one of nine that Paramount-Publix planned to develop in outlying New York City neighborhoods, though the company later dropped plans for four of the other theaters. John Eberson, who was hired to design the theater, reportedly spent one year planning the interior.

Eberson submitted plans to the New York City Department of Buildings in May 1927 for a $1.8 million movie theater and office building facing the Grand Concourse and Creston Avenue, near 184th Street. The structure was to be erected by the Hewitt Place Corporation and Crestwood Realty Corporation. Publix hired Maurice Muller and William Russell Root to operate the 4,000-seat theater there. The venue was tentatively known as the Venetian during planning, and its facade was designed in a Venetian Gothic style. Due to the residential zoning on Creston Avenue, Publix had contemplated constructing an apartment building there. The city government denied Publix permission to construct the theater that June, following protests from local residents. Hewitt acquired a property at 2403 Grand Concourse from Samuel Kronsky and the Herman A. Acker Corporation in December 1927. Loew's subsidiary Concourse Realty Corporation decided to buy Hewitt's entire assemblage later the same month.

Loew's announced in early 1928 that it would begin constructing four of the theaters, including the theater on the Concourse. Work on the theater began in April 1928, after N. Masem and Son was hired as the general contractor. Within a month, Loew's competitor Keith-Albee-Orpheum decided to develop a competing theater on a site on Fordham Road that had been vacant for four years. One local real-estate developer characterized the theater's construction as one of several improvements to "this great thoroughfare of the Bronx", the Grand Concourse. Eberson's son Drew, an apprentice in the Eberson firm, laid out the theater's stars and configured its cloud machine. The Architectural Plastering Company, led by Eberson and his wife Beatrice Lamb, may have designed almost all of the ornamentation inside the theater. In total, the theater had cost $4 million.

Loew's Paradise Theatre opened on September 7, 1929, the same day as the Kings Theatre. They were among the three Wonder Theatres whose openings were scheduled for that month, the other being the Jersey Theatre. On opening day, the theater hosted a performance of the United States' national anthem "The Star-Spangled Banner", followed by musical shows, short films, a live show, and a screening of the film The Mysterious Dr. Fu Manchu.

=== Use as movie theater ===
Visitors initially paid between 25 cents and one dollar per ticket. The cheapest tickets were for the orchestra and upper-balcony seats during weekday mornings, while the most expensive tickets were the lower balcony during weekend and holiday evenings. In addition to films and live shows, the Paradise was used for high-capacity public gatherings, such as graduation ceremonies. The Paradise was a frequent hangout for couples, many of whom kissed in the balcony. A New York Times writer said that the theater "was an indelible part of the mythic Bronx childhood".

==== 1920s and 1930s ====
The Loew's Paradise presented first runs of films along with stage shows when it opened. Initially, the Loew's Paradise presented stage shows that had already been performed at the Capitol Theatre in Manhattan. Frank Rieger was hired as the theater's first chief engineer, Dave Schooler was the initial master of ceremonies, Don Albert was the inaugural conductor, and Jerry de Rose was the first manager. Schooler led the theater's 25-piece band, which could play popular or classical music. In its first several days, the Paradise was often filled to capacity, although the Wall Street crash of 1929 occurred six weeks after the Paradise's opening. The nearby Loew's Grand Theatre began screening second runs of films that had been screened at the Paradise for two weeks. Overflow crowds from the theater usually visited the nearby RKO Fordham Theatre, a competing venue that also screened first runs of films, while patronage at the Grand Theatre had declined.

In late 1929, the orchestras at the Paradise and Loew's other theaters began performing at alternating Loew's theaters. Loew's then installed a Trans-tone wide screen at the Paradise Theatre in January 1930. Later that year, stage shows at the Paradise were temporarily halted before resuming. The theater's stage shows were rescheduled in 1931 so that they opened on Fridays, rather than on Saturdays as they previously had. Among the performers who appeared in the Paradise's stage shows were the jazz musician Cab Calloway, the actor Eddie Cantor, the jazz musician Ben Bernie, and the entertainers George Burns and Bob Hope. Loew's also began hosting five-act vaudeville shows at the Paradise in 1932. Nearly two dozen sticks of dynamite, enough to destroy the theater, were discovered in the projection booth that September; three thousand people were in the theater when the bomb was detected, and the bomb did not detonate only because it had a defective fuse. Disgruntled film operators were accused of planning the attempted bombing. With the onset of the Great Depression, the Paradise reduced ticket prices in 1934, and the most expensive tickets were decreased to 75 cents.

Loew's decided to stop hosting vaudeville shows at the Paradise in September 1935, switching to an all-film program; at the time, the company was eliminating vaudeville shows from most of its theaters. Ticket prices at the Paradise were reduced after the discontinuation of vaudeville shows. To attract visitors, and amid a decline in the number of newly released films, Loew's considered resuming vaudeville shows at the theater in 1936. The Paradise distributed prizes to random nighttime visitors in the 1930s as part of the Bank Night franchise, but these lotteries were discontinued following protests from the operators of rival theaters. Amid increasing competition from RKO theaters in the Bronx, in 1939, the Paradise began hosting live music each Tuesday to supplement its film screenings.

==== 1940s to 1960s ====
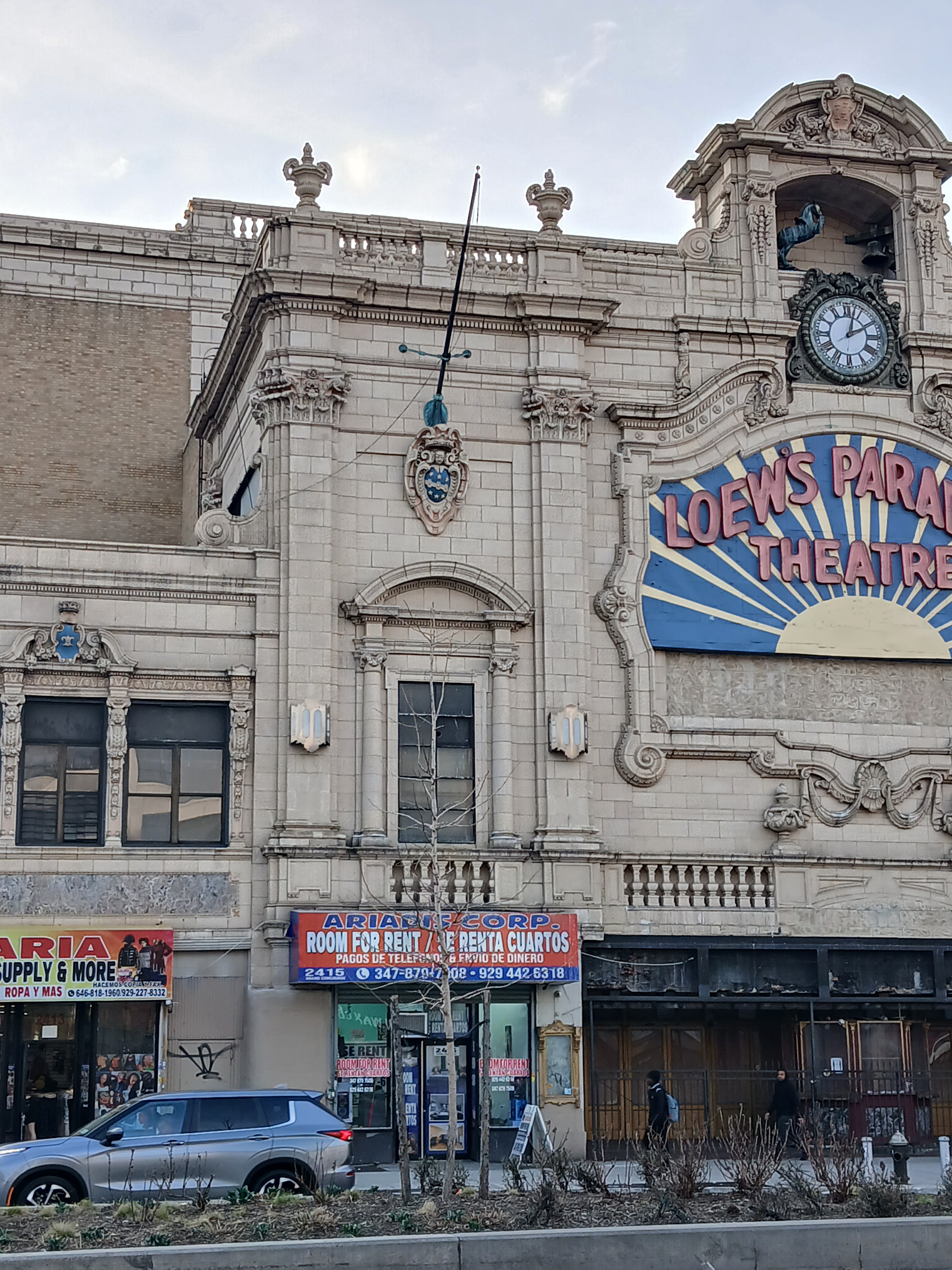
Detail of bay to the left (south) of the main entrance

The theater screened newsreel films during World War II, and Mayor Fiorello La Guardia also gave an air raid-preparation speech at the theater in 1942. Also in 1942, the theater's heating plant was converted from an oil-burning to a coal-burning plant. Following the U.S. Supreme Court's 1948 ruling in United States v. Paramount Pictures, Inc., Loew's Theaters was forced to split up its film-production and film-exhibition divisions. As part of the split, Loew's Theatres was compelled to either sell the Paradise Theater or limit the types of shows that were to be presented there. Additionally, the theater's original organ was relocated to California in 1949, and four seating rows were added above the organ console and orchestra pit around that time. The Paradise continued to show first runs of films; no other Loew's theater in the Bronx could showcase new films until after the Paradise had finished screening them.

In 1953, the theater was retrofitted with a panoramic screen and a stereophonic sound system. Following the success of jazz concerts at the Kings and Valencia theaters during that decade, Loew's began considering hosting jazz concerts at the Paradise. In addition, during the 1950s and 1960s, the Paradise hosted events like Easter prayer services, Christmas parties, rock-and-roll performances. and televised boxing matches. As late as 1956, Variety magazine described the Paradise as "perhaps the most successful neighborhood operation in the Loew's circuit". The theater's success was attributed to the fact that it was in a middle-class neighborhood, as well as the presence of the nearby Fordham Road shopping district.

By the 1960s, Loew's Theaters Inc. had begun to struggle financially, and the chain closed some of its larger theaters due to high expenses. In addition, urban residents had begun to move to the suburbs, and neighborhood movie houses had to compete with shopping-mall multiplexes and household televisions. The theater started screening multiple first-run films in 1964 as part of the Showcase program. The next year, Bernard Weinraub wrote for The New York Times that the theater "now emits a dusty, almost eerie quality". The fish pond in the lobby had been drained after customers poisoned the fish. The furnishings had been removed, destroyed, or damaged, and Loew's invited antiques dealers to remove the theater's art for safekeeping. The Saint George and dragon figures on the facade had been stolen, and the organ console was removed during the same decade.

==== 1970s to 1990s ====
The orchestra level was damaged in a pipe bombing in 1970, though no one was seriously hurt. The next year, there were rumors that a department store was considering moving into the theater. Afterward, Bronx borough president Robert Abrams proposed converting the Paradise Theater into a cultural center. At the time, the Paradise was one of the city's few remaining movie palaces. The theater continued to host events like broadcasts of soccer matches and a Metropolitan Opera performance. Loew's announced in August 1973 that it planned to divide the auditorium into two screening rooms. There would be an 1,890-seat screening room on the lower level and a 970-seat screening room on the upper level, though the decorations would be preserved; this project would cost $100,000. Abrams asked Loew's to postpone these plans so the cultural-center plan could be considered. Because of a consent decree that Loew's had signed in the 1950s, a federal court needed to approve any major alterations to the theater. The Bronx Council on the Arts received $25,000 to fund a study on the theater's future uses. The auditorium was divided the same year. The Paradise was one of several Loew's theaters that were subdivided during the mid-1970s, and it was the only Wonder Theatre to be divided in this manner.

A third screening room was added in 1975 or 1976; afterward, two of the screening rooms had 700 seats, while the other screening room had 1,300 seats. In addition, the fire exits were repaired in 1976 for $20,000. By the late 1970s, the Paradise no longer offered weekend matinee screenings of children's films due to a lack of demand. The Paradise underwent its final major subdivision in 1981, when a fourth screening room was added. There were two screens on either level, divided by a partition wall the center of each level. These changes hid practically all of the auditorium's original decorations, but most of the decorations remained in place. In 1988, police officers killed a patron in the theater after he shot a gun at them while they attempted to arrest him for murder.

In 1992, the New York City Landmarks Preservation Commission (LPC) began considering designating the Paradise Theater as a landmark. Because the auditorium had been so drastically subdivided, the LPC initially did not consider protecting the interiors. At the time, the theater was owned by a Delaware corporation called Chartwell Paradise, which was reportedly a shell corporation controlled by the Kushner Companies. The theater had become noticeably rundown; the auditorium reportedly had a bad smell and broken seats, while the bathrooms were dirty. Loew's was paying $5,000 a month in rent, plus $2,000 in monthly expenses, for the Paradise. Furthermore, most of the patrons who had once frequented the Paradise no longer lived nearby.

=== Subsequent use ===
==== Abandonment and preservation ====
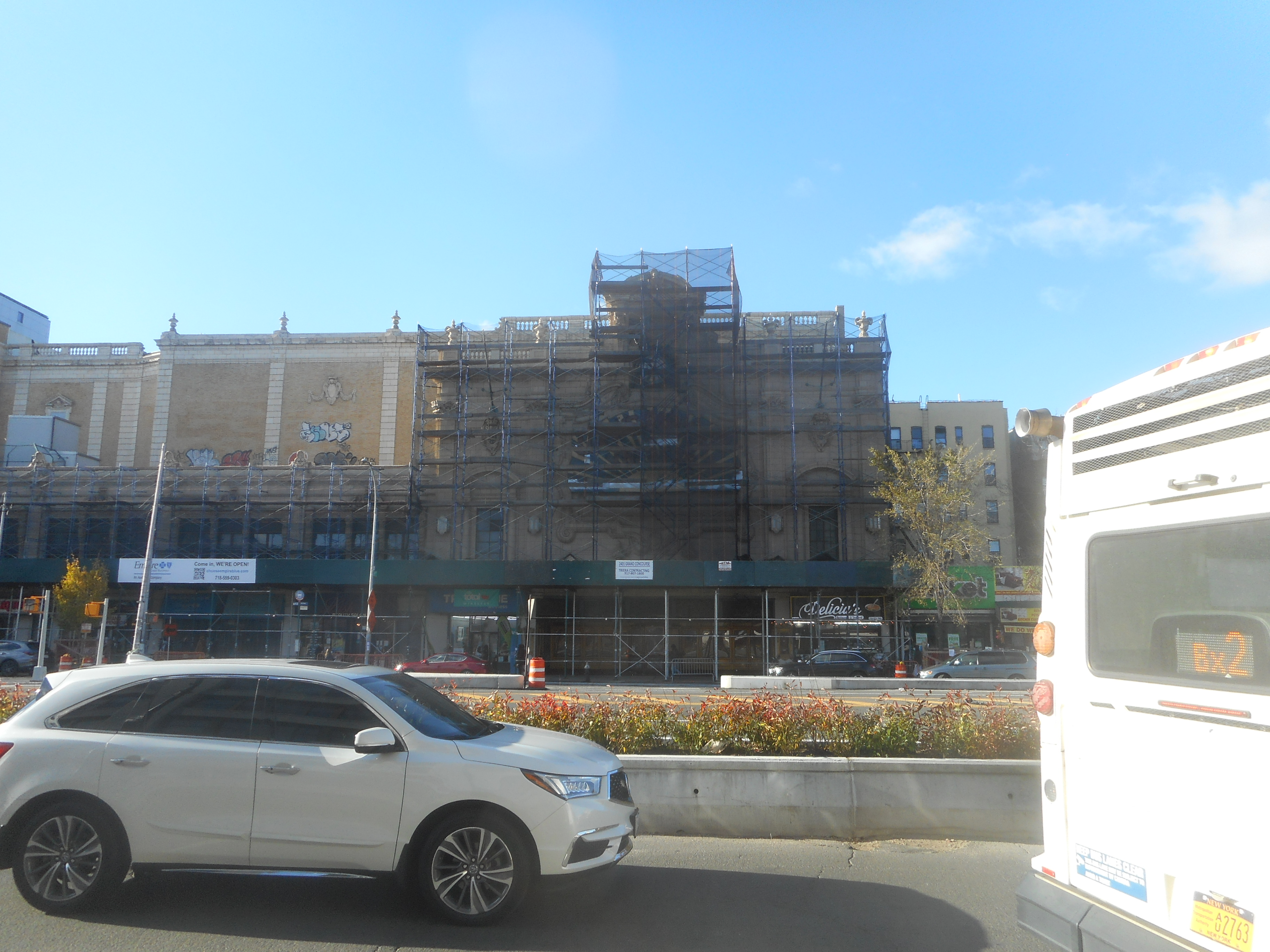
The theater covered in scaffolding

The Paradise Theater was closed in January 1994. Though signs outside the theater proclaimed that it was closed temporarily for renovation, a Loew's spokesperson said that they had lost their lease to the theater. A New York Daily News reporter wrote that the theater's marquee had a telephone number for a leasing company, but that the company's president was unaware that their number was even on the marquee. Antiques dealers and decorators expressed interest in removing the decorations. In response, Bronx borough president Fernando Ferrer asked the LPC to again look into designating the theater's facade as a landmark. Despite the interior modifications, preservationists also asked the LPC to designate the interior. Chartwell defaulted on the theater's $4.8 million mortgage loan after the theater closed. As such, another Delaware corporation called ABI Property Partners took over the theater in June 1994; they were represented by the Eames Asset Management Corporation. ABI's plans called for converting the theater into a shopping mall, which would have entailed covering the plaster decorations in the auditorium and subdividing the space.

Ferrer organized the Loews Paradise Task Force in mid-1994 to devise plans for the theater's future, and the task force requested $70,000 for a feasibility study into the theater. The actor Tony Randall was among the supporters of the theater's restoration. At the end of the year, the Bronx Overall Economic Development Corporation opened a request for proposal for a study into the theater, and five consulting firms bid for the right to conduct the study. In May 1996, the stage was severely damaged by a fire. Trespassers began removing decorations from the building, prompting the LPC to again consider preserving the theater. The LPC, the New York Landmarks Conservancy, and Eames discussed the creation of an easement that would preserve the lobby spaces while allowing the auditorium and stage house to be converted to a mall.

In early 1997, the developer William Procida began soliciting bids for the Paradise's restoration on Eames's behalf. Procida received proposals from a variety of groups, including a city school district, retailers, and cinema operators. The facade was granted city-landmark status in April 1997, but the interior was not designated as a landmark at the time. By then, Procida had received around 100 requests for information from potential bidders. In the meanwhile, Eames considered turning the theater into a health club, entertainment complex, or school. Most of the interior was intact but had become dirty, with some water damage.

==== Renovation ====
The real-estate developer and boxing promoter Richard P. DeCesare leased the Paradise in 1998 after seeing the gutted interior. In early 1999, DeCesare agreed to a deal that would allow him to buy the building outright for about $3.9 million. At the time, he intended to renovate the Paradise into a boxing arena and events venue for about $4 million. DeCesare employed Higgins & Quasebarth as the preservation consultant and Lawless & Mangione as the restoration architect. He employed 60 workers to help renovate the theater, which he wanted to reopen in September 1999 for the Paradise's 70th anniversary. The Paradise's smaller screens were dismantled, and the auditorium was restored. Work was delayed due to the need to conduct additional repairs and secure the necessary permits. By August 1999, the project's cost had increased to $6.5 million, and DeCesare had not finalized his purchase of the theater. At the beginning of 2000, the boxing promoter Joe DeGuardia still anticipated that the theater would reopen within a year.

The restoration had been halted by 2001 due to missed rent payments. DeCesare's team had ordered some cast-iron seats and repainted the ceiling, but workers had not gotten around to installing the seats or adding light bulbs. DeCesare had spent $5 million on renovation to date; he claimed that he had stopped paying rent because he was in the process of refinancing the building. Also in 2001, the theater's owners agreed to sell the property to the developer Gerald Lieblich. The sale was halted for two years because of lawsuits from DeCesare, who wanted to retain control of the Paradise. Lieblich finalized his purchase in 2003, paying $4.5 million, though work did not resume until 2004. Lieblich removed many of the prior modifications such as partitions, and he finished cleaning the decorations and installing new seats. In addition, workers repainted various parts of the interior. Lieblich then leased the theater to Gabriel Boter, although Joe DeGuardia retained the exclusive right to schedule boxing matches there.

==== Event venue and church conversion ====
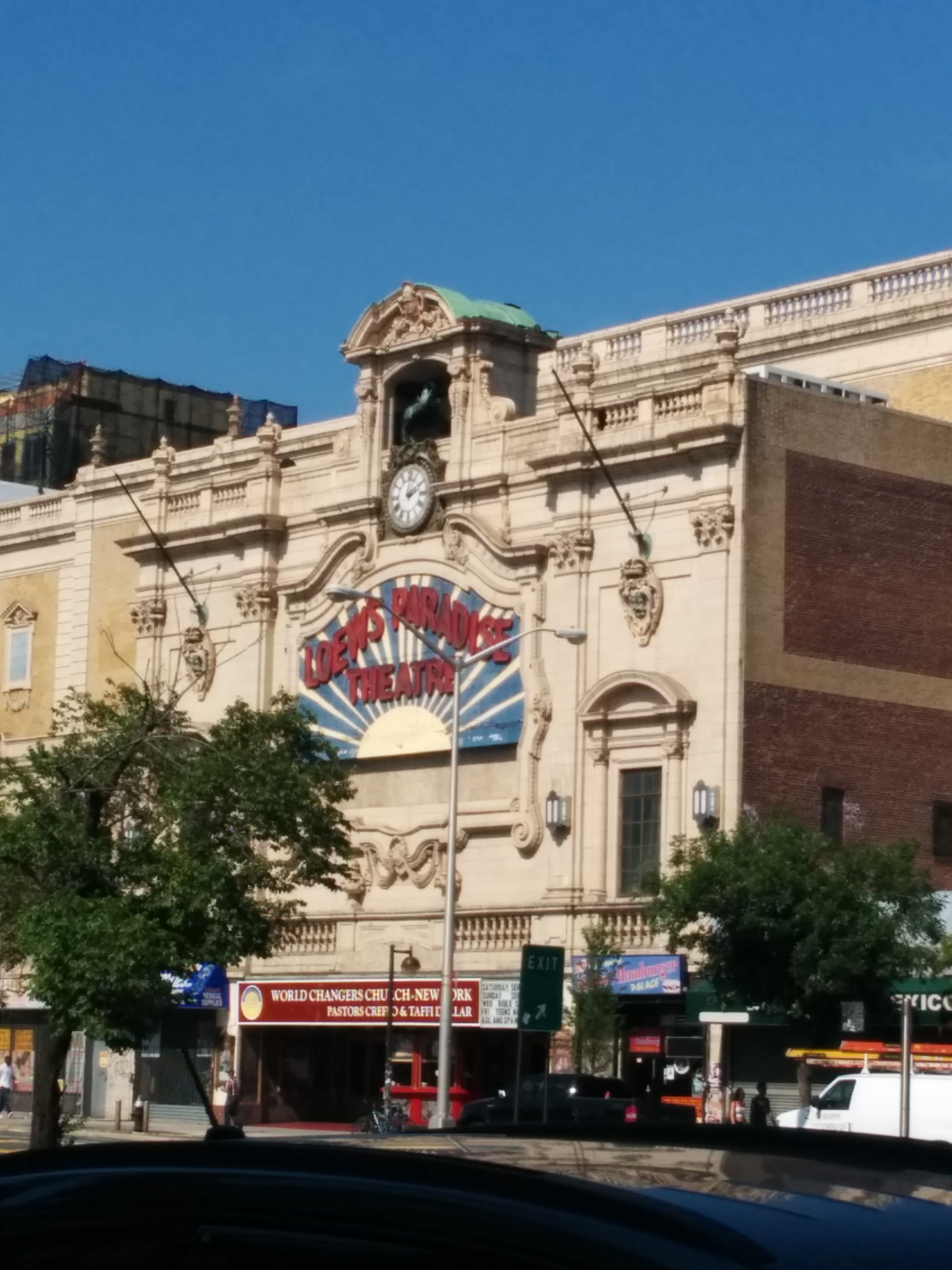
The theater as seen from slightly to the north in 2014

The theater reopened on October 29, 2005, as a live-event venue. Boter anticipated at the time that the Paradise would present 35 live events and 10 boxing matches annually. Initially, the theater hosted events that catered to the local Latino community, with events like Latin music concerts and a salsa and merengue music show. The theater was also rented out for children's theatrical shows, graduation ceremonies, weddings, bar and bat mitzvahs, and political gatherings. The chef Eric Basulto was hired to operate the Paradise's restaurant. The interior of the theater was preserved as a landmark in May 2006; as such, all alterations to the interior, except for the stage area, were subject to approval from the LPC. During its time as an event venue, the Paradise hosted performances by musicians such as the rapper Rick Ross, the rock band The Killers, and the baseball player Bernie Williams. The theater also hosted events such as the Bronx Ball.

The actress Cathy Moriarty and her husband, the developer Joe Gentile, acquired the Paradise Theater in July 2007 through their company, Utopia Studios. Gentile and Moriarty renamed the venue the Utopia's Paradise Theater, and they wanted to host family-oriented events and productions there. The Paradise Theater was closed briefly in the late 2000s, reopening on October 24, 2009, after concert promoters Derrick Sanders and Shelby Joyner took over management. In 2011, the Paradise Theater was refinanced with a $5.7 million mortgage loan. The theater continued to host performers including the rapper Nicki Minaj and the rock band Vampire Weekend. In addition, DeGuardia asked the new owners to host boxing matches there.

In October 2012, the Paradise Theater was leased to the World Changers Church, a prosperity gospel congregation led by Atlanta–based pastor Creflo Dollar and his wife Taffi. The building's interior was damaged in a fire the next month; an investigation subsequently found that the fire had been caused by construction workers whose tools had sparked a piece of hot metal. The church added a gift shop in the theater, while the box office became a prayer station. The church suspended services in 2020 due to the COVID-19 pandemic and subsequently moved to a new location. By 2023, the building was still vacant; The New Yorker characterized the theater as being covered in scaffolding, and the interior as having been boarded up. Vanessa Gibson, the Bronx borough president at the time, said that there were plans to reopen the Paradise, although it would not operate as a theater. A reporter for The Bronx Times wrote that, at the time, there was little demand for additional theaters in the Bronx due to the popularity of online streaming media.

The Bronx Independent Cinema Center began hosting events there in 2025. Subsequently, a group called Paradise Performing Arts Center (PPAC) hired EverGreene Architectural Arts to restore the theater. In September 2026, PPAC announced that the theater would be renovated as a 4,000-seat performing arts center, with a preview event that November. Work on a $50 million renovation began that October.

== Impact ==
When the theater opened in 1929, the Brooklyn Times-Union wrote that the Paradise Theater had been described as "the most elaborate theatre outside of Manhattan", and the Brooklyn Daily Times wrote that Broadway venues paled in comparison to the Loew's Kings and Paradise theaters. Logan Billingsley, the chairman of the Bronx Chamber of Commerce, said that "in every detail it will equal the pretentious display of talent that has marked the downtown [New York City] Loew theatres". Architecture and Building praised the theater's design, saying that "decorative artifice is carried to the extreme" there.

In the 1970s, the New York Post characterized the Paradise as "one of the last truly splendid movie palaces in New York". A Times reporter wrote in 1997 that the Paradise had been "considered one of the finest examples of the grand movie houses built during the earlier half of the century", and another Times writer summarized the theater as "beyond rococo". A Newsday reporter described the theater as having "flamboyant art-deco sensibility". After the theater was subdivided, the journalist Joseph Lelyveld wrote in The New York Times in 1977 that "its glory days as a landmark in the Bronx can be only a memory", while Elliott Stein wrote for Film Comment that "Eberson's grand design is a shambles". Conversely, a New York Daily News film guide said that "the Paradise is a must on every moviegoer's list", despite the subdivision of the auditorium. A writer for The Wilson Quarterly said in 2000 that images of the abandoned theater prompted "mixed disbelief, laughter, and regret in just about equal measure", citing the poor condition of the "architecturally giddy" decorations.

When the theater reopened in 2005, a writer for The Journal News described the theater as feeling "more like a European opera house, with its elaborate baroque stylings, gilded surfaces and marble staircases". The New York Times's architectural critic Christopher Gray characterized the ground-floor spaces as a cross between a half-dozen palaces, and he described the auditorium as an "architectural atomic pile". Lloyd Ultan, the borough historian for the Bronx, said in 2012 that the Paradise was "a piece not only of theater history, but of architectural history as well". Yet another observer likened the Paradise Theater to "an outdoor baroque Italian garden". The architectural writer Judith Gura described the theater in 2015 as "an opulent escapist environment that could be enjoyed for as little as twenty-five cents" at the time of its opening. Reporters for the Bronx Times wrote that "the building screams vintage cinema", with its Baroque and Renaissance decorations.

Images of the Paradise Theater were displayed at the Cooper-Hewitt Museum as part of a 1982 exhibition on American movie palaces. In addition, the theater was the subject of a 2003 short film.

== See also ==
- List of New York City Designated Landmarks in the Bronx
