= Loew's Wonder Theatres =

Five New York City movie palaces

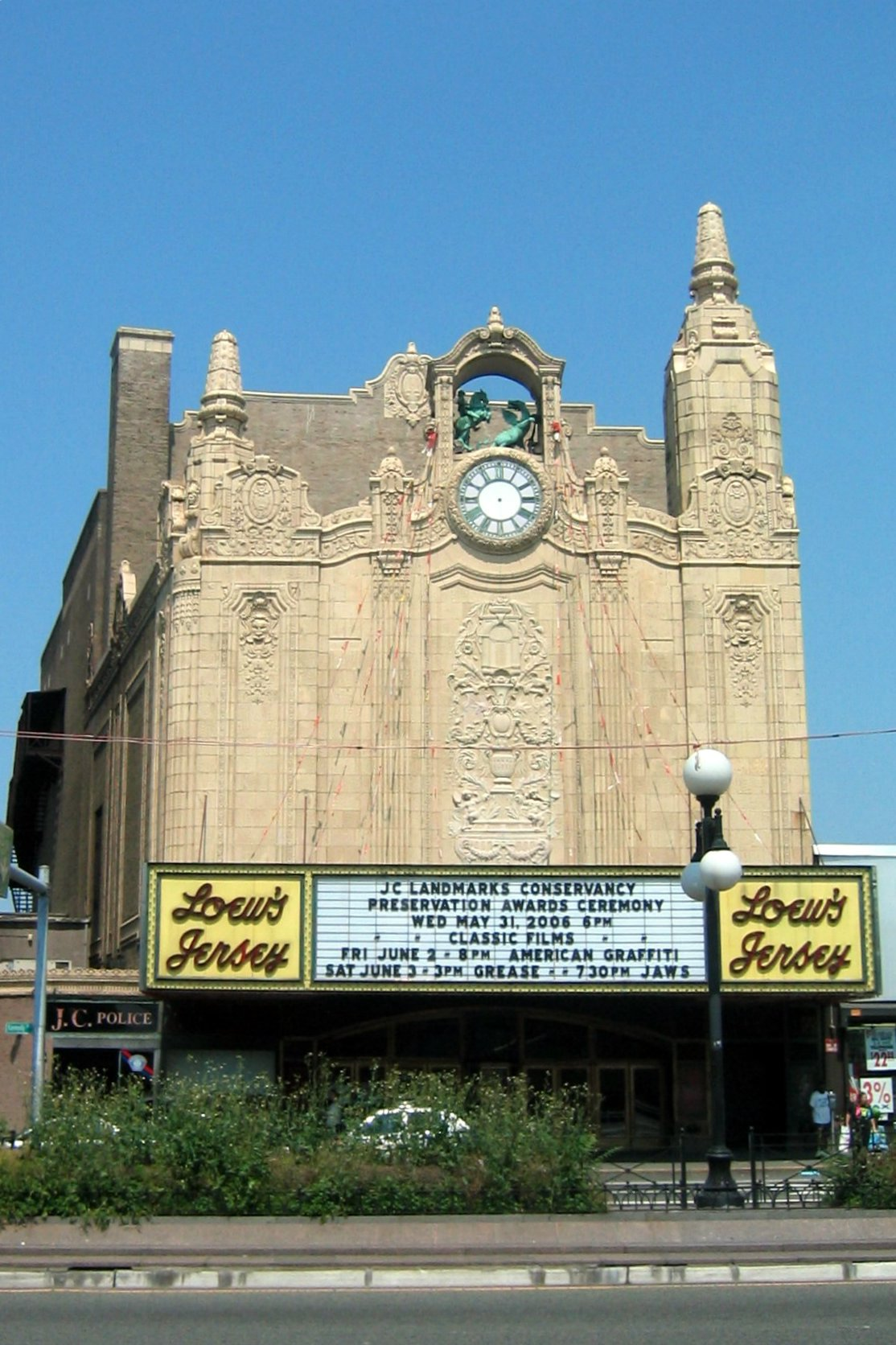
Loew's Jersey Theatre exterior 2006.

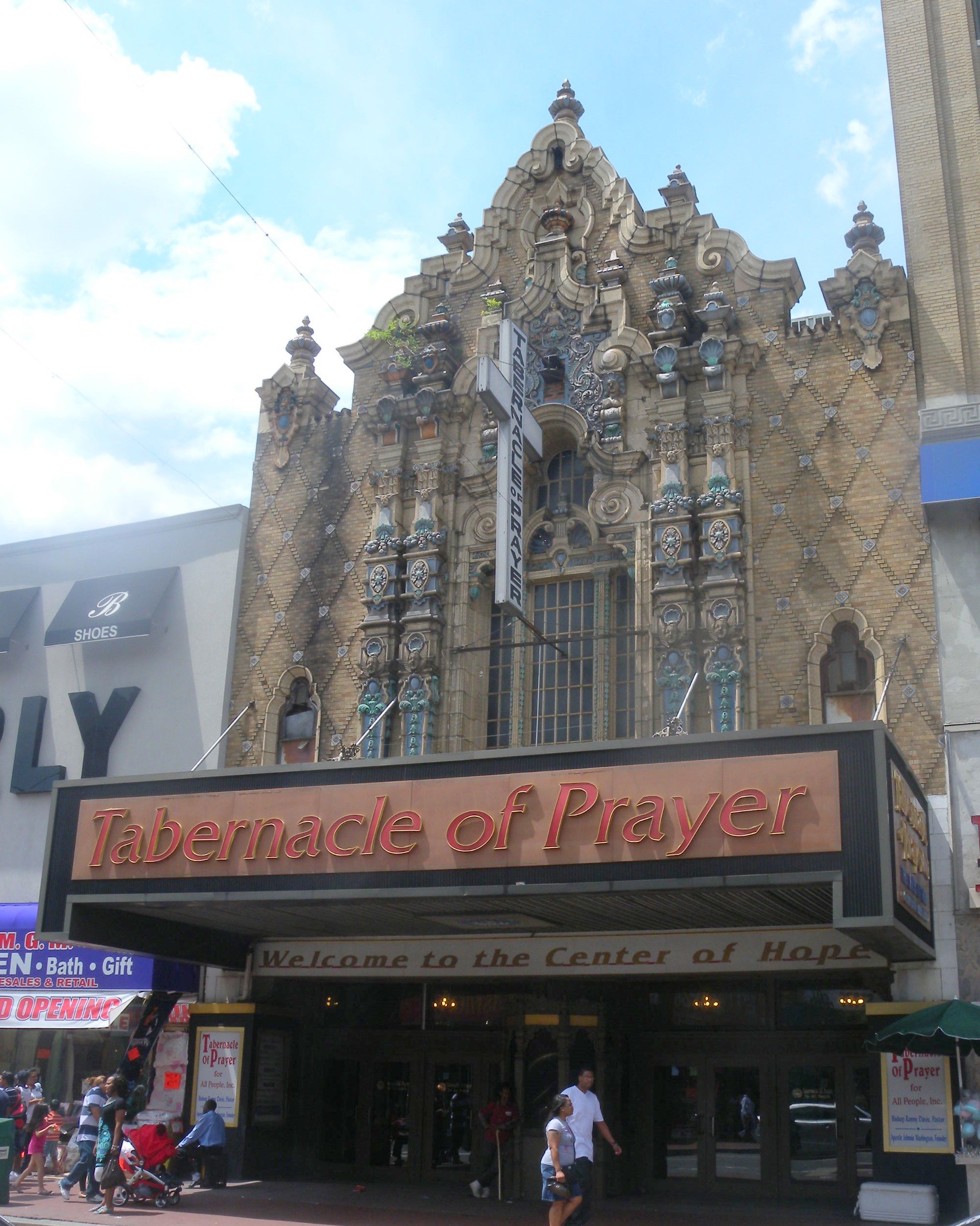
Loew's Valencia, Jamaica, Queens

The Loew's Wonder Theatres were movie palaces of the Loew's Theatres chain in and near New York City. These five lavishly designed theaters were built by Loew's to establish its preeminence in film exhibition in the metropolitan New York City area and to serve as the chain's flagship venues, each in its own area. All five theaters are still standing. One operates as a community performing arts center; one is a commercial live entertainment venue; and three are currently used as churches, with one of those also used for entertainment.

== Background ==
Paramount-Publix head Adolph Zukor acquired the successful Balaban and Katz theater chain in 1926. Partner Sam Katz would later run the Paramount-Publix theatre chain in New York City from the Paramount Building on Times Square.

Balaban and Katz had developed the Wonder Theater concept, first publicized around 1918 in Chicago. The Chicago Theatre was created as an opulent theater with many amenities for its patrons and was advertised as a "wonder theatre". When Publix acquired the Balaban and Katz chain they embarked on a project to expand the wonder theaters, and started to build in New York in 1926. While Balaban and Publix were dominant in Chicago, Loew's was the major player in New York, and did not want Publix theaters to overshadow their own. The two companies brokered a non-competition deal for New York and Chicago, and Loew's took over the New York area projects, developing the five Loew's Wonder Theaters. Publix continued Balaban and Katz's wonder theater development in its home area.

== Theaters ==
- Loew's 175th Street Theatre, Manhattan (opened 1930) - Operates as a church and an entertainment venue under the name United Palace.
- Loew's Jersey Theatre, Jersey City (opened 1929) - Operates as a classic cinema and performing arts center.
- Loew's Kings Theatre, Brooklyn (opened 1929) - Reopened January 23, 2015, following a complete renovation.
- Loew's Paradise Theatre, The Bronx (opened 1929) - Between 2005 and 2012 it operated as a venue for live entertainment. It is currently a church.
- Loew's Valencia Theatre, Queens (opened 1929) - Remains open as a church, the Tabernacle of Prayer.
