= Valencia Theatre =

Theater in Queens, New York

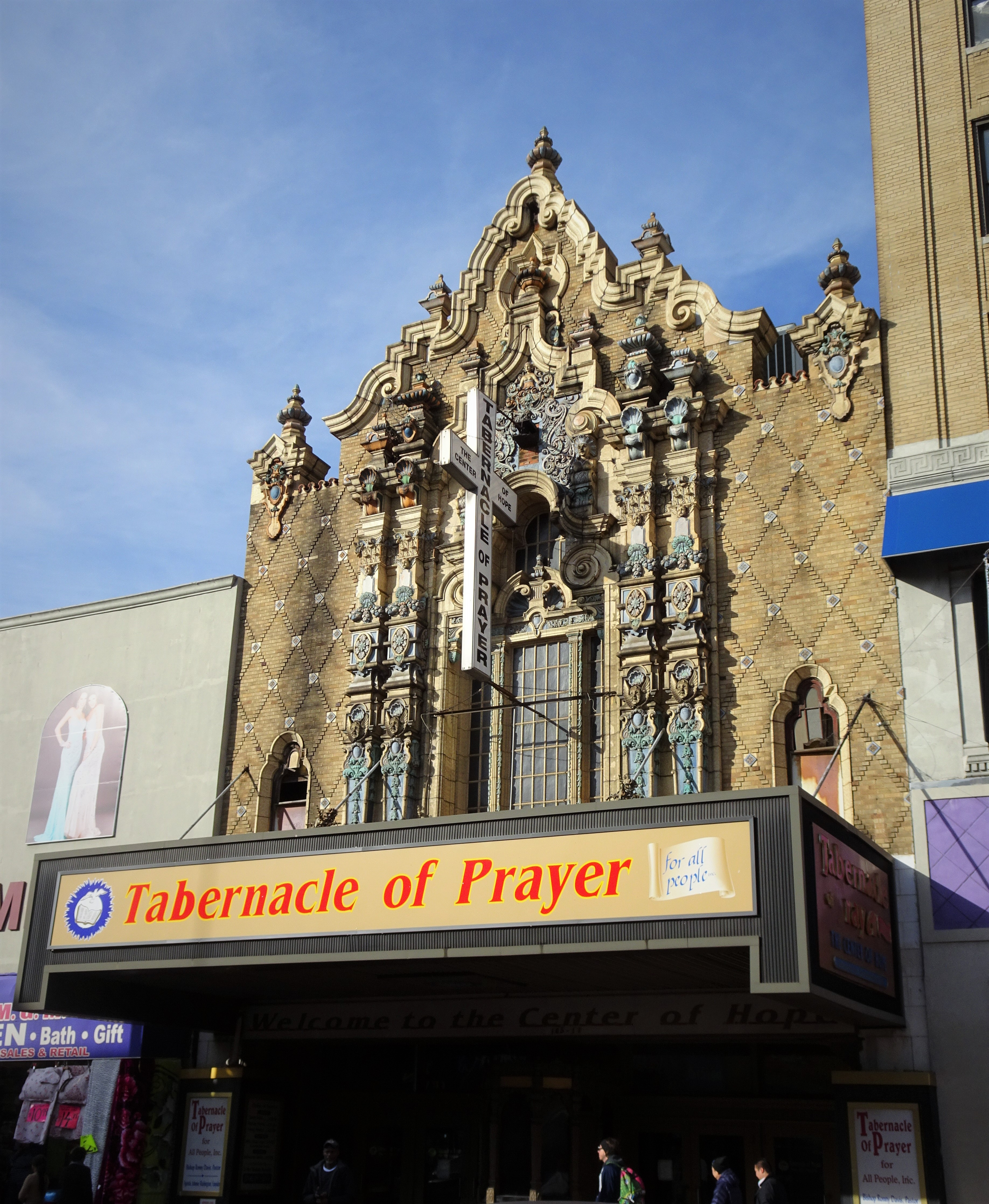
- The theater's marquee seen in 2016
- Interactive map of Valencia Theatre
- Full name: Tabernacle of Prayer
- Former names: Loew's Valencia Theatre
- Address: 165-11 Jamaica Avenue; Jamaica, New York; United States
- Coordinates: 40°42′22″N 73°47′41″W
- Capacity: 3,500
- Type: Church and movie palace

Construction
- Built: June–December 1928
- Opened: January 12, 1929
- Architect: John Eberson
- General contractor: Thompson–Starrett Company

New York City Landmark
- Designated: May 25, 1999
- Reference no.: 2036

The Valencia Theatre (formerly the Loew's Valencia Theatre) is a church and former theater at 165-11 Jamaica Avenue in the Jamaica neighborhood of Queens, New York City. Designed by John Eberson as a movie palace, it opened on January 11, 1929, as one of five Loew's Wonder Theatres in the New York City area. The theater has been occupied by the Tabernacle of Prayer for All People since 1977. It is a New York City designated landmark.

The Valencia Theatre occupies an L-shaped site and is divided into two sections: the lobby section and the auditorium. The lobby section, decorated in a Spanish and Mexican Baroque style, has an elaborate brick-and-terracotta facade with a marquee and ornate finials. The entrance leads to a lobby and foyer, which are also decorated in Spanish styles. The auditorium has 3,500 seats on two levels, with an elaborately decorated proscenium arch, walls, and ceilings. Like the other Wonder Theaters, the Valencia Theatre featured a "Wonder Morton" theater pipe organ manufactured by the Robert Morton Organ Company, though the organ has since been removed.

In December 1926, the builder Ralph Riccardo acquired the site and leased it to Paramount-Publix. Allied Owners Inc. took over the theater site and developed it starting in 1928, leasing the venue to Loew's Theatres. The Valencia Theatre originally presented films and live shows, and it had a regional monopoly on the first runs of films. The live shows were discontinued within five years of the theater's opening. The theater slowly declined after World War II, and it closed in June 1977 due to high costs and low attendance. The Tabernacle of Prayer took over the theater for a nominal fee and spent $250,000 on renovations, moving into the theater in October 1977. Since then, the Valencia has functioned as a church. Over the years, the theater has been praised for its architecture.

== Description ==
The Valencia Theatre is located at 165-11 Jamaica Avenue in the Jamaica neighborhood of Queens, New York City. It consists of a narrow lobby section along Jamaica Avenue, as well as an auditorium and stage house in the rear. The L-shaped site wraps around another building at 165-17 Jamaica Avenue (on the northwest corner of Jamaica Avenue and Merrick Boulevard), extending half the length of the block toward 89th Avenue. The building has a frontage of 39.4 feet (12.0 m) on Jamaica Avenue to the south and 210 feet (64 m) on Merrick Boulevard to the east. The theater abuts the 165th Street Bus Terminal immediately to the north.

The theater was one of five Loew's Wonder Theatres in the New York City area, along with the Jersey Theatre in Jersey City, the 175th Street Theatre in Manhattan, the Paradise Theatre in the Bronx, and the Kings Theatre in Brooklyn. The Paradise and Valencia, along with the Lane Theater on Staten Island, are the only atmospheric theaters in New York City designed by John Eberson. Similarly to the Paradise Theatre, the Valencia is decorated in a Spanish style.

=== Facade ===
The brick-and-terracotta facade is decorated in a Spanish and Mexican Baroque style, similarly to the facades of the Indiana Theatre in Indianapolis and the Majestic Theatre in San Antonio. The metal-and-glass doors are recessed slightly from the facade, and an octagonal ticket booth protrudes from the middle of the entrance. The booth has cast metal columns topped by finials, as well as a fret motif near the bottom. The doors are flanked by volutes, which support a metal panel with foliate decorations on its soffit, though both the volutes and panel are covered by signage. There is a marquee above the entrance, which originally spelled the name "Loew's Valencia" and had decorative motifs made of zinc; the marquee has also been covered up.

The upper stories of the Jamaica Avenue facade are clad with yellow brick and are divided vertically into three bays. There are terracotta decorations such as cherub heads. In the outer bays, the bricks are laid in a diaper pattern, with protruding bricks that form diagonal lines; there are lighter-colored bricks where the diagonal lines intersect. There are also lancet windows in the outer bays at the second story. The center bay has a large opening with a terracotta frame, which is divided into a central window measuring five panes wide and a pair of outer windows each measuring two panes wide. The terracotta pilasters on either side contain decorations like swags, cherubs' heads, volutes, and half-shells. Above the outer windows are spiral volutes, which in turn flank a central window with a curved gable. The gable is topped by terracotta panels with floral motifs and sphinxes. At the top of the facade is an elaborate curving parapet, with three finials above the center bay and a single finial above each of the outer bays. A vertical sign is also attached to the facade.

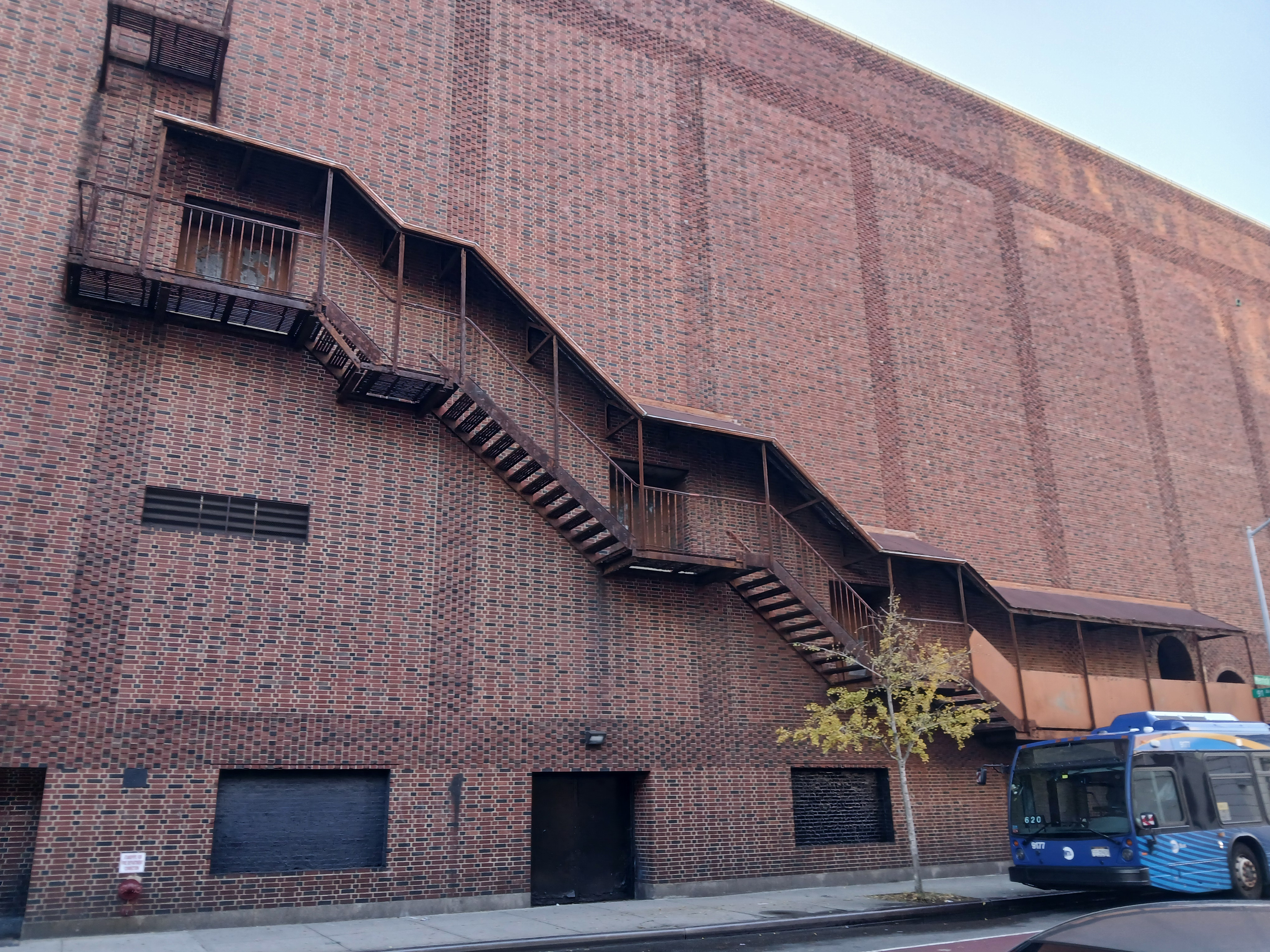
The Merrick Boulevard elevation

The Merrick Boulevard and northern elevations are also visible from the street. On Merrick Boulevard, the facade is made mostly of red and black brick, although the water table at the bottom of the facade is made of stone. Some of the bricks are laid so that their header surfaces face outward; these bricks are stacked vertically to give the impression of rectangular brick panels. There is a fire stair leading from the balcony level, as well as an emergency-exit doorway with six doors at ground level near the south end of the facade. At ground level, the middle of the Merrick Boulevard facade contains a brick niche, with a grate leading to a sidewalk vault; in addition, there are three rectangular blind openings and two more emergency-exit doors. The northern end of the Merrick Boulevard facade has two archways, as well as a two-story service annex with a garage door and windows. The northern elevation is also covered in red and brown brick, with rectangular brick panels; the service annex protrudes from the bottom of the northern elevation. There is a water tower atop the building, which is visible from the north.

=== Interior ===
External image
- Panoramic view of the lobby

The interior is adorned in Spanish Colonial and pre–Columbian styles, with a gold, ruby, cobalt, and turquoise color scheme. The main lobby measured 50 by 100 feet (15 by 30 m) across, and its ceiling was nearly four stories high. The center of the ceiling was flat, while the sides of the ceiling were splayed outward, with trusses made of iron and wood. Pieces of Spanish pottery were placed in niches on either side of the lobby. A marble-and-wrought iron staircase ascended from the lobby, and there was a stone fountain with multicolored tiles next to the stair. Next to the lobby was a two-story foyer with Spanish-style columns supporting a set of arches and a vaulted ceiling. The foyer was illuminated by soft blue lamps and also had a carpet. There was also a goldfish pond in the foyer.

The auditorium itself seats around 3,500 people (Note: According to Landmarks Preservation Commission 1999, p. 10, contemporary news sources cite the theater as having about 4,000 seats, a claim also repeated in a 1986 New York Daily News article. The Theatre Historical Society of America and a 1987 New York Times article cite 3,554 seats.) and is decorated to resemble a Spanish garden. The seats are split across an orchestra level and a balcony, with 2,500 seats on the orchestra level. The auditorium walls are adorned with statues, parapets, and towers, asymmetrically arranged, while the ceiling remains unadorned. The proscenium arch is decorated in a Spanish style and is topped by a large niche with a sculpture inside. There are smaller backlit arches on either side of the central niche above the proscenium. The side walls have decorations such as windows, railings, balconies, and turrets, which were intended to give the appearance of 17th-century Spanish buildings. The decorations are arranged in sloped tiers and are designed in the Churrigueresque style. Statues of nude figures are placed high above the walls. On either side of the proscenium is an organ loft.

The rear walls of the organ loft are painted blue to resemble the sky, and the ceiling is mostly painted blue, giving the impression that the auditorium is open-air. The ceiling also has painted stars. There was also a cloud machine, which generated cloud-like mists that moved across the ceiling, but the machine had broken down by the 1970s. Three chandeliers were hung from the ceiling. A fourth chandelier with 360 lights, measuring 15 feet (4.6 m) across and 18.5 feet (5.6 m) high, was installed in the 1970s; this chandelier was imported from Greece.

Like the other Wonder Theaters, the Loew's Valencia Theatre featured a "Wonder Morton" theater pipe organ manufactured by the Robert Morton Organ Company. The organ featured a console with 4 manuals and 23 ranks of pipes. The organ was disassembled in the 1960s and relocated to the Balboa Theatre in San Diego, where it was restored and debuted in 2009.

== History ==
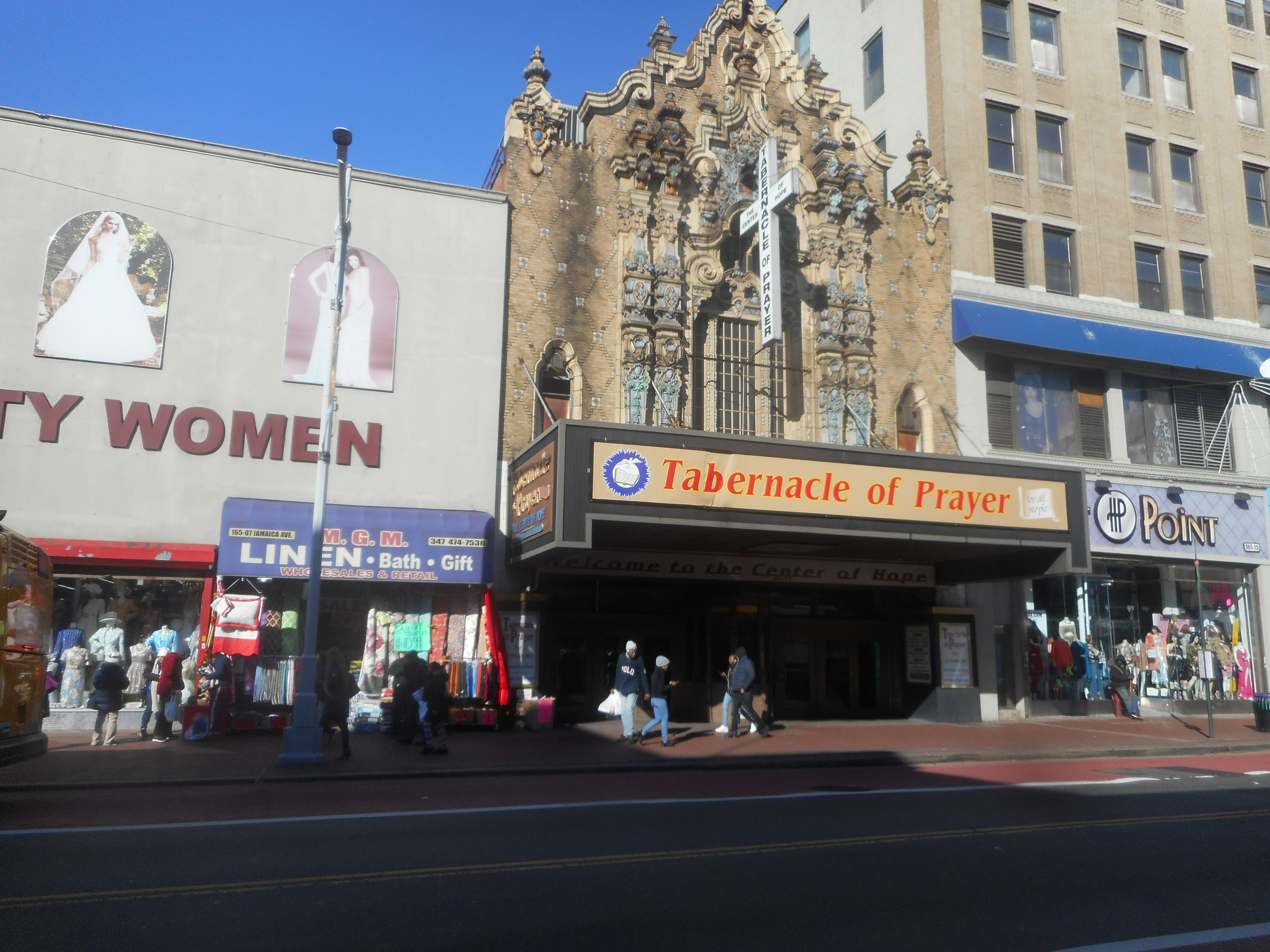
The front of the theater seen from Jamaica Avenue

Movie palaces became common in the 1920s between the end of World War I and the beginning of the Great Depression. In the New York City area, only a small number of operators were involved in the construction of movie palaces. These theaters' designers included the legitimate-theater architects Thomas W. Lamb, C. Howard Crane, and John Eberson. By the late 1920s, numerous movie palaces were being developed in outlying neighborhoods in New York City; previously, the city's movie palaces had been concentrated in Midtown Manhattan. The five Wonder Theatres were developed by Loew's Inc., which at the time was competing with Paramount-Publix. In 1927, Loew's president Nicholas Schenck agreed to take over five sites from Paramount-Publix, in exchange for agreeing not to build competing theaters in Chicago; these five sites became the Wonder Theatres.

=== Development and opening ===
In December 1926, the builder Ralph Riccardo acquired a 140-by-206-foot (43 by 63 m) site at the northwest corner of Jamaica Avenue and Merrick Road (now Merrick Boulevard) from A. L. Werner and Steuart/Hirschman. According to a contemporary advertisement, the site had previously contained a wooden residence. Riccardo soon sold half of the site to Paramount-Publix, which reportedly paid $1 million for the site. In exchange, Paramount-Publix was required to build a theater on the site. Allied Owners Inc., which was established in 1927 to develop the Kings, Paramount, Pitkin, and Valencia theaters, took over the site at Jamaica Avenue and Merrick Road as part of an agreement with Paramount. In March 1927, Paramount-Publix announced that it would build a theater at Jamaica Avenue and Merrick Road. The Jamaica theater was planned to cost $2.25 million with about 2,500 seats. The theater was one of nine that Paramount-Publix planned to develop in outlying New York City neighborhoods, though the company later dropped plans for four of the other theaters. Riccardo also hired Rapp and Rapp to develop a six-story commercial building abutting the theater.

Paramount-Publix reassigned its leases of the Kings, Pitkin, and Valencia theaters to Loew's in November 1927. Loew's took over the site in February 1928, after the blueprints had been approved. Loew's was still required to develop the site as a theater. For the theater's construction, Loew's Inc. agreed to pay Allied Owners Inc. $19,000 a month for 181 months, in exchange for receiving financing from Allied Owners Inc., and Paramount-Publix agreed to guarantee the Valencia Theatre's construction. Loew's Inc. was to have taken ownership of the property in 1945, once the bonds had been paid off. Loew's announced in early 1928 that it would begin constructing four of the theaters, including the theater in Jamaica. The Thompson-Starrett Company began erecting the theater in June 1928. John Eberson's son Drew, who assisted in the theater's construction, sketched out the stars on the auditorium's ceiling by copying an issue of National Geographic magazine. By that August, the theater was known as the Valencia; this name, derived from Spanish, was chosen because it sounded exotic. The theater was to be Long Island's largest cinema with 4,000 seats. A furniture store, Ludwig Baumann & Co., leased the neighboring commercial building.

The Valencia opened on January 12, 1929, and was the first of the five Wonder Theaters to be completed. Its first-ever patron had waited several hours to buy her ticket. Loew's invited officials from every town and reporters from every newspaper on Long Island to the theater's dedication. The first film to screened there was the 1928 talking film White Shadows in the South Seas, accompanied by vaudeville performances on stage. Initially, the Valencia hosted stage shows and films that had been shown at Manhattan's Capitol Theatre, which cost between 25 and 65 cents a ticket. The theater accommodated 17,000 patrons on opening day and 33,000 in its first week.

=== Theatrical use ===
==== 1920s and 1930s ====
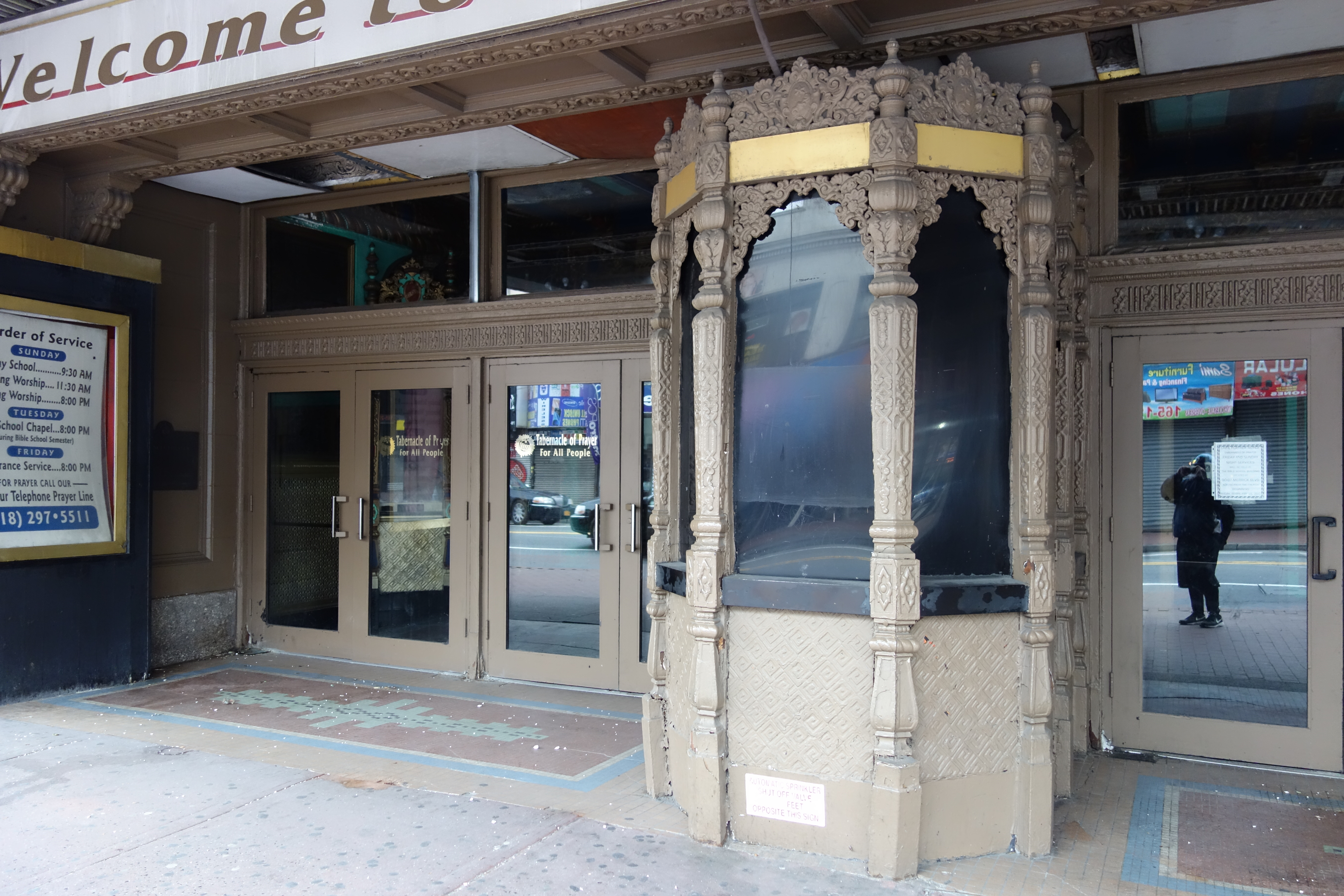
Main entrance

The theater quickly became an attraction for people in not only Jamaica, but other parts of Queens and Long Island. If the first run of a film was being shown at the Valencia Theatre, the theater had a regional monopoly on that film for seven days; during that time, the film could not be shown in any other Loew's theater as far east as Bay Shore, New York. It was one of three large theaters in Queens, along with the now-demolished Loew's Triboro and RKO Keith's Flushing theaters, both of which were also atmospheric theaters. Loew's implemented a policy wherein stage shows from the Capitol Theatre were successively sent to the Loew's Paradise, Kings, Valencia, and Jersey City theaters. Additionally, the orchestras at the Valencia and Loew's other theaters began performing at alternating Loew's theaters later that year.

In 1930, Loew's installed a Trans-tone wide screen at the Valencia Theatre. By then, the theater's managers were operating bus routes to nearby neighborhoods to attract customers. At the time, it was one of the few Loew's theaters in New York City that still hosted both vaudeville and film. The next year, the theater's stage shows were rescheduled so that they opened on Fridays, rather than on Saturdays as they previously had. Loew's also began hosting five-act vaudeville shows at the Valencia in 1932. Loew's defaulted on the theater's mortgage loan in June 1933, and the Valencia's owner, Allied Owners, filed for bankruptcy protection that November. Manufacturers Trust also moved to foreclose on a $9 million mortgage that it had placed on the Valencia and four other Allied theaters. Allied Owners subsequently presented a reorganization plan in 1934, and a federal judge approved the plan in March 1935, allowing Allied to transfer ownership of the Kings, Pitkin, and Valencia theaters to Loew's once the debt on these three theaters had been paid off. Allied Owners agreed to sell the three theaters to Loew's for $12,875,000, which would be paid out over 25 years. As part of the agreement, Loew's would pay $500,000 for the first ten years and $525,000 for the next fifteen years.

Through the 1930s, the theater hosted both live shows and movies. For example, winners of the Major Bowes Amateur Hour radio show's contest would appear there every Monday night, and performers like Ginger Rogers and Kate Smith also starred there. Loew's decided to stop hosting vaudeville shows at the Valencia in September 1935, switching to an all-film program; at the time, the company was eliminating vaudeville shows from most of its theaters. In addition, ticket prices at the Valencia were reduced after the discontinuation of vaudeville shows. Loew's management did not reinstate the vaudeville shows, saying the theater was making a profit in spite of their absence. Ted Arnow, a Loew's executive, later recalled that the Valencia sold 25-cent matinee tickets well into the 1940s and that the inexpensive tickets belied the theater's elaborate design. Arnow also recalled that the theater was particularly popular on weekends, with patrons coming from all over Long Island. The New York Times wrote that the Valencia was "the hottest spot in town" on Saturdays.

==== 1940s to 1970s ====
In 1942, the theater's heating plant was converted from an oil-burning to a coal-burning plant. The following June, the operators of the nearby Savoy Theatre sued Loew's and several other theatrical operators and distributors, claiming that Loew's Valencia and Hillside theaters were violating U.S. antitrust laws. At the time, the Valencia and Hillside were the only theaters in Jamaica that were allowed to screen first runs of films, while all other theaters in the area had to wait one week before screening the same films; the lawsuit was settled the same year. Loew's was sued again in 1944 by a theater operator in Bay Shore for a similar reason; this lawsuit was dropped the next year for unspecified reasons. To attract customers in the late 1940s, Loew's offered free tickets to residents of the then-new Fresh Meadows housing development.

Following the U.S. Supreme Court's 1948 ruling in United States v. Paramount Pictures, Inc., Loew's Theaters was forced to split up its film-production and film-exhibition divisions. As part of the split, Loew's Theatres was compelled to either sell the Valencia Theatre or limit the types of shows that were to be presented there. In 1953, the theater was retrofitted with a panoramic screen and a stereophonic sound system, becoming the first theater in Queens with these features. During the 1950s, in addition to screening films, the Valencia hosted events such as opera performances, jazz concerts, homemaking contests, and boxing matches. By the 1960s, Loew's Theaters Inc. had begun to struggle financially, and the chain closed some of its larger theaters due to high expenses. The Valencia continued to operate during the decade, but other Loew's theaters had been subdivided, partially closed, or even demolished.

In the early 1960s, the theater's lobby was repainted to promote the 1961 film Barabbas. The Valencia also hosted events such as women-only film screenings, televised boxing matches, and circus acts during the 1960s and 1970s. A Newsday reporter wrote in 1971 that the theater's cloud machine had broken down several years previously without being repaired. The backstage area, once used for stage shows, had long since been converted to storage space. Variety noted in 1973 that the balcony had been shuttered for several years and that the Valencia no longer had a monopoly on first runs of films. Despite its decline, the Valencia was one of the few remaining movie palaces in New York City.

In 1976, amid rumors of the theater's imminent closure, the New York City Landmarks Preservation Commission (LPC) began considering designating the Valencia Theatre as a city landmark. The Greater Jamaica Development Corporation, which supported the designation, suggested converting the Valencia into a cultural center. However, Loew's opposed the landmark designation, which was not granted at that time. Loew's closed the theater permanently on June 15, 1977, citing declining business and a declining supply of suitable movies. The Valencia's last film was the 1977 movie The Greatest.

=== Church use ===
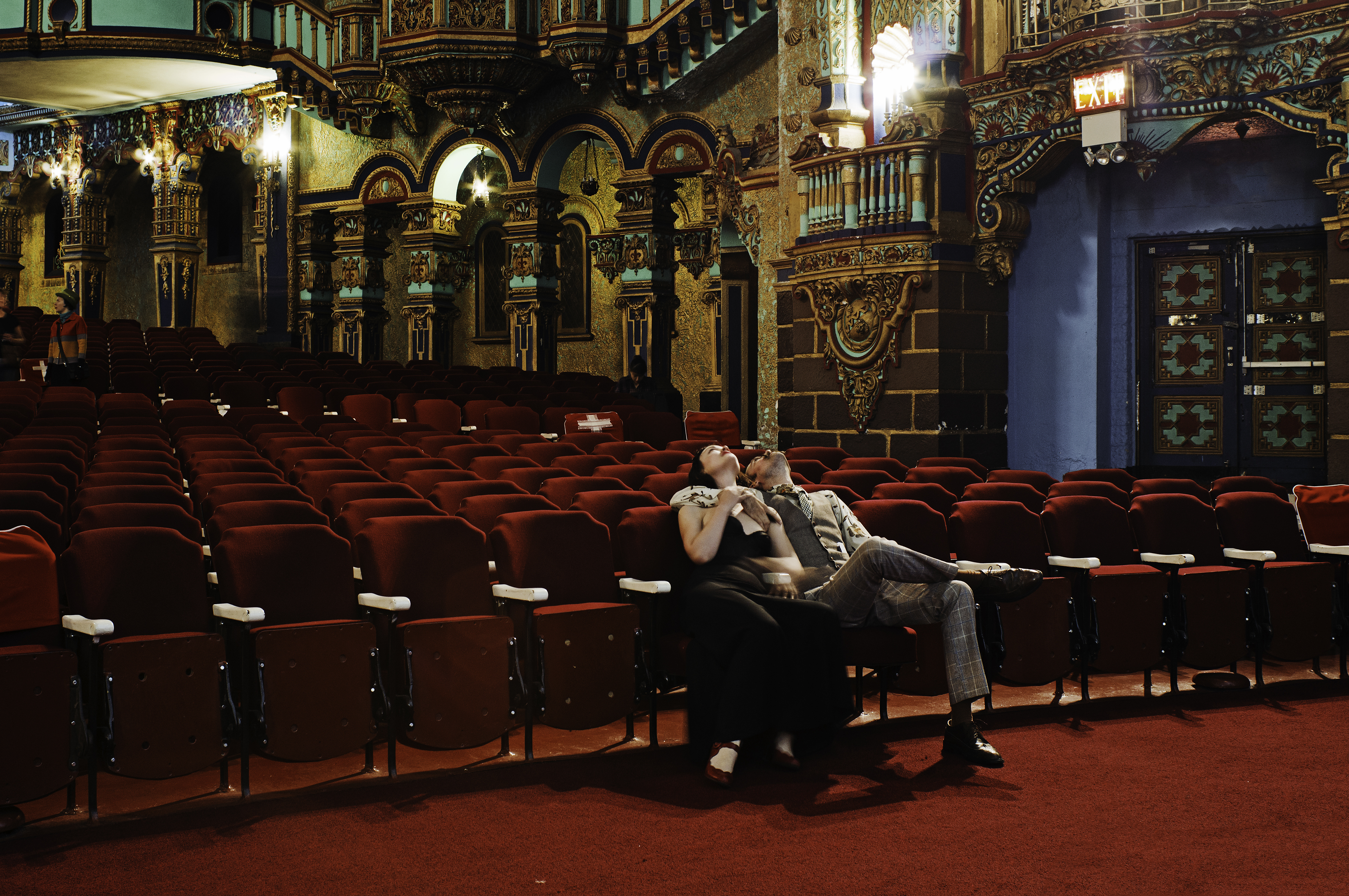
Two people sitting in the theater

In July 1977, Loew's decided to donate the building to the Tabernacle of Prayer, a Brooklyn–based congregation, which paid Loew's a nominal fee of $1. The congregation had decided to acquire the Valencia Theatre after a failed attempt to buy the Kings Theatre. Johnnie Washington, the congregation's pastor, described the theater as "a miracle, a gift from God",and Jennifer Raab (who later served as the LPC's chairwoman) said that Loew's had received "a special message from above" when it donated the Valencia. Washington's administration assistant Cynthia Hedgepeth noted that the auditorium was full of litter and grime. The Tabernacle of Prayer subsequently restored the theater and hired George Exarchou to carry out the work. A chandelier was installed on the auditorium's ceiling, and the auditorium's nude statues were converted into winged angels with robes. The congregation replaced decaying plaster and repainted the interiors, while the projection room became a tower of prayer. In addition, a choir loft and pulpit were constructed, and the original interior decorations were restored. The congregation added a "wall of crutches" to the foyer, signifying those who had been "healed" there. The fish pond was emptied and used as a wedding-picture backdrop.

The renovations ultimately cost about $250,000, and the Tabernacle of Prayer moved into the theater in October 1977. The Valencia was one of several movie theaters in eastern Queens that were converted into churches. The theater could accommodate crowds of at least 2,500 people each Sunday, and it also hosted tours. Initially, only the orchestra level was open to the public; it accommodated 3,000 worshippers simultaneously by the 1980s. The Tabernacle of Prayer contained to maintain the theater, keeping it in good condition. A 1998 article from the New York Daily News stated that the Tabernacle of Prayer had spent $200,000 painting the theater and $100,000 on various other fixes. Though the exterior remained unchanged, the marquee had been covered in a protective wrap due to deterioration. By then, the theater hosted between 1,200 and 1,500 congregants on Sundays and 2,100 for Easter services. A congregational elder estimated that 95% of the structure had been renovated.

In 1998, the Tabernacle of Prayer asked the LPC to again consider designating the theater as a landmark; the congregation also wanted the theater to be listed on the National Register of Historic Places. The LPC designated the Valencia as an exterior landmark on May 25, 1999, making it one of two theaters in Queens with city-landmark status, after the RKO Keith's in Flushing. (Note: However, the Valencia is not the second theater in Queens to be designated as a landmark. The Loew's Triboro was designated in 1973 and then demolished.) The theater's pastor at the time, Ronnie Davis, said the congregation was "very excited about" the landmark designation. The interior was ineligible for landmark preservation because the LPC does not give interior-landmark designations to houses of worship. The Landmarks Preservation Foundation also funded the installation of a plaque on the theater's facade, which was dedicated in 2000.

The Valencia continued to operate as a church in the 21st century, and it sometimes hosted public tours. By the 2010s, the congregation had shrunken to 300 members, who met in the theater's basement. Though the theater's heating, ventilation, and air conditioning required $400,000 in upgrades, the congregation did not rent the theater out for events because of concerns that the contents of such events might conflict with their religious beliefs.

== Impact ==
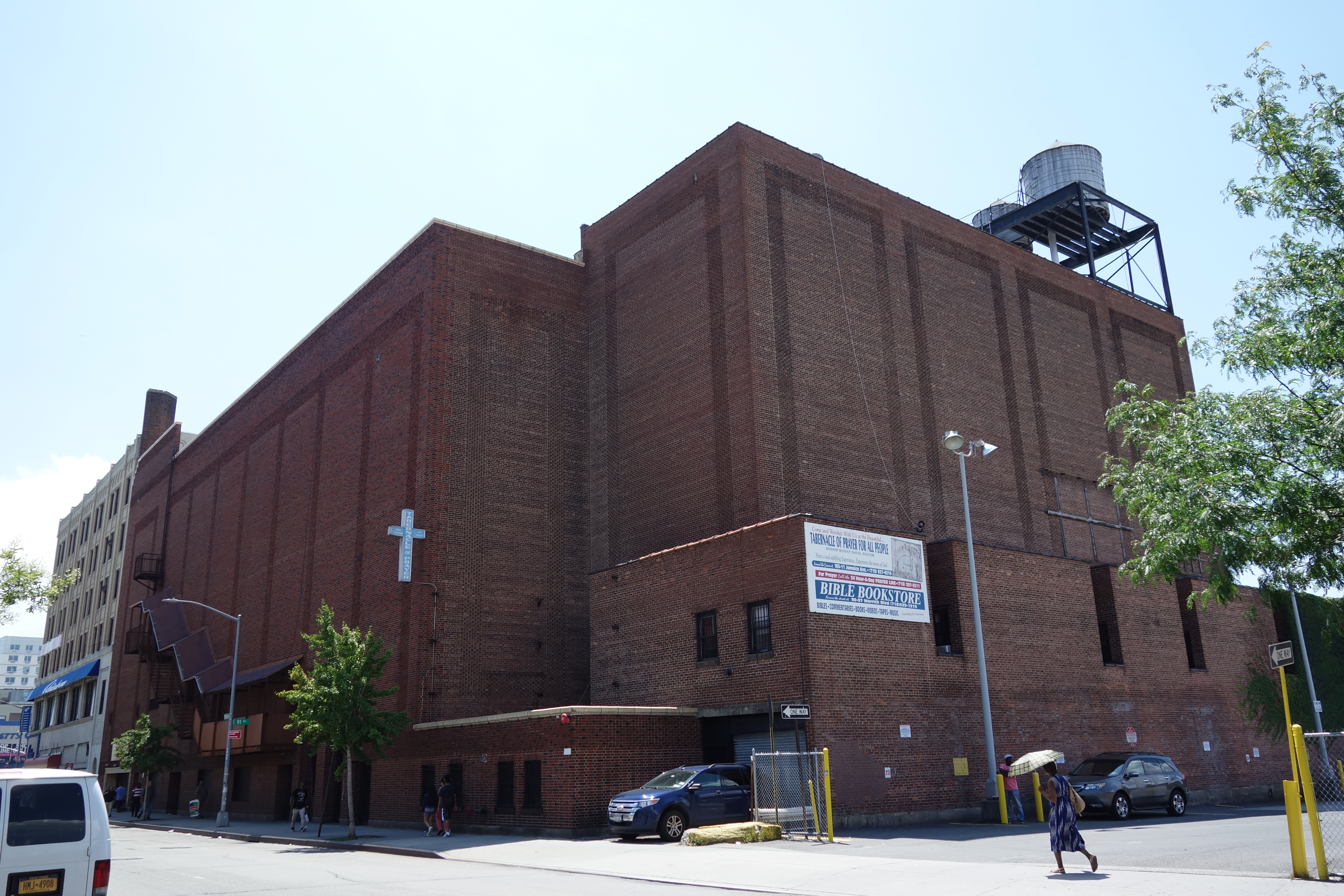
The rear of the theater seen from Merrick Boulevard

When the theater was built, official press releases called it a "Spanish patio garden in gay regalia for a moonlit festival". One newspaper described the main entrance as "very striking" and the main auditorium as being so elaborate as to be "almost beyond description". After the Valencia's completion, the Queens Chamber of Commerce's Queensborough Magazine described the Valencia as one of Queens's "outstanding improvements" during 1928, while Architecture and Building said the Valencia "compares favorably with the largest New York City houses". By the 1970s, Newsday described the theater as "reminiscent of "an earlier, gaudier page of motion pictures", while The New York Times called it "a fading memory of what movie houses were all about in the days when they reflected the splendor that was Hollywood".

When the theater was converted into a church, theatrical critic Elliott Stein criticized its new chandelier as "a 'nouveau riche' chandelier that dangles inappropriately from Eberson's sky", and theatrical historian David Naylor called the chandelier a "startling addition" while noting that the theater largely retained its "magical Venetian-Spanish baroque quality". The Globe and Mail wrote in the 1980s that the theater had a "stage facade repeating the glories of the Alhambra", and Christopher Gray of The New York Times wrote that the auditorium's Spanish decorations "will make even the most jaded architectural pilgrim gasp, or even kneel". Newsday wrote that the theater's architecture "created the impression of a Spanish plaza, complete with a starlit ceiling, niches and exotic decoration". Another writer for the New York Daily News said that the Valencia was "a spectacle in itself". The architect and writer Robert A. M. Stern regarded the Valencia as one of Eberson's "more modest designs", especially as compared with Loew's Paradise and 72nd Street theaters.

The Wantagh Preservation Society of Wantagh, New York, hosted an exhibit about the Valencia Theatre's history in 1979, and the theater was also depicted in a 2004 exhibit at the Museum of the Moving Image. In addition, when Sony built a multiplex movie theater in Lincoln Square, Manhattan, in 1995, one of the multiplex's screens was named for the Valencia Theatre.

== See also ==
- List of New York City Designated Landmarks in Queens
